= Southwest Territory's at-large congressional district =

Former U.S. House delegate's district

- Obsolete district
- Created: 1794, as a non-voting delegate was granted by Congress
- Eliminated: 1796, as a result of statehood as Tennessee
- Years active: 1794–1796

The Southwest Territory, or the Territory South of the River Ohio was organized May 26, 1790. A month later, John Sevier was sworn in to represent it as Congressman from North Carolina's defunct 5th district, which was exactly the same area. It received a non-voting delegate briefly from 1794 to 1796, and was then organized to form the State of Tennessee on June 1, 1796.

== List of delegates representing the district ==
Delegate	Party	Years	Cong ress	Electoral history
James White (Nashville)	No party affiliation	September 3, 1794 – June 1, 1796	3rd 4th	Elected to finish vacant term. Re-elected in 1795. District eliminated upon Tennessee statehood.

== See also ==
- List of United States congressional districts
