= James White (Southwest Territory politician) =

American politician (1749–1809)

Delegate to the U.S. House of Representatives from the Southwest Territory's at-large district
- In office September 3, 1794 – June 1, 1796
- Preceded by: Constituency established
- Succeeded by: Andrew Jackson (Representative from Tennessee)

Personal details
- Born: June 16, 1749 Philadelphia, Pennsylvania Colony
- Died: October 1809 (aged 60) St. James Parish, Louisiana, U.S.
- Party: Independent
- Children: Edward
- Relatives: Edward Douglass White (grandson)
- Education: College of St Omer; University of Pennsylvania, University of Edinburgh

James White (June 16, 1749 – October, 1809) was an American physician, lawyer, and politician. He was an early settler at Nashville, Tennessee and in Louisiana. He was a delegate to the Third, Fourth, and Fifth North Carolina Provincial Congresses from Currituck County. He was also a delegate from North Carolina to the Congress of the Confederation, and a delegate to the U.S. House of Representatives from the Southwest Territory. White represented Chatham County in one session of the North Carolina General Assembly, and Currituck County in four sessions. In historical writings, he is usually referred to as "Dr. James White" to distinguish him from other contemporary James Whites.

White was born into a prosperous mercantile family in Philadelphia, Pennsylvania, the son of Anne (Willcox) and James White. His early education was at the College of St. Omer, a Jesuit school in modern-day France (then part of the Austrian Netherlands). His medical education was finished at the University of Edinburgh. After graduating he practiced medicine outside Philadelphia, and served as a physician in the Revolution before moving to the Province of North Carolina.

In 1785, White was elected to the North Carolina House of Commons. In 1786, North Carolina sent him as a delegate to the Continental Congress where he served until 1788. Late in 1786, Congress named him Superintendent of Indian Affairs for the southern department. After that he was frequently absent from Congress, traveling the Carolina and Georgia frontiers negotiating with the Indian tribes. After his congressional service he moved to the frontier, buying land and settling in what became Nashville, Tennessee.

When the Southwest Territory's legislature was formed in 1794, White was selected as its delegate to the United States House of Representatives, serving from 1794 to 1796. After Tennessee gained statehood in 1796, he returned home to Davidson County, but the death of his wife prompted him to sell his property and move to Natchez.

James White was fluent in French and Spanish. In the 1780s he had become involved with John Sevier's plan to place the State of Franklin under Spanish rule. He used his position and travels as Indian superintendent to serve as agent conducting negotiations between Sevier and the governor of Spanish Louisiana. In the 1790s he was involved in William Blount's plan to work with the Indians and Britain in staging an invasion of Spanish Florida. As his role in these schemes became known, he moved to the Spanish territory of New Orleans in 1799, settling in Attakapas.

While his earlier actions caused problems in Tennessee, they were not widely known. When the United States expansion reached him again, President Jefferson named him as a territorial judge in 1804, initially for the District of Louisiana, and then for the Territory of Orleans. His family prospered in Louisiana. His son, (Edward Douglass White Sr.), was Governor of Louisiana. His grandson, Edward Douglass White, served as Chief Justice of the United States.

James White died at home in 1809 in St. James Parish, Louisiana.

U.S. House of Representatives
New constituency	Delegate to the U.S. House of Representatives from the Southwest Territory's at-large congressional district 1794–1796	Succeeded by Andrew Jackson as U.S. Representative from Tennessee
