= William Blount =

American politician, landowner and Founding Father (1749–1800)

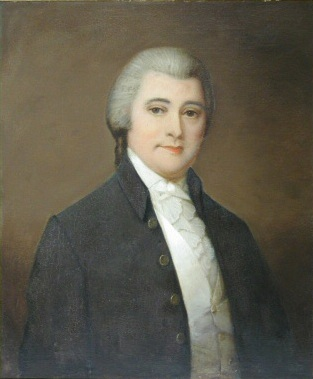
- Portrait by Washington Bogart Cooper, 1850

Speaker of the Tennessee Senate
- In office 1798–1799
- Preceded by: James White
- Succeeded by: Alexander Outlaw

United States Senator from Tennessee
- In office August 2, 1796 – July 8, 1797
- Preceded by: Himself (Shadow Senator from the Southwest Territory)
- Succeeded by: Joseph Anderson

United States Shadow Senator from the Southwest Territory
- In office March 30, 1796 – August 2, 1796
- Preceded by: Seat established
- Succeeded by: Himself (U.S. Senator from Tennessee)

Governor of the Southwest Territory
- In office September 20, 1790 – March 30, 1796
- Preceded by: Position established
- Succeeded by: John Sevier (Tennessee)

Member of the Congress of the Confederation from North Carolina
- In office 1786–1787
- In office 1782–1783

Personal details
- Born: April 6, 1749 (March 29, 1749 (O.S.)) Windsor, Province of North Carolina, British America
- Died: March 21, 1800 (aged 50) Knoxville, Tennessee, U.S.
- Resting place: First Presbyterian Church Cemetery
- Party: Democratic-Republican
- Spouse: Mary Grainger
- Children: 6, including William Grainger
- Relatives: Thomas Blount (brother); Willie Blount (half-brother); Pleasant Miller (son-in-law); Edmund P. Gaines (son-in-law)

William Blount (/blʌnt/ BLUNT; April 6, 1749 – March 21, 1800) was an American politician, landowner and Founding Father who was one of the signers of the Constitution of the United States. He was a member of the North Carolina delegation at the Constitutional Convention of 1787 and led the efforts for North Carolina to ratify the Constitution in 1789 at the Fayetteville Convention. He then served as the only governor of the Southwest Territory and played a leading role in helping the territory gain admission to the union as the state of Tennessee. He was selected as one of Tennessee's initial United States Senators in 1796, serving until he was expelled for treason in 1797.

Born to a prominent North Carolina family, Blount served as a paymaster during the American Revolutionary War. He was elected to the North Carolina legislature in 1781, where he remained in one role or another for most of the decade, except for two terms in the Continental Congress in 1782 and 1786. Blount pushed efforts in the legislature to open the lands west of the Appalachians to settlement. As governor of the Southwest Territory, he negotiated the Treaty of Holston in 1791, bringing thousands of acres of Indian lands under U.S. control.

An aggressive land speculator, Blount gradually acquired millions of acres in Tennessee and the Trans-Appalachian West. His risky land investments left him in debt, and in the 1790s, he conspired of his own accord to have Great Britain take over Spanish-controlled Louisiana and Florida in the hope of boosting local land prices. When the conspiracy was uncovered in 1797, he was expelled from the Senate and became the first federal official to face impeachment. However, Blount remained popular in Tennessee and served in the state senate during the last years of his life.

== Early life ==
Blount was born on Easter Sunday at Rosefield, the home of his maternal grandfather, John Gray, in Windsor, Province of North Carolina. He was the eldest child of Jacob Blount (1726–1789) and Barbara Gray Blount. The Blounts had gradually risen to prominence in the first half of the 18th century as William's grandfather and father had steadily built the family fortune. In the years following William's birth, Jacob Blount built a plantation, Blount Hall, in Pitt County, North Carolina.

Coat of Arms of William Blount

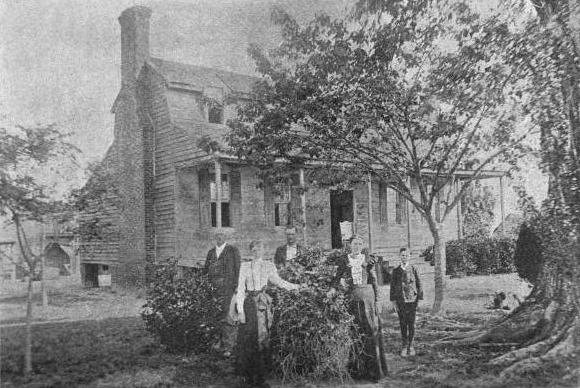
Blount Hall, childhood home of William Blount

Outside of tutors, William and his brothers had little formal education but were involved in their father's business ventures at a young age. Jacob Blount raised livestock, cotton, and tobacco, produced turpentine, and operated a mill and horse racing track for the local community. His land acquisitions, consisting of several thousand acres by the end of the 1760s, taught his sons the profit potential of aggressive land speculation.

During the Regulator Movement of the late 1760s and early 1770s, the Blounts remained loyal to the North Carolina government. Jacob Blount, a justice of the peace, furnished Governor William Tryon's army with supplies as it marched to defeat the Regulators at the Battle of Alamance in 1771. William Blount, along with his brothers Jacob and John Gray Blount, were among Tryon's soldiers, though they saw little action.

== American Revolution ==
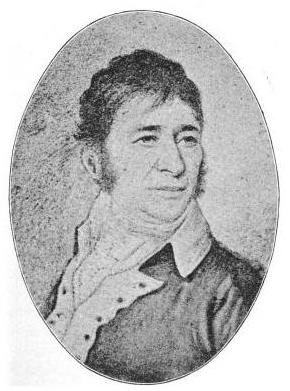
Reading Blount

As tensions heightened between Great Britain and the Thirteen Colonies in the 1770s, the Blount family gradually aligned themselves with the Patriot cause. In April 1776, Jacob Blount was appointed paymaster of the 2nd North Carolina Regiment, and William Blount was appointed paymaster for the New Bern District Brigade of the North Carolina militia the following month. William's brothers, Reading and Thomas Blount, accepted commissions in the Continental Army. The Blounts provided provisions for the Continental Army and militias, and they profited both financially and politically from the war. They also began looking westward, with John Gray Blount acquiring a portion of Richard Henderson's Transylvania Purchase in mid-1776.

In December 1776, William Blount was appointed paymaster of the 3rd North Carolina Regiment and spent the first few months of 1777 with the unit as it marched north to join George Washington's forces in the defense of Philadelphia. In November 1777, political rivals in the North Carolina legislature removed Blount as paymaster, though he was restored to the office in April 1778. He helped organize regiments for the defense of Charleston, South Carolina, which fell to the British in 1780 during the siege of Charleston. William's brother, Thomas, was captured during the siege.

In early 1780, Blount was appointed official commissary to General Horatio Gates, who had arrived in North Carolina to command Patriot forces in the South. Blount was present at Gates's defeat at the Battle of Camden in August 1780 and in the confusion of battle lost $300,000 intended to be used to pay Patriot soldiers.

== North Carolina politics and the Continental Congress ==
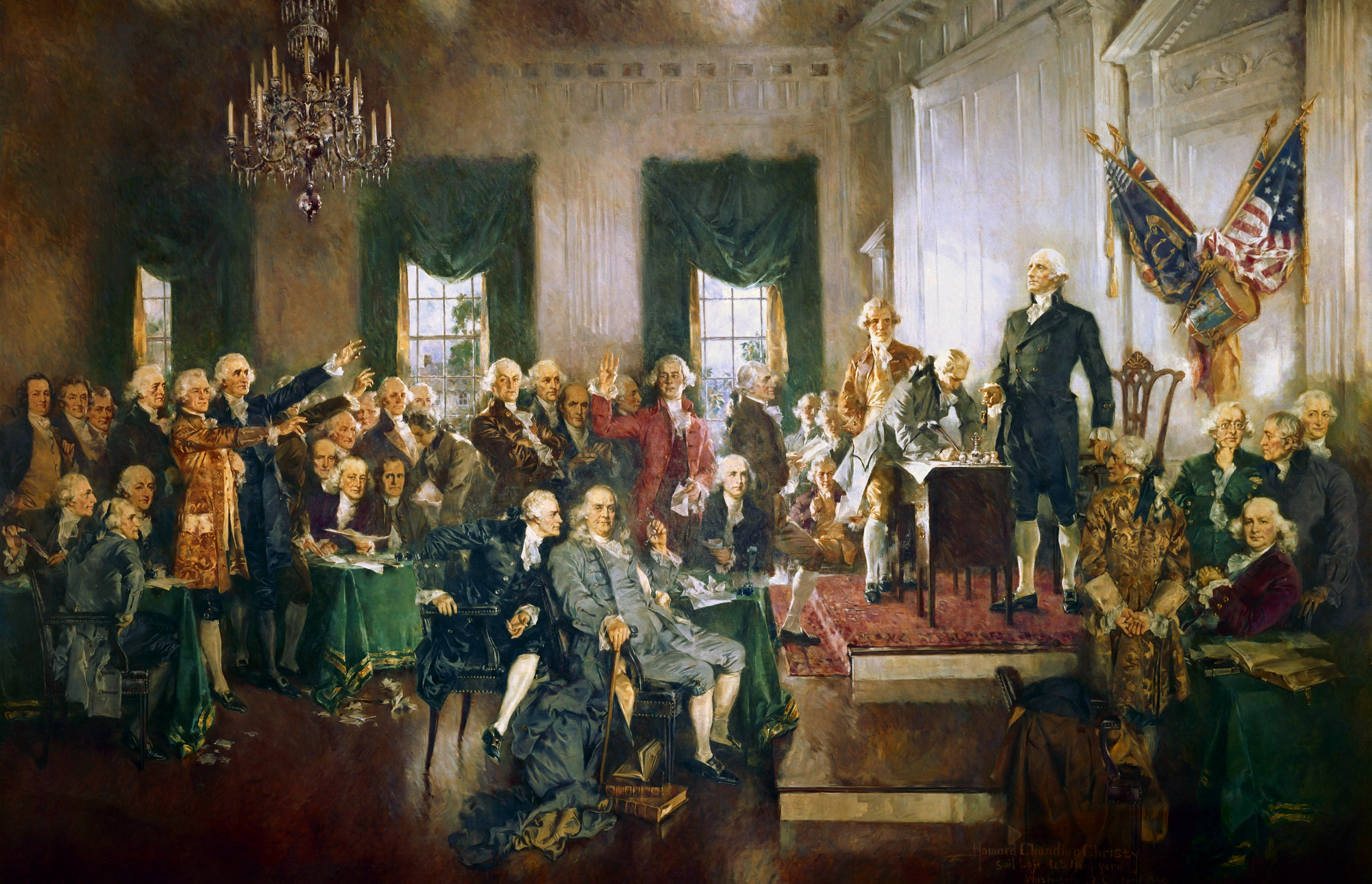
Scene at the Signing of the Constitution of the United States, a 1940 painting by Howard Chandler Christy

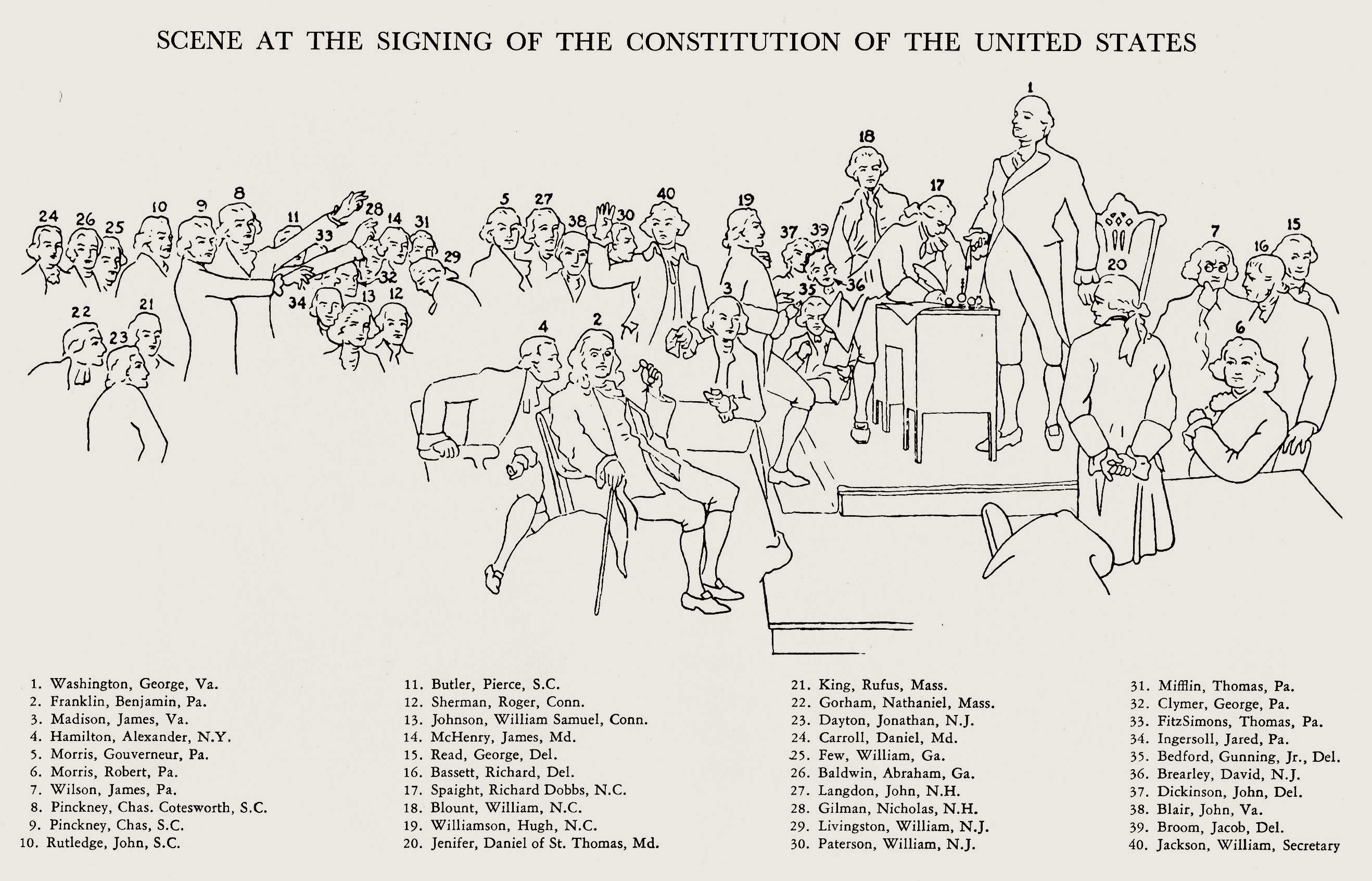
Key, William Blount, No 18

In late 1779, Blount ran for the vacant New Bern state House of Commons seat against Richard Dobbs Spaight in a campaign described by Blount's biographer, William Masterson, as "violent in an age of fierce elections." Spaight won by a narrow margin, but Blount successfully convinced election officials that voter fraud had occurred, and the election was voided. In the weeks following the Battle of Camden, Blount again ran for the seat and this time was successful. He took his seat in the House of Commons in January 1781.

In May 1782, Blount was elected one of North Carolina's four delegates to the Continental Congress. At the Congress's 1782 session, Blount helped defeat a poll tax and a liquor tax and opposed a reduction of the army. He also agreed to consider a land cession act to satisfy North Carolina's massive tax debt owed to the Confederation. Blount left Philadelphia in January 1783 and resigned from Congress three months later to accept an appointment to the North Carolina House of Commons steering committee.

During the House's 1783 and 1784 sessions, Blount introduced several bills that would prove critical in the early history of what is now Tennessee. One bill, known as the "Land Grab Act," opened the state's lands west of the Appalachians (i.e., the parts of Tennessee not under Indian domain) to settlement. One individual who took advantage of this act was militia captain James White, who acquired a tract of land that would later become Knoxville, Tennessee. Another bill rendered soldiers with at least two years of military service eligible for land grants. Some soldiers used their grants to acquire land in the Tennessee Valley, while others sold their grants to the Blounts and other land speculators. In 1784, Blount sponsored a bill establishing the city of Nashville in what was then the Cumberland settlements.

In June 1784, Blount sponsored another bill critical to early Tennessee history—a bill calling for North Carolina lands west of the Appalachians (i.e., modern Tennessee) to be ceded to the Continental Congress to satisfy the state's share of the nation's tax burden. The bill was hotly contested but passed by a 52-43 margin. Opponents of the cession gained control of the House and repealed the act in October, but not before a movement by the Tennessee Valley residents to establish a separate state, known as the State of Franklin, had gained momentum. A friend of both North Carolina Governor Richard Caswell and Franklinite leader John Sevier, Blount waffled on the Franklin issue for the next four years.

Despite the cession debacle, Blount was elected to the Continental Congress for the 1785 session. As he prepared to depart, however, word came that the Congress had appointed a commission to negotiate a new treaty, eventually known as the Treaty of Hopewell, with the southern tribes. Fearing the new treaty would be unfavorable to North Carolina, Blount, with Governor Caswell's blessing, headed south in hopes of negotiating a separate treaty for the state. He arrived too late, however, and the Hopewell Treaty negotiated by the commissioners returned a sizeable portion of western lands claimed by North Carolina speculators to the Indians. Fearing a backlash back home, Blount merely signed the treaty as a witness.

In March 1786, Blount hurried to New York to take his seat in the Continental Congress, hoping to prevent ratification of the Hopewell Treaty, but once again he arrived too late, and the treaty was ratified. Disappointed, he went home, but with anger rising over his handling of the Hopewell Treaty, he returned to the Continental Congress in November 1786. In March 1787, Blount was chosen as one of five delegates to represent North Carolina at the Constitutional Convention in Philadelphia. Blount arrived at the convention on June 20, after debates had already begun. He sent a copy of the Virginia Plan (in violation of Convention rules), and, expressing pessimism in the Convention's outcome, he stayed for just a few days before heading to New York to rejoin the Continental Congress in early July. He was present for the Congress's debate and passage of the Northwest Ordinance and heard Henry Knox's report recommending a North Carolina land cession. By August 7, however, he had returned to the Convention in Philadelphia for final debates. Still reeling from the fallout from the Hopewell Treaty, he was wary of signing the final document but was finally convinced by Gouverneur Morris to do so.

Confident that North Carolina would gain more than it would lose with the new Constitution, Blount returned home to campaign for its ratification. Elected to the North Carolina Senate from Pitt County in 1788 and 1789, Blount and his allies successfully countered attempts by anti-federalists Willie Jones and William Lenoir to thwart adoption of the new Constitution, and North Carolina voted for its ratification in November 1789. On December 1, the state legislature voted to cede its trans-Appalachian lands to the new federal government. Blount sought one of North Carolina's inaugural U.S. Senate seats in November 1789 but was defeated by Benjamin Hawkins.

== Southwest Territory ==
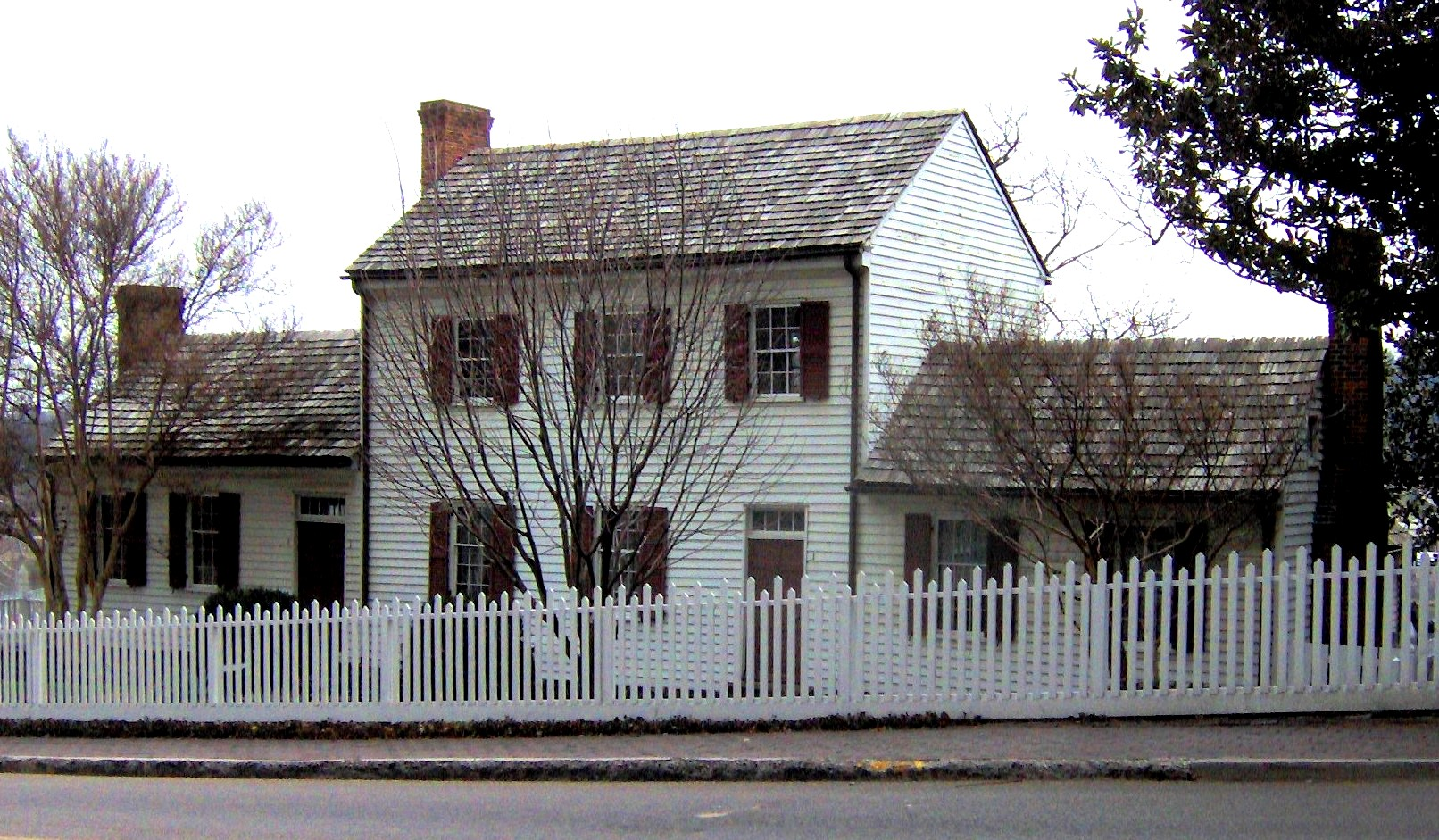
Blount Mansion, home of William Blount in Knoxville, built in the early 1790s

Congress accepted North Carolina's western cession, which consisted of what is now Tennessee, on April 2, 1790. In May, the Southwest Territory was created from the new cession and was to be governed under the Northwest Ordinance. On June 8, President George Washington appointed Blount governor of the new territory. Blount visited Washington at Mount Vernon on September 18 and was sworn in by Supreme Court Justice James Iredell two days later. In October 1790, he set up a temporary capital at William Cobb's house, Rocky Mount, in what is now Piney Flats, Tennessee, and began organizing a government for the new territory.

The western frontiersmen were initially skeptical of Blount, who came across as an aristocratic Easterner. Blount managed to gain their trust, however, by recommending John Sevier and James Robertson as brigadier generals of the territorial militia, and appointing Landon Carter, Stockley Donelson and Gilbert Christian as colonels. Former Franklinites appointed to lower government offices included Joseph Hardin, William Cage, James White, Dr. James White and Francis Alexander Ramsey. Others receiving appointments included future president Andrew Jackson, future governor Archibald Roane and naval officer George Farragut. Blount hired his half-brother, Willie Blount, as a personal secretary and recruited Fayetteville, North Carolina, publisher George Roulstone to establish a newspaper for the new territory, known as the Gazette.

In December 1790, following his trip to the Cumberland territories, Blount's family joined him at Rocky Mount. The following year, he chose James White's Fort, near the confluence of the Holston and French Broad rivers, as the territory's new capital. He named the capital "Knoxville" after his superior, the United States Secretary of War Henry Knox. Following the initial sale of lots in October 1791, he began construction of his mansion in the city.

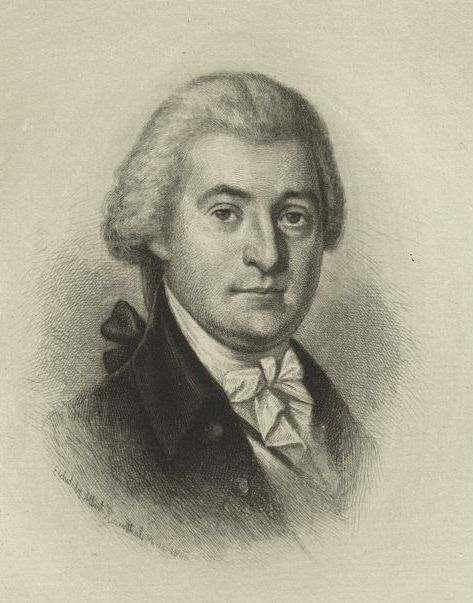
Portrait of Blount by Albert Rosenthal

Throughout his term as governor, Blount was torn between angry western frontiersmen, who demanded war against hostile Indians, and a War Department that consistently pushed for peaceful negotiations with the Indians. In June 1791, he negotiated the Treaty of Holston with Cherokee leader John Watts and several other chiefs, resolving land claims south of the French Broad and obtaining permission for a permanent road between the territory's eastern settlements and the Cumberland settlements. In spite of this treaty, Chickamauga attacks increased the following year. Frustrated settlers demanded federal troops intervene, but the War Department refused, blaming settlers for intruding on Indian lands.

William Cocke, an ex-Franklinite, blamed Blount for the lack of action against the Chickamaugas and began publishing attacks against Blount in the Gazette. Blount responded with a series of articles (published under pseudonyms) rejecting Cocke and calling for patience. Following attacks by the Chickamaugas against Ziegler's Station in 1792 and against Cavet's Station in 1793, however, Blount was unable to contain the rage of frontiersmen and called up the militia. Sevier led the militia south into Georgia and attacked and destroyed several Chickamauga villages. Knox blasted Blount for the invasion and refused to issue pay for the militiamen. Blount finally negotiated a truce with the Chickamauga at the Tellico Blockhouse in 1794.

Toward the middle of his term, Blount began implementing the steps stipulated in the Northwest Ordinance for a territory to gain statehood. One of these steps was to call for the election of a legislature and submit nominees for appointments to a territorial council, which Blount did in 1794. On September 15, 1795, he directed county sheriffs to conduct a census. The census placed the territory's population at 77,000, substantially more than the 60,000 required for statehood. Blount ordered a state constitutional convention to be held at Knoxville in January 1796, which he personally attended as part of the Knox County delegation. The government of the new state convened in late March 1796, before it had been officially admitted to the Union.

Blount realized he had little chance of defeating Sevier in a race for governor of the new state, so he instead sought one of the state's two United States Senate seats. He received this appointment (along with William Cocke) on March 30, 1796, and headed to Philadelphia to campaign for Tennessee's statehood. Blount's brother, Thomas (a Congressman from North Carolina), along with James Madison, convinced the house to vote for Tennessee's admission to the Union on May 6. The Senate voted to admit the new state on May 31.

== Blount Conspiracy ==
Throughout the 1780s and 1790s, William Blount and his brothers gradually bought up large amounts of western lands, acquiring over 2.5 million acres by the mid-1790s. Much of this land was bought on credit, pushing the family deeply into debt. In 1795, the market for western lands collapsed, and land prices plummeted. A number of land speculators, including Blount associate David Allison, went bankrupt. Blount partnered with Philadelphia physician Nicholas Romayne in an attempt to sell land to British investors, but their efforts were unsuccessful. Compounding Blount's problems, Timothy Pickering, who despised Blount, replaced Henry Knox as secretary of war in 1795. Blount owned slaves as well.

Following France's defeat of Spain in the War of the Pyrenees, land speculators, already on the financial brink, worried that the French would eventually gain control of Spanish-controlled Louisiana and shut off American access to the Mississippi River. In hopes of preventing this, Blount and his friend, Indian agent John Chisholm, concocted a plan to allow the British to gain control of Spanish-controlled Louisiana and Florida, expecting them in turn to give free access to both New Orleans and the Mississippi River to American merchants. The plan called for American territorial militias, with the aid of the British Royal Navy, to attack New Madrid, New Orleans, and Pensacola.

To help carry out the plan, Blount recruited Romayne, who never showed more than lukewarm support for the idea, and Knoxville merchant James Carey. Chisholm, meanwhile, sailed to England to recruit British supporters for the plan. In April 1797, Carey was at the Tellico Blockhouse near Knoxville when he gave a government agent a letter from Blount outlining the conspiracy. The agent turned the letter over to his superior, Colonel David Henley in Knoxville, and Henley in turn sent it to Pickering. Elated at the opportunity to crush Blount, Pickering turned the letter over to President John Adams.

Determining that the actions of Blount, a senator from Tennessee, constituted a crime, Adams sent Blount's letter to the Senate, where it was presented on July 3, 1797, while Blount was out for a walk. When Blount returned, the clerk read the contents of the letter aloud as Blount stood in stunned silence. Vice President Thomas Jefferson asked Blount if he had written the letter. Blount gave an evasive answer and asked that the matter be postponed until the following day, which was granted. On July 4, Blount refused to return to the Senate and had Cocke read a letter which again requested more time. The Senate rejected this request and formed an investigative committee. Ordered to testify before the committee, Blount initially attempted to flee by ship to North Carolina, but federal deputies seized the ship and most of his belongings. On July 7, Blount, after consulting with attorneys Alexander Dallas and Jared Ingersoll, testified before the committee and denied writing the letter. The following day, the House of Representatives voted 41 to 30 to hold impeachment hearings, and the Senate voted 25 to 1 to "sequester" Blount's seat, effectively expelling him, with Henry Tazewell casting the lone dissenting vote.

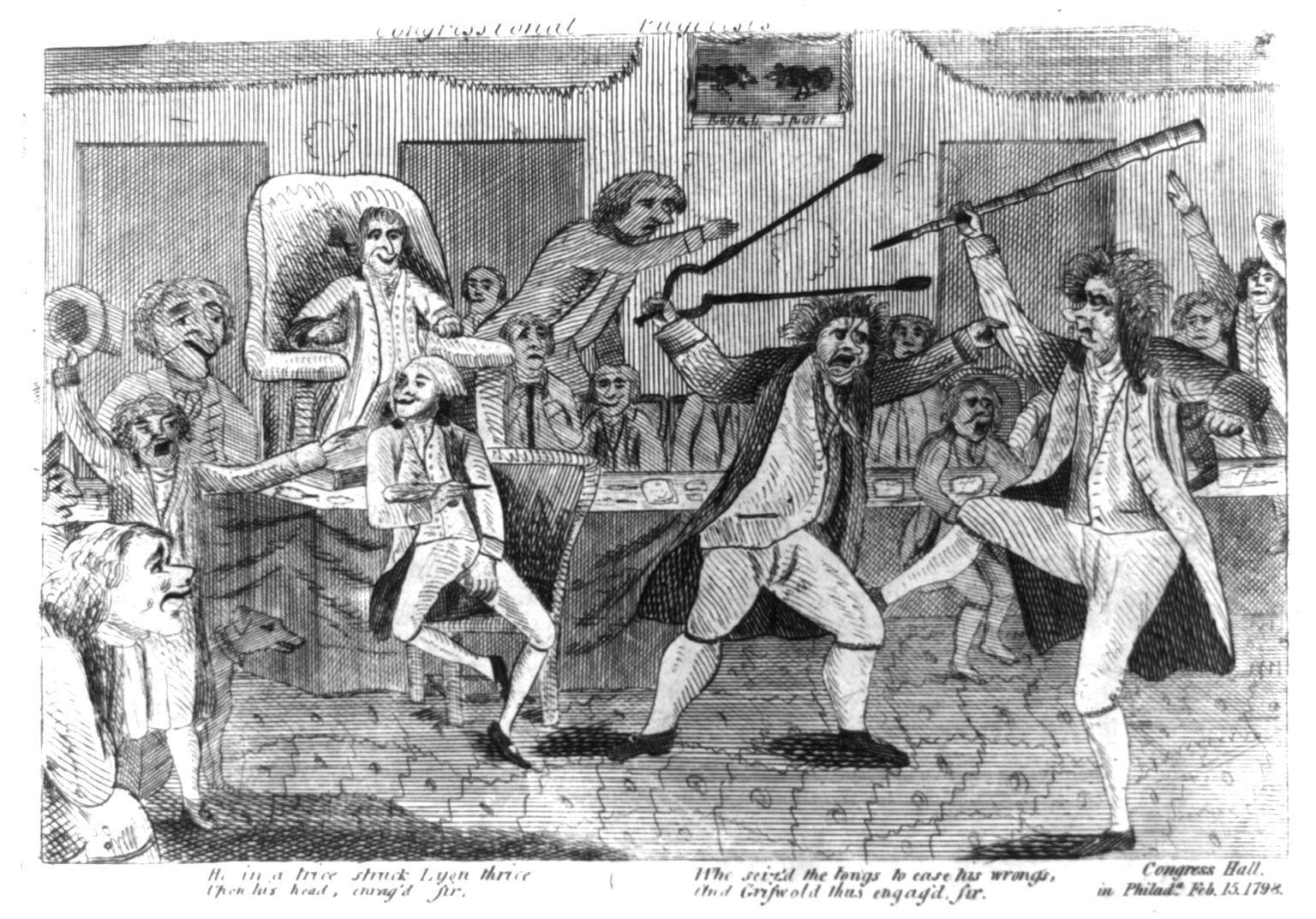
Drawing depicting a brawl between congressmen Matthew Lyon and Roger Griswold, which took place in February 1798, following an incident that happened a few weeks prior in preparation for Blount's impeachment hearings.

Rather than await trial, Blount posted bail and fled to Tennessee. Chisholm remained in England in a debtors' prison for several months and confessed the entire scheme upon his return. Romayne was arrested and forced to testify before the committee, where he confessed to his part in the conspiracy. The House continued to consider evidence for Blount's impeachment in early 1798. At one session on January 30, a bizarre incident erupted between two congressmen, Matthew Lyon and Roger Griswold, in connection with the hearings. A few weeks later, a brawl between the two Representatives occurred. The Senate convened as a Court of Impeachment for the impeachment trial on December 17, 1798; though Blount refused to attend, in spite of a visit to Knoxville from the Senate sergeant-at-arms, the Senate heard arguments from his counsel, who argued lack of jurisdiction because Blount had not been an officer within the meaning of Article II, nor was he now an officer since he had been expelled and now held no federal office. On January 11, 1799, the Senate voted 14 to 11 to dismiss the impeachment for lack of jurisdiction. The ruling left unclear which (or both) of the two arguments were dispositive, though it became generally accepted that impeachment did not extend to senators.

The unraveling of the conspiracy destroyed Blount's reputation at the national level and touched off a series of accusations between Federalists and Anti-federalists. George Washington called for swift justice against Blount and hoped he would be "held in detestation by all good men." Abigail Adams called the conspiracy a "diabolical plot" and bemoaned the fact that there was no guillotine in Philadelphia. Pickering argued the conspiracy was part of a greater French plot and accused Thomas Jefferson of being involved. Oliver Wolcott suggested the conspiracy was an attempt to blackmail Spain.

== Later life ==
While Blount's national reputation was ruined, he remained popular in Tennessee. Upon his return to Knoxville in September 1797, he was paraded triumphantly through the city by a military procession led by James White and James Stuart. Most of his old Tennessee allies, among them Andrew Jackson, Joseph Anderson, James White, Charles McClung and William C. C. Claiborne, remained loyal, and helped repair his image among locals. Blount, likewise, adopted a staunchly pro-Western attitude.

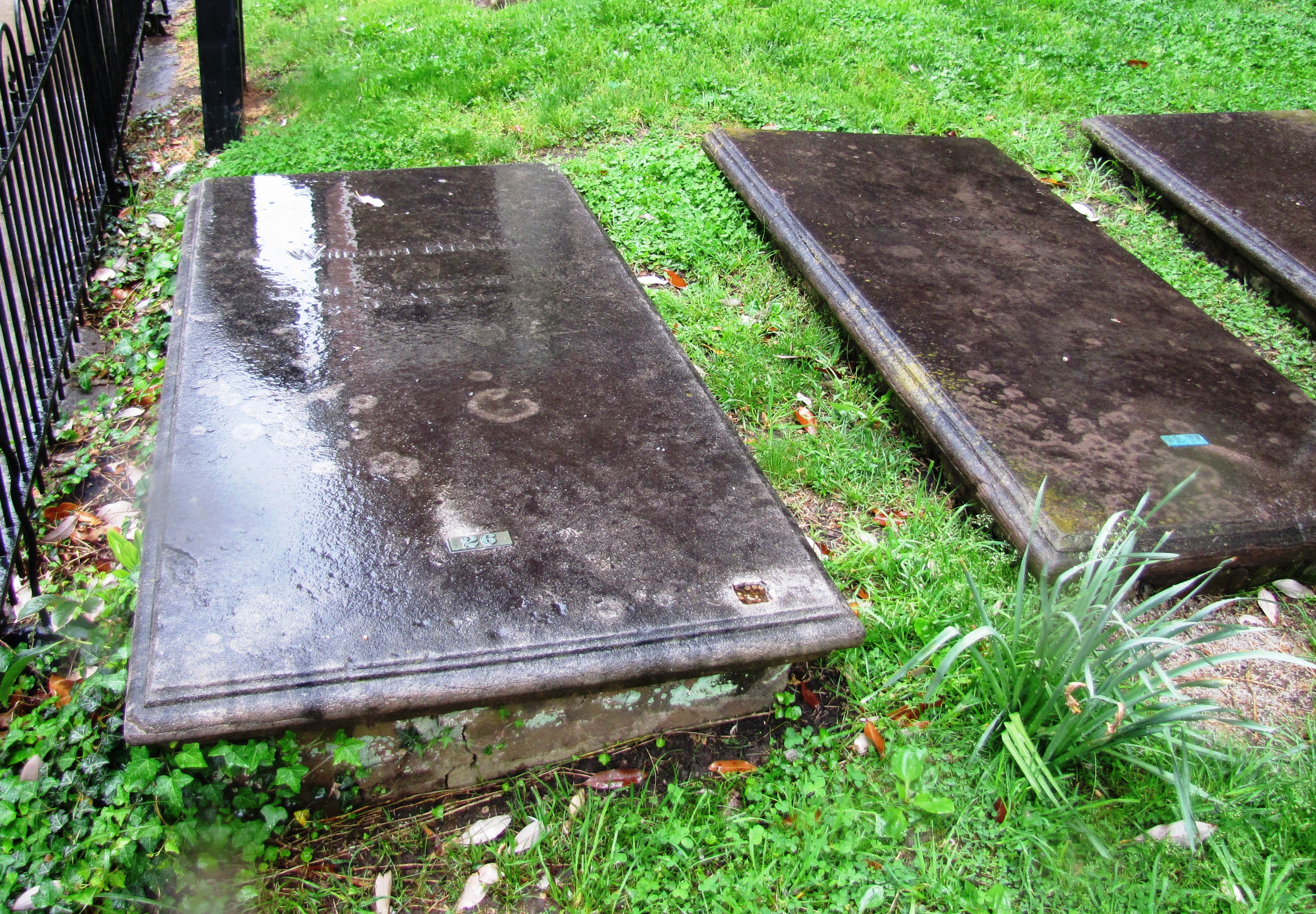
Graves of Blount and his wife, Mary, at the First Presbyterian Church Cemetery in Knoxville

In 1798, Congress appointed commissioners to survey the boundary between U.S. and Cherokee lands set by the Treaty of Holston. Concerned the commissioners would run the boundary in a way that favored the Cherokee over the settlers, Blount and Sevier sent agents to harass the commissioners. To further push Western interests, they sent representatives to federal treaty negotiations at the Tellico Blockhouse in 1798, frustrating federal negotiators sent by Congress and confusing Cherokee representatives.

In his report on the Tellico treaty, one of the commissioners, Elisha Hall, accused Blount of trying to thwart the treaty, and Blount sued him for libel. After the suit was thrown out by Judge David Campbell, Blount sought Campbell's impeachment, calling him a "meddling blockhead". In October 1798, William Blount was elected to Knox County's state senate seat, following James White's resignation. On December 3, he was named Speaker of the Senate. He spent his first few days in office pushing for Judge Campbell's impeachment. The House voted to impeach Campbell on December 17, but he was acquitted by the Senate on December 26.

In March 1800, an epidemic swept through Knoxville, and several members of the Blount family fell ill. Blount was tending to his sick family when he, too, fell ill on March 11. After 10 days, he died on the night of March 21, 1800. He was buried at the First Presbyterian Church Cemetery a few blocks from his home in Knoxville. His half-brother, Willie, consolidated the family estate and took charge of the education of Blount's children.

== Legacy ==
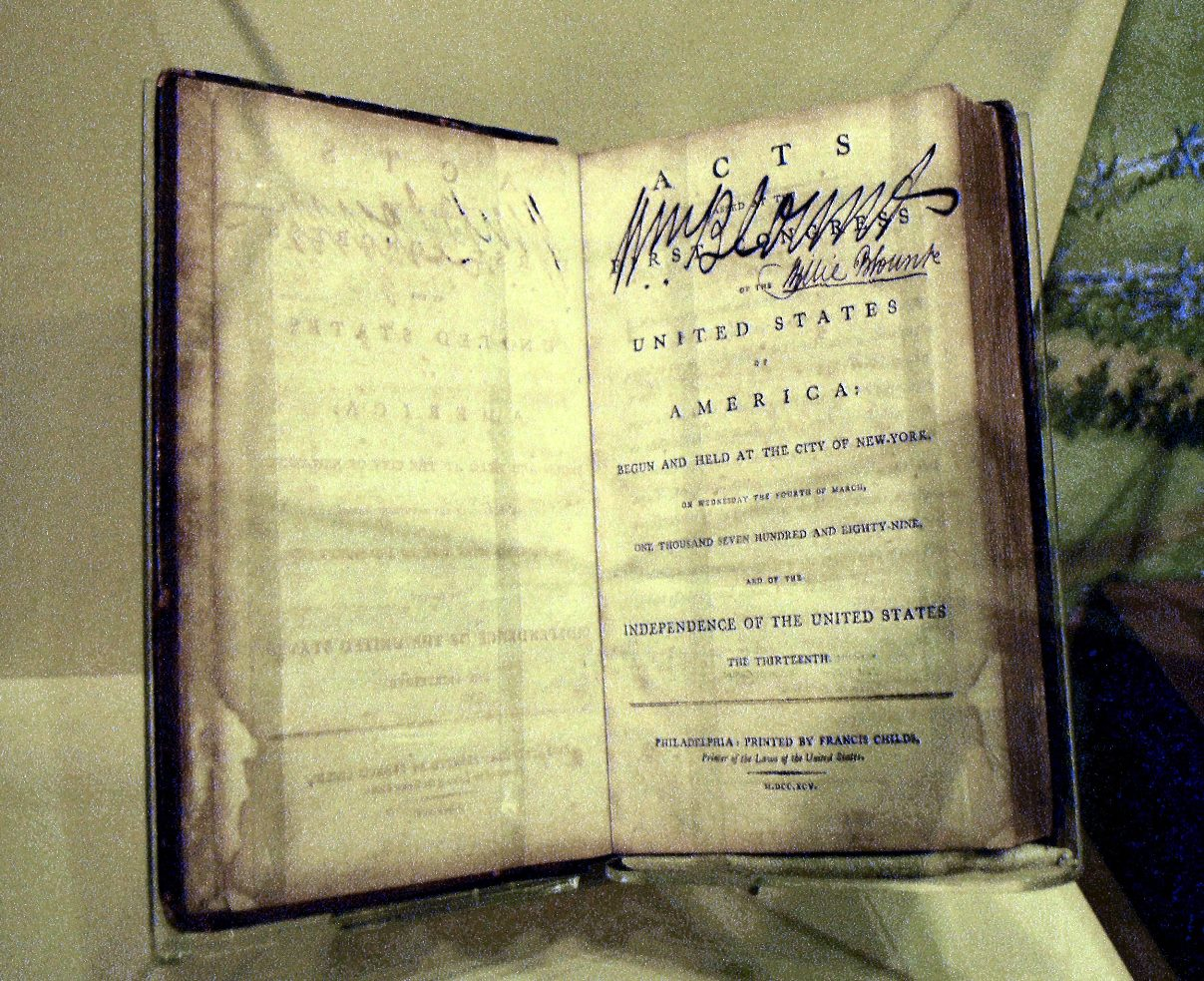
Copy of Acts of the First Congress signed by Blount on display at the East Tennessee History Center in Knoxville

Blount County, Tennessee, is named after Blount, as is the town of Blountville in Sullivan County. Grainger County and Maryville are both named after his wife, Mary Grainger Blount. William Blount High School and Mary Blount Elementary School, both in Blount County, are named after Blount and his wife, respectively. Blount County, Alabama, is named after William's younger half-brother Willie Blount. Blount Street in Raleigh, North Carolina, and Blount Street in Madison, Wisconsin, are both named in Blount's honor. Other entities named for Blount include Fort Blount, which operated in Jackson County, Tennessee, in the 1790s, and Blount College, the forerunner of the University of Tennessee, which was founded in Knoxville in 1794.

Blount's home, Blount Mansion, still stands in Knoxville and is currently a museum operated by the non-profit Blount Mansion Association. The house has been designated a National Historic Landmark and is listed on the National Register of Historic Places. Blount's childhood home in Pitt County, North Carolina, Blount Hall, burned down in the 1960s, though a historical marker stands near the site. A life-size bronze statue of Blount is part of the "Signers' Hall" exhibit at the National Constitution Center in Philadelphia. A plaque in the first floor rotunda of the North Carolina State Capitol honors Blount and the two other North Carolina signers of the Constitution, Richard Dobbs Spaight and Hugh Williamson.

== Family ==
Blount's father, Jacob (1726–1789), married Barbara Gray, the daughter of Scottish businessman John Gray, and they had eight children; William, Anne, John Gray, Louisa, Reading, Thomas, Jacob, and Barbara. After Barbara Gray's death, Jacob married Hannah Salter, and they had five children, though only two lived to maturity, Willie and Sharpe. Thomas Blount represented North Carolina in the U.S. House of Representatives in the 1790s and 1800s. Willie Blount was governor of Tennessee from 1809 to 1815.

William Blount married Mary Grainger in 1778, and they had six children; Ann, Mary Louisa, William Grainger, Richard Blackledge, Barbara and Eliza. William Grainger Blount represented Tennessee in the U.S. House of Representatives from 1815 to 1819. Mary Louisa Blount was married to Congressman Pleasant Miller, and Barbara Blount was married to General Edmund P. Gaines.

== See also ==
- List of United States senators expelled or censured

Political offices
New office	Governor of the Southwest Territory; 1790–1796	Succeeded by John Sevier as Governor of Tennessee
Preceded by James White	Speaker of the Tennessee Senate; 1798–1799	Succeeded by Alexander Outlaw
U.S. Senate
New seat	U.S. Shadow Senator (Class 2) from the Southwest Territory; 1796; Served alongside: William Cocke	Succeeded by Himself as U.S. Senator from Tennessee
Preceded by Himself as Shadow Senator from the Southwest Territory	U.S. Senator (Class 2) from Tennessee; 1796–1797; Served alongside: William Cocke	Succeeded by Joseph Anderson
