= Sevier (surname) =

Sevier is a surname. Notable people with the surname include:

- Ambrose Hundley Sevier (1801–1848), American politician from Arkansas
- Charlotte Sevier (1847–1930), British religious leader
- Corey Sevier (born 1984), Canadian actor
- Hal H. Sevier (1878–1940), American diplomat
- Henry Clay Sevier (1896–1974), American lawyer and politician from Louisiana
- John Sevier (1745–1815), American politician and frontiersman from Tennessee
- Kim Sevier (born 1968), American voice actress
- Valentine Sevier (1747–1800), American pioneer settler from Tennessee
