= Governor Roane =

Governor Roane may refer to:

- Archibald Roane (1759/60–1819), 2nd Governor of Tennessee
- John Selden Roane (1817–1867), 4th Governor of Arkansas
