= Sevier =

Sevier also refer to:

- Sevier, Utah, an unincorporated community in southwestern Sevier County, Utah
- Sevier County, Tennessee
- Sevier County, Utah
- Sevier County, Arkansas
- Sevier River, an endorheic system in Utah
- Sevier orogeny, mountain-building event in western North America 160 to 50 million years ago
- Sevier (surname)
