= Archibald Roane =

American judge

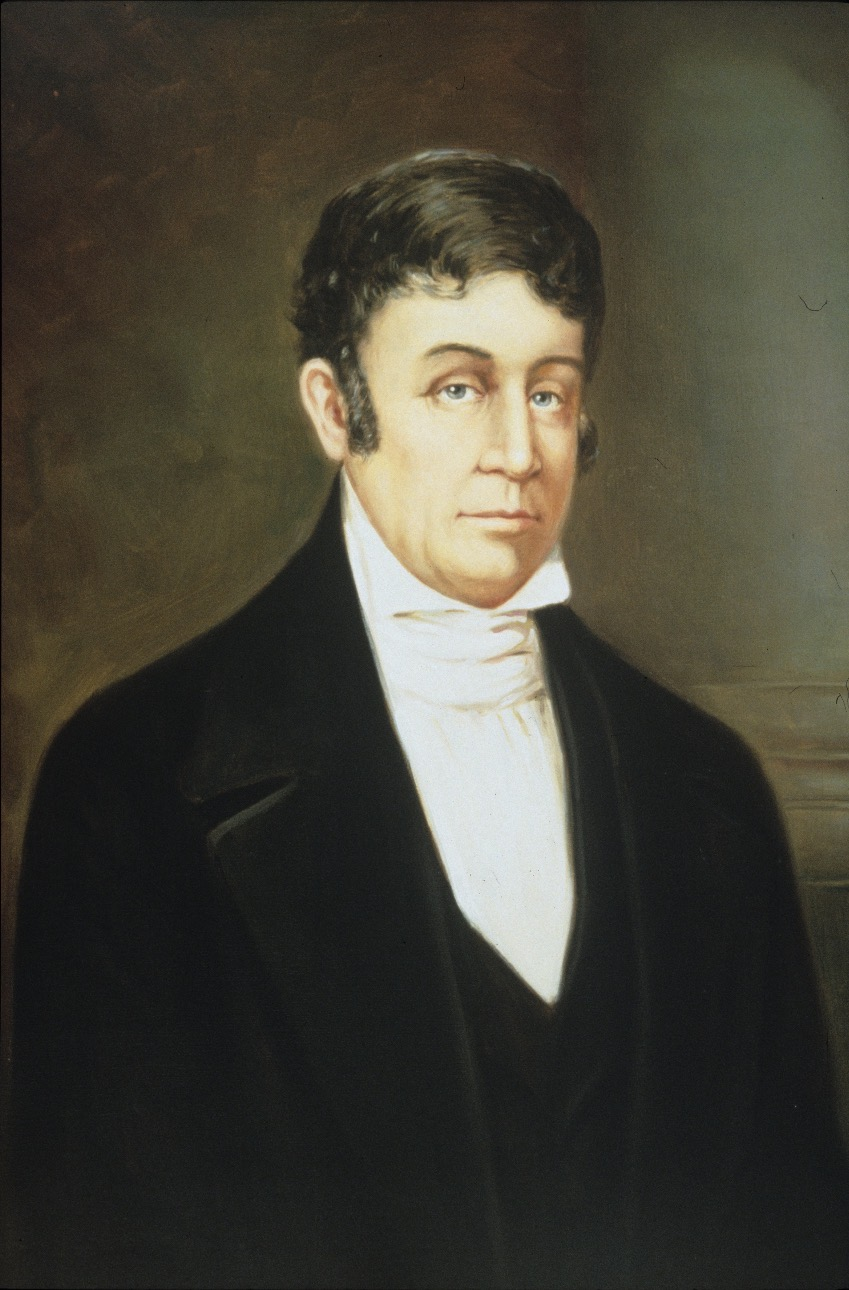
- Portrait by C.J. Fox, c. 1803

2nd Governor of Tennessee
- In office September 23, 1801 – September 23, 1803
- Preceded by: John Sevier
- Succeeded by: John Sevier

Personal details
- Born: 1759 or 1760 Derry Township, Province of Pennsylvania, British America
- Died: January 18, 1819 (aged 58-60) Knox County, Tennessee, U.S.
- Resting place: Pleasant Forest Cemetery, Farragut, Tennessee
- Party: Democratic-Republican
- Spouse: Ann Campbell
- Relations: Spencer Roane (cousin); John Roane (nephew)
- Profession: Attorney

Archibald Roane (1759/60 – January 18, 1819) was the second governor of Tennessee, serving from 1801 to 1803. He won the office after the state's first governor, John Sevier, was prevented by constitutional restrictions from seeking a fourth consecutive term. He quickly became caught up in the growing rivalry between Sevier and Andrew Jackson, and was soundly defeated by Sevier after just one term. Roane served as an attorney general in the Southwest Territory in the early 1790s, and later served as a judge on the state's Superior Court of Law and Equity (1796–1801) and the Supreme Court of Errors and Appeals (1815–1819).

== Early life ==
Roane was born in 1759 or 1760 in Derry Township (then a part of Lancaster County) in the Province of Pennsylvania. He was the son of Andrew and Margaret Walker Roane. Andrew Roane, who was born in Northern Ireland, was one of four sons of Archibald Gilbert Roane, a Scotsman who had been awarded land in Ireland in return for his British military service. All of the sons of Archibald Gilbert Roane emigrated to America. After Andrew and Margaret Roane both died when young Archibald Roane was about eight years old, he was raised by an uncle, John Roane, a Presbyterian minister, who provided him with a good education.

During the Revolutionary War, Archibald Roane served in the Continental Army as a member of the Lancaster County Militia (5th Company, 9th Battalion, Pennsylvania Volunteers). He was among the troops who took part in Washington's crossing of the Delaware River and the subsequent Battle of Trenton in December 1776, and was present at the surrender of General Cornwallis at Yorktown in 1781.

In the 1780s he settled for a time in vicinity of Lexington, Rockbridge County, Virginia, where he studied and later taught at Liberty Hall Academy, a predecessor institution to Washington and Lee University. In Virginia, he married Ann (or Anne) Campbell, whom he had met there, in 1788.

Shortly after his marriage in 1788, Roane moved to Jonesborough, Tennessee, then still a part of North Carolina, where he was admitted to the bar and began the practice of law.

In 1790, when the Southwest Territory was formed, territorial governor William Blount appointed Roane to the position of Attorney and Solicitor for Greene County and later Territorial Attorney General for the Washington District. In 1796, he represented Jefferson County at the state constitutional convention. This convention wrote the original Tennessee Constitution, which took effect that same year when Tennessee became a U.S. state. Later in 1796, he became one of the three judges of the Superior Court of Law and Equity, the highest court established under the new state constitution.

== Governor of Tennessee ==
In 1801, Governor John Sevier had reached the limit of three consecutive terms allowed as governor under the state constitution, and Roane ran virtually unopposed to become his successor. The Great Seal of Tennessee was adopted during the Roane Administration in 1801, and Tennessee was divided into three Congressional districts. Roane also signed anti-fraud measures, a law outlawing dueling, and a law prohibiting the disturbance of public worship. Like his predecessor, much of Roane's time as governor was spent dealing with disputes between white settlers and Indians.

Roane coordinated efforts to begin construction of the Natchez Trace, convincing Secretary of War Henry Dearborn to construct inns and military posts along the road, and provide rewards for the apprehension of bandits who harassed Natchez travellers. He also appointed a commission that successfully resolved a boundary dispute with Virginia. In October 1802, Spain revoked American access to the critical port of New Orleans following the port's transfer to France, and Roane, acting on orders from President Jefferson, prepared the state militia for possible armed conflict. The situation was resolved by the Louisiana Purchase the following year.

In February 1803, the state militia convened to elect its commander. The vote ended in a tie between Sevier and Andrew Jackson, and the constitution stipulated that the governor cast the deciding vote. Jackson presented Roane with evidence that Sevier had been complicit in the forging of deeds at North Carolina's Nashville land office in the 1780s, and Roane cast the deciding vote for Jackson.

Enraged that Jackson, 20 years his junior and lacking in military experience, had defeated him for militia commander, Sevier immediately embarked upon a campaign to regain the governorship. Roane and Jackson released the Nashville land office documents and accused Sevier of trying to thwart an investigation into the matter while he was governor, but Sevier's popularity proved insurmountable. On election day, Sevier defeated Roane, 6,780 votes to 4,923.

== Later life ==
After losing the 1803 gubernatorial election, Roane returned to the practice of law. In 1805, he again challenged Sevier for the governorship, but was defeated, 10,293 votes to 5,795.

In 1811, Roane was elected to a circuit judgeship, and in 1815, he became a judge on the Tennessee Supreme Court of Errors and Appeals, which had replaced the Superior Court of Law and Equity as the state's highest court in 1809. He served on that court until his death on January 18, 1819. He was a promoter of institutions of higher learning until his death, serving as a trustee of Blount College (the forerunner of the University of Tennessee), Greeneville College, and Washington College.

Roane is buried at Pleasant Forest Cemetery in Farragut, Tennessee. In June 1918, the state placed a monument on his grave, which was previously unmarked.

== Legacy ==
Roane County, Tennessee, is named in his honor. Roane County, West Virginia, is named for a cousin, Spencer Roane. A nephew, John Selden Roane, was governor of Arkansas. Archibald Roane's wife, Ann, was a sister of Colonel Arthur Campbell (1743–1811) and Judge David Campbell (1750–1812), an aunt of Governor David Campbell (1779–1859) of Virginia, and a great-aunt of future Tennessee governor William B. Campbell (1807–1867).

Political offices
Preceded by John Sevier	Governor of Tennessee; 1801–1803	Succeeded by John Sevier
