= David Campbell (judge, born 1750) =

American politician and judge

David Campbell (1750–1812) was a politician and judge who was a member of the North Carolina state assembly, a leader in the State of Franklin, and a judge in the North Carolina Superior Court, Southwest Territory, and state of Tennessee.

Born in Augusta County, Virginia, in 1750, Campbell rose to the rank of major while serving in the Continental Army during the American Revolution.

In about 1783, sometime after the war had ended, he moved to Greene County, Tennessee, where he began practicing law. In 1785 he was elected Judge of the Superior Court of the State of Franklin.

In 1787 he was elected to the North Carolina General Assembly and shortly thereafter was elected judge of the Superior Court of North Carolina, Washington District, a post he served in until 1790, when he was appointed to be a territorial judge in the Southwest Territory by President George Washington. From 1797 until 1809, he served as a justice of the Superior Court of Tennessee, where he was twice impeached. His first impeachment came in 1798 during a dispute with Blount (who had himself just been impeached from the United States Senate), involving the Treaty of Holston; Campbell escaped conviction at his impeachment trial by one vote. Campbell was impeached again in 1803, having been charged with bribery, but was once again acquitted.

Campbell died in Washington, Rhea County, Tennessee, in 1812.
