= Valentine Sevier =

American frontiersman

Valentine Sevier II (1747–1800) was a pioneer settler on the Tennessee frontier and a younger brother of John Sevier, the state's first governor.

== Family background ==
Sevier was born in the Colony of Virginia in 1747. He was named after his father, Valentine 'The immigrant' Sevier, who had taken passage from London to America and settled in Augusta County, Virginia in an area which is part of Rockingham County today. His older brother, John Sevier, became the first governor of the state of Tennessee. As a young man, Sevier moved over the Appalachian Mountains to join the Watauga Association when it was established at present day Elizabethton, Tennessee.

== Service ==
During the American Revolutionary War, Sevier fought against the British Regular and Loyalist forces. His younger brother, Robert Sevier, commanded a company of Overmountain Men at the Battle of Kings Mountain and died during battle. Sevier also fought in many actions against Native Americans across the Washington District (part of the eastern division of Tennessee). During the Cherokee–American wars Sevier attained the rank of colonel.

== Life on the frontier ==
Following the war, Sevier moved to the Clarksville area. Here, the family was subjected to frequent attacks by Native Americans. In 1792 he built a small rock fortress for his family and others to take refuge in during these attacks. The structure still stands in the "Boot Hill" section of Clarksville above Red Paint Hill. It was here that the family was attacked on November 11, 1794. Several family members were wounded or killed, including a 12-year-old daughter who was scalped but survived. The fortress is called Sevier Station, and is marked by a historic marker. Sevier's three sons had been killed two years previously by a raiding party under the Chickamauga Cherokee leader, Doublehead, whose band was based at the head of Muscle Shoals.

== Death ==
Valentine Sevier died on February 23, 1800, following a lingering illness. His widow, Naomi "Amy" Douglas Sevier, lived until 1844, dying at the age of 101.
