= Southwest Territory =

US territory (1790–1796)

Territory South of the River Ohio
- Organized incorporated territory of United States
- 1790–1796
- Flag

- Map of the Southwest Territory in 1790
- Capital: Rocky Mount (1790–1792); Knoxville (from 1792)
- Population
  - 1791: 35,691
  - 1795: 77,262
- Government
  - Type: Organized incorporated territory
- Governor
  - 1790–1796: William Blount
- Secretary
  - 1790–1796: Daniel Smith
- Legislature: Territorial Assembly
  - Upper chamber: Territorial Council
  - Lower chamber: House of Representatives
- History
  - Ceded by North Carolina: April 2, 1790
  - Southwest Ordinance (United States Congress): May 26, 1790
  - House convened: February 24, 1794
  - Full Assembly convened: August 26, 1794
  - Tennesseean statehood: June 1, 1796
Preceded by
North Carolina
Watauga Association
State of Franklin
Succeeded by
Tennessee

The Territory South of the River Ohio, commonly known as the Southwest Territory or the Old Southwest Territory, was an organized incorporated territory of the United States that existed from May 26, 1790, until June 1, 1796, when Tennessee was admitted to the Union as its 16th state.

After decades of efforts by trans-Appalachian settlers to establish a separate political entity, including the Watauga Association and the State of Franklin, the Southwest Territory was established by the Southwest Ordinance, which organized lands ceded by North Carolina into a federal territory comprising most of present-day Tennessee.

It was governed under provisions similar to those of the Northwest Ordinance, although slavery was permitted. Its only governor was William Blount, appointed by President George Washington, with Daniel Smith serving as secretary. During its existence, the territorial government negotiated treaties with Native American nations, faced continuing frontier conflict, and progressed through the stages required for statehood. Among those who served in the territorial government were John Sevier, James Robertson, Griffith Rutherford, James Winchester, Archibald Roane, John McNairy, Joseph McMinn, and Andrew Jackson, who would become president of the United States.

After the Territory's population exceeded the threshold established by the Southwest Ordinance, a territorial legislature was organized in 1794, and a constitutional convention met in Knoxville in 1796 to establish the State of Tennessee.

== Background ==
Historical population
Year	Pop.	±%
1770	1,000	—
1780	10,000	+900.0%
1790	35,691	+256.9%
Source: 1770–1780; 1790

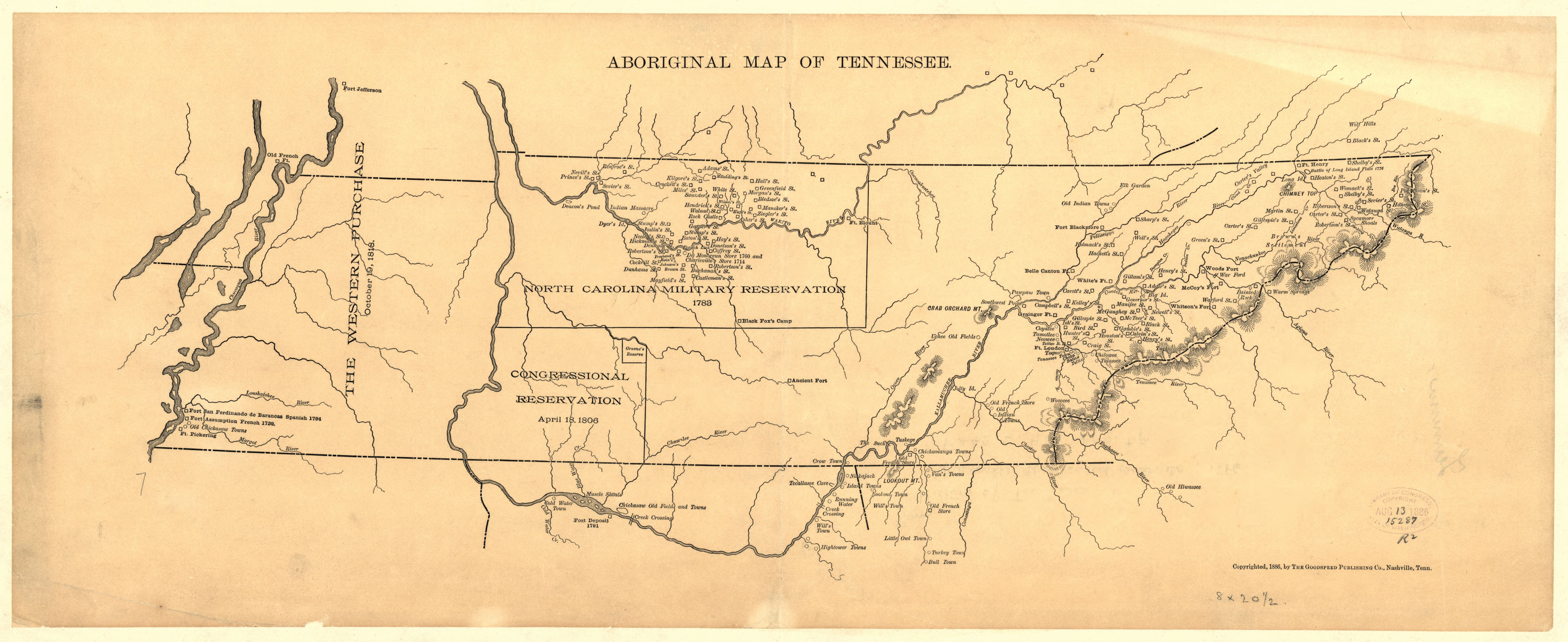
"Aboriginal map of Tennessee" showing North Carolina military reservation containing land to granted to Revolutionary War veterans, as well as the "Western Purchase" made under the 1818 Treaty of Tuscaloosa

During the colonial period, land that would become the Southwest Territory was part of North Carolina's land patent. The Blue Ridge Mountains, which rise along the modern Tennessee-North Carolina border, hindered North Carolina from pursuing any lasting interest in the territory. Initially trade, political interest, and settlement came mostly from Virginia and South Carolina, though refugees from the Regulator War began arriving from North Carolina in the early 1770s.

The Watauga Association was a semi-autonomous government created in 1772 by frontier settlers living along the Watauga River in what is present day Elizabethton, Tennessee. The colony was established on Cherokee-owned land in which the Watauga and Nolichucky settlers had negotiated a 10-year lease directly with the Indians. Fort Watauga was established on the Watauga River at Sycamore Shoals as a trade center of the settlements.

In March 1775, land speculator and North Carolina judge Richard Henderson met with more than 1,200 Cherokees at Sycamore Shoals. Included at the gathering were Cherokee leaders such as Attacullaculla, Oconostota, and Dragging Canoe. The meeting resulted in the "Treaty of Sycamore Shoals", in which Henderson purchased from the Cherokee all the land situated south of the Ohio River and lying between the Cumberland River, the Cumberland Mountains, and the Kentucky River. This land, which encompassed roughly 20 million acres (80,000 km^{2}), became known as the Transylvania Purchase. Henderson's land deal was found to be in violation of North Carolina and Virginia law, as well as the Royal Proclamation of 1763, which had prohibited the private purchase of American Indian land.

Both North Carolina and Virginia considered the trans-Appalachian settlements illegal, and refused to annex them. Nevertheless, at the onset of the American War for Independence in 1776, the settlers, who vigorously supported the Patriot cause, organized themselves into the "Washington District" and formed a committee of safety to govern it. In July 1776, Dragging Canoe and the faction of the Cherokee opposed to the Transylvania Purchase (later called the Chickamaugas) aligned with the British and launched an invasion of the Watauga settlements, targeting Fort Watauga at modern Elizabethton and Eaton's Station near modern Kingsport. After the settlers thwarted the attacks, North Carolina agreed to annex the settlements as the Washington District.

In September 1780, a large group of trans-Appalachian settlers, led by William Campbell, John Sevier and Isaac Shelby, assembled at Sycamore Shoals in response to a British threat to attack frontier settlements. Known as the Overmountain Men, the settlers marched across the mountains to South Carolina, where they engaged and defeated a loyalist force led by Patrick Ferguson at the Battle of Kings Mountain. Overmountain Men would also take part in the Battle of Musgrove Mill and the Battle of Cowpens.

In 1784, North Carolina ceded control of the Overmountain settlements following a hotly contested vote. The cession was rescinded later that year, but not before some of the settlers had organized the State of Franklin, which sought statehood. John Sevier was named governor and the area began operating as an independent state not recognized by the Congress of the Confederation. Many Overmountain settlers, led by John Tipton, remained loyal to North Carolina, and frequently quarreled with the Franklinites. Following Tipton's defeat of Sevier at the "Battle of Franklin" in early 1788, the State of Franklin movement declined. The Franklinites had agreed to rejoin North Carolina by early 1789.

== Territory formation ==
North Carolina ratified the United States Constitution on November 21, 1789. On December 22, the state legislature voted to cede the Overmountain settlements as payment of its obligations to the new federal government. Congress accepted the cession during its first session on April 2, 1790, when it passed "An Act to Accept a Cession of the Claims of the State of North Carolina to a Certain District of Western Territory". On May 26, 1790, Congress passed an act organizing the new cession as the "Territory of the United States South of the River Ohio", which consisted of modern Tennessee, with the exception of later minor boundary changes. However, most of the new territory was under Indian control, with territorial administration initially covering two unconnected areas—the Washington District in what is now northeast Tennessee, and the Mero District around Nashville. The act also merged the office of territorial governor with the office of Superintendent of Indian Affairs for the Southern Department.

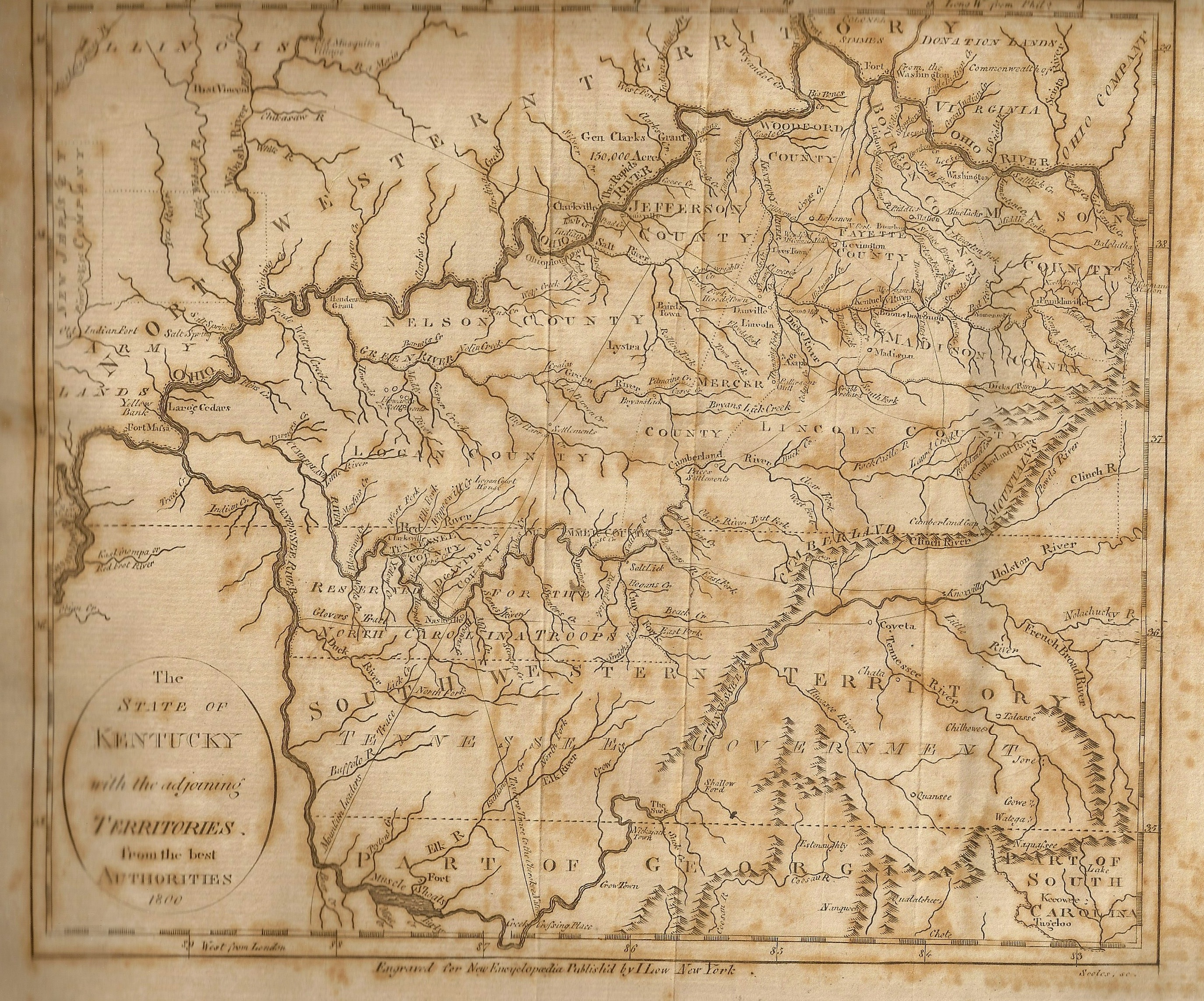
Low's map, "The State of Kentucky and adjoining Territories". The Southwest Territory did not yet include West Tennessee, which was still under control of Indians. From Low's Encyclopaedia

The new territory was essentially governed under the same provisions as the Northwest Ordinance, a 1787 act enacted for the creation of the Northwest Territory north of the Ohio River. The Northwest Ordinance's provision outlawing slavery was not applied to the Southwest Territory, however. Along with rules of governance, the Ordinance outlined steps a territory could take to gain admission to the Union. The first step involved the organization of a territorial government. The next step, which would take place when the territory had at least 5,000 adult males, was to organize a territorial legislature, with a popularly elected lower chamber and an upper chamber appointed by the president. The final step, which would take place when the territory had a population of at least 60,000, was to write a state constitution and elect a state government, at which time the territory would be admitted to the Union.

Several candidates were put forth for governor of the new territory. William Blount, a Constitutional Convention delegate and former state legislator who had championed the causes of western settlers, was supported by key North Carolina politicians such as Hugh Williamson, Timothy Bloodworth, John B. Ashe and Benjamin Hawkins. Blount, an aggressive land speculator, had extensive land holdings in the new territory. Virginia's Patrick Henry called for his friend, General Joseph Martin, to be appointed governor. A small group of ex-Franklinites convened in Greeneville to push for the appointment of John Sevier.

On June 8, 1790, President George Washington chose Blount as the territory's new governor. He also appointed Daniel Smith the territory's Secretary, and named two of the territory's three judges, John McNairy and David Campbell (Joseph Anderson would eventually be chosen as the third judge). John Sevier was appointed brigadier general of the Washington District militia, and James Robertson was appointed brigadier general of the Mero District militia.

In September 1790, Blount visited Washington at Mount Vernon, and was sworn in by Supreme Court justice James Iredell. He then moved to the new territory, where he set up a temporary capital at Rocky Mount, the home of William Cobb in Sullivan County. He recruited North Carolina publisher George Roulstone to establish a newspaper, the Knoxville Gazette (initially published at Rogersville). He spent most of October and November issuing appointments to lower-level administrative and militia positions. In December, he made the dangerous trip across Indian territory to the Mero District, where he likewise issued appointments, before returning to Rocky Mount by the end of the year.

Blount initially wanted the permanent territorial capital to be located at the confluence of the Clinch and Tennessee rivers (in the vicinity of modern Kingston), where he had extensive land claims, but was unable to convince the Cherokee to relinquish ownership of these lands. He therefore chose James White's Fort, an outpost located further upstream along the Tennessee. In 1791, White's son-in-law, Charles McClung, platted the new city, and lots were sold in October of that year. Blount named the new city "Knoxville" after his superior in the War Department, Henry Knox.

In the 1790 United States census, 7 counties in the Southwest Territory reported the following population counts:

Rank	County	Population
1	Greene	7,741
2	Hawkins	6,970
3	Washington	5,872
4	Sullivan	4,447
5	Davidson	3,459
6	Sumner	2,196
7	Tennessee	1,387
	Unincorporated	3,619
	Southwest Territory	35,691

== Indian hostilities ==
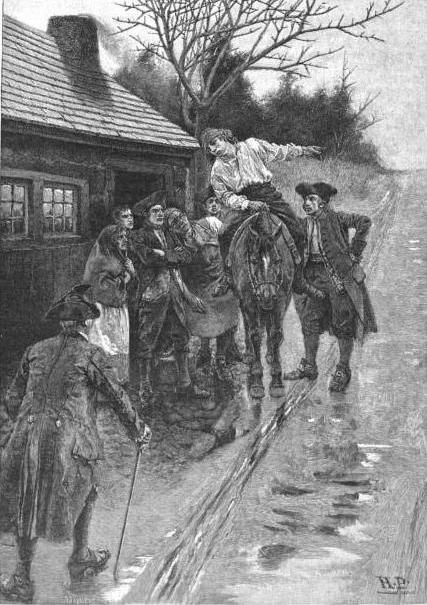
Howard Pyle's depiction of a scout warning the residents of Knoxville of an approaching hostile Indian force in 1793

Residents of the Southwest Territory initially welcomed federal control, believing the federal government would provide better protection from hostile Indians than North Carolina's distant government to the east. However, the Federal government was already more focused on critical affairs in the old Northwest Territory. Most of the land in the "Old Southwest" was still either Indian territory or had already been claimed by speculators or settlers, and thus there was little money to be made from land sales. President Washington issued a proclamation forbidding the violation of the Treaty of Hopewell (which had set Indian boundaries), and Secretary of War Knox frequently accused settlers of illegally encroaching on Indian lands. Blount was consistently torn between placating angry frontiersmen and appeasing his superiors in the Federal government.

In the Summer of 1791, Blount negotiated the Treaty of Holston with the Cherokee at the future site of Knoxville. The Treaty brought lands south of the French Broad River and east of the divide between Little River and the Little Tennessee River (essentially modern Cocke, Sevier and Blount counties) under U.S. control, and guaranteed the Territory use of a road between the Washington and Mero districts, as well as the Tennessee River. The following year, Blount negotiated an agreement clarifying land boundaries with the Chickasaw, who controlled what is now West Tennessee.

In spite of these agreements, continued encroachment by settlers onto Indian lands prompted reprisals, which primarily came from hostile Chickamauga Cherokee and Creek Indians. The Spanish, who controlled Florida along the Gulf of Mexico coast and still disputed the southern borders of the United States, fifteen years after the end of the Revolutionary War, encouraged and armed the southern tribes. These attacks persisted throughout 1792 and 1793, with the Mero settlements bearing the brunt of the hostilities. Ziegler's Station near modern Hendersonville was destroyed, and Mero defenders had to rally to thwart a large invasion at Buchanan's Station near Nashville. In spite of growing impatience from frontiersmen, Secretary of War Knox refused to authorize an invasion of Indian territory.

In September 1793, while Blount was away in Philadelphia, a large group of Cherokee invaders overran Cavet's Station west of Knoxville, and were planning to march on Knoxville before the invading force dissolved due to infighting among chiefs. Territorial Secretary Daniel Smith, who was Acting Governor in Blount's absence, summoned the militia and ordered an invasion of Cherokee territory. Militia General Sevier led the militia south and destroyed several Chickamauga villages. While Blount supported Smith's decision, the invasion angered Knox, who refused to issue pay for the militiamen. In September 1794, Robertson, without authorization from Knox, dispatched a mounted American force under James Ore which destroyed the Chickamauga towns of Nickajack and Running Water. Robertson resigned as brigadier general shortly afterward.

The defeat of northern tribes at the Battle of Fallen Timbers in August 1794, the destruction of Nickajack and Running Water, and the resolving of boundary disputes between the United States and Spain led to a decline in hostile Indian attacks. In November 1794, Blount negotiated an end to the Cherokee–American wars at the Tellico Blockhouse, a federal outpost south of Knoxville.

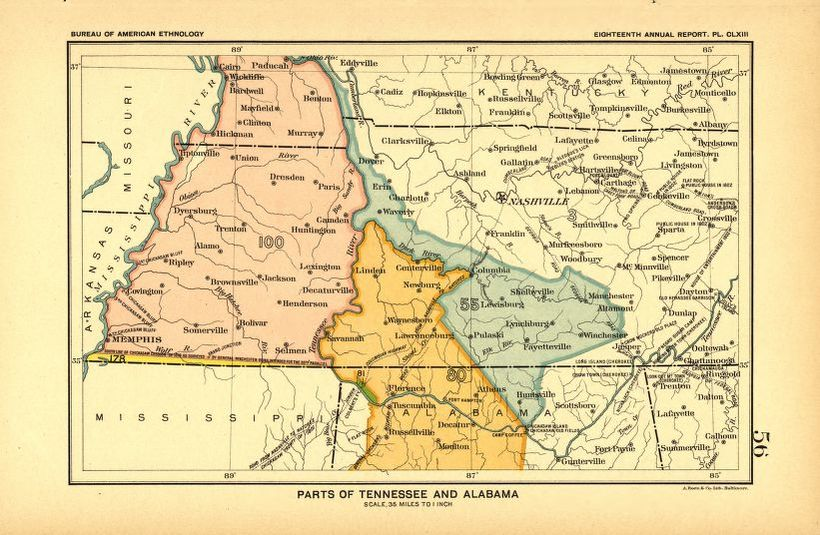
Indian land cessions in what is now Tennessee (Charles C. Royce, 1899)

== Statehood ==
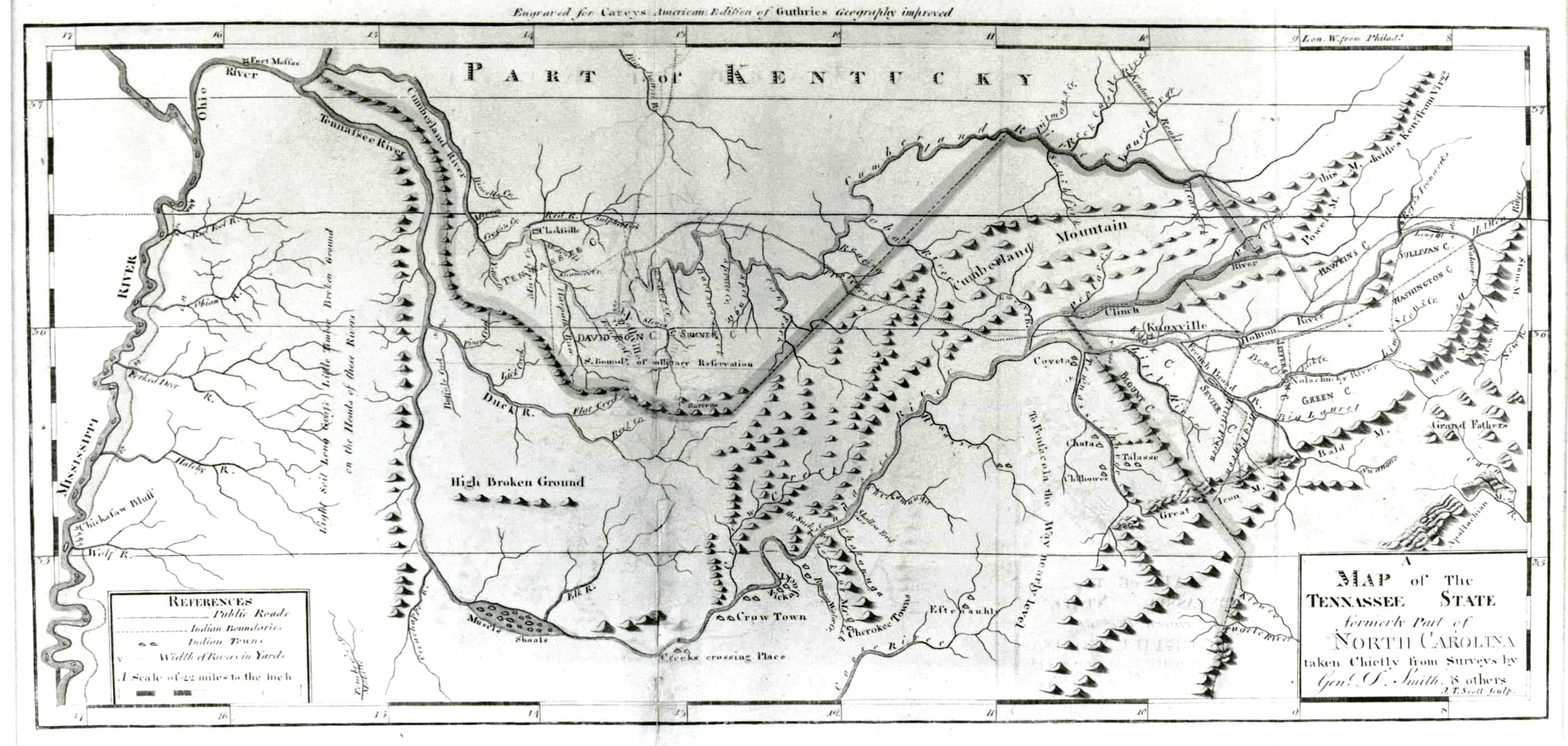
Secretary Daniel Smith's "Map of the Tennassee State" (1796)

A census in the summer of 1791 showed the territory's population to be 35,691. There were 6,271 free adult white males, more than the 5,000 needed for the territory to organize a legislature. Blount, however, waited until 1793 to call for elections. Members of the territorial House of Representatives (the lower chamber of the legislature) were elected in December 1793, and the first House session convened on February 24, 1794. The representatives nominated ten individuals for appointment to the territorial council (the legislature's upper chamber), five of whom—Griffith Rutherford, John Sevier, James Winchester, Stockley Donelson and Parmenas Taylor—were eventually appointed by President Washington. Rutherford was chosen as the council's president.

The assembly first convened on August 26, 1794, and called for immediate steps to be taken to achieve full statehood. The assembly appointed Dr. James White (not to be confused with Knoxville's founder) as its non-voting representative in Congress, making the Southwest Territory one of the first U.S. territories to make use of this power. A special session of the assembly on June 29, 1795, called for a census to be taken the following month to determine if the territory's population had reached the 60,000 threshold required for statehood. The census revealed a population of 77,262 inhabitants.

After the census, the territory moved swiftly to form a state government. In December 1795, counties elected delegates for the state constitutional convention. This convention met in Knoxville in January 1796, and drafted a new state constitution. The name "Tennessee", which had been in common use since 1793 when Secretary Smith published his "Short Description of the Tennassee Government", was chosen as the new name for the state.

The Northwest Ordinance was vague on the final steps to be taken for a state to be fully admitted to the Union, so Tennessee's leaders proceeded to organize a state government. John Sevier was elected governor, the first Tennessee General Assembly convened in March 1796, and Blount notified the Secretary of State, Timothy Pickering, that the territorial government had been terminated. A copy of the state constitution was delivered to Pickering by future governor Joseph McMinn. Blount and William Cocke were chosen as the state's U.S. Senators, and Andrew Jackson was elected the state's representative. As the Southwest Territory was the first federal territory to petition to join the Union, there was confusion in Congress about how to proceed. Nonetheless, Tennessee was admitted to the Union on June 1, 1796, as the 16th state.

== Government and law ==
Portfolio	Minister	Took office	Left office
Officials of the Southwest Territory
Governor	William Blount	1790	1796
Secretary	Daniel Smith	1790	1796
Judge	John McNairy	1790	1796
Judge	David Campbell	1790	1796
Judge	Joseph Anderson	1790	1796
Council President	Griffith Rutherford	1794	1796
Speaker of the House	David Wilson	1794	1795
Speaker of the House	Joseph Hardin	1795	1796
Brigadier General	John Sevier	1790	1796
Brigadier General	James Robertson	1790	1794
Delegate to Congress	James White	1794	1796

The Southwest Territory was governed under an act of Congress, "An Act for the Government of the Territory of the United States, South of the River Ohio" (Southwest Ordinance), passed May 26, 1790. This act essentially mirrored the earlier Northwest Ordinance, the key difference being over slavery, which was prohibited by the Northwest Ordinance, but not the Southwest Ordinance. Both ordinances provided for freedom of religion and the sanctity of contracts, barred legal primogeniture, and encouraged the establishment of schools and respect for the liberty of the Indians.

The supreme power in the territory rested in the governor, who was appointed by the President of the United States. He was assisted by the Secretary, also appointed by the President. Legislative powers rested in a bicameral territorial assembly consisting of the House of Representatives (lower chamber) and the Territorial Council (upper chamber). Representatives were popularly elected, whereas councilors were appointed by the President. Judicial power rested in three judges appointed by the President. Brigadier generals of the territorial militia were also appointed by the President. Lower administrative, judicial and military officers were appointed by the governor.

=== Executive ===
The Governor of the Southwest Territory had supreme authority in the territory. The governor could decree ordinances, propose and enact new laws, create towns and counties, and license lawyers. Though the territorial assembly held legislative powers, the governor held veto power over all proposed laws. The governor was responsible for appointing the lower territorial administrative officers, including attorneys general, justices of the peace, registers, and court clerks. He recommended candidates for brigadier general to the President, and appointed lower militia officers. The governor also served as the Superintendent of Indian Affairs for the Southern Department, the federal government's chief diplomat to the Southern tribes. To serve as governor, an individual had to own at least 1,000 acres (400 ha) of land in the territory. William Blount served as Governor of the Southwest Territory throughout the territory's existence.

The Secretary of the Southwest Territory was the official record-keeper of the territory. The Secretary also served as acting governor if the governor was absent or incapacitated. To serve as Secretary, an individual had to own at least 500 acres (200 ha) of land in the territory. Daniel Smith served as Secretary throughout the territory's existence.

=== Legislature ===
The Southwest Territory in 1790

Legislative power in the Southwest Territory initially rested with the governor, who consulted with the three territorial judges on new laws. After the territory's population of white males reached 5,000, the territory could form a legislative assembly (the power to summon the assembly rested with the governor). The assembly consisted of an upper chamber, the Territorial Council (the role of which was similar to that of a state senate), and a lower chamber, the House of Representatives. While the assembly could propose new laws, the governor could still veto any bill. To serve on the council, an individual had to own at least 500 acres (200 ha) of land in the territory.

The territorial House of Representatives consisted of thirteen popularly elected members. These members elected a speaker from their own ranks. The House first convened at Knoxville on February 24, 1794. Its members were John Tipton (Washington), George Rutledge (Sullivan), Joseph Hardin (Greene), William Cocke (Hawkins), Joseph McMinn (Hawkins), Alexander Kelly (Knox), John Beard (Knox), Samuel Wear (Jefferson), George Doharty (Jefferson), David Wilson (Sumner), Dr. James White (Davidson) and James Ford (Tennessee County). Wilson, of Sumner County, served as Speaker from 1794 to 1795. Hardin, of Greene, served as Speaker from 1795 to 1796. Hopkins Lacy was elected clerk.

Members of the territorial council were appointed by the President from a list of candidates submitted by the territorial House of Representatives. At its first session in February 1794, the House submitted ten candidates for the council: James Winchester, William Fort, Stockley Donelson, Richard Gammon, David Russell, John Sevier, Adam Meek, John Adair, Griffith Rutherford and Parmenas Taylor. From this list, President Washington appointed Winchester, Donelson, Sevier, Rutherford and Taylor. Rutherford was chosen as council president (a role similar to speaker).

The Northwest Ordinance allowed a territory's assembly to elect a representative to the United States Congress. This representative could consult with congressmen on legislation, but could not vote. In 1794, the Southwest Territory's assembly chose Dr. James White as its non-voting representative to Congress. The Southwest Territory was the first U.S. territory to exercise this power, and White's efforts in Congress set a precedent for future territorial delegates.

=== Judiciary ===
The territory's supreme judicial power rested in three judges, each appointed by the President. The governor appointed court clerks, attorneys general and lower judicial offices, as well as justices of the peace. Along with their judicial powers, the judges could consult with the governor on new legislation, though the governor held final veto power over any proposed laws. To serve as a judge, an individual had to own at least 500 acres (200 ha) of land in the territory. The judges appointed by President Washington in 1790 were John McNairy (1762–1837), David Campbell (1750–1812), and Joseph Anderson (1757–1837). Blount appointed Francis Alexander Ramsey clerk of the Washington District's superior court of law, Andrew Russell clerk of the Washington District's court of equity, David Allison clerk of Mero's superior court of law, and Joseph Sitgreaves clerk of Mero's court of equity.

The courts of the Southwest Territory were generally more highly regarded than other branches of government. Frontiersmen had for years relied on county courts to settle disputes, and upon being appointed governor, Blount left the existing county courts largely intact. These courts generally followed old North Carolina laws when rendering decisions, relying heavily on James Iredell's Revisal of the Laws of North Carolina (1791). Along with hearing criminal and civil cases, courts were responsible for licensing ferries, regulating taverns, and designating public gristmills. Courts occasionally rendered financial assistance for internal improvements and relief for the destitute. County sheriffs were responsible for collecting taxes.

Lawyers were licensed by the governor to practice in the territory's courts. Notable individuals licensed to practice in the territory included future president Andrew Jackson, future governor Archibald Roane, future congressman John Rhea, and Blount's younger half-brother, future governor Willie Blount. Jackson served as a district attorney for the territory.

== Land details ==
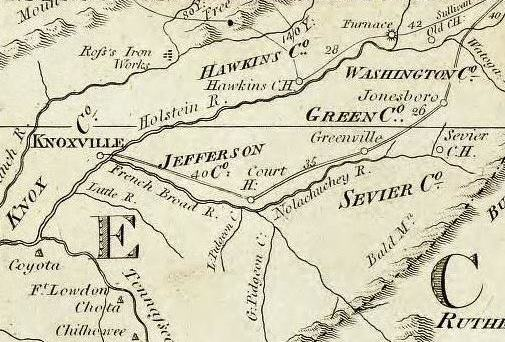
The Washington District, as it appeared on Abraham Bradley's 1796 postal map

The Southwest Territory covered 43,000 square miles (110,000 km^{2}), consisting of what is now Tennessee, with the exception of a few minor boundary changes resulting from later surveys. To its north was Virginia's District of Kentucky, which became the 15th U.S. state in 1792. The lands to the territory's south were at the time either still claimed by Georgia, or disputed with Spain, but subsequently consolidated into the Mississippi Territory.

At its creation in 1790, the Southwest Territory's administration oversaw two unconnected districts—the Washington District in the northeast, and the Mero District in the area around and north of Nashville. The remainder of the territory remained under Indian control, with the Cherokee being the dominant tribe in the east, and the Chickasaw controlling the western part of the territory. Other important tribes included the Creeks and Choctaw.

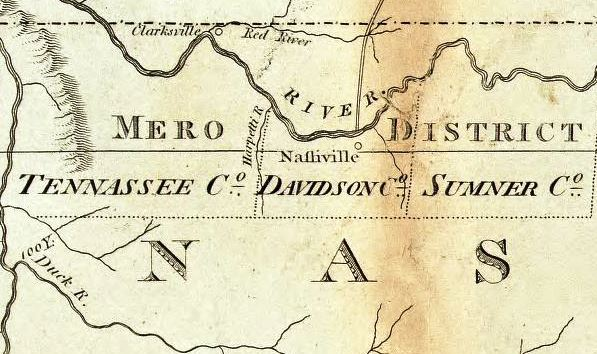
The Mero District, as it appeared on Bradley's 1796 postal map

The Washington District initially included lands north of the French Broad River and northeast of the confluence of the Clinch and Tennessee rivers (near modern Kingston). The 1791 Treaty of Holston pushed the boundary south of the French Broad and southeast to the divide between Little River and the Little Tennessee River (in what is now southern Blount County). The Washington District originally included Washington, Sullivan, Greene and Hawkins counties. Knox and Jefferson were created by Governor Blount in 1792. In 1793, Blount organized these two new counties into a separate district, called the "Hamilton District". Blount and Sevier counties would be added to this new district during territorial administration.

The Mero District included the lands around Nashville and along the Cumberland River, north to the modern Kentucky border. It included three counties—Davidson, Sumner and Tennessee. The Mero and Washington districts were connected by a road, generally known as Avery's Trace, which traversed Indian lands.

The population of the Southwest Territory in 1791 was 35,691. This included 3,417 slaves and 361 free persons of color. The population of the Washington District was 28,649, while the population of Mero was 7,042. The territory's 1795 census showed a total population of 77,262 inhabitants, including 10,613 slaves and 973 free persons of color. The population of the Washington and Hamilton districts was 65,338, and the population of Mero was 11,924.

== See also ==
- Indian Reserve (1763)
- Overhill Cherokee
- United States Attorney for the District of Tennessee
