= Treaty of Holston =

1791 treaty between the U.S. and the Cherokees

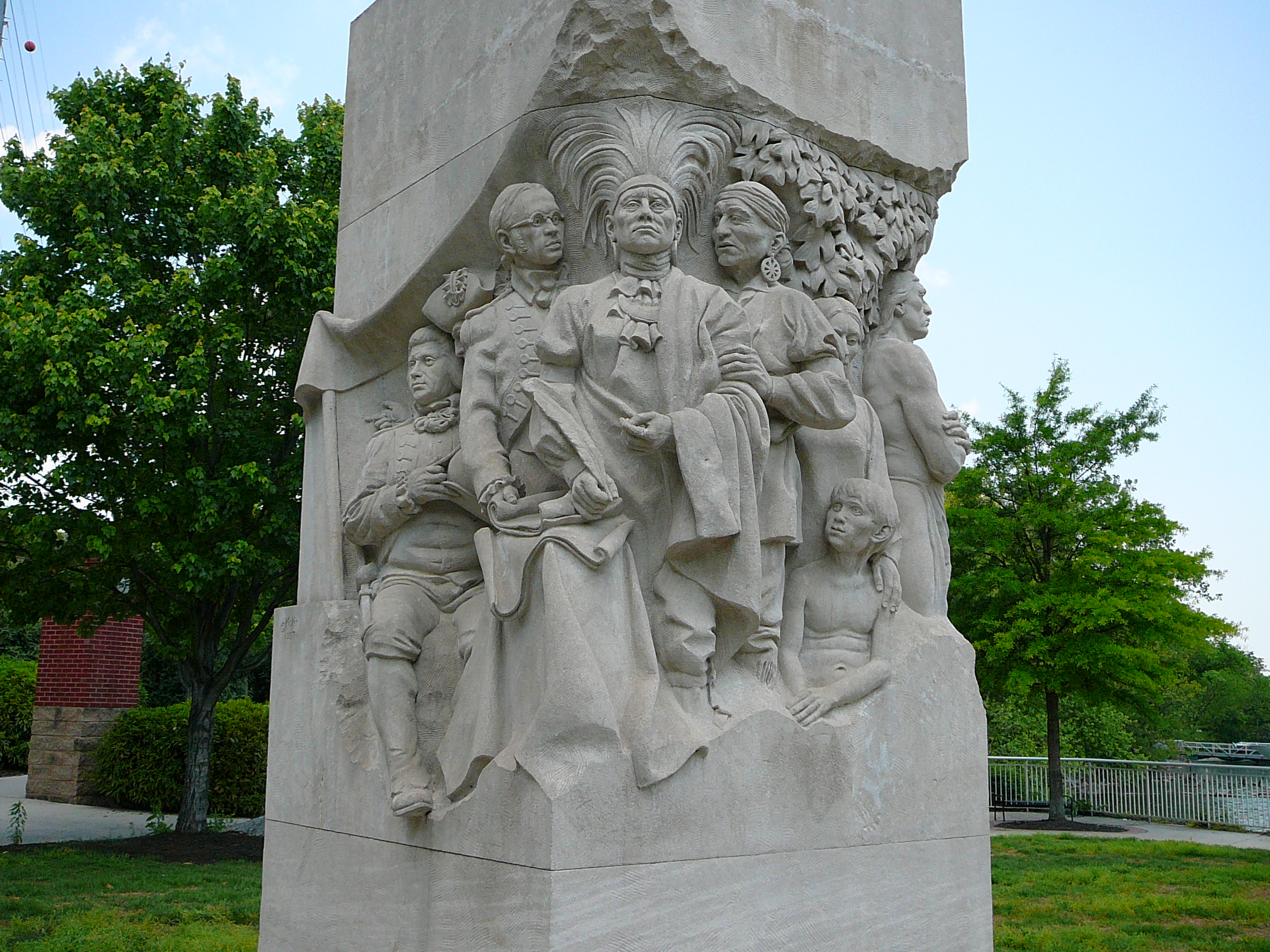
Statue representing the signing of the Treaty of the Holston in Downtown Knoxville

The Treaty of Holston (or Treaty of the Holston) was a treaty between the United States government and the Cherokee signed on July 2, 1791, and proclaimed on February 7, 1792. It was negotiated and signed by William Blount, governor of the Southwest Territory and superintendent of Indian affairs for the southern district of the United States, and various representatives of the Cherokee peoples, most notably John Watts. The treaty established terms of relations between the United States and the Cherokee; that the Cherokee tribes were to fall under the protection of the United States, with the United States managing all future foreign affairs for all the loosely affiliated Cherokee tribes.

A monument to the treaty, erected in 1997, is located on the banks of the Tennessee River in downtown Knoxville, Tennessee, where the treaty was negotiated.

== Terms ==
This treaty mentions the following:

- Establishment of perpetual peace and friendship between the two peoples.
- Cherokees acknowledge the protection of the United States.
- Prisoners of war to be returned.
- Boundaries were established between the Cherokee lands and the United States.
- Stipulation of a road by the United States.
- United States to regulate trade.
- Guarantees by the United States that the lands of the Cherokee people have not been ceded to the United States.
- No U.S. citizens may settle within the Cherokee lands; those who do may be punished by the Cherokee.
- No U.S. citizens may hunt within the Cherokee lands.
- The Cherokee must deliver criminals to the United States.
- U.S. citizens committing crimes within the Cherokee areas are to be punished.
- Retaliation restrained by both nations.
- Cherokees to give notice of pending attacks by other tribes against the United States.
- United States to make presents to the Cherokees for the promotion of having the Cherokees take up an agrarian culture.
- Both peoples to cease any animosities held against each other.

An addendum to the treaty was signed by Henry Knox, Secretary of War, representing the United States and representatives of the Cherokee on February 17, 1792, and proclaimed on the same day, which increased the annuities paid by the United States to the Cherokee leaders. Below is an excerpt from a letter of the War Department Dated January 17, 1792, by Secretary of War Henry Knox:

"That the main business of the said Cherokees seems to consist in the following points: 1st, To obtain a higher annual compensation for the lands they relinquished by the treaty with Governor Blount, on the 2d day of July 1791. 2dly, That the white people who are settled to the southward of the ridge which divides the waters of the Tenassee from those of Little River, should be removed, and that the said ridge should be the barrier. 3dly, That a person of Reputation should be commissioned on behalf of the general Government to reside in the Cherokee Nation, who should at once be their Counsellor and protector. 4thly, That the projected settlement of the Tenassee Company at the muscle shoals, should be prevented.1 5thly, That the annual allowance of Goods should be now furnished together with some ploughs and other implements of husbandry, as mentioned in the Treaty. 6thly, That John Thompson, who is a half Creek and James Carey, should be appointed interpreters agreeably to the recommendation of Governor Blount—it is proposed to add George Miller, the full-blooded Cherokee to the Interpreter⟨s⟩—He has claims on the Government for services in the North Carolina troops—having as he alleges, served with them for several years. He is young, good-humoured, well disposed to the United States, and his appointment would be highly grateful to the Indians, as well as to himself, and would be considered as a reward for his past services which must now be supported by evidence."

== See also ==
- List of treaties
- List of Cherokee treaties
