= John Sevier =

American soldier, frontiersman and politician (1745-1815)

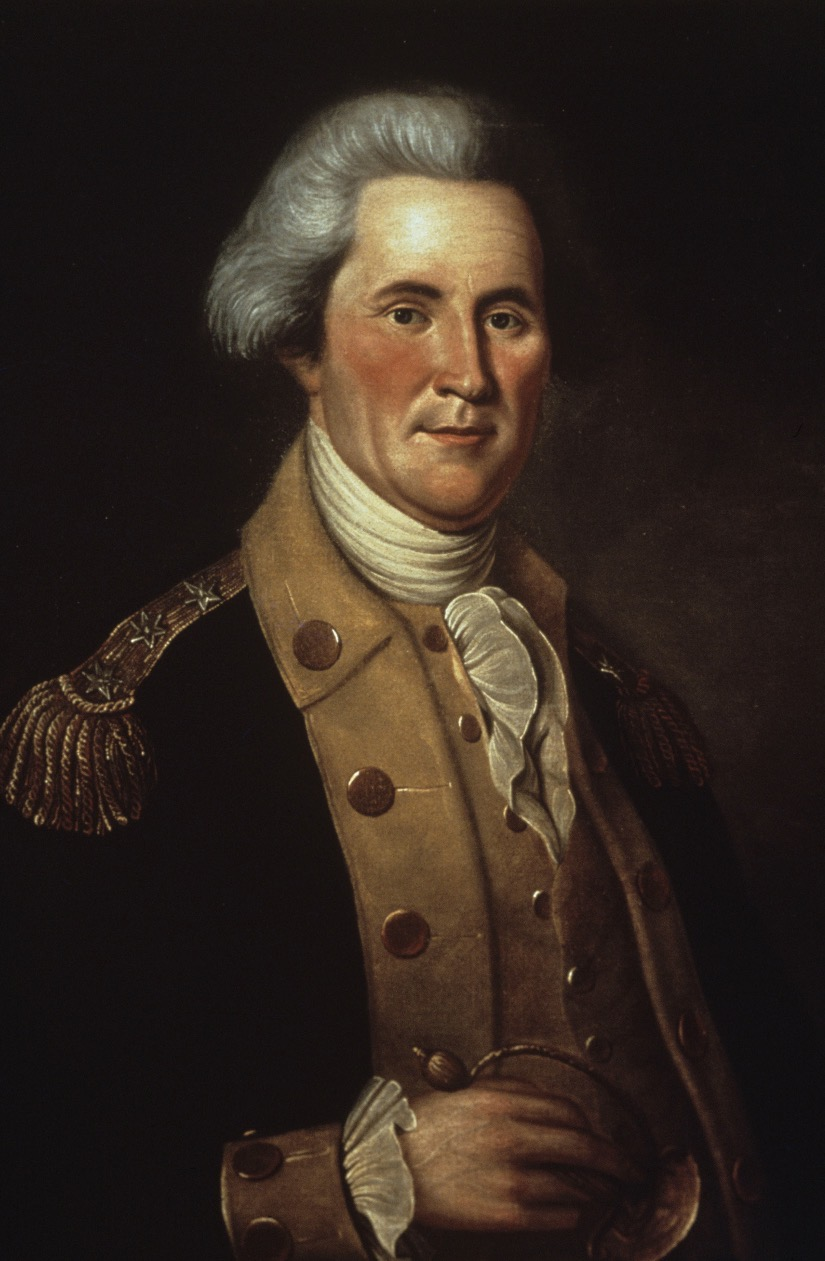
- Portrait by Charles Willson Peale, c. 1792

1st Governor of Tennessee
- In office September 23, 1803 – September 20, 1809
- Preceded by: Archibald Roane
- Succeeded by: Willie Blount
- In office March 30, 1796 – September 23, 1801
- Preceded by: William Blount (Southwest Territory)
- Succeeded by: Archibald Roane

Member of the U.S. House of Representatives
- In office March 4, 1811 – September 24, 1815
- Preceded by: Robert Weakley
- Succeeded by: William Grainger Blount
- Constituency: Tennessee 2nd
- In office June 16, 1790 – March 3, 1791
- Preceded by: Office established
- Succeeded by: William Barry Grove
- Constituency: North Carolina 5th

Governor of Franklin (Extra-legal state)
- In office March 1785 – February 1788
- Preceded by: Richard Caswell (North Carolina)
- Succeeded by: Samuel Johnston (North Carolina)

Personal details
- Born: September 23, 1745 Augusta County, Colony of Virginia, British America
- Died: September 24, 1815 (aged 70) Alabama Territory, U.S.
- Resting place: Knox County Courthouse; Knoxville, Tennessee
- Party: Democratic-Republican Party
- Spouse(s): Sarah Hawkins (1761–1780, her death); Catherine "Bonny Kate" Sherrill (1780–1815, his death)
- Children: 18

Military service
- Allegiance: Virginia; United States
- Branch/service: Virginia Militia (1773–1774); North Carolina Militia (1781–1783); State of Franklin Militia (1784–1788); Southwest Territorial Militia (1790–1796) (Tennessee)
- Years of service: 1773–1796 (militias)
- Rank: Brigadier General
- Commands: Colonel of the Washington District Regiment
- Battles/wars: Lord Dunmore's War; American Revolutionary War • Fort Watauga (1776) • Kings Mountain (1780); Cherokee–American wars • Boyd's Creek (1780) • Flint Creek (1789) • Hightower (1793)

John Sevier (September 23, 1745 – September 24, 1815) was an American soldier, frontiersman, and politician, and one of the founding fathers of Tennessee. A member of the Democratic-Republican Party, he played a leading role in Tennessee's pre-statehood period, both militarily and politically, and he was elected the state's first governor in 1796. He served as a colonel of the Washington District Regiment in the Battle of Kings Mountain in 1780, and he commanded the frontier militia in dozens of battles against the Cherokee in the 1780s and 1790s.

Sevier settled in the Tennessee Valley frontier in the 1770s. In 1776, he was elected one of five magistrates of the Watauga Association and helped defend Fort Watauga against an assault by the Cherokee. At the outbreak of the American Revolutionary War, he was chosen as a member of the Committee of Safety for the association's successor, the Washington District. Following the Battle of Kings Mountain, he led an invasion that destroyed several Cherokee towns in northern Georgia. In the 1780s, he served as the only governor of the State of Franklin, an early attempt at statehood by the trans-Appalachian settlers. He was brigadier general of the Southwest Territory militia during the early 1790s.

Sevier served six two-year terms as Tennessee's governor: from 1796 until 1801, and from 1803 to 1809, totaling 11 years. Term limits prevented a fourth consecutive term in both instances. His political career was marked by a growing rivalry with rising politician Andrew Jackson, which nearly culminated in a duel in 1803. After his last term as governor, Sevier was elected to three terms in the United States House of Representatives from Tennessee, serving from 1811 until his death in 1815.

== Early life ==
John Sevier (US: /səˈvɪər/) was born in 1745 in Augusta County in the Colony of Virginia, near the present-day town of New Market. His birthplace is now part of modern-day Rockingham County.

John Sevier was the oldest of seven children of Valentine Sevier "the Immigrant" and Joanna Goad. Valentine was of French Huguenot background and his name was an anglicization of Xavier derived from the village Xavier in present-day Spain. He immigrated from England to Baltimore in 1740 and gradually made his way to the back country and Shenandoah Valley. One of his brothers, Valentine Sevier, became a frontiersman, Revolutionary War officer, and the builder of the Sevier Station frontier outpost.

Sevier's father worked variously as a tavern keeper, fur trader, and land speculator; young John pursued similar work. At an early age he opened his own tavern, and he helped found New Market. The town claims Sevier as its founder.

In 1761 at age 16, Sevier married Sarah Hawkins and initially settled into a life of farming. Some sources suggest Sevier served as a captain in the Virginia colonial militia, under George Washington, in Lord Dunmore's War in 1773 and 1774.

== Watauga Association and Washington District ==
In the early 1770s, Sevier and his brother Valentine began making trips to various settlements on the trans-Appalachian frontier, in what is now northeastern Tennessee. In late 1773, Sevier moved his family to the Carter Valley settlements along the Holston River. Three years later, he relocated further south to the Watauga settlements, in what is now Elizabethton, Tennessee. The Wataugans had leased their lands from the Cherokee in 1772 and had formed a fledgling government known as the Watauga Association. Sevier was appointed clerk of the Association's five-man court in 1775 and was elected to the court in 1776.

The Royal Proclamation of 1763 forbade Anglo-American settlement on Indian lands west of the Appalachian Mountains. As the Watauga settlements were in Cherokee territory, British colonial authorities considered them illegal. In March 1775, the settlers purchased the lands from the Cherokee, with Sevier listed as a witness to the agreement. The Crown refused to recognize the purchase, however, and continued to demand that the settlers leave. A band of Cherokee led by Dragging Canoe disagreed with the tribe's sale of communal lands, and began making threats against the settlers.

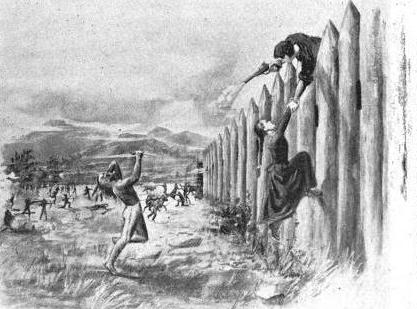
Sketch in Goodpasture's History of Tennessee (1903), showing Sevier pulling Catherine Sherrill to safety during the Cherokee assault on Fort Watauga

== American Revolutionary War ==
With the outbreak of the American Revolution, in April 1775, the Wataugans, most of whom were sympathetic to the Patriot cause, organized the Washington District and formed a 13-member Committee of Safety. The committee, which included Sevier, submitted the "Watauga Petition" to Virginia in the spring of 1776, formally asking to be annexed, but Virginia refused. (Historian J. G. M. Ramsey suggested Sevier wrote the petition, but later historians reject this). The Wataugans then petitioned North Carolina.

Fearing an invasion by Dragging Canoe, who was receiving arms from the British, the Overmountain settlers built Fort Caswell (commonly called Fort Watauga) to guard the Watauga settlements, and Eaton's Station to guard the Holston settlements. Sevier had begun building Fort Lee to guard settlements in the Nolichucky Valley. After receiving word of an impending Cherokee invasion from Nancy Ward, the Nolichucky settlers fled to Fort Caswell, and Sevier soon followed.

The Cherokee attacks began in mid-July 1776. Dragging Canoe went north to attack the Holston settlements, while a detachment led by Old Abraham of Chilhowee invaded the Watauga settlements. On July 21, Old Abraham's forces reached Fort Caswell, which was garrisoned by 75 militia commanded by John Carter, with Sevier and James Robertson as subordinates. Catherine Sherrill, Sevier's future wife, failed to make it into the fort before the gate was locked, but Sevier managed to reach over the palisades and pull her to safety. The fort's garrison beat back the Cherokee assault, and after a two-week siege, Old Abraham retreated. The Cherokee eventually sued for peace following an invasion of the Overhill country by William Christian in October 1776.

The Wataugans sent five delegates, among them Sevier, to North Carolina's constitutional convention in November 1776. The new constitution created the "District of Washington," which included most of modern Tennessee. The new district elected Sevier to one of its two seats in the state's House of Representatives. The district became Washington County, North Carolina in 1777. Sevier was appointed lieutenant-colonel of the new county's Washington County Regiment of militia.

=== Battle of Kings Mountain ===
Following the British victory at the Battle of Camden in August 1780, an army of Loyalists under Major Patrick Ferguson was dispatched to suppress Patriot activity in the mountains. After routing a small force under Charles McDowell, Ferguson sent a message to the Overmountain settlements, warning them that if they refused to lay down their arms he would march over the mountains and "lay waste the country with fire and sword." Sevier and Sullivan County militia colonel Isaac Shelby agreed to raise armies and march across the mountains to engage Ferguson.

On September 25, 1780, the Overmountain Men, as they came to be called, gathered at Sycamore Shoals to prepare for the march. This force consisted of 240 Washington County militia commanded by Sevier, 240 Sullivan County militia commanded by Shelby, and 400 Virginians commanded by William Campbell. To provide funds for the march, Sevier obtained a loan from John Adair, putting up his own property as collateral. The combined force departed across the mountains on September 26, eventually linking up with the remnants of McDowell's men.

On October 7, the Overmountain Men caught up with and surrounded Ferguson, who had entrenched his Loyalist forces atop Kings Mountain, near the present-day North Carolina-South Carolina border. Sevier's men comprised part of the south flank, along with the forces of Campbell and McDowell. Patriot forces initially failed to break through the Loyalist lines, but the frontier sharpshooters gradually decimated the American Loyalist ranks. At the height of the battle, Sevier and Campbell charged the high point of the Loyalist position, giving the Overmountain men a foothold atop the mountain. Ferguson was killed while trying to break through Sevier's line, and the Loyalists surrendered shortly afterward. Sevier's brother, Captain Robert Sevier, was mortally wounded in the battle.

== Cherokee and Chickamauga wars ==
Upon returning from Kings Mountain, Sevier was told by Nancy Ward of an impending Cherokee attack. He organized a 300-man force and marched south. On December 16, 1780, he routed a Cherokee force at the Battle of Boyd's Creek, near modern Sevierville. A few days later, he was joined by a contingent of Virginia militia led by Arthur Campbell, and the combined forces continued south, occupying the Cherokee town of Chota on December 25. They captured and burned Cherokee towns of Chilhowee and Tallassee three days later. Sevier and Campbell proceeded as far as the Hiwassee River, where they burned the villages of Great Hiwassee and Chestoee, before beginning the march home on New Year's Day.

In February 1781, Sevier was commissioned as colonel-commandant of the Washington County militia, following the death of John Carter. Shortly afterward, he embarked on an expedition against the Cherokee Middle Towns, which lay on the other side of the mountains in the vicinity of modern Bryson City, North Carolina. Emerging from the mountains in March, his 150-man force took the village of Tuckasegee by surprise, killing about 50 and capturing several other Cherokee. Facing little opposition, he proceeded to destroy about 15 villages before returning home.

In September 1782, Sevier set out on an expedition against Dragging Canoe and his band of Cherokee, who had become concentrated in a string of villages in northern Georgia and Alabama. Because Dragging Canoe's band had earlier been settled near the Chickamauga River, settlers called them the "Chickamauga" Cherokee, but they were never a separate tribe. Sevier defeated a small force near Lookout Mountain, and destroyed several Cherokee villages along the Coosa River. Chief Oconostota helped negotiate peace between the newly founded America and the Cherokee people, bringing an end to the battles between the two nations.

== State of Franklin ==
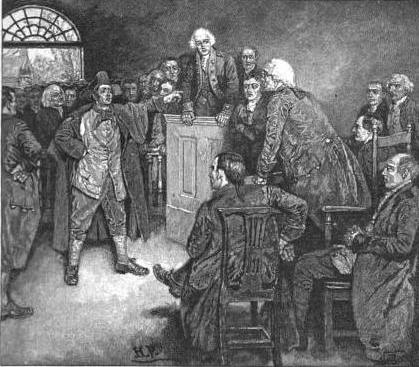
Howard Pyle drawing in an 1885 edition of Harper's Magazine, showing a romanticized account of Sevier's 1788 escape from North Carolina (he was never tried by the state)

In June 1784, North Carolina, bowing to pressure, from the Continental Congress and eager to be rid of an expensive and unprofitable district, ceded its lands west of the Appalachian Mountains to the federal government. However, Congress did not immediately accept the lands, creating a vacuum of power in what is now Tennessee. In August 1784, Sevier served as president of a convention held at Jonesborough with the aim of establishing a new state. In March of the following year, he was elected governor of the proposed state, which was named "Franklin" in honor of Benjamin Franklin.

In October 1784, North Carolina rescinded the cession and reasserted its claim to the Tennessee region. Sevier initially supported this, in part because he was offered a promotion to brigadier general, but he was persuaded by William Cocke to remain with the Franklinites. Though Sevier had popular support, a number of men from Washington County, led by John Tipton, remained loyal to North Carolina. As a result, two parallel governments were operating in Tennessee. Both elected public officials. Relations between the two governments were initially cordial, though a rivalry developed between Sevier and Tipton.

As North Carolina and Franklin competed for the loyalties of the residents of the area, Sevier became involved in intrigues with Georgia to gain control of Cherokee lands in what is now northern Alabama. He had taken out claims on several thousand acres of land. He also considered an alliance with Spain, whose Governor Esteban Rodríguez Miró tried to sway Sevier, but the American eventually abandoned that idea.

In June 1785, Sevier negotiated the Treaty of Dumplin Creek, in which the Cherokee gave up claims to lands south of the French Broad River as far as the Little River–Little Tennessee River divide. The following year, he negotiated the Treaty of Coyatee, which extended the boundary to the Little Tennessee River. The State of Franklin created three new counties (modern Cocke, Sevier, and Blount counties). The United States Senate never ratified these treaties, however, as required to make them legal between a tribe and the government. The fate of the European-American settlers who moved into these areas remained in limbo for years.

In February 1788, the rivalry between Sevier and Tipton came to a head, in what became known as the "Battle of Franklin." While Sevier was campaigning against the Cherokee, Tipton ordered some of Sevier's slaves to be seized for taxes supposedly owed to North Carolina. In response, Sevier led 150 militia to Tipton's farm, which was defended by about 45 loyalists supporting North Carolina. Both sides demanded the other surrender, and briefly exchanged gunfire. On February 29, two days after the siege began, loyalist reinforcements from Sullivan County arrived on the scene and scattered the Franklinites. Sevier retreated, though not before two men were killed. Two of Sevier's sons and other Franklin supporters were captured, but all were subsequently released.

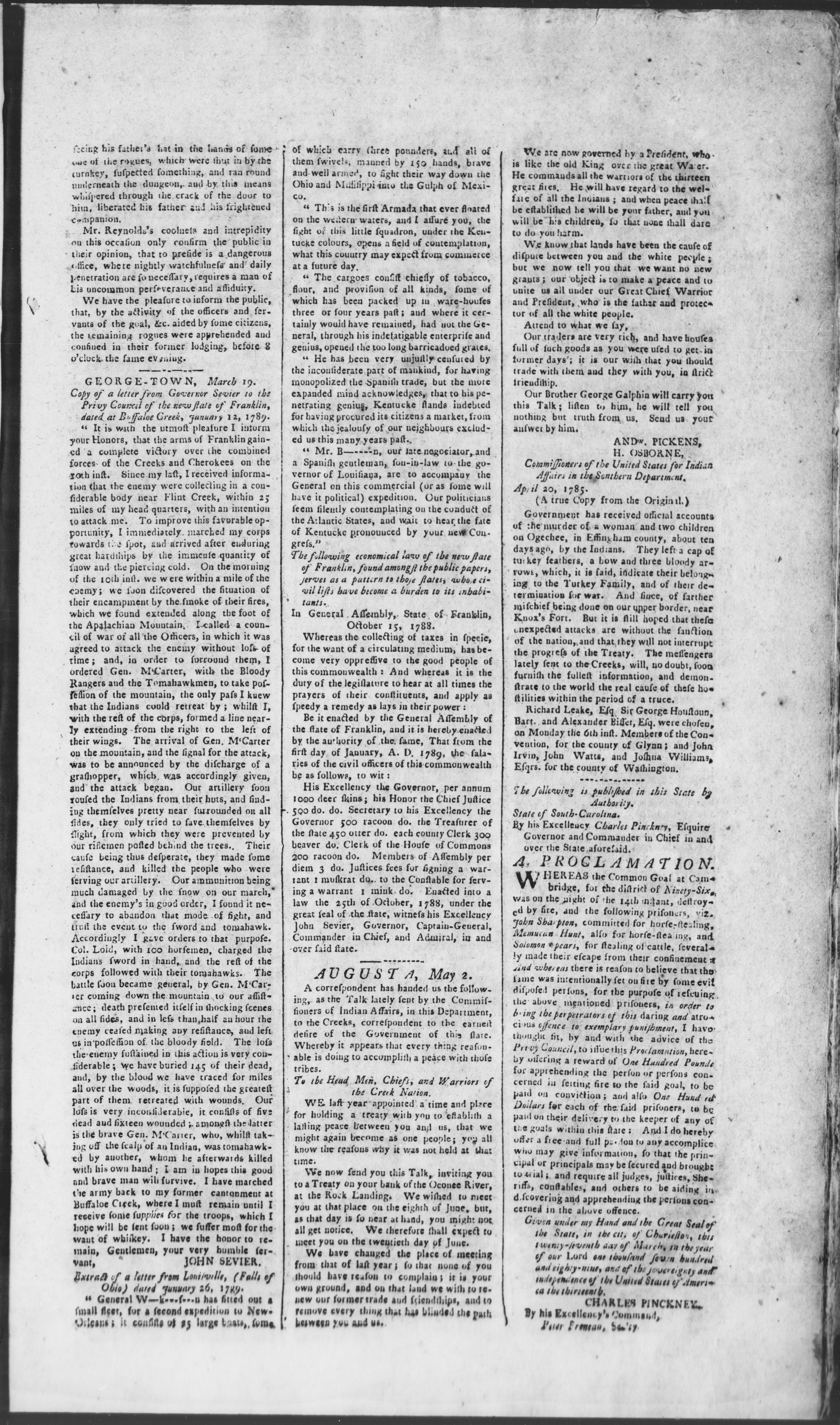
Newspaper page printing John Sevier’s January 12, 1789 report of the Battle of Flint Creek (published May 2, 1789).

In the summer of 1788, several Kirke family settlers were killed by renegade Cherokee warriors, in Blount County, in what became known by European Americans as the "Nine Mile Creek Massacre". In response, Sevier invaded and destroyed several Cherokee towns in the Little Tennessee Valley. Several Cherokee leaders met with Sevier under a flag of truce to discuss peace. But John Kirke, a member of the murdered family, attacked the delegation and killed several chiefs, including Old Tassel and Old Abraham of Chilhowee. The Cherokee were enraged, resulting in new supporters for Dragging Canoe in his resistance to the European Americans.

Following the Battle of Franklin, support for Sevier and the State of Franklin collapsed among settlers in areas north of the French Broad River. North Carolina Governor Samuel Johnston issued a warrant for his arrest in July 1788. In October, after Sevier attacked David Deaderick, a Jonesborough store owner, for refusing to sell him liquor, Tipton and his men captured the leader. He was sent to Morganton, North Carolina, to stand trial for treason. He was released by Burke County Sheriff William Morrison (a Kings Mountain veteran), before the trial began.

In January 1789, Sevier defeated a large Cherokee invasion led by John Watts at the Battle of Flint Creek near Erwin.

== Southwest Territory ==
In February 1789, Sevier took the oath of allegiance to North Carolina. He was pardoned by North Carolina Governor Alexander Martin and elected to the North Carolina State Senate. When the senate convened the Fayetteville Convention in November 1789, Sevier was a delegate from Greene County and worked to gain the North Carolina's ratification of the U.S. Constitution. After it was ratified on November 23, Sevier helped engineer a second cession act, which passed with little opposition in December. This transferred the territory from North Carolina, of what is now the state of Tennessee, to the federal government.

To administer the new cession, Congress created the Southwest Territory in the spring of 1790; it was administered under the Northwest Ordinance. Sevier was appointed brigadier general of the territorial militia. William Blount, a fellow land speculator and North Carolina politician, was appointed governor of the territory. In June 1791, Blount negotiated the Treaty of Holston, which resolved the land disputes with the Cherokee created by the Treaty of Dumplin Creek.

Just before the cession, the territory was designated as North Carolina's 5th congressional district. Sevier was elected to represent it in the first Congress. By the time he arrived in New York City, where the new government was temporarily situated, the cession of Tennessee had taken place. Sevier was permitted to serve out his term although he no longer represented an existing North Carolina district.

In the fall of 1793, following a Cherokee attack on Cavett's Station west of Knoxville, Sevier led the territorial militia south into Georgia to their base territory. He defeated a Cherokee force at the Battle of Hightower and destroyed several villages. The following year, President George Washington appointed Sevier to the Southwest Territory council, a body that operated similar to that of a state senate. That same year, he was appointed to the first board of trustees of Blount College, the forerunner of the University of Tennessee.

== Governor of Tennessee ==
In 1796, the Southwest Territory was admitted to the Union as the State of Tennessee. Sevier missed the state's constitutional convention while serving on the territorial council in Washington, but he was elected the new state's first governor. Sevier made the acquisition of Indian lands a priority. He consistently urged Congress and the Secretary of War (then responsible for relations with Native American tribes) to negotiate new treaties to that end, to extinguish Indian land claims and promote European-American settlement.

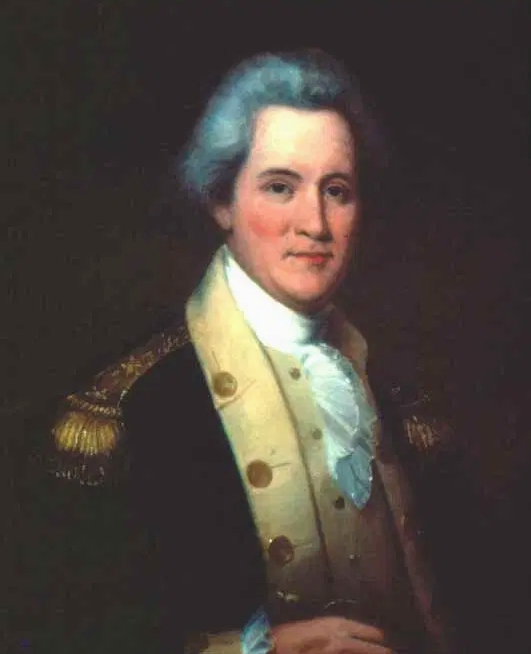
Portrait of Sevier by Washington B. Cooper

During his first term as governor, Sevier developed a rivalry with rising politician Andrew Jackson. In 1796, Jackson campaigned for the position of major-general of the state militia but Sevier threw his support behind George Conway. Jackson learned that Sevier had referred to him as a "poor pitiful petty fogging lawyer" in private correspondence. In 1797, Jackson, then serving as a U.S. Senator, learned that fraud had taken place in the 1780s at what was then North Carolina's Nashville land office. He notified the governor of North Carolina. When the governor demanded the office's documents, Sevier blocked their transfer. Jackson concluded that Sevier was somehow involved in the scandal.

Sevier was a Freemason, and, while in office as governor, he helped establish the first Masonic lodge in East Tennessee. Tennessee Lodge #2 in Knoxville received its charter from the Grand Lodge of North Carolina on November 30, 1800, and John Sevier was its first Worshipful Master. Tennessee Lodge was the second Masonic lodge within the state of Tennessee, the first being St. Tammany Lodge #1, chartered in Nashville in 1796.

After Sevier's third (two-year) term as governor, term limits prevented him from seeking a fourth consecutive term. Archibald Roane was elected as his replacement. Both Sevier and Jackson campaigned for major-general of the militia: the vote ended in a tie, and Roane chose Jackson. When Sevier announced his candidacy for governor in 1803, Roane and Jackson publicized documents acquired from the Nashville land office scandal and accused Sevier of bribery. Their efforts to smear Sevier were unsuccessful, however, and the popular Sevier easily defeated Roane in the election.

Following his inauguration, Sevier encountered Jackson in Knoxville. They had an argument during which Sevier accused Jackson of adultery in his marriage to Rachel Donelson. An enraged Jackson challenged Sevier to a duel, which he accepted. The duel was to take place at Southwest Point, but Sevier's wagon stalled at Campbell's Station en route to the duel. As Jackson returned to Knoxville, he encountered Sevier's entourage. The two men loudly exchanged insults, and Sevier's horse ran away, carrying his pistols. Jackson pointed his pistol at Sevier, who hid behind a tree. Sevier's son pointed his pistol at Jackson, and Jackson's second pointed his pistol at Sevier's son. Members of both parties managed to resolve the incident before bloodshed took place.

In 1804, Sevier helped William C. C. Claiborne get appointed governor of the newly acquired Louisiana Territory, a position which Jackson had sought. Jackson supported Roane in the state's gubernatorial election in 1805, but Sevier won with nearly two-thirds of the vote. Sevier's last campaign for governor was in 1807, when he defeated William Cocke.

== Later life ==
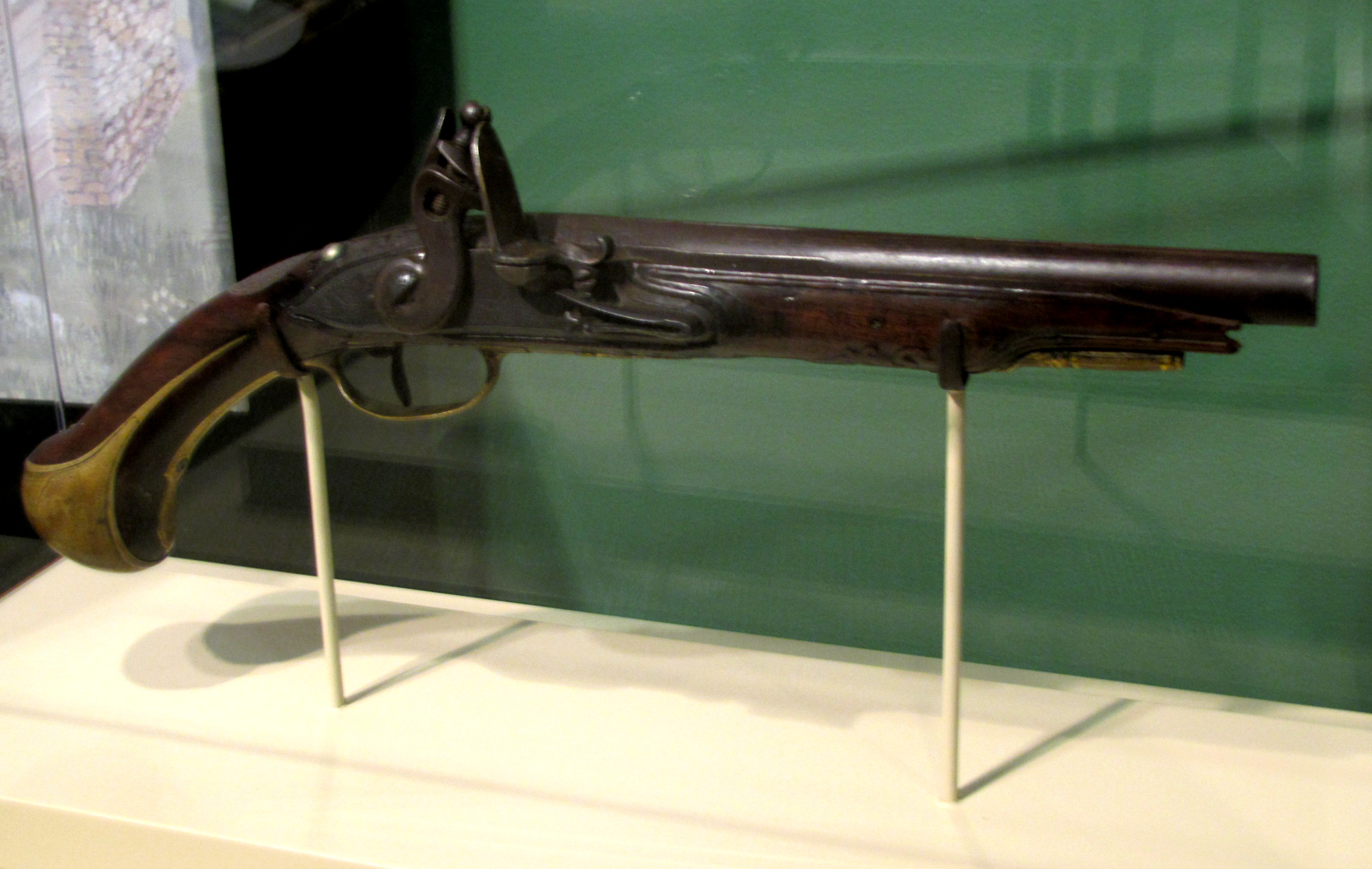
Sevier's pistol on display at the East Tennessee History Center in Knoxville

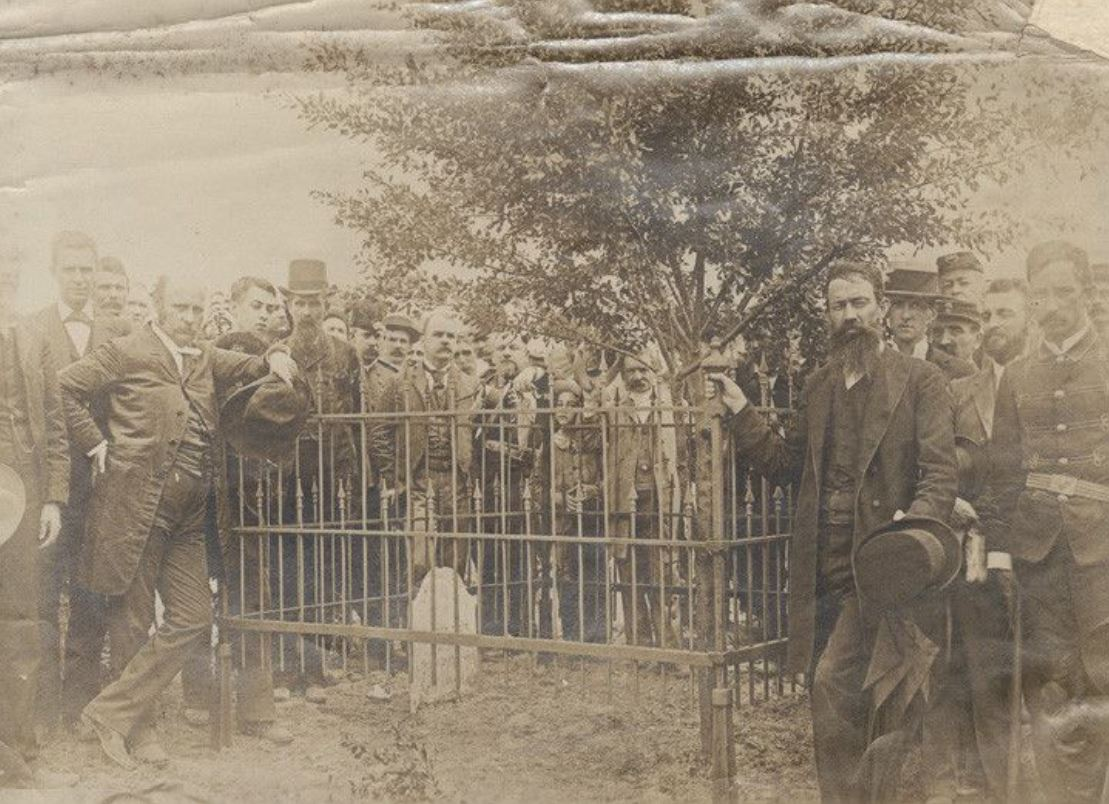
1889 photograph of Sevier's original grave at Fort Decatur, with Governor Taylor located on left corner of fence and Alabama governor Thomas Seay located on right corner of fence

Barred by term limits from a fourth consecutive term as governor, Sevier sought support in 1809 from the state legislature for one of the state's U.S. Senate seats, but the legislature chose Joseph Anderson. (Popular election of senators did not happen until after a constitutional amendment in the early 20th century.) Sevier ran for the Knox County seat in the Tennessee State Senate, winning easily. In 1811, Sevier was elected to the U.S. Congress for the state's 2nd district. Sevier was a strong supporter of the War of 1812. President James Madison offered him a command in the army, but Sevier turned it down.

According to the early Tennessee historian Dr. J.G.M. Ramsey, Sevier attended the Lebanon In The Fork Presbyterian Church east of Knoxville with members of his family, but he was not a formal member of the church. He never served as an elder. "His last wife was a member," wrote Ramsey, "but he was Gullis-like and cared for none of these things."

In 1815, Sevier died in the Alabama Territory while conducting a survey of lands which Jackson had recently acquired from the Creek tribe (Muscogee) through the Treaty of Fort Jackson. He was buried along the Tallapoosa River near Fort Decatur.

In 1889, at the request of Governor Robert Love Taylor, Sevier's remains were re-interred in the Knox County Courthouse lawn in Knoxville. A monument was placed on the grave in 1893, in a ceremony that included a speech by historian Oliver Perry Temple. In 1922, the remains of his second wife, Catherine Sherill, were re-interred next to Sevier's. A monument recognizing his first wife, Sarah Hawkins, was placed at the site in 1946.

Her original gravestone (placed a time after her death) incorrectly lists 1744 as her birth year, probably due to: 1) Carver's error 2) Family or document confusion at the time 3) Use of different calendars (some colonial dates were recorded according to the Julian calendar). When it was moved in 1889 from Alabama to Knoxville, Tennessee, it was decided to preserve the original inscription, even with the error.

== Legacy ==
In his book, The Lost State of Franklin, Kevin Barksdale says that Sevier was driven, at least in part, by a desire to acquire his own land claims in the trans-Appalachian region. For many East Tennesseans, he represented "rugged individualism, regional exceptionalism, and civic dignity." For nearly a century after his death, historians such as Ramsey and Oliver Perry Temple heaped unconditional praise upon Sevier and romanticized various events in his life. Later authors, such as Theodore Roosevelt (Winning of the West) and Samuel Cole Williams (History of the Lost State of Franklin), added a more objective perspective to accounts of this period.

Several historians argue that the rivalry between John Sevier and Andrew Jackson was the root of the factionalism that divided East Tennessee and the rest of the state in subsequent decades. But the sections were also divided by their geography, land characteristics, and settlement patterns. East Tennessee was dominated by yeoman farmers who generally owned few slaves. Middle Tennessee had numerous planters and slaveowners, who cultivated commodity crops such as tobacco and hemp based on the labor of enslaved African Americans. West Tennessee, along the lowlands of the Mississippi River, became dominated by large cotton plantations and planters who held numerous slaves. East Tennessee voters gradually developed support for the Whig Party in the 1830s, and most were Unionists during the Civil War. Following the war, majority-white East Tennessee remained one of the South's few predominantly white Republican regions into the early 20th century.

=== Monuments and memorials ===
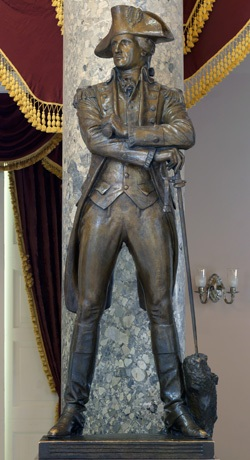
Statue of Sevier in the National Statuary Hall Collection

In the 1770s, Sevier established a plantation, Mount Pleasant, along the Nolichucky River south of Jonesborough. This site inspired his nickname, "Nolichucky Jack." He moved to Knoxville in 1797, where he began construction of what later became the James Park House.

He completed only the foundation, however, before relocating to Marble Springs, a plantation he owned in South Knoxville. A log cabin still standing at this site has been attributed to Sevier. But a dendrochronological analysis of the cabin's logs, conducted by the University of Tennessee, suggests the cabin was built well after his death. Marble Springs has been designated as a state historic site associated with Sevier and is listed on the National Register of Historic Places.

Numerous municipal and civic entities are named in honor of Sevier. These include Sevier County, Tennessee, and its county seat, Sevierville; Governor John Sevier Highway in South Knoxville; John Sevier Middle School in Kingsport; and John Sevier Elementary School in Maryville. Other entities named for him include a coal-fired power plant operated by the Tennessee Valley Authority near Rogersville, a railroad classification yard operated by Norfolk Southern in east Knox County, and a dormitory at Austin Peay State University in Clarksville.

The Knoxville-based Bonny Kate Chapter of the Daughters of the American Revolution is named for Sevier's wife, Catherine Sherrill. The later Bonny Kate Elementary in South Knoxville was also named for her. The John Sevier-Sarah Hawkins chapter of the Daughters of the American Revolution in Johnson City is also named in honor of Sevier and his first wife.

In 1931, a statue of Sevier, created by Leopold and Belle Kinney Scholz, was dedicated at the National Statuary Hall Collection of the U. S. Capitol. Other monuments include a bust on the first floor of the Tennessee State Capitol, and Daughters of American Revolution monuments at Marble Springs in Knoxville and at Myrtle Hill Cemetery in Rome, Georgia. A monument to Sevier's father, Valentine Sevier ("the immigrant ancestor," as distinguished from John's brother, also named Valentine), has been placed at Sycamore Shoals State Historic Park in Elizabethton.

Tennessee's first office building built specifically for state government offices is the John Sevier State Office Building. The six-story building opened in 1940 adjacent to the State Capital Building in downtown Nashville.

== Family ==
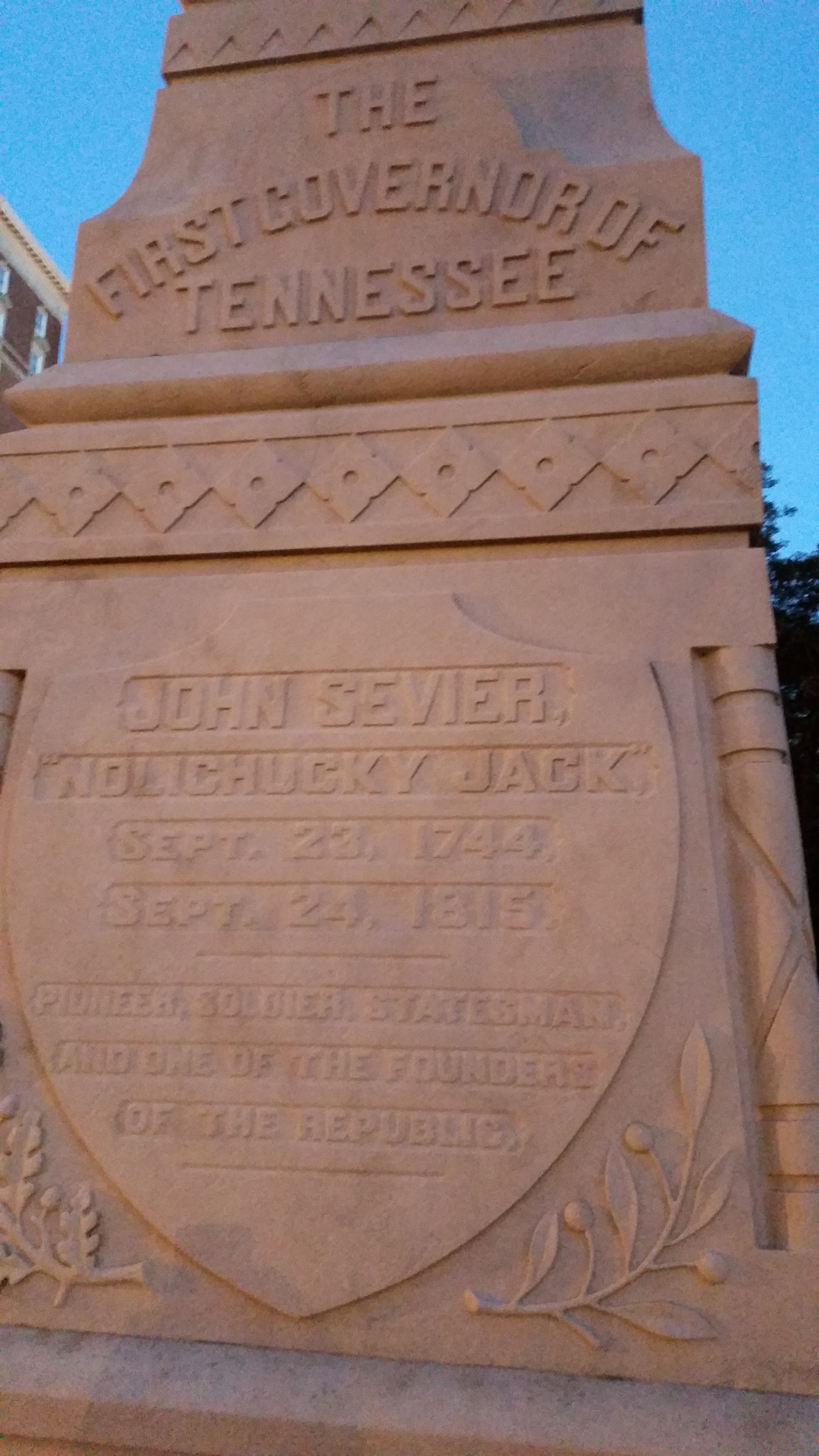
Grave marker of John Sevier, Knoxville, Tennessee

A marker exists on the current grave of John Sevier on the lawn of the Old Knox County Courthouse. This marker claims his birth date was September 23, 1744, in contradiction to most sources that claim his birth year of 1745.

One area of dispute seems to be whether John Sevier’s ancestry can be traced back to intersect with the ancestry of St.Francis Xavier. Several facts seem to be in agreement with both family lines. Both John Sevier’s ancestry and the ancestry of St. Francis can be traced back to the Kingdom of Navarre. Both families were dispersed by the Edict of Nantes and its later revocation. While a number of sources agree that there is a connection, others firmly dispute that assertion.

John Sevier married Sarah Hawkins (1746–1780) in 1761. They had ten children: Joseph, James, John, Elizabeth, Sarah, Mary Ann, Valentine (namesake of the paternal grandfather), Rebecca, Richard, and Nancy. Following Sarah's death, Sevier married Catherine Sherrill (1754–1836). They had eight children together: Catherine, Ruthe, George Washington, Samuel, Polly, Eliza, Joanna, and Robert.

Sevier's descendants followed other migrants south and west. His grandnephew, Ambrose Hundley Sevier, served as one of the first U.S. senators from Arkansas. Sevier County, Arkansas, is named for him. The Conway family, which dominated early Arkansas state politics, were cousins of the Seviers. Henry Conway was a friend of John Sevier, and served as Treasurer of the State of Franklin. Two of Sevier's sons, James and John, married Conway's daughters, Nancy and Elizabeth, respectively. Henry Conway was the grandfather of Ambrose Sevier and James Sevier Conway, who was Arkansas's first governor.

== See also ==
- Daniel Boone
- David Crockett
- Joseph Hardin, Sr.
- List of members of the United States Congress who died in office (1790–1899)

U.S. House of Representatives
New district	Member of the U.S. House of Representatives from North Carolina's 5th congressional district 1790–1791	Succeeded by Nathaniel Macon
Preceded by Robert Weakley	Member of the U.S. House of Representatives from Tennessee's 2nd congressional district 1811–1815	Succeeded by Bennett H. Henderson
Political offices
New office	Governor of Franklin; 1784–1788	Office abolished
New office	Governor of Tennessee; 1796–1801	Succeeded by Archibald Roane
Preceded by Archibald Roane	Governor of Tennessee; 1803–1809	Succeeded by Willie Blount
