= Joseph Hardin Sr. =

Revolutionary War militia officer and politician

Joseph Hardin
- Born: April 18, 1734; Henrico County, Colony of Virginia
- Died: July 4, 1801 (aged 67); Hardin Valley, Knox County, Tennessee
- Relatives: Jane Gibson, wife
- Military career
- Allegiance: United States
- Branch: North Carolina Militia
- Units: American Revolutionary War; Salisbury District Minutemen (1775-1776); Wilkes County Regiment (1779-1783); Tryon County Regiment (North Carolina) (1776-1779); 2nd Battalion of Volunteers (1776-1777); Greene County Regiment (1783)
- Commands: Cavalry Captain; North Carolina Light Horse, 1776; Colonel; Greene County Regiment (1783); NC Militia for the 'Western Counties'; State of Franklin 1784–88
- Conflicts: Revolutionary War Southern campaign; Battle of Ramseur's Mill; Battle of Kings Mountain
- Other work: Political; Assemblyman and Provincial Congressman, Province of North Carolina; Co-founder and Speaker of the House, State of Franklin; Speaker, Southwest Territory; Philanthropy; Trustee of Greeneville College; Civic: Justice of the Peace; Hardin County, TN named for him

Joseph Hardin Sr. (April 18, 1734 – July 4, 1801) was an Assemblyman (in the Provincial Congress) for the Province of North Carolina, and was a signatory of the Tryon Resolves. Early in the War for Independence, as a member of the militia from Tryon County, Hardin fought the Cherokee allies of Britain along the western frontier. Later in the war, having taken his family over the Appalachian Mountains to the Washington District for safety against the advance of the British soldiers out of South Carolina, Hardin joined the Overmountain Men. He saw action at the Battle of Ramsour's Mill and the decisive Battle of Kings Mountain. Following the peace with Britain, Hardin was a co-founder and second Speaker of the House for the State of Franklin; and an Assemblyman in the Southwest Territory before its statehood as Tennessee.

== Early and family life ==
Joseph Hardin was born the spring of 1734 in Henrico Co., Virginia Colony in an area several years later to be encompassed by the fledgling town of Richmond at the Falls (now Richmond), Virginia Colony.

Hardin was the second son, and fourth child, of Benjamin Hardin II and Margaret Hooper. He was older brother to Captain John Hardin (1736–1802) (noted as the hero who turned the tide of battle for the patriots at the Battle of Ramsour's Mill during the "Southern Campaign" of the Revolutionary War) and Sarah Hardin, wife to Lt. Col. Frederick Hambright.

Hardin married Jane Gibson (1742–1817) on July 8, 1762, in Virginia. They moved to the 'Salisbury District' of the province of North Carolina, settling in the newly formed Tryon County, where he became Justice of the Peace in 1772.

Hardin's children were: Rebecca; twins Joseph Jr. and John; Jane Ann; James W.; Benjamin I; Robert I; Elender; Mary Easter; Margaret; Amos; Benjamin II; Gibson; and Robert II. "Ben-two" and "Robert-two", as they were called, were both named after older brothers who had been lost in battle with Native Americans.

Hardin was a great-grandfather of Texas outlaw, John Wesley Hardin.

== Civil service ==
Hardin served several stints as a local Justice of the Peace: first in Tryon County, NC (April 1772 – 1778); then Washington Co., NC (Tennessee East District) (1783); and finally Greene Co. (1796). He served for Tryon County as a delegate to the North Carolina Provincial Congress in 1776 and representative to the North Carolina House of Commons in 1778. He also served for Washington County (Washington District, North Carolina) (1782) and, Greene Co., Tennessee East District, NC (1788). Hardin was a signer of the Tryon Resolves in September 1775.

During the period of 1784–1785, Hardin, John Sevier, and several others were instrumental in organizing the extra-legal State of Franklin. He was elected its second Speaker of the House in June 1785. A few years after the failure of Franklin, he served as a representative for the First Territorial Assembly of the Southwest Territory (also known as the Territory South of the Ohio River) held at Knoxville, Tennessee, in the summer of 1794. Later that same year, Hardin became a trustee of the newly chartered Greeneville (later Tusculum) College. He was elevated to Speaker of the House in the territorial assembly in 1795.

JOSEPH HARDIN

FARMER-SOLDIER-STATESMAN

Born April 18, 1734 in Virginia of English Ancestry.
Died July 4, 1801, in Hardin Valley, Tennessee.
A strict Presbyterian, stern and fearless in discharge of duty.
Loved and trusted by his friends, feared by his enemies.

PIONEER-PATRIOT-PATRIARCH

Major 2nd N.C. Minute Men, Salisbury District, 1775.
Captain Tryon Co., N.C. Light Horse, Cherokee Expedition, 1776.
In battle of Ramsour's Mill and at Kings Mountain, 1780.
Colonel for Western Counties (Tenn.), 1788.
Lost three sons in Tennessee Indian Wars.

Member Committee of Safety, Tryon Co., N.C., 1775.
Member Provincial Congress at Hillsborough 1775 and at Halifax 1776.
Member General Assembly of N.C., 1778-79 and (from Tenn.) 1782-88.
Organizer State of Franklin, Jonesboro, 1784-1785.
Member General Assembly, Territory South of the Ohio, Knoxville, 1794.

For his military services during Revolutionary War and Indian Wars he received in 1785 from North Carolina,
3000 acres of land in the middle district, now Hardin County, Tenn. named for him.

—Burial Memorial, Knoxville, Tennessee

== Military service ==
American Revolution service record:

- Major in the Salisbury District Minutemen, part of the North Carolina State Troops (1775–1776)
- Captain in the Tryon County Regiment (North Carolina) of the North Carolina militia (1776–1779)
- Captain in the 2nd Battalion of Volunteers (1776–1777)
- Major in the Wilkes County Regiment of the North Carolina militia (1779–1783), initially under the Salisbury District Brigade but moved to the newly created Morgan District Brigade in 1782
- Colonel over the Greene County Regiment of the North Carolina militia under the Morgan District Brigade (1783)

Hardin's first documented military service shows his appointment as the first major of the 2nd North Carolina Minutemen Brigade (from the Salisbury District) in 1775. That same year, he appears in the rolls as a captain in the Griffith Rutherford's Light Horse Rangers. Hardin took part in Rutherford's Cherokee Expedition into the Washington District late the following year, under Captain William Moore. Beginning in 1777, Hardin carried a captain's commission in Locke's 2nd Battalion of Volunteers (part of General Allen Jones' Halifax District Brigade) seeing action against Britain and its Native American allies.

It was during this time that Hardin moved his family to the western settlements for safe keeping. As a major in the North Carolina militia, he raised a battalion of volunteers, the Wilkes County Regiment, in early 1779. As an officer in this Overmountain Men militia, he fought in the Battle of Ramseur's Mill, between the Tories (Loyalists to the Crown) and the Whigs (American Patriots) on June 20, 1780, and later that year at the Battle of Kings Mountain, on Oct 7.

After the cessation of the ground war with Britain (1783), Hardin, then living in the newly established Greene County, was promoted to colonel and appointed Commandant of the North Carolina Militia for "The Western Counties" (old Washington District) due to the continuing hostilities with the Chickamauga.

=== Land grants ===
As was the custom of the time, he was awarded land grants totaling 8,400 acres (34 km^{2}) for service to his country. In 1786, several thousand acres of this land was set aside for Col. Hardin in what later became Hardin County, Tennessee.

== Later life and legacy ==
Tombstone Inscription of
HARDIN, Joseph
16 Apr 1734
4 Jul 1801
b. in Virginia;
d. in Hardin Valley
Served Rev. War

Although he himself never set foot in that region, on March 11, 1786, the land along the far western reaches of the Tennessee River was surveyed by Isaac Taylor and warrants were drawn on behalf of Hardin for 3,000 acres (12 km^{2}) in what was to become Hardin County, Tennessee However, due to legal trouble with squatters and the wildness of that area in Tennessee, it was thirty years before his family could settle there.

Hardin died July 4, 1801. He is interred at the Hickory Creek Cemetery, Hardin Valley, Knox Co., TN. There is a large monument dedicated to Hardin at the site. The inscription reads:

=== The Hardin Expedition ===
The dedication plaque for the Savannah, Hardin Co., TN courthouse which is dedicated to Col. Joseph Hardin

Two parties of settlers (totaling 26) struck out of Knoxville, Tennessee, in late spring of 1816 bound for the general area which would eventually become Savannah, Tennessee. The first party came by boat down the Tennessee River, landing in May at "the easteward curve of the Tennessee" at Cerro Gordo. The second, and larger, party had travelled overland and suffered from many delays. Upon the arrival of the second group, the parties finally rejoined at Johnson Creek, near present-day Savannah, Tennessee. It was now July, and the pioneers set about the laying down of the first permanent settlement by non-Native Americans in the area.

This second party was led by Joseph Hardin Jr., son of Col. Joseph Hardin, who had, before his death, accumulated several land grants to the area as rewards for his Revolutionary War service. Joseph Jr. was accompanied on the trip by his brother, James Hardin (known as the founder of the settlement of Hardinville; a failed endeavor that would be created in 1817 on nearby Hardin's Creek). Both men executed land grants in the area. They had fought alongside their father in the war and had been likewise rewarded with their own land patents, and had inherited some of their father's remaining unclaimed grants. About this same time, other settlers from the initial expedition established a community further down river at Saltillo.

Other relatives of Col. Joseph's were to eventually settle in the area, including sons: Gibson, Ben II and Robert II, and daughter, Margaret (wife of Ninian Steele), all having arrived there by 1818.

The county was named posthumously for Joseph Hardin Sr. in November 1819, at the first meeting of the county assembly which took place at the home of his son, James Hardin. Today, the courthouse in the county seat of Savannah is dedicated to him.

== See also ==
- List of North Carolina militia units in the American Revolution
