= James Johnston (colonel) =

Scottish-American soldier and politician (c.1742-1805)

- Born: c. 1742; Scotland, Kingdom of Great Britain
- Died: July 23, 1805; Lincoln County, North Carolina, United States
- Burial place: Oak Grove Farm, Lincoln County (now Gaston County), North Carolina
- Spouse: Jane Ewart
- Children: State Senator Robert Johnston, Sarah Johnston
- Military career
- Allegiance: United States of America
- Branch: North Carolina militia
- Service years: 1775–1783
- Rank: Captain, Major, Colonel
- Units: Tryon County Regiment, Lincoln County Regiment
- Other work: state senator, delegate to North Carolina Constitutional Convention, politician

James Johnston (c. 1742 – July 23, 1805) was an officer in the Tryon County Regiment and Lincoln County Regiments of the North Carolina militia in the American Revolution, a delegate to the North Carolina Provincial Congress in 1776, and a state senator in 1780–1782.

== Early life ==
Johnston was born in Scotland about 1742. He was the son of Henry Johnston. He was married to Jane Ewart, the daughter of Robert Ewart. Before the Revolution, he purchased a large tract of land on the Catawba River in Tryon County, North Carolina. He built a home, called Oak Grove, there in 1782. A North Carolina highway marker shows the location where his home stood, which is now near Lucia in Gaston County, North Carolina.

== Military service ==
James Johnston was a Captain in the Tryon County Regiment (1775-1779) and Lincoln County Regiment (1779-1780) in the North Carolina militia. James first entered the service of his country, as a company captain in 1775 under Colonel William Graham. (Note: The Tryon County Regiment was disbanded on February 8, 1779, and split into the Lincoln County Regiment and Rutherford County Regiment. He was in many notable battles, including the Battle of Great Cane Brake in South Carolina on December 22, 1775, the Snow Campaign in South Carolina from December 23 to 30, 1775, the Cherokee Expedition in western North Carolina from August to November 1776, and the Battle of Kings Mountain in South Carolina on October 7, 1780. In the battle of Kings Mountain, he led the rear guard, as one of ten captains. This rear guard consisted of about 90 men, under his command. He was called into the battle within the first 20 minutes. He and his fellow captains had a complete victory over the British and Tory forces. His militia units became part of the Salisbury District Brigade on May 4, 1776.

A 1877 publication by Hunter reports that James Johnston was promoted to colonel in the North Carolina militia. He was an aide to General Griffith Rutherford and commanded a reserve unit at the Battle of Ramseur's Mill.

== Political career and home ==
He was chosen as a delegate to the North Carolina Provincial Congress, which met on 4 April in 1776 in Halifax. He was a fellow delegate with Colonel Charles McLean, who also served in the Lincoln County Regiment.

He was also a state senator from Lincoln County between 1780 and 1782 and reportedly acted as a disbursing agent for the Western Division of the army. He was also a representative at the Convention of 1788.

He was a respected elder of his church==probably the Goshen Presbyterian Church, which was the oldest in the area where he lived.

He died on July 23, 1805, in Lincoln County, North Carolina. He was buried on his farm at Oak Grove.
