= Shiloh Presbyterian Church Cemetery =

Historic cemetery in North Carolina, United States

- U.S. National Register of Historic Places
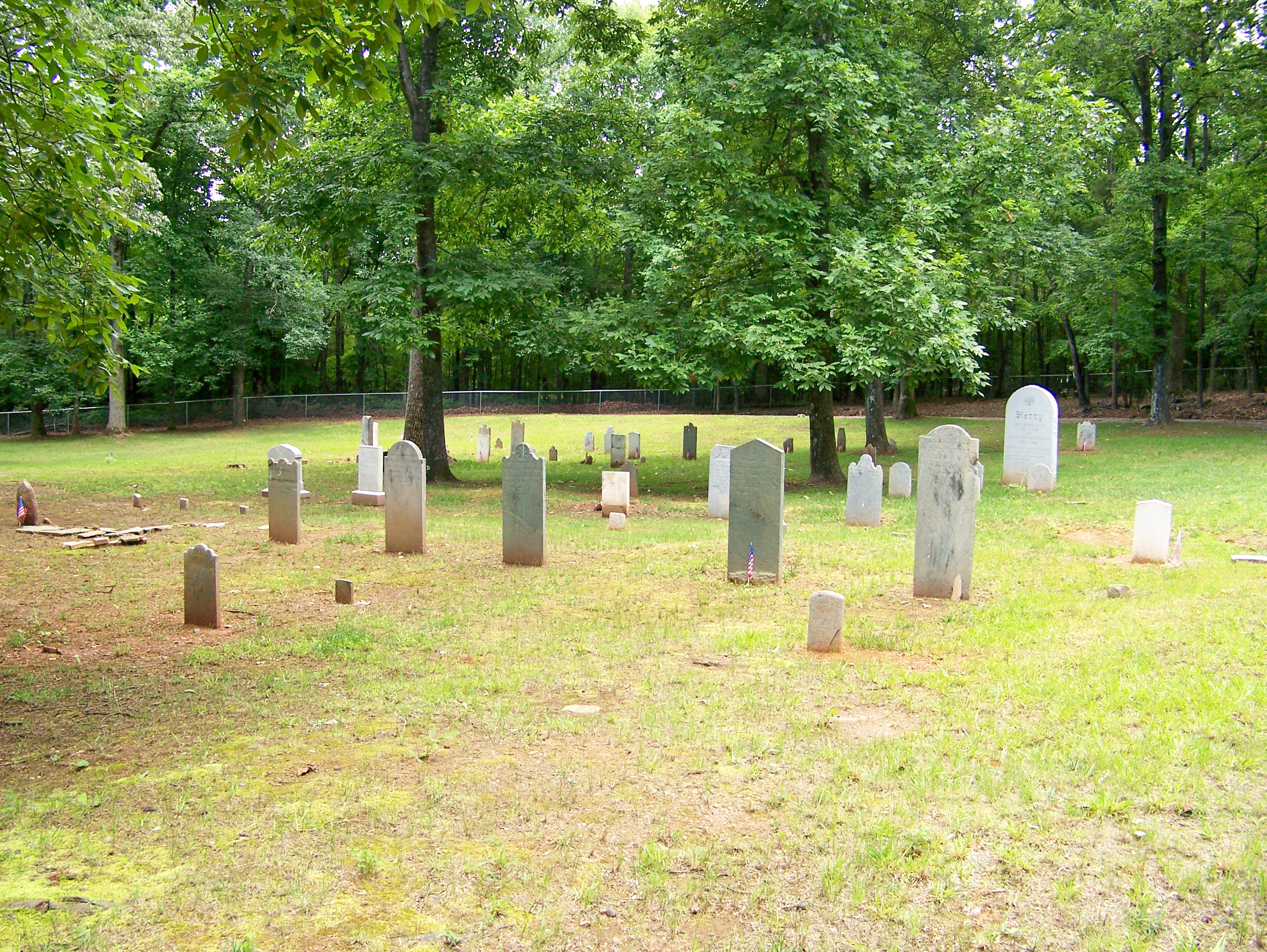

- Location within South Carolina Location within the United States
- Location: Elm St., 0.9 miles (1.4 km) south of U.S. Route 29, near Grover
- Coordinates: 35°10′09″N 81°25′57″W
- Area: 1.8 acres (0.73 ha)
- Built: 1780
- NRHP reference No.: 11000954
- Added to NRHP: December 22, 2011

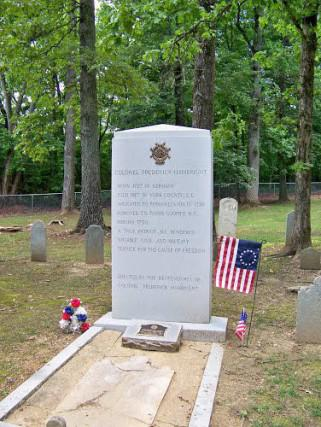
Colonel Frederick Hambright Grave

Shiloh Presbyterian Church Cemetery is a historic Presbyterian cemetery located near Grover, in Cleveland County, North Carolina and Cherokee County, South Carolina. It was established in 1780 in conjunction with the construction of the Shiloh Meeting House. Revolutionary War hero William Patterson, died on October 5, 1780, the day of the Battle of Kings Mountain, and was the first person interred at the cemetery. The cemetery is the oldest burying ground in the southeast section of Cleveland County, North Carolina. It includes a number of notable gravestones carved from greenish schist and soapstone dating from the 1780s to the 1820s. The cemetery includes 104 gravestones in the North Carolina section of the property, and four gravestones in the South Carolina section.

It was listed on the National Register of Historic Places in 2011.
