= Frederick Hambright =

Revolutionary War Officer (1727–1817)

- Frederick Hambright gravesite in Grover, North Carolina.
- Born: 1727 n.s. Moosbach, Bavaria, Holy Roman Empire
- Died: March 9, 1817 (aged 90); York County, South Carolina, United States
- Relatives: Spouse(s): 1. Sarah Hardin; 2. Mary Dover
- Military career
- Allegiance: United States
- Branch: Army
- Service years: 1777–1780
- Rank: Lieutenant Colonel
- Units: North Carolina militia: Tryon County Militia; Lincoln County Regiment (South Fork Boys)
- Commands: Graham's Regiment of the Tryon County Militia
- Conflicts: American Revolutionary War: Battle of Kings Mountain

Frederick Hambright (May 1, 1727, n.s.– March 9, 1817) was a military officer who fought in both the local militia and in the North Carolina Line of the Continental Army during the Revolutionary War. He is best known for his participation in the Battle of Kings Mountain in 1780. Serving as a statesman early in the Revolution, Hambright joined the war in 1777, ranked a lieutenant colonel in a local militia. His early actions were limited to occasional checks on (and some minor skirmishes with) Loyalist groups. This changed in 1780 with Hambright's important role at the Battle of Kings Mountain, which occurred near his lands in the newly formed Lincoln County, North Carolina. Hambright was commended for his bravery during the battle, though suffering a wound which forced him to permanently resign from military service.

A native of the Duchy of Bavaria, Hambright immigrated to Lancaster County, Pennsylvania, in 1738. Between 1755 and 1775, he moved several times, first to Virginia, and then to various areas in North Carolina. After the war, he lived the remainder of his life near Kings Mountain.

== Early life ==
Frederick Hambright was born to Conrad Hambrecht on May 1, 1727, in Moosbach, Electorate of Bavaria, Holy Roman Empire. He lived there for the first eleven years of his life, until the family immigrated to the Pennsylvania Colony on October 27, 1738, initially settling in Lancaster County. At the age of eighteen, Hambright left his father's home for Henrico County, Virginia. There he married his first wife, Sarah Hardin, sister of Colonel Joseph Hardin, who bore him 12 children, six of whom were raised to maturity.

Along with several neighbors, Hambright again emigrated, in 1760, to rural Mecklenburg County, North Carolina (in the area which was to become Tryon County in 1768), settling near the Catawba River close to a frontier fortification that ensured his family's protection from Native American attacks. This area was to become part of Lincoln County, North Carolina, in 1779, and eventually Gaston County, in 1846. Thomas Dixon Jr. was his grandson.

== Revolutionary War ==
Service record:

- Lincoln County Regiment, North Carolina militia 1779-1783
- 9/9/1775, a major under Col. William Graham in the Tryon County Regiment (North Carolina)
- June 1776, back to captain.
- 1779, a lieutenant colonel of Riflemen under Col. Andrew Hampton (Rutherford County Regiment).
- May have been at the Battle of Stono Ferry in South Carolina
- At the Battle of Ramseur's Mill in North Carolina under Col. Francis Locke (Rowan County Regiment).
- Wounded at the Battle of Kings Mountain in South Carolina
- Not very active during 1781 and 1782.
- Resigned April 30, 1783.

Before serving as a soldier, Hambright was a signer of the Tryon Resolves of August 14, 1775, a document which declared that the signers would vow resistance against the British for their actions at the Battle of Lexington. He was a representative of Tryon County, at the Third Provincial Congress, which lasted from August 20 to September 10, 1775. In late 1776, Hambright took part in the Rutherford Light Horse expedition against the Overhill Cherokee.

When the war reached Tryon County in 1777, Hambright joined the colonial cause as a lieutenant colonel of the Lincoln County Regiment (locally known as "The South Fork Boys"). Hambright was called the "Terror of the Tories".

=== Battle of Kings Mountain ===
On May 22, 1780, Major Patrick Ferguson was assigned as "Inspector of the British Militia", and was promptly ordered to march to Tryon County, North Carolina, to raise troops and to protect the left flank of Lord Cornwallis's main body which occupied Charlotte, North Carolina, at the time. By September 10, Ferguson had established a military camp at Gilbert Town, North Carolina and issued a challenge to the Patriot leaders to lay down their arms or he would, "Lay waste to their country with fire and sword." After receiving this message, Patriot leaders Isaac Shelby and John Sevier quickly planned a preemptive campaign against Ferguson's army. They sent messages to military leaders William Campbell and Benjamin Cleveland to join them. The rendezvous at Sycamore Shoals on September 25, brought to Campbell's army 200 Virginians and 160 North Carolinians. Another 1,100 "Overmountain Men," volunteers from the Washington District, also arrived to fight for the Patriot cause. The army met with Cleveland's 350 men at Burke County, North Carolina, and the now 1,400–strong force marched towards the South Mountains.

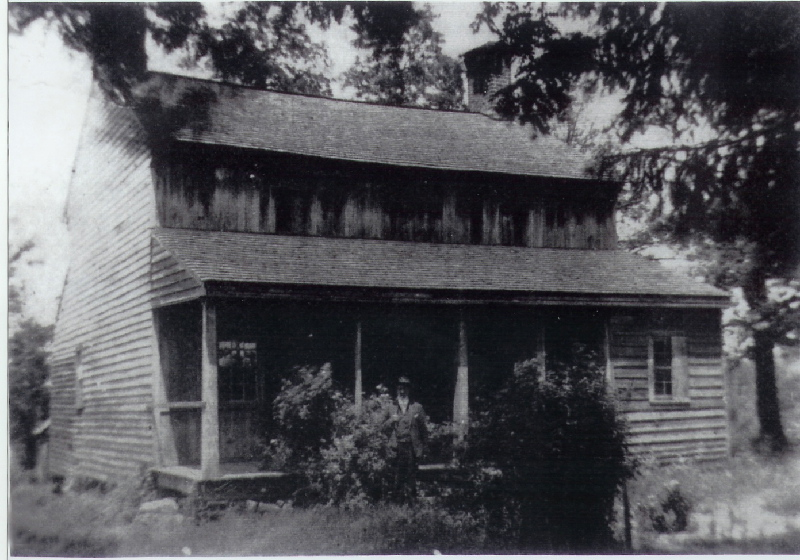
The Hambright Homestead, 1920

When word of this force reached Ferguson, he sent a message to Cornwallis asking for reinforcements. This message did not reach Cornwallis in time, and on October 1 Ferguson retreated towards the Broad River, asking for local loyalist militia to join him. By October 6, the Patriots had passed Gilbert Town and had reached Cowpens, South Carolina. Local sympathizers informed the Patriots that Ferguson had 1500 men camped on Kings Mountain.

As they were pressed for time before Ferguson would continue on to Charlotte, Patriot leaders picked 900 men—including Hambright's—to ride to Kings Mountain. By the morning of the 7th, they had reached Kings Mountain, surrounded it, and attacked. The militia's commanding officer, Col. William Graham, was absent during the battle due to an illness in his family, leaving Hambright in command. Hambright's group, along with six units, was positioned at the "ball" base beside the "heel" crest of the mountain, in position suited to attack the main Loyalist position. The objective was to catch the Loyalists by surprise. During the assault, Hambright was severely wounded from a musket ball shot to his thigh. Although bleeding badly, he continued fighting. Hambright's comrades were impressed with his bravery, and as fellow soldier, Samuel Moore, later put it:

"He knew he was wounded, but was not sick or faint from the loss of blood— [he] said he could still ride very well, and therefore deemed it his duty to fight on till the battle was over."

After the battle, Hambright was taken to his nearby log cabin for treatment. He survived, but had to resign from service due to his injury, which caused a permanent limp in Hambright's walk.

== Later life ==
After his first wife's death on July 17, 1781, Hambright married Mary Dover. Together they had ten children, eight of whom survived to maturity. He lived a quiet life on his homestead near Kings Mountain, until his death on March 9, 1817, at the age of ninety. His remains were interred at Old Shiloh Presbyterian Cemetery in Grover, North Carolina.
