= Salisbury District, North Carolina =

Colonial judicial district established in 1766

The Salisbury District of North Carolina, was originally one of six colonial judicial districts established in 1766 by the Governor William Tryon of the Province of North Carolina. Immediately preceding the onset of the American War of Independence in 1775, these six regions were renamed "military districts" by the North Carolina Provincial Congress and used for organizing the North Carolina militia. The other military districts were Edenton, Halifax, Hillsborough, New Bern, and Wilmington districts. The military district designation was discontinued in 1835 during the North Carolina Constitution Convention.

== Background ==
In 1766, the Province of North Carolina House of Burgess, at the direction of Province of North Carolina Governor William Tryon, divided the state into six judicial districts. The districts did not do away with the county divisions of the state, which continued. Since the boundaries of Tryon County (part of the Salisbury District) originally stretched into territory which was later found to belong to South Carolina (due to surveying errors), the Salisbury District was, for a time, the legal center of modern-day northwestern South Carolina as well.

After the Third North Carolina Provincial Congress held at Hillsborough, North Carolina (Aug. 20-Sept. 10, 1775), the "judicial" districts became known as "military" districts. These districts were used to organize the North Carolina Minutemen Battalions for a six month trial as state troops, beginning on September 1, 1775. By April 10, 1776, the Provincial Congress decided in favor of District Brigades of militia with county militia regiments. Each brigade was led by a brigadier general. The county militia regiments were subordinated to the brigade. At that time, two additional districts were added, further dividing the western part of the state (Washington District Regiment in 1776 and Morgan District in 1784). Also, district representatives were chosen and sent to the North Carolina Provincial Congress. These representatives were instrumental in the passage of the Halifax Resolves in April 1776 during the Fourth Provincial Congress, which is now often referred to as the "Halifax Congress."

== History ==
The Salisbury District was based in the town of Salisbury, North Carolina, in Rowan County. Salisbury was established as the county seat of Rowan County in 1755, two years after Rowan County was created from Anson County.

Edmund Fanning was made the first official associate justice for the Judicial District of Salisbury in March 1766. The third colonial court, which regularly assembled at Salisbury, was the court of oyer, terminer and general jail delivery. This court had jurisdiction over criminal cases. The Salisbury District court met in June and December of each year.

James Smith had served as the justice presiding over the "Court of Pleas and Quarter Session for Rowan County," under King George III, from 1770 thru 1775. From 1775, he "took a prominent and active part in every movement tending to throw off the yoke of tyranny..." On April 22, 1776, he was appointed to major in the Rowan County Regiment of the North Carolina militia, which was commanded by Colonel Francis Locke. Colonel Lock assumed command from Brigadier General Griffith Rutherford who was selected as commander of the Salisbury District Brigade.

== Boundaries ==
The Salisbury District originally included Anson, Guilford, Mecklenburg, Rowan, Surry, and Tryon counties. A later addition was the Washington District (also known as the original Washington County, North Carolina), which covered most of the present day State of Tennessee. Eventually, as new settlements were carved out of the wilderness, the Salisbury District encompassed the counties of Lincoln, Montgomery, Richmond, Rutherford, Wilkes (all in present-day North Carolina), and Sullivan (in present-day Tennessee) as well.

- In 1775, Salisbury District included the following counties: Rowan, Anson, Guilbord, Mecklenburg, Surry, and Tryon counties.
- In 1779, Salisbury District included the following counties: Rowan, Anson, Burke, Guilford, Lincoln, Mecklenburg, Montgomery, Richmond, Rutherford, Surry, and Wilkes counties.
- In 1783, at the end of the war, Salisbury District included: Rowan, Anson, Guiford, Mecklenburg, Montgomery, Richmond, and Surry counties.
- As late as 1800, the term Salisbury District was used in reference to the regional Federal Census headquarters in part of North Carolina. This 1800 Census district headquarters was located in Salisbury, and Iredell, Mecklenburg, and Rowan counties all list Salisbury as the location for these counties, even though Salisbury was and still is located in Rowan County.
- The Provincial Congress included representatives from counties and districts. The six districts continued to be used under the North Carolina General Assembly after 1776 until 1835 when the State Constitution Convention changed the way representatives and senators to the General Assembly were determined. After the war, the districts were sometimes referred to as boroughs or just cities. In 1835, the general assembly set up 120 districts with representation in the assembly.

== Delegates ==
The delegates from the Salisbury District to the North Carolina Provincial Congress were:

- William Kennon, 1st Provincial Congress, August 25–27, 1774 in New Bern
- William Kennon, 2nd Provincial Congress, April 3–7, 1775 in New Bern
- William Kennon and Hugh Montgomery, 3rd Provincial Congress, August 20 - September 10, 1775 in Hillsborough
- David Nesbitt, 4th Provincial Congress, April 4 - May 14, 1776 in Halifax
- David Nesbitt, 5th Provincial Congress, November 12 - December 23, 1776 in Halifax

The delegates from the Salisbury District to the North Carolina House of Commons were:

- 1st, 1777, David Nesbett
- 2nd, 1778, Matthew Troy
- 3rd, 1779, Maxwell Chambers
- 4th, 1780, Anthony Newman
- 5th, 1781, Anthony Newman (Nunan)
- 6th, 1782, Dr. Anthony Newman
- 7th, 1783, Anthony Newman (Nunan)
- 8th, 1784 April, Thomas Frohock
- 9th, 1784 October, Spruce McCoy (McCay, McKay)
- 10th, 1785, Thomas Frohock
- 11th, 1786-1787, Thomas Frohock
- 12th, 1787, John Steele
- 13th, 1788, John Steele
- 14th, 1789, Maxwell Chambers
- 15th, 1790, Maxwell Chambers
- 16th, 1791-1792, Lewis Beard
- 17th, 1792-1793, Lewis Beard
- 18th, 1793-1794, John Steele
- 19th, 1794-1795, John Steele
- 20th, 1795, John Steele
- 21st, 1796, Evan Alexander
- 22nd, 1797, John Newman
- 23rd, 1798, Evan Alexander
- 24th, 1799, Evan Alexander
- 25th, 1800, Evan Alexander
- 26th, 1801, Evan Alexander
- 27th, 1802, Evan Alexander
- 28th, 1803, Evan Alexander
- 29th, 1804, Joseph Pearson
- 30th, 1805, Joseph Pearson
- 31st, 1806, John Steele
- 32nd, 1807, Archibald Henderson
- 33rd, 1808, Archibald Henderson
- 34th, 1809, Archibald Henderson
- 35th, 1810, Joseph Chambers
- 36th, 1811, John Steele (Speaker of the House)
- 37th, 1812, John Steele
- 38th, 1813, John Steele
- 39th, 1814, Archibald Henderson
- 40th, 1815, John L. Henderson
- 41st, 1816, John L. Henderson
- 42nd, 1817, Stephen L. Ferrand
- 43rd, 1818, John Beard, Jr.
- 44th, 1819, Archibald Henderson
- 45th, 1820, Archibald Henderson
- 46th, 1821, Charles Fisher
- 47th, 1822, Alfred McKay
- 48th, 1823-1824, John L. Henderson
- 49th, 1824-1825, John L. Henderson
- 50th, 1825-1826, David F. Caldwell
- 51st, 1826-1827, Charles Fisher
- 52nd, 1827-1828, Charles Fisher
- 53rd, 1828-1829, Charles Fisher
- 54th, 1829-1830, Charles Fisher
- 55th, 1830-1831, Charles Fisher (Speaker of the House)
- 56th, 1831-1832, Charles Fisher (Speaker of the House)
- 57th, 1832-1833, Burton Craig
- 58th, 1833-1834, Richard H. Alexander
- 59th, 1834-1835, Richard H. Alexander
- 60th, 1835, William Chambers

== See also ==
- Tryon Resolves
- Tryon County Regiment (North Carolina)

== Bibliography ==
- Lewis, J.D. "Salisbury District". The American Revolution in North Carolina. Archived from the original on 2007-07-13.
- Rumple, Jethro (1916). A History of Rowan County, North Carolina Containing Sketches of Prominent Families and Distinguished Men. Daughters of the American Revolution. Elizabeth Maxwell Steele Chapter (Salisbury, N.C.).
- Hunter, Cyrus Lee (1877). Sketches of Western North Carolina, Historical and Biographical: Illustrating Principally the Revolutionary Period of Mecklenburg, Rowan, Lincoln, and Adjoining Counties, Accompanied with Miscellaneous Information, Much of it Never Before Published. Raleigh News Steam Job Print.
- "Stage Set for War in Hillsborough". NCDCR.gov. 20 August 2016.
