= Long Creek Presbyterian Church =

Presbyterian Church in North Carolina

Long Creek Presbyterian Church is a member of the Presbyterian Church (USA) and sits on a hill in Gaston County, North Carolina, in a rural area between Bessemer City and Kings Mountain. Long Creek was organized by the Orange Presbytery of the Synod of New York and Philadelphia in 1780. One of the oldest surviving churches in Gaston County, the Long Creek Presbyterian Church building was built in 1876, almost a century after the congregation was formed. This Greek Revival church is a single-story, frame building which rests on granite piers and has been underpinned with masonry brick. In December 1993, the historic sanctuary was saved from a fire which destroyed a brick choir room addition attached to the wood frame sanctuary building. The fire, determined to have been set by an arsonist, heavily damaged both the sanctuary and the Sunday School building. In the year following the fire, the church, under the leadership of former pastor James S. Welch Jr., rebuilt the choir room addition and renovated the sanctuary in keeping with historical registry requirements. The church is listed on the Gaston County historic properties registry.

One of the most interesting features of the Long Creek Presbyterian Church property is the two hundred year old cemetery enclosed by a rock wall. The earliest marked grave in the cemetery here is that of Joseph Blackwood, dated October 22, 1780. Tradition says that he was wounded in the Battle of Kings Mountain on October 7, and died a few days later. The church cemetery is the final resting place for a number of revolutionary war soldiers including Captain Samuel Espy, an officer who had served under Colonel William Graham. In 2012, a large second cemetery directly below the rock walled cemetery was discovered containing the remains of at least 90 former slaves. The discovery was made following cemetery work begun with a grant from the David Belk Cannon Foundation. The grant was awarded to professionally restore and preserve the church's traditional cemetery within the rock wall. Photos of the markers along with information on them will go onto a website available to researchers. The church is now working with local African American congregations to also preserve the additional gravesites.
