= Senator Tipton =

Senator Tipton may refer to:

- John Tipton (Tennessee frontiersman) (1730–1813), North Carolina State Senate and Tennessee State Senate
- John Tipton (1786–1839), U.S. Senator from Indiana from 1832 to 1839
- Thomas Tipton (1817–1899), U.S. Senator from Nebraska from 1867 to 1875
