= Tryon County =

Tryon County is the name of two former counties in the United States:

- Tryon County, New York- 1772-1784
- Tryon County, North Carolina- 1768-1779
