= James Holland (North Carolina politician) =

American politician

James Holland (January 12, 1754 – May 19, 1823) was a U.S. Congressman from the state of North Carolina from 1795 to 1797 and from 1801 to 1811. He served as a captain in the Lincoln County Regiment of the North Carolina militia during the American Revolution.

== Early life ==
Born near Rutherfordton, North Carolina, in 1754, Holland received a very limited education. He was a captain in the Lincoln County Regiment of the North Carolina militia from 1779 to 1781. He may have also seen service in the North Carolina Line between 1775 and 1783.

== Political career ==
He rose in political office, serving as sheriff of Tryon County (1775), justice of the peace of Rutherford County (1780–1800), and comptroller of Rutherford County from (July 1782 - January 1785). He was first elected to the North Carolina State Senate, serving in 1783 and to the North Carolina House of Commons in 1786 and 1789, and was a delegate to the Fayetteville Convention which adopted the United States Constitution in 1789. From the legislature, he was appointed to the board of trustees for the University of North Carolina at Chapel Hill; he served as a trustee from 1789 to 1795.

In the 1790s, Holland studied law; he was admitted to the bar on October 15, 1793, and began to practice law in Rutherfordton. In 1794, he was elected as a Republican to the 4th United States Congress, serving from March 4, 1795, to March 3, 1797. Although he chose not to run for re-election to Congress, he returned to the North Carolina Senate in 1797 and returned to farming and a law practice.

Holland returned to Congress in 1801, serving for five terms (March 4, 1801 – March 3, 1811), stepping down in 1810. In 1811, Holland moved to Maury County, Tennessee, where he engaged in agricultural pursuits near Columbia. He served as a justice of the peace from 1812 to 1818 and died on his estate in 1821. He is buried in the Holland Family (now known as Watson) Cemetery, nine miles east of Columbia.

U.S. House of Representatives
Preceded by Joseph McDowell	Member of the U.S. House of Representatives from North Carolina's 1st congressional district 1795–1797	Succeeded by Joseph McDowell, Jr.
Preceded by Joseph Dickson	Member of the U.S. House of Representatives from North Carolina's 1st congressional district 1801–1803	Succeeded by Thomas Wynns
Preceded by District created	Member of the U.S. House of Representatives from North Carolina's 11th congressional district 1803–1811	Succeeded by Israel Pickens
