= Tipton-Haynes State Historic Site =

- Tipton-Haynes House
- U.S. National Register of Historic Places
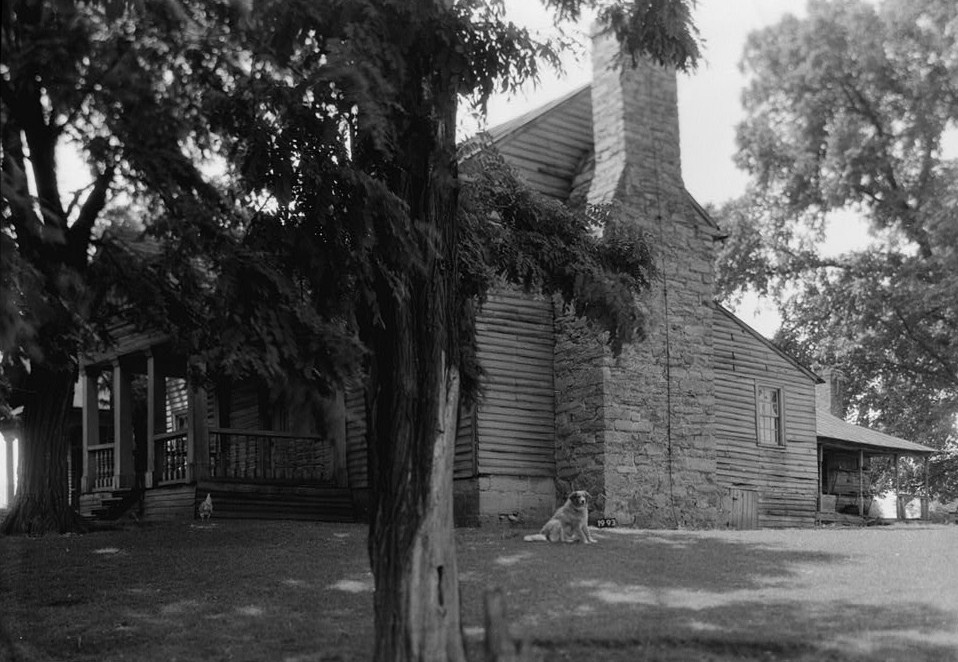
- Tipton-Haynes House in 1936

- Location within Tennessee Location within the United States
- Location: 2620 South Roan Street, Johnson City, Tennessee
- Coordinates: 36°17′37″N 82°20′6″W
- Built: 1784
- Architect: John Tipton
- NRHP reference No.: 70000620
- Added to NRHP: February 26, 1970

Tipton-Haynes State Historic Site, known also as Tipton-Haynes House, is a Tennessee State Historic Site located at 2620 South Roan Street in Johnson City, Tennessee. It includes a house originally built in 1784 by Colonel John Tipton, and 10 other buildings, including a smokehouse, pigsty, loom house, still house, springhouse, log barn and corncrib. There is also the home of George Haynes, a Haynes family slave.

Tipton led the opposition to the State of Franklin, an unsuccessful attempt by the Tennessee Valley residents to form a state in the mid-1780s. In late February 1788, the so-called "Battle of Franklin" took place when a militia led by John Sevier, who had been elected governor of the proposed state, surrounded the Tipton farm and demanded the return of several slaves Tipton had confiscated from Sevier upon court order from the State of North Carolina. When Tipton refused, gunfire was exchanged, followed by a two-day standoff. Sevier's forces were finally scattered by the Sullivan County militia. The Franklin movement largely collapsed following this engagement.

Following Tipton's death in 1813, the farm passed to his son, John Tipton, Jr. After John Tipton, Jr. died in 1831, his heirs sold the property to a local land speculator, David Haynes, in 1837. In 1839, Haynes gave the farm to his son, Landon Carter Haynes, as a wedding present. This younger Haynes enlarged the house and added weatherboarding. A Confederate senator during the Civil War, Landon Carter Haynes faced death threats from East Tennessee Unionists and was forced to flee the region in 1865. He sold the farm to his brother-in-law, Jonesborough publisher Lawson Gifford. In 1945, Gifford's grandson, David Simmerly, sold the farm to the Tennessee Historical Commission, though he continued living there until his death.

It is one of 18 State Historic Sites and is operated by the Tipton-Haynes Association under an agreement with the Tennessee Historical Commission. It was listed on the National Register of Historic Places in 1970.
