= Joseph Dickson =

American politician (1745–1825)

Member of the U.S. House of Representatives from North Carolina's 1st district
- In office March 4, 1799 – March 3, 1801
- Preceded by: Joseph McDowell, Jr.
- Succeeded by: James Holland

Speaker of the Tennessee House of Representatives
- In office 1809–1811
- Preceded by: John Tipton
- Succeeded by: John Cocke

Member of the North Carolina Senate
- In office 1788-1795

Personal details
- Born: April 1745 Chester County, Province of Pennsylvania, British America
- Died: April 14, 1825 (aged 79–80) Rutherford County, Tennessee, U.S.
- Party: Federalist
- Spouse: Margaret McEwen
- Children: Robert Dickson, Elizabeth Dickson, John Dickson, Joseph Dickson Jr., William Dickson, Margaret Dickson, Ezekiel Dickson, Isabella Dickson, James L. Dickson
- Military career
- Allegiance: United States of America
- Branch: North Carolina militia
- Service years: 1775-1783
- Rank: Colonel during war, Brigadier General after the war
- Units: Rowan County Regiment, 1st Battalion of Volunteers, Lincoln County Regiment, North Carolina State Cavalry-Western District
- Commands: Lincoln County Regiment

Joseph Dickson (April 1745 – April 14, 1825) was an American politician and soldier who represented North Carolina's 1st district in the United States House of Representatives from 1799 to 1801, and would later serve in the Tennessee House of Representatives.

He was born in Chester County in the Province of Pennsylvania, though eventually moved with his parents to Rowan County in the Province of North Carolina. He was engaged in cotton and tobacco planting.

== Military service ==
Service record:

- Captain in the Rowan County Regiment of the North Carolina militia (1775)
- Captain in the 1st Rowan County Regiment of militia (1775-1776)
- Captain in the 1st Battalion of Volunteers (1776)
- Major in the Lincoln County Regiment of the North Carolina militia (1779-1780)
- Major in the North Carolina State Cavalry-Western District of the North Carolina state troops (1780)
- Colonel over the Lincoln County Regiment of the North Carolina militia (1781-1783)
- Brigadier General, after the Revolutionary War

He was commissioned Colonel over the Lincoln County Regiment of the North Carolina militia under Colonel Charles McDowell of the Morgan District Brigade in 1781. He was at the Battle of Kings Mountain as major of the Lincoln County Regiment. He led his regiment in the Battle of Haw River on February 25, 1781.

== Civilian service ==
Before the Revolutionary War, he was a member of Rowan County Committee of Safety. Dickson was elected clerk of the Lincoln County Court in 1781, and was a member of the North Carolina Senate from 1788 to 1795. During this time, he was appointed to the commission to establish the University of North Carolina at Chapel Hill. He was elected as a Federalist to the Sixth Congress in 1798, representing North Carolina's 1st district.

Dickson moved to Tennessee in 1803 and settled in that portion of Davidson County which subsequently became Rutherford County. He was a member of the Tennessee House of Representatives from 1807 to 1811, serving as speaker the last two years.

== Family ==
He was married to Margaret McEwen, daughter of James McEwen and Isabella Miller. He died in Rutherford County, Tennessee and is interred on his plantation northeast of Murfreesboro, Tennessee at the Boyd Cemetery, Compton, Rutherford County, Tennessee.

U.S. House of Representatives
Preceded by Joseph McDowell, Jr.	Member of the U.S. House of Representatives from North Carolina's 1st congressional district 1799–1801	Succeeded by James Holland
