= Grover, North Carolina =

- Town
- Seal

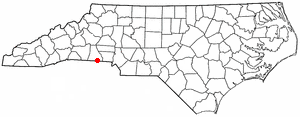
- Location of Grover, North Carolina
- Coordinates: 35°10′24″N 81°27′07″W
- Country: United States
- State: North Carolina
- County: Cleveland

Area
  - Total: 0.98 sq mi (2.55 km^{2})
  - Land: 0.95 sq mi (2.47 km^{2})
  - Water: 0.031 sq mi (0.08 km^{2})
- Elevation: 860 ft (260 m)

Population (2020)
  - Total: 802
  - Density: 839.3/sq mi (324.06/km^{2})
- Time zone: UTC-5 (Eastern (EST))
  - Summer (DST): UTC-4 (EDT)
- ZIP code: 28073
- Area code: 704
- FIPS code: 37-28400
- GNIS feature ID: 2406624
- Website: grover.municipalimpact.com

Grover is a town in Cleveland County, North Carolina, United States. As of the 2020 census, Grover had a population of 802.

== History ==
Grover is classified as a small town where railway and highway routes Interstate 85 and U.S. Route 29 cross the state line between North Carolina and South Carolina. It was previously named Whitaker and legally was in South Carolina. The name change to Grover in 1885 was in honor of President Grover Cleveland. Gingerbread Row, (Cleveland Avenue - NC Highway 226) has an antique look with many restored homes in beautiful colors.

A railroad-dominated town started when the Atlanta Charlotte Airline Railway placed a turntable for engines to be spun. They operated from the 1880s to the 1920s and Southern Railway (U.S.) continues to carry passengers to this day (now known as Norfolk Southern). Mail drops and pickups by train occurred several times per day in Grover often with the mail bag put on a hook while the train came through at speed. Amtrak also operates on the line (under permission) and carries passengers from Atlanta to Charlotte, Richmond, Boston, and New York City. George W. Bush made a rail stop in Grover during his U.S. Presidential campaign.

Grover is also home to international companies like Eaton, Commercial Vehicle Group, Southern Power, 84 Lumber, Uniquetex, and the US Presidential Culinary Museum and Library. Hatcher Hughes previously lived in Grover and won the Pulitzer Prize in 1924 for his Broadway play, Hell-Bent Fer Heaven, a show about his own people from the area of the foothills - where Grover is located. He was a professor at the Ivy League college Columbia University. The Hambright (Hambrecht) family of Philadelphia and Prussia lives in Grover and built the tallest and largest mansion there in 1879 under the guidance of Doctor Alfred Frederick Hambright (Hambrecht). Grover also hosts a former White House Chef and manager of the Presidential resort and conference center Camp David, Martin CJ Mongiello, who lives there.

Grover is a part of Cleveland County, North Carolina. The county is named after Colonel Benjamin Cleveland (Cleaveland - Thorkil de Cleveland of Cleveland County York, England in the year 1066) - of the King's Mountain battle - a companion of Colonel Frederick Hambright (with his son John by his side) during the Revolutionary War. Grover holds as many North Carolina Official Historical Markers as the county seat of Shelby. It was the town of entry by The Marquess, Lord Charles Cornwallis when he invaded North Carolina with his cavalry, artillery, and army. The butcher of New Jersey, Major Patrick Ferguson, also camped near parts of present-day Grover, prior to battle on King's Mountain, a local mountain range named after the King Family that lived there. In 1887, the legislature voted to change the name of Grover's County - to the more utilized English word version of, "Cleveland", from its previous version of Cleaveland. President Grover Cleveland had been in office since 1885 (the first Democrat elected after the American Civil War).

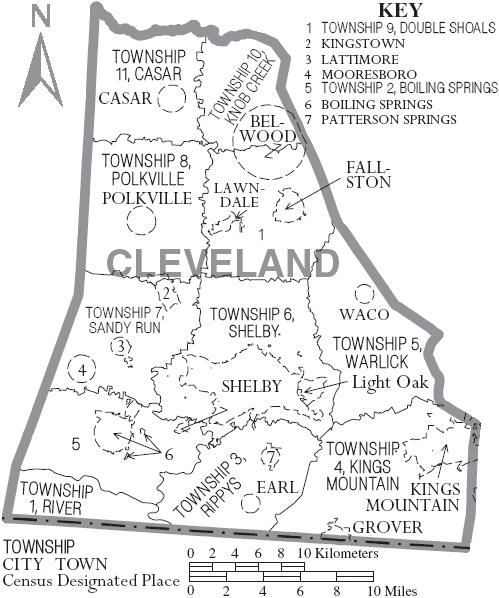
Map of Cleveland County, North Carolina With Municipal and Township Labels

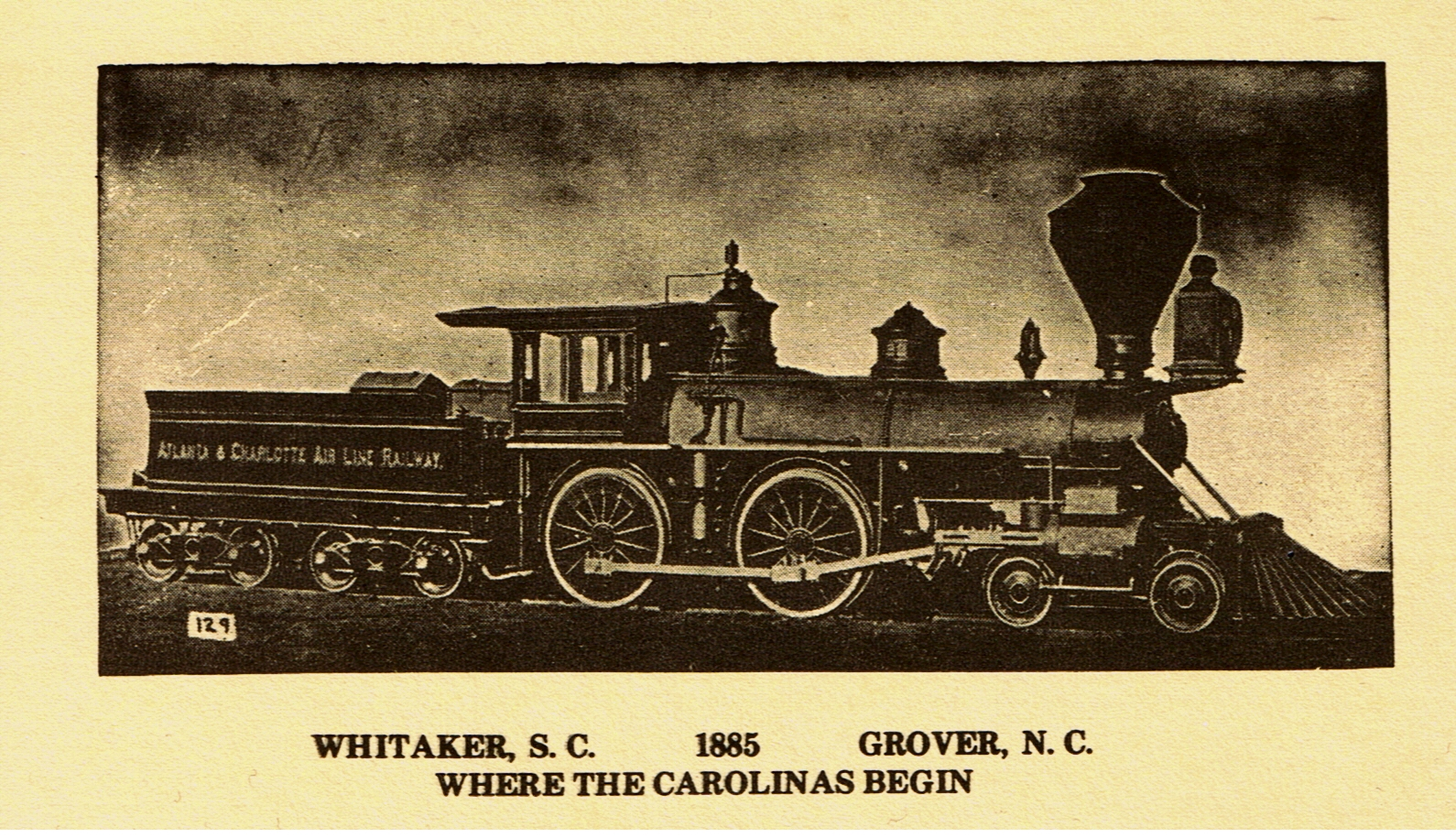
A train engine in Grover ready to spin on the turn-table circa 1885 - antique postcard

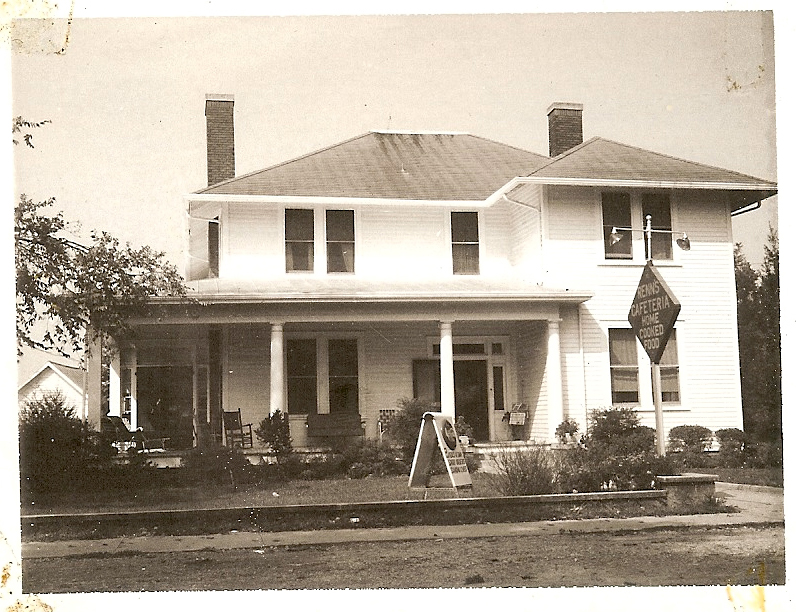
The famed Hambright (Hambrecht) family dynasty crown jewel mansion that welcomed people to Grover for 30 years from 1948 to 1978 is now The Inn of the Patriots, since 2008

This portion of history affected local matters. A German bachelor, Grover Cleveland, was ill at ease at first with all the comforts of the White House. "I must go to dinner," he wrote to a friend, "but I wish it was to eat a pickled herring, a Swiss cheese, and a chop at Louis' instead of the French stuff I shall find." He gained advance publicity and coverage as did the town of Grover. A portion of the original plan encompassed renaming the town after the President's first name to attain notice. In June 1886, this predicament would be fixed for Grover. President Cleveland married 21-year-old Frances Folsom; he was the only President ever married in the White House. This historic event and the ensuing honeymoon took on news attention. The name change of Grover's county took on epic proportions shortly after this event. The town, White House and county historically affected each other in an unpredicted manner. In 1887, Cleaveland County held a referendum and vote to change its name to the more popular spelling of, "Cleveland". The latest, mistaken report of this (verified July 2008) with a letter delivered by the US Postal Service, from the White House Historical Society to The Inn of the Patriots, 301 Cleveland Avenue, Grover Cleveland, NC 28073. No such town exists in America.

Cleveland Avenue (Route 226) runs through Grover - parallel to Main Street. Many Hambright's (Hambrecht's), Hamrick's and Herndon's lived on Cleveland Avenue. Today, the Shiloh Presbyterian Church (built in 1905) remains next to Doctor Alfred Hambright's (Hambrecht) home that was built after the Civil War. A statue was dedicated to Colonel Frederick Hambright (Hambrecht Prussian family) and US Marine Corporal, Clyde Furman Horton on July 1, 2008. The Shiloh Presbyterian Church Cemetery was listed on the National Register of Historic Places in 2011.

Many other prominent names dominate the makeup of Grover and are listed repeatedly in reference level books of the Cleveland County Library System, families like Herndon, Hambright (Hambrecht), Hamrick, Rountree, Keeter, Graham, Cleaveland, Cleveland, Scruggs, and Goforth. Within the history of Grover - it is often confused with President Grover Cleveland versus Benjamin Cleveland and where the names came from. Although, each Cleveland are related - going back to Amos Cleveland, of Massachusetts and Cleveland, Ohio.

Grover is in the process of restoring itself to a town with a 'turn-of-the-century look and feel'. Its train and spinning engine turntable with history applied for such in a 2010 North Carolina Main Street program. The current mayor is Bill Willis. The town historian for a long period was Doctor Cobia Goforth who died in late 2017.

== Geography ==
According to the United States Census Bureau, the town has a total area of 1.0 square mile (2.6 km^{2}), of which 1.0 square mile (2.6 km^{2}) is land and 0.04 square miles (0.10 km^{2}) (2.94%) is water.

== Demographics ==
Historical population
Census	Pop.	Note	%±
1890	126		—
1900	174		38.1%
1910	209		20.1%
1920	296		41.6%
1930	435		47.0%
1940	469		7.8%
1950	535		14.1%
1960	538		0.6%
1970	555		3.2%
1980	597		7.6%
1990	516		−13.6%
2000	698		35.3%
2010	708		1.4%
2020	802		13.3%
2022 (est.)	808	▲	0.7%
U.S. Decennial Census

=== 2020 census ===
Grover racial composition
Race	Number	Percentage
White (non-Hispanic)	622	77.56%
Black or African American (non-Hispanic)	86	10.72%
Native American	1	0.12%
Asian	16	2.0%
Pacific Islander	1	0.12%
Other/Mixed	49	6.11%
Hispanic or Latino	27	3.37%

As of the 2020 United States census, there were 802 people, 272 households, and 187 families residing in the town.

=== 2000 census ===
At the 2000 census, there were 698 people, 280 households and 206 families residing in the town. The population density was 706.2 inhabitants per square mile (272.7/km^{2}). There were 313 housing units at an average density of 316.7 per square mile (122.3/km^{2}). The racial makeup of the town was 91.12% White, 7.16% African American, 0.72% Asian, 0.29% from other races, and 0.72% from two or more races. Hispanic or Latino of any race were 1.43% of the population.

There were 280 households, of which 36.8% had children under the age of 18 living with them, 55.0% were married couples living together, 13.6% had a female householder with no husband present, and 26.1% were non-families. 23.2% of all households were made up of individuals, and 10.4% had someone living alone who was 65 years of age or older. The average household size was 2.49 and the average family size was 2.92.

26.8% of the population were under the age of 18, 8.7% from 18 to 24, 29.1% from 25 to 44, 22.5% from 45 to 64, and 12.9% who were 65 years of age or older. The median age was 34 years. For every 100 females, there were 89.2 males. For every 100 females age 18 and over, there were 81.9 males.

The median household income was $32,083 and the median family income was $43,000. Males had a median income of $33,977 and females $25,769 for females. The per capita income was $16,132. About 13.5% of families and 12.9% of the population were below the poverty line, including 14.8% of those under age 18 and 11.4% of those age 65 or over.

== Transportation ==
- I-85—Exits SC 106 & NC 2 serve the town. There is an SC Welcome Center at milemarker SC 103 and NC 3. Grover straddles the state line.
- US 29—two and four lanes. Runs through the downtown area and serves next to the Norfolk Southern railroad tracks and alongside Main Street.

== Education ==
There is one public elementary school, Grover Elementary, located in the town. Numerous, public, middle and high schools are located nearby in Kings Mountain, NC. Kings Mountain High School is the largest in the region and is listed as the 199th best high school in North Carolina.

== See also ==
- Kings Mountain National Military Park
- American Revolutionary War, Battle of Kings Mountain
- Crowder's Mountain
- Kings Mountain State Park
- Daniel Stowe Botanical Garden
- Parker Hannifin
- U.S. National Whitewater Center
