= William Cage (Tennessee politician) =

American politician

Speaker of the Franklin House of Representatives
- In office June 1785 – December 1788
- Preceded by: Position established
- Succeeded by: Position abolished

Member of the North Carolina House of Commons
- In office 1783–1784

Personal details
- Born: 1745 Colony of Virginia
- Died: March 1811 (aged 65–66) Sumner County, Tennessee
- Relations: Harry T. Hays (grandson); John Coffee Hays (grandson)
- Children: 6

Military service
- Battles/wars: American Revolutionary War

William Cage (1745 – March 1811) was an American politician in North Carolina and Tennessee and an early settler in Tennessee. He was a member of the North Carolina House of Representatives (then called the House of Commons) in 1783 and 1784. He briefly held the position of State Treasurer and Speaker of the State House of Representatives in the 18th century, from August 1784 to June 1785, representing the proposed State of Franklin.

== Biography ==
William Cage was born in Virginia in 1745. Before the American Revolutionary War, he moved to Chatham County, North Carolina. During the war, he served as a major in the United States Army and was active in suppressing the Tories commanded by David Fanning. After the war, he moved to Sullivan County, North Carolina where he was elected to the North Carolina House of Representatives (then called the House of Commons) in sessions in 1783 and 1784. The other legislators from Sullivan County at that time were Colonel Abraham Bledsoe and David Looney. In 1774, there was a movement to form the state of Franklin from a group of western North Carolina counties. Cage took a central role in the movement, and was appointed treasurer and elected speaker of the lower house of the first assembly of the provisional state, serving from August 1784 to June 1785.

In 1785 he moved further west to what is now Sumner County, Tennessee, with the Bledsoe family. The Southwest Territory was organized in 1790 to govern the area, and Cage was appointed by Governor William Blount sheriff of Sumner county, a position he held until 1796 when he was succeeded by his son James Cage. Cage was a member of the first session of the Court of Pleas and Quarter Sessions after Tennessee statehood in 1796.

== Death and legacy ==
William Cage died at his home in Sumner County, Tennessee in March 1811. He had at least two sons, the aforementioned James and another, Harry, who moved to Mississippi where he was a legislator and judge. Two of his grandsons were also notable, Harry T. Hays and John Coffee Hays. He also had four daughters.

The area along the Cumberland River near his home is now known as Cage's Bend and is the location of Cage's Bend State Park.

== See also ==
- State of Franklin
