= Lincoln County Regiment =

- Active: 1779-1783
- Allegiance: North Carolina
- Branch: North Carolina militia
- Type: Militia
- Part of: Brigade

Commanders
- Notable commanders: Col. William Graham; Col. Charles McLean; Col. Joseph Dickson

The Lincoln County Regiment was a local militia in Lincoln County, North Carolina during the American Revolutionary. It was created by the North Carolina General Assembly of 1778 on February 8, 1779 at the same time that Lincoln County was created from part of Tryon County. The Tryon County Regiment from which the Lincoln County Regiment was created was abolished upon creation of the Lincoln County Regiment. The Lincoln County Regiment was initially subordinate to the Salisbury District Brigade. It was re-subordinated to the newly created Morgan District Brigade in may of 1782, where it was active till the end of the war.

== Officers ==
The following were the officers in the Lincoln County Regiment: Commanders:

- Col. William Graham (1779-1781)
- Col. Charles McLean (1779-1783)
- Col. Joseph Dickson (1781-183)

Known Lt Colonels:

- Lt. Col. William Erwin
- Lt. Col. Frederick Hambright
- Lt. Col. John Barber
- Lt. Col. William Davenport
- Lt. Col. Daniel McKisick
- Lt. Col. Robert Smith

Known Majors:

- Maj. Joseph Dickson
- Maj. Francis McCorkle
- Maj. John Barber
- Maj. John Carruth
- Maj. William Chronicle
- Maj. Joseph Graham
- Maj. Jonathan Gullick
- Maj. James Johnson
- Maj. Daniel McKisick
- Maj. Tutt

Known Commissaries:

- Joseph Henry, Commisasry and Wagon Master
- Thomas McGee, Assistant Commissary
- Adolph Reep, Commissary

Known Captains

- Robert Alexander
- William Armstrong
- James Baird
- John Baldridge
- John Barber
- James Blackwell
- Hugh Blair
- Samuel Caldwell
- William Caldwell
- John Carruth
- William Chronicle
- John Clark
- Joseph Collins
- John Cook
- John Culbertson
- John Philip Dellinger
- James Duff
- Samuel Espey
- Abraham Forney
- Peter Forney
- Nicholas Friday
- William Frisal
- John Garrett
- William Graham
- John Hardin Hambright
- John Hazzleburger
- Malcolm Henry
- James Holland
- William Hutchison
- James Johnson
- William Johnston
- Thomas Lofton
- Frank Long
- James Lytle
- Josiah Martin
- Samuel Martin
- Charles Mattocks
- John Mattocks
- Francis McCorkle
- Joseph McDonnell
- Thomas McGee
- Daniel McKisick
- John Mills
- Jacob Mooney
- John Moore
- William Moore
- James Morrison
- John Murray
- Joseph Neal
- Benjamin Newton
- Ephraim Perkins
- Adam Reep
- Taylor W. Richardson
- John Robinson
- William Sherrill
- Martin Shuford from Family Genealogy Records
- Peter Sides
- George Smith
- William Stewart
- William Tabor
- Lee Taylor
- John Walker
- John Weir
- Isaac White
- Thomas White
- Henry Whitener
- John Work

== History ==
Known engagements during the American Revolution include:

Date	Battles/Skirmishes	State
March 3, 1779	Battle of Briar Creek	GA
April 10, 1779	Battle of Chickamauga (Towns)	TN
April 29, 1779	Skirmish at Purrysburg	SC
June 20, 1779	Battle of Stono Ferry	SC
March 28, 1780-May 12, 1780	Siege of Charleston (1780)	SC
Jun 20, 1780	Battle of Ramseur's Mill	NC
July 21, 1780	Battle of Colson's Mill	NC
July 26, 1780	Battle of Thicketty Fort	SC
July 30, 1780	Battle of Rocky Mount	SC
August 8, 1780	Battle of Wofford's Iron Works	SC
August 11, 1780	Battle of Little Lynches Creek	SC
August 16, 1780	Battle of Camden	SC
August 16, 1780	Battle of Rugeley's Mills #1	SC
August 18, 1780	Battle of Fishing Creek	SC
September 1, 1780	Battle of Graham's Fort	NC
October 7, 1780	Battle of Kings Mountain	SC
December 4, 1780	Battle of Rugeley's Mills #2	SC
January 17, 1781	Battle of Cowpens	SC
February 1, 1781	Battle of Cowan's Ford	NC
February 1, 1781	Battle of Torrant's/Tarrant's Tavern	NC
February 25, 1781	Battle of Haw River	NC
March 6, 1781	Battle of Whitesell's Mill	NC
March 7, 1781	Battle of Reedy Fork	NC
March 15, 1781	Battle of Guilford Court House	NC
April 25, 1781	Battle of Hobkirk's Hill	SC
May 21, 1781-June 19, 1781	Siege of Ninety-Six 1781	SC
September 8, 1781	Battle of Eutaw Springs	SC
June 1, 1782-October 31, 1782	Cherokee Expedition 1782	NC/TN

== See also ==
- Salisbury District Brigade
