= State of Franklin =

Former unrecognized proposed US state

The State of Franklin Frankland
- Extra-Legal States and Territories; Historic Regions of the United States
- August 1784 – December 1788
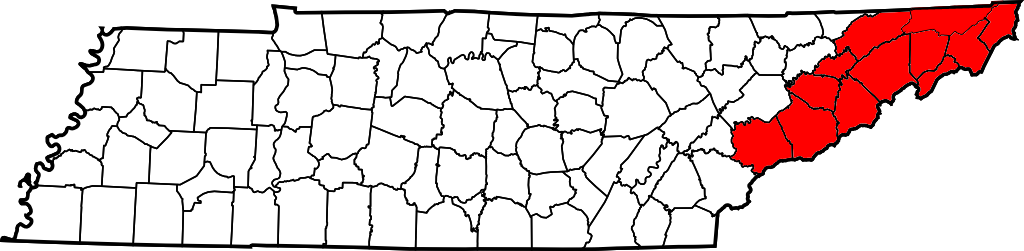
- The state of Franklin highlighted on a map of Tennessee
- Capital: Jonesborough (August 1784 – December 1785); Greeneville (December 1785 – 1788)
- Area
  - Coordinates: 36°10′N 82°49′W
- Government
  - Type: Republic / Organized, extralegal territory
- "Governor" (President)
  - December 1784 – December 1788: President/Governor Col. John Sevier
- Speaker of the Senate
  - December 1784 – December 1788: Landon Carter
  - Speaker of the House August 1784 – June 1785: William Cage
  - Speaker of the House June 1785 – December 1788: Col. Joseph Hardin
- Legislature: Congress of Greeneville
  - Upper house: Senate
  - Lower House: House of Representatives
- Historical era: post American Revolution
  - North Carolina cedes the Washington District to federal government: April 1784
  - Secedes from North Carolina and blocks federal government claims; Franklin proclaimed: 23 August 1784
  - Petition for Frankland statehood sent to Congress: May 16, 1785
  - Provisional name changed to "Franklin": December 24, 1785
  - Disbanded; and area re-acquired by North Carolina: March–September 1788 1788
  - Area is designated part of the Southwest Territory: 1790
- Political subdivisions: Counties
Preceded by	Succeeded by
North Carolina	North Carolina
- Today part of: East Tennessee, United States

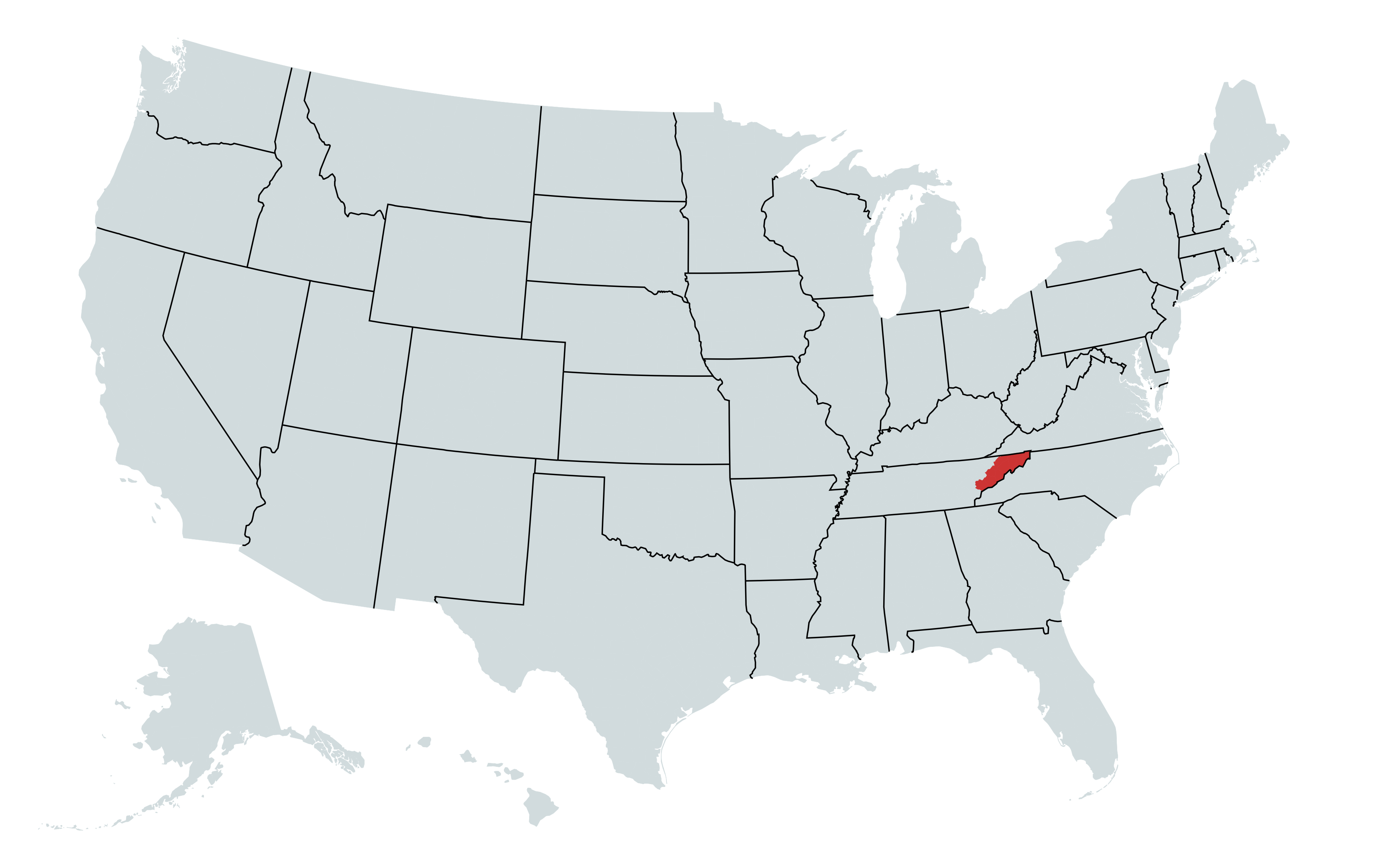
State of Franklin on U.S. map

The State of Franklin (also the Free Republic of Franklin, Lost State of Franklin, or the State of Frankland) (Note: Landrum, refers to the proposed state as "the proposed republic of Franklin; while Wheeler has it as Frankland." In That's Not in My American History Book, Thomas Ayres maintains that the official title was "Free Republic of Franklin".) was an unrecognized state located in present-day East Tennessee, in the United States. Franklin was created in 1784 from part of the territory west of the Appalachian Mountains that had been offered by North Carolina as a cession to Congress to help pay off debts related to the American War for Independence. It was founded with the intent of becoming the 14th state of the new United States.

Franklin's first capital was Jonesborough. After the summer of 1787, the government of Franklin (which was by then based in Greeneville) ruled as a "parallel government" running alongside (but not harmoniously with) a re-established North Carolina bureaucracy. Franklin was never admitted into the union. The extra-legal state existed for only about four and a half years, ostensibly as a republic, after which North Carolina reassumed full control of the area.

The creation of Franklin is novel, in that it resulted from both a cession (an offering from North Carolina to Congress) and a secession (seceding from North Carolina, when its offer to Congress was not acted upon and the original cession was rescinded).

If Franklin had become a state, its boundaries would have included the 12 modern Tennessee counties of Johnson, Carter, Sullivan, Washington, Greene, Hawkins, Unicoi, Cocke, Hamblen, Jefferson, Sevier, and Blount. With an approximate total area of 6,400 square miles (17,000 km^{2}), Franklin would rank as the 4th smallest state by area in the Union, ahead of Connecticut, Delaware, and Rhode Island. Its population, estimated at 930,000 based on the current populations of these counties, would place it as the 6th smallest state by population, ahead of South Dakota, North Dakota, Alaska, Vermont, and Wyoming.

== Concept ==
The concept of a new western state came from Arthur Campbell of Washington County, Virginia, and John Sevier. They believed the Overmountain towns should be admitted to the United States as a separate state. They differed, however, on the details of such a state, although John Sevier (in a letter written in 1782) acknowledged Campbell's leadership on the issue. Campbell's proposed state would have included southwestern Virginia, eastern Tennessee, and parts of Kentucky, Georgia, and Alabama. Sevier favored a more limited state, that being the eastern section of the old Washington District, which was then part of North Carolina.

Although many of the frontiersmen supported the idea, Campbell's calls for the creation of an independent state carved out of parts of Virginia territory caused Virginia governor and Kentucky land speculator Patrick Henry—who opposed a loss of territory for the state—to pass a law that forbade anyone to attempt to create a new state from Virginia by the cession of state territory. After Virginia Gov. Henry stopped Campbell, Sevier and his followers renamed their proposed state Franklin and sought support for their cause from Benjamin Franklin. The Frankland movement had little success on the Kentucky frontier, as settlers there wanted their own state (which they achieved in 1792).

== Cession and rescission ==
=== Franklin's support ===
The United States Congress was heavily in debt at the close of the American War for Independence. In April 1784, the state of North Carolina voted "to give Congress the 29,000,000 acres (45,000 sq mi; 120,000 km^{2}) (Note: About 40 times the size of Rhode Island.) lying between the Allegheny Mountains" (as the entire Appalachian range was then called) "and the Mississippi River" to help offset its war debts. This area was a large part of what had been the Washington District (usually referred to simply as the Western Counties). These western counties had originally been acquired by lease from the Overhill Cherokee, out of which the Watauga Republic had arisen.

The North Carolina cession to the federal government had a stipulation that Congress would have to accept responsibility for the area within two years, which, for various reasons, it was reluctant to do. The cession effectively left the western settlements of North Carolina alone in dealing with the Cherokee of the area, many of whom had not yet made peace with the new nation. These developments were not welcomed by the frontiersmen, who had pushed even further westward, gaining a foothold on the western Cumberland River at Fort Nashborough (now Nashville), or the Overmountain Men, many of whom had settled in the area during the days of the old Watauga Republic. Inhabitants of the region feared that the cash-starved federal Congress might even be desperate enough to sell the frontier territory to a competing foreign power (such as France or Spain).

=== North Carolina's reluctance ===
A few months later, a newly elected North Carolina Legislature re-evaluated the situation. Realizing the land could not at that time be used for its intended purpose of paying the debts of Congress and weighing the perceived economic loss of potential real estate opportunities, it rescinded the offer of cession and reasserted its claim to the remote western district. The North Carolina lawmakers ordered judges to hold court in the western counties and arranged to enroll a brigade of soldiers for defense, appointing John Sevier to form it.

== Secessionist movement ==
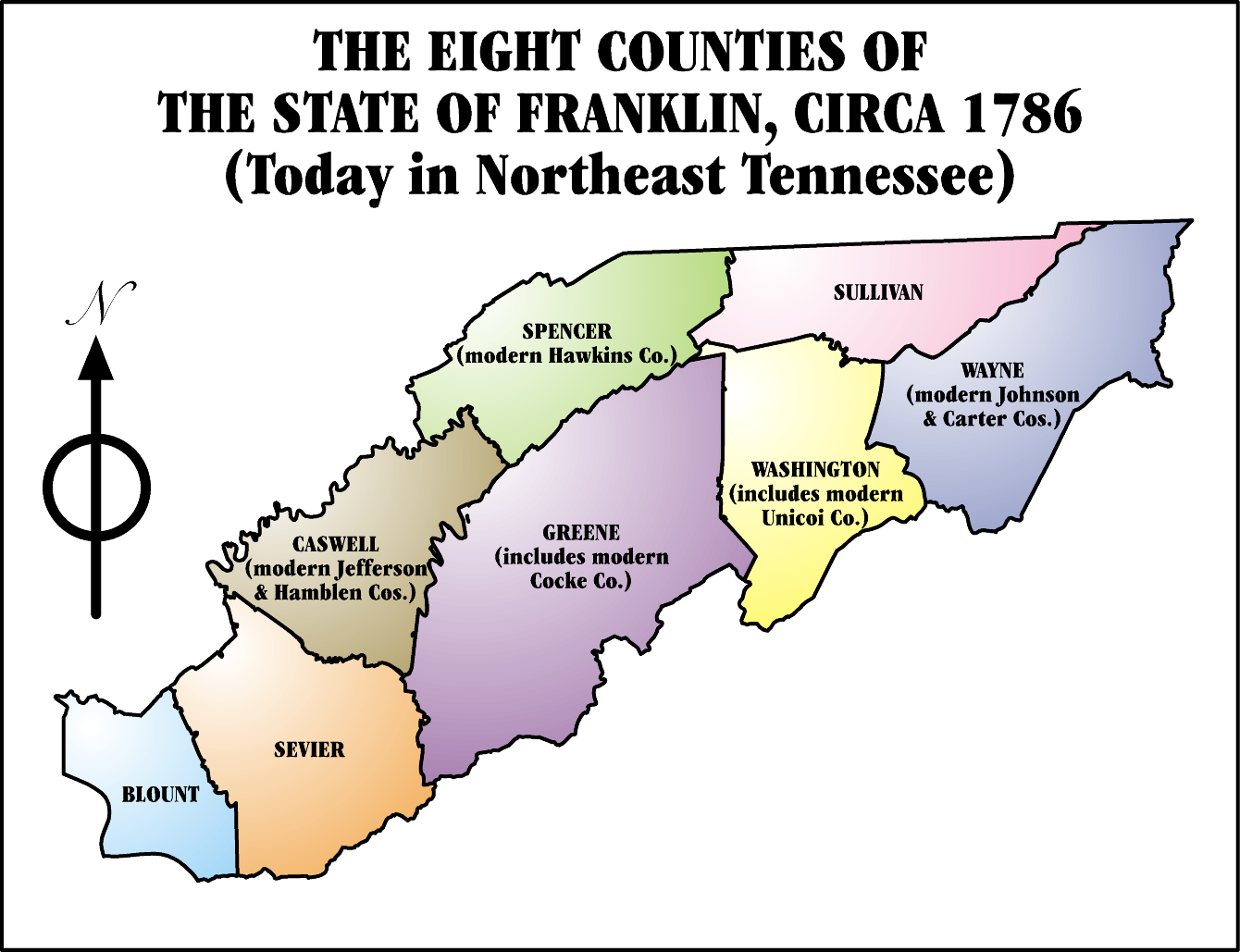
The State of Franklin and its counties

Rapidly increasing dissatisfaction with North Carolina's governance led to the frontiersmen's calls to establish a separate, secure, and independent state. On August 23, 1784, delegates from the North Carolina counties of Washington (which at the time included present-day Carter County), Sullivan, Spencer (now Hawkins County) and Greene—all of which are in present-day Tennessee—convened in the town of Jonesborough. There, they declared the lands to be independent of the State of North Carolina.

Leaders were duly elected. John Sevier reluctantly became governor; Landon Carter, speaker of the Senate; William Cage, first speaker of the House of Representatives; and David Campbell, judge of the Superior Court. Thomas Talbot served as Senate clerk, while Thomas Chapman served as clerk of the House. The delegates were called to a constitutional convention held at Jonesborough in December of that year. There, they drafted a constitution that excluded lawyers, doctors, and preachers as candidates for election to the legislature. The constitution was defeated in referendum. Afterward, the area continued to operate under tenets of the North Carolina state constitution.

== Attempt at statehood ==
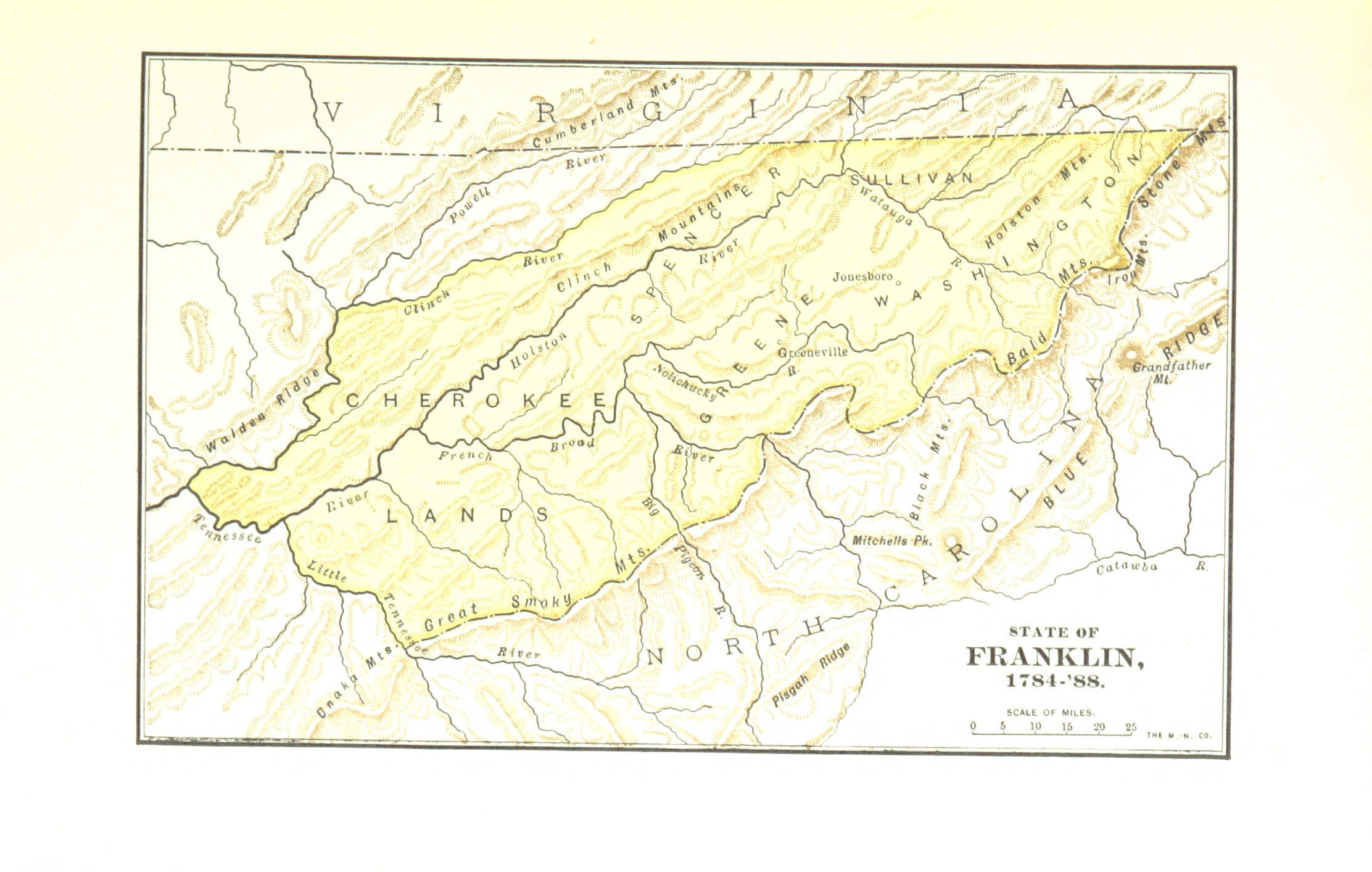
Contemporaneous map of the State of Franklin

On May 16, 1785, a delegation submitted a petition for statehood to Congress. Eventually, seven states voted to admit what would have been the 14th federal state under the proposed name of "Frankland". This was, however, less than the two-thirds majority required under the Articles of Confederation to add additional states to the confederation. The following month, the Franklin government convened to address their options and to replace the vacancy at speaker of the House, to which position they elected Joseph Hardin. In an attempt to curry favor for their cause, delegation leaders changed the "official" name of the area to "Franklin" (ostensibly after Benjamin Franklin). Sevier even tried to persuade Franklin to support their cause by letter, but he declined, writing:

... I am sensible of the honor which your Excellency and your council thereby do me. But being in Europe when your State was formed, I am too little acquainted with the circumstances to be able to offer you anything just now that may be of importance since everything material that regards your welfare will doubtless have occurred to yourselves. ... I will endeavor to inform myself more perfectly of your affairs by inquiry and searching the records of Congress and if anything should occur to me that I think may be useful to you, you shall hear from me thereupon.

— Benjamin Franklin, Letter to Governor John Sevier, 1787

== Independent republic ==
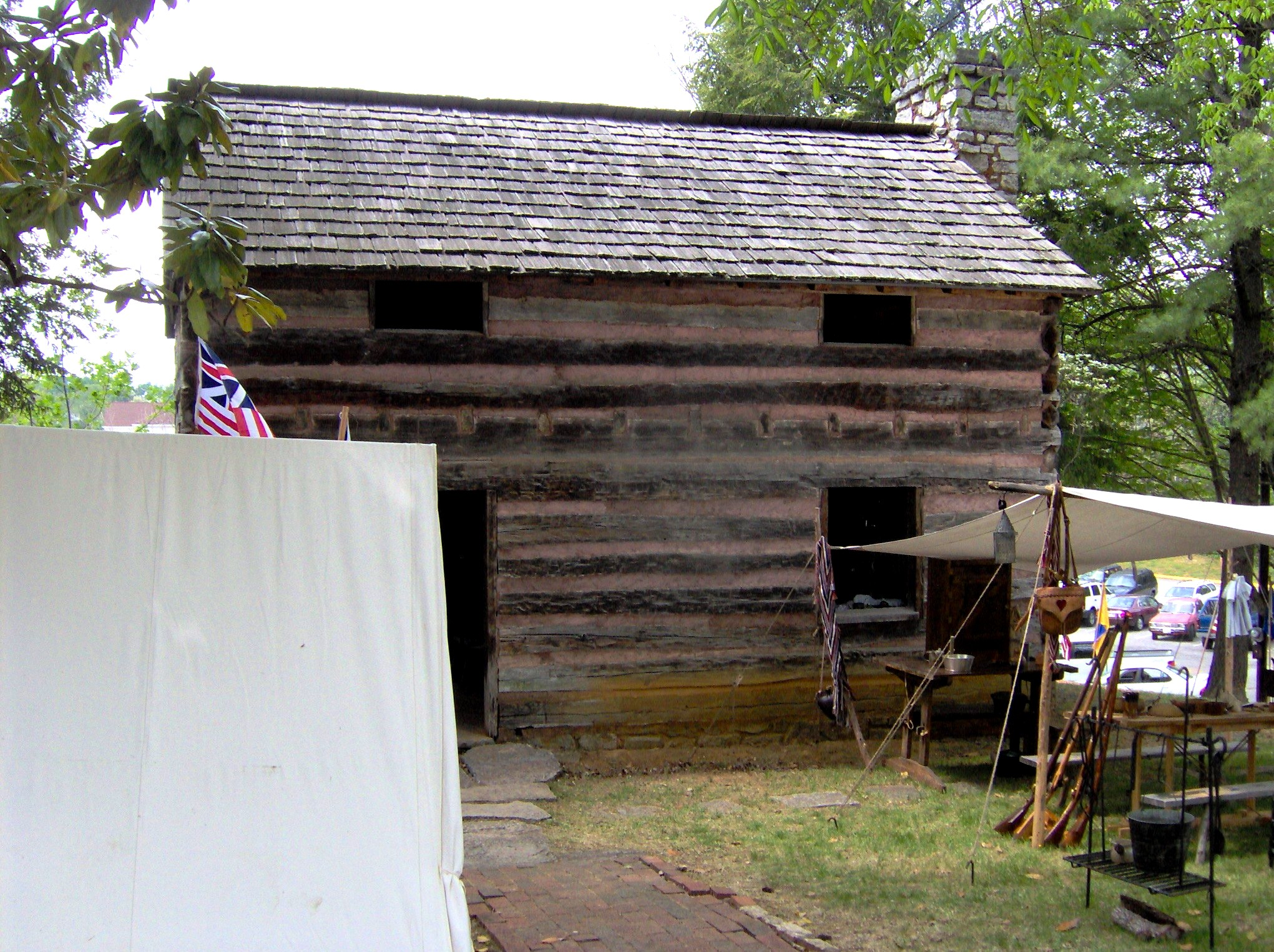
Replica of the Capitol of the State of Franklin in Greeneville, Tennessee

Franklin, still at odds with North Carolina over taxation, protection, and other issues, began operating as a de facto independent republic after the failed statehood attempt. Greeneville was declared the new capital. The government had previously been assembling at Jonesborough, only blocks away from the North Carolina-backed rival seat of government. The first legislature met in Greeneville in December 1785. The delegates adopted a permanent constitution, known as the Holston Constitution, which was modeled closely upon that of North Carolina. John Sevier also proposed to commission a Franklin state flag, but it was never designed.

Franklin opened courts, incorporated and annexed five new counties (see map below), and fixed taxes and officers' salaries. Barter became the economic system de jure, with anything in common use among the people allowed in payment to settle debts, including corn, cotton, tobacco, apple brandy, and skins. (Sevier was often paid in deer hides.) Federal or foreign currencies were accepted. All citizens were granted a two-year reprieve on paying taxes, but the lack of hard currency and economic infrastructure slowed development and often created confusion.

=== Relations with Native Americans ===
The new legislature made peace treaties with the Native American tribes in the area (with few exceptions, the most notable being the Chickamauga Cherokee). The Cherokee claim to sovereignty over much of the area of southern Franklin, though already occupied by the United States, was maintained at the 1785 Treaty of Hopewell with the federal government. In 1786, Samuel Wear helped negotiate the competing Treaty of Coyatee on behalf of the State of Franklin. Coyatee re-affirmed the 1785 Treaty of Dumplin Creek, which the republic had secured from the Cherokee, and which Dragging Canoe's Chickamauga faction had refused to recognize. The new treaty extended the area for White settlement as far south as the Little Tennessee River, along which the main Overhill Cherokee towns were located. The Cherokee did not formally relinquish their claim to this territory to the U.S. until the July 1791 Treaty of Holston and even then, hostilities continued in the area for years afterward.

=== Drawn-out end ===
The small state began its demise in 1786, with several key residents and supporters of Franklin withdrawing their support in favor of a newly reinterested North Carolina. Until this point, Franklin had not had the benefit of either the federal army or the North Carolina militia. In late 1786, North Carolina offered to waive all back taxes if Franklin would reunite with its government. When this offer was popularly rejected in 1787, North Carolina moved in with troops under the leadership of Col. John Tipton and re-established its own courts, jails, and government at Jonesborough. The two rival administrations now competed side-by-side.

==== Battle of Franklin ====
In 1787, the "Franklinites" continued to expand their territory westward toward the Cumberland Mountains by forcibly stealing land from the Native American populations. The frontier shifted back and forth often throughout the Cherokee–American wars. The September 1787 meeting of the Franklin legislature, however, was its last.

At the end of 1787, loyalties were divided among the area's residents and came to a head in early February 1788. Jonathan Pugh, the North Carolina sheriff of Washington County, was ordered by the county court to seize any property of Sevier's to settle tax debts North Carolina contended were owed to them. The property seized included several slaves, who were brought to Tipton's home and secured in his underground kitchen. On February 27, Governor Sevier arrived at the Tipton house leading a force numbering more than 100 men. During a heavy snowstorm in the early morning of February 29, Colonel George Maxwell arrived with a force equivalent to Sevier's to reinforce Tipton. After 10 minutes of skirmishing, Sevier and his force withdrew to Jonesborough. A number of men were captured or wounded on both sides, and three men were killed.

=== Frontier intrigues ===
In late March 1788, the Chickamauga, Chickasaw, and other tribes collectively began to attack American frontier settlements in Franklin. A desperate Sevier sought a loan from the Spanish government. With help from James White (who was later found to be a paid agent of Spain), he attempted to place Franklin under Spanish rule. Opposed to any foreign nation gaining a foothold in Franklin, North Carolina officials arrested Sevier in August 1788. Sevier's supporters quickly freed him from the local jail and retreated to "Lesser Franklin". In February 1789, Sevier and the last holdouts of the "Lost State" swore oaths of allegiance to North Carolina after turning themselves in. North Carolina sent their militia to aid in driving out the Cherokee and Chickasaw.

=== Lesser Franklin ===
After the dissolution of the State of Franklin in February 1789, continued support of the separate state movement was confined largely to Sevier County, specifically in the country south of the French Broad River. The people there realized that the only entity recognizing title to their land holdings had been Franklin. Both North Carolina and the federal (Confederation) government supported the Cherokee claims as set forth in the Treaty of Hopewell, and considered settlers in the area "squatters". This led to the formation of a "Lesser Franklin" government, with Articles of Association similar to the earlier Watauga Constitution. In 1789, these articles were adopted at Newell's Station, which served as the seat of government for the wider area of Lesser Franklin, including all the settled country south of the French Broad.

The Lesser Franklin government finally ended in 1791, when Governor William Blount, of the newly formed Southwest Territory, met the Cherokee chieftains on the site of the future Knoxville, and they made the Treaty of Holston. The Overhill Cherokee now acknowledged the authority of the United States government, and ceded to the federal government all of their lands south of the French Broad, almost as far as the Little Tennessee River.

== Subsequent status ==
By early 1789, the government of the State of Franklin outside of Lesser Franklin had collapsed entirely and the territory was firmly back under the control of North Carolina. Soon thereafter, North Carolina once again ceded the area to the federal government to form the Southwest Territory, the precursor to the State of Tennessee. Sevier was elected in 1790 to the US Congress to represent the territory, and became Tennessee's first governor, in 1796. Col. John Tipton signed the Tennessee Constitution as the representative from Washington County.

== Notable Franklinites ==
- William Cocke (1748 – August 22, 1828); American lawyer, pioneer, and statesman.
- David "Davy" Crockett (August 17, 1786 – March 6, 1836); famed frontiersman and statesman, born in Greene County, Franklin.
- Samuel Doak (1749–1830); Presbyterian minister, pioneer, founded earliest schools and churches in East Tennessee; delegate to the "Lost State" of Franklin which convened in Greeneville.
- Col. Joseph Hardin (1734–1801); Speaker of the House for the State of Franklin; trustee of Greeneville (now Tusculum) College.
- John Sevier (1745–1815); Governor of Franklin; first governor of Tennessee.
- Lt. Samuel Wear (1753 – April 3, 1817); co-founder of Franklin; veteran of the Revolutionary War, War of 1812, and the Indian wars; fought at the Battle of Kings Mountain.
- Gen. James White (1747 – August 14, 1821); American pioneer and soldier who founded Knoxville, Tennessee.

== Legacy ==
The Washington County farm of Col. John Tipton, where the 1788 Battle of Franklin was fought, has been preserved by the State of Tennessee as the Tipton-Haynes State Historic Site in southeastern Johnson City, Tennessee.

Samuel Tipton, a son of Col. John Tipton, donated land for a town to be located along the east side of the Doe River near its confluence with the Watauga River in what was then known as Wayne County, and the town was named in his honor as Tiptonville (not to be confused with present-day Tiptonville, in West Tennessee). The losers of the Battle of Franklin (1788) later regained political power and renamed Wayne County as Carter County (after the former State of Franklin Senate Speaker Landon Carter), and also renamed Tiptonville as Elizabethton (after the wife of Landon Carter, Elizabeth Carter) when Tennessee was first admitted to the Union in 1796 and John Sevier became the first governor of Tennessee.

The Franklin area also played a role in the Southern Unionist East Tennessee Convention. Throughout the first half of the 19th century, East Tennessee was frequently at odds with Tennessee's two other grand divisions, Middle Tennessee and West Tennessee. Many East Tennesseans felt the state legislature showed persistent favoritism toward the other two divisions, especially over funding for internal improvements. In the early 1840s, several East Tennessee leaders, among them Congressman (and future President) Andrew Johnson, led a movement to form a separate state in East Tennessee known as "Frankland". Though this movement was unsuccessful, the idea that East Tennessee should be a separate state periodically resurfaced over the subsequent two decades.

Many businesses in the State of Franklin use that name to keep the legacy alive, such as the "State of Franklin Bank", based in Johnson City, Tennessee.

One of the main thoroughfares in Johnson City is named "State of Franklin Road" and passes by East Tennessee State University.

In law-school examinations in the U.S., a fictional "State of Franklin" is used as a placeholder name for a generic state, often the one in which the property of Blackacre is located. This way, variations in existing state law do not complicate the theoretical legal issues arising from the property disputes. By convention, Blackacre is located in Acre County, Franklin.

The combined present-day (as of 2015 census) population of the counties that would have made up the State of Franklin is 540,000, which would have made the state have about 40,000 people fewer than Wyoming, the current least-populous state.

== See also ==
- Historic regions of the United States
- Trans-Appalachia
- Westsylvania
- Watauga Association
