= John Tipton (Tennessee frontiersman) =

American politician

- Born: August 15, 1730; Baltimore County, Maryland, United States
- Died: August 9, 1813 (aged 82); Washington County, Tennessee, United States
- Resting place: Tipton-Haynes Cemetery; Johnson City, Tennessee
- Spouse: Mary Butler (m. 1751) Martha Denton Moore (m. 1775)
- Military career
- Allegiance: United States
- Branch: Virginia militia
- Service years: 1774–1782
- Conflicts: Dunmore's War • Battle of Point Pleasant (1774); American Revolutionary War

John Tipton (August 15, 1730 – August 9, 1813) was an American frontiersman and statesman who was active in the early development of the state of Tennessee. He is best remembered for leading the opposition to the State of Franklin movement in the 1780s, as well as for his rivalry with Franklinite leader John Sevier. He served in the legislatures of Virginia, North Carolina, the Southwest Territory, and Tennessee, and was a delegate to Tennessee's 1796 constitutional convention. Tipton's homestead still stands and is managed as the Tipton-Haynes State Historic Site.

== Early life ==
John Tipton was born in 1730 in Baltimore County, Maryland, one of eight children of Jonathan Tipton, a farmer, and Elizabeth (Edwards) Tipton. His ancestors hailed from England, and his paternal grandfather migrated to Maryland from Jamaica. In 1747, his family moved to the Shenandoah Valley, then on Virginia's western frontier.

Tipton married Mary Butler in 1751, and they had nine sons: Samuel, Benjamin, Abraham, William, Isaac, Jacob, John, Thomas and Jonathan. By the late 1750s, Tipton as a young man owned a 181-acre (73 ha) farm along the Shenandoah River in Frederick County, where he raised crops and livestock, and produced whiskey. In 1761, he supported George Washington's campaign for the House of Burgesses.

When Dunmore County (modern Shenandoah County) was created from Frederick in 1772, Tipton was appointed justice of the peace in the new county by Governor Lord Dunmore. In June 1774, Tipton was elected to the county's Committee of Safety and helped craft the Woodstock Resolutions, which denounced the British Crown's actions in closing the port of Boston. He was also elected to the county's seat in the House of Burgesses. During Dunmore's War later that year, Tipton served as a captain under Andrew Lewis and saw action at the Battle of Point Pleasant in October.

In the spring of 1776, Tipton, who had aligned with the growing Patriot cause, represented Dunmore County at the Virginia Conventions. He was elected to the Virginia House of Delegates that year, where he served from 1776 to 1777, and from 1778 to 1781. In 1777, he was reappointed justice of the peace by Governor Patrick Henry. Two years later, he was appointed recruiting officer for the Continental Army's Virginia line. In 1780, he was appointed Commissioner of the Provision of Law by Governor Thomas Jefferson. As principal officer of the Shenandoah militia during the war, he obtained the title of colonel.

During the course of the American Revolution, Tipton suffered a number of personal tragedies. His wife, Mary, died in 1776 while giving birth. He married a widow, Martha (Denton) Moore. His son, Abraham, was killed while fighting under George Rogers Clark. When Tipton and his second wife had a son together, they named him Abraham, for the son who had died. His son, William, was badly wounded during the Siege of Savannah.

== State of Franklin ==
In the 1770s, Tipton's brothers Jonathan and Joseph, along with their aging father, moved to the Tennessee frontier, which at the time was controlled by a fledgling government known as the Watauga Association. Jonathan Tipton (frequently confused with John Tipton by historians) signed the Watauga Petition in 1776 and fought at the Battle of Kings Mountain in 1780. John Tipton followed his brothers to Watauga in 1783 and purchased what is now known as the Tipton-Haynes site in May 1784.

In June 1784, North Carolina ceded its lands west of the Appalachian Mountains (i.e., modern Tennessee) to the Continental Congress. Though the North Carolina legislature rescinded this cession in October, a movement to form a new state (eventually known as the State of Franklin) had already developed and had called for a convention to meet in December. At this convention, a resolution was introduced to move forward with the formation of a new state. Tipton voted against the resolution, but it passed, 28 to 15.

The supporters of the State of Franklin elected John Sevier as governor of the proposed state. Tennessee residents who sought to remain with North Carolina threw their support behind Tipton, electing him to Washington County's seat in the North Carolina Senate in 1786. The Franklinites and loyalists (the latter sometimes called "Tiptonites") set up parallel governments that gradually grew hostile to one another. They raided each other's courthouses and seized each other's court documents. At one point, Tipton and Sevier scuffled in the streets of Jonesborough.

The rivalry between Sevier and Tipton climaxed in late February 1788 in an incident known as the "Battle of Franklin". While Sevier was away campaigning against the Cherokee, Tipton ordered that some of Sevier's slaves be seized for taxes supposedly owed to North Carolina. When Sevier learned what had occurred, he led around 150 militia to Tipton's farm and demanded he return the slaves. Tipton refused, and gunfire was briefly exchanged as Sevier's forces surrounded Tipton's house. Two days after the siege began, a Sullivan County militia loyal to North Carolina arrived on the scene and scattered Sevier's forces. Two of Sevier's sons were captured, and Tipton initially demanded they be hanged. He was persuaded to release them. Following this engagement, the State of Franklin movement largely collapsed.

Tipton attended North Carolina's Hillsboro Convention in March 1788, where he voted against the state's ratification of the newly proposed United States Constitution, arguing the document lacked a Bill of Rights. He was reelected to the state senate later that year.

In July 1788, Governor Samuel Johnston issued a warrant for Sevier's arrest. In October, Sevier was involved in a melee in Jonesborough, and Tipton was notified that he was staying in the home of Mrs. Jacob Brown. Tipton formed a posse and surrounded the Brown home. Mrs. Jacob Brown sat down in the doorway to prevent Tipton from entering, while Sevier stepped out through a side door and surrendered to a more amiable loyalist, Colonel Robert Love. Tipton sent Sevier to North Carolina to stand trial for treason. Upon Sevier's arrival in Morganton, however, he was promptly released.

== Southwest Territory and Tennessee ==
In November 1789, North Carolina ratified the U.S. Constitution and passed a second cession act in December, ceding its trans-Appalachian lands to the new U.S. government. The U.S. government organized the new lands into the Southwest Territory, and William Blount was appointed governor of the new territory.

Upon his arrival in East Tennessee, Blount sought to end the feud between Tipton and Sevier. He initially offered Tipton a position as justice of the peace, but Tipton turned it down. In March 1792, Blount visited Tipton's home and personally convinced him to curtail his enmity toward Sevier. In Blount's presence, Tipton burned a petition that had been circulating to discredit Sevier.

In 1794, Tipton was elected to the territorial legislature, where he served on the Committee for Petitions and Grievances alongside James White and William Cocke. In 1796, Tipton was a delegate from Washington County to the state constitutional convention, which crafted Tennessee's first constitution. That same year, he was elected to the Tennessee Senate, in which he served until 1799. He aligned with rising politician Andrew Jackson and tried to help Jackson and Governor Archibald Roane prove land fraud accusations against Sevier in 1803.

In 1795 and 1796, French botanist André Michaux stayed with Tipton while on a trip to study new plant species on the Appalachian frontier. Tipton spent his later years at his home in Washington County, where he farmed and bred racehorses. He died in August 1813 and was buried in a family plot on his farm.

== Family and legacy ==
Tipton's eldest son, Samuel (1752–1833), is considered the founder of Elizabethton, Tennessee. He deeded the land on which the city was founded in the 1790s as Tiptonville. Tipton's son, Jacob (1765–1791), was killed at St. Clair's Defeat in 1791. He was the second son to die in war. Tipton County, Tennessee, is named in Jacob's honor.

In the early 19th century, Tipton's son, William (1761–1849), known as "Fighting Billy," acquired much of the land in Cades Cove, in the Great Smoky Mountains. Tipton's in-law, Joshua Jobe, convinced John Oliver to become the Cove's first white settler in 1818. The Tipton Place, built by Tipton's descendants in the 1880s, still stands along the Cades Cove Loop Road.

Tipton's great-nephew, John Tipton (1786–1839), fought at the Battle of Tippecanoe in 1811. He was elected by the Indiana state legislature as a U.S. senator in the 1830s. He was a great-grandson of Tipton's uncle, William (1696–1726). Tipton County, Indiana; Tipton, Indiana, and Tipton, Iowa, are all named for him.

Tipton's farm, the Tipton-Haynes Place in Johnson City, is now designated as a state historic site. It is listed on the National Register of Historic Places. When the state acquired the farm in 1945, historian Samuel Cole Williams spoke at its dedication.

For years after Tipton's death, the leader was criticized by historians, most of whom held favorable views of his rival, Sevier. Sevier's early biographer, James B. Gilmore, was particularly hostile toward Tipton, and historian James Phelan, in his 1888 History of Tennessee, describes Tipton as a temperamental and jealous individual who "lacked intellectual force." Later historians, among them Theodore Roosevelt (Winning of the West), gave more nuanced accounts of the Tipton-Sevier feud.
