= Joseph McDowell Jr. =

American politician (1756–1801)

Joseph McDowell, Jr.
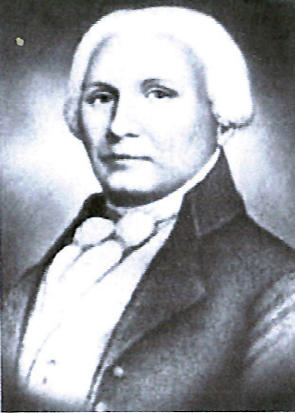
- Joseph McDowell, Jr., US Representative from North Carolina
- Born: February 15, 1756; Winchester, Virginia Colony, British America
- Died: July 11, 1801 (aged 45); Burke County, North Carolina, U.S.
- Burial place: Quaker Meadows Cemetery, Morganton, North Carolina
- Spouse: Margaret Moffett McDowell
- Relatives: BG Charles M. McDowell (brother); Captain Joseph "Pleasant Gardens" McDowell (cousin); Joseph J. McDowell, son
- Military career
- Allegiance: United States of America
- Branch: North Carolina militia
- Service years: 1776–1783
- Rank: Colonel
- Units: 2nd Rowan County Regiment, Burke County Regiment
- Commands: Burke County Regiment

Joseph "Quaker Meadows" McDowell Jr. (February 15, 1756 – July 11, 1801) was an American planter, soldier, and statesman from North Carolina. He was known as "Quaker Meadows Joe" to distinguish him from his cousin Joseph "Pleasant Gardens" McDowell, who was also a legislator and American Revolutionary War officer from North Carolina. The two men are not always clearly distinguished in historical records; both were in the 1780 Battle of Kings Mountain, one as a major in the Burke County Regiment of the North Carolina militia, and the other in a subordinate role as a captain.

== Early life ==
McDowell was born in Winchester in the Virginia Colony on February 15, 1756. His parents were Joseph McDowell Sr. (1715–1771) who was an Ulster Scot immigrant who was a Presbyterian of Scottish descent from Ballycarry, Ireland (in what has since become Northern Ireland and Virginia Margaret O'Neil (1717–1790) who was Catholic from County Cavan, Ireland. The family moved to Rowan County, North Carolina in 1758. Joseph McDowell grew up on his family's estate, "Quaker Meadows", in Rowan County, North Carolina (in the area that became Burke County in 1777).

== Congressional service ==
He was a delegate to the Hillsborough Convention in 1788 and the Fayetteville Convention in 1789 that approved the U.S. Constitution for North Carolina. McDowell served in the 5th United States Congress from 1797 to 1799. He is sometimes credited as also having served in the 3rd United States Congress (1793–1795), but according to the Biographical Directory of the United States Congress, it was his cousin, Joseph "Pleasant Gardens" McDowell, who served at that time. His son Joseph J. McDowell also served in Congress.

== Military service ==
He served in the North Carolina militia during the American Revolution.

- Major in the 2nd Rowan County Regiment of the North Carolina militia (1776–1777)
- Major in the Burke County Regiment of the North Carolina militia (1777–1781)
- Lt. Colonel in the Burke County Regiment of the North Carolina militia (1781–1782)
- Colonel over the Burke County Regiment of the North Carolina militia (1782–1783)

Known engagements that he participated in included:

- April 10–20, 1779 Chickamauga Towns
- June 20, 1779, Battle of Stono Ferry, South Carolina
- July 15, 1780, Earle's Ford, South Carolina
- June 20, 1780, Battle of Ramseur's Mill
- August 18, 1780, Battle of Musgrove's Mill, South Carolina
- September 12, 1780, Battle of Cane Creek/Lindley's Mill
- October 8, 1780, Battle of Kings Mountain, South Carolina
- January 17, 1781, Battle of Cowpens, South Carolina
- 1782, Cherokee Expedition

== Death ==
McDowell died July 11, 1801 in Burke County, North Carolina. He was buried at the Quaker Meadows Cemetery, Morganton, Burke County, North Carolina.

U.S. House of Representatives
| Preceded by James Holland | Member of the U.S. House of Representatives from North Carolina's 1st congressional district 1797–1799 | Succeeded by Joseph Dickson |
