= Battle of Graham's Fort =

1781 battle of the American Revolutionary War

Coordinates: 35.2055°N 81.4864°W

- Part of the American Revolutionary War
| Date | September 1, 1780 |
| Location | Present-day Grover, Cleveland County, North Carolina |
| Result | Patriot victory |

Belligerents
| (Kingdom of Great Britain) Loyalist militia | (United States) Patriot militia |

Commanders and leaders
| (Kingdom of Great Britain) Parker Campbell (WIA) | (United States) William Graham |

Strength
| 24 | 3 |

Casualties and losses
| 1 Killed; 4 wounded | None |

The battle of Graham’s Fort took place on September 1, 1780 between Patriot and Loyalist militias in present day Cleveland County, North Carolina. Colonel William Graham had built a large log cabin near Buffalo Creek, which would eventually be regarded as Graham’s Fort.

On September 1, a group of Loyalists approached the building and demanded that Graham surrender himself. Graham refused and the two groups exchanged fire. One Loyalist approached the structure, placed the muzzle of his gun into a crack and discharged the weapon. Seeing this, a seventeen-year-old woman is said to have pushed her brother down to save him from being shot. The Loyalist was shot in the head. Next, according to legend, the young woman unbolted the door and ran out to retrieve the fallen Loyalist's gun and ammunition for the use of the men in the fort. After losing one man and having four others wounded with no success the Loyalists withdrew. Colonel Graham had his pregnant wife and everyone else in the cabin moved to a safer location. After Graham and those with him withdrew, the Loyalists returned. They plundered the cabin and took six of his slaves. Today, a state historic marker entitled with the name of the battle denotes the site of the engagement. This was the smallest battle fought during the American Revolutionary War.
