= Evan Shelby Alexander =

American politician

Evan Shelby Alexander (c. 1767–October 28, 1809) was a slave owner, lawyer, legislator from the Salisbury District of North Carolina, and United States Democratic-Republican Party congressman from North Carolina between 1806 and 1809.

== Life story ==
Born in Mecklenburg County, North Carolina to his father, a Revolutionary War officer and slave owner around 1767, Alexander attended the common schools and then Princeton College, graduating in 1787, and was a member of the Whig society (later the Whig-Clio), and delivered a commencement address in Greek. He studied law and was admitted to the bar, practicing in Salisbury.

Alexander was elected to the North Carolina House of Commons from the Salisbury District, serving from 1796 to 1803, and was a trustee of the University of North Carolina at Chapel Hill from 1799 to 1809.

Following the resignation of Rep. Nathaniel Alexander, his cousin, Evan Shelby Alexander was chosen in a special election to fill the vacancy; he was elected to a term in regular Congressional elections in 1806, serving in the 9th and 10th Congresses and serving from February 24, 1806 to March 3, 1809. He died shortly after leaving Congress, on October 28, 1809.

U.S. House of Representatives
Preceded by Nathaniel Alexander	Member of the U.S. House of Representatives from North Carolina's 10th congressional district 1806–1809	Succeeded by Joseph Pearson
