= Tryon Resolves =

Declaration of resistance to British colonial policies

What is known today as the Tryon Resolves (entitled at the time the Tryon Declaration of Rights and Independence from British Tyranny) was a brief declaration adopted and signed by "subscribers" to the Tryon County Association that was formed in Tryon County, North Carolina in the early days of the American Revolution. In the Resolves—a modern name for the Association's charter document—the county representatives vowed resistance to the increasingly coercive actions being enacted by the government of Great Britain against its North American colonies. The document was signed on August 14, 1775, but—like other similar declarations of the time—stopped short of calling for total independence from Britain.

== Background ==
The "Tryon Association" was formed with the signing of the Tryon Declaration of Rights and Independence from British Tyranny. (This document only became known as "The Tryon Resolves" in the 20th-century.) The Association was formed in response to the April 19, 1775, Battle of Lexington. The Resolves was among the earliest of many local colonial declarations against the coercive policies that the British government had instituted in the colonies that were considered oppressive by the colonists. Other similar associations with signed "declarations" from the same period included the Mecklenburg Resolves (adopted in nearby Mecklenburg County, North Carolina) and the Suffolk Resolves (adopted in Suffolk County, Massachusetts). The Tryon Resolves predated the United States Declaration of Independence by almost 11 months, but stopped short of proscribing independence from Britain, instead supporting armed resistance until a resolution with England could be made.

As tensions between the North American colonies and the British government continued to increase, county residents began forming Committees of Safety to prepare militia companies for a potential war. On September 14, 1775, many of the signers of the Tryon Resolves formed the Tryon County Militia in preparation for British retaliation against American revolutionaries.

== Text summary and effect ==
In the Tryon Resolves:

- The county residents refer to "the painful necessity of having recourse to arms in defense of our National freedom and constitutional rights, against all invasions;
- Vow to take up arms and risk our lives and our fortunes in maintaining the freedom of our country..."
- The colonists declare they will continue to follow the Continental Congress or Provincial Conventions in defiance of British declarations that these were illegal;
- The signers warn that force will be met with force until such a time as a "reconciliation" can be made between the colonies and Britain.

== Signers ==
The "subscribers" (signatories) to the Tryon Association in alphabetical order were :

- Robt. Alexander
- Jas. Baird
- Abel Beatty
- Thomas Beatty
- John Beeman
- George Black
- James Buchanan
- Christian Carpenter
- Samuel Carpenter
- James Coburn
- Jacob Costner
- Geo. Dellinger
- John Dellinger
- Thomas Espey
- Jacob Forney
- William Graham
- Frederick Hambright
- Andrew Hampton
- Benjamin Hardin
- Joseph Hardin
- Robert Hulclip (Note: The original document suffers from several transcription errors. Most notably affected is the signature of "Robert Hazelip," (aged 16 at the time), transcribed as "Hulclip." A transcription error due to an ink stain early-on has caused this name to be mis-read through history. The misprint was carried over to the original D.A.R. plaque and has been repeatedly copied since.))
- David Jenkins
- Joseph Kuykendall
- Samuel Loftin
- Jas. Logan
- Perrygren Mackness (or Magness)
- Jacob Mauney, Jun.
- Valentine Mauney
- Fried Mauser
- James McAfee
- Charles McLean
- Jas. Miller
- Moses Moore
- John Morris
- Andrew Neel
- Joseph Neel
- George Paris
- Jonathan Price
- John Robison
- Peter Sides
- Adam Simms
- Samuel Smith
- William Thompson
- Joab Turner
- Richard Waffer
- John Walker
- John Wells
- Davis Whiteside
- William Whiteside

== See also ==
- Watauga Association
- Liberty Point Resolves
