= William Graham (colonel) =

American Revolution commander

- Born: 1742; Augusta County, Colony of Virginia
- Died: May 3, 1835 (aged 92–93); Boiling Springs, US
- Burial place: Twitty-Graham Cemetery, Boiling Springs, North Carolina
- Spouse: Susannah Beller Twitty
- Children: Sarah (Graham) Irvine
- Military career
- Allegiance: United States
- Branch: North Carolina militia
- Service years: 1775–1781
- Rank: Colonel
- Units: Tryon County Regiment, Lincoln County Regiment
- Commands: Tryon County Regiment, Lincoln County Regiment
- Conflicts: Battle of Moore's Creek Bridge; Cherokee Expedition; Battle of Graham's Fort

Colonel William Graham (1742 – 1835) was commander of the Tryon County and Lincoln County Regiments of the North Carolina militia and political leader from North Carolina during the American Revolution.

== Early life ==
William Graham was born in 1742 in Augusta County, Colony of Virginia. He was the son of Archibald Graham of Scotland. The younger Graham moved to the Province of North Carolina several years before the American Revolutionary War. There he was one of forty signers of the Tryon Resolves. In 1776, he served as a delegate from the extinct Tryon County, North Carolina to the 3rd and 5th North Carolina Provincial Congress. After Tryon County was dissolved in 1779, he lived in Lincoln and Cleveland Counties.

He married the widow Susannah (Beller) Twitty before 1780.

== Military service ==
He served as a colonel and commandant over two regiments in the North Carolina militia from 1775 to 1781:

- Colonel over the Tryon County Regiment of the North Carolina militia (1775–1779), This regiment became the Lincoln County Regiment after Tryon County was dissolved.
- Colonel over the Lincoln County Regiment of the North Carolina militia (1779–1781)

As a colonel of militia, he served under General Griffith Rutherford of the Salisbury District Brigade. He was part of the successful Light Horse expedition against the Cherokee in 1776.

In 1780, he missed the Battle of Ramseur's Mill. That same year Graham marched with his troops in the expedition that led to the famous Battle of Kings Mountain, but again due to an illness in his family, he was not with his men when the battle was fought. Colonel Joseph Dickson took his place.

He did participate in skirmishes at Thicketty Fort, South Carolina on July 26, 1780; Wofford's Iron Works, South Carolina on August 8, 1780; and Graham's Fort (his) in September of 1780.

William Graham was the oldest Colonel in the frontier parts of western North Carolina. He was involved in the selection of localities for Forts, which had to be erected and provided with a garrison. He directed the forts at Waddleboro, Earles White Oak, Russells and Botts. He received information about threats from spies that reported to him.

== Death ==
He was residing in Rutherford County, North Carolina in October 1832. He died on May 3, 1835. Graham was buried at the Twitty-Graham Cemetery, Boiling Springs, Cleveland County, North Carolina.
