= Tryon County Regiment (North Carolina) =

American colonial military unit

- Active: 1775-1779
- Allegiance: North Carolina
- Branch: North Carolina militia
- Type: Militia
- Part of: Brigade

Commanders
- Notable commanders: Col. William Graham; Col. John Walker; Col. Thomas Beattie

== History ==
The Tryon County Regiment was authorized on August 14, 1775 by the Province of North Carolina Congress. It was subordinate to the Salisbury District Brigade of militia. The regiment was engaged in battles and skirmishes against the British during the American Revolution in North Carolina, South Carolina and Tennessee between 1775 and 1778. It was disbanded on February 8, 1779 and split into the newly created Lincoln and Rutherford County regiments.

== See also ==
- Tryon County, North Carolina
- List of American Revolutionary War battles
- Salisbury District Brigade
- Southern Campaigns: Pension Transactions for a description of the transcription effort by Will Graves
- Southern theater of the American Revolutionary War

== Bibliography ==
- Arthur, John Preston (1914). Western North Carolina; a history (1730-1913). National Society Daughters of the American Revolution of North Carolina. Edward Buncombe Chapter, Asheville, North Carolina.
- Hunter, C.L. (1877). Sketches of western North Carolina, historical and biographical : illustrating principally the Revolutionary period of Mecklenburg, Rowan, Lincoln, and adjoining counties, accompanied with miscellaneous information, much of it never before published. Raleigh: Raleigh News Steam Job Print. p. 166-183.
