= Tryon County, North Carolina =

Historic county of North Carolina

Coordinates: 35.338°N 81.321°W

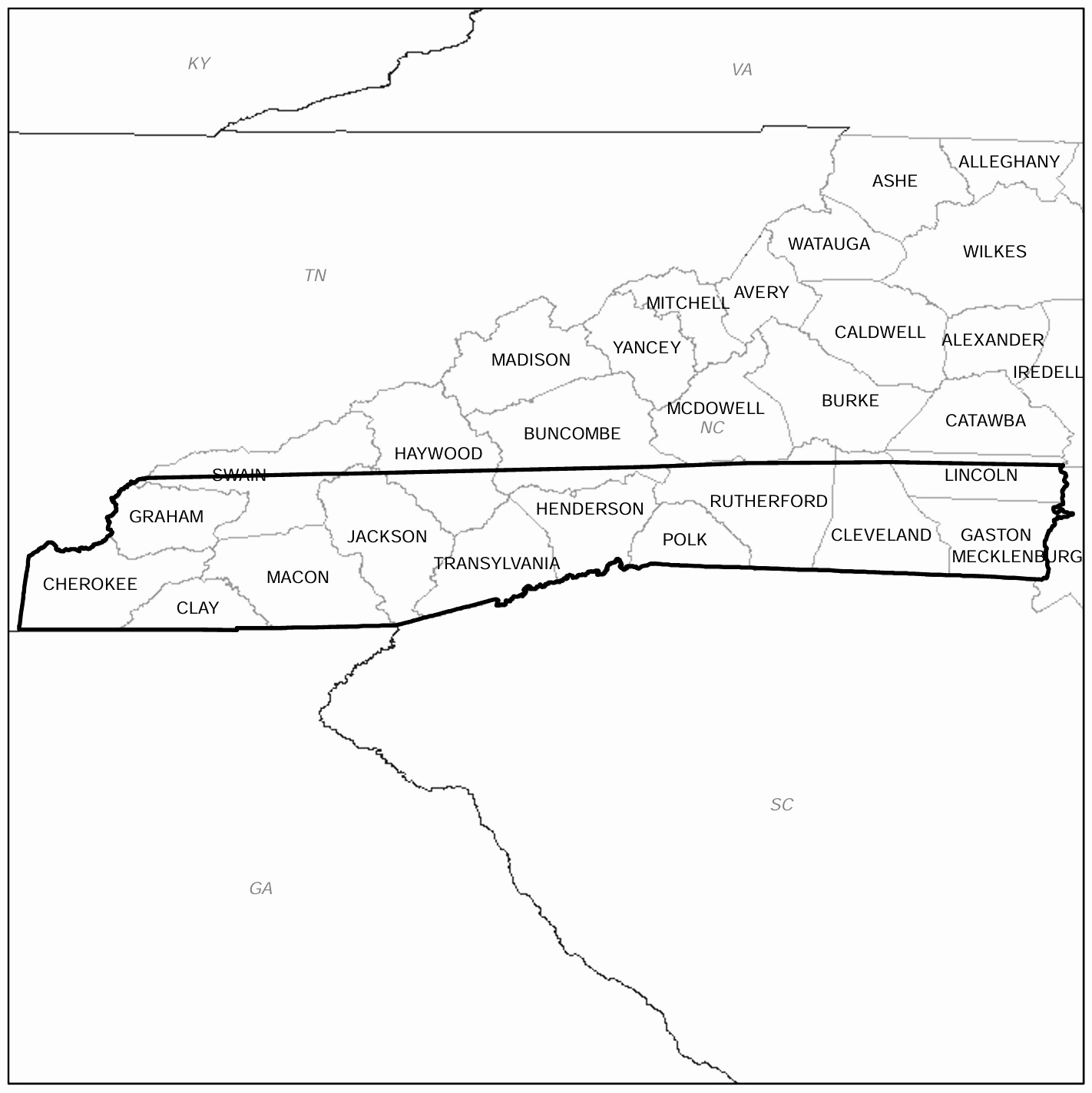
Tryon County (1769–1779), from Newberry Library's Atlas of Historical County Boundaries

Tryon County is a former county which was located in the U.S. state of North Carolina. It was formed in 1768 from the part of Mecklenburg County west of the Catawba River, although the legislative act that created it did not become effective until April 10, 1769. Due to inaccurate and delayed surveying, Tryon County encompassed a large area of northwestern South Carolina. It was named for William Tryon, governor of the North Carolina Colony from 1765 to 1771.

The county seat, finally designated in 1774, was located eight miles southwest of the present-day community of Lincolnton, in Lincoln County.

== History ==
The act establishing the county named commissioners to select a place "whereon to erect court house, prison and stocks." The initial court records beginning with the April 1769 sessions were recorded by Ezekiel Polk, clerk, and the grandfather of James K. Polk, 11th president of the United States.

In 1771 Governor Tryon called out five militiamen of Tryon County to help put down the Regulator Movement, a protest against corrupt county officials and excessive taxes, centered in counties to the northeast of Tryon. Although the colony was officially at peace with the Indians from 1763 to 1776, the Tryon County frontier was the target of occasional raids, usually by Cherokee, but sometimes by Shawnee and other faraway tribes. Settlers constructed several stockade forts to protect themselves and their neighbors: Fort McGaughey was near Brittain Church; Fort McFadden was on Mountain Creek near Rutherfordton; and Potts' Fort in Montfords Cove.

It was not until 1774 that any county buildings were planned or even constructed, using appointed residents' houses for county activities in the interim. The commissioners (appointed by an Act of Assembly to select the place whereon to erect and build the court-house, prison and stocks of Tryon County, on 26 July 1774) reported their selection of the place: "..called 'the crossroads' , on Christian Mauney's land, between the heads of Long Creek, Muddy Creek, and Beaver Dam Creek in the county aforesaid as most central and convenient for the purpose aforesaid." The county court then adjourned to immediately re-meet at Mauney's. The site of the old Tryon courthouse is eight miles southwest of Lincolnton, Lincoln County, North Carolina colony. The October Sessions of 1774, were also held at the house of Mauney, and a room in his dwelling was designated as county jail.

When the British-allied Cherokee attacked several settlements in the county early in the American War for Independence (1776), most Tories joined with their Whig neighbors in fighting off the raiders. General Griffith Rutherford then led a punitive expedition to devastate the Overhill Cherokee towns across the Blue Ridge Mountains.

Following the Battle of Lexington in Massachusetts, 49 county residents gathered at the courthouse and issued the Tryon Resolves, a declaration of resistance to coercive actions by the British Empire against its North American colonies. Although not a statement of independence, the Tryon Resolves were among the earliest of many local colonial declarations which called for the redress of perceived wrongs inflicted on the colonies from the British Parliament and The Crown. The document was signed on August 14, 1775, predating the United States Declaration of Independence by almost 11 months.

Earlier in the decade, Tryon residents had formed a Committee of Safety to provide security for the settlers in the area. Now, the committee had to prepare for a potential war. As tensions between the North American colonies and the British government further increased, the committeemen, all signers of "The Resolves," gathered the following month (on September 14, 1775). At that time they formed the Tryon County, North Carolina militia in preparation for British retaliation against American resistance.

In 1779, Tryon County was divided into Lincoln and Rutherford Counties in North Carolina, and ceased to exist.

== Geography ==
In December 1768, Governor Tryon described the area in a letter as:

"...forty-five miles in breadth due north and south and eighty miles due east and west—it having been found to be that distance from the Catawba River to the western frontier line which was run last year between the Cherokee hunting grounds and this Province."

The original area of Tryon County encompassed the following modern day areas: The entire areas of:

- Cleveland County, North Carolina, including Kings Mountain
- Gaston County, North Carolina
- Lincoln County, including Ramsour's Mill
- Rutherford County, North Carolina
- Cherokee County, South Carolina
- Chester County, South Carolina
- Laurens County, South Carolina
- Spartanburg County, South Carolina
- Union County, South Carolina
- York County, South Carolina

...and parts of:

- Burke County, North Carolina
- McDowell County, North Carolina
- Greenville County, South Carolina
- Newberry County, South Carolina
- The Catawba Indian Reservation

== Notable people ==
- William Graham, militia and political leader during the War for Independence.
- Frederick Hambright, "Resolves" signer and militia leader wounded during the War for Independence.
- Joseph Hardin, "Resolves" signer, militia leader during the War for Independence, and later a legislative representative for the State of Franklin and the Southwest Territory.

== See also ==
- List of former United States counties
- List of North Carolina counties
