= Battle of Kings Mountain =

1780 battle of the American Revolutionary War

- Part of the Southern theater of the American Revolutionary War
- Patrick Ferguson (center) being shot and injured at the battle
Date	October 7, 1780
Location	York/Cherokee Counties, South Carolina 35°8′33″N 81°22′50″W
Result	American victory

Belligerents
United States	Great Britain

Commanders and leaders
William Campbell; Benjamin Cleveland; Isaac Shelby; John Sevier; James Johnston; Frederick Hambright; Joseph McDowell; James Williams †; Joseph Winston	Patrick Ferguson †; Abraham de Peyster (surrendered)

Strength
910	1,125

Casualties and losses
28 killed 62 wounded	157 killed 163 wounded 668 captured
- Location within South Carolina

The Battle of Kings Mountain was fought on October 7, 1780, in South Carolina during the Southern theater of the American Revolutionary War. Fought almost entirely between Patriot and Loyalist troops, the battle resulted in a decisive Patriot victory. Taking place 9 miles (14 km) south of the present-day town of Kings Mountain, North Carolina in what is now rural Cherokee County, South Carolina, the battle has been described as "the war's largest all-American fight."

Major Patrick Ferguson had arrived in North Carolina in mid-1780 to recruit Loyalist troops and protect the flank of a British army under Lieutenant-general Lord Cornwallis. Ferguson challenged Patriot militias to lay down their arms or suffer the consequences. In response, a Patriot militia known as the Overmountain Men, led by Benjamin Cleveland, James Johnston, William Campbell, John Sevier, Joseph McDowell Jr., and Isaac Shelby, rallied to attack Ferguson and his forces. Receiving intelligence on the oncoming attack, Ferguson decided to retreat to the safety of Cornwallis's army. However, the Patriots caught up with his army at Kings Mountain near the border with South Carolina.

Achieving a complete surprise, the Patriot militiamen surrounded and attacked the Loyalists, inflicting severe casualties. After an hour of battle, Ferguson was fatally shot off his horse while trying to break the Patriot line, after which his men surrendered. Some Patriots gave no quarter until their officers re-established control over their men; they were said to be seeking revenge for alleged killings by Banastre Tarleton's British Legion at the Battle of Waxhaws, under the slogan "Remember Tarleton's Quarter." Although victorious, the Patriots had to retreat quickly from the area for fear of Cornwallis's advance. Later they executed nine Loyalist prisoners after a short trial.

The battle was a pivotal event in the southern campaign. The surprising victory of the American Patriot militia over the Loyalists came after a string of Patriot defeats at the hands of Cornwallis and greatly raised the Patriots' morale. With Ferguson dead and his Loyalist militia destroyed, Cornwallis transferred his army into North Carolina and eventually Virginia.

== Prelude ==
British Major Patrick Ferguson was appointed Inspector of Militia on May 22, 1780. His task was to march to the old Tryon County area, raise and organize Loyalist units from the Tory population of the Carolina backcountry, and protect the left flank of Lord Cornwallis' main body at Charlotte, North Carolina.

=== Battle of Musgrove's Mill ===
On the morning of August 18, 1780, 200 mounted Patriot partisans under joint command of Colonels Isaac Shelby, James Williams, and Elijah Clarke prepared to raid a Loyalist camp at Musgrove's Mill, which controlled the local grain supply and guarded a ford of the Enoree River. The Battle of Musgrove Mill occurred on August 19 near the ford. The Patriots anticipated surprising a garrison of about an equal number of Loyalists, but a local farmer informed them that the Tories had recently been reinforced by about 100 Loyalist militia and 200 provincial regulars on their way to join Ferguson. The battle took perhaps an hour; within that period, 63 Tories were killed, an unknown number wounded, and 70 were taken prisoner. The Patriots lost about four dead and twelve wounded.

Some Patriot leaders briefly considered attacking the Loyalist stronghold at Ninety Six, South Carolina; but they hurriedly dispersed after learning that a large Patriot army had been defeated at Camden three days prior.

=== Pursuit of Shelby ===
Shelby's forces covered 60 miles with Ferguson in hot pursuit before making their escape. In the wake of General Horatio Gates' blundering defeat at Camden, the victory at Musgrove Mill heartened the Patriots and served as further evidence that the South Carolina backcountry could not be held by the Tories.

Shelby and his men crossed over the Appalachian Mountains and retreated back into the territory of the Watauga Association at Sycamore Shoals in present-day Elizabethton, Tennessee. On September 2, Ferguson and his militia marched west in pursuit of Shelby toward the Appalachian Mountain hill country on what is now the Tennessee/North Carolina border. By September 10, Ferguson had established a base camp at Gilbert Town, North Carolina. Decades later, Shelby claimed Ferguson issued a challenge to the Patriot leaders to lay down their arms or he would "lay waste to their country with fire and sword." However, it is unlikely any such message was sent. Shelby and Colonel John Sevier met at Sycamore Shoals and agreed to lead their militiamen against him.

=== Muster at Sycamore Shoals ===
Patriot leaders sent word to Virginia militia leader William Campbell, asking him to join them at Sycamore Shoals. Campbell called on Benjamin Cleveland to bring his Wilkes County, North Carolina, militia to the rendezvous. The detachments of Shelby, Sevier, and Campbell were met by 160 North Carolina militiamen led by Charles McDowell and his brother Joseph. Campbell's cousin, Arthur Campbell, brought 200 more Virginians. About 1,100 volunteers from southwest Virginia and today's northeast Tennessee, known as the "Overmountain Men" because they had settled into the wilderness west of the Appalachian Mountains ridgeline, mustered at the rendezvous on September 25, 1780, at Sycamore Shoals. Their movement had been made possible by easing tensions with the Cherokee, thanks to diplomacy by Benjamin Cleveland's brother-in-law, Indian agent Joseph Martin. The Overmountain Men crossed Roan Mountain and proceeded in a southerly direction for about 13 days in anticipation of fighting the Loyalist forces. By September 30, they had reached Quaker Meadows in Burke County, North Carolina, the home of the McDowell brothers, where they united with Cleveland and 350 men. Now 1,400 strong, the Patriots marched to South Mountain, North Carolina. The five colonels leading the Patriot force (Shelby, Sevier, William Campbell, Joseph McDowell and Cleveland) chose William Campbell as the nominal commander, but they agreed that all five would act in council to command their combined army.

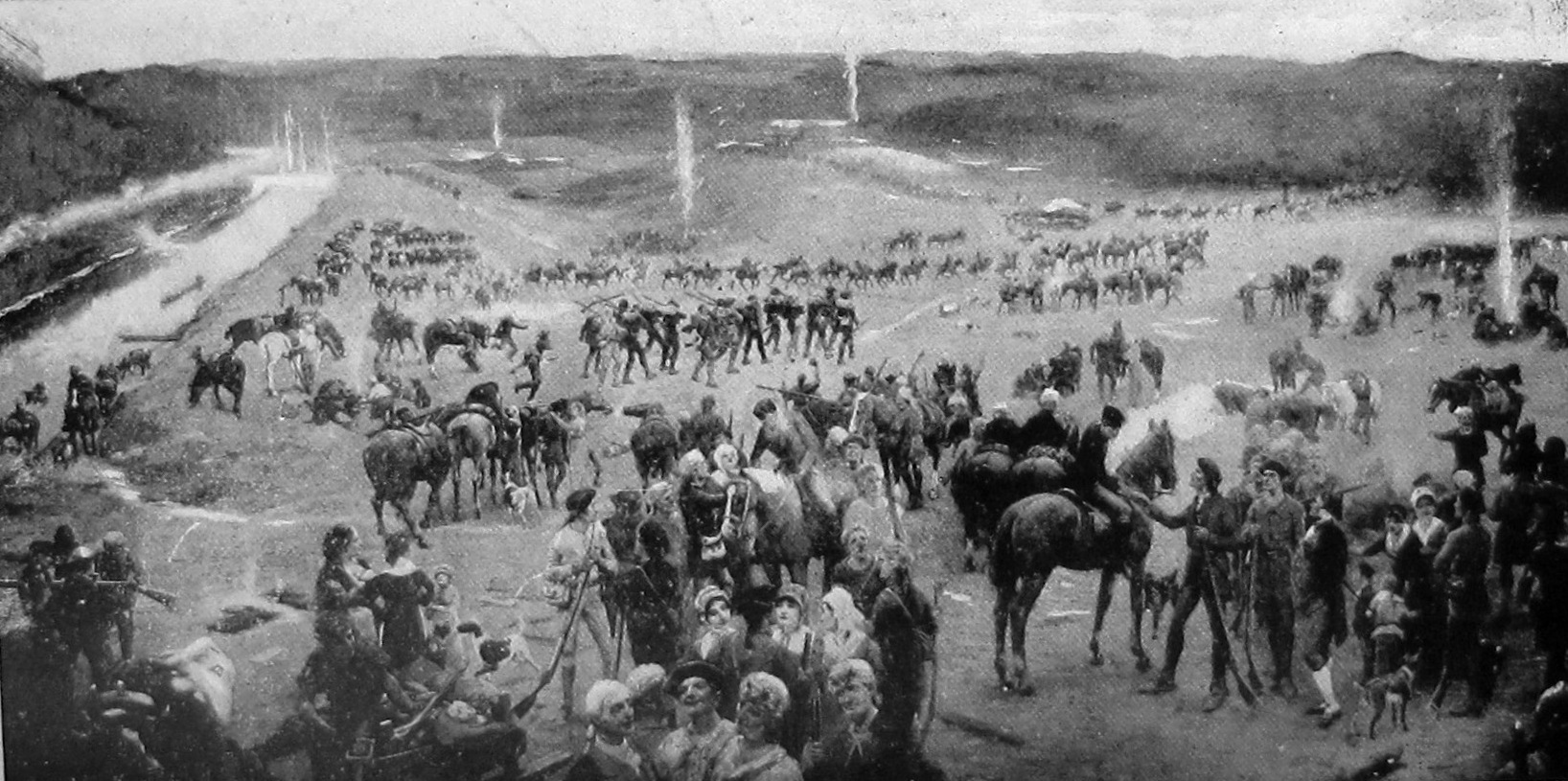
Gathering of Overmountain Men at Sycamore Shoals, a black and white reproduction of Lloyd Branson's 1915 depiction of the Patriot militias joining up

Meanwhile, two deserters from the Patriot militia reached Ferguson and informed him of the large body of militia advancing towards him. Waiting three days for reasons that are unclear, Ferguson ordered a retreat to Cornwallis and the British main forces in Charlotte, sending a message to Cornwallis requesting reinforcements. The request did not reach Cornwallis until one day after the battle. On October 1, Ferguson reached the Broad River where he issued another pugnacious public letter, calling the local militia to join him lest they be "pissed upon by a set of mongrels" (the Overmountain Men).

On October 4, the Patriot militia reached Ferguson's former camp at Gilbert Town, finding it deserted. There 30 Georgia militiamen joined them, anxious for action. On October 6, they reached Cowpens, South Carolina, where they received word that Ferguson was east of them, heading towards Charlotte and Cornwallis. They hurried to catch him. Patriot spies reported Ferguson was making camp on Kings Mountain with some 1,200 men. Ferguson, rather than pushing on until he reached Charlotte and safety (just a day's march away), camped at Kings Mountain and sent Cornwallis another letter asking for reinforcements. Kings Mountain is one of many rocky forested hills in the upper Piedmont, near the border between North and South Carolina. It is shaped like a footprint with the highest point at the heel, a narrow instep, and a broad rounded toe. The Loyalists camped on a ridge west of Kings Pinnacle, the highest point on Kings Mountain.

Needing to hurry, the Patriot militia put 900 men on horseback and rode for Kings Mountain. They left immediately, marching through the night of October 6 and morning of October 7, even though the rain never stopped. By sunrise they forded the Broad River, 15 miles from Kings Mountain. By early afternoon they arrived and immediately surrounded the ridge and attacked.

== Battle ==
Kings Mountain battle layout

The battle opened about 3 p.m., when the 900 Patriots (including John Crockett, father of Davy Crockett) approached the steep base of the western ridge. They formed eight detachments of 100 to 200 men each. Ferguson was unaware that the Patriots had caught up to him and his 1,100 men. He was the only regular British soldier in the command, composed entirely of Loyalist Carolina militia, except for the 100 or so red-uniformed Provincials (enlisted colonials) from New York, New Jersey, and Connecticut. He had not thought it necessary to fortify his camp.

The Patriots caught the Loyalists by surprise. Loyalist officer Alexander Chesney later wrote he did not know the Patriots were anywhere near them until the shooting started. As the screaming Patriots charged up the hill, Dutch-American Loyalist Captain Abraham de Peyster turned to Ferguson and said, "These things are ominous – these are the damned yelling boys!" Two parties, led by Sevier and Campbell, assaulted the mountain's "heel"—the smallest in area but its highest point. The other detachments, led by Shelby, Williams, Lacey, Cleveland, Hambright, Winston and McDowell, attacked the main Loyalist position, surrounding the base beside the crest.

No one in the Patriot army held command once the fighting started. Each detachment fought independently under the previously agreed-to plan to surround and destroy the Loyalists. The Patriots crept up the hill and fired from behind rocks and trees. Ferguson rallied his troops and launched a desperate bayonet charge against Campbell and Sevier. Lacking bayonets, the Patriots ran down the hill and into the woods. Campbell soon rallied his troops, returned to the hill, and resumed firing. Ferguson ordered two more bayonet charges during the battle. This became the pattern of the battle; the Patriots would charge up the hill, then the Tories would charge down the hill with fixed bayonets, driving the Patriots off the slopes and into the woods. Once the charge was spent and the Tories returned to their positions, the Patriots would reform in the woods, return to the base of the hill, and charge up the hill again. During one of the charges, Williams was killed, and McDowell was wounded. Firing was difficult for the Loyalists, since the Patriots constantly moved using cover and concealment to their advantage. Furthermore, the downhill angle of the hill contributed to the Loyalists overshooting their marks.

After an hour of combat, Loyalist casualties were heavy. Ferguson rode back and forth across the hill, blowing a silver whistle he used to signal charges. Shelby, Sevier, and Campbell reached the top of the hill behind the Loyalist position and attacked Ferguson's rear. The Loyalists were driven back into their camp, where they began to surrender. Ferguson drew his sword and hacked down any small white flags that he saw popping up, but he appeared to know that the end was near. In an attempt to rally his faltering men, Ferguson shouted out "Hurrah, brave boys, the day is ours!" He gathered a few officers together and tried to cut through the Patriot ring, but Sevier's men fired a volley and Ferguson was shot and dragged by his horse behind the Patriot line. There he was confronted by an opposing Patriot officer, who demanded a surrender from the major. Ferguson shot and killed the man with his pistol in a final act of defiance but was immediately shot dead by multiple Patriots on the spot. When the Patriots recovered his corpse, they counted seven bullet wounds.

Seeing their leader fall, the Loyalists began to surrender. Some Patriots were seemingly unaware that the Loyalists were trying to surrender. Some did not want to take prisoners as they were eager to avenge the Battle of Waxhaws in which Banastre Tarleton's forces killed a number of Continental soldiers under Abraham Buford after a number of Patriots had raised the white flag of surrender. (At the battle of the Waxhaws, Tarleton's horse was shot about the same time a number of Patriots were attempting to surrender, pinning him to the ground and leading his men to believe their commanding officer had been killed under a white flag of surrender.)

Loyalist Captain de Peyster, in command after Ferguson was killed, sent out an emissary with a white flag, asking for quarter. For several minutes, the Patriots rejected de Peyster's white flag and continued firing, many of them shouting, "Give 'em Tarleton's Quarter!" and "Give them Buford's play!" A significant number of the surrendering Loyalists were killed or wounded including the white flag emissary. When de Peyster sent out a second white flag, a few of the Patriot officers, including Campbell and Sevier, ran forward and took control by ordering their men to cease fire. They took around 668 Loyalist prisoners.

== Aftermath ==
The Battle of Kings Mountain lasted 65 minutes. The Loyalists suffered 157 killed, 163 wounded, and 698 taken prisoner. The Patriot militia suffered 28 killed and 62 wounded. The Patriots had to move out quickly for fear that Cornwallis would advance to meet them. Loyalist prisoners well enough to walk were herded to camps several miles from the battlefield. The dead were buried in shallow graves, and wounded were left on the field to die. Ferguson's corpse was later reported to have been desecrated and wrapped in oxhide before burial. Both victors and captives came near to starvation on the march due to a lack of supplies in the hastily organized Patriot army.

On October 20, the retreating Patriot force held drumhead courts-martial of Loyalists on various charges (treason, desertion from Patriot militias, incitement of Indian rebellion). Passing through the Sunshine community in what is now Rutherford County, North Carolina, the retreat halted on the property of the Biggerstaff family. Aaron Biggerstaff, a Loyalist, had fought in the battle and had been mortally wounded. His brother Benjamin was a Patriot and was being held as a prisoner-of-war on a British ship docked at Charleston, South Carolina. Their cousin John Moore was the Loyalist commander at the earlier Battle of Ramsour's Mill (modern Lincolnton, North Carolina) in which many of the combatants at Kings Mountain had participated on one side or the other. While stopped on the Biggerstaff land, the American Patriots convicted 36 Loyalist prisoners. Some were testified against by Patriots who had previously fought alongside them and later changed sides. Nine of the prisoners were hanged before Isaac Shelby brought an end to the proceedings. Many of the Patriots dispersed over the next few days while all but 130 of the Loyalist prisoners escaped while being led in single file through woodlands. The column finally made camp at Bethabara, North Carolina.

Lieutenant Anthony Allaire, a New York Loyalist attached to Ferguson's unit, was captured at the battle and endured the forced march and mistreatment of prisoners. He eventually escaped and was able to make his way back to British forces in Charleston. His published diary gives an account of the months leading up to the battle, a brief account of the battle, his time as a prisoner of Patriot forces, and his eventual escape.

Kings Mountain was a pivotal moment in the history of the American Revolution. Coming after a series of disasters and humiliations in the Carolinas—the fall of Charleston and capture of the American army there, the destruction of another American army at the Battle of Camden, and Beuford's defeat at the Waxhaws—the surprising decisive victory at Kings Mountain was a great boost to Patriot morale. The Tories of the Carolina backcountry were broken as a military force. Additionally, the destruction of Ferguson's command and the looming threat of Patriot militia in the mountains caused Cornwallis to cancel his plans to invade North Carolina. He instead evacuated Charlotte and retreated to South Carolina. He would not return to North Carolina until early 1781, when he was chasing Nathanael Greene after the Americans had dealt British forces another defeat at the Battle of Cowpens.

In The Winning of the West, Theodore Roosevelt writes of Kings Mountain, "This brilliant victory marked the turning point of the American Revolution." Thomas Jefferson called it "The turn of the tide of success." President Herbert Hoover at Kings Mountain said,

This is a place of inspiring memories. Here less than a thousand men, inspired by the urge of freedom, defeated a superior force entrenched in this strategic position. This small band of Patriots turned back a dangerous invasion well designed to separate and dismember the united Colonies. It was a little army and a little battle, but it was of mighty portent. History has done scant justice to its significance, which rightly should place it beside Lexington, Bunker Hill, Trenton, and Yorktown.

In 1931, the Congress of the United States created the Kings Mountain National Military Park at the site of the battle. The park headquarters is in Blacksburg, South Carolina, and hosts hundreds of thousands of people each year.

== See also ==
- List of American Revolutionary War battles
- American Revolutionary War § War in the South. Places the Battle of Kings Mountain in overall sequence and strategic context.

== Notes ==
=== Sources ===
- Allen, Thomas B. (2010). Tories: Fighting for the King in America's First Civil War. New York: Harper Collins, Inc. ISBN 9780061241819.
- Buchanan, John (1997). The Road To Guilford Court House: The American Revolution in the Carolinas. New York: John Wiley & Sons. ISBN 0471327166.
- Dameron, J. David (2003). Kings Mountain: The Defeat of the Loyalists, October 7, 1780. Cambridge, Massachusetts: Da Capo Press. ISBN 0306811944.
- Draper, Lyman C. (1881). Kings Mountain and Its Heroes.
- Gilbert, Ed; Gilbert, Catherine (2016). Cowpens 1781: Turning point of the American Revolution. Bloomsbury Publishing. ISBN 9781472807465.
- Hibbert, Christopher (1990). Redcoats and Rebels: The war for America 1770–1781. New York: Norton/Grafton. ISBN 039302895X.
- Kirkland, Thomas J.; Kennedy, Robert M. (1905). Historic Camden. Columbia, South Carolina: The State Printing Company.
- Wallace, Willard (1964). Appeal to Arms: A Military History of the American Revolution. Chicago: Quadrangle.
