= National Register of Historic Places listings in McDowell County, North Carolina =

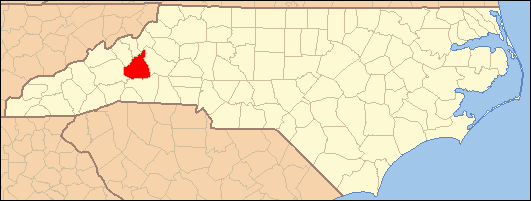
Map of North Carolina with McDowell County highlighted

This list includes properties and districts listed on the National Register of Historic Places in McDowell County, North Carolina. Click the "Map of all coordinates" link to the right to view an online map of all properties and districts with latitude and longitude coordinates in the table below.

== Current listings ==
This National Park Service list is complete through NPS recent listings posted March 14, 2025.

	Name on the Register	Image	Date listed	Location	City or town	Description
1	Welsford Parker Artz House	Welsford Parker Artz House	August 23, 1990 (#90001311)	205 Maple St. 35°37′54″N 82°10′45″W	Old Fort	
2	Henry Seawell Brown and Mary Jane English Farmstead	Henry Seawell Brown and Mary Jane English Farmstead	September 3, 2009 (#09000685)	15956 U.S. Route 221 North; 35°51′57″N 81°57′13″W	Ashford	
3	Carson House	Carson House	September 15, 1970 (#70000843)	West of Marion on U.S. Route 70; 35°41′27″N 82°03′25″W	Marion	
4	Carson-Young House	Carson-Young House	July 28, 2011 (#11000483)	842 Major Conley Rd. 35°42′25″N 82°03′16″W	Marion	
5	Clinchfield Manufacturing Company Mill No. 2		April 23, 2024 (#100010164)	56 Branch Street; 35°41′38″N 81°59′36″W	Marion	
6	Depot Historic District	Depot Historic District	March 28, 1991 (#91000293)	Southeastern end of Depot St., bounded on the south by the Southern railroad tracks, and 111 Railroad St., south of the tracks 35°40′52″N 82°00′38″W	Marion	
7	First Presbyterian Church	First Presbyterian Church	March 28, 1991 (#91000291)	12 W. Fort St. 35°41′03″N 82°00′46″W	Marion	
8	Albertus Ledbetter House	Albertus Ledbetter House	January 4, 2001 (#00001616)	125 Haynes Rd. 35°32′08″N 82°06′17″W	Montford Cove	
9	Linville Falls Tavern (former)	Linville Falls Tavern (former)	December 28, 2000 (#00001554)	25 Rock House Ln. 35°57′32″N 81°56′34″W	Linville Falls	Now Famous Louise's Rock House Restaurant. Extends into Avery County as well as Burke County.
10	Lone Beech	Lone Beech	June 2, 1995 (#95000639)	206 Hillcrest Dr. 35°41′07″N 82°00′47″W	Marion	
11	Main Street Historic District	Main Street Historic District	March 28, 1991 (#91000292)	Roughly bounded by U.S. Route 70 and Garden, State, and Logan Sts. 35°41′04″N 82°00′35″W	Marion	
12	McDowell County Courthouse	McDowell County Courthouse	May 10, 1979 (#79003131)	Main and E. Court Sts. 35°41′02″N 82°00′32″W	Marion	
13	Old Fort Commercial Historic District	Old Fort Commercial Historic District	April 29, 2011 (#11000257)	Roughly bounded by E. Main, Spring, Commerce, and W. Main Sts. 35°37′45″N 82°10′53″W	Old Fort	
14	St. John's Episcopal Church	St. John's Episcopal Church	March 28, 1991 (#91000290)	315 S. Main St. 35°40′48″N 82°00′25″W	Marion	
15	St. Matthew's Lutheran Church	St. Matthew's Lutheran Church	March 28, 1991 (#91000289)	307 W. Court St. 35°40′57″N 82°00′47″W	Marion	

== See also ==
- National Register of Historic Places listings in North Carolina
- List of National Historic Landmarks in North Carolina
