= Samuel Price Carson =

American politician (1798–1838)

Samuel Carson
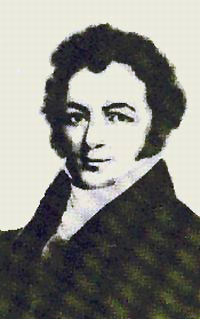

Secretary of State of Texas
- Acting
- In office March 18, 1836 – April 29, 1836
- President: David G. Burnet
- Preceded by: Position established
- Succeeded by: Samuel Collinsworth

Member of the U.S. House of Representatives from North Carolina's 12th district
- In office March 4, 1825 – March 3, 1833
- Preceded by: Robert B. Vance
- Succeeded by: James Graham

Personal details
- Born: Samuel Price Carson; January 22, 1798 McDowell County, North Carolina, U.S.
- Died: November 2, 1838 (aged 40) Hot Springs, Arkansas, U.S.
- Party: National Republican

Samuel Price Carson (January 22, 1798 – November 2, 1838) was an American political leader and farmer in both North Carolina and Texas. He served as a U.S. representative from North Carolina.

== North Carolina ==
He was born at Carson House, Pleasant Gardens, in what is now McDowell County, North Carolina, and studied under private tutors in Pleasant Gardens. His family held as many as 60 people in slavery, an unusually high number for the small estates of the area.

He engaged in agricultural pursuits and was a member of the North Carolina Senate from 1822 to 1824. Carson was elected as a Jacksonian to the Nineteenth and to the three succeeding Congresses (March 4, 1825 – March 3, 1833), but lost re-election in 1833. He was then again elected to the state senate in 1834 and served as a delegate to the State constitutional convention in 1835.

Robert Brank Vance was mortally wounded by Samuel Price Carson, who challenged him to a duel, fought at Saluda Gap, North Carolina, because of a derogatory remark made during the 1827 campaign.

Carson married Catherine Wilson on May 10, 1831, and they had a daughter together. They also adopted his illegitimate daughter by way of their neighbor Emma Trout.

== Texas / Arkansas ==
By 1836, he had moved to Texas, and was elected by his neighbors to the Convention of 1836, where he signed both the Texas Declaration of Independence and the Constitution of the Republic of Texas. The convention also established an interim or acting government for the republic, which was still at war in rebellion against Mexico. They considered him for president, but elected David G. Burnet, instead, by six votes more than Carson received. In a later vote they elected Carson the Secretary of State. President Burnet sent him to Washington, DC, to lead a team to negotiate for recognition of and aid for Texas, then later named James Collinsworth to replace him as secretary of state. When Carson learned of this from a newspaper, he simply went home.

Later, when borders were formalized, Carson's home was identified as part of Miller County, Arkansas. He died in Hot Springs, Arkansas, and is buried in the Government Cemetery there.

U.S. House of Representatives
Preceded by Robert B. Vance	Member of the U.S. House of Representatives from North Carolina's 12th congressional district 1825–1833	Succeeded by James Graham
Political offices
New office	Secretary of State of Texas; Acting; 1836	Succeeded by Samuel Collinsworth
