= Toms Creek Falls =

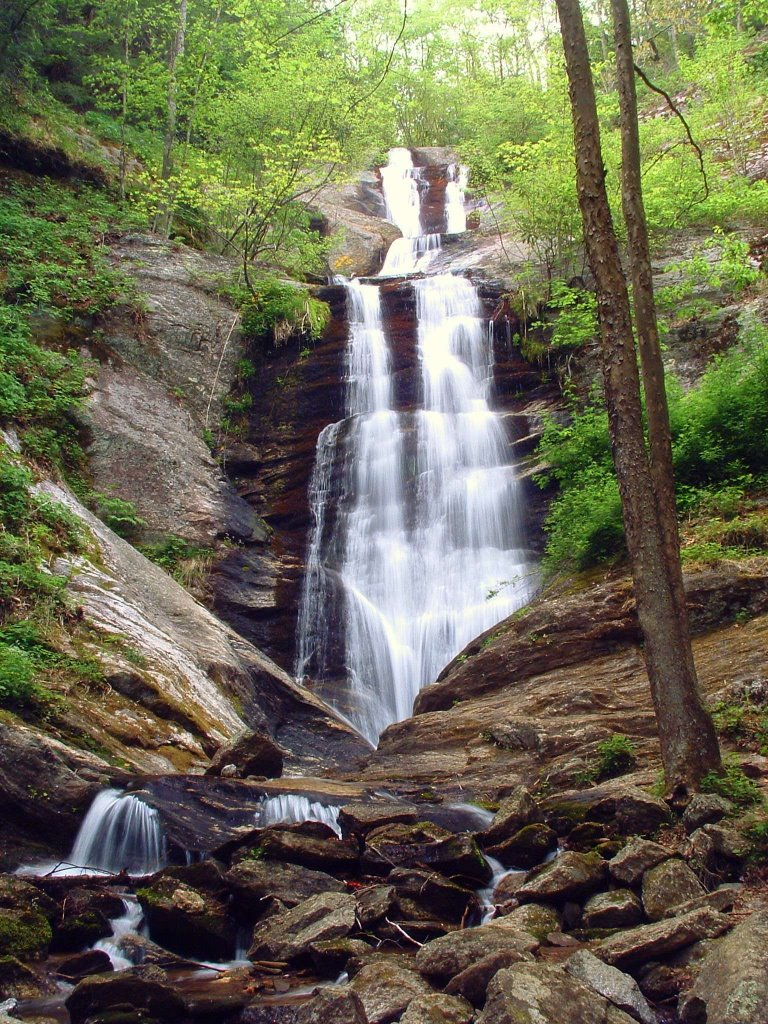
- Toms Creek Falls
- Interactive map of Toms Creek Falls
- Location: Pisgah National Forest, McDowell County, in the Blue Ridge Mountains of North Carolina
- Coordinates: 35.777575°N 82.062420°W
- Type: Cascade
- Total height: 60 ft (18.3 m)
- Number of drops: 3
- Longest drop: 30 ft (9.1 m)

Toms Creek Falls is a waterfall in the Pisgah National Forest in McDowell County, North Carolina, near the town of Marion.

== Geology ==
The 60-foot (18 m) falls are located on Toms Creek. The creek flows over several cascading upper sections of bedrock into a near-vertical lower cascade, ending in a small scoop in the rocks. A wide, flat pool area is at the base, located in a gully that has large amounts of mica embedded in the rock.

== Visiting the Falls ==
From the junction of US 221 and US 70 in Marion, go north on US 221 for 5.6 miles (9.0 km). Turn left on Huskins Branch Rd. and go 1.2 miles (1.9 km) to a small parking area located before the bridge that crosses Toms Creek. From the Parking lot, follow the moderate-difficulty 0.4-mile (0.64 km) trail to a short, moderately steep climb and scramble down to the base of the falls. A small creek crossing used to be required, but a bridge has been built over the creek. An old mine is located just downstream of the plunge pool.

== Nearby falls ==
- Catawba Falls
- Linville Falls
- Crabtree Falls (North Carolina)

== See also ==
- List of waterfalls
- List of waterfalls in North Carolina
