= Pleasant Gardens (North Carolina) =

Plantation in North Carolina

Coordinates: 35.7056°N 82.0346°W

Pleasant Gardens was the plantation in Rowan County, North Carolina, occupied by Joseph "Pleasant Gardens" McDowell (1758–1799). Remains of the Pleasant Gardens house are located near Marion, North Carolina.

== History ==
The land for the Pleasant Gardens estate was purchased by Hunting John McDowell, Joseph McDowell's father, in 1768. The land was originally located in Anson County until 1753, when it became Rowan County and became part of Burke County in 1777. Joseph McDowell was born on February 25, 1758, before his father purchased the Pleasant Gardens estate. In 1842, the land became part of McDowell County, named for Joseph "Pleasant Gardens" McDowell, who died on May 18, 1795.

Recent historical analysis and research on the remaining property indicates that the Pleasant Gardens plantation house was built between 1812 and 1826 by Joseph McDowell's third son James Moffett McDowell (1791-1854). The plantation remained in this McDowell family until 1848. The plantation, currently located on U.S. 70, northwest of Marion, North Carolina, fell into disrepair in the 20th century.

In the 1790 Census in Burke County, North Carolina, Joseph McDowell, Jr. is listed as head of household with two white males under the age of 16, one female, and nine slaves.

After Joseph McDowell's death, his wife, Mary Moffett McDowell, married John Carson. Mary inherited part of the Pleasant Gardens estate on which John Carson built Carson House.
