= Green River Plantation =

Historic house in North Carolina, United States

- U.S. National Register of Historic Places
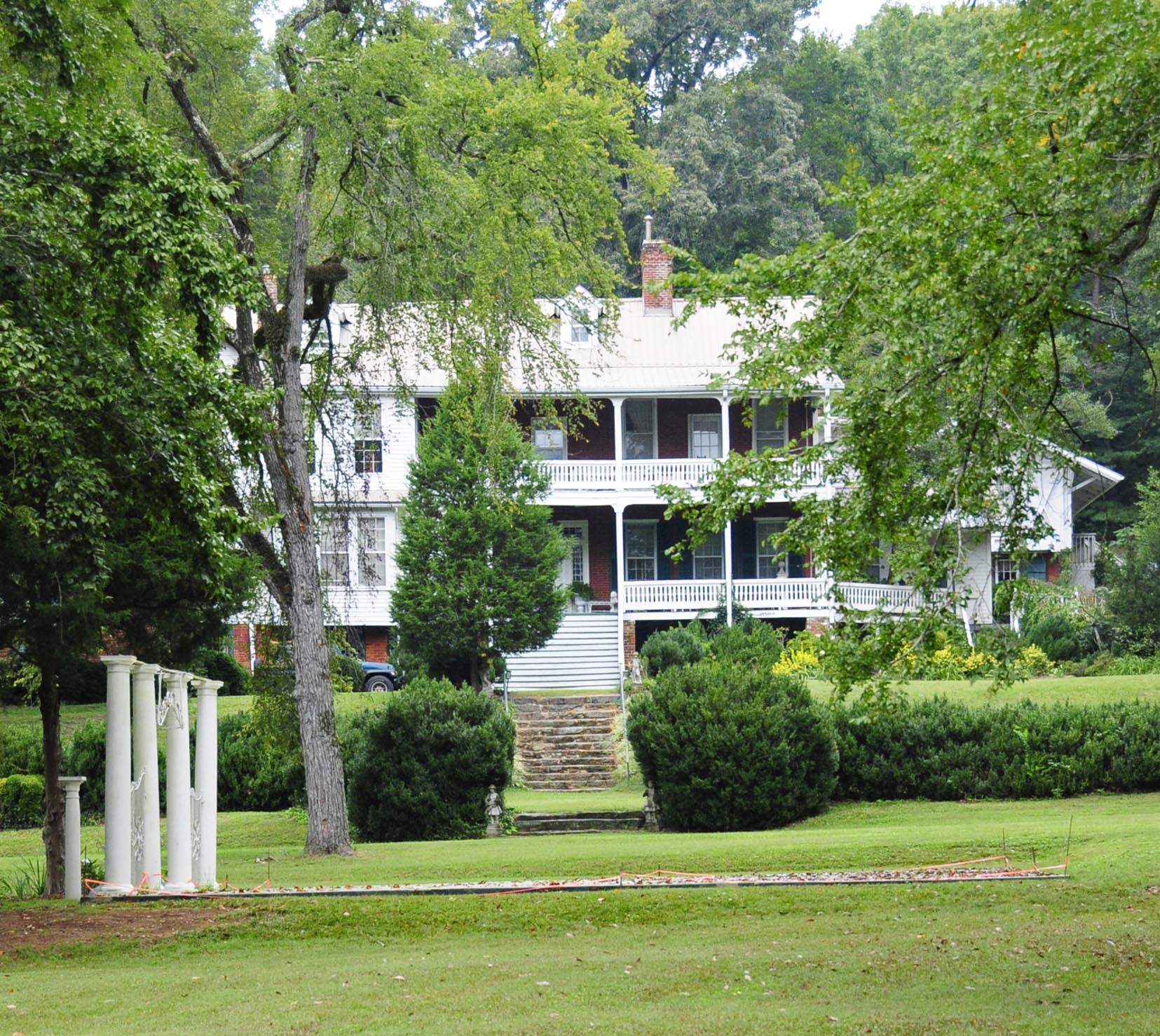
- Green River Plantation, September 2012

- Location within North Carolina Location within the United States
- Location: East of Columbus off SR 1005, near Columbus, North Carolina
- Coordinates: 35°17′12″N 82°01′06″W
- Area: 30 acres (12 ha)
- Built: 1807
- Built by: Joseph McDowell Carson
- Architectural style: Greek Revival, Federal, Gothic Revival
- NRHP reference No.: 74001370
- Added to NRHP: March 28, 1974

Green River Plantation is a historic plantation house on over 360 acres located near Columbus, Polk County, North Carolina. The oldest section of the "Big House" was built between the years 1804–1807, and is a two-story, four-bay, Late Federal style frame dwelling. A later two-story, four-bay, brick Greek Revival style dwelling was built beside the original structure in the mid-19th century. The two sections were joined in the late 19th century by a two-story section and grand staircase to form a structure that is over 10,000 square feet in size and boasts over 42 rooms and spaces. The plantation house was built by Joseph McDowell Carson, son of Col. John Carson, who built Carson House at Marion, North Carolina. The later-built section of the home was the residence of Samuel Price Carson, North Carolina State Senator and U.S. Federal Representative, and younger brother of Joseph McDowell Carson.

Green River Plantation was added to the National Register of Historic Places in 1974. The plantation house and surrounding grounds are a private residence but are open for historic tours with reservation. The grounds and facilities can also be reserved for events such as weddings, receptions, luncheons, concerts, corporate events, and reunions.
