= Joseph McDowell House =

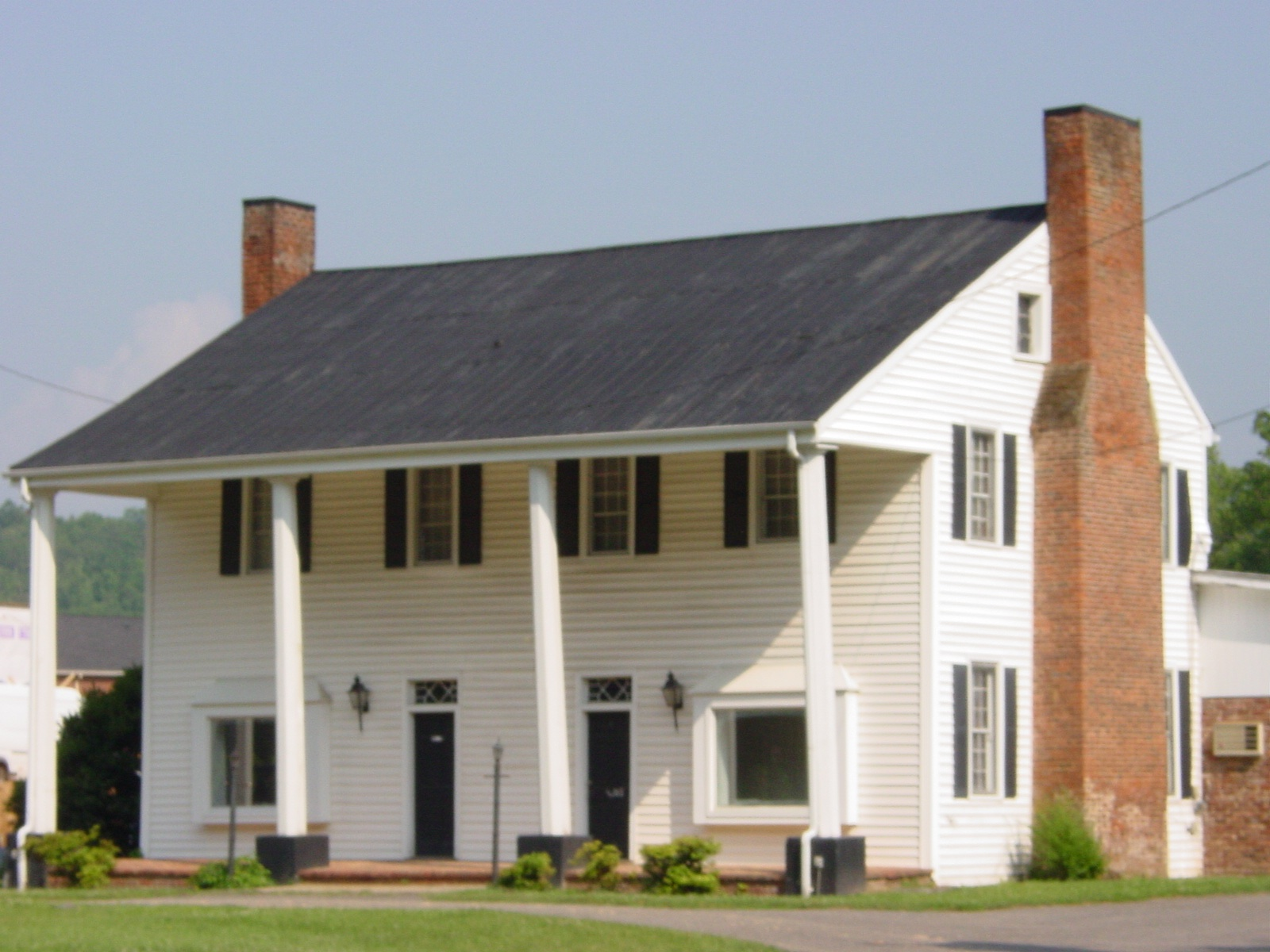

- Location within North Carolina

General information
- Architectural style: Plantation
- Location: 136 U.S. Route 70, Marion, North Carolina
- Coordinates: 35°42′19.9″N 82°02′04.5″W
- Completed: 1787

The Joseph McDowell House is a historic house and museum located in Marion, McDowell County, North Carolina. It was the home of Colonel Joseph "Pleasant Gardens" McDowell, the founder and namesake of McDowell County. It is currently undergoing extensive renovations, and is closed to the public.

== History ==
The McDowell House was built in 1787, and is one of the oldest surviving frame houses in western North Carolina. Along with the nearby Carson House, it is an important piece of McDowell County history, and is currently in the process of major restoration.

Built by Colonel Joseph McDowell, an American Revolutionary War hero who fought at the Battle of Kings Mountain. Joseph McDowell was a member of the Overmountain Men, traveling with Col. Charles McDowell’s regiment to the Watauga settlements in September, 1780 and on to Kings Mountain in pursuit of British Major Patrick Ferguson’s Loyalist regime. McDowell County is named in his honor. It is the last standing home place in North Carolina for which a county was named. In addition to fighting at the Battle of Kings Mountain, Colonel McDowell served in the 3rd U.S. Congress of 1793-95. He was a son of "Hunting" John McDowell, who received a Royal Land Grant from Governor Tryon on December 22, 1767 for 640 acres (2.6 km^{2}) on the Catawba River, a portion of which is the site of this home.

The McDowell House was identified in the 1982 Comprehensive Management Plan for the Overmountain Victory National Historic Trail as one of only 34 non-federal historical resources which are directly or indirectly related to the Trail. In early 2008, the home and grounds were purchased and steps are being taken to create a restoration and use plan. Also in 2008, the McDowell House was officially added to the Overmountain Victory Historic Trail. Upon completion of the home restoration, this historic home will continue to serve to interpret the McDowell family history, and the history of McDowell County.

== Joseph McDowell Historical Catawba Greenway ==
Construction of the Joseph McDowell Historical Catawba Greenway was completed in Summer 2010 and Phase I opened to the public in September 2010. Phase I of the Greenway offers a one-mile recreational trail, picnic area, fishing pier, wildlife observation deck, and access to the Little Round Hill Trail. In 2014, the McDowell Trails Association completed the paving of the 0.5 mile Little Round Hill Loop Trail located off of Phase I of the Greenway. Phase II of the Greenway was completed in March 2015 and extends an additional 0.7 miles to the Joseph McDowell House on US Highway 70 West and beyond. Phase II includes a paved greenway trail, paved driveway and parking lot at the McDowell House property, an amphitheater, fitness stations and a canoe launch off of US Highway 221 North Business. If you start on one end of the Greenway, walk to the other end, walk once around the Round Hill Loop and come back to the beginning, you will have walked approximately 3.2 miles and have completed a 5K.
