= Burrell James =

American politician

Burrell S. James was a state legislator in South Carolina. He served in the South Carolina House of Representatives. His photograph was included in a montage of "Radical Republican" South Carolina state legislators.

He represented Sumter County, South Carolina. He was African American.

He married. He was one of the incorporators of the Sumter Land & Joint Stock Loan Association.

He was listed in an 1887 A.M.E. publication as involved in church work in Marion, North Carolina.
