= Glenwood, North Carolina =

- Census-designated place
- Location within North Carolina Location within the United States
- Coordinates: 35°36′58″N 81°58′59″W
- Country: United States
- State: North Carolina
- County: McDowell

Area
  - Total: 1.63 sq mi (4.21 km^{2})
  - Land: 1.61 sq mi (4.18 km^{2})
  - Water: 0.012 sq mi (0.03 km^{2})
- Elevation: 1,309 ft (399 m)

Population (2020)
  - Total: 501
  - Density: 310.5/sq mi (119.88/km^{2})
- Time zone: UTC-5 (Eastern (EST))
  - Summer (DST): UTC-4 (EDT)
- ZIP Code: 28737
- Area code: 828
- GNIS feature ID: 2812796
- FIPS code: 37-26560

Glenwood is an unincorporated community and census-designated place in McDowell County, North Carolina, United States. It was first listed as a CDP in the 2020 census with a population of 501.

== Geography ==
Glenwood is located along U.S. Route 221, 6 miles (10 km) south of Marion and 18 miles (29 km) north of Rutherfordton. Glenwood has a post office with ZIP code 28737.

According to the U.S. Census Bureau, the Glenwood CDP has an area of 1.6 square miles (4.1 km^{2}), of which 0.001 square miles (0.003 km^{2}), or 0.62%, are water. The community is drained by North Muddy Creek and its tributary, Goose Creek. North Muddy Creek is a northeast-flowing tributary of the Catawba River.

== Demographics ==
Historical population
| Census | Pop. | Note | %± |
|---|---|---|---|
| 2020 | 501 | | — |
U.S. Decennial Census; 2020

=== 2020 census ===
Glenwood CDP, North Carolina – Racial and Ethnic Composition (NH = Non-Hispanic) Note: the US Census treats Hispanic/Latino as an ethnic category. This table excludes Latinos from the racial categories and assigns them to a separate category. Hispanics/Latinos may be of any race.
| Race / Ethnicity | Pop 2020 | % 2020 |
|---|---|---|
| White alone (NH) | 471 | 94.01% |
| Black or African American alone (NH) | 8 | 1.60% |
| Native American or Alaska Native alone (NH) | 0 | 0.00% |
| Asian alone (NH) | 1 | 0.20% |
| Pacific Islander alone (NH) | 0 | 0.00% |
| Some Other Race alone (NH) | 4 | 0.80% |
| Mixed Race/Multi-Racial (NH) | 13 | 2.59% |
| Hispanic or Latino (any race) | 4 | 0.80% |
| Total | 501 | 100.00% |
