= McDowell County Courthouse =

McDowell County Courthouse may refer to:

- McDowell County Courthouse (North Carolina), listed on the NRHP in North Carolina
- McDowell County Courthouse (West Virginia), listed on the NRHP in West Virginia
