= St. John's Episcopal Church (Marion, North Carolina) =

Historic church in North Carolina, United States

- U.S. National Register of Historic Places
- U.S. Historic district – Contributing property
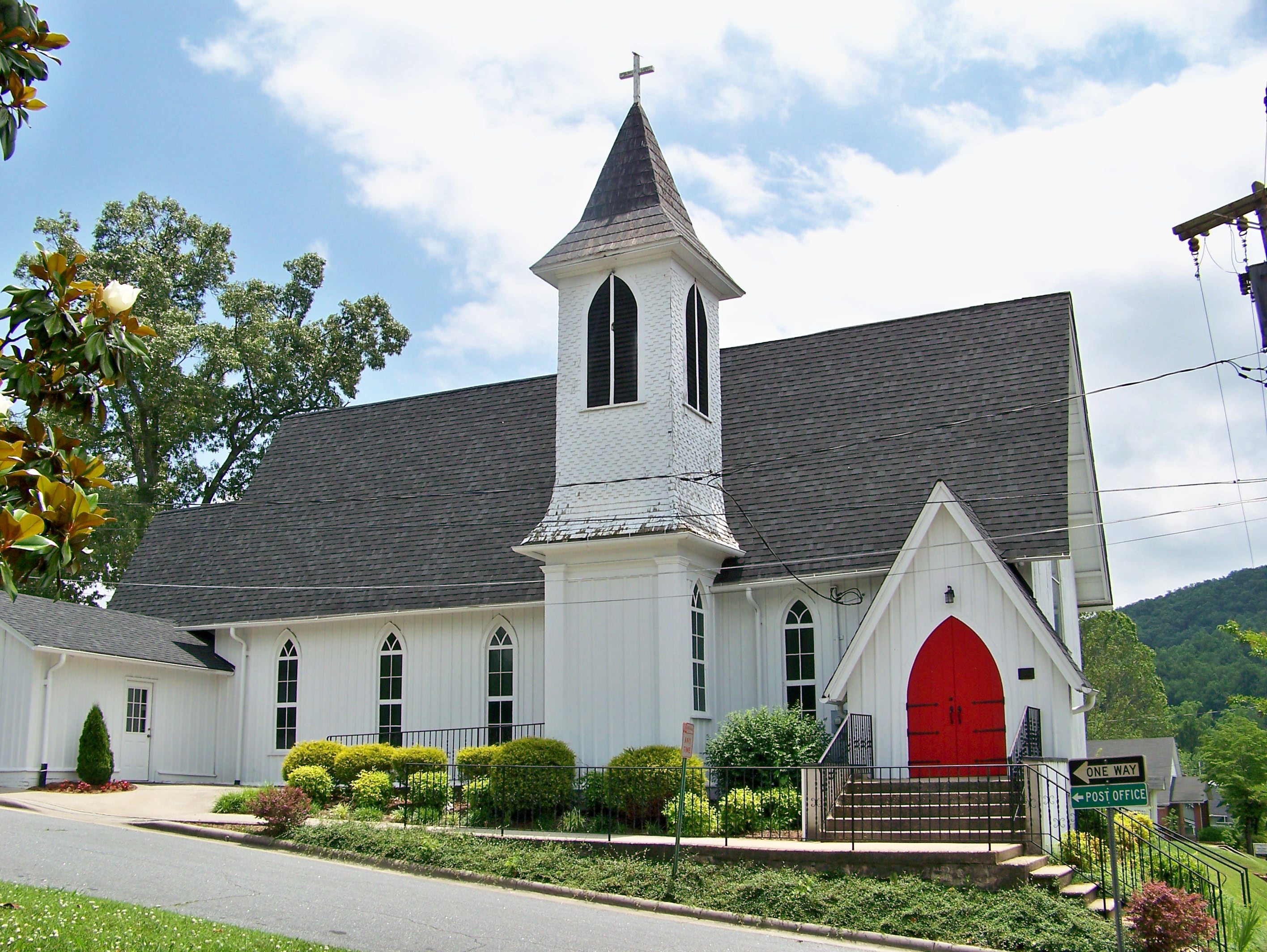

- Location within North Carolina Location within the United States
- Location: 289 S. Main St., Marion, North Carolina
- Coordinates: 35°40′48″N 82°0′25″W
- Area: 0.1 acres (0.040 ha)
- Built: 1883
- Architect: Bland, Charles Theodore; Dellinger, William
- Architectural style: Carpenter Gothic
- MPS: Downtown Marion MPS
- NRHP reference No.: 91000290
- Added to NRHP: March 28, 1991

St. John's Episcopal Church is a historic Episcopal church located at 289 S. Main Street in Marion, McDowell County, North Carolina. It was built in 1883, and is a one-story, Carpenter Gothic style frame church. It has a steeply pitched gable roof, board and batten exterior walls, lancet windows, and an elaborate bell tower added in 1903. St. John's is one of the few buildings that survived the 1894 fire on Main Street. St. John's Episcopal Church is a vibrant spiritual Community with roots formed more than a Century ago.

The St. John's Episcopal Church, Marion, NC dates back to May 24, 1881, with the first two years of St. John's, services were held in private homes and other church buildings. Since 1883 the church has congregated at the same location on South Main Street.

It was added to the National Register of Historic Places in 1991. It is located in the Main Street Historic District.
