= Johnson City Southern Railway Company =

Railroad company in North Carolina, United States

Overview
- Headquarters: Marion, North Carolina

Johnson City Southern Railway Company was a railway company incorporated in 1905 "in North Carolina to build a railroad from Marion, North Carolina, to the Tennessee state line".
