= St. Matthew's Lutheran Church =

Historic church in North Carolina, United States

- U.S. National Register of Historic Places
- U.S. Historic district – Contributing property
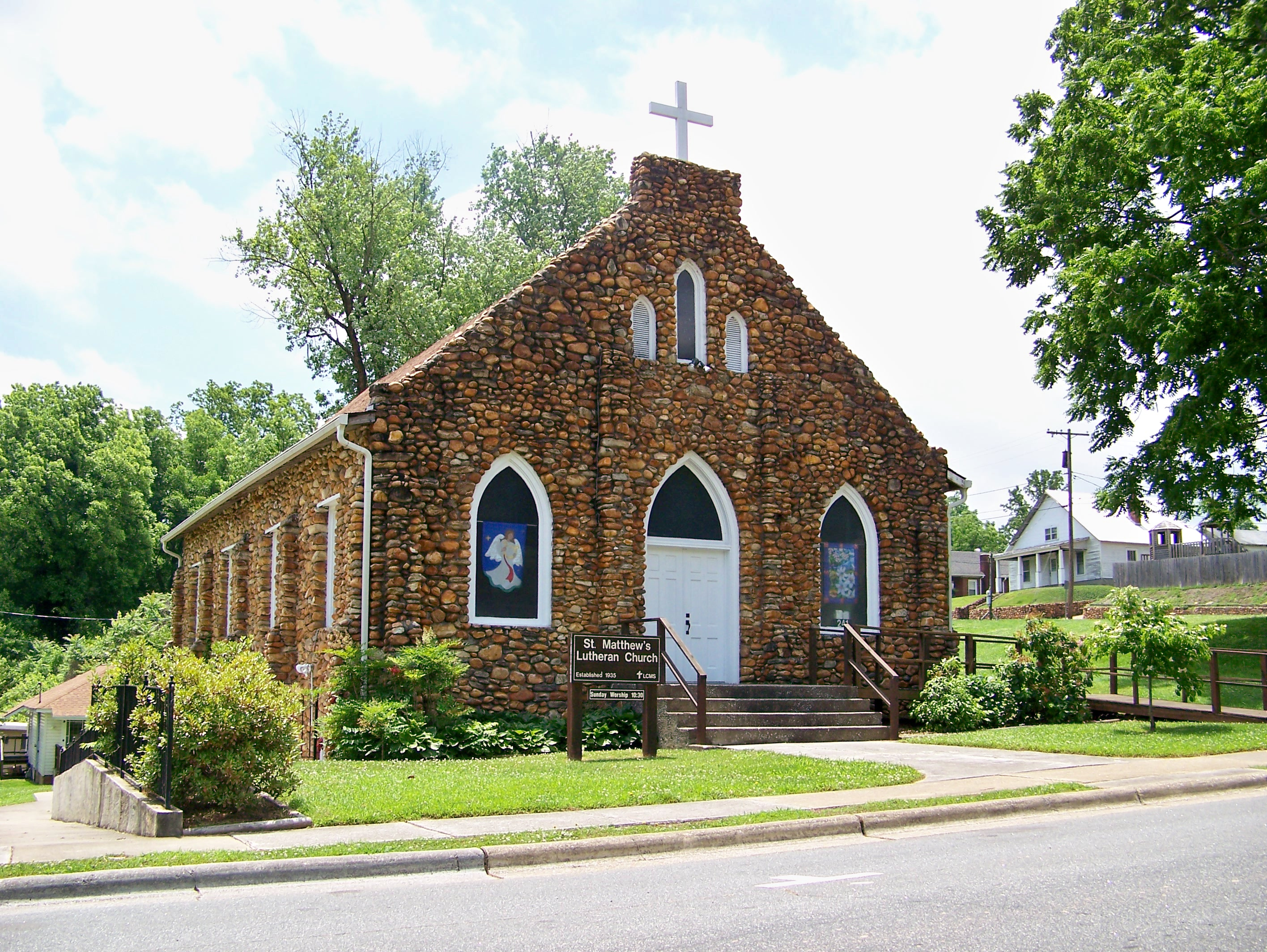

- Location within North Carolina Location within the United States
- Location: 307 W. Court St., Marion, North Carolina
- Coordinates: 35°40′57″N 82°0′47″W
- Area: 0.1 acres (0.040 ha)
- Built: 1935
- Built by: Williams, Pink
- Architect: Herman, Q. E.
- Architectural style: Late Gothic Revival, Vernacular Late Gothic Revival
- MPS: Downtown Marion MPS
- NRHP reference No.: 91000289
- Added to NRHP: March 28, 1991

St. Matthew's Lutheran Church is a historic Lutheran church located at 307 W. Court Street in Marion, McDowell County, North Carolina. It was built in 1935 and is a one-story, vernacular Late Gothic Revival-style church constructed with river rocks. The building features lancet windows and flying buttresses.

It was added to the National Register of Historic Places in 1991. It is located in the Main Street Historic District.
