= First Presbyterian Church (Marion, North Carolina) =

Historic church in North Carolina, United States

- U.S. National Register of Historic Places
- U.S. Historic district – Contributing property
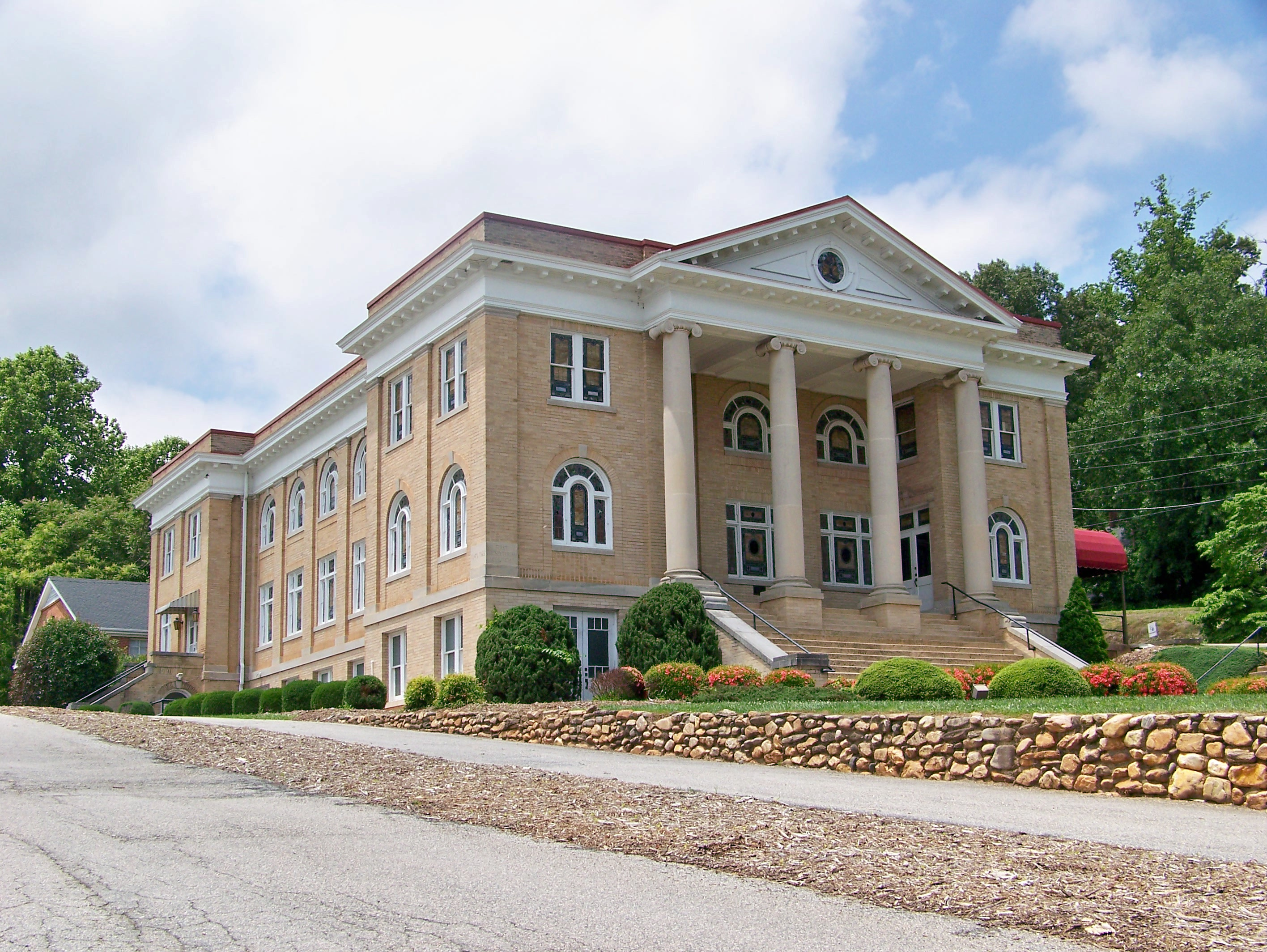

- Location within North Carolina Location within the United States
- Location: 79 Academy Street Marion, North Carolina
- Coordinates: 35°41′3″N 82°0′46″W
- Area: less than one acre
- Built: 1923
- Architect: Greene, James E.
- Architectural style: Classical Revival
- MPS: Downtown Marion MPS
- NRHP reference No.: 91000291
- Added to NRHP: March 28, 1991

First Presbyterian Church is a historic Presbyterian church located behind the Marion Recreation building, near the Marion Library, at 79 Academy Street in Marion, McDowell County, North Carolina. Established in 1845, it was the first organized church of any denomination in the town of Marion. The church is a "daughter" of two older Presbyterian missions in the region: the Muddy Creek Mission (which became Drusilla Church) and the Pleasant Gardens Mission (which became Siloam Church).

It was added to the National Register of Historic Places in 1991. It is located in the Main Street Historic District.

== History ==
=== Foundation and Early Years (1845–1850) ===
On August 30, 1845, a group of individuals from various Presbyterian churches met in Marion to discuss the formation of a local congregation. The church was officially organized by evangelist Rev. George M. Gibbs on October 11, 1845, with fifteen charter members.

The first ruling elders were Adolphus L. Erwin, James Harvey Greenlee, and John Neal. For its first two years, the congregation lacked a dedicated building and held services in the McDowell County Court House

=== Church Edifices ===
- First Building (1847): The church’s first dedicated home was a small brick structure completed in 1847. Rev. Gibbs preached the first sermon in this building on December 26, 1847.
- Second Building (1922–1943): The cornerstone for a new, larger edifice was laid in 1922. The structure was formally dedicated on September 5, 1943, during the pastorate of Rev. Carl W. McMurray. It is a one-story plus balcony Classical Revival-style brick building set on a raised basement. The front facade features a monumental Ionic order tetrastyle pedimented portico.

== Leadership ==
=== Notable Pastors ===
- Rev. George McKinzie Gibbs (1845–1850): The church's first minister and founder, who served two pastorates.
- Rev. Carl Walker McMurray, Ph.D. (1938–1945+): Serving as pastor during the church's centennial, McMurray was educated at Princeton Theological Seminary and Edinburgh University.

=== Organization (1945) ===
At the time of its 100th anniversary in 1945, the church leadership included:

- Clerk of Session: B. F. Pollard.
- Board of Trustees Chairman: Dr. Guy S. Kirby.
- Board of Deacons Chairman: J. Neal Morris.
- Sunday School Superintendent: Chas. A. Harris.

== Membership and Community ==
From an initial charter group of 15 members, the church grew to an enrollment of 350 by 1945. The church roll historically included several generations of the founding families, such as the Erwins, Greenlees, and Neals. Notably, the charter members included Eliza Erwin, a Black member admitted by examination on August 31, 1845.

The church also maintained several active organizations, including the Woman's Auxiliary, the Youth Fellowship, and the "Men-of-the-Church" (though the latter became inactive during World War II).

== Centennial Celebration ==
In October 1945, the church celebrated its One Hundredth Anniversary with a week of special programming, including a Centennial Communion, a historical program, and a "Home-Coming" dinner on the grounds. For this occasion, Rev. McMurray composed a poem titled "Centennial Chimes" to honor the century of faith.
