= Depot Historic District (Marion, North Carolina) =

Historic district in North Carolina, United States

- U.S. National Register of Historic Places
- U.S. Historic district
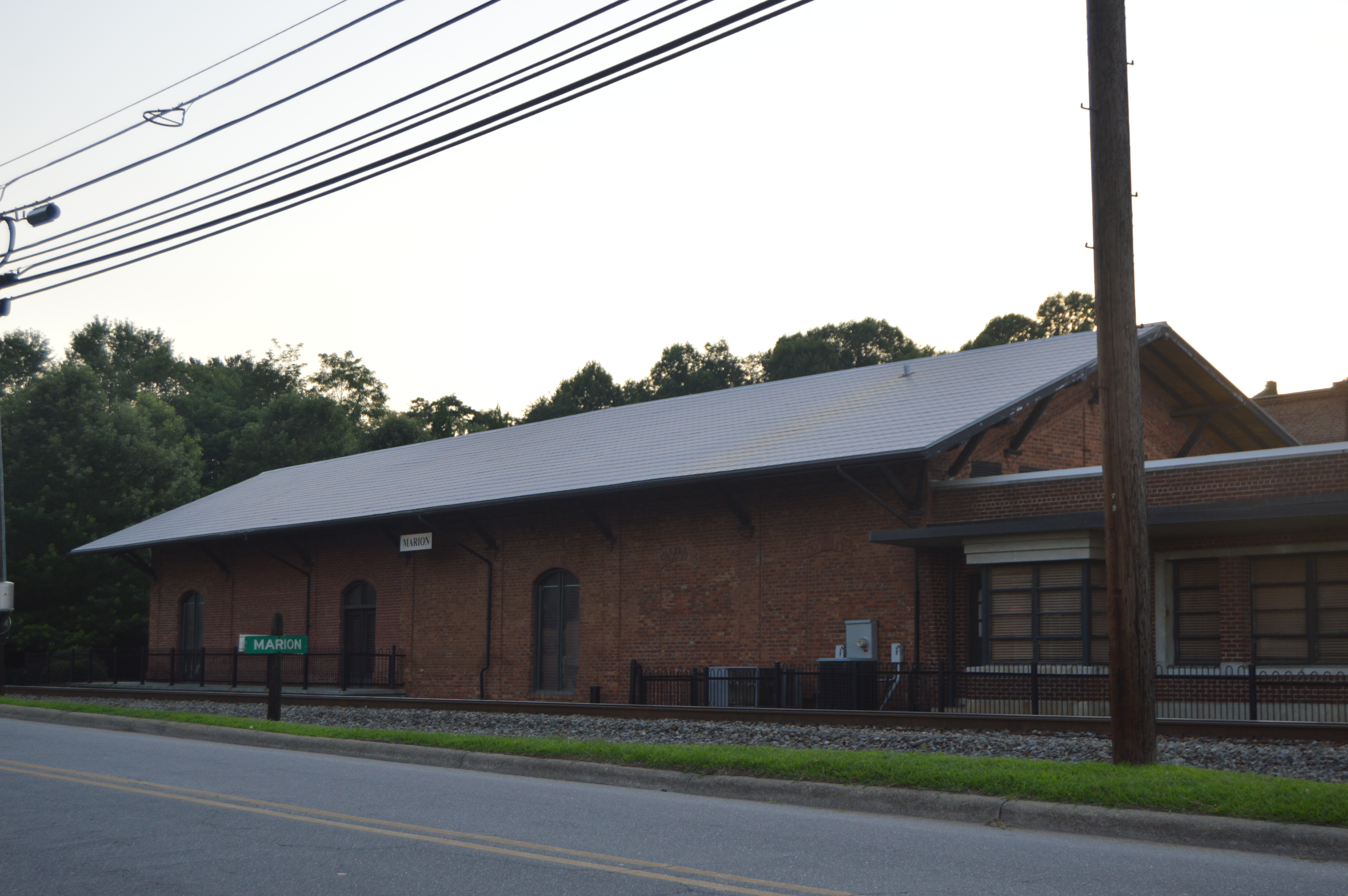
- Depot from east

- Location within North Carolina Location within the United States
- Location: Southeastern end of Depot St., bounded on the south by the Southern railroad tracks, and 111 Railroad St., south of the tracks, in Marion, North Carolina
- Coordinates: 35°40′52″N 82°0′38″W
- Area: 2.3 acres (0.93 ha)
- Built: c. 1894-1935
- Architectural style: Chicago, Commercial Style
- MPS: Downtown Marion MPS
- NRHP reference No.: 91000293
- Added to NRHP: March 28, 1991

Depot Historic District is a national historic district located at Marion, McDowell County, North Carolina. The district encompasses five contributing buildings associated with the Southern Railway depot at Marion. The buildings date from about 1894 to about 1935. They are a commercial building (c. 1913), four-story former Buffaloe Building (c. 1908), commercial building (1911), Laughridge Furniture Company Building (c. 1894), and freight depot (c. 1935).

It was listed on the National Register of Historic Places in 1991.
