= Albertus Ledbetter House =

Historic house in North Carolina, United States

- U.S. National Register of Historic Places
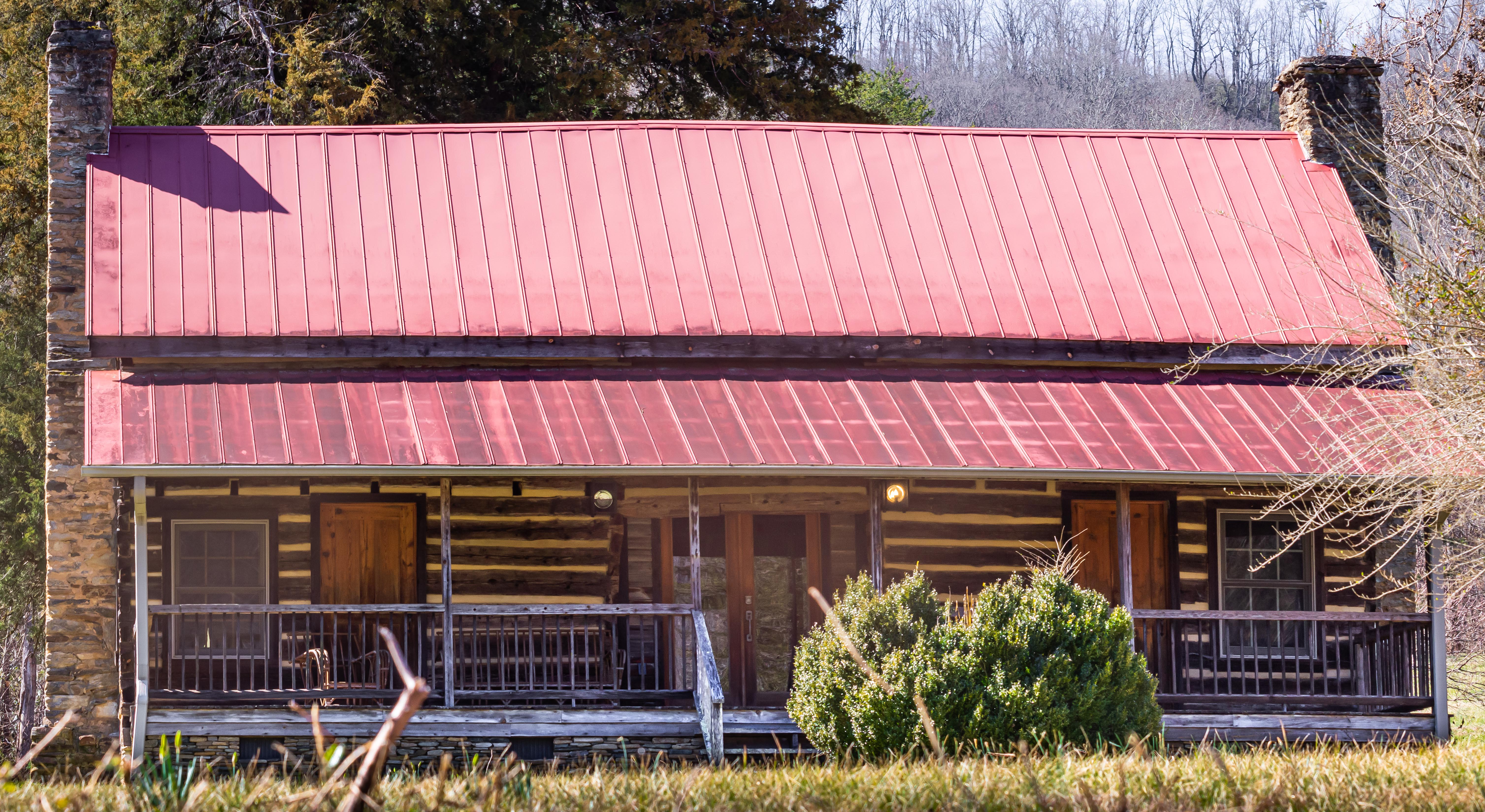

- Location within North Carolina Location within the United States
- Location: 125 Haynes Rd., near Montford Cove, North Carolina
- Coordinates: 35°32′8″N 82°6′17″W
- Area: 5.2 acres (2.1 ha)
- Built: c. 1826, c. 1836
- Architectural style: Federal
- NRHP reference No.: 00001616
- Added to NRHP: January 4, 2001

Albertus Ledbetter House is a historic home located near Montford Cove, McDowell County, North Carolina. The house was built for the family of Jonathan Ledbetter, a Revolutionary War veteran and pioneer settler. His son Albertus Ledbetter continued to live there as an adult.

The original section was built about 1826, and enlarged to its present size about 1836. It is two-story, side-gabled, timber frame dwelling with Federal style decorative elements. It features a one-story, full-width, shed-roofed porch. Also on the property are the contributing log smokehouse (c. 1826) and log spring house (c. 1826).

Vacant for years and in poor condition, the house was restored by a couple in 1999 who took great care in preserving its historical details. It was listed on the National Register of Historic Places in 2001.
