= U.S. Route 221 =

Highway in the United States

U.S. Route 221
- US 221 highlighted in red

Route information
- Auxiliary route of US 21
- Length: 734 mi (1,181 km)
- Existed: 1930–present

Major junctions
- South end: US 19 / US 27 Alt. / US 98 / SR 55 / CR 361A in Perry, FL
- I-10 near Greenville, FL; I-75 in Valdosta, GA; I-16 near Soperton, GA; I-20 near Harlem, GA; I-385 near Laurens, SC; I-26 in Roebuck, SC; I-85 in Spartanburg, SC; I-40 in Marion, NC; I-77 near Hillsville, VA; I-581 in Roanoke, VA
- North end: US 29 Bus. / US 460 Bus. / US 501 Bus. at Lynchburg, VA

Location
- Country: United States
- States: Florida, Georgia, South Carolina, North Carolina, Virginia

Highway system
- United States Numbered Highway System; List; Special; Divided

U.S. Route 221 (US 221) is a 734-mile-long (1,181 km) spur of U.S. Route 21. It travels from Perry, Florida, at US 19/US 98/US 27 Alternate to Lynchburg, Virginia, at US 29 Business (Lynchburg Expressway). It travels through the states of Florida, Georgia, South Carolina, North Carolina, and Virginia. It travels through the cities of Valdosta, Georgia; Spartanburg, South Carolina; Marion, North Carolina; Roanoke, Virginia; and Lynchburg, Virginia.

== Route description ==
=== Florida ===
A US 221 shield used in Florida prior to 1993

U.S. Route 221 originates just south of the city of Perry, with its southern terminus intersecting with the cosigned U.S. Route 19 U.S. Route 98 and U.S. Route 27 Alternate, taking hidden SR 55 with it away from US 19. It continues through the city of Perry and intersects Interstate 10 and U.S. Route 90 in rural Madison County before crossing into Georgia.

=== Georgia ===
U.S. Route 221 runs through the cities of Quitman, Valdosta, Lakeland, Pearson, and Douglas in southern Georgia.

In Quitman, it joins U.S. Route 84 (cosigned Georgia State Route 38) to Valdosta. From Valdosta to Douglas, it joins with Georgia State Route 31. It also joins with Georgia State Route 135 and State Route 56. From Pearson to Douglas, it joins with U.S. Route 441 as a four-lane highway, which was completed in 2000.

In Douglas, U.S. Route 221 runs as the eastern part of Bowens Mill Rd. and will be widened in the future. It passes through Hazelhurst, Mount Vernon and Soperton before crossing Interstate 16, then later joins up with U.S. Route 1 and Georgia State Route 4 after passing through Louisville. After going through Wrens, it splits off to the north, cosigned with Georgia State Route 47 and passes through Harlem before crossing Interstate 20 /Georgia State Route 402 approximately 20 miles west of Augusta. Shortly before crossing into South Carolina, Georgia State Route 150 merges with Route 221 at the Pollards Corner intersection as Georgia 47 turns away. The passage into South Carolina takes place on top of the J. Strom Thurmond Dam, which forms the southern shore of Lake Strom Thurmond.

=== South Carolina ===
U.S. Route 221 enters South Carolina in rural McCormick County at the southeastern edge of Lake Strom Thurmond. It continues north and northwestward to the town of McCormick. From McCormick, it continues northerly to the city of Greenwood.

From Greenwood, U.S. Route 221 continues northeasterly to the city of Waterloo, South Carolina. U.S. Truck Route 221 bypasses the city of Laurens on the east side. It continues northerly and intersects Interstate 385 in rural Laurens County and proceeds to intersect Interstate 26 in rural Spartanburg County.

U.S. Route 221 continues through the center of the city of Spartanburg before intersecting Interstate 85 just north of the city. It continues to the city of Chesnee before exiting the state in a rural area of Cherokee County. The southern terminus of U.S. Alternate Route 221 intersects the main route in the city of Chesnee and exits the state a few miles to the east of the main route.

=== North Carolina ===
View north along US 221 past NC 105 in Linville, North Carolina

US 221 is a major highway in Western North Carolina. It runs through the cities and towns of Rutherfordton, Marion, Blowing Rock, Boone, and Jefferson. The highway is predominantly two-lane, while four-lane in Marion, Blowing Rock, and Boone. The section from the U.S. Route 321 interchange just east of Boone and into Jefferson in Ashe County is now a divided, four-lane controlled-access road, making this section a much more pleasant and scenic one. Two sections of the highway can be considered challenging and twisty: 13-mile stretch between Linville and Blowing Rock, and a 21-mile stretch between Jefferson and Twin Oaks.

U.S. Route 221 has one Alternate (continuing from South Carolina) and two Business Routes (in Marion and Jefferson). It intersects two major highways: U.S. Route 74 near Rutherfordton and I-40 near Marion; and also intersects with the Blue Ridge Parkway four times.

=== Virginia ===
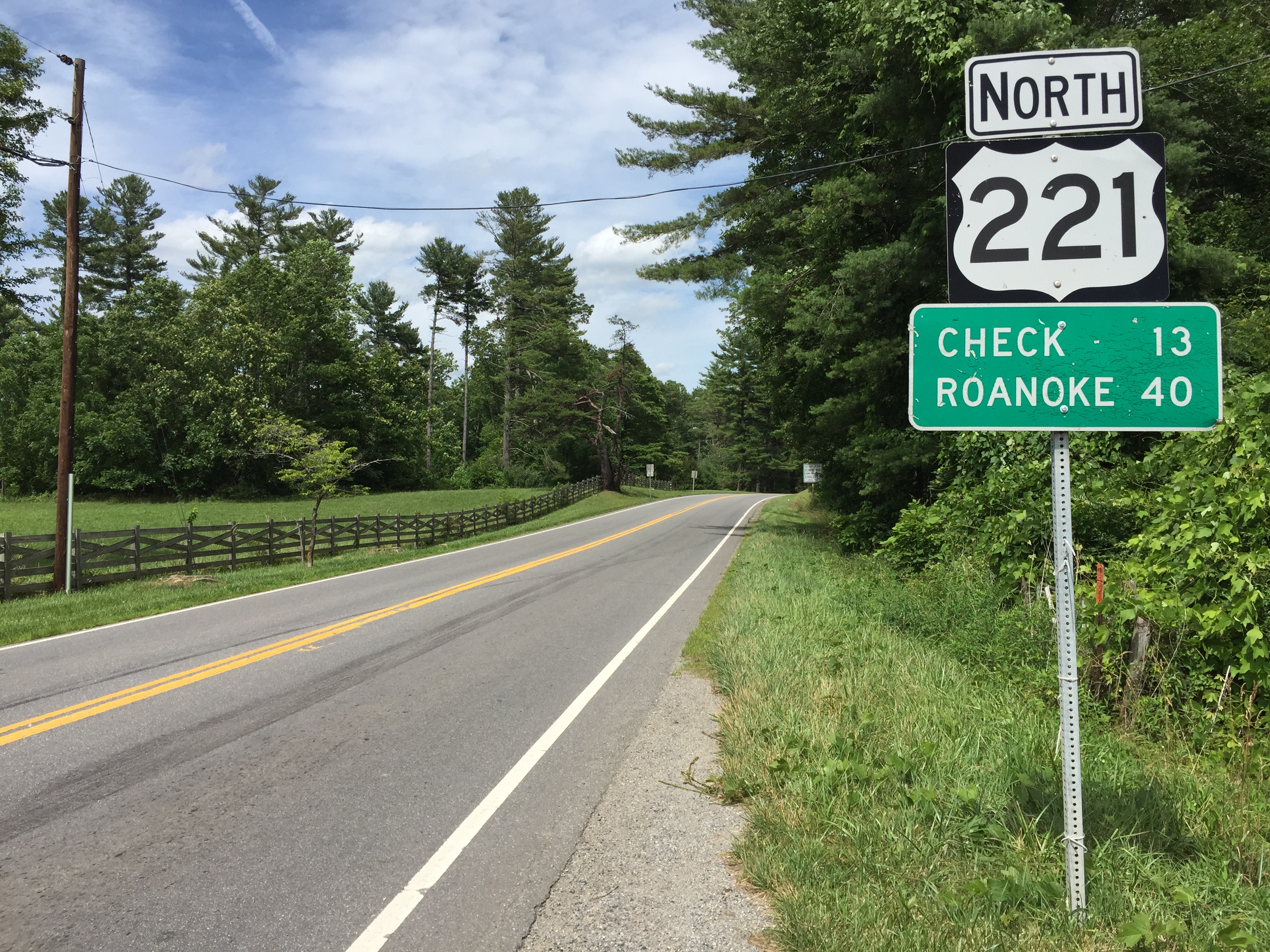
View north along US 221 at SR 615 just north of Floyd, Virginia

In Virginia, US 221 runs 149.61 miles (240.77 km) from the North Carolina state line near Independence north to its northern terminus at US 29 Business, US 460 Business, and US 501 Business in Lynchburg. US 221 connects Independence, Galax, and Hillsville in Southwest Virginia while running concurrently with US 58. The U.S. Highway connects those communities with Roanoke via Floyd County, within which US 221 is the main west–east highway. The U.S. Highway also runs concurrently with US 460 from Roanoke to Bedford and parallels that U.S. Highway from Bedford to Lynchburg.

== Major intersections ==
Florida
US 19 / US 98 in Perry
US 27 in Perry
I-10 south-southeast of Greenville
US 90 in Greenville. The highways travel concurrently through Greenville.
Georgia
US 84 in Quitman. The highways travel concurrently to Valdosta.
I-75 in Valdosta
US 41 / US 84 in Valdosta. US 41/US 221 travels concurrently through Valdosta.
US 129 in Lakeland. The highways travel concurrently to east-northeast of Lakeland.
US 441 south-southwest of Pearson. The highways travel concurrently to Douglas.
US 82 in Pearson
US 23 / US 341 in Hazlehurst. The highways travel concurrently through Hazlehurst.
US 280 in Mount Vernon
I-16 north of Soperton
US 80 north-northeast of Norristown
US 319 south-southwest of Bartow. The highways travel concurrently to Bartow.
US 1 in Louisville. The highways travel concurrently to Wrens.
Future I-14 in Wrens
US 78 / US 278 in Harlem
I-20 south of Appling
South Carolina
US 378 in McCormick. The highways travel concurrently through McCormick.
US 25 / US 178 south-southeast of Greenwood. The highways travel concurrently to northeast of Greenwood.
US 76 in Laurens
I-385 north of Laurens
I-26 east-northeast of Moore
US 29 in Spartanburg
I-585 / US 176 north of Spartanburg
I-85 east of Valley Falls
North Carolina
US 74 southwest of Forest City
US 64 in Rutherfordton
I-40 southeast of West Marion
US 70 in Marion
US 321 in Blowing Rock. The siblings travel concurrently to Boone.
US 421 in Boone. The siblings travel in a wrong-way concurrency to north-northeast of Deep Gap.
US 21 in Twin Oaks. US 221 travels concurrently with its parent to Independence, Virginia.
Virginia
US 21 / US 58 in Independence. US 58/US 221 travels concurrently to Hillsville.
Future I-74 / I-77 in Woodlawn
US 52 in Hillsville
US 11 in Roanoke. The highways travel concurrently through Roanoke.
Future I-73 / I-581 / US 220 in Roanoke
US 11 / US 460 in Roanoke. US 221/US 460 travels concurrently to Bedford.
US 501 in Lynchburg

US 29 Bus. / US 460 Bus. / US 501 Bus. in Lynchburg
