= Lake Tahoma =

- Location within North Carolina Location within the United States
- Location: McDowell County, North Carolina
- Coordinates: 35°43′37″N 82°05′04″W
- Type: Reservoir
- Basin countries: United States
- Max. depth: 55 ft (17 m)
- Surface elevation: 1,401 ft (427 m)

Lake Tahoma is a private lake in the mountains of Western North Carolina, United States, in McDowell County. It is fed by the waters of Buck Creek, a tributary of the Catawba River. The lake is about 5 miles (8.0 km) northwest of Marion.

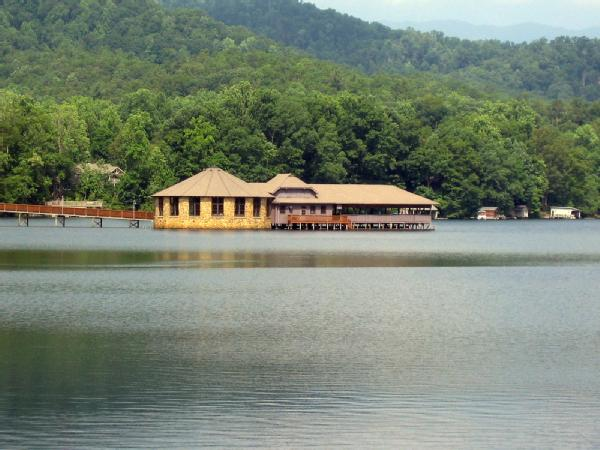
The Casino on Lake Tahoma

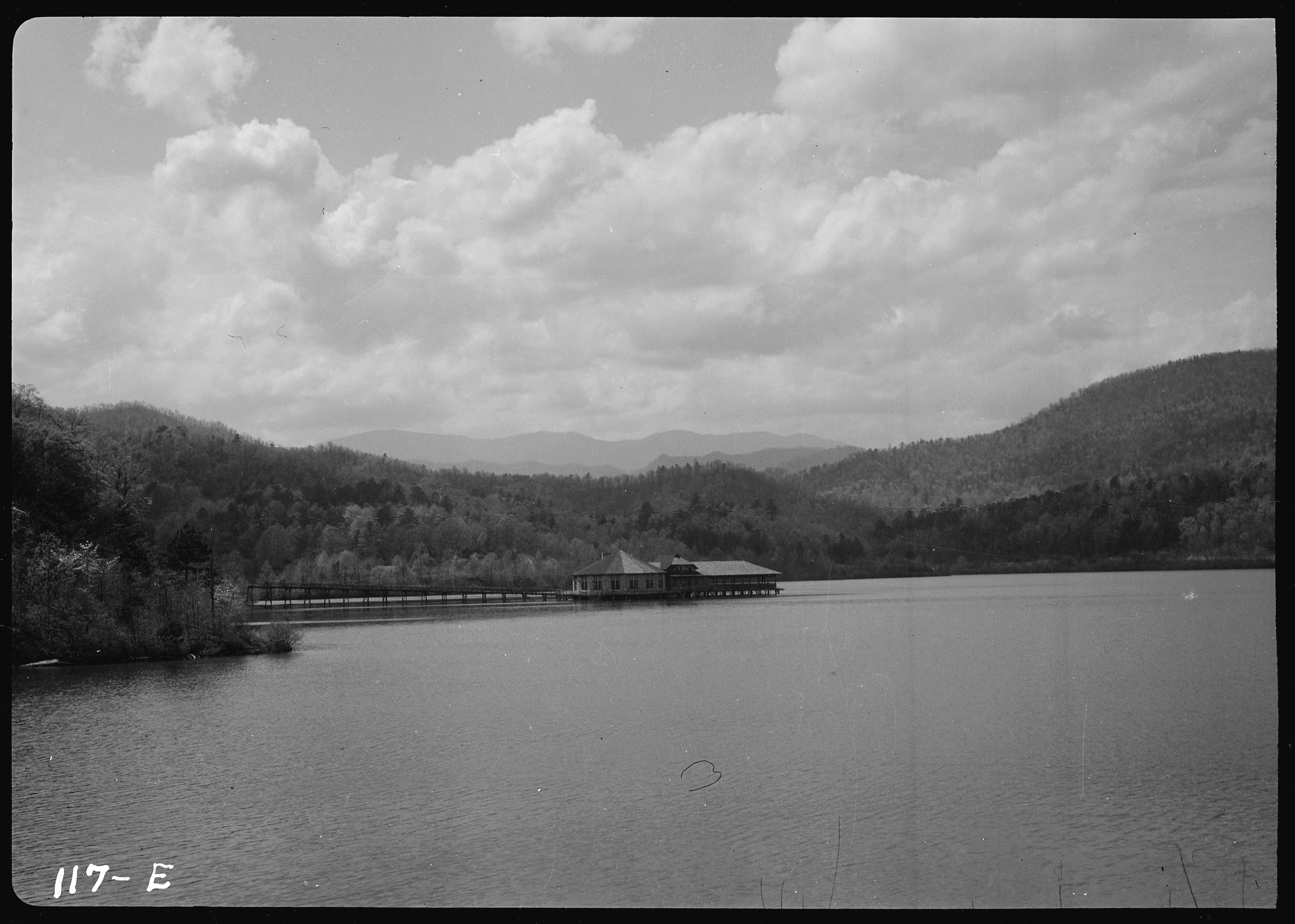
Lake Tahoma and Pavilion, Black Mountain in background, 1936
