= Henry Seawell Brown and Mary Jane English Farmstead =

Historic house in North Carolina, United States

- U.S. National Register of Historic Places
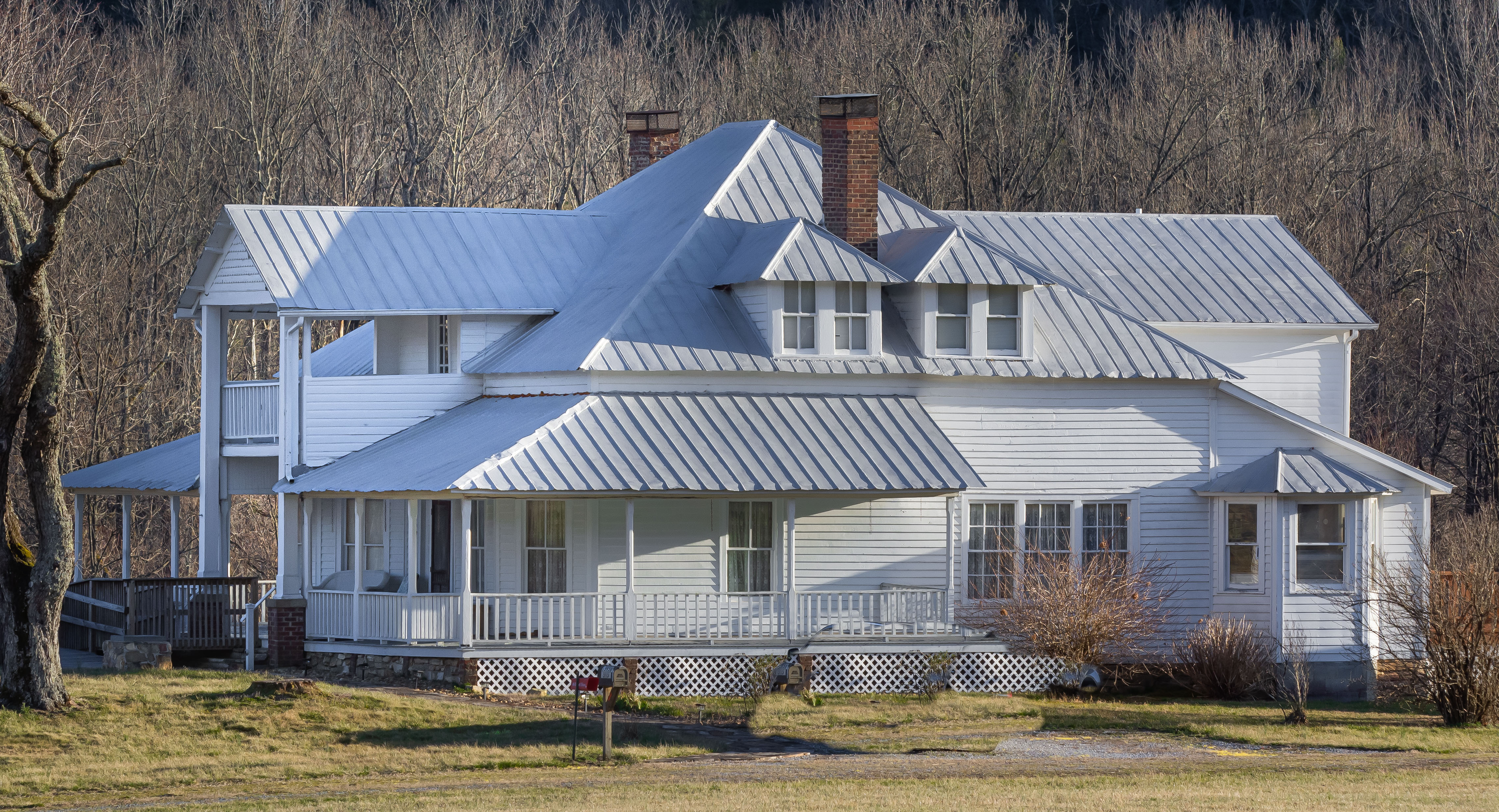

- Location within North Carolina Location within the United States
- Location: 15956 U.S. Route 221 North, near Ashford, North Carolina
- Coordinates: 35°51′57″N 81°57′13″W
- Area: 21 acres (8.5 ha)
- Built: 1916
- Architectural style: Queen Anne, Colonial Revival
- NRHP reference No.: 09000685
- Added to NRHP: September 3, 2009

Henry Seawell Brown and Mary Jane English Farmstead, also known as the Brown Family Farm, is a historic home and farm located near Ashford, McDowell County, North Carolina. The farmhouse was built in 1916, and is 1 1/2-story, three-bay, frame dwelling with Queen Anne and Colonial Revival style design elements. It has a two-story portico, triangular pedimented front gable, hip-roofed dormers, fish-scale shingles, and one-story wraparound front porch. It has a two-story rear ell. Also on the property are a contributing barn and garage (1920s).

It was listed on the National Register of Historic Places in 2009.
