= Carson–Young House =

Historic house in North Carolina, United States

- Carson-Young House
- U.S. National Register of Historic Places
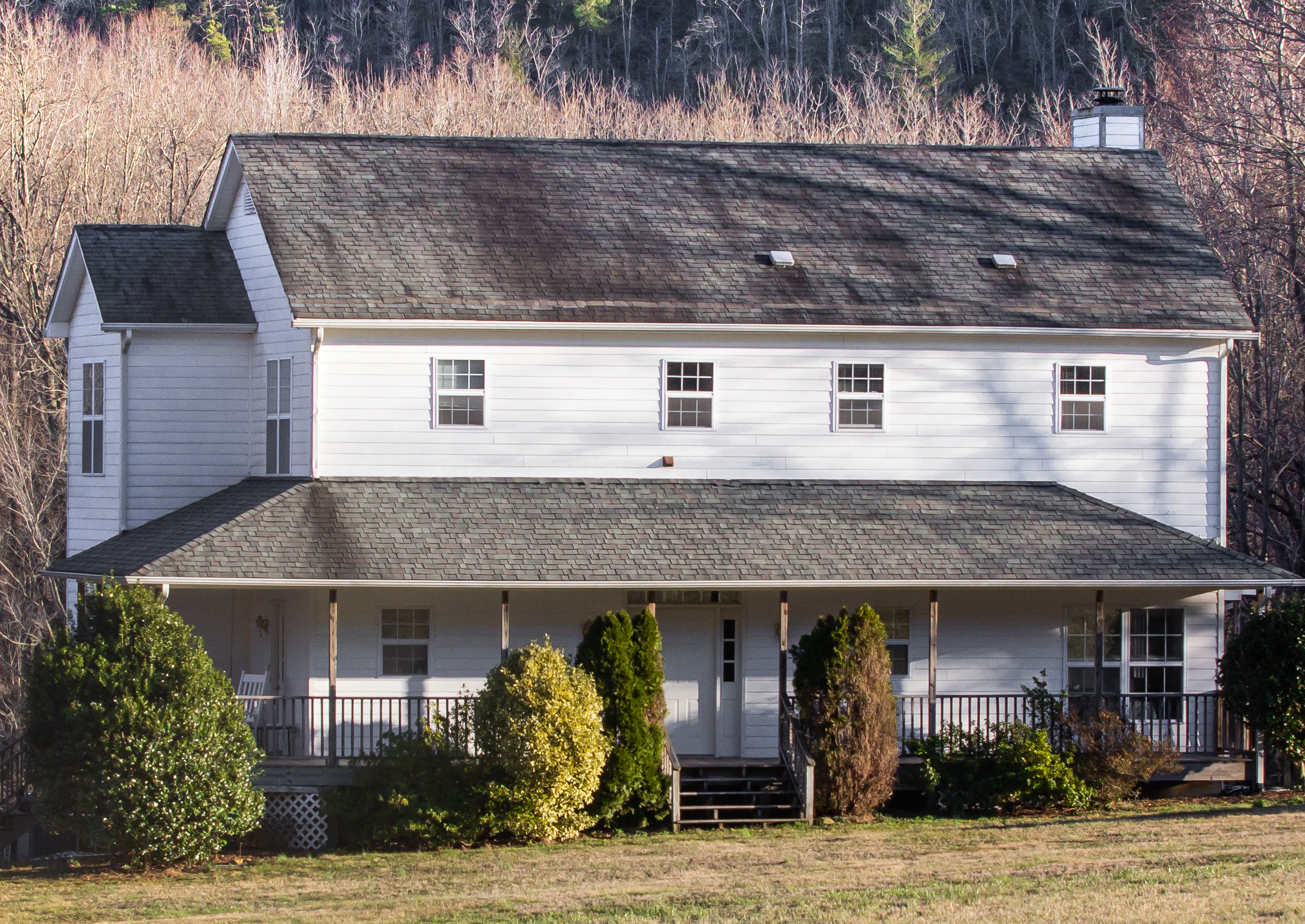

- Location within North Carolina Location within the United States
- Location: 842 Major Conley Rd., near Marion, North Carolina
- Coordinates: 35°42′25″N 82°03′16″W
- Area: 12.72 acres (5.15 ha)
- Built: c. 1860
- Architectural style: Greek Revival, I-house
- NRHP reference No.: 11000483
- Added to NRHP: July 28, 2011

Carson–Young House is a historic home located near Marion, McDowell County, North Carolina. It was built about 1860, and is two-story, three-bay, frame I-house with Greek Revival style design influences. A one-story, hip-roofed rear addition was built about 1951. It features a central, one-bay-wide, two-story porch is capped with a full pediment roof. Also on the property is a contributing two-story, brick schoolhouse (c. 1860) and barn.

It was listed on the National Register of Historic Places in 2011.
