= West Marion, North Carolina =

- Census-designated place
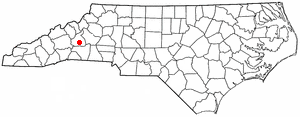
- Location in North Carolina
- Coordinates: 35°39′09″N 82°01′08″W
- Country: United States
- State: North Carolina
- County: McDowell

Area
  - Total: 1.48 sq mi (3.84 km^{2})
  - Land: 1.48 sq mi (3.84 km^{2})
  - Water: 0 sq mi (0.00 km^{2})
- Elevation: 1,496 ft (456 m)

Population (2020)
  - Total: 1,226
  - Density: 826/sq mi (318.9/km^{2})
- Time zone: UTC-5 (Eastern (EST))
  - Summer (DST): UTC-4 (EDT)
- ZIP Code: 28752 (Marion)
- FIPS code: 37-72600
- GNIS feature ID: 2403007

West Marion is an unincorporated community and census-designated place (CDP) in McDowell County, North Carolina, United States, adjacent to the city of Marion, the county seat. The population of West Marion was 1,226 at the 2020 census, down from 1,348 in 2010.

== Geography ==
West Marion is in central McDowell County, bordered to the north and west by the city of Marion and to the south by Interstate 40. Downtown Marion is 3 miles (5 km) to the north-northeast. I-40 is accessed by Exit 81 (Sugar Hill Road) just to the southwest of the community.

According to the U.S. Census Bureau, the West Marion CDP has a total area of 1.5 square miles (3.9 km^{2}), all land. The area has dropped from 1.9 square miles (4.9 km^{2}) at the 2000 census as the city of Marion has annexed land along Sugar Hill Road.

== Demographics ==
Historical population
Census	Pop.	Note	%±
1950	1,233		—
1960	2,335		89.4%
1970	3,034		29.9%
1980	1,596		−47.4%
1990	1,291		−19.1%
2000	1,556		20.5%
2010	1,348		−13.4%
2020	1,226		−9.1%
U.S. Decennial Census

As of the census of 2000, there were 1,556 people, 677 households, and 459 families residing in the CDP. The population density was 831.2 inhabitants per square mile (320.9/km^{2}). There were 731 housing units at an average density of 390.5 per square mile (150.8/km^{2}). The racial makeup of the CDP was 91.26% White, 5.14% African American, 0.45% Native American, 0.13% Asian, 1.67% from other races, and 1.35% from two or more races. Hispanic or Latino of any race were 2.19% of the population.

There were 677 households, out of which 28.1% had children under the age of 18 living with them, 51.7% were married couples living together, 11.8% had a female householder with no husband present, and 32.2% were non-families. 27.3% of all households were made up of individuals, and 12.1% had someone living alone who was 65 years of age or older. The average household size was 2.30 and the average family size was 2.76.

In the CDP, the population was spread out, with 22.1% under the age of 18, 8.6% from 18 to 24, 28.1% from 25 to 44, 25.3% from 45 to 64, and 15.8% who were 65 years of age or older. The median age was 38 years. For every 100 females, there were 85.2 males. For every 100 females age 18 and over, there were 83.9 males.

The median income for a household in the CDP was $26,151, and the median income for a family was $31,953. Males had a median income of $22,263 versus $19,816 for females. The per capita income for the CDP was $15,087. About 16.3% of families and 17.8% of the population were below the poverty line, including 33.4% of those under age 18 and 17.6% of those age 65 or over.
