= Lone Beech =

Historic house in North Carolina, United States

- U.S. National Register of Historic Places
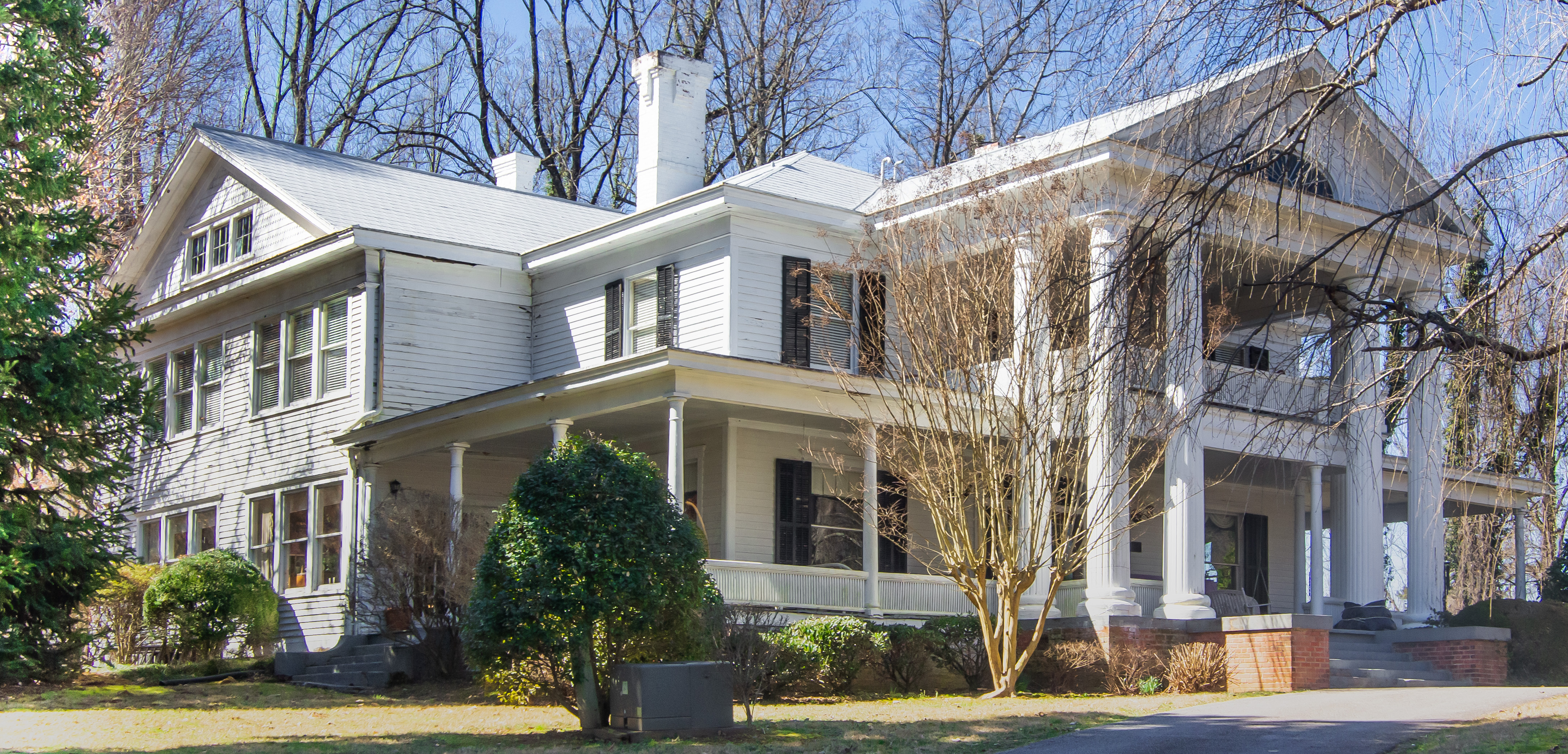

- Location within North Carolina Location within the United States
- Location: 206 Hillcrest Dr., Marion, North Carolina
- Coordinates: 35°41′7″N 82°0′47″W
- Area: 2 acres (0.81 ha)
- Built: c. 1912-1915
- Architectural style: Classical Revival
- NRHP reference No.: 95000639
- Added to NRHP: June 2, 1995

Lone Beech is a historic home located at Marion, McDowell County, North Carolina. It was built between about 1912 and 1915. It is two-story, Neoclassical style dwelling with a broad pedimented two-story ell. It features a two-story pedimented portico, supported by six fluted Tuscan order columns and a one-story wrap-around porch. Also on the property are the contributing one-story frame servant's cottage (c. 1912), barn (c. 1912), and privy (c. 1912).

It was listed on the National Register of Historic Places in 1995.
