= Linville Caverns =

Limestone caverns in North Carolina, U.S.

Coordinates: 35.9165°N 81.9377°W

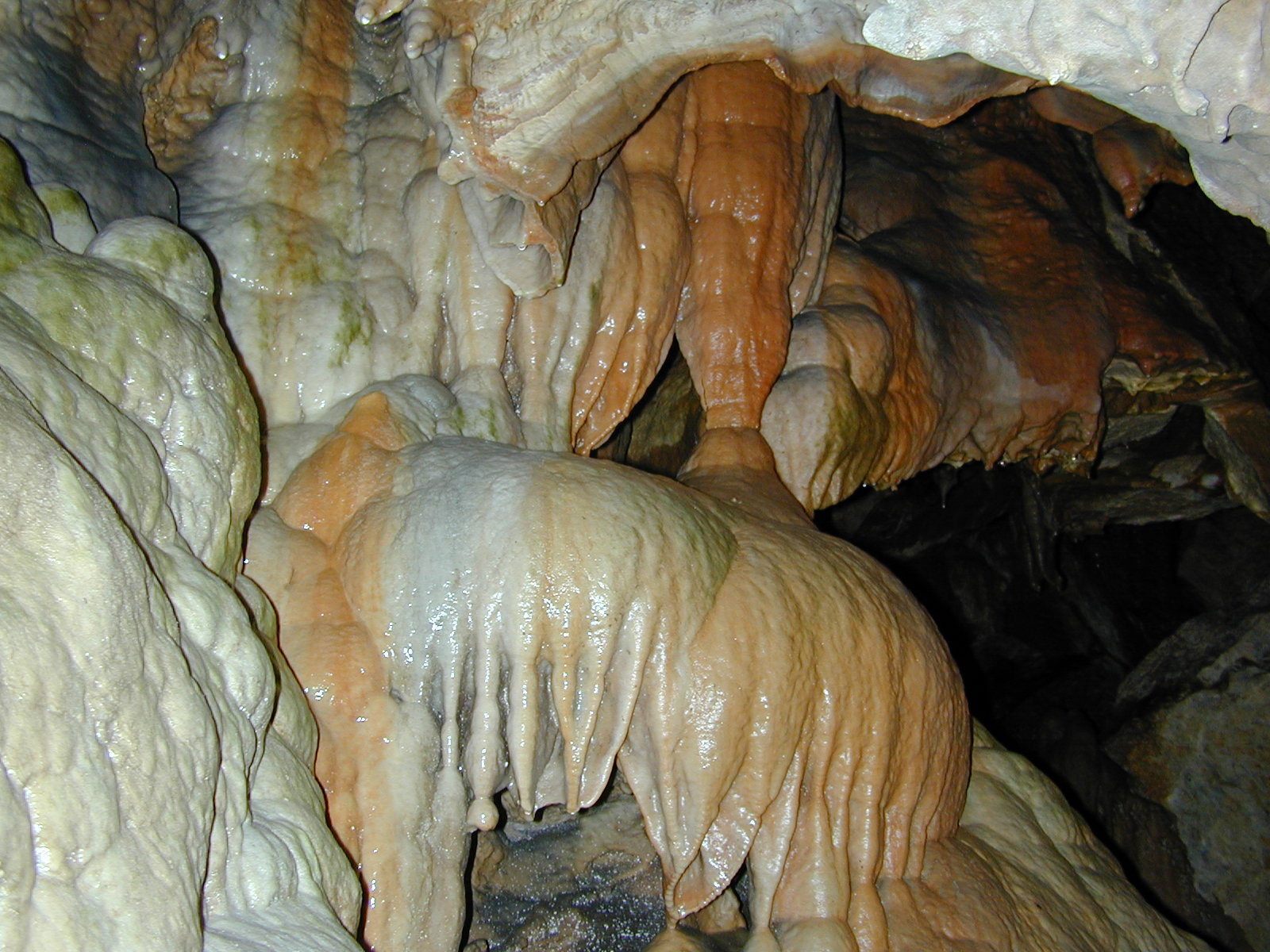
From Linville Caverns

Linville Caverns are privately owned active limestone caverns located in northern McDowell County, North Carolina, just south of the village of Linville Falls, on U.S. Highway 221. The caverns are open to the public year-round for guided tours. Linville Caverns have been open for tours since the late 1930s and remain the only show caverns in North Carolina.

The caverns were discovered in 1822, by local fishermen, and since that time have been of interest to locals and travelers alike. Half hour guided tours escort visitors through the caverns with information about cavern history, resident creatures, and the formations viewed along the way. Formed in a deposit of Shady Dolomite at the base of Humpback Mountain, Linville Caverns offer an environment for the public to explore the subterranean world of the Blue Ridge Mountains. Visitors hear the lore surrounding the caverns, including the tale of the Civil War deserters who used the caverns as a hideout, as well as the geology of the stalactites, stalagmites, and other formations found on the tour route.

In the fall and winter months, caverns visitors may be able to view the caverns' most popular residents, the tricolored bats and little brown bats. These insect-eating creatures hibernate in the caverns from late fall until early spring.

White-nose syndrome, a disease caused by the fungus Pseudogymnoascus destructans, was discovered among the bats that roost in Linville Cavern during the winter months. While harmless to humans and domestic animals, the fungus is deadly to bats. The visitor center takes steps to mitigate the spread of the fungus by asking guests to step in a bleach solution that kills any fungus on the soles of their shoes.
