= McDowell Technical Community College =

College in Marion, North Carolina, U.S.

- Type: Public community college
- Established: 1967; 59 years ago
- Parent institution: North Carolina Community College System
- President: Brian S. Merritt
- Location: Marion, North Carolina, United States; 35.879307°N 77.573660°W
- Website: www.mcdowelltech.edu

McDowell Technical Community College is a public community college in Marion, North Carolina. It is part of the North Carolina Community College System.

== History ==
McDowell Technical Community College was founded in 1964 as a satellite of Asheville-Buncombe Technical Institute. In 1971, McDowell received its own independent charter becoming a separate community college. MTCC has since continued to expand to include new buildings and a walking trail in 2015. In 2018, the college opened a new laboratory to educate and train students for a myriad of careers in the health field.

== Academics ==
MTCC offers a wide range of degrees and certificates. There is also an adult education program.
