= Joseph "Pleasant Gardens" McDowell =

American politician (1758–1795)

Joseph McDowell

Member of the U.S. House of Representatives from North Carolina's 1st district
- In office March 4, 1793 – March 3, 1795
- Preceded by: John Steele
- Succeeded by: James Holland

Personal details
- Born: February 15, 1758
- Died: May 18, 1795 (aged 37) Burke County, North Carolina, U.S. (now McDowell County)
- Relatives: Joseph McDowell Jr. (cousin)
- Nickname: Pleasant Gardens

Joseph "Pleasant Gardens" McDowell (February 25, 1758 – May 18, 1795) was an American lawyer, soldier, and statesman from Morganton, North Carolina.

His estate was named "Pleasant Gardens", and he was nicknamed "Pleasant Gardens" Joe to distinguish him from his cousin, Joseph "Quaker Meadows" McDowell. The two men are not always clearly distinguished in historical records: both were at the 1780 Battle of Kings Mountain, one as a major leading the Burke County militia, and the other in a subordinate role as a captain. Although "Quaker Meadows" Joe is usually hailed as the Major McDowell who was the hero of the battle, some descendants of "Pleasant Gardens" Joe maintain that it was their ancestor who led the Burke County militia, a claim which is contradicted by contemporary evidence.

"Pleasant Gardens" McDowell was later appointed a North Carolina militia general, and served in the 3rd United States Congress from 1793 to 1795. However, these accomplishments are sometimes credited to Joseph "Quaker Meadows" McDowell, although the Dictionary of American Biography notes that the Congressional directory may be correct.

He was a delegate from Burke County to both the Hillsborough Convention of 1788 and the Fayetteville Convention of 1789 that approved the United States Constitution.

McDowell died on May 18, 1795, on his estate in what was Burke County, North Carolina, but is now part of McDowell County, North Carolina.

U.S. House of Representatives
Preceded by John Steele	Member of the U.S. House of Representatives from North Carolina's 1st congressional district 1793–1795	Succeeded by James Holland
