= McDowell County Courthouse (North Carolina) =

Historic courthouse in North Carolina, US

- U.S. National Register of Historic Places
- U.S. Historic district – Contributing property
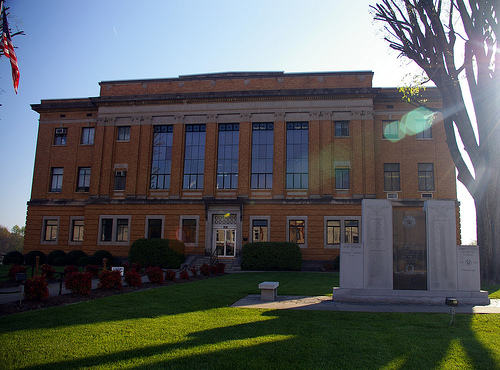
- McDowell County Courthouse, February 2009

- Location within North Carolina Location within the United States
- Location: Main and E. Court Sts., Marion, North Carolina
- Coordinates: 35°41′2″N 82°0′32″W
- Area: 1.1 acres (0.45 ha)
- Built: 1921-1923
- Built by: Southern Ferro Concrete Co.
- Architect: Stillwell, Erle G.
- Architectural style: Classical Revival
- MPS: North Carolina County Courthouses TR
- NRHP reference No.: 79003131
- Added to NRHP: May 10, 1979

McDowell County Courthouse is a historic courthouse building located at Marion, McDowell County, North Carolina. It was designed by architect Erle G. Stillwell and built between 1921 and 1923. It is three-story, late Neoclassical building sheathed in yellow brick. The rectangular structure is composed of a central block flanked by slightly recessed, unornamented wings.

It was listed on the National Register of Historic Places in 1979. It is located in the Main Street Historic District.
