= Carson House (Marion, North Carolina) =

Historic house in North Carolina, United States

- U.S. National Register of Historic Places
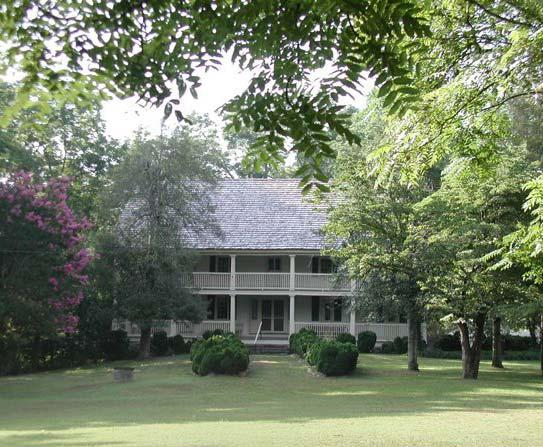

- Location within North Carolina Location within the United States
- Location: 1805 Highway 70 West Marion, North Carolina
- Coordinates: 35°41′30″N 82°03′27″W
- Area: 9.07 acres (3.67 ha)( Including Round Hill Cemetery)
- Built: c. 1793
- NRHP reference No.: 70000843
- Added to NRHP: September 15, 1970

The Carson House is a historic house and museum located in Marion, North Carolina. It was the home of Col. John Hazzard Carson, and served as the McDowell County courthouse when the county was first organized in 1842.

== Description ==
Built in 1793, the Carson House is one of the oldest standing structures in Marion, along with the nearby Joseph McDowell House. Large walnut logs were harvested from nearby Buck Creek to construct the massive three-story plantation house.

Between 1804 and 1827, the area now known as McDowell County was a large producer of gold, and people from all over the country came to "strike it rich" before the California Gold Rush of 1849. The 1843 meeting to formally organize McDowell County, from sections of the counties of Burke and Rutherford counties, took place in the home of Col. John Carson. The new county was named after Col. Joseph McDowell, the hero of the American Revolution at the Battle of King's Mountain.

Originally, the county commissioners wanted the county seat to be located near the Carson House, but concerns about disrupting plantation life resulted in the Carson family donating 50 acres (200,000 m^{2}) a few miles east for the county seat. Col. John Carson's son, Joseph McDowell Carson, built Green River Plantation near Columbus, Polk County, North Carolina.

For many years, the Carson House served as a stagecoach inn and social center. Important historical figures such as Davy Crockett, Sam Houston, and Andrew Jackson stopped here. The latter reportedly lost money gambling on the horses that raced at the Carson Plantation. Dan Kanipe, one of the two survivors of General Custer's unit in the Battle of Little Bighorn, lived in Marion. For some time he lived at the Carson House.

The property was bought in the late 1800s by John Seawell Brown, and was preserved by three generations of the Brown family. Brown was a three-term North Carolina State Senator who was instrumental in the founding of McDowell County.

The Carson House was listed on the National Register of Historic Places in 1970.

After extensive renovations, the house was opened to the public in 1964 as a museum and library. The Carson House maintains a unique collection of research materials and books, along with dozens of family histories. The Mary M. Greenlee Genealogical Research and History Room has been a part of the house since the early 1970s, and is constantly adding to its archives. Today, The Carson House is listed on the National Register of Historic Places, and is open to the public as a museum. In 2007, it was listed as a certified destination on the NC Civil War Trails Program.

== John Hazzard Carson ==
John "Hazzard" Carson served in the North Carolina militia during the American Revolution. His military record included the following positions:

- March 1776, enlisted March, ensign, 2nd Rowan County Regiment. under Captain William Moore, Reuben White and Joseph McDowell
- 1776, Forage Master under General Griffith Rutherford
- 1776: Volunteer, William Moore's company of Col. Christopher Beekmans Rowan County Regiment
- 1776: Cross Creek Expedition.
- July 3, 1776: skirmish against Native Americans (Cherokee siege of McDowell's Station), North Fork of the Catawba; Capt. Rueben White.
- 1777: under Capt. William Moore, Cherokee actions.
- 1778: under Capt. Joseph McDowell, Indian actions (later married McDowell's widow, Mary Moffett McDowell)
- 1781: Forage Master under Brig. Gen. Griffith Rutherford and Col. Charles McDowell
- 1782: paymaster, Burke County Regiment

He may have attained the rank of colonel after the Revolutionary War.
