= Main Street Historic District (Marion, North Carolina) =

Historic district in North Carolina, United States

- U.S. National Register of Historic Places
- U.S. Historic district
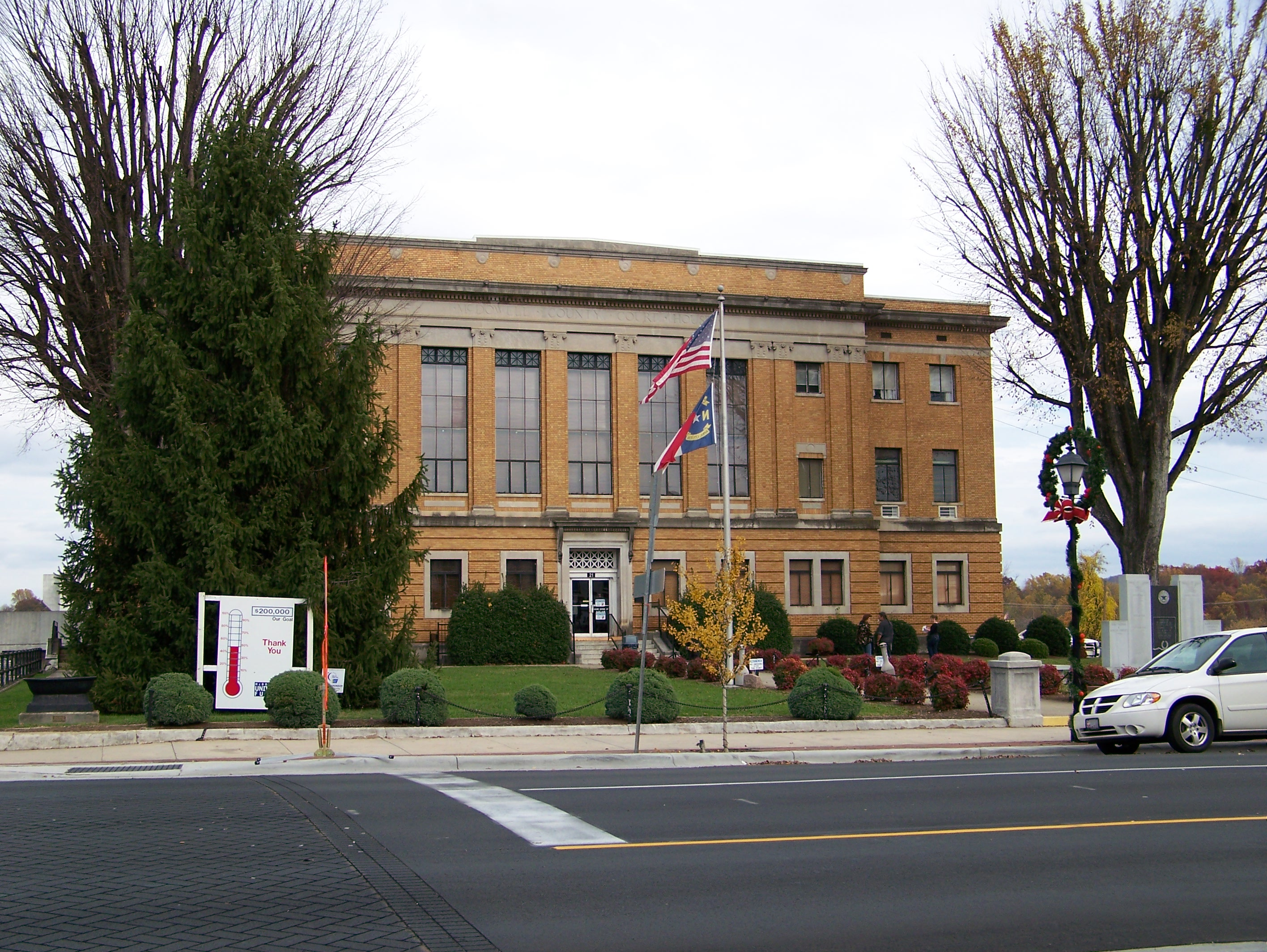
- McDowell County Courthouse

- Location within North Carolina Location within the United States
- Location: Roughly bounded by US 70 and Garden, State and Logan Sts., Marion, North Carolina
- Coordinates: 35°41′4″N 82°0′35″W
- Area: 21 acres (8.5 ha)
- Built: 1894
- Architect: Stillwell, Erle
- Architectural style: Chicago, Classical Revival, Commercial Style
- MPS: Downtown Marion MPS
- NRHP reference No.: 91000292
- Added to NRHP: March 28, 1991

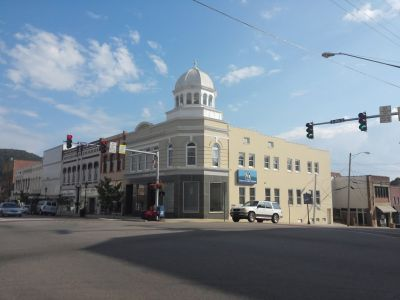
Fifth Third Bank-Former First National Bank, 2016

The Main Street Historic District is a 21-acre (8.5 ha) national historic district located at Marion, McDowell County, North Carolina. It was listed on the National Register of Historic Places in 1991. In 1991, it included 36 buildings deemed to contribute to the historic character of the area and one other contributing site.

Specifically included in the Main Street Historic District are: one church: First Baptist (1914); two former hotels: the Eagle Hotel, which survived the 1894 fire, and the Hotel Marianna (1910); a bank on Main Street built in 1903; the McDowell County Courthouse, which was constructed in 1928; the Public Library (1937), which was originally built as a post office; and the Marion Community Building, built in 1937. Projects are currently underway to revitalize the downtown area as well as to maintain and restore the character of the long-standing buildings.
