= Marion, North Carolina =

- City
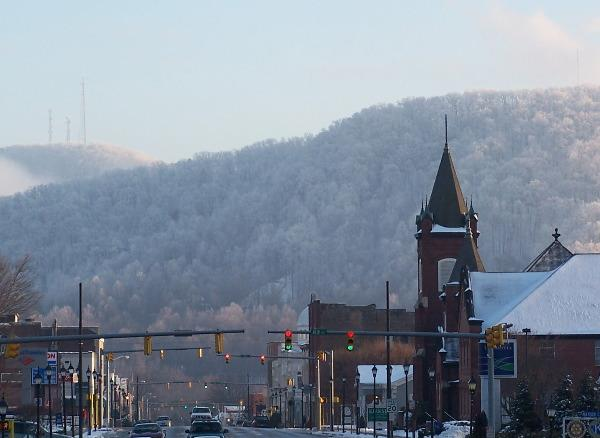
- Downtown Marion

- Seal
- Motto: "Where Main Street Meets the Mountains"
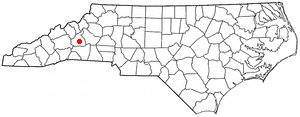
- Location of Marion, North Carolina
- Coordinates: 35°40′39″N 82°00′05″W
- Country: United States
- State: North Carolina
- County: McDowell
- Founded: 1844
- Named for: Francis Marion

Government
  - Mayor: Steve Little

Area
  - Total: 6.00 sq mi (15.55 km^{2})
  - Land: 5.97 sq mi (15.47 km^{2})
  - Water: 0.031 sq mi (0.08 km^{2})
- Elevation: 1,329 ft (405 m)

Population (2020)
  - Total: 7,717
  - Density: 1,292/sq mi (498.8/km^{2})
- Time zone: UTC-5 (Eastern (EST))
  - Summer (DST): UTC-4 (EDT)
- ZIP codes: 28752
- Area code: 828
- FIPS code: 37-41420
- GNIS feature ID: 2405024
- Website: www.marionnc.org

Marion is a city in and the county seat of McDowell County, North Carolina, United States. Founded in 1844, the city was named in honor of Brigadier General Francis Marion, the American Revolutionary War Hero whose talent in guerrilla warfare earned him the name "Swamp Fox". Marion's Main Street Historic District is listed on the National Register of Historic Places. The population was 7,717 at the 2020 Census.

== Geography ==
According to the United States Census Bureau, the city has a total area of 5.6 square miles (15 km^{2}).

== Demographics ==
Historical population
Census	Pop.	Note	%±
1880	372		—
1890	799		114.8%
1900	1,116		39.7%
1910	1,519		36.1%
1920	1,784		17.4%
1930	2,467		38.3%
1940	2,889		17.1%
1950	2,740		−5.2%
1960	3,345		22.1%
1970	3,335		−0.3%
1980	3,684		10.5%
1990	4,765		29.3%
2000	4,943		3.7%
2010	7,838		58.6%
2020	7,717		−1.5%
2025 (est.)	7,440	▼	−3.6%
U.S. Decennial Census

=== 2020 census ===
As of the 2020 census, Marion had a population of 7,717, with 2,844 households and 1,879 families residing in the city. The median age was 38.8 years. 20.2% of residents were under the age of 18 and 17.7% were 65 years of age or older. For every 100 females, there were 120.6 males, and for every 100 females age 18 and over there were 122.1 males.

88.5% of residents lived in urban areas, while 11.5% lived in rural areas.

Of all households, 29.1% had children under the age of 18 living in them. 34.6% were married-couple households, 20.7% were households with a male householder and no spouse or partner present, and 36.9% were households with a female householder and no spouse or partner present. About 36.1% of all households were made up of individuals, and 17.2% had someone living alone who was 65 years of age or older.

There were 3,142 housing units, of which 10.5% were vacant. The homeowner vacancy rate was 1.1% and the rental vacancy rate was 3.9%.

Marion racial composition
Race/ Ethnicity	Number	Percentage
White (non-Hispanic)	5,208	67.49%
Black or African American (non-Hispanic)	928	12.03%
Native American	29	0.38%
Asian	91	1.18%
Other/Mixed	270	3.5%
Hispanic or Latino	1,191	15.43%

=== 2010 census ===
As of the 2010 Census, there were 7,838 people, 2,146 households, and 1,283 families residing in the city. The population density was 1,441.9 inhabitants per square mile (556.7/km^{2}). There were 2,351 housing units at an average density of 690.7 per square mile (266.7/km^{2}). The racial makeup of the city was 83.23% White, 10.54% Black, 0.28% Native American, 1.05% Asian, 0.04% Pacific Islander, 3.82% from other races, and 1.03% from two or more races. Hispanic or Latino of any race were 7.04% of the population.

There were 2,146 households, out of which 24.4% had children under the age of 18 living with them, 41.1% were married couples living together, 14.6% had a female householder with no husband present, and 40.2% were non-families. 37.0% of all households were made up of individuals, and 20.4% had someone living alone who was 65 years of age or older. The average household size was 2.19 and the average family size was 2.84.

In the city, the population was spread out, with 20.7% under the age of 18, 8.1% from 18 to 24, 27.5% from 25 to 44, 23.0% from 45 to 64, and 20.6% who were 65 years of age or older. The median age was 40 years. For every 100 females, there were 82.8 males. For every 100 females age 18 and over, there were 79.6 males.

The median income for a household in the city was $24,753, and the median income for a family was $35,463. Males had a median income of $25,403 versus $21,671 for females. The per capita income for the city was $16,569. About 12.6% of families and 17.3% of the population were below the poverty line, including 23.5% of those under age 18 and 21.8% of those age 65 or over.

== Climate ==
With an elevation of 1,400 feet (430 m), Marion's climate is fairly warm during summer (which are typically longer than lower elevation areas in the United States that get the same average high and low temperatures in the summer), when temperatures tend to be in the 80s °F (high 20s °C) and 90s °F (30s °C), and moderately cold during the winter, with temperatures typically in the 30s (-0-+5 °C) and 40s (5-10 °C).

The annual average precipitation at Marion is 54 inches (1,400 mm). Rainfall is fairly evenly distributed throughout the year, with the wettest month of the year being March with an average rainfall of 5.59 inches (142 mm).

Climate data for Marion, North Carolina (1991–2020)
Month	Jan	Feb	Mar	Apr	May	Jun	Jul	Aug	Sep	Oct	Nov	Dec	Year
Mean daily maximum °F (°C)	48.9 (9.4)	52.9 (11.6)	60.5 (15.8)	69.8 (21.0)	76.2 (24.6)	82.2 (27.9)	85.3 (29.6)	84.1 (28.9)	79.1 (26.2)	69.8 (21.0)	60.1 (15.6)	51.4 (10.8)	68.4 (20.2)
Daily mean °F (°C)	38.6 (3.7)	42.1 (5.6)	49.0 (9.4)	57.9 (14.4)	65.4 (18.6)	72.7 (22.6)	76.0 (24.4)	75.0 (23.9)	69.5 (20.8)	58.7 (14.8)	49.0 (9.4)	41.2 (5.1)	57.9 (14.4)
Mean daily minimum °F (°C)	28.3 (−2.1)	31.2 (−0.4)	37.4 (3.0)	45.9 (7.7)	54.7 (12.6)	63.2 (17.3)	66.7 (19.3)	65.8 (18.8)	59.9 (15.5)	47.6 (8.7)	37.8 (3.2)	31.0 (−0.6)	47.5 (8.6)
Average precipitation inches (mm)	4.69 (119)	3.65 (93)	4.33 (110)	4.90 (124)	5.30 (135)	5.47 (139)	5.13 (130)	5.18 (132)	4.75 (121)	4.09 (104)	4.18 (106)	4.91 (125)	56.58 (1,438)
Average snowfall inches (cm)	1.9 (4.8)	2.1 (5.3)	1.4 (3.6)	0.0 (0.0)	0.0 (0.0)	0.0 (0.0)	0.0 (0.0)	0.0 (0.0)	0.0 (0.0)	0.0 (0.0)	0.0 (0.0)	1.7 (4.3)	7.1 (18)
Source: NOAA

Bustling Downtown Marion in the 1920s

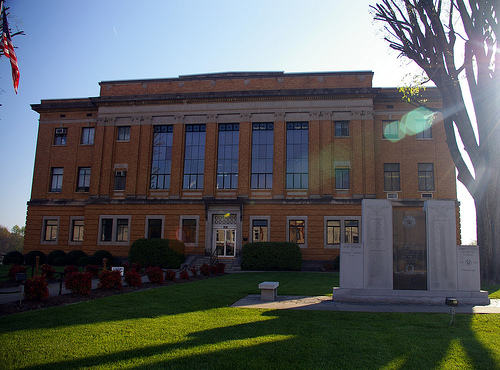
McDowell County Courthouse

Looking down Main Street in Marion

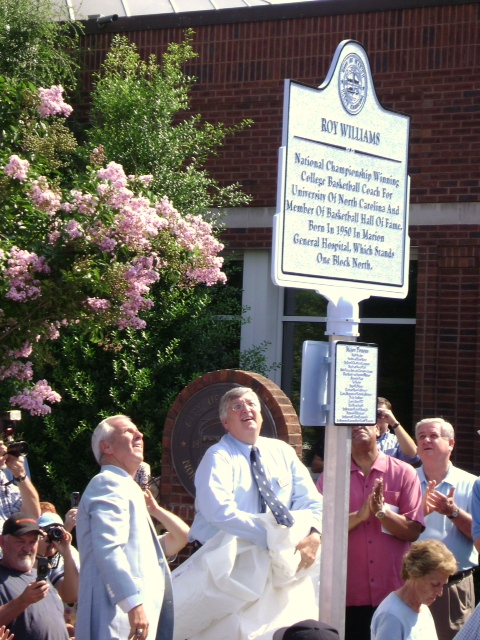
UNC Coach Roy Williams at his Historical Marker dedication in 2011

== History ==
Marion, the county seat of McDowell County, was planned and built on land selected by the first McDowell County Commissioners on March 14, 1844 at the Historic Carson House on Buck Creek. It was not until 1845, however, that the official name of Marion was sanctioned as the county seat by the state legislature. The name of Marion came from Brigadier General Francis Marion, the American Revolutionary War hero, known as the "Swamp Fox" and the man upon whom the movie The Patriot was based. Marion was also home to Sgt. Daniel Kanipe, one of only two survivors of the Battle of Little Bighorn. An historical marker was placed in front of his former home in 2011. The nearby Lake James is a local tourist attraction, and has been the backdrop for movies such as The Last of the Mohicans and The Hunt for Red October.

Another famous house in Marion is the Joseph McDowell House, built in 1787 by the county's namesake, Joseph McDowell. McDowell played a large role in the Battle of Cowpens when he helped defeat the British in January 1781. McDowell went on to serve as a member of the North Carolina Constitutional Convention in 1788 and was a member of the 3rd United States Congress. Restoration plans are underway to preserve this historic house and ensure that it remains a vital part of Marion's history. In 2010, the Joseph McDowell Greenway opened to the public along the Catawba River, and will soon link the two most historic homes in McDowell County, the Joseph McDowell House and the Carson House.

The Big Fire

Until the late 19th century, Main Street was a collection of mostly wooden huts, houses, and buildings. On Sunday morning, November 25, 1894 a fire sprang up in an old building known as the "Ark" located behind the Courthouse. The fire spread to Main Street and rushed down the street at an incredible pace. The wooden buildings were quickly consumed by the enormous inferno. The few brick buildings on Main Street were also gutted, and because there was no public water supply, bucket brigades were hurriedly formed to halt the advance of the fire. It was not enough, however, and most of Main Street was burned to the ground. Showing the resiliency possessed by the citizens, the city came together and took on the rebuilding process, making Marion larger and stronger than before. Today, downtown Marion is listed in the National Register of Historic Places.

Depression Era & Labor Conflict

On Oct. 2, 1929, the McDowell County sheriff and several deputies faced a group of workers outside the fence in front of the Marion Manufacturing Company, whose 600 employees had been on strike for four months. A gunfight quickly ensued between the two groups. Sheriff Oscar Adkins would later swear in court that the strikers opened fire first, although no weapons were ever found on any of the strikers. 36 strikers were shot, six mortally, during the confrontation. Sinclair Lewis wrote a syndicated newspaper report entitled "Cheap and Contented Labor: The Picture of the Southern Mill Town." He concluded: "The workers, especially in Marion, have become discouraged. They are hungry, tired, bewildered. They are sick of being shot down. Unless the whole country encourages them [financially], they will crawl back into the slavery I have sought to picture here." However, since the Great Depression was in the immediate future, little such help would arrive.

Historic District

Eleven structures make up the Main Street Historic District in the downtown area, which was listed on the National Register of Historic Places in 1991. Four churches, St. John's Episcopal Church (1882), First Baptist (1914), First Presbyterian (1923), and St. Matthew's Lutheran Church (1935); two former hotels, the Eagle Hotel, which survived the 1894 fire, and the Hotel Marianna (1910); a bank on Main Street built in 1903; the McDowell County Courthouse, which was constructed in 1928; the Marion Depot (1867), which is the oldest surviving depot on the Western Rail Line; the Public Library (1937), which was originally built as a post office; and the Marion Community Building, built in 1937. Also listed on the National Register of Historic Places are the Depot Historic District, Carson House, Carson–Young House, and Lone Beech. Downtown Marion has benefited from recent revitalization, and many new shops, restaurants, and taprooms have opened up along Main Street in recent years.

Marion Today

Marion currently stands as a small congenial town at the edge of the Blue Ridge Mountains, "Where Main Street Meets the Mountains." Just off Interstate 40, Marion is located approximately 35 miles (56 km) east of Asheville and 20 miles (32 km) west of Morganton.

Marion was named "North Carolina Small Town of the Year" for 2018 from the N.C. Rural Center. The Small Town of the Year Award recognizes a town or small city “that embraces citizen engagement, values diversity, and fosters strong partnerships.”

Marion serves as a gateway from Interstate 40 to many nearby attractions and recreation activities in the Blue Ridge Mountains. A contemporary rest area located on the US 221 bypass west of Marion serves as a welcome center for visitors to the area. The rest area and visitor center is staffed with travel counselors during daylight hours. In addition to providing visitor information, it also has picnic facilities and vending machines on the premises.

The Marion Marauders, a Tar Heel League baseball club, were a favorite local attraction in the 1940s and 1950s, and were the home team of star pitcher Kelly Jack Swift, who in 1953 became the last minor league pitcher to ever win 30 games in a season, going 30–7 with a 2.54 ERA. Sports Illustrated published an article about Swift and his accomplishment in its October 17, 2011 edition.

Former University of North Carolina Tar Heels basketball coach and 2007 Basketball Hall of Fame inductee Roy Williams was born and spent a part of his childhood in Marion. On July 18, 2011, the town held a ceremony to dedicate a Carolina blue historical marker downtown in front of City Hall, listing Marion as the birthplace of Coach Williams, as well as his many awards and accomplishments.

Marion continues to be a community that values athletics, especially the "Fightin' Titans" of McDowell High, whose girls' basketball team won the 1992 North Carolina 4A State Championship.

McDowell County and the City of Marion is protected by the Marion Police Department as well as the McDowell County Sheriffs Office.

Marion’s current Police Chief is Allen Lawrence, while the McDowell County Sheriff is Ricky Buchanan.

The Marion Fire department Provides fire protection and a Medium level rescue response throughout its district while also receiving assistance from outlying volunteer department mutual aid responses within as well as outside the county.

The McDowell County Rescue Squad and Ambulance Inc provides rescue services both to the city of Marion and the county as a whole while McDowell County EMS provides paramedic level EMS coverage.

== Education ==
McDowell Technical Community College is located here.

Grades Kindergarten through the 5th grade are available to students typically based geographically as to where they reside in the county. Those elementary schools are: Glenwood, Marion, Nebo, North Cove, Pleasant Gardens, Old Fort, Eastfield and West Marion.

The county is also host to three middle schools which are funneled into by the elementary schools. The three middle schools are East McDowell Middle School, West McDowell Middle School, and Foothills Community School, each hosting 6th-8th Grade.

Upon completion of the 8th Grade, students have the opportunity of attending McDowell High School or choosing between the McDowell Academy for Innovation or the McDowell Early College. Both of which are hosted by McDowell Technical Community College.

== Attractions ==
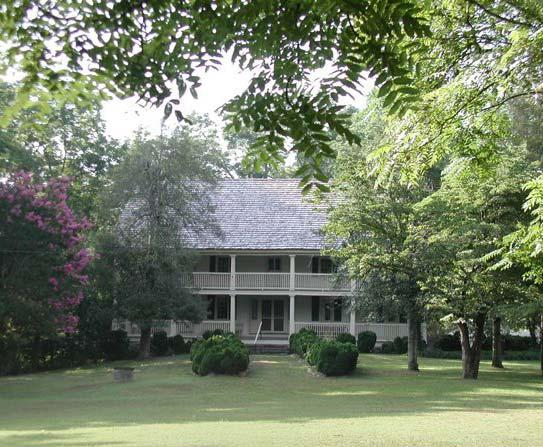
The Carson House, built in 1793

The city operates three parks in Marion, the main one being downtown beside the Community Building. In 2010, the City opened the Joseph McDowell Historical Catawba Greenway. Named in honor of the county's namesake, Colonel Joseph McDowell, the greenway follows the flow of the Catawba River. Benches, picnic tables, fitness stations, fishing piers, and a canoe launch are scattered throughout the three-mile trail. Access points are located at Highway 70 between Highway 221/226 By-Pass and Roby Conley Road, as well as a parking lot at the opposite end behind the Joseph McDowell House.

Historic homes such as the Carson House and the Joseph McDowell House have been preserved to keep the history of Marion alive for decades. They have been open weekdays to the public, but the McDowell House is closed during restoration.

In downtown Marion, the restored Marion Depot, the oldest surviving depot on the Western Rail Line, hosts a number of community events each month, and is available for rental to individuals and groups for meetings, receptions, parties, and other functions. Several golf courses are located outside town, in addition to two waterparks and numerous campgrounds.

Downtown Marion’s most recent change has been the renovation of the Former West Rock plant into a community business complex which plays host to a municipal events center, several business and restaurants. In 2023 the Miller Complex hosted famous musician Oliver Anthony who became widely known for his song “Rich Men North of Richmond”

Nearby Lake James provides fishing, camping, and recreation for residents of McDowell and Burke counties. Lake Tahoma, Linville Caverns, Linville Falls, Catawba Falls, and the Blue Ridge Parkway are also close to town, and exhibit the diverse scenery of Western North Carolina.

== Notable people ==
- Richard Erwin – United States federal judge and politician who was the first African American to be elected to statewide office in North Carolina
- Gus Greenlee – became a highly successful businessman in Pittsburgh, Pennsylvania; bought the Pittsburgh Crawfords baseball team, founded the second Negro National League, and built Greenlee Field, one of the few ballparks owned by a black team
- Mitch Gillespie – politician and small business owner
- Greg Holland – MLB pitcher and 3x All-Star selection
- Robert C. Hunter – Judge of the North Carolina Court of Appeals, from 1998 through 2014
- Dwayne Ledford – former NFL player, current Offensive Line Coach for the Atlanta Falcons
- Barbara Loden – Broadway Tony Award-winning American stage and film actress model, and stage/film director
- Sara McMann – MMA fighter and Olympic silver medalist in women's freestyle wrestling at the 2004 Summer Olympics
- Orlando Meléndez – basketball player for the Harlem Globetrotters
- Roy Williams – former head coach for the University of North Carolina Tar Heels men's basketball team

== Media ==
- Newspaper: The McDowell News
- Radio: WBRM – 1250 AM, 103.9 FM
- The News Bulletin of McDowell County

Marion is part of the Greenville/Spartanburg, South Carolina/Asheville, North Carolina television market.
