= McDowell County, North Carolina =

County in North Carolina, United States

- County
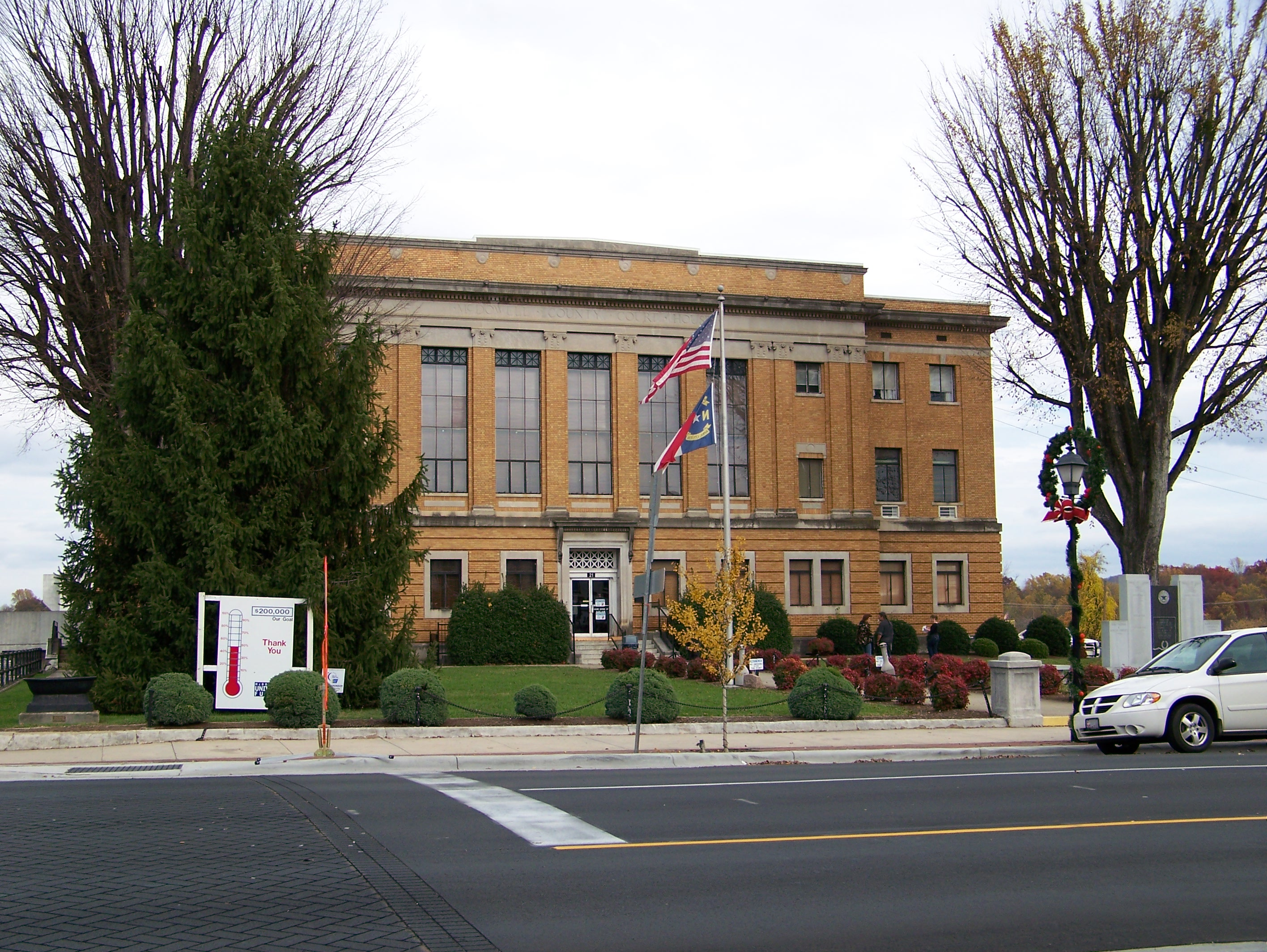
- McDowell County Courthouse in Marion

- Flag Seal

- Location within the U.S. state of North Carolina
- Coordinates: 35.68°N 82.05°W
- Country: United States
- State: North Carolina
- Founded: 1842
- Named for: Joseph McDowell
- Seat: Marion
- Largest community: Marion

Area
  - Total: 445.35 sq mi (1,153.5 km^{2})
  - Land: 439.95 sq mi (1,139.5 km^{2})
  - Water: 5.40 sq mi (14.0 km^{2}) 1.21%

Population (2020)
  - Total: 44,578
  - Estimate (2025): 45,198 ▲
  - Density: 101.33/sq mi (39.12/km^{2})
- Time zone: UTC−5 (Eastern)
  - Summer (DST): UTC−4 (EDT)
- Congressional district: 11th
- Website: mcdowellnc.gov

McDowell County is a county located in the U.S. state of North Carolina. As of the 2020 census, the population was 44,578. Its county seat is Marion.

McDowell County comprises the Marion, NC Micropolitan Statistical Area, which is also included in the Charlotte-Concord, NC Combined Statistical Area.

== History ==
Archaeological excavations performed by Dr. David Moore during the early 1980s, revealed artifacts and other evidence that the earliest inhabitants of McDowell County lived there from the Woodland period and Mississippian culture era, from 250 to 1500 AD. Dr. Moore discovered this material in an area close to the Catawba River, in and around an unusual topographical site known as Round Hill. Both the historic Cherokee and Catawba Indians were Native American peoples known to live in what is now McDowell County, and they had been there long before any Europeans. These Native Americans were living in this section for centuries before the Spanish Juan Pardo's 1566 expedition to the interior region from the Atlantic coast.

In the next two years, Pardo traveled from the Spanish colony on an island, through what are now South Carolina and Western North Carolina and into southeastern Tennessee. His expedition traveled through the area that is now McDowell County. His purpose was to acquire territory for Spain and establish forts for an alternative interior route to central Mexico. The Spanish mistakenly believed that the Appalachians connected to a range there, where they had established silver mines.

Pardo also hoped to find precious metals during his expedition, in which he stopped at several Native American villages. Pardo and his men built a log blockhouse, Fort San Juan, at a Mississippian chiefdom known as Joara at the headwaters of the Catawba River, a site north of present-day Morganton, North Carolina. They wintered over at Joara. Pardo directed his forces to establish five more forts in the interior, including one at Chiaha, in present-day southeastern Tennessee. The Native Americans raided the Spanish newcomers and killed all but one of the soldiers in the garrisons, burning all six forts in 1568. Pardo had already left for Spain by then. The Spanish gave up their efforts to settle the interior.

In 1748, "Hunting" John McDowell received a land grant from the colony of North Carolina for property known today as Pleasant Gardens, including acreage that originally extended from Swan's Pond (Catawba County) up the Catawba River west to present-day Marion and into the region known as Buck Creek. McDowell went hunting with his friend Henry Weidner, and the two came upon a lush green valley with thousands of acres of what they thought was virgin forest. They were both interested in the land, and McDowell won a wrestling match to decide who should apply for it.

McDowell settled here with his family, and received two more land grants. established residence here family, and subsequently received two land grants. He is noted in Max Dixon's book, The Wataugans, as being instrumental in Jacob Brown's purchase of one of the last remaining pieces of acreage along the Nolichucky River in eastern Tennessee. McDowell hosted negotiations with the Cherokee from that area on his farm in North Carolina.

His son, Joseph McDowell, fought in the Battle of Kings Mountain. McDowell County is named in his honor. Today, McDowell's home survives, one of the few remaining that was built by its namesake.

The settlement of what was known as Old Fort took place nearby; this became for a time the westernmost outpost of colonial society. These early pioneers established a community protected by a series of forts that were used into the early 19th century.

Historic Carson House

In 1793, Colonel John Carson built a plantation house near Buck Creek in the Pleasant Gardens community. It is known as the historic Carson House. He also operated gold mines in the southern part of the county. Colonel Carson had contributed to the Patriot cause in the American Revolutionary War.

Marion, the county seat of McDowell County, was planned and built on land selected by the first McDowell County Commissioners when they met on March 14, 1844, at the Carson House. It was not until 1845, however, that Marion was designated as the county seat by the state legislature. The settlement was named after Francis Marion, the American Revolutionary War hero known as the "Swamp Fox."

He was the subject of the dramatic movie The Patriot (2000). The historic movie The Last of the Mohicans (1992), based on a novel by James Fenimore Cooper, was set in New York state, but it was filmed along the shores of Lake James.

During the Carolina Gold Rush period of the early 19th century, the south county area was known for its gold production. The banks of the Muddy Creek and mines at Vein Mountain were productive areas. Many mines and thriving gold rush towns such as Brackettown no longer exist; scattered ruins and abandoned cemeteries mark once-active sites of the gold rush period. An old mine in Woodlawn is from this period.

McDowell County was first formed in 1842 from parts of Burke County and Rutherford County. It was named for Joseph McDowell, a Revolutionary War leader and hero of the Battle of King's Mountain. He was elected and served one term as a member of the United States House of Representatives, from 1797 to 1799.

In 1861, parts of McDowell, Burke, Caldwell, Watauga, and Yancey counties were combined to form Mitchell County. McDowell County is rich in American Civil War History.

== Geography ==
Interactive map of McDowell County

According to the U.S. Census Bureau, the county has a total area of 445.35 square miles (1,153.5 km^{2}), of which 439.95 square miles (1,139.5 km^{2}) is land and 5.40 square miles (14.0 km^{2}) (1.21%) is water.

Numerous small creeks and streams flow through the county. The Catawba River originates in and crosses the county and empties into Lake James. It flows over Catawba Falls on its way, which is accessible to the public. Other waterfalls can be found in the county, such as Toms Creek Falls. Almost half of the county, including the two aforementioned waterfalls, is located inside the Pisgah National Forest. Linville Caverns, North Carolina's only limestone cavern system open to the public, is located in the far northern part of the county.

Geologically, McDowell County is located within the southern Appalachian Mountains region. The Blue Ridge Parkway closely follows the northwestern boundary of the county. McDowell County rises rapidly from the Piedmont (United States) in its extreme eastern border where elevations average about 1200 feet above sea level, to the Blue Ridge Mountains in the north and west. Its lowest point is 969 feet above sea level along Cane Creek in the county's southeastern corner. Its highest point is Pinnacle—at 5,665 feet above sea level the second-highest mountain (after Grandfather Mountain) in the Blue Ridge, and also considered the southernmost tip of the Black Mountains, the highest ridge in eastern America. Much of the county lies in the Foothills (North Carolina) region of Western North Carolina.

=== National Protected areas ===
- Blue Ridge Parkway (part)
- Crabtree Falls (part)
- Linville Gorge Wilderness (part)
- Pisgah National Forest (part)

=== State and local protected areas ===
- Bobs Creek State Natural Area
- Davidson's Fort Historic Park
- Fonta Flora State Trail (part)
- Lake James State Park (part)
- Mountain Gateway Museum and Heritage Center
- Pisgah National Forest Game Land (part)
- Pisgah (WRC) Game Land (part)
- South Mountains Game Land (part)
- Wilderness Gateway State Trail (part)

=== Major water bodies ===
- Armstrong Creek
- Bee Rock Creek
- Black Bear Cove
- Broad River
- Buck Creek
- Camp Creek
- Cane Creek
- Catawba River
- Cox Creek
- Crooked Creek
- Jake Creek
- Jarrnett Creek
- Lake James
- Lake Tahoma
- Laurel Creek
- Little Buck Creek
- Mill Creek
- Nix Creek
- North Fork Catawba River
- Rosas Creek
- Second Broad River
- Shoal Creek
- South Muddy Creek
- Toms Creek

=== Adjacent counties ===
- Mitchell County – north
- Avery County – north
- Burke County – east
- Rutherford County – south
- Buncombe County – west
- Yancey County – northwest

=== Major highways ===
- I-40
- US 64
- US 70
- US 221
- US 221 Bus.
- NC 80
- NC 126
- NC 183
- NC 226
- NC 226A

== Demographics ==
Historical population
Census	Pop.	Note	%±
1850	6,246		—
1860	7,120		14.0%
1870	7,592		6.6%
1880	9,836		29.6%
1890	10,939		11.2%
1900	12,567		14.9%
1910	13,538		7.7%
1920	16,763		23.8%
1930	20,336		21.3%
1940	22,996		13.1%
1950	25,720		11.8%
1960	26,742		4.0%
1970	30,648		14.6%
1980	35,135		14.6%
1990	35,681		1.6%
2000	42,151		18.1%
2010	44,996		6.7%
2020	44,578		−0.9%
2025 (est.)	45,198	▲	1.4%
U.S. Decennial Census; 1790–1960 1900–1990; 1990–2000 2010 2020

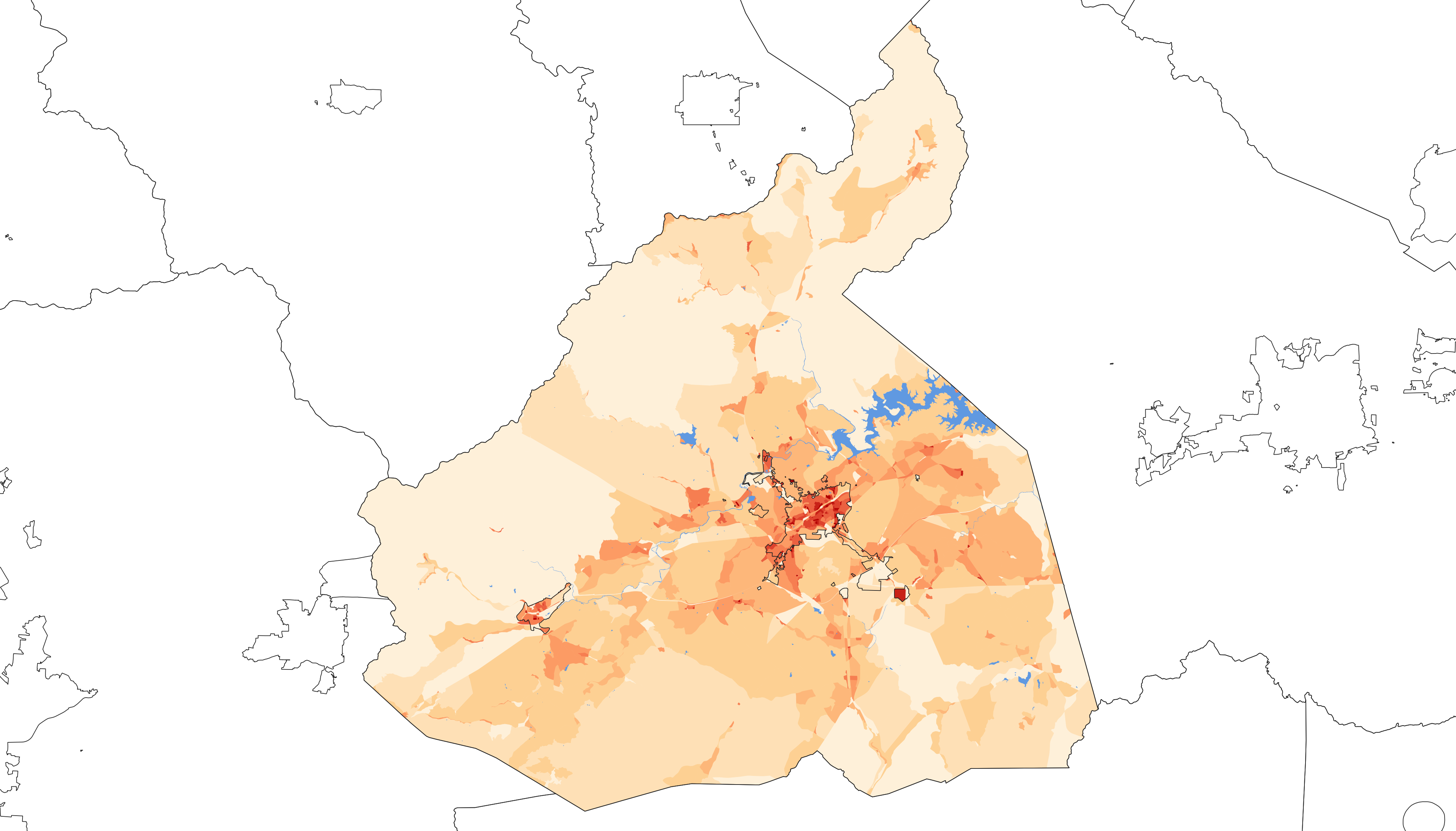
2020 population density of McDowell County NC by census block

=== Racial and ethnic composition ===
McDowell County, North Carolina – Racial and ethnic composition Note: the US Census treats Hispanic/Latino as an ethnic category. This table excludes Latinos from the racial categories and assigns them to a separate category. Hispanics/Latinos may be of any race.
Race / Ethnicity (NH = Non-Hispanic)	Pop 1980	Pop 1990	Pop 2000	Pop 2010	Pop 2020	% 1980	% 1990	% 2000	% 2010	% 2020
White alone (NH)	33,311	33,820	38,373	39,982	37,788	94.81%	94.78%	91.04%	88.86%	84.77%
Black or African American alone (NH)	1,522	1,474	1,716	1,663	1,707	4.33%	4.13%	4.07%	3.70%	3.83%
Native American or Alaska Native alone (NH)	34	72	112	131	136	0.10%	0.20%	0.27%	0.29%	0.31%
Asian alone (NH)	72	196	387	344	388	0.20%	0.55%	0.92%	0.76%	0.87%
Native Hawaiian or Pacific Islander alone (NH)	x	x	5	0	0	x	x	0.01%	0.00%	0.00%
Other race alone (NH)	58	5	38	24	129	0.17%	0.01%	0.09%	0.05%	0.29%
Mixed race or Multiracial (NH)	x	x	306	460	1,483	x	x	0.73%	1.02%	3.33%
Hispanic or Latino (any race)	138	114	1,214	2,392	2,947	0.39%	0.32%	2.88%	5.32%	6.61%
Total	35,135	35,681	42,151	44,996	44,578	100.00%	100.00%	100.00%	100.00%	100.00%

=== 2020 census ===
As of the 2020 census, the county had a population of 44,578. The census also recorded 13,065 families residing in the county.

The median age was 44.8 years. 19.7% of residents were under the age of 18 and 21.0% of residents were 65 years of age or older. For every 100 females there were 103.0 males, and for every 100 females age 18 and over there were 101.2 males age 18 and over.

The racial makeup of the county was 86.0% White, 3.9% Black or African American, 0.5% American Indian and Alaska Native, 0.9% Asian, <0.1% Native Hawaiian and Pacific Islander, 4.0% from some other race, and 4.7% from two or more races. Hispanic or Latino residents of any race comprised 6.6% of the population.

27.0% of residents lived in urban areas, while 73.0% lived in rural areas.

There were 18,058 households in the county, of which 26.8% had children under the age of 18 living in them. Of all households, 48.5% were married-couple households, 18.6% were households with a male householder and no spouse or partner present, and 26.1% were households with a female householder and no spouse or partner present. About 28.4% of all households were made up of individuals and 13.0% had someone living alone who was 65 years of age or older.

There were 21,242 housing units, of which 15.0% were vacant. Among occupied housing units, 73.3% were owner-occupied and 26.7% were renter-occupied. The homeowner vacancy rate was 1.0% and the rental vacancy rate was 6.1%.

=== 2000 census ===
At the 2000 census, there were 42,151 people, 16,604 households, and 11,954 families residing in the county. The population density was 95 people per square mile (37 people/km^{2}). There were 18,377 housing units at an average density of 42 units per square mile (16 units/km^{2}). The racial makeup of the county was 92.18% White, 4.16% Black or African American, 0.29% Native American, 0.92% Asian, 0.01% Pacific Islander, 1.61% from other races, and 0.84% from two or more races. 2.88% of the population were Hispanic or Latino of any race.

There were 16,604 households, out of which 30.30% had children under the age of 18 living with them, 57.50% were married couples living together, 10.20% had a female householder with no husband present, and 28.00% were non-families. 24.30% of all households were made up of individuals, and 10.30% had someone living alone who was 65 years of age or older. The average household size was 2.45 and the average family size was 2.90.

In the county, the population was spread out, with 22.80% under the age of 18, 8.20% from 18 to 24, 29.90% from 25 to 44, 24.90% from 45 to 64, and 14.30% who were 65 years of age or older. The median age was 38 years. For every 100 females there were 99.30 males. For every 100 females age 18 and over, there were 97.70 males.

The median income for a household in the county was $32,396, and the median income for a family was $37,789. Males had a median income of $26,609 versus $21,640 for females. The per capita income for the county was $16,109. About 9.00% of families and 11.60% of the population were below the poverty line, including 15.10% of those under age 18 and 15.70% of those age 65 or over.

== Government and politics ==
McDowell County is a member of the Isothermal Planning and Development Commission regional council of governments.

McDowell County voted Republican in the three elections from 1900 to 1908, but otherwise was solidly Democratic until 1956, when Dwight D. Eisenhower carried the county. Since then, like other areas of the North Carolina Foothills, it has become predominantly Republican. Since 1956, only two Democratic candidates have won the county's vote in presidential elections: Lyndon Johnson in 1964 and Jimmy Carter in 1976, both hailing from the southern region of the nation.

United States presidential election results for McDowell County, North Carolina
Year	Republican		Democratic		Third party(ies)	
Year	No.	%	No.	%	No.	%
1912	343	15.86%	1,037	47.94%	783	36.20%
1916	1,218	48.84%	1,274	51.08%	2	0.08%
1920	2,561	47.69%	2,809	52.31%	0	0.00%
1924	2,590	45.94%	3,023	53.62%	25	0.44%
1928	3,423	49.95%	3,430	50.05%	0	0.00%
1932	2,478	33.84%	4,810	65.68%	35	0.48%
1936	3,114	36.78%	5,352	63.22%	0	0.00%
1940	2,216	29.52%	5,290	70.48%	0	0.00%
1944	2,258	36.04%	4,008	63.96%	0	0.00%
1948	2,709	37.88%	3,805	53.20%	638	8.92%
1952	4,710	49.76%	4,755	50.24%	0	0.00%
1956	5,468	55.46%	4,392	44.54%	0	0.00%
1960	6,148	55.70%	4,889	44.30%	0	0.00%
1964	4,174	39.80%	6,314	60.20%	0	0.00%
1968	4,740	46.01%	2,543	24.69%	3,018	29.30%
1972	6,570	72.09%	2,348	25.76%	196	2.15%
1976	4,450	41.41%	6,246	58.12%	50	0.47%
1980	5,680	53.55%	4,703	44.34%	223	2.10%
1984	7,639	65.09%	4,076	34.73%	21	0.18%
1988	6,526	59.34%	4,449	40.46%	22	0.20%
1992	6,090	45.81%	5,309	39.93%	1,896	14.26%
1996	6,407	52.18%	4,553	37.08%	1,318	10.73%
2000	9,109	65.01%	4,747	33.88%	155	1.11%
2004	10,590	66.18%	5,330	33.31%	82	0.51%
2008	11,534	62.73%	6,571	35.74%	281	1.53%
2012	11,775	65.06%	6,031	33.32%	293	1.62%
2016	14,568	73.30%	4,667	23.48%	640	3.22%
2020	16,883	73.39%	5,832	25.35%	288	1.25%
2024	17,520	74.06%	5,911	24.99%	224	0.95%

=== 2016 presidential primaries and election ===
In the 2016 Republican Primary in McDowell County, Donald Trump received 2,552 votes (or 41.2% of the total votes) followed by Ted Cruz, who came in second with 2,422 votes (or 39.1% of the total votes). In the 2016 Democratic Primary, Bernie Sanders received 1,622 votes (49.0%) and Hillary Clinton received 1,353 votes (40.9%).

In the 2016 presidential election in McDowell County, Republican Donald Trump received 14,517 votes (74.2%), Democrat Hillary Clinton 4,645 votes (23.8%), and Libertarian Gary Johnson 395 votes (2.0%).

== Education ==
View of McDowell High School from the football stadium

The following is a list of schools located in McDowell County:

- Marion Elementary School
- West Marion Elementary School
- Nebo Elementary School
- Old Fort Elementary School
- Pleasant Gardens Elementary School
- Eastfield Global Magnet School
- Glenwood Elementary School
- North Cove Elementary School
- West McDowell Middle School
- East McDowell Middle School
- Foothills Community School
- McDowell High School
- McDowell Early College High School
- McDowell Academy for Innovation
- Phoenix Academy
- New Manna Christian School
- Nebo Crossing Christian Academy

McDowell County has one community college: McDowell Technical Community College

== Communities ==
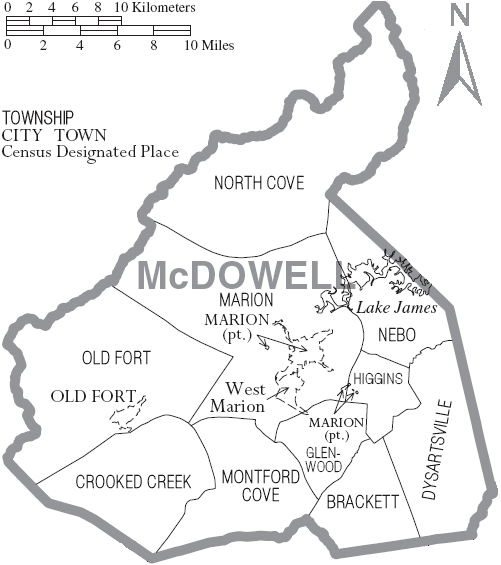
Map of McDowell County with municipal and township labels

=== City ===
- Marion (county seat and largest community)

=== Town ===
- Old Fort

=== Townships ===
- Crooked Creek
- Dysartsville
- Glenwood
- Marion
- Montford Cove
- Nebo
- North Cove
- Old Fort
- Pleasant Gardens
- Sugar Hill
- Woodlawn-Sevier

=== Census-designated place ===
- Glenwood
- Nebo
- West Marion

=== Unincorporated communities ===
- Linville Falls (also in Avery and Burke)
- Little Switzerland (also in Mitchell County)
- North Cove

== See also ==
- List of counties in North Carolina
- National Register of Historic Places listings in McDowell County, North Carolina
