= Political party strength in Tennessee =

Politics in the US state of Tennessee

Tennessee's politics are currently dominated by the Republican Party. Republicans currently hold both of the state's U.S. Senate seats, a majority of Congressional seats, and the state legislature. Democratic strength is largely concentrated in Nashville, Memphis, Chattanooga and parts of Knoxville, Clarksville, Murfreesboro and Jackson. Several rural Black Belt areas of West Tennessee and suburban areas of the Nashville/Murfreesboro, Chattanooga and Knoxville metropolitan areas also contain significant Democratic minorities. On the other hand, Republicans have a solid base of support in Cookeville and its suburbs, most exurban areas around Nashville except in Rutherford County and Franklin, most suburbs of Memphis, the Tri-Cities outside of Johnson City itself and most majority rural areas, regularly outperforming even their statewide results there.

== Table ==
The following table indicates the party of elected officials in the U.S. state of Tennessee:

- Governor

The table also indicates the historical party composition in the:

- State Senate
- State House of Representatives
- State delegation to the U.S. Senate
- State delegation to the U.S. House of Representatives

For years in which a presidential election was held, the table indicates which party's nominees received the state's electoral votes.

Year	Executive office	State Legislature		United States Congress			Electoral College votes
Year	Governor	State Senate	State House	U.S. Senator (Class I)	U.S. Senator (Class II)	U.S. House	Electoral College votes
1790	William Blount (DR) (Note: Governor of Southwest Territory.)	[?]	[?]			James White (DR) (Note: Delegate from Southwest Territory.)	
1791	William Blount (DR)	[?]	[?]			James White (DR)	
1792	William Blount (DR)	[?]	[?]			James White (DR)	
1793	William Blount (DR)	[?]	[?]			James White (DR)	
1794	William Blount (DR)	DR majority	[?]			James White (DR)	
1795	William Blount (DR)	DR majority	[?]			James White (DR)	
1796	John Sevier (DR)	[?]	[?]	William Cocke (DR)	William Blount (DR) (Note: Expelled from the United States Senate for conspiring with the British to seize West Florida from Spain.)	Andrew Jackson (DR)	Thomas Jefferson/ Aaron Burr (DR) ✗
1797	John Sevier (DR)	[?]	[?]	William Cocke (DR)	William Blount (DR)	Andrew Jackson (DR)	Thomas Jefferson/ Aaron Burr (DR) ✗
1797	John Sevier (DR)	[?]	[?]	Andrew Jackson (DR) (Note: Resigned.)	Joseph Anderson (DR)	William C. C. Claiborne (DR)	Thomas Jefferson/ Aaron Burr (DR) ✗
1798	John Sevier (DR)	DR majority	[?]	Andrew Jackson (DR)	Joseph Anderson (DR)	William C. C. Claiborne (DR)	Thomas Jefferson/ Aaron Burr (DR) ✗
1798	John Sevier (DR)	DR majority	[?]	Daniel Smith (DR)	Joseph Anderson (DR)	William C. C. Claiborne (DR)	Thomas Jefferson/ Aaron Burr (DR) ✗
1799	John Sevier (DR)	[?]	DR majority	Joseph Anderson (DR)	William Cocke (DR)	William C. C. Claiborne (DR)	Thomas Jefferson/ Aaron Burr (DR) ✗
1800	John Sevier (DR)	[?]	DR majority	Joseph Anderson (DR)	William Cocke (DR)	William C. C. Claiborne (DR)	Thomas Jefferson/ Aaron Burr (DR) ✓
1801	Archibald Roane (DR)	[?]	DR majority	Joseph Anderson (DR)	William Cocke (DR)	William Dickson (DR)	Thomas Jefferson/ Aaron Burr (DR) ✓
1802	Archibald Roane (DR)	[?]	DR majority	Joseph Anderson (DR)	William Cocke (DR)	William Dickson (DR)	Thomas Jefferson/ Aaron Burr (DR) ✓
1803	John Sevier (DR)	[?]	[?]	Joseph Anderson (DR)	William Cocke (DR)	3DR	Thomas Jefferson/ Aaron Burr (DR) ✓
1804	John Sevier (DR)	[?]	[?]	Joseph Anderson (DR)	William Cocke (DR)	3DR	Thomas Jefferson/ George Clinton (DR) ✓
1805	John Sevier (DR)	DR majority	DR majority	Joseph Anderson (DR)	Daniel Smith (DR)	3DR	Thomas Jefferson/ George Clinton (DR) ✓
1806	John Sevier (DR)	DR majority	DR majority	Joseph Anderson (DR)	Daniel Smith (DR)	3DR	Thomas Jefferson/ George Clinton (DR) ✓
1807	John Sevier (DR)	DR majority	[?]	Joseph Anderson (DR)	Daniel Smith (DR)	3DR	Thomas Jefferson/ George Clinton (DR) ✓
1808	John Sevier (DR)	DR majority	[?]	Joseph Anderson (DR)	Daniel Smith (DR)	3DR	James Madison/ George Clinton (DR) ✓
1809	Willie Blount (DR)	DR majority	F majority	Joseph Anderson (DR)	Daniel Smith (DR)	3DR	James Madison/ George Clinton (DR) ✓
1809	Willie Blount (DR)	DR majority	F majority	Joseph Anderson (DR)	Jenkin Whiteside (DR)	3DR	James Madison/ George Clinton (DR) ✓
1810	Willie Blount (DR)	DR majority	F majority	Joseph Anderson (DR)	Jenkin Whiteside (DR)	3DR	James Madison/ George Clinton (DR) ✓
1811	Willie Blount (DR)	DR majority	DR majority	Joseph Anderson (DR)	Jenkin Whiteside (DR)	3DR	James Madison/ George Clinton (DR) ✓
1811	Willie Blount (DR)	DR majority	DR majority	Joseph Anderson (DR)	George W. Campbell (DR) (Note: Resigned to take office as United States Secretary of the Treasury.)	3DR	James Madison/ George Clinton (DR) ✓
1812	Willie Blount (DR)	DR majority	DR majority	Joseph Anderson (DR)	George W. Campbell (DR)	3DR	James Madison/ Elbridge Gerry (DR) ✓
1813	Willie Blount (DR)	DR majority	DR majority	Joseph Anderson (DR)	George W. Campbell (DR)	6DR	James Madison/ Elbridge Gerry (DR) ✓
1814	Willie Blount (DR)	DR majority	DR majority	Joseph Anderson (DR)	Jesse Wharton (DR)	6DR	James Madison/ Elbridge Gerry (DR) ✓
1815	Joseph McMinn (DR)	DR majority	DR majority	George W. Campbell (DR)	Jesse Wharton (DR)	6DR	James Madison/ Elbridge Gerry (DR) ✓
1815	Joseph McMinn (DR)	DR majority	DR majority	George W. Campbell (DR)	John Williams (DR)	6DR	James Madison/ Elbridge Gerry (DR) ✓
1816	Joseph McMinn (DR)	DR majority	DR majority	George W. Campbell (DR)	John Williams (DR)	6DR	James Monroe/ Daniel D. Tompkins (DR) ✓
1817	Joseph McMinn (DR)	DR majority	DR majority	George W. Campbell (DR)	John Williams (DR)	6DR	James Monroe/ Daniel D. Tompkins (DR) ✓
1818	Joseph McMinn (DR)	DR majority	DR majority	George W. Campbell (DR)	John Williams (DR)	6DR	James Monroe/ Daniel D. Tompkins (DR) ✓
1818	Joseph McMinn (DR)	DR majority	DR majority	John Eaton (DR)	John Williams (DR)	6DR	James Monroe/ Daniel D. Tompkins (DR) ✓
1819	Joseph McMinn (DR)	DR majority	DR majority	John Eaton (DR)	John Williams (DR)	6DR	James Monroe/ Daniel D. Tompkins (DR) ✓
1820	Joseph McMinn (DR)	DR majority	DR majority	John Eaton (DR)	John Williams (DR)	6DR	James Monroe/ Daniel D. Tompkins (DR) ✓
1821	William Carroll (DR)	DR majority	DR majority	John Eaton (DR)	John Williams (DR)	5DR, 1 vac.	James Monroe/ Daniel D. Tompkins (DR) ✓
1822	William Carroll (DR)	DR majority	DR majority	John Eaton (DR)	John Williams (DR)	5DR, 1 vac.	James Monroe/ Daniel D. Tompkins (DR) ✓
1823	William Carroll (DR)	DR majority	DR majority	John Eaton (DR)	Andrew Jackson (DR)	9DR	James Monroe/ Daniel D. Tompkins (DR) ✓
1824	William Carroll (DR)	DR majority	DR majority	John Eaton (DR)	Andrew Jackson (DR)	9DR	Andrew Jackson ✗ / John C. Calhoun ✓ (DR)
1825	William Carroll (DR)	NR majority	[?]	John Eaton (J) (Note: Resigned to take office as United States Secretary of War.)	Andrew Jackson (J)	9J	Andrew Jackson ✗ / John C. Calhoun ✓ (DR)
1825	William Carroll (DR)	NR majority	[?]	John Eaton (J)	Hugh Lawson White (J)	9J	Andrew Jackson ✗ / John C. Calhoun ✓ (DR)
1826	William Carroll (DR)	NR majority	[?]	John Eaton (J)	Hugh Lawson White (J)	9J	Andrew Jackson ✗ / John C. Calhoun ✓ (DR)
1827	Sam Houston (DR)	J majority	[?]	John Eaton (J)	Hugh Lawson White (J)	8J, 1NR	Andrew Jackson ✗ / John C. Calhoun ✓ (DR)
1828	Sam Houston (DR)	J majority	[?]	John Eaton (J)	Hugh Lawson White (J)	8J, 1NR	Andrew Jackson/ John C. Calhoun (D) ✓
1829	Sam Houston (DR)	J majority	NR majority	John Eaton (J)	Hugh Lawson White (J)	8J, 1NR	Andrew Jackson/ John C. Calhoun (D) ✓
1829	William Hall (D)	NR majority	NR majority	Felix Grundy (J) (Note: Resigned to take office as United States Attorney General.)	Hugh Lawson White (J)	8J, 1NR	Andrew Jackson/ John C. Calhoun (D) ✓
1829	William Carroll (D)	NR majority	NR majority	Felix Grundy (J)	Hugh Lawson White (J)	8J, 1NR	Andrew Jackson/ John C. Calhoun (D) ✓
1830	William Carroll (D)	NR majority	NR majority	Felix Grundy (J)	Hugh Lawson White (J)	8J, 1NR	Andrew Jackson/ John C. Calhoun (D) ✓
1831	William Carroll (D)	NR majority	J majority	Felix Grundy (J)	Hugh Lawson White (J)	8J, 1NR	Andrew Jackson/ John C. Calhoun (D) ✓
1832	William Carroll (D)	NR majority	J majority	Felix Grundy (J)	Hugh Lawson White (J)	8J, 1NR	Andrew Jackson/ Martin Van Buren (D) ✓
1833	William Carroll (D)	J majority	J majority	Felix Grundy (J)	Hugh Lawson White (J)	12J, 1NR	Andrew Jackson/ Martin Van Buren (D) ✓
1834	William Carroll (D)	J majority	J majority	Felix Grundy (J)	Hugh Lawson White (J)	12J, 1NR	Andrew Jackson/ Martin Van Buren (D) ✓
1835	Newton Cannon (W)	NR majority	J majority	Felix Grundy (J)	Hugh Lawson White (NR)	9NR, 4J	Andrew Jackson/ Martin Van Buren (D) ✓
1836	Newton Cannon (W)	NR majority	NR majority	Felix Grundy (J)	Hugh Lawson White (NR)	9NR, 4J	Hugh Lawson White/ John Tyler (W) ✗
1837	Newton Cannon (W)	NR majority	NR majority	Felix Grundy (D)	Hugh Lawson White (W)	10W, 3D	Hugh Lawson White/ John Tyler (W) ✗
1838	Newton Cannon (W)	18W, 7D	46W, 25D, 4?	vacant	Hugh Lawson White (W)	10W, 3D	Hugh Lawson White/ John Tyler (W) ✗
1838	Newton Cannon (W)	18W, 7D	46W, 25D, 4?	Ephraim H. Foster (W)	Hugh Lawson White (W)	10W, 3D	Hugh Lawson White/ John Tyler (W) ✗
1839	James K. Polk (D)	18W, 7D	46W, 25D, 4?	Felix Grundy (D) (Note: Died in office.)	Hugh Lawson White (W)	7W, 6D	Hugh Lawson White/ John Tyler (W) ✗
1840	James K. Polk (D)	14D, 11W	42D, 33W	Felix Grundy (D)	Alexander O. Anderson (D)	7W, 6D	William Henry Harrison/ John Tyler (W) ✓
1841	James C. Jones (W)	14D, 11W	42D, 33W	Alfred O. P. Nicholson (D)	vacant	8W, 5D	William Henry Harrison/ John Tyler (W) ✓
1842	James C. Jones (W)	13D, 12W	39W, 36D	Alfred O. P. Nicholson (D)	vacant	8W, 5D	William Henry Harrison/ John Tyler (W) ✓
1843	James C. Jones (W)	13D, 12W	39W, 36D	Ephraim H. Foster (W)	Spencer Jarnagin (W)	6D, 5W	William Henry Harrison/ John Tyler (W) ✓
1844	James C. Jones (W)	14W, 11D	40W, 35D	Ephraim H. Foster (W)	Spencer Jarnagin (W)	6D, 5W	Henry Clay/ Theodore Frelinghuysen (W) ✗
1845	Aaron V. Brown (D)	14W, 11D	40W, 35D	Hopkins L. Turney (D)	Spencer Jarnagin (W)	6D, 5W	Henry Clay/ Theodore Frelinghuysen (W) ✗
1846	Aaron V. Brown (D)	13D, 12W	39D, 36W	Hopkins L. Turney (D)	Spencer Jarnagin (W)	6D, 5W	Henry Clay/ Theodore Frelinghuysen (W) ✗
1847	Neill S. Brown (W)	13D, 12W	39D, 36W	Hopkins L. Turney (D)	John Bell (W)	6D, 5W	Henry Clay/ Theodore Frelinghuysen (W) ✗
1848	Neill S. Brown (W)	13W, 12D	41W, 34D	Hopkins L. Turney (D)	John Bell (W)	6D, 5W	Zachary Taylor/ Millard Fillmore (W) ✓
1849	William Trousdale (D)	13W, 12D	41W, 34D	Hopkins L. Turney (D)	John Bell (W)	7D, 4W	Zachary Taylor/ Millard Fillmore (W) ✓
1850	William Trousdale (D)	14D, 11W	39D, 36W	Hopkins L. Turney (D)	John Bell (W)	7D, 4W	Zachary Taylor/ Millard Fillmore (W) ✓
1851	William B. Campbell (W)	14D, 11W	39D, 36W	James C. Jones (W)	John Bell (W)	7D, 4W	Zachary Taylor/ Millard Fillmore (W) ✓
1852	William B. Campbell (W)	16W, 9D	39W, 36D	James C. Jones (W)	John Bell (W)	7D, 4W	Winfield Scott/ William Alexander Graham (W) ✗
1853	Andrew Johnson (D)	16W, 9D	39W, 36D	James C. Jones (W)	John Bell (W)	5D, 5W	Winfield Scott/ William Alexander Graham (W) ✗
1854	Andrew Johnson (D)	13D, 12KN	44W, 31D	James C. Jones (W)	John Bell (W)	6W, 4D	Winfield Scott/ William Alexander Graham (W) ✗
1855	Andrew Johnson (D)	13D, 12KN	44W, 31D	James C. Jones (W)	John Bell (W)	5D, 5KN	Winfield Scott/ William Alexander Graham (W) ✗
1856	Andrew Johnson (D)	14KN, 11D	38KN, 37D	James C. Jones (W)	John Bell (W)	5D, 5KN	James Buchanan/ John C. Breckinridge (D) ✓
1857	Isham G. Harris (D)	14KN, 11D	38KN, 37D	Andrew Johnson (D)	John Bell (KN)	7D, 3KN	James Buchanan/ John C. Breckinridge (D) ✓
1858	Isham G. Harris (D)	18D, 7KN	42D, 33KN	Andrew Johnson (D)	John Bell (KN)	7D, 3KN	James Buchanan/ John C. Breckinridge (D) ✓
1859	Isham G. Harris (D)	18D, 7KN	42D, 33KN	Andrew Johnson (D)	Alfred O. P. Nicholson (D)	7O, 3D	James Buchanan/ John C. Breckinridge (D) ✓
1860	Isham G. Harris (D)	14D, 11O	41D, 34O	Andrew Johnson (D)	Alfred O. P. Nicholson (D)	7O, 3D	John Bell/ Edward Everett (CU) ✗
1861	Isham G. Harris (D)	14D, 11O	41D, 34O	Andrew Johnson (D)	Alfred O. P. Nicholson (D)	3U, 7 vac.	John Bell/ Edward Everett (CU) ✗
1862	Isham G. Harris (D)	American Civil War		Andrew Johnson (D)			John Bell/ Edward Everett (CU) ✗
1862	Andrew Johnson (U/Military)	American Civil War				American Civil War	John Bell/ Edward Everett (CU) ✗
1863	Andrew Johnson (U/Military)	American Civil War				American Civil War	John Bell/ Edward Everett (CU) ✗
1864	Andrew Johnson (U/Military)	American Civil War				American Civil War	Abraham Lincoln/ Andrew Johnson (NU) ✓
1865	Edward H. East (R) (Note: Served as secretary of state of Tennessee from 1862 until 1865, having been appointed by Andrew Johnson, the military governor of the state under Union occupation during the American Civil War. After Johnson was inaugurated as vice president of the United States on March 4, 1865, East became "Acting Governor of Tennessee" until Parson Brownlow, the elected governor of Tennessee, was inaugurated on April 5, 1865. The official Tennessee Blue Book does not include East in its list of former Governors.)	American Civil War				American Civil War	Abraham Lincoln/ Andrew Johnson (NU) ✓
1865	Parson Brownlow (R)	American Civil War					Abraham Lincoln/ Andrew Johnson (NU) ✓
1866	Parson Brownlow (R)	25R	79R, 4D	David T. Patterson (U)	Joseph S. Fowler (U)	8U	Abraham Lincoln/ Andrew Johnson (NU) ✓
1867	Parson Brownlow (R)	25R	79R, 4D	David T. Patterson (D)	Joseph S. Fowler (R)	8R	Abraham Lincoln/ Andrew Johnson (NU) ✓
1868	Parson Brownlow (R)	25R	83R	David T. Patterson (D)	Joseph S. Fowler (R)	8R	Ulysses S. Grant/ Schuyler Colfax (R) ✓
1869	Dewitt Clinton Senter (R)	25R	83R	Parson Brownlow (R)	Joseph S. Fowler (R)	8R	Ulysses S. Grant/ Schuyler Colfax (R) ✓
1870	Dewitt Clinton Senter (R)	20D, 5R	66D, 17R	Parson Brownlow (R)	Joseph S. Fowler (R)	8R	Ulysses S. Grant/ Schuyler Colfax (R) ✓
1871	John C. Brown (D)	22D, 3R	63D, 12R	Parson Brownlow (R)	Henry Cooper (D)	6D, 2R	Ulysses S. Grant/ Schuyler Colfax (R) ✓
1872	John C. Brown (D)	22D, 3R	63D, 12R	Parson Brownlow (R)	Henry Cooper (D)	6D, 2R	Thomas A. Hendricks/ B. Gratz Brown (D) ✗
1873	John C. Brown (D)	18D, 7R	49D, 26R	Parson Brownlow (R)	Henry Cooper (D)	7R, 3D	Thomas A. Hendricks/ B. Gratz Brown (D) ✗
1874	John C. Brown (D)	18D, 7R	49D, 26R	Parson Brownlow (R)	Henry Cooper (D)	7R, 3D	Thomas A. Hendricks/ B. Gratz Brown (D) ✗
1875	James D. Porter (D)	23D, 2R	70D, 5R	Andrew Johnson (D)	Henry Cooper (D)	9D, 1R	Thomas A. Hendricks/ B. Gratz Brown (D) ✗
1875	James D. Porter (D)	23D, 2R	70D, 5R	David M. Key (D)	Henry Cooper (D)	9D, 1R	Thomas A. Hendricks/ B. Gratz Brown (D) ✗
1876	James D. Porter (D)	23D, 2R	70D, 5R	David M. Key (D)	Henry Cooper (D)	9D, 1R	Samuel J. Tilden/ Thomas A. Hendricks (D) ✗
1877	James D. Porter (D)	20D, 5R	59D, 16R	James E. Bailey (D)	Isham G. Harris (D)	8D, 2R	Samuel J. Tilden/ Thomas A. Hendricks (D) ✗
1878	James D. Porter (D)	20D, 5R	59D, 16R	James E. Bailey (D)	Isham G. Harris (D)	8D, 2R	Samuel J. Tilden/ Thomas A. Hendricks (D) ✗
1879	Albert S. Marks (D)	22D, 3R	61D, 14R	James E. Bailey (D)	Isham G. Harris (D)	9D, 1R	Samuel J. Tilden/ Thomas A. Hendricks (D) ✗
1880	Albert S. Marks (D)	22D, 3R	61D, 14R	James E. Bailey (D)	Isham G. Harris (D)	9D, 1R	Winfield Scott Hancock and William Hayden English (D) ✗
1881	Alvin Hawkins (R)	15D, 10R	37R, 37D, 1GB (Note: The Greenback member supported the Republicans in the vote for Speaker, giving them control of the chamber.)	Howell E. Jackson (D) (Note: Resigned to take seat on the United States Circuit Court for the Sixth Circuit.)	Isham G. Harris (D)	7D, 3R	Winfield Scott Hancock and William Hayden English (D) ✗
1882	Alvin Hawkins (R)	15D, 10R	37R, 37D, 1GB	Howell E. Jackson (D)	Isham G. Harris (D)	7D, 3R	Winfield Scott Hancock and William Hayden English (D) ✗
1883	William B. Bate (D)	27D, 6R	71D, 28R	Howell E. Jackson (D)	Isham G. Harris (D)	8D, 2R	Winfield Scott Hancock and William Hayden English (D) ✗
1884	William B. Bate (D)	27D, 6R	71D, 28R	Howell E. Jackson (D)	Isham G. Harris (D)	8D, 2R	Grover Cleveland/ Thomas A. Hendricks (D) ✓
1885	William B. Bate (D)	22D, 11R	81D, 18R	Howell E. Jackson (D)	Isham G. Harris (D)	7D, 3R	Grover Cleveland/ Thomas A. Hendricks (D) ✓
1886	William B. Bate (D)	22D, 11R	81D, 18R	Howell E. Jackson (D)	Isham G. Harris (D)	7D, 3R	Grover Cleveland/ Thomas A. Hendricks (D) ✓
1886	William B. Bate (D)	22D, 11R	81D, 18R	Washington C. Whitthorne (D)	Isham G. Harris (D)	7D, 3R	Grover Cleveland/ Thomas A. Hendricks (D) ✓
1887	Robert Love Taylor (D)	21D, 12R	63D, 36R	William B. Bate (D)	Isham G. Harris (D)	8D, 2R	Grover Cleveland/ Thomas A. Hendricks (D) ✓
1888	Robert Love Taylor (D)	21D, 12R	63D, 36R	William B. Bate (D)	Isham G. Harris (D)	8D, 2R	Grover Cleveland/ Allen G. Thurman (D) ✗
1889	Robert Love Taylor (D)	23D, 10R	69D, 30R	William B. Bate (D)	Isham G. Harris (D)	7D, 3R	Grover Cleveland/ Allen G. Thurman (D) ✗
1890	Robert Love Taylor (D)	23D, 10R	69D, 30R	William B. Bate (D)	Isham G. Harris (D)	7D, 3R	Grover Cleveland/ Allen G. Thurman (D) ✗
1891	John P. Buchanan (FA)	25D, 8R	79D, 20R	William B. Bate (D)	Isham G. Harris (D)	8D, 2R	Grover Cleveland/ Allen G. Thurman (D) ✗
1892	John P. Buchanan (FA)	25D, 8R	79D, 20R	William B. Bate (D)	Isham G. Harris (D)	8D, 2R	Grover Cleveland/ Adlai Stevenson I (D) ✓
1893	Peter Turney (D)	25D, 6R, 1Pop, 1I	68D, 26R, 5Pop	William B. Bate (D)	Isham G. Harris (D)	8D, 2R	Grover Cleveland/ Adlai Stevenson I (D) ✓
1894	Peter Turney (D)	25D, 6R, 1Pop, 1I	68D, 26R, 5Pop	William B. Bate (D)	Isham G. Harris (D)	8D, 2R	Grover Cleveland/ Adlai Stevenson I (D) ✓
1895	Peter Turney (D)	21D, 10R, 1Pop, 1U	60D, 32R, 7Pop	William B. Bate (D)	Isham G. Harris (D)	6D, 4R	Grover Cleveland/ Adlai Stevenson I (D) ✓
1896	Peter Turney (D)	21D, 10R, 1Pop, 1U	60D, 32R, 7Pop	William B. Bate (D)	Isham G. Harris (D)	6D, 4R	William Jennings Bryan/ Arthur Sewall (D) ✗
1897	Robert Love Taylor (D)	24D, 9R	63D, 32R, 4Pop	William B. Bate (D)	Isham G. Harris (D)	8D, 2R	William Jennings Bryan/ Arthur Sewall (D) ✗
1897	Robert Love Taylor (D)	24D, 9R	63D, 32R, 4Pop	William B. Bate (D)	Thomas B. Turley (D)	8D, 2R	William Jennings Bryan/ Arthur Sewall (D) ✗
1898	Robert Love Taylor (D)	24D, 9R	63D, 32R, 4Pop	William B. Bate (D)	Thomas B. Turley (D)	8D, 2R	William Jennings Bryan/ Arthur Sewall (D) ✗
1899	Benton McMillin (D)	25D, 8R	77D, 22R	William B. Bate (D)	Thomas B. Turley (D)	8D, 2R	William Jennings Bryan/ Arthur Sewall (D) ✗
1900	Benton McMillin (D)	25D, 8R	77D, 22R	William B. Bate (D)	Thomas B. Turley (D)	8D, 2R	William Jennings Bryan/ Adlai Stevenson I (D) ✗
1901	Benton McMillin (D)	27D, 5R, 1ID	76D, 23R	William B. Bate (D)	Edward W. Carmack (D)	8D, 2R	William Jennings Bryan/ Adlai Stevenson I (D) ✗
1902	Benton McMillin (D)	27D, 5R, 1ID	76D, 23R	William B. Bate (D)	Edward W. Carmack (D)	8D, 2R	William Jennings Bryan/ Adlai Stevenson I (D) ✗
1903	James B. Frazier (D) (Note: Resigned to take seat in the United States Senate.)	28D, 5R	83D, 16R	William B. Bate (D)	Edward W. Carmack (D)	8D, 2R	William Jennings Bryan/ Adlai Stevenson I (D) ✗
1904	James B. Frazier (D)	28D, 5R	83D, 16R	William B. Bate (D)	Edward W. Carmack (D)	8D, 2R	Alton B. Parker/ Henry G. Davis (D) ✗
1905	James B. Frazier (D)	28D, 5R	80D, 19R	William B. Bate (D)	Edward W. Carmack (D)	8D, 2R	Alton B. Parker/ Henry G. Davis (D) ✗
1905	John I. Cox (D)	28D, 5R	80D, 19R	James B. Frazier (D)	Edward W. Carmack (D)	8D, 2R	Alton B. Parker/ Henry G. Davis (D) ✗
1906	John I. Cox (D)	28D, 5R	80D, 19R	James B. Frazier (D)	Edward W. Carmack (D)	8D, 2R	Alton B. Parker/ Henry G. Davis (D) ✗
1907	Malcolm R. Patterson (D)	27D, 6R	78D, 21R	James B. Frazier (D)	Robert Love Taylor (D)	8D, 2R	Alton B. Parker/ Henry G. Davis (D) ✗
1908	Malcolm R. Patterson (D)	27D, 6R	78D, 21R	James B. Frazier (D)	Robert Love Taylor (D)	8D, 2R	William Jennings Bryan/ John W. Kern (D) ✗
1909	Malcolm R. Patterson (D)	28D, 5R	77D, 22R	James B. Frazier (D)	Robert Love Taylor (D)	8D, 2R	William Jennings Bryan/ John W. Kern (D) ✗
1910	Malcolm R. Patterson (D)	28D, 5R	77D, 22R	James B. Frazier (D)	Robert Love Taylor (D)	8D, 2R	William Jennings Bryan/ John W. Kern (D) ✗
1911	Ben W. Hooper (R)	21D, 7R, 4RD, 1I	74D, 25R	Luke Lea (D)	Robert Love Taylor (D)	8D, 2R	William Jennings Bryan/ John W. Kern (D) ✗
1912	Ben W. Hooper (R)	21D, 7R, 4RD, 1I	74D, 25R	Luke Lea (D)	Newell Sanders (R)	8D, 2R	Woodrow Wilson/ Thomas R. Marshall (D) ✓
1913	Ben W. Hooper (R)	16D, 6R, 6RD, 5ID	52D, 27R, 20I	Luke Lea (D)	William R. Webb (D)	8D, 2R	Woodrow Wilson/ Thomas R. Marshall (D) ✓
1913	Ben W. Hooper (R)	16D, 6R, 6RD, 5ID	52D, 27R, 20I	Luke Lea (D)	John K. Shields (D)	8D, 2R	Woodrow Wilson/ Thomas R. Marshall (D) ✓
1914	Ben W. Hooper (R)	16D, 6R, 6RD, 5ID	52D, 27R, 20I	Luke Lea (D)	John K. Shields (D)	8D, 2R	Woodrow Wilson/ Thomas R. Marshall (D) ✓
1915	Thomas Clark Rye (D)	26D, 7R	72D, 27R	Luke Lea (D)	John K. Shields (D)	8D, 2R	Woodrow Wilson/ Thomas R. Marshall (D) ✓
1916	Thomas Clark Rye (D)	26D, 7R	72D, 27R	Luke Lea (D)	John K. Shields (D)	8D, 2R	Woodrow Wilson/ Thomas R. Marshall (D) ✓
1917	Thomas Clark Rye (D)	27D, 6R	72D, 27R	Kenneth McKellar (D)	John K. Shields (D)	8D, 2R	Woodrow Wilson/ Thomas R. Marshall (D) ✓
1918	Thomas Clark Rye (D)	27D, 6R	72D, 27R	Kenneth McKellar (D)	John K. Shields (D)	8D, 2R	Woodrow Wilson/ Thomas R. Marshall (D) ✓
1919	Albert H. Roberts (D)	26D, 7R	72D, 27R	Kenneth McKellar (D)	John K. Shields (D)	8D, 2R	Woodrow Wilson/ Thomas R. Marshall (D) ✓
1920	Albert H. Roberts (D)	26D, 7R	72D, 27R	Kenneth McKellar (D)	John K. Shields (D)	8D, 2R	Warren G. Harding/ Calvin Coolidge (R) ✓
1921	Alfred A. Taylor (R)	24D, 9R	66D, 32R, 1I	Kenneth McKellar (D)	John K. Shields (D)	5D, 5R	Warren G. Harding/ Calvin Coolidge (R) ✓
1922	Alfred A. Taylor (R)	24D, 9R	66D, 32R, 1I	Kenneth McKellar (D)	John K. Shields (D)	5D, 5R	Warren G. Harding/ Calvin Coolidge (R) ✓
1923	Austin Peay (D)	28D, 5R	76D, 23R	Kenneth McKellar (D)	John K. Shields (D)	8D, 2R	Warren G. Harding/ Calvin Coolidge (R) ✓
1924	Austin Peay (D)	28D, 5R	76D, 23R	Kenneth McKellar (D)	John K. Shields (D)	8D, 2R	John W. Davis/ Charles W. Bryan (D) ✗
1925	Austin Peay (D)	29D, 4R	76D, 23R	Kenneth McKellar (D)	Lawrence Tyson (D)	8D, 2R	John W. Davis/ Charles W. Bryan (D) ✗
1926	Austin Peay (D)	29D, 4R	76D, 23R	Kenneth McKellar (D)	Lawrence Tyson (D)	8D, 2R	John W. Davis/ Charles W. Bryan (D) ✗
1927	Henry Hollis Horton (D) (Note: Assumed office upon the death of his predecessor.)	28D, 5R	80D, 19R	Kenneth McKellar (D)	Lawrence Tyson (D)	8D, 2R	John W. Davis/ Charles W. Bryan (D) ✗
1928	Henry Hollis Horton (D)	28D, 5R	80D, 19R	Kenneth McKellar (D)	Lawrence Tyson (D)	8D, 2R	Herbert Hoover/ Charles Curtis (R) ✓
1929	Henry Hollis Horton (D)	25D, 8R	72D, 27R	Kenneth McKellar (D)	Lawrence Tyson (D)	8D, 2R	Herbert Hoover/ Charles Curtis (R) ✓
1929	Henry Hollis Horton (D)	25D, 8R	72D, 27R	Kenneth McKellar (D)	William E. Brock (D)	8D, 2R	Herbert Hoover/ Charles Curtis (R) ✓
1930	Henry Hollis Horton (D)	25D, 8R	72D, 27R	Kenneth McKellar (D)	William E. Brock (D)	8D, 2R	Herbert Hoover/ Charles Curtis (R) ✓
1931	Henry Hollis Horton (D)	28D, 5R	83D, 16R	Kenneth McKellar (D)	Cordell Hull (D) (Note: Resigned to take office as United States Secretary of State.)	8D, 2R	Herbert Hoover/ Charles Curtis (R) ✓
1932	Henry Hollis Horton (D)	28D, 5R	83D, 16R	Kenneth McKellar (D)	Cordell Hull (D)	8D, 2R	Franklin D. Roosevelt/ John Nance Garner (D) ✓
1933	Hill McAlister (D)	29D, 4R	81D, 18R	Kenneth McKellar (D)	Nathan L. Bachman (D)	7D, 2R	Franklin D. Roosevelt/ John Nance Garner (D) ✓
1934	Hill McAlister (D)	29D, 4R	81D, 18R	Kenneth McKellar (D)	Nathan L. Bachman (D)	7D, 2R	Franklin D. Roosevelt/ John Nance Garner (D) ✓
1935	Hill McAlister (D)	28D, 5R	81D, 18R	Kenneth McKellar (D)	Nathan L. Bachman (D)	7D, 2R	Franklin D. Roosevelt/ John Nance Garner (D) ✓
1936	Hill McAlister (D)	28D, 5R	81D, 18R	Kenneth McKellar (D)	Nathan L. Bachman (D)	7D, 2R	Franklin D. Roosevelt/ John Nance Garner (D) ✓
1937	Gordon Browning (D)	29D, 4R	81D, 18R	Kenneth McKellar (D)	Nathan L. Bachman (D)	7D, 2R	Franklin D. Roosevelt/ John Nance Garner (D) ✓
1937	Gordon Browning (D)	29D, 4R	81D, 18R	Kenneth McKellar (D)	George L. Berry (D)	7D, 2R	Franklin D. Roosevelt/ John Nance Garner (D) ✓
1938	Gordon Browning (D)	29D, 4R	81D, 18R	Kenneth McKellar (D)	George L. Berry (D)	7D, 2R	Franklin D. Roosevelt/ John Nance Garner (D) ✓
1939	Prentice Cooper (D)	29D, 4R	83D, 16R	Kenneth McKellar (D)	Tom Stewart (D)	7D, 2R	Franklin D. Roosevelt/ John Nance Garner (D) ✓
1940	Prentice Cooper (D)	29D, 4R	83D, 16R	Kenneth McKellar (D)	Tom Stewart (D)	7D, 2R	Franklin D. Roosevelt/ Henry A. Wallace (D) ✓
1941	Prentice Cooper (D)	29D, 4R	83D, 16R	Kenneth McKellar (D)	Tom Stewart (D)	7D, 2R	Franklin D. Roosevelt/ Henry A. Wallace (D) ✓
1942	Prentice Cooper (D)	29D, 4R	83D, 16R	Kenneth McKellar (D)	Tom Stewart (D)	7D, 2R	Franklin D. Roosevelt/ Henry A. Wallace (D) ✓
1943	Prentice Cooper (D)	30D, 3R	78D, 20R, 1I	Kenneth McKellar (D)	Tom Stewart (D)	8D, 2R	Franklin D. Roosevelt/ Henry A. Wallace (D) ✓
1944	Prentice Cooper (D)	30D, 3R	78D, 20R, 1I	Kenneth McKellar (D)	Tom Stewart (D)	8D, 2R	Franklin D. Roosevelt/ Harry S. Truman (D) ✓
1945	Jim Nance McCord (D)	28D, 5R	75D, 24R	Kenneth McKellar (D)	Tom Stewart (D)	8D, 2R	Franklin D. Roosevelt/ Harry S. Truman (D) ✓
1946	Jim Nance McCord (D)	28D, 5R	75D, 24R	Kenneth McKellar (D)	Tom Stewart (D)	8D, 2R	Franklin D. Roosevelt/ Harry S. Truman (D) ✓
1947	Jim Nance McCord (D)	29D, 4R	82D, 17R	Kenneth McKellar (D)	Tom Stewart (D)	8D, 2R	Franklin D. Roosevelt/ Harry S. Truman (D) ✓
1948	Jim Nance McCord (D)	29D, 4R	82D, 17R	Kenneth McKellar (D)	Tom Stewart (D)	8D, 2R	Harry S. Truman/ Alben W. Barkley (D) ✓
1949	Gordon Browning (D)	29D, 4R	80D, 19R	Kenneth McKellar (D)	Estes Kefauver (D)	8D, 2R	Harry S. Truman/ Alben W. Barkley (D) ✓
1950	Gordon Browning (D)	29D, 4R	80D, 19R	Kenneth McKellar (D)	Estes Kefauver (D)	8D, 2R	Harry S. Truman/ Alben W. Barkley (D) ✓
1951	Gordon Browning (D)	29D, 4R	80D, 19R	Kenneth McKellar (D)	Estes Kefauver (D)	8D, 2R	Harry S. Truman/ Alben W. Barkley (D) ✓
1952	Gordon Browning (D)	29D, 4R	80D, 19R	Kenneth McKellar (D)	Estes Kefauver (D)	8D, 2R	Dwight D. Eisenhower/ Richard Nixon (R) ✓
1953	Frank G. Clement (D)	28D, 5R	81D, 18R	Albert Gore Sr. (D)	Estes Kefauver (D)	7D, 2R	Dwight D. Eisenhower/ Richard Nixon (R) ✓
1954	Frank G. Clement (D)	28D, 5R	81D, 18R	Albert Gore Sr. (D)	Estes Kefauver (D)	7D, 2R	Dwight D. Eisenhower/ Richard Nixon (R) ✓
1955	Frank G. Clement (D)	28D, 5R	80D, 19R	Albert Gore Sr. (D)	Estes Kefauver (D)	7D, 2R	Dwight D. Eisenhower/ Richard Nixon (R) ✓
1956	Frank G. Clement (D)	28D, 5R	80D, 19R	Albert Gore Sr. (D)	Estes Kefauver (D)	7D, 2R	Dwight D. Eisenhower/ Richard Nixon (R) ✓
1957	Frank G. Clement (D)	27D, 6R	78D, 21R	Albert Gore Sr. (D)	Estes Kefauver (D)	7D, 2R	Dwight D. Eisenhower/ Richard Nixon (R) ✓
1958	Frank G. Clement (D)	27D, 6R	78D, 21R	Albert Gore Sr. (D)	Estes Kefauver (D)	7D, 2R	Dwight D. Eisenhower/ Richard Nixon (R) ✓
1959	Buford Ellington (D)	28D, 5R	82D, 17R	Albert Gore Sr. (D)	Estes Kefauver (D)	7D, 2R	Dwight D. Eisenhower/ Richard Nixon (R) ✓
1960	Buford Ellington (D)	28D, 5R	82D, 17R	Albert Gore Sr. (D)	Estes Kefauver (D)	7D, 2R	Richard Nixon/ Henry Cabot Lodge Jr. (R) ✗
1961	Buford Ellington (D)	27D, 6R	81D, 18R	Albert Gore Sr. (D)	Estes Kefauver (D)	7D, 2R	Richard Nixon/ Henry Cabot Lodge Jr. (R) ✗
1962	Buford Ellington (D)	27D, 6R	81D, 18R	Albert Gore Sr. (D)	Estes Kefauver (D)	7D, 2R	Richard Nixon/ Henry Cabot Lodge Jr. (R) ✗
1963	Frank G. Clement (D)	27D, 6R	78D, 21R	Albert Gore Sr. (D)	Herbert S. Walters (D)	6D, 3R	Richard Nixon/ Henry Cabot Lodge Jr. (R) ✗
1964	Frank G. Clement (D)	27D, 6R	78D, 21R	Albert Gore Sr. (D)	Herbert S. Walters (D)	6D, 3R	Lyndon B. Johnson/ Hubert Humphrey (D) ✓
1965	Frank G. Clement (D)	25D, 8R	74D, 25R	Albert Gore Sr. (D)	Ross Bass (D)	6D, 3R	Lyndon B. Johnson/ Hubert Humphrey (D) ✓
1966	Frank G. Clement (D)	25D, 8R	74D, 25R	Albert Gore Sr. (D)	Ross Bass (D)	6D, 3R	Lyndon B. Johnson/ Hubert Humphrey (D) ✓
1967	Buford Ellington (D)	25D, 8R	58D, 41R	Albert Gore Sr. (D)	Howard Baker (R)	5D, 4R	Lyndon B. Johnson/ Hubert Humphrey (D) ✓
1968	Buford Ellington (D)	25D, 8R	58D, 41R	Albert Gore Sr. (D)	Howard Baker (R)	5D, 4R	Richard Nixon/ Spiro Agnew (R) ✓
1969	Buford Ellington (D)	20D, 13R	49R, 49D, 1I (Note: The Independent and one Democrat supported Republican Bill Jenkins in the vote for Speaker, giving the Republicans control for the only time in the 20th Century.)	Albert Gore Sr. (D)	Howard Baker (R)	5D, 4R	Richard Nixon/ Spiro Agnew (R) ✓
1970	Buford Ellington (D)	21D, 12R	49R, 49D, 1I	Albert Gore Sr. (D)	Howard Baker (R)	5D, 4R	Richard Nixon/ Spiro Agnew (R) ✓
1971	Winfield Dunn (R)	19D, 13R, 1A	56D, 43R	Bill Brock (R)	Howard Baker (R)	5D, 4R	Richard Nixon/ Spiro Agnew (R) ✓
1972	Winfield Dunn (R)	19D, 13R, 1A	56D, 43R	Bill Brock (R)	Howard Baker (R)	5D, 4R	Richard Nixon/ Spiro Agnew (R) ✓
1973	Winfield Dunn (R)	19D, 13R, 1A	51D, 48R	Bill Brock (R)	Howard Baker (R)	5R, 3D	Richard Nixon/ Spiro Agnew (R) ✓
1974	Winfield Dunn (R)	19D, 13R, 1A	51D, 48R	Bill Brock (R)	Howard Baker (R)	5R, 3D	Richard Nixon/ Spiro Agnew (R) ✓
1975	Ray Blanton (D)	20D, 12R, 1I	63D, 35R, 1I	Bill Brock (R)	Howard Baker (R)	5D, 3R	Richard Nixon/ Spiro Agnew (R) ✓
1976	Ray Blanton (D)	20D, 12R, 1I	63D, 35R, 1I	Bill Brock (R)	Howard Baker (R)	5D, 3R	Jimmy Carter/ Walter Mondale (D) ✓
1977	Ray Blanton (D)	23D, 9R, 1I	66D, 32R, 1I	Jim Sasser (D)	Howard Baker (R)	5D, 3R	Jimmy Carter/ Walter Mondale (D) ✓
1978	Ray Blanton (D)	23D, 9R, 1I	66D, 32R, 1I	Jim Sasser (D)	Howard Baker (R)	5D, 3R	Jimmy Carter/ Walter Mondale (D) ✓
1979	Lamar Alexander (R)	20D, 12R, 1I	60D, 38R, 1I	Jim Sasser (D)	Howard Baker (R)	5D, 3R	Jimmy Carter/ Walter Mondale (D) ✓
1980	Lamar Alexander (R)	20D, 12R, 1I	60D, 38R, 1I	Jim Sasser (D)	Howard Baker (R)	5D, 3R	Ronald Reagan/ George H. W. Bush (R) ✓
1981	Lamar Alexander (R)	20D, 12R, 1I	58D, 39R, 2I	Jim Sasser (D)	Howard Baker (R)	5D, 3R	Ronald Reagan/ George H. W. Bush (R) ✓
1982	Lamar Alexander (R)	21D, 11R, 1I	58D, 39R, 2I	Jim Sasser (D)	Howard Baker (R)	5D, 3R	Ronald Reagan/ George H. W. Bush (R) ✓
1983	Lamar Alexander (R)	21D, 11R, 1I	60D, 38R, 1I	Jim Sasser (D)	Howard Baker (R)	6D, 3R	Ronald Reagan/ George H. W. Bush (R) ✓
1984	Lamar Alexander (R)	22D, 11R	60D, 38R, 1I	Jim Sasser (D)	Howard Baker (R)	6D, 3R	Ronald Reagan/ George H. W. Bush (R) ✓
1985	Lamar Alexander (R)	23D, 10R	62D, 37R	Jim Sasser (D)	Al Gore (D) (Note: Resigned to take office as Vice President of the United States.)	6D, 3R	Ronald Reagan/ George H. W. Bush (R) ✓
1986	Lamar Alexander (R)	23D, 10R	62D, 37R	Jim Sasser (D)	Al Gore (D)	6D, 3R	Ronald Reagan/ George H. W. Bush (R) ✓
1987	Ned McWherter (D)	23D, 10R	61D, 38R	Jim Sasser (D)	Al Gore (D)	6D, 3R	Ronald Reagan/ George H. W. Bush (R) ✓
1988	Ned McWherter (D)	23D, 10R	61D, 38R	Jim Sasser (D)	Al Gore (D)	6D, 3R	George H. W. Bush/ Dan Quayle (R) ✓
1989	Ned McWherter (D)	22D, 11R	59D, 40R	Jim Sasser (D)	Al Gore (D)	6D, 3R	George H. W. Bush/ Dan Quayle (R) ✓
1990	Ned McWherter (D)	22D, 11R	59D, 40R	Jim Sasser (D)	Al Gore (D)	6D, 3R	George H. W. Bush/ Dan Quayle (R) ✓
1991	Ned McWherter (D)	20D, 13R	55D, 44R	Jim Sasser (D)	Al Gore (D)	6D, 3R	George H. W. Bush/ Dan Quayle (R) ✓
1992	Ned McWherter (D)	20D, 13R	55D, 44R	Jim Sasser (D)	Al Gore (D)	6D, 3R	Bill Clinton/ Al Gore (D) ✓
1993	Ned McWherter (D)	19D, 14R	64D, 35R	Jim Sasser (D)	Harlan Mathews (D) (Note: Appointed to fill a vacancy.)	6D, 3R	Bill Clinton/ Al Gore (D) ✓
1994	Ned McWherter (D)	19D, 14R	64D, 35R	Jim Sasser (D)	Harlan Mathews (D)	6D, 3R	Bill Clinton/ Al Gore (D) ✓
1995	Don Sundquist (R)	18D, 15R	59D, 40R	Bill Frist (R)	Fred Thompson (R) (Note: First elected in special election.)	5R, 4D	Bill Clinton/ Al Gore (D) ✓
1996	Don Sundquist (R)	17R, 16D (Note: Two Democratic Senators switched parties to Republican, giving the Republicans control.)	59D, 40R	Bill Frist (R)	Fred Thompson (R)	5R, 4D	Bill Clinton/ Al Gore (D) ✓
1997	Don Sundquist (R)	18D, 15R	61D, 38R	Bill Frist (R)	Fred Thompson (R)	5R, 4D	Bill Clinton/ Al Gore (D) ✓
1998	Don Sundquist (R)	18D, 15R	61D, 38R	Bill Frist (R)	Fred Thompson (R)	5R, 4D	Bill Clinton/ Al Gore (D) ✓
1999	Don Sundquist (R)	18D, 15R	59D, 40R	Bill Frist (R)	Fred Thompson (R)	5R, 4D	Bill Clinton/ Al Gore (D) ✓
2000	Don Sundquist (R)	18D, 15R	59D, 40R	Bill Frist (R)	Fred Thompson (R)	5R, 4D	George W. Bush/ Dick Cheney (R) ✓
2001	Don Sundquist (R)	18D, 15R	58D, 41R	Bill Frist (R)	Fred Thompson (R)	5R, 4D	George W. Bush/ Dick Cheney (R) ✓
2002	Don Sundquist (R)	18D, 15R	58D, 41R	Bill Frist (R)	Fred Thompson (R)	5R, 4D	George W. Bush/ Dick Cheney (R) ✓
2003	Phil Bredesen (D)	18D, 15R	54D, 45R	Bill Frist (R)	Lamar Alexander (R)	5D, 4R	George W. Bush/ Dick Cheney (R) ✓
2004	Phil Bredesen (D)	18D, 15R	54D, 45R	Bill Frist (R)	Lamar Alexander (R)	5D, 4R	George W. Bush/ Dick Cheney (R) ✓
2005	Phil Bredesen (D)	17R, 16D (Note: Re-elected John Shelton Wilder, a Democrat, to the Senate Speaker position as a minority-party Speaker.)	53D, 46R	Bill Frist (R)	Lamar Alexander (R)	5D, 4R	George W. Bush/ Dick Cheney (R) ✓
2006	Phil Bredesen (D)	18R, 15D (Note: In February 2006, Democratic senator Don McLeary switched his party affiliation to the Republican Party.)	53D, 46R	Bill Frist (R)	Lamar Alexander (R)	5D, 4R	George W. Bush/ Dick Cheney (R) ✓
2007	Phil Bredesen (D)	17R, 16D	53D, 46R	Bob Corker (R)	Lamar Alexander (R)	5D, 4R	George W. Bush/ Dick Cheney (R) ✓
2007	Phil Bredesen (D)	16R, 16D, 1I (Note: Senator Micheal R. Williams left the Republican party to become an independent.)	53D, 46R	Bob Corker (R)	Lamar Alexander (R)	5D, 4R	George W. Bush/ Dick Cheney (R) ✓
2008	Phil Bredesen (D)	16R, 16D, 1I	53D, 46R	Bob Corker (R)	Lamar Alexander (R)	5D, 4R	John McCain/ Sarah Palin (R) ✗
2009	Phil Bredesen (D)	19R, 14D	50R, 49D	Bob Corker (R)	Lamar Alexander (R)	5D, 4R	John McCain/ Sarah Palin (R) ✗
2009	Phil Bredesen (D)	19R, 14D	49R, 49D, 1CCR (Note: On February 10, 2009, the executive committee of the Tennessee Republican Party voted to strip Speaker of the House Kent Williams of his party affiliation after he colluded with Democrats to be elected speaker. Williams chose "Carter County Republican" as his new party designation.)	Bob Corker (R)	Lamar Alexander (R)	5D, 4R	John McCain/ Sarah Palin (R) ✗
2010	Phil Bredesen (D)	19R, 14D	50R, 48D, 1I	Bob Corker (R)	Lamar Alexander (R)	5D, 4R	John McCain/ Sarah Palin (R) ✗
2011	Bill Haslam (R)	20R, 13D	64R, 34D, 1I	Bob Corker (R)	Lamar Alexander (R)	7R, 2D	John McCain/ Sarah Palin (R) ✗
2012	Bill Haslam (R)	20R, 13D	64R, 34D, 1I	Bob Corker (R)	Lamar Alexander (R)	7R, 2D	Mitt Romney/ Paul Ryan (R) ✗
2013	Bill Haslam (R)	26R, 7D	71R, 27D, 1I	Bob Corker (R)	Lamar Alexander (R)	7R, 2D	Mitt Romney/ Paul Ryan (R) ✗
2014	Bill Haslam (R)	26R, 7D	72R, 26D, 1I (Note: In January 2014, Democrat Charles Curtiss, who represented District 43, resigned to become the executive director of the Tennessee County Commissioners Association. Following his resignation, the White and Warren County commissions appointed Republican Paul Bailey to fill the vacancy for the remainder of the 108th General Assembly.)	Bob Corker (R)	Lamar Alexander (R)	7R, 2D	Mitt Romney/ Paul Ryan (R) ✗
2015	Bill Haslam (R)	28R, 5D	73R, 26D	Bob Corker (R)	Lamar Alexander (R)	7R, 2D	Mitt Romney/ Paul Ryan (R) ✗
2016	Bill Haslam (R)	28R, 5D	73R, 26D	Bob Corker (R)	Lamar Alexander (R)	7R, 2D	Donald Trump/ Mike Pence (R) ✓
2017	Bill Haslam (R)	28R, 5D	74R, 25D	Bob Corker (R)	Lamar Alexander (R)	7R, 2D	Donald Trump/ Mike Pence (R) ✓
2018	Bill Haslam (R)	28R, 5D	74R, 25D	Bob Corker (R)	Lamar Alexander (R)	7R, 2D	Donald Trump/ Mike Pence (R) ✓
2019	Bill Lee (R)	28R, 5D	73R, 26D	Marsha Blackburn (R)	Lamar Alexander (R)	7R, 2D	Donald Trump/ Mike Pence (R) ✓
2020	Bill Lee (R)	28R, 5D	73R, 26D	Marsha Blackburn (R)	Lamar Alexander (R)	7R, 2D	Donald Trump/ Mike Pence (R) ✗
2021	Bill Lee (R)	27R, 6D	73R, 26D	Marsha Blackburn (R)	Bill Hagerty (R)	7R, 2D	Donald Trump/ Mike Pence (R) ✗
2022	Bill Lee (R)	27R, 6D	73R, 26D	Marsha Blackburn (R)	Bill Hagerty (R)	7R, 2D	Donald Trump/ Mike Pence (R) ✗
2023	Bill Lee (R)	27R, 6D	75R, 24D	Marsha Blackburn (R)	Bill Hagerty (R)	8R, 1D	Donald Trump/ Mike Pence (R) ✗
2024	Bill Lee (R)	27R, 6D	75R, 24D	Marsha Blackburn (R)	Bill Hagerty (R)	8R, 1D	Donald Trump/ JD Vance (R) ✓
2025	Bill Lee (R)	27R, 6D	75R, 24D	Marsha Blackburn (R)	Bill Hagerty (R)	8R, 1D	Donald Trump/ JD Vance (R) ✓
2026	Bill Lee (R)	27R, 6D	75R, 24D	Marsha Blackburn (R)	Bill Hagerty (R)	8R, 1D	Donald Trump/ JD Vance (R) ✓
2027	Marsha Blackburn (R)	27R, 6D	69R, 30D	TBD (R) (Note: Blackburn's seat will become vacant when she takes office as governor; she will appoint a Republican successor.)	Bill Hagerty (R)	8R, 1D	Donald Trump/ JD Vance (R) ✓

== Political history of Tennessee ==
=== Pre-Civil War ===
In 1789, the new United States designated this area as the "Territory of the United States, South of the River Ohio." Even though Tennessee was not yet a state, some government was organized to administer the territory. William Blount was appointed as the first official governor of Tennessee, James White became the state's first representative in Congress, and Tennessee's political party history under European Americans was started. The majority party in Tennessee began as the Democratic-Republican party and operated until 1828. That year it was dissolved and the Democratic Party was formed.

From 1828, control of Tennessee state government alternated initially between the Democratic Party and the on. Whig Party in opposition. It later became the Republican Party, shortly before the American Civil War began in 1861. While these two parties fought for the majority during these years, the Know-Nothing Party, Unionist Party, and Constitutional Party were also active in the state. Their representatives were elected to state government, but did not dominate it. The politics of Middle and Western Tennessee were dominated by planters and slaveholders, especially the major planters in the western Delta area of Memphis and environs near the Mississippi River. Overseeing a large population of enslaved African Americans, planters voted to secede at the time of the Civil War in order to protect slavery, which was profitable for them and the commodity crop of cotton. Eastern Tennessee, by contrast, had a population with higher representation of white yeomen and subsistence farmers and artisans. They supported the Union during the Civil War and resisted secession.

=== Civil War to WWII ===
From the Civil War until World War II, Tennessee was controlled by the Democratic Party, made up of conservative whites in the state, especially of the planter and former slaveholding class. Together with other white Democratic Southerners in Congress, they formed a voting block known as the Solid South. Based on the seniority rules of the time and their virtually unrestricted control of seats from Southern states by having disenfranchised most African American at the turn of the century, senior Congressmen and Senators from the South controlled chairmanships of important committees, strongly influencing national policy. During the Great Depression, they limited benefits for African Americans in the South.

=== World War II to present day ===
During the period from 1939 until about 1970, the conservative whites of the Democratic party in Tennessee largely controlled the state politically. A minority of Republican voters were dominant in the eastern part of the state, which had favored the Union during the Civil War. But the state had been more competitive between its two parties than others in the South, as more blacks had retained their ability to vote and supported the Republican Party into the early 20th century.

From 1928 through 2004, with the exception of 1960, Tennessee voted for the winner of the Electoral College in races for President of the United States. This made the Volunteer State one of the few Bellwether states in the traditional South.

In 1976, Tennessee voted for Democrat Jimmy Carter of neighboring Georgia, a "favorite son" of the South. Similarly, in 1992 and 1996, Tennessee voted for the Democratic ticket of Governor Bill Clinton of Arkansas and Al Gore, a US senator from Tennessee, both sons of the South. But in 2000, Tennessee voted for Republican George W. Bush over Al Gore by single digit margins. Since 2000, Tennessee has become a Republican stronghold, voting increasingly Republican in all following elections.

== See also ==
- Elections in Tennessee
- Politics in Tennessee
- United States presidential elections in Tennessee
- List of United States senators from Tennessee
- List of United States representatives from Tennessee
- Tennessee Senate
- Tennessee House of Representatives
