= List of United States representatives in the 8th Congress =

This is a complete list of United States representatives during the 8th United States Congress listed by seniority. For the most part, representatives are ranked by the beginning of their terms in office.

As an historical article, the districts and party affiliations listed reflect those during the 8th Congress (March 4, 1803 – March 3, 1805). Seats and party affiliations on similar lists for other congresses will be different for certain members.

This article describes the criteria for seniority in the House of Representatives and sets out the list of members by seniority. It is prepared on the basis of the interpretation of seniority applied to the House of Representatives in the current congress. In the absence of information to the contrary, it is presumed that the twenty-first-century practice is identical to the seniority customs used during the 8th Congress.

== House seniority ==
Seniority in the House, for representatives with unbroken service, depends on the date on which the members first term began. That date is either the start of the Congress (4 March in odd numbered years, for the era up to and including the 73rd Congress starting in 1933) or the date of a special election during the Congress. Since many members start serving on the same day as others, ranking between them is based on alphabetical order by the last name of the representative.

Representatives in early congresses were often elected after the legal start of the Congress. Such representatives are attributed with unbroken seniority, from the legal start of the congressional term, if they were the first person elected to a seat in a Congress. The date of the election is indicated in a note.

The seniority date is normally taken from the members entry in the Biographical Directory of the United States Congress, except where the date given is the legal start of the Congress and the actual election (for someone who was not the first person elected to the seat in that Congress) was later. The date of election is taken from United States Congressional Elections 1788-1997. In a few instances the latter work provides dates, for the start and end of terms, which correct those in the Biographical Directory.

The Biographical Directory normally uses the date of a special election, as the seniority date. However, mostly in early congresses, the date of the member taking his seat can be the one given. The date of the special election is mentioned in a note to the list below, when that date is not used as the seniority date by the Biographical Directory.

Representatives who returned to the House, after having previously served, are credited with service equal to one less than the total number of terms they served. When a representative has served a prior term of less than two terms (i.e. prior term minus one equals less than one), he is ranked above all others whose service begins on the same day.

== Leadership ==
In this Congress the only formal leader was the speaker of the House. A speakership ballot was held on October 17, 1803, and Nathaniel Macon (DR-NC) was re-elected for a second consecutive term.

== Standing committees ==
The House created its first standing committee, on April 13, 1789. There were five standing committees, listed in the rules initially used by the 8th Congress. In addition an Accounts Committee was created.

Committees, in this period, were appointed for a session at a time by the speaker.

This list refers to the standing committees of the House in the 8th Congress, the year of establishment as a standing committee, the number of members assigned to the committee and the dates of appointment in each session, the end of the session and its chairman. Chairmen, who were re-appointed after serving in the previous Congress, are indicated by an *.

The first session was October 17, 1803 – March 27, 1804 (163 days) and the second session was November 5, 1804 – March 3, 1805 (119 days).

| No. | Committee | From | Members | Appointed | Chairman |
|---|---|---|---|---|---|
| 1 | Accounts | 1803 | 3 | December 27, 1803 – March 27, 1804 | Peter Early (DR-GA) |
| 1 | Accounts | 1803 | 3 | November 7, 1804 – March 3, 1805 | Peter Early (DR-GA) |
| 2 | Claims | 1794 | 7 | October 17, 1803 – March 27, 1804 | *John C. Smith (F-CT) a |
| 2 | Claims | 1794 | 7 | November 5, 1804 – March 3, 1805 | *John C. Smith (F-CT) a |
| 2 | Claims | 1794 | 7 | November 5, 1804 – March 3, 1805 | David Holmes (DR-VA) |
| 3 | Commerce and Manufactures | 1795 | 7 | October 17, 1803 – March 27, 1804 | Samuel L. Mitchill (DR-NY) b |
| 3 | Commerce and Manufactures | 1795 | 7 | November 5, 1804 – March 3, 1805 | Samuel L. Mitchill (DR-NY) b |
| 3 | Commerce and Manufactures | 1795 | 7 | November 5, 1804 – March 3, 1805 | Jacob Crowninshield (DR-MA) |
| 4 | Elections | 1789 | 7 | October 17, 1803 – March 27, 1804 | William Findley (DR-PA) |
| 4 | Elections | 1789 | 7 | November 5, 1804 – March 3, 1805 | William Findley (DR-PA) |
| 5 | Revisal and Unfinished Business | 1795 | 3 | October 17, 1803 – March 27, 1804 | Samuel Tenney (F-NH) |
| 5 | Revisal and Unfinished Business | 1795 | 3 | November 5, 1804 – March 3, 1805 | Samuel Tenney (F-NH) |
| 6 | Ways and Means | 1802 | 7 | October 17, 1803 – March 27, 1804 | *John Randolph (DR-VA) |
| 6 | Ways and Means | 1802 | 7 | November 5, 1804 – March 3, 1805 | *John Randolph (DR-VA) |

Notes:-

- a John C. Smith was excused, from service on the Claims Committee, on November 6, 1804. David Holmes was the next ranking member of the Committee (and was the Chairman in part of the 9th Congress) so it is presumed that he replaced Smith as Chairman.
- b Samuel L. Mitchill resigned from the House on November 22, 1804. Jacob Crowninshield was the next ranking member of the Commerce and Manufactures Committee (and was the Chairman in the 9th Congress) so it is presumed that he replaced Mitchill as Chairman.

== List of representatives by seniority ==
A numerical rank is assigned to each of the 142 members initially elected to the 8th Congress. Other members, who were not the first person elected to a seat but who joined the House during the Congress, are not assigned a number.

Four representatives-elect were not sworn in, as one died and three resigned. The list below includes the representatives-elect (with name in italics), with the seniority they would have held if they had been sworn in.

Party designations used in this article are DR for Democratic-Republican members and F for Federalist representatives. Designations used for service in the first three congresses are (A) for Anti-Administration members and (P) for Pro-Administration representatives.

U.S. House seniority
| Rank | Representative | Party | District | Seniority date | Notes |
|---|---|---|---|---|---|
Seven consecutive terms
| 1 | Andrew Gregg | DR | PA-5 | March 4, 1791 | (A) 1791-95 |
| 2 | Nathaniel Macon | DR | NC-6 | March 4, 1791 | (A) 1791–95. Elected to this Congress: August 11, 1803. Speaker of the House. |
Six consecutive terms
| 3 | Anthony New | DR | VA-11 | March 4, 1793 | (A) 1793–95. Elected to this Congress: April 1803. Last term while serving as a member of the House until 12th Congress. |
| 4 | Philip Van Cortlandt | DR | NY-4 | March 4, 1793 | (A) 1793-95 |
| 5 | Peleg Wadsworth | F | MA-15 | March 4, 1793 | (P) 1793-95 |
Six non-consecutive terms
| 6 | Daniel Hiester | DR | MD-4 | March 4, 1801 | Previously served (PA-A) 1789-95 and (PA-DR) 1795-July 1, 1796, while still as a member of the House. Elected to this Congress: October 3, 1803. Died on March 7, 1804, while still serving as a member of the House. |
Five consecutive terms
| 7 | Roger Griswold | F | CT-al | March 4, 1795 | Last term while serving as a member of the House (elected to 9th Congress but did not serve) |
| 8 | Joseph B. Varnum | DR | MA-4 | March 4, 1795 | |
| 9 | Samuel W. Dana | F | CT-al | January 3, 1797 | |
Five non-consecutive terms
| 10 | Thomas Claiborne | DR | VA-17 | March 4, 1801 | Previously served (A) 1793-95 and (DR) 1795-99 while as a member of the House.. Elected to this Congress: April 1803. Last term while serving as a member of the House. |
| 11 | William Findley | DR | PA-8 | March 4, 1803 | Previously served (A) 1791-95 and (DR) 1795-99 while as a member of the House. Chairman: Elections. |
| 12 | John Milledge | DR | GA-al | March 23, 1801 | Previously served (A) November 22, 1792–93 and (DR) 1795-99 while as a member of the House.. Resigned, as Representative-elect, to become Governor: c. November 9, 1802. |
Four consecutive terms
| 13 | Matthew Clay | DR | VA-14 | March 4, 1797 | Elected to this Congress: April 1803 |
| 14 | John Dawson | DR | VA-10 | March 4, 1797 | Elected to this Congress: April 1803 |
| 15 | John Dennis | F | MD-8 | March 4, 1797 | Elected to this Congress: October 3, 1803. Last term while serving as a member of the House. |
| 16 | John Fowler | DR | KY-5 | March 4, 1797 | Elected to this Congress: August 2, 1803 |
| 17 | John A. Hanna | DR | PA-4 | March 4, 1797 | |
| 18 | David Holmes | DR | VA-4 | March 4, 1797 | Elected to this Congress: April 1803. Chairman: Claims (1804–05). |
| 19 | Richard Stanford | DR | NC-8 | March 4, 1797 | Elected to this Congress: August 11, 1803 |
| 20 | Abram Trigg | DR | VA-6 | March 4, 1797 | Elected to this Congress: April 1803 |
| 21 | John J. Trigg | DR | VA-13 | March 4, 1797 | Elected to this Congress: April 1803. Died on May 17, 1804, while still serving as a member of the House. |
| 22 | Joseph Hiester | DR | PA-3 | December 1, 1798 | Last term while serving as a member of the House until 14th Congress |
| 23 | Robert Brown | DR | PA-2 | December 4, 1798 | |
Four non-consecutive terms
| 24 | John Clopton | DR | VA-22 | March 4, 1801 | Previously served (DR) 1795-99 while as a member of the House. Elected to this Congress: April 1803. |
| 25 | James Gillespie | DR | NC-5 | March 4, 1803 | Previously served (A) 1793-95 and (DR) 1795–99. Elected to this Congress: August 11, 1803. Died on January 11, 1805, while still serving as a member of the House. |
| 26 | John Smilie | DR | PA-9 | March 4, 1799 | Previously served (A) 1793-95 while as a member of the House. |
| 27 | Richard Winn | DR | SC-5 | January 24, 1803 | Previously served (A) 1793-95 and (DR) 1795-97 while as a member of the House. |
Three consecutive terms
| 28 | Willis Alston | DR | NC-2 | March 4, 1799 | Elected to this Congress: August 11, 1803 |
| 29 | Phanuel Bishop | DR | MA-9 | March 4, 1799 | |
| 30 | John Davenport | F | CT-al | March 4, 1799 | |
| 31 | Edwin Gray | DR | VA-19 | March 4, 1799 | Elected to this Congress: April 1803 |
| 32 | Benjamin Huger | F | SC-3 | March 4, 1799 | Last term while serving as a member of the House until 14th Congress |
| 33 | Michael Leib | DR | PA-1 | March 4, 1799 | |
| 34 | Joseph H. Nicholson | DR | MD-7 | March 4, 1799 | Elected to this Congress: October 3, 1803 |
| 35 | John Randolph | DR | VA-15 | March 4, 1799 | Elected to this Congress: April 1803. Chairman: Ways and Means. |
| 36 | Lemuel Williams | F | MA-8 | March 4, 1799 | Last term |
| 37 | John Smith | DR | NY-1 | February 6, 1800 | Resigned on February 23, 1804, while still serving as a member of the House. |
| 38 | John C. Smith | F | CT-al | November 17, 1800 | Chairman: Claims (1803–04) |
| 39 | Samuel Tenney | F | NH-al | December 8, 1800 | Chairman: Revisal and Unfinished Business |
| 40 | John Stewart | DR | PA-6 | January 15, 1801 | Last term |
Three non-consecutive terms
| 41 | David Bard | DR | PA-4 | March 4, 1803 | Previously served (DR) 1795-99 while still serving as a member of the House. |
| 42 | James Holland | DR | NC-11 | March 4, 1801 | Previously served (DR) 1795-97 while as a member of the House. Elected to this Congress: August 11, 1803. |
| 43 | Matthew Lyon | DR | KY-1 | March 4, 1803 | Previously served (DR-VT) 1797-1801 while as a member of the House. Elected to this Congress: August 2, 1803. |
| 44 | Thomson J. Skinner | DR | MA-12 | March 4, 1803 | Previously served (DR) January 27, 1797–99. Resigned on August 10, 1804, while still serving as a member of the House. |
Two consecutive terms
| 45 | John Archer | DR | MD-6 | March 4, 1801 | Elected to this Congress: October 3, 1803 |
| 46 | William Butler | DR | SC-2 | March 4, 1801 | |
| 47 | John Campbell | F | MD-1 | March 4, 1801 | Elected to this Congress: October 3, 1803 |
| 48 | Manasseh Cutler | F | MA-3 | March 4, 1801 | Last term |
| 49 | Ebenezer Elmer | DR | NJ-al | March 4, 1801 | Elected to this Congress: December 13–14, 1803 |
| 50 | William Eustis | DR | MA-1 | March 4, 1801 | Last term until 17th Congress |
| 51 | William Helms | DR | NJ-al | March 4, 1801 | Elected to this Congress: December 13–14, 1803 |
| 52 | Thomas Lowndes | F | SC-1 | March 4, 1801 | Last term while still serving as a member of the House. |
| 53 | Samuel L. Mitchill | DR | NY-3 | March 4, 1801 | Chairman: Commerce and Manufactures (1803–04). Resigned, to become US Senator: November 22, 1804. Elected to 9th Congress, but did not serve. |
| 54 | Thomas Moore | DR | SC-7 | March 4, 1801 | |
| 55 | James Mott | DR | NJ-al | March 4, 1801 | Elected to this Congress: December 13–14, 1803. Last term while serving as a member of the House. |
| 56 | Thomas Newton, Jr. | DR | VA-20 | March 4, 1801 | Elected to this Congress: April 1803 |
| 57 | Elias Perkins | F | CT-al | March 4, 1801 | Resigned as Representative-elect: c. August 1803 |
| 58 | Thomas Plater | F | MD-3 | March 4, 1801 | Elected to this Congress: October 3, 1803. Last term while still serving as a member of the House. |
| 59 | John Smith | DR | VA-3 | March 4, 1801 | Elected to this Congress: April 1803 |
| 60 | Henry Southard | DR | NJ-al | March 4, 1801 | Elected to this Congress: December 13–14, 1803 |
| 61 | Joseph Stanton, Jr. | DR | RI-al | March 4, 1801 | |
| 62 | David Thomas | DR | NY-12 | March 4, 1801 | |
| 63 | Philip R. Thompson | DR | VA-9 | March 4, 1801 | Elected to this Congress: April 1803 |
| 64 | Killian K. Van Rensselaer | F | NY-9 | March 4, 1801 | |
| 65 | Calvin Goddard | F | CT-al | May 14, 1801 | Last term (elected to 9th Congress but did not serve) |
| 66 | Richard Cutts | DR | MA-14 | June 22, 1801 | |
| 67 | Seth Hastings | F | MA-10 | August 24, 1801 | |
| 68 | Benjamin Tallmadge | F | CT-al | September 21, 1801 | |
| 69 | William Hoge | DR | PA-10 | October 13, 1801 | Resigned on October 15, 1804, while still serving as a member of the House. Last term until 10th Congress. |
| 70 | Isaac Van Horne | DR | PA-2 | October 13, 1801 | Last term while serving as a member of the House. |
| 71 | William Dickson | DR | TN-al | October 30, 1801 | Elected to this Congress: August 4–5, 1803 |
| 72 | Walter Bowie | DR | MD-2 | March 24, 1802 | Elected to this Congress: October 3, 1803. Last term. |
| 73 | Samuel Hunt | F | NH-al | December 6, 1802 | Last term while serving as a member of the House. |
| 74 | David Meriwether | DR | GA-al | December 6, 1802 | |
| 75 | Samuel Thatcher | F | MA-16 | December 6, 1802 | Last term while serving as a member of the House. |
| 76 | Thomas Wynns | DR | NC-1 | December 7, 1802 | Elected to this Congress: August 11, 1803 |
| 77 | Peter Early | DR | GA-al | January 10, 1803 | Chairman: Accounts |
Two non-consecutive terms
| 78 | Wade Hampton | DR | SC-4 | March 4, 1803 | Previously served (DR) 1795-97 while as a member of the House. Last term while serving as a member of the House. |
| 79 | Walter Jones | DR | VA-8 | March 4, 1803 | Previously served (DR) 1797-99 while as a member of the House. Elected to this Congress: April 1803. |
| 80 | Joseph Winston | DR | NC-12 | March 4, 1803 | Previously served (A) 1793-95 while as a member of the House. Elected to this Congress: August 11, 1803. |
One term
| 81 | Nathaniel Alexander | DR | NC-10 | March 4, 1803 | Elected to this Congress: August 11, 1803 |
| 82 | Isaac Anderson | DR | PA-3 | March 4, 1803 | |
| 83 | George M. Bedinger | DR | KY-6 | March 4, 1803 | Elected to this Congress: August 2, 1803. |
| 84 | Silas Betton | F | NH-al | March 4, 1803 | |
| 85 | William Blackledge | DR | NC-4 | March 4, 1803 | Elected to this Congress: August 11, 1803 |
| 86 | Isaac Bloom | DR | NY-6 | March 4, 1803 | Died, as Representative-elect: April 26, 1803 |
| 87 | Adam Boyd | DR | NJ-al | March 4, 1803 | Elected to this Congress: December 13–14, 1803. Only term until 10th Congress while serving as a member of the House. |
| 88 | John Boyle | DR | KY-2 | March 4, 1803 | Elected to this Congress: August 2, 1803 |
| 89 | Phineas Bruce | F | MA-17 | March 4, 1803 | Only term while serving as a member of the House. |
| 90 | George W. Campbell | DR | TN-al | March 4, 1803 | Elected to this Congress: August 4–5, 1803 |
| 91 | John Cantine | F | NY-7 | March 4, 1803 | Resigned, as Representative-elect, before the Congress began* |
| 92 | Levi Casey | DR | SC-6 | March 4, 1803 | |
| 93 | William Chamberlain | F | VT-3 | March 4, 1803 | Only term while serving as a member of the House until 11th Congress |
| 94 | Martin Chittenden | F | VT-4 | March 4, 1803 | Elected to this Congress: May 9, 1803 |
| 95 | Clifton Clagett | F | NH-al | March 4, 1803 | Only term while serving as a member of the House until 15th Congress |
| 96 | Joseph Clay | DR | PA-1 | March 4, 1803 | |
| 97 | Frederick Conrad | DR | PA-2 | March 4, 1803 | |
| 98 | Jacob Crowninshield | DR | MA-2 | March 4, 1803 | Chairman: Commerce and Manufactures (1804–05) |
| 99 | Thomas Dwight | F | MA-5 | March 4, 1803 | Only term while serving as a member of the House. |
| 100 | John B. Earle | DR | SC-8 | March 4, 1803 | Only term while serving as a member of the House. |
| 101 | James Elliot | F | VT-2 | March 4, 1803 | |
| 102 | John W. Eppes | DR | VA-16 | March 4, 1803 | Elected to this Congress: April 1803 |
| 103 | Peterson Goodwyn | DR | VA-18 | March 4, 1803 | Elected to this Congress: April 1803 |
| 104 | Thomas Griffin | F | VA-12 | March 4, 1803 | Elected to this Congress: April 1803. Only term while serving as a member of the House. |
| 105 | Gaylord Griswold | F | NY-15 | March 4, 1803 | Only term while serving as a member of the House. |
| 106 | Samuel Hammond | DR | GA-al | March 4, 1803 | Resigned on February 2, 1805, while still serving as a member of the House. |
| 107 | David Hough | F | NH-al | March 4, 1803 | |
| 108 | John G. Jackson | DR | VA-1 | March 4, 1803 | Elected to this Congress: April 1803 |
| 109 | William Kennedy | DR | NC-3 | March 4, 1803 | Elected to this Congress: August 11, 1803. Only term while serving as a member of the House until 11th Congress |
| 110 | Nehemiah Knight | DR | RI-al | March 4, 1803 | |
| 111 | Joseph Lewis, Jr. | F | VA-7 | March 4, 1803 | Elected to this Congress: April 1803 |
| 112 | Thomas Lewis, Jr. | F | VA-5 | March 4, 1803 | Elected to this Congress: April 1803. Unseated, after an election contest: March 5, 1804. |
| 113 | Henry W. Livingston | F | NY-8 | March 4, 1803 | |
| 114 | John B. C. Lucas | DR | PA-11 | March 4, 1803 | |
| 115 | Andrew McCord | DR | NY-5 | March 4, 1803 | Only term while serving as a member of the House. |
| 116 | William McCreery | DR | MD-5 | March 4, 1803 | Elected to this Congress: October 3, 1803 |
| 117 | Nahum Mitchell | F | MA-7 | March 4, 1803 | Only term while serving as a member of the House. |
| 118 | Nicholas R. Moore | DR | MD-5 | March 4, 1803 | Elected to this Congress: October 3, 1803 |
| 119 | Jeremiah Morrow | DR | OH-al | March 4, 1803 | First representative of new state. Elected to this Congress: June 21, 1803. |
| 120 | Gideon Olin | DR | VT-1 | March 4, 1803 | |
| 121 | Beriah Palmer | DR | NY-11 | March 4, 1803 | Only term while serving as a member of the House. |
| 122 | John Paterson | DR | NY-16 | March 4, 1803 | Only term while serving as a member of the House. |
| 123 | Oliver Phelps | DR | NY-17 | March 4, 1803 | Only term while serving as a member of the House. |
| 124 | Samuel D. Purviance | F | NC-7 | March 4, 1803 | Elected to this Congress: August 11, 1803. Only term while serving as a member of the House. |
| 125 | Thomas M. Randolph | DR | VA-21 | March 4, 1803 | Elected to this Congress: April 1803 |
| 126 | John Rea | DR | PA-7 | March 4, 1803 | |
| 127 | John Rhea | DR | TN-al | March 4, 1803 | Elected to this Congress: August 4–5, 1803 |
| 128 | Jacob Richards | DR | PA-1 | March 4, 1803 | |
| 129 | Caesar A. Rodney | DR | DE-al | March 4, 1803 | Only term while serving as a member of the House until 17th Congress |
| 130 | Erastus Root | DR | NY-14 | March 4, 1803 | Only term while serving as a member of the House until 11th Congress |
| 131 | Thomas Sammons | DR | NY-13 | March 4, 1803 | |
| 132 | Thomas Sandford | DR | KY-4 | March 4, 1803 | Elected to this Congress: August 2, 1803 |
| 133 | Joshua Sands | F | NY-2 | March 4, 1803 | Only term while serving as a member of the House until 19th Congress |
| 134 | Ebenezer Seaver | DR | MA-13 | March 4, 1803 | |
| 135 | James Sloan | DR | NJ-al | March 4, 1803 | Elected to this Congress: December 13–14, 1803 |
| 136 | William Stedman | F | MA-11 | March 4, 1803 | |
| 137 | James Stephenson | F | VA-2 | March 4, 1803 | Elected to this Congress: April 1803. Only term while serving as a member of the House until 11th Congress |
| 138 | Samuel Taggart | F | MA-6 | March 4, 1803 | Elected to this Congress: April 3, 1803 |
| 139 | George Tibbits | F | NY-10 | March 4, 1803 | Only term while serving as a member of the House. |
| 140 | Matthew Walton | DR | KY-3 | March 4, 1803 | Elected to this Congress: August 2, 1803 |
| 141 | John Whitehill | DR | PA-3 | March 4, 1803 | |
| 142 | Marmaduke Williams | DR | NC-9 | March 4, 1803 | Elected to this Congress: August 11, 1803 |
Members joining the House, after the start of the Congress
| ... | Josiah Hasbrouck | DR | NY-7 | April 28, 1803 | Special election: April 26–28, 1803. Took seat: October 17, 1803. Only term while serving as a member of the House until 15th Congress |
| ... | Simeon Baldwin | F | CT-al | September 5, 1803 | Special election: September 5, 1803. Only term while serving as a member of the House. |
| ... | Joseph Bryan | DR | GA-al | October 3, 1803 | Special election |
| ... | Daniel C. Verplanck | DR | NY-6 | October 17, 1803 | Special election: September 14–16, 1803 |
| ... | Andrew Moore | DR | VA-5 | March 5, 1804 | Previously served (A) 1789-95 and (DR) 1796-97 while as a member of the House. Seated after election contest. Resigned upon appointment as US Senator: August 11, 1804. |
| ... | John Hoge | DR | PA-10 | November 2, 1804 | Special election. Only term. |
| ... | Christopher H. Clark | DR | VA-13 | November 5, 1804 | Special election: October 1804 |
| ... | Simon Larned | DR | MA-12 | November 5, 1804 | Special election: September 17, 1804. Only term while serving as a member of the House. |
| ... | Samuel Riker | DR | NY-1 | November 5, 1804 | Special election: April 24–26, 1804. Only term while serving as a member of the House until 10th Congress. |
| ... | Roger Nelson | DR | MD-4 | November 6, 1804 | Special election: October 1, 1804 |
| ... | Alexander Wilson | DR | VA-5 | December 4, 1804 | Special election: November 13, 1804 |
| ... | George Clinton, Jr. | DR | NY-3 | February 14, 1805 | Special election: January 2–4, 1805 |
Non voting member
| a | William Lattimore | - | MS-al | March 4, 1803 | Delegate from Mississippi Territory |

== See also ==
- 8th United States Congress
- List of United States congressional districts
- List of United States senators in the 8th Congress
