= List of United States senators in the 8th Congress =

This is a complete list of United States senators during the 8th United States Congress listed by seniority from March 4, 1803, to March 3, 1805.

The order of service is based on the commencement of the senator's first term, with senators entering service the same day ranked alphabetically.

The two main parties in the 8th Congress were the Federalists (F), and Democratic Republicans (DR).

== Terms of service ==
Class	Terms of service of senators that expired in years
Class 2	Terms of service of senators that expired in 1805 (DE, GA, KY, MA, NC, NH, NJ, RI, SC, TN, and VA.)
Class 3	Terms of service of senators that expired in 1807 (CT, DE, MD, NH, NJ, NY, OH, PA, RI, SC, and VT.)
Class 1	Terms of service of senators that expired in 1809 (CT, GA, IN, KY, LA, MA, MD, NC, NY, OH, PA, TN, VA, and VT.)

== U.S. Senate seniority list ==
U.S. Senate seniority
Rank	Senator (party-state)	Seniority date
1	John Brown (DR-KY)	June 18, 1792
2	Stevens Thomson Mason (DR-VA)	November 18, 1794
3	Uriah Tracy (F-CT)	October 13, 1796
4	James Hillhouse (F-CT)	May 18, 1796
5	Joseph Inslee Anderson (DR-TN)	September 26, 1797
6	William H. Wells (F-DE)	January 17, 1799
7	Abraham Baldwin (DR-GA)	March 4, 1799
8	William Cocke (DR-TN)	March 4, 1799
9	Jonathan Dayton (F-NJ)	March 4, 1799
10	Jesse Franklin (DR-NC)	March 4, 1799
11	Wilson Cary Nicholas (DR-VA)	December 5, 1799
12	Samuel White (F-DE)	February 28, 1801
15	John Breckinridge (DR-KY)	March 4, 1801
13	James Jackson (DR-GA)	March 4, 1801
14	David Stone (DR-NC)	March 4, 1801
16	Christopher Ellery (DR-RI)	May 6, 1801
17	Simeon Olcott (F-NH)	June 17, 1801
18	George Logan (DR-PA)	July 13, 1801
19	Stephen Row Bradley (DR-VT)	October 15, 1801
20	Robert Wright (DR-MD)	November 19, 1801
21	Thomas Sumter (DR-SC)	December 16, 1801
22	De Witt Clinton (DR-NY)	February 9, 1802
23	William Plumer (F-NH)	June 17, 1802
24	Pierce Butler (DR-SC)	November 4, 1802
25	John Quincy Adams (F-MA)	March 4, 1803
26	Theodorus Bailey (DR-NY)	March 4, 1803
27	Samuel Maclay (DR-PA)	March 4, 1803
28	Timothy Pickering (F-MA)	March 4, 1803
29	Samuel John Potter (DR-RI)	March 4, 1803
30	Israel Smith (DR-VT)	March 4, 1803
31	Samuel Smith (DR-MD)	March 4, 1803
32	John Smith (DR-OH)	April 1, 1803
33	Thomas Worthington (DR-OH)	April 1, 1803
34	John Taylor of Caroline (DR-VA)	June 4, 1803
35	John Condit (DR-NJ)	September 1, 1803
36	Abraham B. Venable (DR-VA)	December 7, 1803
37	John Smith (DR-NY)	February 23, 1804
38	John Armstrong Jr. (DR-NY)	February 25, 1804
39	William Branch Giles (DR-VA)	August 11, 1804
40	Andrew Moore (DR-VA)	August 11, 1804
41	Benjamin Howland (DR-RI)	October 29, 1804
42	James Asheton Bayard Sr. (F-DE)	November 9, 1804
43	Samuel L. Mitchill (DR-NY)	November 13, 1804
44	John Gaillard (DR-SC)	December 6, 1804

== See also ==
- 8th United States Congress
- List of United States representatives in the 8th Congress
