= Dragging Canoe =

Cherokee war chief and leader of the Chickamauga

- ᏥᏳ ᎦᏅᏏᏂ
- In office 1777–1792
- Succeeded by: John Watts

War chief of the Chickamauga Cherokee

Personal details
- Born: c. 1738 Overhill Cherokee territory
- Died: February 29, 1792 (aged 53–54) Running Water Town
- Cause of death: Exhaustion (possibly heart attack)
- Known for: Leading the Chickamauga Cherokee resistance against American settlers, 1777–1792

Military service
- Battles/wars: Anglo-Cherokee War · Battle of Island Flats (1776) · Cherokee–American wars

Dragging Canoe (Cherokee: ᏥᏳ ᎦᏅᏏᏂ, romanized: Tsiyu Gansini (Note: His name is misspelled "Dragon Canoe" in some historical records.) c. 1738 – February 29, 1792) was a Cherokee red (or war) chief who led a band of Cherokee warriors who resisted colonists and United States settlers in the Upper South. During the American Revolution and afterward, Dragging Canoe's forces were sometimes joined by Upper Muskogee, Chickasaw, Shawnee, and Native Americans from other tribes, along with British Loyalists, and agents of France and Spain. The Cherokee American Wars lasted more than a decade after the end of the American Revolutionary War.

During that time, Dragging Canoe became the preeminent war leader among the Native Americans of the southeastern United States. He served as war chief, or skiagusta, of the group known as the Chickamauga Cherokee (or "Lower Cherokee"), from 1777 until his death in 1792.

== Biography ==
Tsiyu Gansini was born about 1738. Dragging Canoe was the son of Attakullakulla (Tsalagi, or "Little Carpenter")—a Nipissing head-man—and Nionne Ollie ("Tame Doe"). (Note: Dragging Canoe's mother, Nionne Ollie, was a Natchez-adopted Cherokee.) Attakullakulla, Dragging Canoe's father, was born to the Nipissing near Lake Superior. His mother had been born to the Natchez but was adopted as a daughter by Cherokee Chief Oconostota's wife.[1]Many members of these two Native American groups then lived with the Cherokee (Note: Especially after their difficulties with the French, 1700-1731 and thereafter, many members of the Nipissing and Natchez migrated to Cherokee towns and took up residence there.) and had adapted to Cherokee society.

Dragging Canoe's family lived with the Overhill Cherokee on the Little Tennessee River in what is now southeast Tennessee. He survived smallpox at a young age, which left his face marked. Dragging Canoe's brother, The Badger, also became a Cherokee chief.

According to Cherokee legend, he was given his name because of an incident in his childhood. When he wanted to join a war party moving against the Shawnee, his father said that he could accompany the war party as long as he could carry his canoe. The youth tried to prove his readiness for war but could only drag the heavy canoe.

=== War chief of the Cherokee ===
Dragging Canoe had his first experience in actual combat during the Anglo-Cherokee War. In its aftermath, he was recognized as one of the strongest opponents to encroachment by white colonists onto Cherokee territories. Eventually, he became the headman of Mialoquo ("Great Island Town", "Amoyeli Egwa" in the Cherokee language) on the Little Tennessee River. When the Cherokee chose to ally with the British against the colonists at the onset of the Revolutionary War, Dragging Canoe was eager to fight and was assigned to be at the head of one of the major forces of the three-pronged attack which opened the war with the frontiersmen of the Overmountain settlements, with his force attacking Heaton's station in the Battle of Island Flats. (Note: The three-pronged attack was planned thusly: "...Old Abram led a contingent against the Watauga and Nolichucky settlements; warriors under the leadership of the Raven struck Carter's Valley; and Dragging Canoe fought at the Battle of Island Flats [ at modern Kingsport, Tennessee ] where he was wounded.") Dragging Canoe's cousin Nancy Ward (aka Nanyehi or ᎾᏅᏰᎯ in Cherokee) had warned white settlers of the impending attack. Dragging Canoe barely survived the battle.

=== Establishment of the Chickamauga towns ===
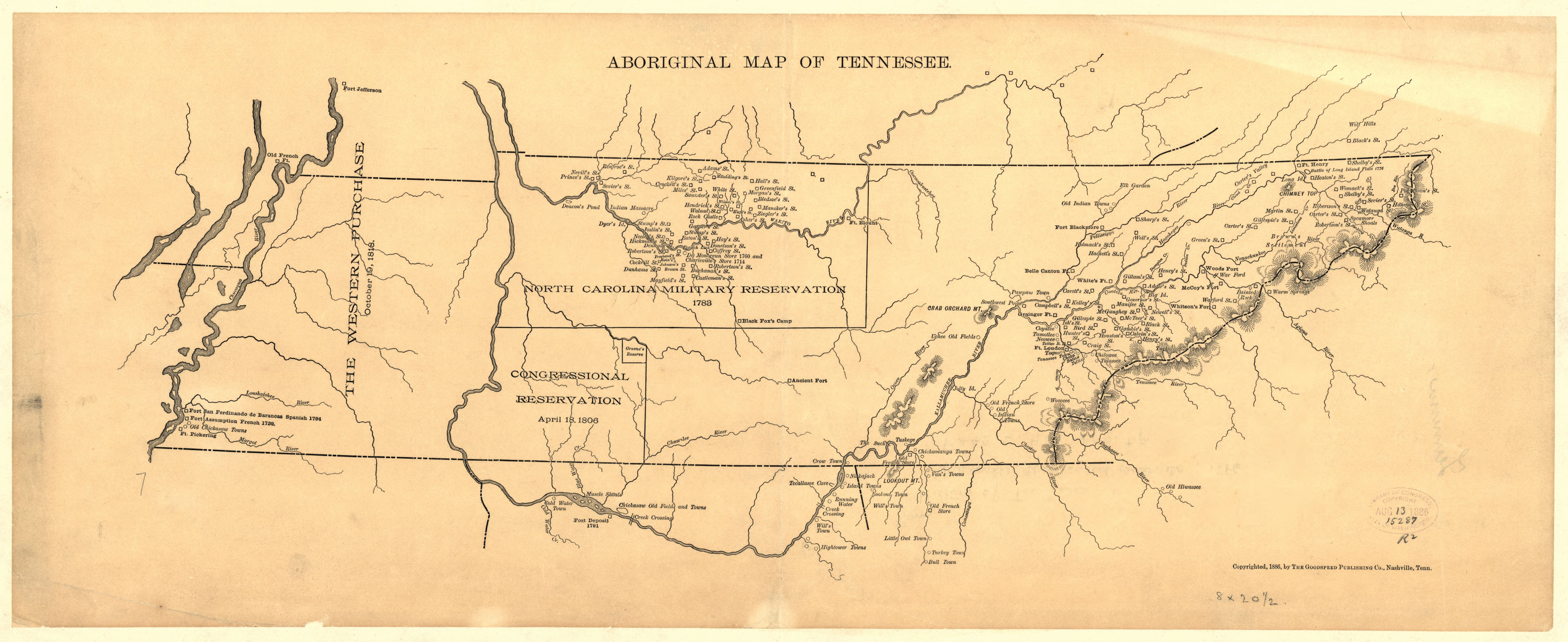
"Aboriginal map of Tennessee" showing the Chickamauga towns (LOC 2006626014)

Following the colonial militias' counterattacks—including Rutherford's Campaign in North Carolina—in late summer and fall 1776—which destroyed the Cherokee Middle, Valley, and Lower Towns in Tennessee and the Carolinas—his father and Oconostota sued for peace. Opposing his father's counsel and refusing to admit defeat, Dragging Canoe led a band of about 500 Overhill Cherokee out of the towns, and they settled further south. This occurred in early 1777. The group migrated along the Tennessee River to the area seven miles upstream from where the South Chickamauga Creek joins the Tennessee, in the vicinity of present-day Chattanooga. Thereafter, frontiersman referred to them as the "Chickamauga" because of their settlement by the creek. They established 11 towns, including one later referred to as "Old Chickamauga Town." This was across the river from the trading post of a Scotsman—who was the assistant superintendent of the British concerns in the region—John McDonald. McDonald regularly supplied the Chickamauga with guns, cannons, ammunition, and supplies to fight the American colonists.

In spring of 1779, American pioneer Evan Shelby led an expedition of frontiersmen from Virginia and North Carolina to destroy Dragging Canoe's Chickamauga towns. Shelby reported their success in a letter to Patrick Henry, saying "...[ the Chickamauga Cherokee ] are reduced to a Sense of their Duty and a Willingness to treat for peace with the united States..."

In 1782, for the second time since the wars' beginning, Cherokee towns were specifically attacked by a large United States force. The devastation caused by Colonel John Sevier's troop forced the band to move even further down the Tennessee River. Dragging Canoe established the "Five Lower Towns" (Note: The Five Lower Towns and their satellite settlements were mostly in areas of far northwest Georgia and what later became Alabama.) below the natural obstructions of the Tennessee River Gorge. These were: Running Water Town (now Whiteside), Nickajack Town (near the cave of the same name), Long Island (on the Tennessee River), Crow Town (at the mouth of Crow Creek), and Lookout Mountain Town (at the current site of Trenton, Georgia). Following this move, this band was alternatively referred to as the "Lower Cherokee."

From his base at Running Water Town, Dragging Canoe led attacks on white settlements all over the American Southeast, especially against American colonists on the Holston, Watauga, and Nolichucky rivers in eastern Tennessee. After 1780, he also attacked settlements in the Cumberland River area, the Mero and Washington Districts, the Republic of Franklin, the Middle Tennessee areas, and raided into Kentucky and Virginia as well. His three brothers, Little Owl, the Badger, and Turtle-at-Home, often fought with his forces.

=== Death ===
Dragging Canoe died February 29, 1792, at Running Water Town, from exhaustion (or possibly a heart attack) after dancing all night celebrating the recent conclusion of an alliance with the Muskogee and the Choctaw. The Chickamauga were also celebrating a recent victory by one of their war bands against the Cumberland settlements. He was succeeded as chief by John Watts.

== Legacy ==
Historians such as John P. Brown in Old Frontiers, and James Mooney in his early ethnographic book, Myths of the Cherokee, consider him a role model for the younger Tecumseh, who was a member of a band of Shawnee people living with the Chickamauga and taking part in their wars.

== See also ==
- Historic Cherokee settlements

== Bibliography ==
- Alderman, Pat. Dragging Canoe: Cherokee-Chickamauga War Chief, (Johnson City: Overmountain Press, 1978)
- Brown, John P. Old Frontiers: The Story of the Cherokee Indians from Earliest Times to the Date of Their Removal to the West, 1838, (Kingsport: Southern Publishers, 1938).
- Evans, E. Raymond. "Notable Persons in Cherokee History: Dragging Canoe," Journal of Cherokee Studies, Vol. 2, No. 2, pp. 176–189. Cherokee: Museum of the Cherokee Indian,
- Haywood, W.H. The Civil and Political History of the State of Tennessee from its Earliest Settlement up to the Year 1796, (Nashville: Methodist Episcopal Publishing House, 1891).
- Klink, Karl, and James Talman, ed. The Journal of Major John Norton, (Toronto: Champlain Society, 1970).
- McLoughlin, William G., Cherokee Renascence in the New Republic. (Princeton: Princeton University Press, 1992).
- Mooney, James. Myths of the Cherokee and Sacred Formulas of the Cherokee. (Nashville: Charles and Randy Elder-Booksellers, 1982).
- Moore, John Trotwood and Austin P. Foster. Tennessee, The Volunteer State, 1769–1923, Vol. 1. (Chicago: S. J. Clarke Publishing Co., 1923).
- Ramsey, J. G. M., The Annals of Tennessee to the End of the Eighteenth Century, 1853 (2007 Online Edition). (Rockwood, TN: RoaneTNHistory.org, 2007).
