= Battle of Island Flats =

Cherokee–American battle in Tennessee

Battle of Island Flats also: Battle of Eaton's Station Battle at Long Island of the Holston
- Part of Cherokee–American wars and the American Revolutionary War
Date	July 20, 1776; 250 years ago
Location	Long Island of the Holston 36°32′N 82°33′W
Result	American victory

Belligerents
United States	Cherokee tribes

Commanders and leaders
William Cocke; James Thompson; John Campbell; James Shelby; William Buchanan; Thomas Madison	Dragging Canoe; The Raven; Old Abraham

Strength
About 160	About 190

Casualties and losses
4 killed	13 killed

The Battle of Island Flats (Note: Also, the "Battle of Long Island Flats", first "Battle of Eaton's Station") (also the Battle at Long Island of the Holston) was the opening battle of the American War of Independence in the west. The battle was fought in July 1776, and pitted the American regional Patriot militia against the British allied Cherokee forces in the Overmountain region of the American frontier.

== War ==
In mid-July, Dragging Canoe, Oconostota, and The Raven led a surprise attack on the Overmountain settlements of Eaton's station, Fort Watauga, and Carter's Valley, respectively. The purpose of the coordinated, three-pronged attacks were to drive the settlers of the Washington District back over the Appalachian Mountains. The attacks were made with the knowledge that the British allies of the Cherokee would be escalating their war against the American rebels following their recent Declaration of Independence. The Cherokee were going to war.

== Eaton's station ==
Warned ahead of time of the coming assault by messengers sent from Cherokee diplomat Nancy Ward, the areas' militia members, most of whom were battle hardened and experienced from the recent Dunmore's War, were mustered to Eaton's station, (Note: Named for its founder, Amos Eaton, however, through history it is often referred to as "Heaton's station". Eaton created another stockaded way-station in the Cumberland settlements area that also bears the name when he removed to the vicinity of Fort Nashborough in the early 1780s.) situated on the ridge just east of Long Island. Under Majors James Thompson (Note: James Thompson had a plantation established on Long Island of the Holston, adjacent to the battle site.) and William Cocke, they readied Eaton's station for battle. Along with a small garrison of soldiers that had been stationed in the area, they rapidly fortified the simple way-station and constructed a stockade fence of logs and rails around it. Then the frontiersmen waited for the arrival of the war party.

== Battle ==
Both of the opposing forces comprised less than 200 men each: about 170 for the frontiersmen, and approximately 190 for the Indians. The Native American raiders were following Cherokee war chiefs, Oconostota, Dragging Canoe (Tsiyu Gansini) and The Raven (Savanukah), all of whom were skilled and experienced warriors. They started their campaign against the settlers on July 20, 1776. Because of the lack of surprise that they counted on, the Cherokees were quickly routed, and they withdrew after suffering at least 14 fatalities (nearly one-twelfth of their entire force). The Indians also suffered several lesser casualties—including a badly wounded Dragging Canoe. The station defenders suffered four casualties.

After being beaten back by the frontiersmen, Cherokee raiding parties continued attacks against the isolated settlements in the region. State and frontier militias retaliated, destroying Native villages and crops, such as seen in the Rutherford Light Horse expedition.

== See also ==
- Cherokee–American wars
