= Pleasant Moorman Miller =

American politician

Member of the U.S. House of Representatives from Tennessee's 3rd district
- In office March 4, 1809 – March 3, 1811
- Preceded by: Jesse Wharton
- Succeeded by: Felix Grundy

Member of the Tennessee House of Representatives
- In office 1811-1812; 1817-1823

Personal details
- Born: Lynchburg, Virginia
- Died: 1849 Trenton, Tennessee
- Party: Democratic-Republican
- Spouse: Mary Louisa Blount Miller
- Profession: lawyer; politician

Pleasant Moorman Miller, (unknown birth - 1849) was an American politician who represented Tennessee in the United States House of Representatives.

== Biography ==
Miller was born the son of a tavern owner in Lynchburg, Virginia. Miller studied law under Judge Archibald Stewart of Staunton before moving to Rogersville, Tennessee, in 1796. Following his move from Rogersville to Knoxville in 1800, where he practiced law with Thomas Emmerson, Miller was married to Mary Louisa Blount, daughter of Tennessee statesman William Blount. He became known as one of the best criminal trial lawyers in Tennessee because of his wit and oratorical skills.

== Career ==
Elected chairman, Miller served as one of the commissioners for the government of Knoxville in 1801 and 1802. He was a leader of the Blount-Jackson political faction, and elected as a Democratic-Republican to the Eleventh Congress, which lasted from March 4, 1809 to March 4, 1811. He moved to west Tennessee in approximately 1824 and was chancellor of that division in 1836 and 1837.

In 1811 Miller was elected to the Tennessee House of Representatives and helped secure the creation of the Bank of the State of Tennessee. He resigned in 1812 to serve in the first Seminole War and enlisted again in 1814 in the Creek Indian War.

Again elected to the Tennessee House from 1817 to 1823, he emerged as a champion of squatter rights, helped secure passage of legislation stabilizing Tennessee banks and currency during the Depression of 1819, and sponsored major judicial reform. In 1822 he introduced the resolution nominating Andrew Jackson for the presidency.

To manage his extensive land holdings and law practice, Miller moved to Jackson; became a tireless organizer of the Whig Party, and was elected by the legislature as the first chancellor of West Tennessee in 1836, he served until resigning in 1837 in order to campaign for Whig candidates.

== Death ==
In 1847 Miller moved to Trenton in Gibson County, where he died in 1849, and is interred at Trenton, Tennessee

U.S. House of Representatives
| Preceded by Jesse Wharton | Member of the U.S. House of Representatives from Tennessee's 3rd congressional district 1809-1811 | Succeeded by Felix Grundy |
