= Thomas Emmerson =

American judge

Mayor of Knoxville, Tennessee
- In office 1816–1817
- Preceded by: (none)
- Succeeded by: James Park

Personal details
- Born: June 23, 1773 Lawrenceville, Colony of Virginia
- Died: July 22, 1837 (aged 64) Jonesborough, Tennessee, U.S.
- Resting place: Old Cemetery, Jonesborough, Tennessee
- Spouse(s): Rachel Burwell (1795–1832, her death); Catherine Jacobs (m. 1833)
- Education: William & Mary College
- Profession: Attorney

Thomas Emmerson (June 23, 1773 – July 22, 1837) was an American judge and newspaper editor, active in the early 19th century. He was a justice of the Tennessee Superior Court of Law and Equity (1807) and the Tennessee Court of Errors and Appeals (1819–1822), both of which were predecessors of the Tennessee Supreme Court, and served as the first Mayor of Knoxville, Tennessee (1816–1817). In his later years, he moved to Jonesborough, where he published an influential newsletter, The Washington Republican and Farmer's Journal.

== Early life and legal career ==
Emmerson was born in Lawrenceville, Virginia, the eldest child of Arthur Emmerson, an Episcopal clergyman, and Anne (Tazewell) Emmerson. He was educated at William & Mary College before moving to Knoxville, Tennessee, in 1800. In 1807, he was appointed by Governor John Sevier to the Tennessee Superior Court of Law and Equity, at the time the state's highest court, but resigned later that year.

In 1807, Emmerson was appointed to the Board of Trustees of East Tennessee College (the forerunner of the modern University of Tennessee), and served as the Board's secretary from 1812 to 1820. In 1811, he was appointed to the inaugural Board of Trustees of the Knoxville Female Academy. That same year, he was appointed to a commission charged with establishing the Bank of Knoxville, and later became the bank's director.

Knoxville was incorporated as a city on October 27, 1815. To govern the city, the charter called for the election of a Board of Aldermen, who would then choose from one of their own the city's mayor (the law was changed in 1839 to allow popular mayoral elections). Emmerson was elected to the city's inaugural Board of Aldermen, and was elevated to mayor by his fellow aldermen on January 13, 1816. The Emmerson-led Board established tax rates, created licenses for merchants and bars, appointed tax assessors, and arranged for the construction of a market house on Main Street (later moved to Market Square).

Following his resignation from the court in 1807, Emmerson formed a law partnership with Pleasant M. Miller. In 1818, Emmerson and Judge John Overton published a two-volume collection of state supreme court decisions entitled, Tennessee Reports. In 1819, Governor Joseph McMinn appointed Emmerson to the Tennessee Supreme Court of Errors and Appeals, which had succeeded the Court of Law and Equity as the state's highest court. Emmerson served on this court until 1822.

== Publishing career ==
Following his retirement from the court, Emmerson moved to Jonesborough, Tennessee, where he practiced law and purchased a farm just outside the city on Cherokee Creek. He quickly developed a fascination with experimental farming practices, and helped introduce the first cast iron plow to the region in 1825. In the early 1830s, Emmerson was president of the American Colonization Society's Washington County chapter.

In 1833, Emmerson purchased The Farmer's Journal, a newspaper that had been established in 1825 by Jonesborough printer Jacob Howard (Howard is perhaps better known for printing two abolitionist newspapers, The Emancipator and the Manumission Intelligencer). Emmerson renamed the paper, The Washington Republican and Farmer's Journal, which he initially published in partnership with Seth W.J. Lucky and Lawson Gifford. With the motto, "Truth our guide, the public good our aim," the paper supported railroad construction and internal improvements, and was politically anti-Jackson. Within a few months, Lucky left the partnership, and Gifford left in 1835 to establish the Tennessee Sentinel.

In December 1834, Emmerson launched a 16-page monthly newsletter entitled, The Tennessee Farmer. In the paper's prospectus, Emmerson states its purpose as "the diffusion of agricultural information," with a smaller portion devoted to news regarding internal improvements and other issues of interest to farmers, and short articles seeking to "improve the morals of the rising generation."

In early 1837, Emmerson sold the Washington Republican to Jonesborough publisher Mason R. Lyon. He died on July 22 of that year, and was buried in Jonesborough's Old Cemetery.

== Family and legacy ==
Emmerson married Rachel Burwell in 1795, and they had six children. In 1833, after his first wife's death, he married Catherine Jacobs. Following his death, his second wife ran a subscription-based school in Jonesborough for several years. The couple's house still stands on Woodrow Avenue in Jonesborough, and is part of the Jonesborough Historic District.

Governor William G. "Parson" Brownlow (1805–1877) began his journalism career by publishing several anonymous articles in Emmerson's Washington Republican. Impressed, Emmerson encouraged Brownlow to enter the newspaper field. In 1839, Brownlow launched the Whig, which would become one of the most influential newspapers in Tennessee, and would bring Brownlow national fame and notoriety. For several years, Brownlow published the paper in partnership with Emmerson's successor, Mason R. Lyon. In the 1840s, Brownlow frequently clashed with Landon Carter Haynes, editor of the Tennessee Sentinel, the paper that had been founded by Emmerson's associate, Lawson Gifford.
