= Jesse Wharton =

American politician (1782–1833)

United States Senator from Tennessee
- In office March 17, 1814 – October 10, 1815
- Appointed by: Willie Blount
- Preceded by: George W. Campbell
- Succeeded by: John Williams

Member of the U.S. House of Representatives from Tennessee's 3rd district
- In office March 4, 1807 – March 3, 1809
- Preceded by: William Dickson
- Succeeded by: Pleasant Moorman Miller

Personal details
- Born: July 29, 1782 Covesville, Virginia
- Died: July 22, 1833 (aged 50) Nashville, Tennessee
- Party: Democratic-Republican
- Spouses: Mary "Polly" Philips Wharton; Elizabeth Auston Rice Wharton
- Children: John Overton Wharton; Joseph Philips Wharton; Rhoda Ann Wharton; Sarah Angelina Wharton; Mary Philips Wharton; Elizabeth Jane Wharton; Francis Alexander Ramsey Wharton; Thomas Jesse Wharton; Fedelia Wharton

Jesse Wharton (July 29, 1782 – July 22, 1833) was an attorney who briefly represented Tennessee in both houses of the United States Congress.

== Biography ==
Wharton was born in Covesville, Albemarle County, Virginia; studied law at Dickinson College, was admitted to the Virginia bar, and practiced in Albemarle County. He married Mary Philips (6 September 1786 – 11 April 1813), the daughter of Joseph Philips Jr. and Milberry Horn, on April 20, 1804, in Davidson County, Tennessee. They had five children: John Overton, Joseph Philips, Rhoda Ann, Sarah Angelina, and Mary Philips. Mary died at the age of 26. Wharton also had five children with his second wife, his cousin, Elizabeth Auston Rice, of Virginia.

== Career ==
After moving to Tennessee, Wharton was elected as a Democratic Republican to the Tenth Congress as Representative in the United States House of Representatives, and served from March 4, 1807, to March 3, 1809. He was appointed to the United States Senate to fill the vacancy caused by the resignation of George W. Campbell and served from March 17, 1814, to October 10, 1815, when a successor was elected. He then returned to his law practice. In 1832 he was named to the Board of Visitors of the United States Military Academy.

== Death ==
Wharton died in Nashville, Tennessee, on July 22, 1833, one week before his fifty first birthday. He is interred at Mount Olivet Cemetery. His grandson, Wharton Jackson Green was a U.S. Congressman from North Carolina.

U.S. House of Representatives
| Preceded by William Dickson | U.S. Representative from Tennessee's 3rd congressional district 1807–1809 | Succeeded by Pleasant Moorman Miller |
U.S. Senate
| Preceded by George W. Campbell | U.S. senator (Class 2) from Tennessee; 1814–1815; Served alongside: Joseph Anderson, George W. Campbell | Succeeded by John Williams |
