= Jenkin Whiteside =

American politician (1772–1822)

United States Senator from Tennessee
- In office April 11, 1809 – October 8, 1811
- Preceded by: Daniel Smith (Tennessee politician)
- Succeeded by: George W. Campbell

Personal details
- Born: 1772 Lancaster, Pennsylvania, British America
- Died: September 25, 1822 (aged 49–50) Nashville, Tennessee, United States
- Party: Democratic-Republican

Jenkin Whiteside (1772 – September 25, 1822) was an attorney who served as a United States Senator from Tennessee.

== Biography ==
Jenkin Whiteside was born in Lancaster, Pennsylvania. His father, Thomas Whiteside (1742–1823), was born in County Tyrone in Ulster and settled in the Province of Pennsylvania. Jenkin Whiteside studied the law in Pennsylvania and was admitted to the bar there. Moving to Knoxville, Tennessee, he commenced practice there, and in 1801 and 1802 served as a Knoxville commissioner.

In 1809, he was elected by the Tennessee General Assembly to replace Daniel Smith, who had resigned from the United States Senate, serving until his own resignation on October 8, 1811, when he resumed the practice of law.

He was succeeded as senator by George W. Campbell.

== Death ==
He died in Nashville in 1821 and was buried in Columbia, Tennessee.

U.S. Senate
Preceded by Daniel Smith	U.S. senator (Class 2) from Tennessee; 1809–1811; Served alongside: Joseph Anderson	Succeeded by George W. Campbell
