= Daniel Smith (Tennessee politician) =

American politician

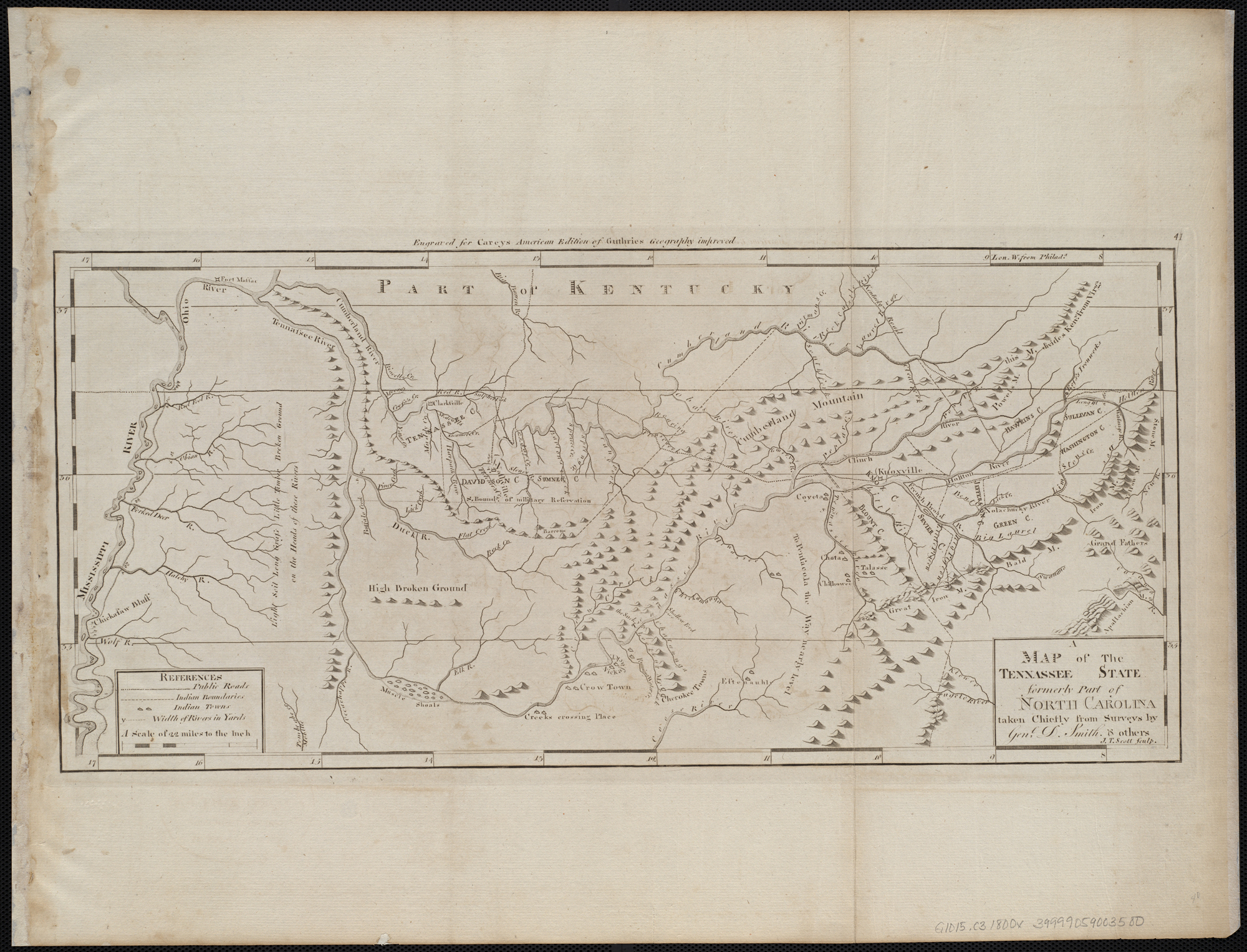
- "A map of the Tennassee state formerly part of North Carolina taken chiefly from surveys by Genl. D. Smith and others," by Mathew Carey (1800)

United States Senator from Tennessee
- In office October 6, 1798 – March 3, 1799
- Appointed by: John Sevier
- Preceded by: Andrew Jackson
- Succeeded by: Joseph Anderson
- In office March 4, 1805 – March 31, 1809
- Preceded by: William Cocke
- Succeeded by: Jenkin Whiteside

Secretary of the Southwest Territory
- In office 1790–1796
- Preceded by: (none)
- Succeeded by: (none)

Personal details
- Born: October 29, 1748 Stafford County, Virginia, British America. (Present day United States)
- Died: June 16, 1818 (aged 69) Hendersonville, Tennessee, United States
- Party: Democratic-Republican

Daniel Smith (October 29, 1748 – June 16, 1818) was a surveyor, an American Revolutionary War patriot, and twice a United States Senator from Tennessee.

== Biography ==
Daniel Smith was born October 29, 1748, in Stafford County, Virginia, the son of Henry Smith and Sarah Ann Crosby. He attended the College of William & Mary in Williamsburg, Virginia. Becoming a surveyor, he moved to Augusta County, Virginia, serving as deputy surveyor of the county in 1773. He owned slaves. In Washington, Virginia on June 10 of that same year he married Sarah Michie (30 Jan 1755 – 2 Apr 1831). She was daughter of George and Elizabeth (Michie) Michie.

As a militia officer, he helped defend the Virginia frontier during Dunmore's War and the American Revolution. He became sheriff of Augusta County in 1780 and was commissioned a colonel in the militia, taking part in the later battles of the Revolutionary War, including Guilford Courthouse and Kings Mountain. On October 5, 1781, Smith was appointed "Assistant Deputy Surveyor" in the Southern Department of the Continental Army under Thomas Hutchins.

At the war's end, Smith moved to what is now Sumner County, Tennessee, to claim the land grant for his military service. As county surveyor, he surveyed what became the site of the town of Nashville, Tennessee. He was prominent in local affairs and was appointed a brigadier general in the militia. He was a member of the 1789 North Carolina convention which voted to ratify the United States Constitution. In 1790, President George Washington named him Secretary (chief deputy) of the Southwest Territory. Smith was a member of the convention that wrote the Tennessee State Constitution of 1796, which came into effect with its statehood on June 1, 1796. The first official map of Tennessee, drawn by Hugh Williamson and published by Mathew Carey in 1793, credited "surveys by Gen'l D. Smith and others" as sources.

Smith was later appointed as United States Senator when Andrew Jackson resigned from that position (for the first time), serving from October 6, 1798, to March 3, 1799.

In January 1805 he was a signatory to a petition protesting the court-martial of Thomas Butler, probably produced at the behest of Andrew Jackson and sent to Thomas Jefferson's government, recorded in official state papers under the title "Disobedience of Orders Justified on the Grounds of Illegality." He was later elected to his own Senate term, serving from March 4, 1805, to March 31, 1809, when he resigned and returned to his Sumner County estate, Rock Castle in Hendersonville, pursuing his agricultural and business interests until his death there, being interred in an adjacent family plot.

Rock Castle State Historic Site is preserved today as an historical landmark and one of the early examples in Middle Tennessee of a plantation.

U.S. Senate
Preceded by Andrew Jackson	U.S. senator (Class 1) from Tennessee; 1798–1799; Served alongside: Joseph Anderson	Succeeded by Joseph Anderson
Preceded by William Cocke	U.S. senator (Class 2) from Tennessee; 1805–1809; Served alongside: Joseph Anderson	Succeeded by Jenkin Whiteside
