= Joseph Anderson (Tennessee politician) =

American politician

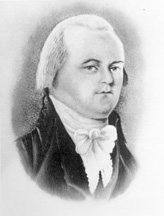

President pro tempore of the United States Senate
- In office January 15, 1805 – December 1, 1805
- Preceded by: Jesse Franklin
- Succeeded by: Samuel Smith

United States Senator from Tennessee
- In office March 4, 1799 – March 3, 1815
- Preceded by: Daniel Smith
- Succeeded by: George W. Campbell
- In office September 26, 1797 – March 3, 1799
- Preceded by: William Blount
- Succeeded by: William Cocke

Territorial Judge of the Tennessee Territorial High Court
- In office 1791–1796
- Appointed by: George Washington
- Preceded by: Position Established

Personal details
- Born: Joseph Inslee Anderson; November 5, 1757 Philadelphia, Pennsylvania
- Died: April 17, 1837 (aged 79) Washington, D.C.
- Resting place: Congressional Cemetery; Washington, D.C.
- Party: Democratic-Republican
- Spouse: Patience Outlaw
- Children: William, Alexander, Pierce, Thomas, Addison, George, James
- Profession: Attorney

Joseph Inslee Anderson (November 5, 1757 – April 17, 1837) was an American soldier, judge, and politician, who served as a United States Senator from Tennessee from 1797 to 1815, and later as the First Comptroller of the United States Treasury. He also served as one of three judges of the Southwest Territory in the 1790s, and was a delegate to the Tennessee state constitutional convention in 1796.

From January to December 1805, Anderson served as President pro tempore of the United States.

== Biography ==
=== Early life ===
Anderson was born at White Marsh, near Philadelphia, Pennsylvania, the son of William Anderson and Elizabeth Inslee. He acquired a good education and studied law. In 1776, following the outbreak of the American Revolutionary War, he enlisted in the 3rd New Jersey Regiment of the Continental Army, and rose to the rank of captain and paymaster in less than two years. Anderson fought at the Battle of Monmouth, and was with the army during its difficult 1777 wintering at Valley Forge. In 1781, he transferred to the 1st New Jersey Regiment, and fought with this unit at the Battle of Yorktown.

At the end of the war, Anderson was discharged with the rank of major. Having studied law before the war, he was admitted to the Delaware bar, and practiced law in Delaware from 1784 to 1791. He owned slaves.

Anderson was a Freemason. He was a member of Military Lodge No. 19 of Pennsylvania and became a member of Lodge No. 36 while in the New Jersey Brigade. After the war, he was the first Senior Warden of Princeton Lodge No. 38 in Princeton, New Jersey.

=== Early Tennessee politics ===
In 1791, President George Washington appointed Anderson United States judge of the newly formed Southwest Territory. He served alongside David Campbell and John McNairy. No records of any of the trials presided over by Anderson survive, with the exception of a 1794 murder trial. This trial, conducted at the Tellico Blockhouse, concerned an Indian charged with killing settler Joseph Ish.

In 1792, Anderson married Only Patience Outlaw, the daughter of Tennessee pioneer Alexander Outlaw. His wife's dowry included land along the Nolichucky River in what is now Hamblen County (but was then a part of Jefferson), where the Andersons built their home, Soldier's Rest.

In 1796, Anderson and his father-in-law represented Jefferson County at Tennessee's constitutional convention in Knoxville. Resolutions introduced by Anderson and Outlaw included a motion to sever ties with the United States if Tennessee's petition for statehood was rejected, a motion to implement viva voce voting instead of balloting, and a motion to establish a unicameral legislature, all of which were rejected. Anderson swore in the new state's first legislature later that year.

=== United States Senate ===
In 1797, Anderson was elected by the Tennessee General Assembly to fill the vacancy in the Senate created by that body's expulsion of the seat's original occupant, William Blount. That term was scheduled to expire on March 3, 1799; however, on December 12, 1798, the Tennessee General Assembly elected Anderson to the state's other (Class 1) Senate seat, which had been vacated by Andrew Jackson, and was temporarily held by Daniel Smith. Anderson was re-elected to this seat in 1803, and again in 1809. In the latter election, he defeated retiring governor John Sevier by a vote of 23 to 16.

Anderson voted against a Senate proposal to have Blount arrested in 1797. He opposed the Alien and Sedition Acts, federal intervention into the issue of slavery, the rechartering of the national bank, and the usage of military force in the Quasi-War. He voted in favor of the War of 1812. In the Eighth Congress (1803–1804), he served as the Senate's president pro tempore.

=== Later life ===
After retiring from the Senate, Anderson was appointed Comptroller of the U.S. Treasury by President James Madison, and served in that office from 1815 until 1836. He died in Washington on April 17, 1837, and was interred in the Congressional Cemetery.

== Legacy ==
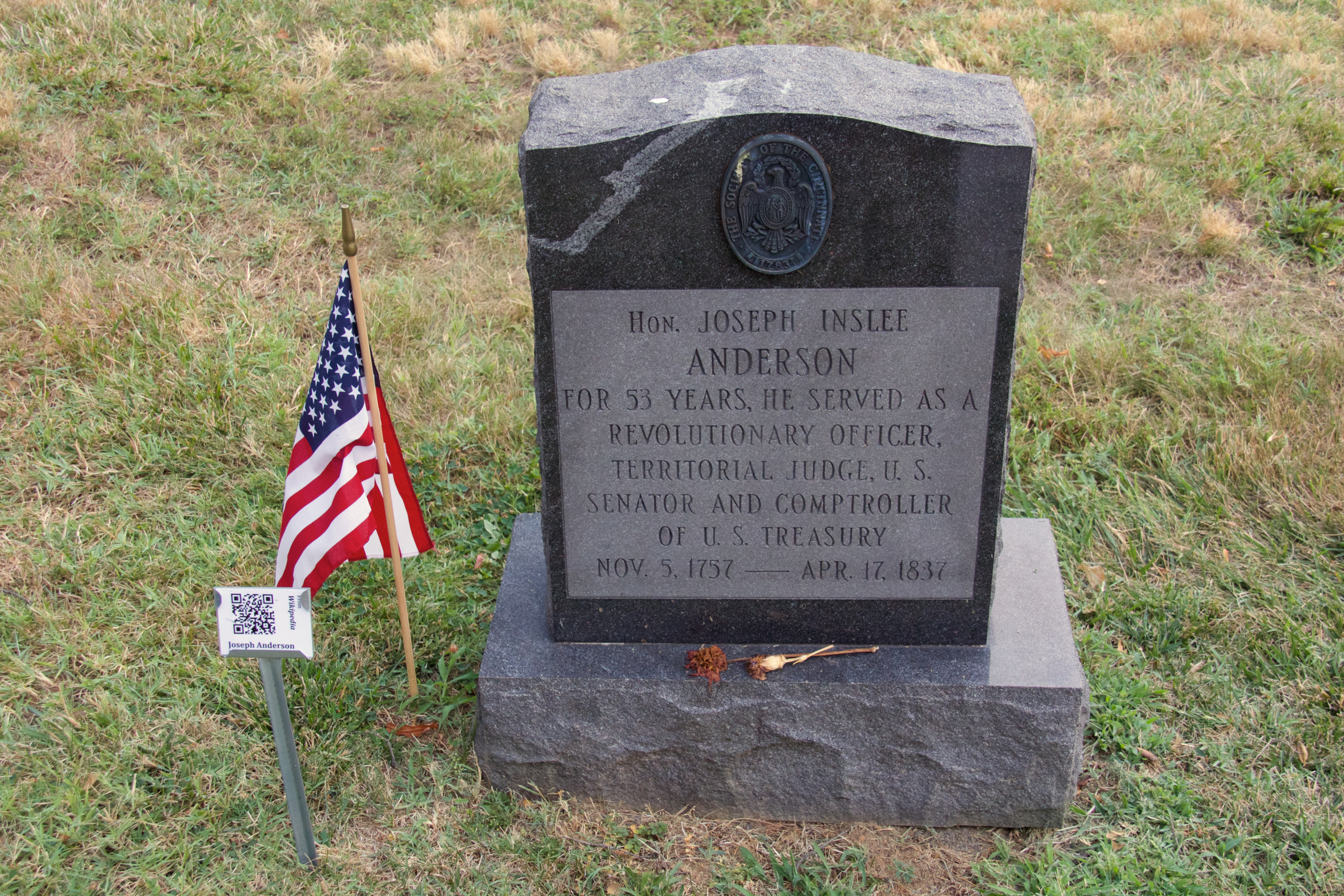
Anderson's grave.

Anderson's son, Alexander Outlaw Anderson, served as a U.S. Senator from Tennessee from 1840 to 1841, and helped organize the government of the State of California in the early 1850s. Another son, William, served in the state legislature, and a nephew, James W. Deaderick, served as a justice of the Tennessee Supreme Court. Anderson County, Tennessee, is named for Joseph Anderson, as well as Andersonville.

Political offices
Preceded by Jesse Franklin	President pro tempore of the United States Senate; January 15, 1805 – December 1, 1805	Succeeded by Samuel Smith
U.S. Senate
Preceded by William Blount	U.S. senator (Class 2) from Tennessee; 1797–1799; Served alongside: Andrew Jackson, Daniel Smith	Succeeded by William Cocke
Preceded by Daniel Smith	U.S. senator (Class 1) from Tennessee; 1799–1815; Served alongside: William Cocke, Daniel Smith, Jenkin Whiteside, Jesse Wharton	Succeeded by George W. Campbell
