= George W. Campbell =

American judge and statesman (1769–1848)

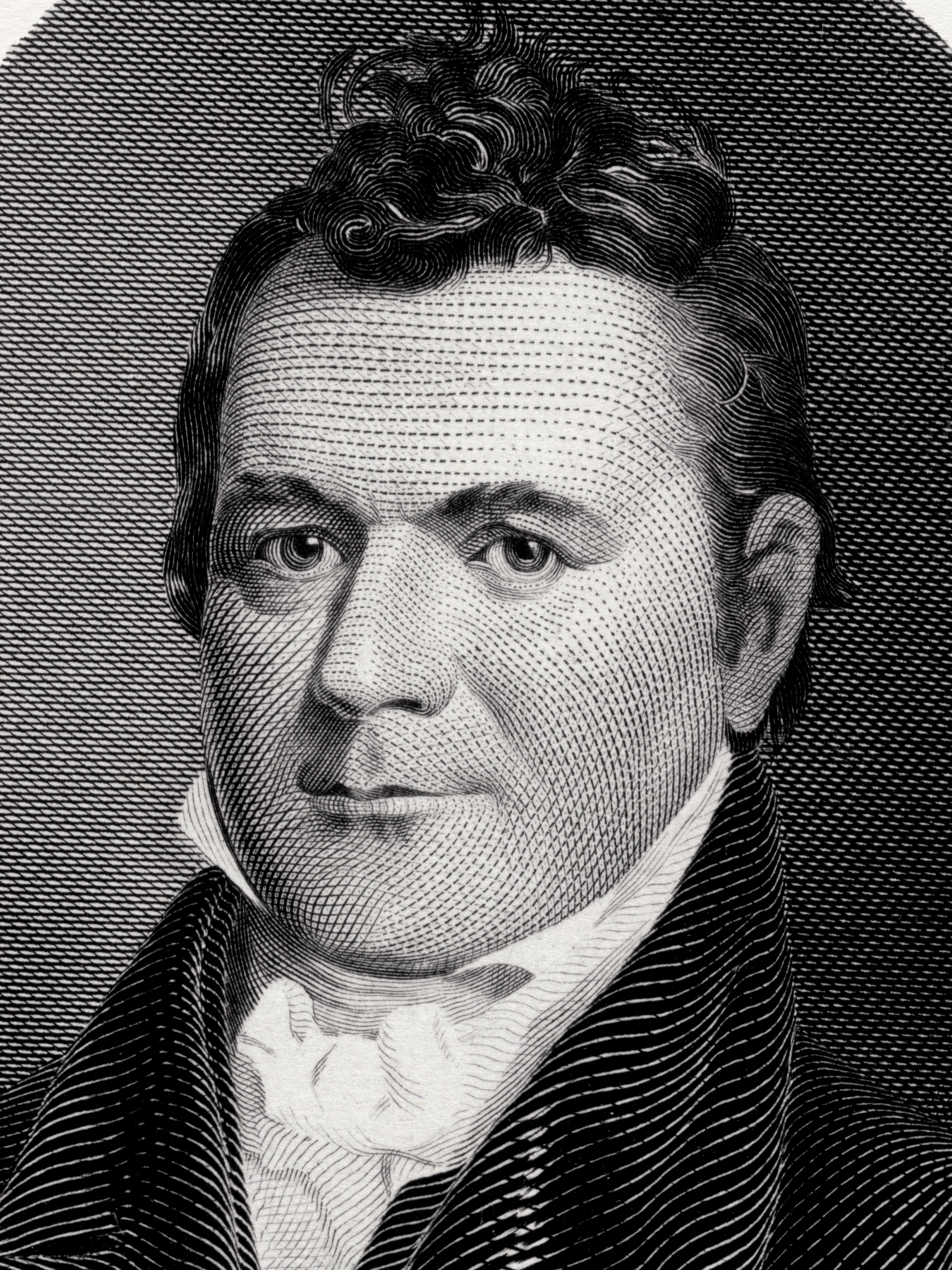

4th United States Minister to Russia
- In office February 7, 1819 – July 8, 1820
- President: James Monroe
- Preceded by: William Pinkney
- Succeeded by: Henry Middleton

United States Senator from Tennessee
- In office October 10, 1815 – April 20, 1818
- Preceded by: Joseph Anderson
- Succeeded by: John Eaton
- In office October 8, 1811 – February 11, 1814
- Preceded by: Jenkin Whiteside
- Succeeded by: Jesse Wharton

5th United States Secretary of the Treasury
- In office February 9, 1814 – October 5, 1814
- President: James Madison
- Preceded by: William Jones (Acting)
- Succeeded by: Alexander J. Dallas

Associate Justice of the Tennessee Supreme Court
- In office 1809–1811

Member of the U.S. House of Representatives from Tennessee's 2nd district
- In office March 4, 1805 – March 3, 1809
- Preceded by: Constituency established
- Succeeded by: Robert Weakley

Member of the U.S. House of Representatives from Tennessee's at-large district
- In office March 4, 1803 – March 3, 1805
- Preceded by: Constituency established
- Succeeded by: Constituency abolished

Personal details
- Born: George Washington Campbell; February 9, 1769 Tongue, Sutherlandshire, Scotland, Kingdom of Great Britain
- Died: February 17, 1848 (aged 79) Nashville, Tennessee, U.S.
- Party: Democratic-Republican
- Spouse: Harriot Stoddert
- Education: Princeton University (BA)

George Washington Campbell (February 9, 1769 – February 17, 1848) was an American statesman who served as a U.S. representative, senator, Tennessee Supreme Court justice, U.S. ambassador to Russia and the 5th secretary of the treasury from February to October 1814.

== Biography ==
Born in the village of Tongue, Sutherland on the north coast of Scotland, Campbell immigrated as a young boy to North Carolina in 1772 with his parents. George was the youngest son of Dr. Archibald Campbell and Elizabeth Mackay Matheson Campbell, who settled on Crooked Creek in Mecklenburg County, North Carolina. After teaching school in his early 20's, he entered the junior class at the College of New Jersey (which is now Princeton University) in 1792. He graduated in 1794 and began studying law. He was admitted to the bar in North Carolina and began practicing in Knoxville, Tennessee in 1798. He owned slaves.

=== U.S. House ===
Campbell was elected to the United States House of Representatives as the Representative from Tennessee's at-large congressional district in 1803. He served in the House from 1805 to 1809, in the 8th, 9th, and 10th Congresses. During the 10th Congress, he was the chairman of the Ways and Means Committee. He was also one of the House managers appointed in 1804 to prosecute the case in the impeachment trial of John Pickering, judge of the United States District Court for the District of New Hampshire, and, later that year, he was also appointed a House manager for the impeachment trial of Samuel Chase, associate justice of the Supreme Court of the United States.

He left Congress in 1809 to become judge of the Tennessee Supreme Court, serving until 1811. On leaving Congress he moved his residence from Knoxville to Nashville, Tennessee. In July 1812 he married Harriet Stoddert (1788-1848) in Prince George's County, Maryland. Harriet was from a prominent Maryland family, the daughter of Benjamin Stoddert, the first Secretary of the United States Navy.

=== U.S. Senate and ambassadorship ===
Campbell served as a United States Senator from Tennessee twice, once from 1811 to 1814, having been elected to fill the seat of Jenkin Whiteside, and again from 1815 to 1818. His first service was from October 8, 1811, to February 11, 1814, when he resigned to accept appointment as the United States Secretary of the Treasury. He returned to the Senate on October 10, 1815. He served as the first chairman of the Senate Finance Committee and its predecessor from December 4, 1815, until his resignation from the Senate on April 20, 1818; on this occasion to accept appointment as United States Ambassador to Russia, a position he held from 1818 to 1821. Three of the couple's four young children died in April 1819, and Campbell wrote Secretary of State John Quincy Adams asking to be recalled and return home. He was not recalled, however, until 1820. Campbell served as a member of the French Spoliation Claims Commission in 1831.

=== Secretary of the Treasury ===
Appointed Secretary of the Treasury on his forty-fifth birthday by James Madison, Campbell faced national financial disorder brought on by the War of 1812. Congress had failed to recharter the First Bank of the United States after its charter expired in 1811, and appropriations for the war were unavailable, so Campbell had to convince Americans to buy government bonds. He was forced to meet lenders' terms, selling government bonds at exorbitant interest rates. In September 1814 the British occupied Washington, D.C., and the credit of the government was lowered even further. He was unsuccessful in his efforts to raise money through additional bond sales and he resigned that October after only eight months in office, disillusioned and in bad health.

Campbell died in 1848 and is buried at Nashville City Cemetery in Nashville, Tennessee.

== See also ==
- List of United States senators born outside the United States

U.S. House of Representatives
| New constituency | Member of the U.S. House of Representatives from Tennessee's at-large congressional district 1803–1805 | Constituency abolished |
| New constituency | Member of the U.S. House of Representatives from Tennessee's 2nd congressional district 1805–1809 | Succeeded by Robert Weakley |
| Preceded by Joseph Clay | Chair of the House Ways and Means Committee; 1807–1809 | Succeeded by John Eppes |
U.S. Senate
| Preceded by Jenkin Whiteside | United States Senator (Class 2) from Tennessee; 1811–1814; Served alongside: Joseph Anderson | Succeeded by Jesse Wharton |
| Preceded by Joseph Anderson | United States Senator (Class 1) from Tennessee; 1815–1818; Served alongside: Jesse Wharton, John Williams | Succeeded by John Eaton |
| New office | Chair of the Senate Finance Committee; 1815–1818 | Succeeded by John Eppes |
Political offices
| Preceded by Albert Gallatin | United States Secretary of the Treasury; 1814 | Succeeded by Alexander Dallas |
Diplomatic posts
| Preceded by William Pinkney | United States Minister to Russia; 1819–1820 | Succeeded by Henry Middleton |
