= William Dickson (Tennessee politician) =

American politician

Member of the U.S. House of Representatives from Tennessee's 3rd district
- In office March 4, 1805 – March 3, 1807
- Preceded by: District created
- Succeeded by: Jesse Wharton

Member of the U.S. House of Representatives from Tennessee's at-large district (seat A)
- In office March 4, 1803 – March 3, 1805
- Preceded by: District recreated
- Succeeded by: District eliminated

Member of the U.S. House of Representatives from Tennessee's 1st district
- In office March 4, 1801 – March 3, 1803
- Preceded by: William C. C. Claiborne
- Succeeded by: District eliminated

Speaker of the Tennessee House of Representatives
- In office 1799–1803
- Preceded by: James Stuart
- Succeeded by: James Stuart

Personal details
- Born: May 5, 1770 Duplin County, Province of North Carolina, British America
- Died: February 21, 1816 (aged 45) Nashville, Tennessee, U.S.
- Party: Democratic-Republican
- Spouses: Polly Gray Dickson; Susannah Hickman Dickson
- Children: Cornelia Ann Dickson; Indiana Dickson; Florida Dickson Baldwin; David Dickson
- Profession: Physician; Politician

William Dickson (May 5, 1770 – February 21, 1816) was an American politician who represented Tennessee in the United States House of Representatives 1801 to 1807.

== Biography ==
Dickson was born in Duplin County in the Province of North Carolina on May 5, 1770, and was educated at Grove Academy in Kenansville. With his parents, he moved to Nashville, Tennessee in 1795; studied medicine, then practiced as a physician. He married Polly Gray on August 19, 1802, in Nashville. They had three daughters and one son, Cornelia Ann Dickson, Indiana Dickson, Florida Dickson Baldwin and David Dickson. His second wife was Susannah Hickman. They had no children.

== Career ==
Dickson entered politics as a member of the Tennessee House of Representatives, serving as its speaker from 1799 to 1803.

Elected as a republican, Dickson served as a U.S. representative for Tennessee for the Seventh, Eighth, and Ninth Congresses from March 4, 1801, to March 3, 1807. He became a friend of President Andrew Jackson during that time. He was a trustee of the University of Nashville from 1806 to 1816.

== Death ==
Dickson died in Nashville on February 21, 1816 (age 45 years, 292 days). He is interred at a rural cemetery in Davidson County, Tennessee, near Nashville. Dickson County in Tennessee is named after him. A cousin of Molton Dickson, he was a member of the Freemasons.

U.S. House of Representatives
Preceded by William C. C. Claiborne	U.S. Representative from Tennessee; 1801–1807	Succeeded by Jesse Wharton
