= Cumberland Association =

The Cumberland Association was a legal governing body formed in 1780 to establish the efficient government of the early settlers along the Cumberland River in the area of what is now Nashville, Tennessee. The association was formed upon the signing of the Cumberland Compact. The Cumberland Association was officially recognized by the granting authority, the State of North Carolina, and it was not established in defiance of that authority.

Although formed in 1780, the Cumberland Association was dormant until 1783.

== Relationship with North Carolina ==
The Cumberland Association operated within the territory claimed and administered by the State of North Carolina. The settlement's inhabitants organized a local system of civil government to address the difficulties of administering justice and maintaining order in a geographically isolated frontier community.

== Cumberland Compact ==
The Cumberland Compact is central to understanding the Association. The Compact was drawn up by Richard Henderson in 1780 and signed by approximately 250 settlers. It established a basic constitutional framework for the settlement.
