= William Cocke =

American politician (1748–1828)

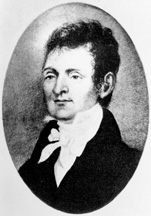

United States Senator from Tennessee
- In office March 4, 1799 – March 3, 1805
- Preceded by: Joseph Anderson
- Succeeded by: Daniel Smith
- In office August 2, 1796 – September 26, 1797
- Preceded by: Himself (Shadow Senator from the Southwest Territory)
- Succeeded by: Andrew Jackson

United States Shadow Senator from the Southwest Territory
- In office March 30, 1796 – August 2, 1796
- Preceded by: Seat established
- Succeeded by: Himself (U.S. Senator from Tennessee)

Member of the Mississippi House of Representatives
- In office 1813–1813

Personal details
- Born: 1748 Amelia County, Virginia, British America
- Died: August 22, 1828 (aged 79–80) Columbus, Mississippi, U.S.
- Party: Democratic-Republican

Military service
- Allegiance: United States
- Branch/service: North Carolina militia
- Years of service: c. 1776
- Battles/wars: American Revolutionary War: Battle of Island Flats

William Cocke (1748 – August 22, 1828) was an American lawyer, pioneer, and statesman. He has the distinction of having served in the state legislatures of four different states: Virginia, North Carolina, Tennessee, and Mississippi, and was one of the first two United States senators for Tennessee.

== Early life and education ==
Cocke was born in Amelia County, Virginia in 1748. He was of English descent. He was the sixth of ten or eleven children of Abraham (c.1695–1760) and Mary (Batte) Cocke. He was educated at home before reading law, and was admitted to the bar in Virginia. He owned four large plantations in Brunswick County, Virginia, operated with enslaved labor before Cocke moved to Tennessee. He owned slaves.

== Political career ==
Cocke was an elected member of the Virginia House of Burgesses. In 1776, as a colonel of militia, he led a company of men into North Carolina's Washington District for action against the Indians. Cocke suffered accusations of cowardice following his actions at the Battle of Island Flats that followed him throughout his life. Later that year, he left Virginia and moved to what was to become Tennessee. During the organization of the State of Franklin, Cocke was elected as the would-be state's delegate to the Congress of the Confederation.

In 1796, Cocke was chosen as a delegate to the convention that wrote the first Tennessee Constitution. The newly formed government selected Cocke to be one of the new state's initial senators, along with William Blount. Cocke and Blount presented their credentials to the United States Senate on May 9, 1796. The Senate, however, refused to seat Cocke and Blount while the debate regarding the admission of Tennessee into the Union was on. When Tennessee was finally admitted on June 1, the issue of Cocke and Blount's seating was again raised. The Federalist Senate held by a narrow margin (11–10) that Cocke and Blount's election was illegal because it had occurred without congressional authorization. The Tennessee legislature duly re-selected Cocke and Blount on August 2.

Cocke's initial term expired on March 3, 1797. The Tennessee General Assembly, however, neglected to elect a successor to Cocke; he was subsequently appointed to his former seat by Governor John Sevier on April 22, 1797, until the General Assembly belatedly elected his successor, Andrew Jackson. Later, he was elected by the Tennessee Assembly to the other U.S. Senate seat, and served from March 4, 1799, to March 3, 1805.

Cocke was appointed a judge of the First Circuit Court of Tennessee. On November 7, 1811, he was impeached by the Tennessee House of Representatives, and on October 10, 1812, at the end of his impeachment trial, he was convicted by the Tennessee Senate on one of the three articles of impeachment and thereby removed from office. In 1816 he was a witness to a treaty with the Chickasaw that was negotiated by Andrew Jackson and others.

== Personal life and family ==
Cocke engaged in a limited law practice, and spent more time on the frontier than he did in a law office. He was involved in exploration while in the company of Daniel Boone, traveling through much of what was to become eastern Kentucky and East Tennessee.

His son, John Alexander Cocke, was a four-term U.S. Representative from Tennessee; his grandson, William Michael Cocke, was a two-term U.S. Representative from Tennessee.

== Later life and death ==
Cocke was appointed a judge of the First Judicial Circuit of Tennessee in 1809. He later resigned this position and moved to Mississippi. There, he was elected to the state legislature in 1813. He briefly returned to military duty, serving under Andrew Jackson in the Creek War. In 1814, he was appointed by President James Madison to be an Indian agent to the Chickasaw nation.

Cocke died in Columbus, Lowndes County, Mississippi, in 1828 and is buried there, in Friendship Cemetery.

== Legacy ==
Cocke County, Tennessee is named in his honor.

== Notes ==
U.S. Senate
New seat	U.S. Shadow Senator (Class 1) from the Southwest Territory; 1796; Served alongside: William Blount	Succeeded by Himself as U.S. Senator from Tennessee
Preceded by Himself as Shadow Senator from the Southwest Territory	U.S. Senator (Class 1) from Tennessee; 1796–1797; Served alongside: William Blount	Succeeded by Andrew Jackson
Preceded by Joseph Anderson	U.S. Senator (Class 2) from Tennessee; 1799–1805; Served alongside: Joseph Anderson	Succeeded by Daniel Smith
