= 1810–11 United States House of Representatives elections =

House elections for the 12th U.S. Congress

- April 24, 1810 – August 2, 1811 (Note: Excludes states admitted during the 12th Congress.)

All 142 (Note: Includes late elections.) seats in the United States House of Representatives 72 seats needed for a majority
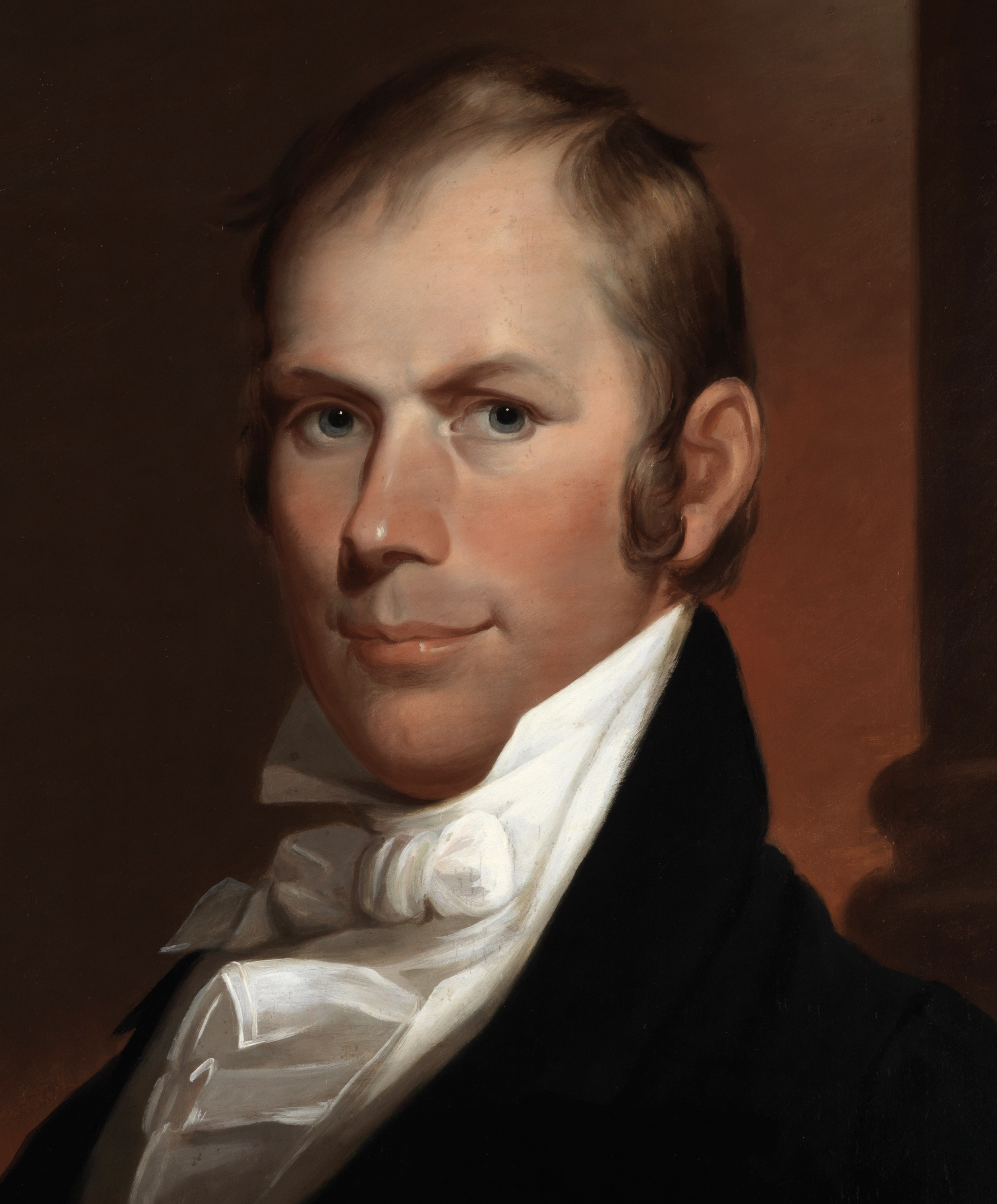

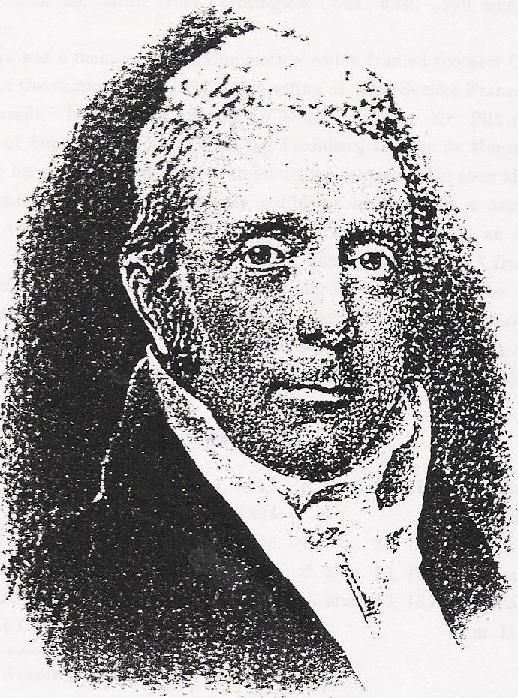
	Majority party	Minority party
Leader	Henry Clay	Timothy Pitkin
Party	Democratic-Republican	Federalist
Leader's seat	Kentucky 5th	Connecticut at-large
Last election	94 seats	48 seats
Seats won	107	36
Seat change	▲13	▼12
- Results: Federalist hold Federalist gain Democratic-Republican hold Democratic-Republican gain Dissident Republican hold Undistricted
Speaker before election
Joseph Bradley Varnum
Democratic-Republican
Elected Speaker
Henry Clay
Democratic-Republican

The 1810–11 United States House of Representatives elections were held on various dates in various states between April 24, 1810, and August 2, 1811. Each state set its own date for its elections to the House of Representatives before the first session of the 12th United States Congress convened on November 4, 1811. They occurred during President James Madison's first term. Elections were held for all 142 seats, representing 17 states.

One newly elected Representative, Henry Clay, also was elected Speaker.

With the repeal of the Embargo Act of 1807, the economy improved. The opposition Federalists lost voter support and the Democratic-Republicans recovered a supermajority.

== Election summaries ==
↓
107	36
Democratic-Republican	Federalist

State	Type	Date	Total seats	Democratic- Republican		Federalist	
State	Type	Date	Total seats	Seats	Change	Seats	Change
Kentucky	Districts	August 6, 1810	6	6	Steady	0	Steady
New York	Districts	April 24–26, 1810	17	12	▲3	5	▼3
North Carolina	Districts	August 9, 1810	12	10	▲1	2	▼1
Rhode Island	At-large	August 28, 1810	2	0	Steady	2	Steady
Connecticut	At-large	September 17, 1810	7	0	Steady	7	Steady
Georgia	At-large	October 1, 1810	4	4	Steady	0	Steady
Maryland	Districts	October 1, 1810	9	6	Steady	3	Steady
Delaware	At-large	October 2, 1810	1	0	Steady	1	Steady
New Jersey	At-large	October 8–9, 1810	6	6	Steady	0	Steady
South Carolina	Districts	October 8–9, 1810	8	8	Steady	0	Steady
Ohio	At-large	October 9, 1810	1	1	Steady	0	Steady
Pennsylvania	Districts	October 9, 1810	18	17	▲1	1	▼1
Vermont	Districts	November 4, 1810	4	3	▲2	1	▼2
Massachusetts	Districts	November 5, 1810 (Note: Majority required for election, which was not met in one district, so a second election held April 1, 1811.)	17	9	▲2	8	▼2
Late elections (After the March 4, 1811 beginning of the next Congress)
Virginia	Districts	April 1811	22	17	Steady	5	Steady
New Hampshire	At-large	April 1, 1811 (Note: First ballot held August 27, 1810 but required majority was not met, so a second election was held April 1, 1811.)	5	4	▲4	1	▼4
Tennessee	Districts	August 1–2, 1811	3	3	Steady	0	Steady
Total			142	106 74.6%	▲13	36 25.4%	▼13

House seats
Dem-Republican	74.83%
Federalist	25.17%

== Special elections ==
There were special elections in 1810 and 1811 to the 11th United States Congress and 12th United States Congress.

Elections are sorted by date then district.

=== 11th Congress ===
District	Incumbent			This race	
District	Member	Party	First elected	Results	Candidates
New York 2	William Denning	Democratic- Republican	1808	Incumbent resigned in 1810. New member elected April 24–26, 1810 and seated December 4, 1810. Democratic-Republican hold. Winner also elected to the next term; see below.	▌ ✓ Samuel L. Mitchill (Democratic-Republican) 52.4%; ▌John B. Coles (Federalist) 47.8%
Kentucky 5	Benjamin Howard	Democratic- Republican	1806	Incumbent resigned April 10, 1810 to become Governor of Louisiana Territory. New member elected August 6, 1810 and seated December 13, 1810. Democratic-Republican hold. Winner did not run for the next term; see below.	▌ ✓ William T. Barry (Democratic-Republican); [data missing]
Connecticut at-large	Samuel W. Dana	Federalist	1796 (special)	Incumbent resigned in May 1810 after election as U.S. senator. New member elected September 17, 1810 and seated December 3, 1810. Federalist hold. Winner lost election to the next term; see below.	▌ ✓ Ebenezer Huntington (Federalist) 42.5%; ▌Lyman Law (Federalist) 38.4%; ▌Samuel B. Sherwood (Federalist) 12.5%; ▌Nathaniel Terry (Federalist) 2.8%; ▌Others (all Federalists) 3.8%
Maryland 4	Roger Nelson	Democratic- Republican	1804 (special)	Incumbent resigned May 14, 1810 to become associate judge of the fifth judicial circuit of Maryland. New member elected October 1, 1810 and seated December 7, 1810. Democratic-Republican hold. Winner also elected to the next term; see below.	▌ ✓ Samuel Ringgold (Democratic-Republican) 98.1%; ▌Benjamin Galloway (Federalist) 1.6%
Massachusetts 10 "Worcester South district"	Jabez Upham	Federalist	1806	Incumbent resigned in 1810. New member elected October 8, 1810 and seated December 13, 1810. Federalist hold. Winner did not run to the next term; see below.	▌ ✓ Joseph Allen (Federalist) 55.2%; ▌John Spurr (Democratic-Republican) 44.8%
Massachusetts 11 "Worcester North district"	William Stedman	Federalist	1803	Incumbent resigned July 16, 1810 to become Clerk of Courts for Worcester County. New member elected October 8, 1810 and seated December 14, 1810. Federalist hold. Winner later elected to the next term; see below.	▌ ✓ Abijah Bigelow (Federalist) 72.3%; ▌Timothy Whiting (Democratic-Republican) 26.9%; ▌Moses White (Democratic-Republican) 0.8%
New Jersey at-large	James Cox	Democratic- Republican	1810	Incumbent died September 12, 1810. New member elected October 30–31, 1810 and seated December 3, 1810. Democratic-Republican hold. Winner did not run for the next term; see below.	▌ ✓ John A. Scudder (Democratic-Republican) 76.7%; ▌John Linn (Democratic-Republican) 10.8%; ▌Jacob S. Thompson (Democratic-Republican) 10.2%; ▌Isaac Mickle (Democratic-Republican) 2.3%
Virginia 1	John G. Jackson	Democratic- Republican	1803	Incumbent resigned September 28, 1810 after being wounded in a duel. New member elected in November 1810 and seated December 21, 1810. Democratic-Republican hold. Winner later lost election to the next term; see below.	▌ ✓ William McKinley (Democratic-Republican); ▌Thomas Wilson (Federalist); ▌Benjamin Reeder (Unknown) (Note: Numbers of votes missing or incomplete in source(s).)
Maryland 7	John Brown	Democratic- Republican	1808	Incumbent resigned in 1810 (Note: John Brown's resignation date is unknown, but it had to be after his October 1, 1810 re-election and before the November 15, 1810 special election to replace him.) to become clerk of the county court of Queen Anne's County. New member elected November 15, 1810 and seated December 3, 1810. Democratic-Republican hold. Winner was also elected to the next term; see below. (Note: The vacancies, for the remainder of the 11th Congress and the whole of the 12th Congress, were both filled by one ballot. This was the first of three examples of this method being used in Congressional special elections.)	▌ ✓ Robert Wright (Democratic-Republican) 51.7%; ▌Daniel C. Hopper (Unknown) 45.0%; ▌James Brown (Unknown) 3.1%; Scattering 0.2%
South Carolina 1	Robert Marion	Democratic- Republican	1804	Incumbent resigned December 4, 1810, having already retired. New member elected December 31, 1810 and seated January 24, 1811. Democratic-Republican hold. Winner had already been elected to the next term; see below.	▌ ✓ Langdon Cheves (Democratic-Republican); Uncontested

=== 12th Congress ===
District	Incumbent			This race	
District	Member	Party	First elected	Results	Candidates
Maryland 7	John Brown	Democratic- Republican	1808	Representative-elect declined to serve to become clerk of the county court of Queen Anne's County. New member elected November 15, 1810 and seated at the beginning of the Congress. Democratic-Republican hold. Winner was also elected to finish the current term; see above.	▌ ✓ Robert Wright (Democratic-Republican) 51.7%; ▌Daniel C. Hopper (Unknown) 45.0%; ▌James Brown (Unknown) 3.1%; Scattering 0.2%
Maryland 6	John Montgomery	Democratic- Republican	1806	Incumbent resigned April 29, 1811 to become Attorney General of Maryland. New member elected October 2, 1811 and seated November 4, 1811. Democratic-Republican hold.	▌ ✓ Stevenson Archer (Democratic-Republican) 76.1%; ▌William Hollingsworth (Federalist) 23.9% (Note: Based on incomplete returns)
Massachusetts 4 "Middlesex district"	Joseph B. Varnum	Democratic- Republican	1795	Incumbent resigned June 29, 1811 when elected U.S. senator. New member elected November 4, 1811 and seated January 22, 1812. Democratic-Republican hold.	First ballot (September 23, 1811): ▌John Tuttle (Democratic-Republican) 44.5%; ▌Loammi Baldwin Jr. (Federalist) 37.4%; ▌Edmund Foster (Democratic-Republican) 12.5%; ▌Marshall Spring (Democratic-Republican) 5.7%; Second ballot (November 4, 1811): ▌ ✓ William M. Richardson (Democratic-Republican) 52.1%; ▌Loammi Baldwin (Federalist) 34.7%; ▌Edmund Foster (Democratic-Republican) 8.2%; ▌Marshall Spring (Democratic-Republican) 5.0%

== Connecticut ==
District	Incumbent			This race	
District	Member	Party	First elected	Results	Candidates
Connecticut at-large 7 seats on a general ticket	Lewis B. Sturges	Federalist	1805 (special)	Incumbent re-elected.	▌ ✓ Lewis B. Sturges (Federalist) 14.8%; ▌ ✓ Jonathan O. Moseley (Federalist) 13.9%; ▌ ✓ Benjamin Tallmadge (Federalist) 13.8%; ▌ ✓ Epaphroditus Champion (Federalist) 13.6%; ▌ ✓ Timothy Pitkin (Federalist) 12.2%; ▌ ✓ Lyman Law (Federalist) 11.0%; ▌ ✓ John Davenport (Federalist) 8.4%; ▌Ebenezer Huntington (Federalist) 3.9%; ▌Samuel B. Sherwood (Federalist) 3.2%; ▌Nathan Smith (Federalist) 2.0%; ▌Nathaniel Terry (Federalist) 1.2%; ▌Sylvanus Backus (Federalist) 1.0%; ▌Sylvester Gilbert (Federalist) 0.3%; ▌John Caldwell (Federalist) 0.3%; ▌Uriel Holmes (Federalist) 0.2%; ▌Asa Bacon Jr. (Federalist) 0.2%
Connecticut at-large 7 seats on a general ticket	Jonathan O. Moseley	Federalist	1804	Incumbent re-elected.	
Connecticut at-large 7 seats on a general ticket	Benjamin Tallmadge	Federalist	1801 (special)	Incumbent re-elected.	
Connecticut at-large 7 seats on a general ticket	Epaphroditus Champion	Federalist	1806	Incumbent re-elected.	
Connecticut at-large 7 seats on a general ticket	Timothy Pitkin	Federalist	1805 (special)	Incumbent re-elected.	
Connecticut at-large 7 seats on a general ticket	Samuel W. Dana	Federalist	1796 (special)	Incumbent resigned in May 1810 after election as U.S. senator. Federalist hold. Successor (Law) was not elected to finish the current term; see above.	
Connecticut at-large 7 seats on a general ticket	John Davenport	Federalist	1798	Incumbent re-elected.	

== Delaware ==
District	Incumbent			This race	
District	Member	Party	First elected	Results	Candidates
Delaware at-large	Nicholas Van Dyke	Federalist	1807 (special)	Incumbent retired. Federalist hold.	▌ ✓ Henry M. Ridgely (Federalist) 50.1%; ▌Richard Dale (Democratic-Republican) 49.9%

== Georgia ==
District	Incumbent			This race	
District	Member	Party	First elected	Results	Candidates
Georgia at-large 4 seats on a general ticket	William W. Bibb	Democratic-Republican	1806	Incumbent re-elected.	▌ ✓ William W. Bibb (Democratic-Republican) 24.4%; ▌ ✓ George Troup (Democratic-Republican) 22.7%; ▌ ✓ Howell Cobb (Democratic-Republican) 16.9%; ▌ ✓ Bolling Hall (Democratic-Republican) 12.6%; ▌Elijah Clarke (Democratic-Republican) 10.7%; ▌John Forsyth (Democratic-Republican) 9.1%; ▌James Elliot (Federalist) 3.6%
Georgia at-large 4 seats on a general ticket	George Troup	Democratic-Republican	1806	Incumbent re-elected.	▌ ✓ William W. Bibb (Democratic-Republican) 24.4%; ▌ ✓ George Troup (Democratic-Republican) 22.7%; ▌ ✓ Howell Cobb (Democratic-Republican) 16.9%; ▌ ✓ Bolling Hall (Democratic-Republican) 12.6%; ▌Elijah Clarke (Democratic-Republican) 10.7%; ▌John Forsyth (Democratic-Republican) 9.1%; ▌James Elliot (Federalist) 3.6%
Georgia at-large 4 seats on a general ticket	Howell Cobb	Democratic-Republican	1806	Incumbent re-elected.	▌ ✓ William W. Bibb (Democratic-Republican) 24.4%; ▌ ✓ George Troup (Democratic-Republican) 22.7%; ▌ ✓ Howell Cobb (Democratic-Republican) 16.9%; ▌ ✓ Bolling Hall (Democratic-Republican) 12.6%; ▌Elijah Clarke (Democratic-Republican) 10.7%; ▌John Forsyth (Democratic-Republican) 9.1%; ▌James Elliot (Federalist) 3.6%
Georgia at-large 4 seats on a general ticket	Dennis Smelt	Democratic-Republican	1806 (special)	Incumbent retired. Democratic-Republican hold.	▌ ✓ William W. Bibb (Democratic-Republican) 24.4%; ▌ ✓ George Troup (Democratic-Republican) 22.7%; ▌ ✓ Howell Cobb (Democratic-Republican) 16.9%; ▌ ✓ Bolling Hall (Democratic-Republican) 12.6%; ▌Elijah Clarke (Democratic-Republican) 10.7%; ▌John Forsyth (Democratic-Republican) 9.1%; ▌James Elliot (Federalist) 3.6%

== Indiana Territory ==
See Non-voting delegates, below.

== Kentucky ==
District	Incumbent			This race	
District	Member	Party	First elected	Results	Candidates
Kentucky 1	Matthew Lyon	Democratic-Republican	1797 (Vermont); 1803	Incumbent lost re-election. Democratic-Republican hold.	▌ ✓ Anthony New (Democratic-Republican) 60.3%; ▌Matthew Lyon (Democratic-Republican) 39.7%
Kentucky 2	Samuel McKee	Democratic-Republican	1808	Incumbent re-elected.	▌ ✓ Samuel McKee (Democratic-Republican) 100%
Kentucky 3	Henry Crist	Democratic-Republican	1808	Incumbent retired. Democratic-Republican hold.	▌ ✓ Stephen Ormsby (Democratic-Republican); ▌Philip Quinton (Unknown)
Kentucky 4	Richard M. Johnson	Democratic-Republican	1806	Incumbent re-elected.	▌ ✓ Richard M. Johnson (Democratic-Republican); ▌John S. Hunter (Unknown)
Kentucky 5	Benjamin Howard	Democratic-Republican	1806	Incumbent resigned April 10, 1810 to become Governor of Louisiana Territory. Democratic-Republican hold. Successor was not a candidate to finish the current term, see above.	▌ ✓ Henry Clay (Democratic-Republican) 100%
Kentucky 6	Joseph Desha	Democratic-Republican	1806	Incumbent re-elected.	▌ ✓ Joseph Desha (Democratic-Republican) 100%

== Maryland ==
Maryland held its elections October 1, 1810.

District	Incumbent			This race	
District	Member	Party	First elected	Results	Candidates (Note: Only candidates with at least 1% of the vote listed)
Maryland 1	John Campbell	Federalist	1801	Incumbent retired. Federalist hold.	▌ ✓ Philip Stuart (Federalist) 98.3%; ▌John Parnham (Democratic-Republican) 1.1%
Maryland 2	Archibald Van Horne	Democratic-Republican	1806	Incumbent retired. Democratic-Republican hold.	▌ ✓ Joseph Kent (Democratic-Republican) 56.4%; ▌John F. Mercer (Federalist) 43.6%
Maryland 3	Philip Barton Key	Federalist	1806	Incumbent re-elected.	▌ ✓ Philip Barton Key (Federalist) 100%
Maryland 4	Roger Nelson	Democratic-Republican	1804 (special)	Incumbent resigned May 14, 1810 to become associate judge of the fifth judicial circuit of Maryland. Democratic-Republican hold. Successor also elected to finish the current term; see above.	▌ ✓ Samuel Ringgold (Democratic-Republican) 95.7%; ▌Benjamin Galloway (Federalist) 2.0%
Maryland 5 Plural district with 2 seats	Nicholas R. Moore	Democratic-Republican	1803	Incumbent lost re-election. Democratic-Republican hold.	▌ ✓ Alexander McKim (Democratic-Republican) 27.7%; ▌ ✓ Peter Little (Democratic-Republican) 25.7%; ▌Nicholas R. Moore (Democratic-Republican) 24.4%; ▌Joshua Barney (Democratic-Republican) 22.2%
Maryland 5 Plural district with 2 seats	Alexander McKim	Democratic-Republican	1808	Incumbent re-elected.	▌ ✓ Alexander McKim (Democratic-Republican) 27.7%; ▌ ✓ Peter Little (Democratic-Republican) 25.7%; ▌Nicholas R. Moore (Democratic-Republican) 24.4%; ▌Joshua Barney (Democratic-Republican) 22.2%
Maryland 6	John Montgomery	Democratic-Republican	1806	Incumbent re-elected.	▌ ✓ John Montgomery (Democratic-Republican) 98.1%; ▌Thomas G. Moffit (Unknown) 1.7%
Maryland 7	John Brown	Democratic-Republican	1808	Incumbent re-elected but declined the seat and resigned, leading to a special election.	▌ ✓ John Brown (Democratic-Republican) 99.7%
Maryland 8	Charles Goldsborough	Federalist	1804	Incumbent re-elected.	▌ ✓ Charles Goldsborough (Federalist) 72.3%; ▌Thomas Williams (Democratic-Republican) 27.5%

== Massachusetts ==
Massachusetts held its elections November 5, 1810. Massachusetts law required a majority for election. This was not met in the 15th district necessitating a second election on April 1, 1811.

District	Incumbent			This race	
District	Member	Party	First elected	Results	Candidates
Massachusetts 1 "Suffolk district"	Josiah Quincy	Federalist	1804	Incumbent re-elected.	▌ ✓ Josiah Quincy (Federalist) 68.9%; ▌David Tilden (Democratic-Republican) 31.1%
Massachusetts 2 "Essex South district"	Benjamin Pickman Jr.	Federalist	1808	Incumbent retired. Federalist hold.	▌ ✓ William Reed (Federalist) 53.6%; ▌Daniel Kilham (Democratic-Republican) 46.4%
Massachusetts 3 "Essex North district"	Edward St. Loe Livermore	Federalist	1806	Incumbent retired. Federalist hold.	▌ ✓ Leonard White (Federalist) 62.6%; ▌Thomas Kitteridge (Democratic-Republican) 33.5%; ▌Nehemiah Cleveland (Federalist) 3.9%
Massachusetts 4 "Middlesex district"	Joseph Bradley Varnum	Democratic-Republican	1794	Incumbent re-elected.	▌ ✓ Joseph Bradley Varnum (Democratic-Republican) 69.2%; ▌Loammi Baldwin Jr. (Federalist) 30.8%
Massachusetts 5 "Hampshire South district"	William Ely	Federalist	1804	Incumbent re-elected.	▌ ✓ William Ely (Federalist) 70.4%; ▌Samuel Fowler (Democratic-Republican) 29.0%
Massachusetts 6 "Hampshire North district"	Samuel Taggart	Federalist	1803	Incumbent re-elected.	▌ ✓ Samuel Taggart (Federalist) 72.1%; ▌Solomon Snead (Democratic-Republican) 27.9%
Massachusetts 7 "Plymouth district"	Charles Turner Jr.	Democratic-Republican	1808	Incumbent re-elected.	▌ ✓ Charles Turner Jr. (Democratic-Republican) 53.5%; ▌William Baylies (Federalist) 46.5%
Massachusetts 8 "Barnstable district"	Gideon Gardner	Democratic-Republican	1808	Incumbent retired. Democratic-Republican hold.	▌ ✓ Isaiah L. Green (Democratic-Republican) 57.1%; ▌Francis Rotch (Federalist) 42.7%
Massachusetts 9 "Bristol district"	Laban Wheaton	Federalist	1808	Incumbent re-elected.	▌ ✓ Laban Wheaton (Federalist) 51.8%; ▌Nathaniel Morton (Democratic-Republican) 48.0%
Massachusetts 10 "Worcester South district"	Joseph Allen	Federalist	1810 (special)	Incumbent retired. Federalist hold.	▌ ✓ Elijah Brigham (Federalist) 53.5%; ▌John Spurr (Democratic-Republican) 46.4%
Massachusetts 11 "Worcester North district"	Abijah Bigelow	Federalist	1810 (special)	Incumbent re-elected.	▌ ✓ Abijah Bigelow (Federalist) 70.6%; ▌Timothy Whiting (Democratic-Republican) 28.5%
Massachusetts 12 "Berkshire district"	Ezekiel Bacon	Democratic-Republican	1807 (special)	Incumbent re-elected.	▌ ✓ Ezekiel Bacon (Democratic-Republican) 56.1%; ▌Thomas Ives (Democratic-Republican) 43.9%
Massachusetts 13 "Norfolk district"	Ebenezer Seaver	Democratic-Republican	1803	Incumbent re-elected.	▌ ✓ Ebenezer Seaver (Democratic-Republican) 63.2%; ▌Timothy Jackson (Federalist) 21.2%; ▌James Richardson (Federalist) 10.2%; ▌James Mann (Unknown) 4.2%; Others 1.2%
Massachusetts 14 "York district" District of Maine	Richard Cutts	Democratic-Republicans	1801	Incumbent re-elected.	▌ ✓ Richard Cutts (Democratic-Republican) 62.7%; ▌Cyrus King (Federalist) 37.3%
Massachusetts 15 "Cumberland district" District of Maine	Ezekiel Whitman	Federalist	1808	Incumbent lost re-election. Democratic-Republican gain.	First ballot (November 5, 1810): ▌Ezekiel Whitman (Federalist) 47.8% (Note: Tied); ▌William Widgery (Democratic-Republican) 47.8%; Others 4.4%; Second ballot (April 1, 1811): ▌ ✓ William Widgery (Democratic-Republican) 53.2%; ▌Ezekiel Whitman (Federalist) 46.8%
Massachusetts 16 "Lincoln district" District of Maine	Orchard Cook	Democratic-Republican	1804	Incumbent retired. Democratic-Republican hold.	▌ ✓ Peleg Tallman (Democratic-Republican) 61.1%; ▌Alden Bradford (Federalist) 38.9%
Massachusetts 17 "Kennebec district" District of Maine	Barzillai Gannett	Democratic-Republican	1808	Incumbent re-elected.	▌ ✓ Barzillai Gannett (Democratic-Republican) 60.5%; ▌Thomas Rice (Federalist) 39.5%

== Mississippi Territory ==
See Non-voting delegates, below.

== New Hampshire ==
New Hampshire law required a candidate to receive votes from a majority of voters (10%). In the initial election, only two candidates won a majority, so a second election was held in April 1811 for the remaining three seats, after the congressional term began but before the Congress formally convened. The data from the source used give majorities to all the top five candidates, suggesting that the data are incomplete.

District	Incumbent			This race	
District	Member	Party	First elected	Results	Candidates
New Hampshire at-large 5 seats on a general ticket	Daniel Blaisdell	Federalist	1808	Incumbent lost re-election. Democratic-Republican gain.	First ballot (August 27, 1810): ▌ ✓ Josiah Bartlett Jr. (Democratic-Republican) 10.2%; ▌ ✓ Samuel Dinsmoor (Democratic-Republican) 10.1%; ▌George Sullivan (Federalist) 10.1%; ▌William Hale (Federalist) 10.1%; ▌Roger Vose (Federalist) 10.0%; ▌Daniel Blaisdell (Federalist) 10.0%; ▌Obed Hall (Democratic-Republican) 10.0%; ▌John Adams Harper (Democratic-Republican) 9.9%; ▌James Wilson (Federalist) 9.8%; ▌David Morrill (Democratic-Republican) 9.8%; Second ballot (April 1, 1811): ▌ ✓ John Adams Harper (Democratic-Republican) 21.2%; ▌ ✓ Obed Hall (Democratic-Republican) 21.2%; ▌ ✓ George Sullivan (Federalist) 19.2%; ▌William Hale (Federalist) 19.1%; ▌Daniel Blaisdell (Federalist) 18.9%; ▌Roger Vose (Federalist) 0.3%
New Hampshire at-large 5 seats on a general ticket	John Curtis Chamberlain	Federalist	1808	Incumbent retired. Democratic-Republican gain.	
New Hampshire at-large 5 seats on a general ticket	William Hale	Federalist	1808	Incumbent lost re-election. Democratic-Republican gain.	
New Hampshire at-large 5 seats on a general ticket	Nathaniel Appleton Haven	Federalist	1808	Incumbent retired. Democratic-Republican gain.	
New Hampshire at-large 5 seats on a general ticket	James Wilson	Federalist	1808	Incumbent lost re-election. Federalist hold.	

== New Jersey ==
The Federalists ran no official ticket in 1810, but votes were received for various Federalists in some counties.

District	Incumbent			This race	
District	Member	Party	First elected	Results	Candidates
New Jersey at-large 6 seats on a general ticket	Adam Boyd	Democratic-Republican	1803; 1804 (retired); 1808 (special)	Incumbent re-elected.	▌ ✓ Adam Boyd (Democratic-Republican) 16.4%; ▌ ✓ Lewis Condict (Democratic-Republican) 16.4%; ▌ ✓ George C. Maxwell (Democratic-Republican) 16.4%; ▌ ✓ Jacob Hufty (Democratic-Republican) 16.3%; ▌ ✓ Thomas Newbold (Democratic-Republican) 16.3%; ▌ ✓ James Morgan (Democratic-Republican) 16.1%; ▌Aaron Ogden (Federalist) 0.6%; ▌William Coxe Jr. (Federalist) 0.4%; ▌John Neilson (Federalist) 0.4%; ▌Richard Stockton (Federalist) 0.3%; ▌Thomas Sinnickson (Federalist) 0.2%; ▌John Beatty (Federalist) 0.2%
New Jersey at-large 6 seats on a general ticket	Thomas Newbold	Democratic-Republican	1806	Incumbent re-elected.	▌ ✓ Adam Boyd (Democratic-Republican) 16.4%; ▌ ✓ Lewis Condict (Democratic-Republican) 16.4%; ▌ ✓ George C. Maxwell (Democratic-Republican) 16.4%; ▌ ✓ Jacob Hufty (Democratic-Republican) 16.3%; ▌ ✓ Thomas Newbold (Democratic-Republican) 16.3%; ▌ ✓ James Morgan (Democratic-Republican) 16.1%; ▌Aaron Ogden (Federalist) 0.6%; ▌William Coxe Jr. (Federalist) 0.4%; ▌John Neilson (Federalist) 0.4%; ▌Richard Stockton (Federalist) 0.3%; ▌Thomas Sinnickson (Federalist) 0.2%; ▌John Beatty (Federalist) 0.2%
New Jersey at-large 6 seats on a general ticket	William Helms	Democratic-Republican	1800	Incumbent retired. Federalist hold.	▌ ✓ Adam Boyd (Democratic-Republican) 16.4%; ▌ ✓ Lewis Condict (Democratic-Republican) 16.4%; ▌ ✓ George C. Maxwell (Democratic-Republican) 16.4%; ▌ ✓ Jacob Hufty (Democratic-Republican) 16.3%; ▌ ✓ Thomas Newbold (Democratic-Republican) 16.3%; ▌ ✓ James Morgan (Democratic-Republican) 16.1%; ▌Aaron Ogden (Federalist) 0.6%; ▌William Coxe Jr. (Federalist) 0.4%; ▌John Neilson (Federalist) 0.4%; ▌Richard Stockton (Federalist) 0.3%; ▌Thomas Sinnickson (Federalist) 0.2%; ▌John Beatty (Federalist) 0.2%
New Jersey at-large 6 seats on a general ticket	John A. Scudder	Democratic-Republican	1810 (special)	Incumbent retired. Federalist hold.	▌ ✓ Adam Boyd (Democratic-Republican) 16.4%; ▌ ✓ Lewis Condict (Democratic-Republican) 16.4%; ▌ ✓ George C. Maxwell (Democratic-Republican) 16.4%; ▌ ✓ Jacob Hufty (Democratic-Republican) 16.3%; ▌ ✓ Thomas Newbold (Democratic-Republican) 16.3%; ▌ ✓ James Morgan (Democratic-Republican) 16.1%; ▌Aaron Ogden (Federalist) 0.6%; ▌William Coxe Jr. (Federalist) 0.4%; ▌John Neilson (Federalist) 0.4%; ▌Richard Stockton (Federalist) 0.3%; ▌Thomas Sinnickson (Federalist) 0.2%; ▌John Beatty (Federalist) 0.2%
New Jersey at-large 6 seats on a general ticket	Henry Southard	Democratic-Republican	1800	Incumbent retired. Federalist hold.	▌ ✓ Adam Boyd (Democratic-Republican) 16.4%; ▌ ✓ Lewis Condict (Democratic-Republican) 16.4%; ▌ ✓ George C. Maxwell (Democratic-Republican) 16.4%; ▌ ✓ Jacob Hufty (Democratic-Republican) 16.3%; ▌ ✓ Thomas Newbold (Democratic-Republican) 16.3%; ▌ ✓ James Morgan (Democratic-Republican) 16.1%; ▌Aaron Ogden (Federalist) 0.6%; ▌William Coxe Jr. (Federalist) 0.4%; ▌John Neilson (Federalist) 0.4%; ▌Richard Stockton (Federalist) 0.3%; ▌Thomas Sinnickson (Federalist) 0.2%; ▌John Beatty (Federalist) 0.2%
New Jersey at-large 6 seats on a general ticket	Jacob Hufty	Democratic-Republican	1808	Incumbent re-elected.	▌ ✓ Adam Boyd (Democratic-Republican) 16.4%; ▌ ✓ Lewis Condict (Democratic-Republican) 16.4%; ▌ ✓ George C. Maxwell (Democratic-Republican) 16.4%; ▌ ✓ Jacob Hufty (Democratic-Republican) 16.3%; ▌ ✓ Thomas Newbold (Democratic-Republican) 16.3%; ▌ ✓ James Morgan (Democratic-Republican) 16.1%; ▌Aaron Ogden (Federalist) 0.6%; ▌William Coxe Jr. (Federalist) 0.4%; ▌John Neilson (Federalist) 0.4%; ▌Richard Stockton (Federalist) 0.3%; ▌Thomas Sinnickson (Federalist) 0.2%; ▌John Beatty (Federalist) 0.2%

== New York ==
District	Incumbent			This race	
District	Member	Party	First elected	Results	Candidates
New York 1	Ebenezer Sage	Democratic- Republican	1808	Incumbent re-elected.	▌ ✓ Ebenezer Sage (Democratic-Republican) 93.5%; ▌David Gardiner (Federalist) 6.5%
New York 2 Plural district with 2 seats	William Denning	Democratic- Republican	1808	Incumbent resigned in 1810. Democratic-Republican hold. Successor also elected the same day to finish the current term; see above.	▌ ✓ Samuel L. Mitchill (Democratic-Republican) 26.4%; ▌ ✓ William Paulding Jr. (Democratic-Republican) 26.1%; ▌John B. Coles (Federalist) 23.8%; ▌Peter A. Jay (Federalist) 23.7%
New York 2 Plural district with 2 seats	Gurdon S. Mumford	Democratic- Republican	1804 (special)	Incumbent retired. Democratic-Republican hold.	▌ ✓ Samuel L. Mitchill (Democratic-Republican) 26.4%; ▌ ✓ William Paulding Jr. (Democratic-Republican) 26.1%; ▌John B. Coles (Federalist) 23.8%; ▌Peter A. Jay (Federalist) 23.7%
New York 3	Jonathan Fisk	Democratic- Republican	1808	Incumbent retired. Democratic-Republican hold.	▌ ✓ Pierre Van Cortlandt Jr. (Democratic-Republican) 63.9%; ▌John Bradner (Federalist) 36.1%
New York 4	James Emott	Federalist	1808	Incumbent re-elected.	▌ ✓ James Emott (Federalist) 51.1%; ▌Daniel C. Verplanck (Democratic-Republican) 48.9%
New York 5	Barent Gardenier	Federalist	1806	Incumbent retired. Democratic-Republican gain.	▌ ✓ Thomas B. Cooke (Democratic-Republican) 52.1%; ▌Gerrit Abeel (Federalist) 47.9%
New York 6 Plural district with 2 seats	Herman Knickerbocker	Federalist	1808	Incumbent retired. Federalist hold.	▌ ✓ Asa Fitch (Federalist) 25.6%; ▌ ✓ Robert Le Roy Livingston (Federalist) 25.6%; ▌Roger Skinner (Democratic-Republican) 24.4%; ▌James L. Hogeboom (Democratic-Republican) 24.4%
New York 6 Plural district with 2 seats	Robert Le Roy Livingston	Federalist	1808	Incumbent re-elected.	▌ ✓ Asa Fitch (Federalist) 25.6%; ▌ ✓ Robert Le Roy Livingston (Federalist) 25.6%; ▌Roger Skinner (Democratic-Republican) 24.4%; ▌James L. Hogeboom (Democratic-Republican) 24.4%
New York 7	Killian Van Rensselaer	Federalist	1800	Incumbent retired. Federalist hold.	▌ ✓ Harmanus Bleecker (Federalist) 57.6%; ▌John V. Veeder (Democratic-Republican) 42.4%
New York 8	John Thompson	Democratic- Republican	1806	Incumbent retired. Democratic-Republican hold.	▌ ✓ Benjamin Pond (Democratic-Republican) 57.6%; ▌James McCrea (Federalist) 42.4%
New York 9	Thomas Sammons	Federalist	1808	Incumbent re-elected in a different party. Democratic-Republican gain.	▌ ✓ Thomas Sammons (Democratic-Republican) 52.6%; ▌Richard Van Horne (Federalist) 47.4%
New York 10	John Nicholson	Democratic- Republican	1808	Incumbent retired. Democratic-Republican hold.	▌ ✓ Silas Stow (Democratic-Republican) 51.3%; ▌Simeon Ford (Federalist) 48.7%
New York 11	Thomas R. Gold	Federalist	1808	Incumbent re-elected.	▌ ✓ Thomas R. Gold (Federalist) 52.6%; ▌Thomas Skinner (Democratic-Republican) 47.4%
New York 12	Erastus Root	Democratic- Republican	1808	Incumbent retired. Democratic-Republican hold.	▌ ✓ Arunah Metcalf (Democratic-Republican) 56.2%; ▌John M. Bowers (Federalist) 43.8%
New York 13	Uri Tracy	Democratic- Republican	1808	Incumbent re-elected.	▌ ✓ Uri Tracy (Democratic-Republican) 60.2%; ▌Nathaniel Waldron (Federalist) 39.8%
New York 14	Vincent Mathews	Federalist	1808	Incumbent retired. Democratic-Republican gain.	▌ ✓ Daniel Avery (Democratic-Republican) 69.8%; ▌John Harris (Federalist) 30.2%
New York 15	Peter B. Porter	Democratic- Republican	1808	Incumbent re-elected.	▌ ✓ Peter B. Porter (Democratic-Republican) 59.1%; ▌Ebenezer F. Norton (Federalist) 40.9%

== North Carolina ==
District	Incumbent			This race	
District	Member	Party	First elected	Results	Candidates
North Carolina 1	Lemuel Sawyer	Democratic-Republican	1806	Incumbent re-elected.	▌ ✓ Lemuel Sawyer (Democratic-Republican) 61.4%; ▌William Hinton (Democratic-Republican) 37.1%; ▌Joseph Riddick (Democratic-Republican) 1.5%
North Carolina 2	Willis Alston	Democratic-Republican	1798	Incumbent re-elected.	▌ ✓ Willis Alston (Democratic-Republican) 65.9%; ▌Joseph H. Bryon (Federalist) 34.1%
North Carolina 3	William Kennedy	Democratic-Republican	1803; 1804 (lost); 1808	Incumbent retired. Democratic-Republican hold.	▌ ✓ Thomas Blount (Democratic-Republican)
North Carolina 4	John Stanly	Federalist	1800; 1803 (lost); 1808	Incumbent retired. Democratic-Republican gain.	▌ ✓ William Blackledge (Democratic-Republican) 54.8%; ▌William Gaston (Federalist) 45.2%
North Carolina 5	Thomas Kenan	Democratic-Republican	1805 (special)	Incumbent retired. Democratic-Republican hold.	▌ ✓ William R. King (Democratic-Republican) 67.8%; ▌Christopher Dudley (Federalist) 32.2%
North Carolina 6	Nathaniel Macon	Democratic-Republican	1791	Incumbent re-elected.	▌ ✓ Nathaniel Macon (Democratic-Republican) 100%
North Carolina 7	Archibald McBryde	Federalist	1808	Incumbent re-elected.	▌ ✓ Archibald McBryde (Federalist) 57.4%; ▌John Culpepper (Federalist) 42.6%
North Carolina 8	Richard Stanford	Democratic-Republican	1796	Incumbent re-elected.	▌ ✓ Richard Stanford (Democratic-Republican) 100%
North Carolina 9	James Cochran	Democratic-Republican	1808	Incumbent re-elected.	▌ ✓ James Cochran (Democratic-Republican) 57.0%; ▌Theophilus Lacy (Democratic-Republican) 43.0%
North Carolina 10	Joseph Pearson	Federalist	1808	Incumbent re-elected.	▌ ✓ Joseph Pearson (Federalist) 63.8%; ▌James Wallis (Democratic-Republican) 36.4%
North Carolina 11	James Holland	Democratic-Republican	1800	Incumbent retired. Democratic-Republican hold.	▌ ✓ Israel Pickens (Democratic-Republican) 50.5%; ▌Felix Walker (Democratic-Republican) 39.8%; ▌John Stevelie (Democratic-Republican) 9.7%
North Carolina 12	Meshack Franklin	Democratic-Republican	1806	Incumbent re-elected.	▌ ✓ Meshack Franklin (Democratic-Republican)

== Ohio ==
This was the last election in which Ohio had a single at-large district. Due to rapid population growth in the state, the at-large district had become disproportionately populous by this point.

District	Incumbent			This race	
District	Member	Party	First elected	Results	Candidates
Ohio at-large	Jeremiah Morrow	D-R Quid	1803	Incumbent re-elected as a mainline Democratic-Republican. Democratic-Republican gain.	▌ ✓ Jeremiah Morrow (Democratic-Republican) 99.4%; Others 0.6%

== Pennsylvania ==
District	Incumbent			This race	
District	Member	Party	First elected	Results	Candidates
Pennsylvania 1 Plural district with 3 seats	Adam Seybert	Democratic-Republican	1809 (special)	Incumbent re-elected.	▌ ✓ Adam Seybert (Democratic-Republican) 19.8%; ▌ ✓ William Anderson (Democratic-Republican) 19.6%; ▌ ✓ James Milnor (Federalist) 13.7%; ▌Thomas Truxton (Federalist) 13.7%; ▌Thomas Dick (Federalist) 13.4%; ▌John Porter (Democratic-Republican) 9.9%; ▌Robert McMullin (Democratic-Republican) 9.9%
Pennsylvania 1 Plural district with 3 seats	William Anderson	Democratic-Republican	1808	Incumbent re-elected.	▌ ✓ Adam Seybert (Democratic-Republican) 19.8%; ▌ ✓ William Anderson (Democratic-Republican) 19.6%; ▌ ✓ James Milnor (Federalist) 13.7%; ▌Thomas Truxton (Federalist) 13.7%; ▌Thomas Dick (Federalist) 13.4%; ▌John Porter (Democratic-Republican) 9.9%; ▌Robert McMullin (Democratic-Republican) 9.9%
Pennsylvania 1 Plural district with 3 seats	John Porter	Democratic-Republican	1806	Incumbent lost re-election. Federalist gain.	▌ ✓ Adam Seybert (Democratic-Republican) 19.8%; ▌ ✓ William Anderson (Democratic-Republican) 19.6%; ▌ ✓ James Milnor (Federalist) 13.7%; ▌Thomas Truxton (Federalist) 13.7%; ▌Thomas Dick (Federalist) 13.4%; ▌John Porter (Democratic-Republican) 9.9%; ▌Robert McMullin (Democratic-Republican) 9.9%
Pennsylvania 2 Plural district with 3 seats	Robert Brown	Democratic-Republican	1798 (special)	Incumbent re-elected.	▌ ✓ Robert Brown (Democratic-Republican) 19.1%; ▌ ✓ Jonathan Roberts (Democratic-Republican) 19.0%; ▌ ✓ William Rodman (Democratic-Republican) 18.9%; ▌William Milnor (Federalist) 14.5%; ▌Levi Paulding (Federalist) 14.2%; ▌William Latimere (Federalist) 13.9%; ▌Charles Miner (Federalist) 0.4%
Pennsylvania 2 Plural district with 3 seats	William Milnor	Federalist	1806	Incumbent lost re-election. Democratic-Republican gain.	▌ ✓ Robert Brown (Democratic-Republican) 19.1%; ▌ ✓ Jonathan Roberts (Democratic-Republican) 19.0%; ▌ ✓ William Rodman (Democratic-Republican) 18.9%; ▌William Milnor (Federalist) 14.5%; ▌Levi Paulding (Federalist) 14.2%; ▌William Latimere (Federalist) 13.9%; ▌Charles Miner (Federalist) 0.4%
Pennsylvania 2 Plural district with 3 seats	John Ross	Democratic-Republican	1808	Incumbent retired. Democratic-Republican hold.	▌ ✓ Robert Brown (Democratic-Republican) 19.1%; ▌ ✓ Jonathan Roberts (Democratic-Republican) 19.0%; ▌ ✓ William Rodman (Democratic-Republican) 18.9%; ▌William Milnor (Federalist) 14.5%; ▌Levi Paulding (Federalist) 14.2%; ▌William Latimere (Federalist) 13.9%; ▌Charles Miner (Federalist) 0.4%
Pennsylvania 3 Plural district with 3 seats	Robert Jenkins	Federalist	1806	Incumbent retired. Democratic-Republican gain.	▌ ✓ Joseph Lefever (Democratic-Republican) 18.4%; ▌ ✓ Roger Davis (Democratic-Republican) 18.3%; ▌ ✓ John M. Hyneman (Democratic-Republican) 17.2%; ▌Daniel Hiester (Federalist) (Note: Changed parties) 16.0%; ▌Samuel Bethel (Federalist) 15.1%; ▌Mark J. Biddle (Federalist) 15.0%
Pennsylvania 3 Plural district with 3 seats	Matthias Richards	Democratic-Republican	1806	Incumbent retired. Democratic-Republican hold.	▌ ✓ Joseph Lefever (Democratic-Republican) 18.4%; ▌ ✓ Roger Davis (Democratic-Republican) 18.3%; ▌ ✓ John M. Hyneman (Democratic-Republican) 17.2%; ▌Daniel Hiester (Federalist) 16.0%; ▌Samuel Bethel (Federalist) 15.1%; ▌Mark J. Biddle (Federalist) 15.0%
Pennsylvania 3 Plural district with 3 seats	Daniel Hiester	Democratic-Republican	1808	Incumbent lost re-election. Democratic-Republican hold.	▌ ✓ Joseph Lefever (Democratic-Republican) 18.4%; ▌ ✓ Roger Davis (Democratic-Republican) 18.3%; ▌ ✓ John M. Hyneman (Democratic-Republican) 17.2%; ▌Daniel Hiester (Federalist) 16.0%; ▌Samuel Bethel (Federalist) 15.1%; ▌Mark J. Biddle (Federalist) 15.0%
Pennsylvania 4 Plural district with 2 seats	Robert Whitehill	Democratic-Republican	1805 (special)	Incumbent re-elected.	▌ ✓ David Bard (Democratic-Republican) 50.0%; ▌ ✓ Robert Whitehill (Democratic-Republican) 50.0%
Pennsylvania 4 Plural district with 2 seats	David Bard	Democratic-Republican	1802	Incumbent re-elected.	▌ ✓ David Bard (Democratic-Republican) 50.0%; ▌ ✓ Robert Whitehill (Democratic-Republican) 50.0%
Pennsylvania 5	George Smith	Democratic-Republican	1808	Incumbent re-elected.	▌ ✓ George Smith (Democratic-Republican) 100%
Pennsylvania 6	William Crawford	Democratic-Republican	1808	Incumbent re-elected.	▌ ✓ William Crawford (Democratic-Republican) 56.6%; ▌David Cassat (Federalist) 43.4%
Pennsylvania 7	John Rea	Democratic-Republican	1802	Incumbent lost re-election. Democratic-Republican hold.	▌ ✓ William Piper (Democratic-Republican) 58.5%; ▌John Rea (Democratic-Republican) 41.5%
Pennsylvania 8	William Findley	Democratic-Republican	1802	Incumbent re-elected.	▌ ✓ William Findley (Democratic-Republican) 60.9%; ▌John Kirkpatrick (Democratic-Republican) 39.1%
Pennsylvania 9	John Smilie	Democratic-Republican	1792; 1794 (retired); 1798	Incumbent re-elected.	▌ ✓ John Smilie (Democratic-Republican) 100%
Pennsylvania 10	Aaron Lyle	Democratic-Republican	1808	Incumbent re-elected.	▌ ✓ Aaron Lyle (Democratic-Republican) 70.4%; ▌Thomas L. Birch (Federalist) 29.6%
Pennsylvania 11	Samuel Smith	Democratic-Republican	1805 (special)	Incumbent lost re-election. Democratic-Republican hold.	▌ ✓ Abner Lacock (Democratic-Republican) 51.0%; ▌Adamson Tannehill (Democratic-Republican) 43.2%; ▌Samuel Smith (Democratic-Republican) 5.7%

== Rhode Island ==
District	Incumbent			This race	
District	Member	Party	First elected	Results	Candidates
Rhode Island at-large 2 seats on a general ticket	Richard Jackson Jr.	Federalist	1808	Incumbent re-elected.	▌ ✓ Elisha R. Potter (Federalist) 25.7%; ▌ ✓ Richard Jackson Jr. (Federalist) 25.6%; ▌Nathaniel Hazard (Democratic-Republican) 24.5%; ▌Nathan Brown (Democratic-Republican) 24.2%
Rhode Island at-large 2 seats on a general ticket	Elisha R. Potter	Federalist	1808	Incumbent re-elected.	▌ ✓ Elisha R. Potter (Federalist) 25.7%; ▌ ✓ Richard Jackson Jr. (Federalist) 25.6%; ▌Nathaniel Hazard (Democratic-Republican) 24.5%; ▌Nathan Brown (Democratic-Republican) 24.2%

== South Carolina ==
District	Incumbent			This race	
District	Member	Party	First elected	Results	Candidates
South Carolina 1 "Charleston district"	Robert Marion	Democratic- Republican	1804	Incumbent retired. Democratic-Republican hold. Incumbent then resigned December 4, 1810 and successor was also elected to finish the current term; see above.	▌ ✓ Langdon Cheves (Democratic-Republican) 89.2%; Others 10.8%
South Carolina 2 "Beaufort district"	William Butler Sr.	Democratic- Republican	1800	Incumbent re-elected.	▌ ✓ William Butler Sr. (Democratic-Republican); ▌Edmund Bacon (Democratic-Republican); ▌Francisco Annone (Federalist)
South Carolina 3 "Georgetown district"	Robert Witherspoon	Democratic- Republican	1808	Incumbent retired. Democratic-Republican hold.	▌ ✓ David R. Williams (Democratic-Republican) 94.4%; ▌Moses Glover (Federalist) 5.6%
South Carolina 4 "Orangeburgh district"	John Taylor	Democratic- Republican	1806	Incumbent lost re-election. Democratic-Republican hold.	▌ ✓ William Lowndes (Democratic-Republican) 52.2%; ▌John Taylor (Democratic-Republican) 47.8%
South Carolina 5 "Sumter district"	Richard Winn	Democratic- Republican	1802 (special)	Incumbent re-elected.	▌ ✓ Richard Winn (Democratic-Republican) 100%
South Carolina 6 "Abbeville district"	Joseph Calhoun	Democratic- Republican	1807 (special)	Incumbent retired. Democratic-Republican hold.	▌ ✓ John C. Calhoun (Democratic-Republican) 72.2%; ▌John A. Elmore (Democratic-Republican) 27.8%; ▌Eastland (Note: Source did not have full name) (Federalist)
South Carolina 7 "Chester district"	Thomas Moore	Democratic- Republican	1800	Incumbent re-elected.	▌ ✓ Thomas Moore (Democratic-Republican) 100%
South Carolina 8 "Pendleton district"	Lemuel J. Alston	Democratic- Republican	1806	Incumbent retired. Democratic-Republican hold.	▌ ✓ Elias Earle (Democratic-Republican) 58.0%; ▌William Hunter (Federalist) 42.0%

== Tennessee ==
District	Incumbent			This race	
District	Member	Party	First elected	Results	Candidates
Tennessee 1	John Rhea	Democratic-Republican	1803	Incumbent re-elected.	▌ ✓ John Rhea (Democratic-Republican); Uncontested
Tennessee 2	Robert Weakley	Democratic-Republican	1809	Incumbent retired. Democratic-Republican hold.	▌ ✓ John Sevier (Democratic-Republican); Uncontested
Tennessee 3	Pleasant M. Miller	Democratic-Republican	1809	Incumbent retired. Democratic-Republican hold.	▌ ✓ Felix Grundy (Democratic-Republican) 60.4%; ▌Isaac Roberts (Unknown) 21.7%; ▌James Winchester (Unknown) 17.9%

== Vermont ==
District	Incumbent			This race	
District	Member	Party	First elected	Results	Candidates
Vermont 1	Samuel Shaw	Democratic- Republican	1808	Incumbent re-elected.	▌ ✓ Samuel Shaw (Democratic-Republican) 64.4%; ▌Chauncey Langdon (Federalist) 33.5%
Vermont 2	Jonathan H. Hubbard	Federalist	1808	Incumbent lost re-election. Democratic-Republican gain.	▌ ✓ William Strong (Democratic-Republican) 53.4%; ▌Jonathan H. Hubbard (Federalist) 42.1%; ▌Aaron Leland (Democratic-Republican) 1.7%
Vermont 3	William Chamberlain	Federalist	1802; 1805 (lost); 1808	Incumbent lost re-election. Democratic-Republican gain.	▌ ✓ James Fisk (Democratic-Republican) 56.7%; ▌William Chamberlain (Federalist) 41.3%
Vermont 4	Martin Chittenden	Federalist	1803	Incumbent re-elected.	▌ ✓ Martin Chittenden (Federalist) 50.0%; ▌Ezra Butler (Democratic-Republican) 47.5%

== Virginia ==
District	Incumbent			This race	
District	Member	Party	First elected	Results	Candidates
Virginia 1	William McKinley	Democratic-Republican	1810 (special)	Incumbent lost re-election. Federalist gain.	▌ ✓ Thomas Wilson (Federalist) 52.3%; ▌William McKinley (Democratic-Republican) 47.7%
Virginia 2	James Stephenson	Federalist	1809	Incumbent retired. Federalist hold.	▌ ✓ John Baker (Federalist) 56.5%; ▌Daniel Morgan (Democratic-Republican) 43.5%
Virginia 3	John Smith	Democratic-Republican	1801	Incumbent re-elected.	▌ ✓ John Smith (Democratic-Republican) 100%
Virginia 4	Jacob Swoope	Federalist	1809	Incumbent retired. Democratic-Republican gain.	▌ ✓ William McCoy (Democratic-Republican) 52.6%; ▌Samuel Blackburn (Federalist) 47.4%
Virginia 5	James Breckinridge	Federalist	1809	Incumbent re-elected.	▌ ✓ James Breckinridge (Federalist) 58.4%; ▌Thomas L. Preston (Democratic-Republican) 41.6%
Virginia 6	Daniel Sheffey	Federalist	1809	Incumbent re-elected.	▌ ✓ Daniel Sheffey (Federalist) 100%
Virginia 7	Joseph Lewis Jr.	Federalist	1803	Incumbent re-elected.	▌ ✓ Joseph Lewis Jr. (Federalist) 80.0%; ▌John Love (Democratic-Republican) 19.9%
Virginia 7	John Love; Moved from the 9th district	Democratic-Republican	1807	Incumbent lost re-election. Democratic-Republican loss.	▌ ✓ Joseph Lewis Jr. (Federalist) 80.0%; ▌John Love (Democratic-Republican) 19.9%
Virginia 8	Walter Jones	Democratic-Republican	1803	Incumbent retired. Democratic-Republican hold. John Taliaferro (D-R) was seated on December 2, 1811, after successfully challenging the election in the House Committee on Elections.	▌ ✓ John Hungerford (Democratic-Republican) 50.2%; ▌John Taliaferro (Democratic-Republican) 49.8%
Virginia 9	Open seat			Open seat. Democratic-Republican gain.	▌ ✓ Aylett Hawes (Democratic-Republican) 72.7%; ▌George F. Strother (Democratic-Republican) 26.3%
Virginia 10	John Dawson	Democratic-Republican	1797	Incumbent re-elected.	▌ ✓ John Dawson (Democratic-Republican) 100%
Virginia 11	John Roane	Democratic-Republican	1809	Incumbent re-elected.	▌ ✓ John Roane (Democratic-Republican)
Virginia 12	Burwell Bassett	Democratic-Republican	1805	Incumbent re-elected.	▌ ✓ Burwell Bassett (Democratic-Republican) 59.5%; ▌John Eyre (Federalist) 40.5%
Virginia 13	William A. Burwell	Democratic-Republican	1806 (special)	Incumbent re-elected.	▌ ✓ William A. Burwell (Democratic-Republican) 100%
Virginia 14	Matthew Clay	Democratic-Republican	1797	Incumbent re-elected.	▌ ✓ Matthew Clay (Democratic-Republican) (Note: Detailed data not available, but margin of victory given as 223 votes); ▌John Kerr (Democratic-Republican)
Virginia 15	John Randolph; Moved from the 16th district	D-R Quid	1799	Incumbent re-elected.	▌ ✓ John Randolph (D-R Quid) 67.8%; ▌John W. Eppes (Democratic-Republican) 32.2%
Virginia 15	John W. Eppes; Moved from the 16th district	Democratic-Republican	1807	Incumbent lost re-election. Democratic-Republican loss.	▌ ✓ John Randolph (D-R Quid) 67.8%; ▌John W. Eppes (Democratic-Republican) 32.2%
Virginia 16	Open seat			Open seat. Democratic-Republican gain.	▌ ✓ James Pleasants (Democratic-Republican) 100%
Virginia 17	Thomas Gholson Jr.	Democratic-Republican	1808 (special)	Incumbent re-elected.	▌ ✓ Thomas Gholson Jr. (Democratic-Republican) 100%
Virginia 18	Peterson Goodwyn	Democratic-Republican	1803	Incumbent re-elected.	▌ ✓ Peterson Goodwyn (Democratic-Republican) 100%
Virginia 19	Edwin Gray	D-R Quid	1799	Incumbent re-elected.	▌ ✓ Edwin Gray (D-R Quid) 62.2%; ▌Samuel Butler (Democratic-Republican) 37.8%
Virginia 20	Thomas Newton Jr.	Democratic-Republican	1799	Incumbent re-elected.	▌ ✓ Thomas Newton Jr. (Democratic-Republican) 97.7%; ▌Robert B. Taylor (Federalist) 2.3%
Virginia 21	David S. Garland	Democratic-Republican	1809 (special)	Incumbent retired. Democratic-Republican hold.	▌ ✓ Hugh Nelson (Democratic-Republican) 100%
Virginia 22	John Clopton	Democratic-Republican	1801	Incumbent re-elected.	▌ ✓ John Clopton (Democratic-Republican) 100%

== Non-voting delegates ==
There were five territories with the right to send non-voting delegates to the 12th Congress. Two of them, Illinois Territory and Missouri Territory elected their first representative near the end of the 12th Congress in 1812, while Orleans Territory's seat remained vacant until the territory was admitted as the State of Louisiana.

District	Incumbent			This race	
District	Delegate	Party	First elected	Results	Candidates
Indiana Territory at-large	Jonathan Jennings	Democratic-Republican	1809	Incumbent re-elected.	▌ ✓ Jonathan Jennings (Democratic-Republican) 65.1%; ▌Thomas Randolph (Unknown) 34.9%
Mississippi Territory at-large	George Poindexter	Democratic-Republican	1806	Incumbent re-elected.	▌ ✓ George Poindexter (Democratic-Republican) 64.6%; ▌Robert Williams (Democratic-Republican) 28.2%; ▌David Cooper (Unknown) 6.7%

== See also ==
- 1810 United States elections
  - List of United States House of Representatives elections (1789–1822)
  - 1810–11 United States Senate elections
- 11th United States Congress
- 12th United States Congress

== Bibliography ==
- "A New Nation Votes: American Election Returns 1787-1825". Tufts Digital Library, Tufts University. Archived from the original on January 29, 2015.
- Dubin, Michael J. (March 1, 1998). 1788 United States Congressional Elections-1997: The Official Results of the Elections of the 1st Through 105th Congresses. McFarland and Company. ISBN 978-0786402830.
- Martis, Kenneth C. (January 1, 1989). The Historical Atlas of Political Parties in the United States Congress, 1789-1989. Macmillan Publishing Company. ISBN 978-0029201701.
- "Party Divisions of the House of Representatives* 1789–Present". Office of the Historian, United States House of Representatives.
- Mapping Early American Elections project team (2019). "Mapping Early American Elections". Roy Rosenzweig Center for History and New Media, George Mason University.
