= List of elections in 1810 =

The following elections occurred in the year 1810.

== Europe ==
- 1810 Spanish general election

== North America ==
=== United States ===
- 1810 United States elections

==== United States lieutenant gubernatorial ====
- 1810 Connecticut lieutenant gubernatorial election

==== United States gubernatorial ====
- 1810 Connecticut gubernatorial election
- 1810 Delaware gubernatorial election
- 1810 Maryland gubernatorial election
- 1810 Massachusetts gubernatorial election
- 1810 New Hampshire gubernatorial election
- 1810 New Jersey gubernatorial election
- 1810 New York gubernatorial election
- 1810 North Carolina gubernatorial election
- 1810 Ohio gubernatorial election
- 1810 Rhode Island gubernatorial election
- 1810 South Carolina gubernatorial election
- 1810 Vermont gubernatorial election
- 1810 Virginia gubernatorial election

==== United States Senate ====
- 1810 and 1811 United States Senate elections

==== United States House of Representatives ====
- 1810 and 1811 United States House of Representatives elections
- 1810 United States House of Representatives election in Connecticut
- 1810 Connecticut's at-large congressional district special election
- 1810 United States House of Representatives election in Delaware
- 1810 United States House of Representatives election in Georgia
- 1810 United States House of Representatives elections in Kentucky
- 1810 United States House of Representatives elections in Maryland
- 1810 Maryland's 4th congressional district special election
- 1810 Maryland's 7th congressional district special election
- 1810 United States House of Representatives elections in Massachusetts
- 1810 Massachusetts' 10th congressional district special election
- 1810 Massachusetts's 11th congressional district special election
- 1810 United States House of Representatives election in New Hampshire
- 1810 United States House of Representatives election in New Jersey
- 1810 New Jersey's at-large congressional district special election
- 1810 United States House of Representatives elections in New York
- 1810 New York's 2nd congressional district special election
- 1810 United States House of Representatives elections in North Carolina
- 1810 United States House of Representatives elections in Ohio
- 1810 United States House of Representatives elections in Pennsylvania
- 1810 United States House of Representatives elections in South Carolina
- 1810 United States House of Representatives election in Vermont

== See also ==
- Category:1810 elections
