= 11th United States Congress =

1809-1811 meeting of U.S. legislature

←	10th	12th	→
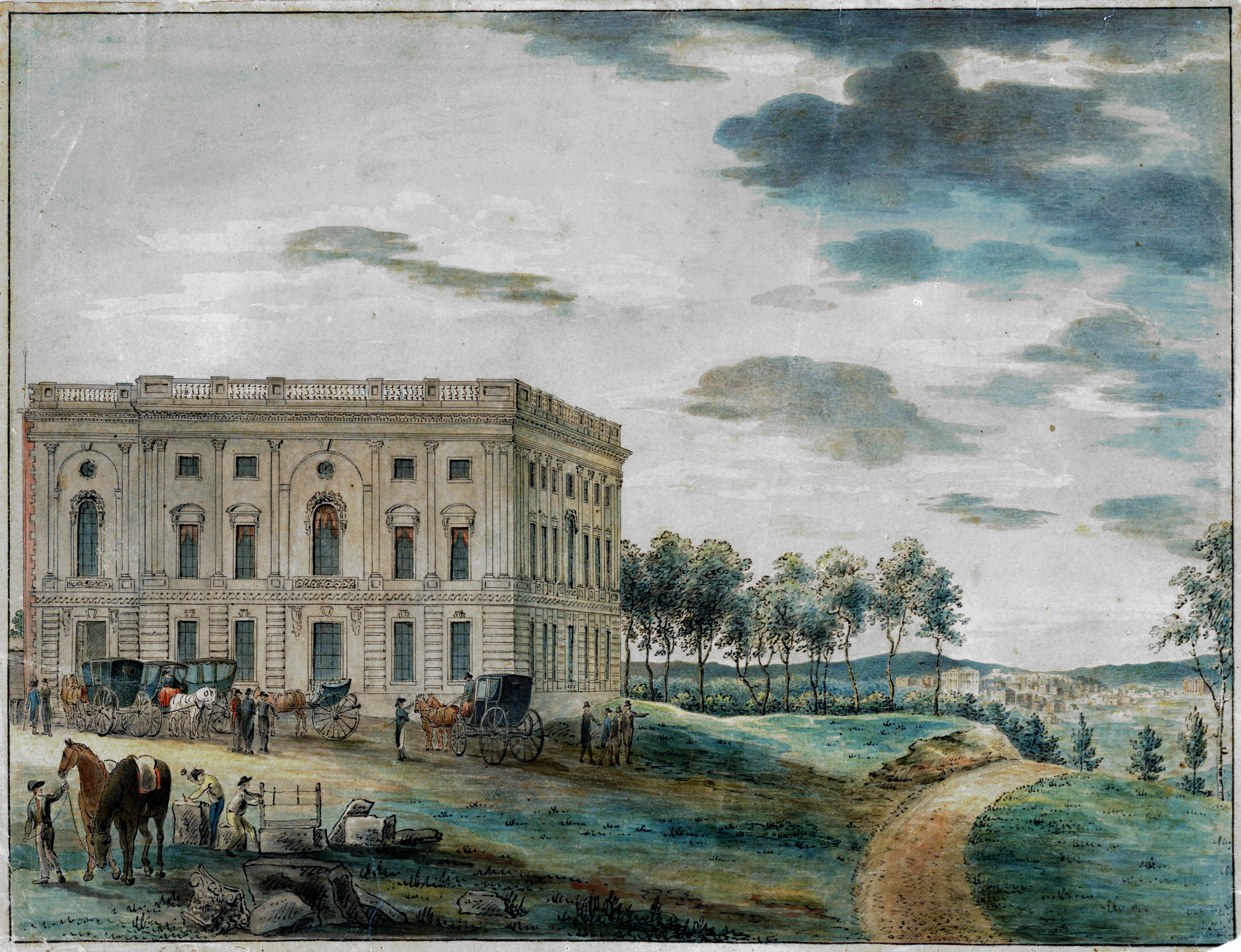
- United States Capitol (1800)

Overview
- Legislative body: United States Congress
- Jurisdiction: United States
- Term: March 4, 1809 – March 4, 1811

Senate
- Members: 34
- President: George Clinton (DR)
- President pro tempore: John Milledge (DR); Andrew Gregg (DR); John Gaillard (DR); John Pope (DR)
- Party control: Democratic-Republican

House of Representatives
- Members: 142 representatives 3 non-voting delegates
- Speaker: Joseph Bradley Varnum (DR)
- Party control: Democratic-Republican

Sessions
- Special (Note: Special session of the Senate.): March 4, 1809 – March 7, 1809
- 1st: May 22, 1809 – June 28, 1809
- 2nd: November 27, 1809 – May 1, 1810
- 3rd: December 3, 1810 – March 3, 1811

The 11th United States Congress was a meeting of the legislative branch of the United States federal government, consisting of the United States Senate and the United States House of Representatives. It met in Washington, D.C., from March 4, 1809, to March 4, 1811, during the first two years of James Madison's presidency. The apportionment of seats in the House of Representatives was based on the 1800 United States census. Both chambers had a Democratic-Republican majority.

== Major events ==
- March 4, 1809: James Madison became President of the United States
- October 27, 1810: Annexation of West Florida from Spain

== Major legislation ==
- May 1, 1810: Macon's Bill Number 2, ch. 39, 2 Stat. 605

== Constitutional amendments ==
- May 1, 1810: Approved an amendment to the United States Constitution that would strip United States citizenship from any citizen who accepted a title of nobility from a foreign country, and submitted it to the state legislatures for ratification 2 Stat. 613
  - This amendment, commonly known as the Titles of Nobility Amendment, has not been ratified and is still pending before the states.

== Party summary ==
The count below identifies party affiliations at the beginning of the first session of this congress. Changes resulting from subsequent replacements are shown below in the "Changes in membership" section.

=== Senate ===
	Party (shading shows control)		Total	Vacant
	Democratic- Republican (DR)	Federalist (F)	Total	Vacant
End of previous congress	28	6	34	0
Begin	26	7	33	1
End	26	8	34	0
Final voting share	76.5%	23.5%		
Beginning of next congress	28	6	34	0

=== House of Representatives ===
	Party (shading shows control)		Total	Vacant
	Democratic- Republican (DR)	Federalist (F)	Total	Vacant
End of previous congress	115	27	142	0
Begin	93	49	142	0
End	93	48	141	1
Final voting share	66.0%	34.0%		
Beginning of next congress	106	36	142	0

== Leadership ==
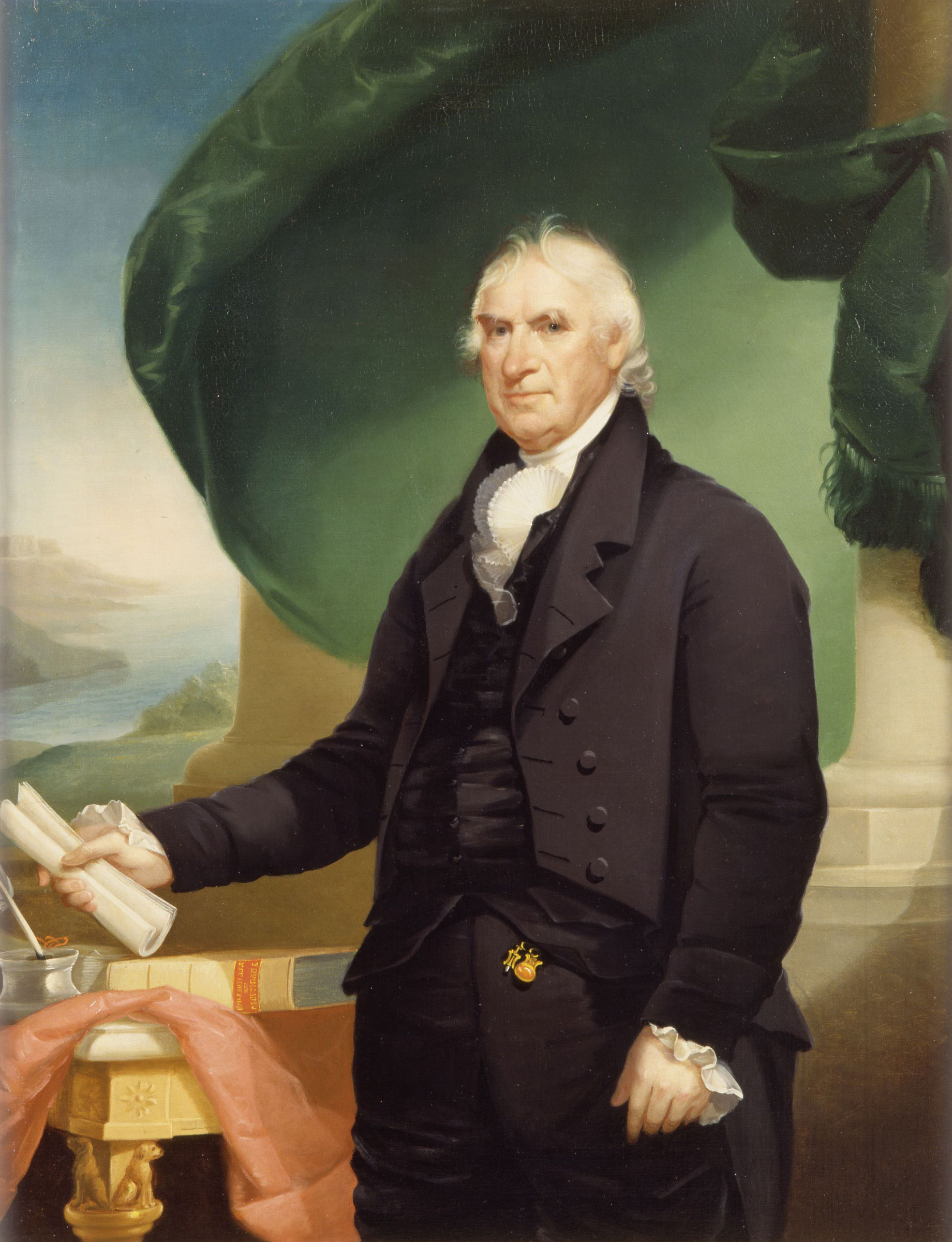
President of the Senate George Clinton (as painted in 1814)

=== Senate ===
- President: George Clinton (DR)
- President pro tempore: John Milledge (DR)
  - Andrew Gregg (DR), from June 26, 1809
  - John Gaillard (DR), from February 28, 1810
  - John Pope (DR), from February 23, 1811

=== House of Representatives ===
- Speaker: Joseph Bradley Varnum (DR)

== Members ==
This list is arranged by chamber, then by state. Senators are listed by class, and representatives are listed by district.

Skip to House of Representatives, below

=== Senate ===
Senators were elected by the state legislatures every two years, with one-third beginning new six-year terms with each Congress. Preceding the names in the list below are Senate class numbers, which indicate the cycle of their election. In this Congress, Class 1 meant their term began with this Congress, requiring re-election in 1814; Class 2 meant their term ended with this Congress, requiring re-election in 1810; and Class 3 meant their term began in the last Congress, requiring re-election in 1812.

==== Connecticut ====
▌1. James Hillhouse (F), until June 10, 1810

▌Samuel W. Dana (F), from December 4, 1810

▌3. Chauncey Goodrich (F)

==== Delaware ====
▌1. Samuel White (F), until November 4, 1809

▌Outerbridge Horsey (F), from January 12, 1810

▌2. James A. Bayard (F)

==== Georgia ====
▌2. William H. Crawford (DR)
▌3. John Milledge (DR), until November 14, 1809

▌Charles Tait (DR), from November 27, 1809

==== Kentucky ====
▌2. Buckner Thruston (DR), until December 18, 1809

▌Henry Clay (DR), from November 4, 1810

▌3. John Pope (DR)

==== Maryland ====
▌1. Samuel Smith (DR)
▌3. Philip Reed (DR)

==== Massachusetts ====
▌1. James Lloyd (F)
▌2. Timothy Pickering (F)

==== New Hampshire ====
▌2. Nicholas Gilman (DR)
▌3. Nahum Parker (DR), until June 1, 1810

▌Charles Cutts (F), from June 21, 1810

==== New Jersey ====
▌1. John Lambert (DR)
▌2. Aaron Kitchell (DR), until March 12, 1809

▌John Condit (DR), from March 21, 1809

==== New York ====
▌1. Obadiah German (DR)
▌3. John Smith (DR)

==== North Carolina ====
▌2. James Turner (DR)
▌3. Jesse Franklin (DR)

==== Ohio ====
▌1. Return J. Meigs Jr. (DR), until December 10, 1810, or before

▌Thomas Worthington (DR), from December 15, 1810

▌3. Stanley Griswold (DR), May 18, 1809 – December 11, 1809

▌Alexander Campbell (DR), from December 11, 1809

==== Pennsylvania ====
▌1. Michael Leib (DR)
▌3. Andrew Gregg (DR)

==== Rhode Island ====
▌1. Francis Malbone (F), until June 4, 1809

▌Christopher G. Champlin (F), from June 26, 1809

▌2. Elisha Mathewson (DR)

==== South Carolina ====
▌2. Thomas Sumter (DR), until December 16, 1810

▌John Taylor (DR), from December 31, 1810

▌3. John Gaillard (DR)

==== Tennessee ====
▌1. Joseph Anderson (DR)
▌2. Daniel Smith (DR), until March 31, 1809

▌Jenkin Whiteside (DR), from April 11, 1809

==== Vermont ====
▌1. Jonathan Robinson (DR)
▌3. Stephen R. Bradley (DR)

==== Virginia ====
▌1. Richard Brent (DR)
▌2. William B. Giles (DR)

Senators' party membership by state at the opening of the 11th Congress in March 1809. 2 Democratic-Republicans 1 Democratic-Republican and 1 Federalist 2 Federalists

=== House of Representatives ===
The names of representatives are preceded by their districts.

==== Connecticut ====
All representatives were elected statewide on a general ticket.

▌At-large. Epaphroditus Champion (F)
▌At-large. Samuel W. Dana (F), until May 10, 1810

▌Ebenezer Huntington (F), from October 11, 1810

▌At-large. John Davenport (F)
▌At-large. Jonathan O. Moseley (F)
▌At-large. Timothy Pitkin (F)
▌At-large. Lewis B. Sturges (F)
▌At-large. Benjamin Tallmadge (F)

==== Delaware ====
▌At-large. Nicholas Van Dyke (F)

==== Georgia ====
▌At-large. William W. Bibb (DR)
▌At-large. Howell Cobb (DR)
▌At-large. Dennis Smelt (DR)
▌At-large. George Troup (DR)

==== Kentucky ====
▌1. Matthew Lyon (DR)
▌2. Samuel McKee (DR)
▌3. Henry Crist (DR)
▌4. Richard Mentor Johnson (DR)
▌5. Benjamin Howard (DR), until April 10, 1810

▌William T. Barry (DR), from August 8, 1810

▌6. Joseph Desha (DR)

==== Maryland ====
The 5th district was a plural district with two representatives.

▌1. John Campbell (F)
▌2. Archibald Van Horne (DR)
▌3. Philip Barton Key (F)
▌4. Roger Nelson (DR), until May 14, 1810

▌Samuel Ringgold (DR), from October 15, 1810

▌5. Alexander McKim (DR)
▌5. Nicholas R. Moore (DR)
▌6. John Montgomery (DR)
▌7. John Brown (DR), until sometime in 1810 ([data missing])

▌Robert Wright (DR), from November 29, 1810

▌8. Charles Goldsborough (F)

==== Massachusetts ====
▌1. Josiah Quincy III (F)
▌2. Benjamin Pickman Jr. (F)
▌3. Edward St. Loe Livermore (F)
▌4. Joseph Bradley Varnum (DR)
▌5. William Ely (F)
▌6. Samuel Taggart (F)
▌7. William Baylies (F), until June 28, 1809

▌Charles Turner Jr. (DR), from June 28, 1809

▌8. Gideon Gardner (DR)
▌9. Laban Wheaton (F)
▌10. Jabez Upham (F), until sometime in 1810 ([data missing])

▌Joseph Allen (F), from October 8, 1810

▌11. William Stedman (F), until July 16, 1810

▌Abijah Bigelow (F), from October 8, 1810

▌12. Ezekiel Bacon (DR)
▌13. Ebenezer Seaver (DR)
▌14. Richard Cutts (DR)
▌15. Ezekiel Whitman (F)
▌16. Orchard Cook (DR)
▌17. Barzillai Gannett (DR)

==== New Hampshire ====
▌At-large. Daniel Blaisdell (F)
▌At-large. John C. Chamberlain (F)
▌At-large. William Hale (F)
▌At-large. Nathaniel Appleton Haven (F)
▌At-large. James Wilson (F)

==== New Jersey ====
▌At-large. Adam Boyd (DR)
▌At-large. James Cox (DR), until September 12, 1810

▌John A. Scudder (DR), from October 31, 1810

▌At-large. William Helms (DR)
▌At-large. Jacob Hufty (DR)
▌At-large. Thomas Newbold (DR)
▌At-large. Henry Southard (DR)

==== New York ====
There were two plural districts, the 2nd & 6th, each had two representatives.

▌1. Ebenezer Sage (DR)
▌2. William Denning (DR), until sometime before late April 1810

▌Samuel L. Mitchill (DR), from December 4, 1810

▌2. Gurdon S. Mumford (DR)
▌3. Jonathan Fisk (DR)
▌4. James Emott (F)
▌5. Barent Gardenier (F)
▌6. Herman Knickerbocker (F)
▌6. Robert Le Roy Livingston (F)
▌7. Killian K. Van Rensselaer (F)
▌8. John Thompson (DR)
▌9. Thomas Sammons (F)
▌10. John Nicholson (DR)
▌11. Thomas R. Gold (F)
▌12. Erastus Root (DR)
▌13. Uri Tracy (DR)
▌14. Vincent Mathews (F)
▌15. Peter Buell Porter (DR)

==== North Carolina ====
▌1. Lemuel Sawyer (DR)
▌2. Willis Alston (DR)
▌3. William Kennedy (DR)
▌4. John Stanly (F)
▌5. Thomas Kenan (DR)
▌6. Nathaniel Macon (DR)
▌7. Archibald McBryde (F)
▌8. Richard Stanford (DR)
▌9. James Cochran (DR)
▌10. Joseph Pearson (F)
▌11. James Holland (DR)
▌12. Meshack Franklin (DR)

==== Ohio ====
▌At-large. Jeremiah Morrow (DR)

==== Pennsylvania ====
There were four plural districts: the 1st, 2nd, and 3rd had three representatives each, and the 4th had two representatives.

▌1. William Anderson (DR)
▌1. John Porter (DR)
▌1. Benjamin Say (DR), until sometime in June 1809 ([data missing])

▌Adam Seybert (DR), from October 10, 1809

▌2. Robert Brown (DR)
▌2. William Milnor (F)
▌2. John Ross (DR)
▌3. Daniel Hiester (DR)
▌3. Robert Jenkins (F)
▌3. Matthias Richards (DR)
▌4. David Bard (DR)
▌4. Robert Whitehill (DR)
▌5. George Smith (DR)
▌6. William Crawford (DR)
▌7. John Rea (DR)
▌8. William Findley (DR)
▌9. John Smilie (DR)
▌10. Aaron Lyle (DR)
▌11. Samuel Smith (DR)

==== Rhode Island ====
Both representatives were elected statewide on a general ticket.

▌At-large. Richard Jackson Jr. (F)
▌At-large. Elisha Reynolds Potter (F)

==== South Carolina ====
▌1. Robert Marion (DR), until December 4, 1810

▌Langdon Cheves (DR), from December 31, 1810

▌2. William Butler Sr. (DR)
▌3. Robert Witherspoon (DR)
▌4. John Taylor (DR), until December 30, 1810, vacant thereafter
▌5. Richard Winn (DR)
▌6. Joseph Calhoun (DR)
▌7. Thomas Moore (DR)
▌8. Lemuel J. Alston (DR)

==== Tennessee ====
▌1. John Rhea (DR)
▌2. Robert Weakley (DR)
▌3. Pleasant Moorman Miller (DR)

==== Vermont ====
▌1. Samuel Shaw (DR)
▌2. Jonathan H. Hubbard (F)
▌3. William Chamberlain (F)
▌4. Martin Chittenden (F)

==== Virginia ====
▌1. John G. Jackson (DR), until September 28, 1810

▌William McKinley (DR), from December 21, 1810

▌2. James Stephenson (F)
▌3. John Smith (DR)
▌4. Jacob Swoope (F)
▌5. James Breckinridge (F)
▌6. Daniel Sheffey (F)
▌7. Joseph Lewis Jr. (F)
▌8. Walter Jones (DR)
▌9. John Love (DR)
▌10. John Dawson (DR)
▌11. John Roane (DR)
▌12. Burwell Bassett (DR)
▌13. William A. Burwell (DR)
▌14. Matthew Clay (DR)
▌15. John Randolph (DR)
▌16. John W. Eppes (DR)
▌17. Thomas Gholson Jr. (DR)
▌18. Peterson Goodwyn (DR)
▌19. Edwin Gray (DR)
▌20. Thomas Newton Jr. (DR)
▌21. Wilson Cary Nicholas (DR), until November 27, 1809

▌David S. Garland (DR), from January 17, 1810

▌22. John Clopton (DR)

==== Non-voting members ====
Indiana Territory. Jonathan Jennings, from November 27, 1809
Mississippi Territory. George Poindexter
Orleans Territory. Julien de Lallande Poydras

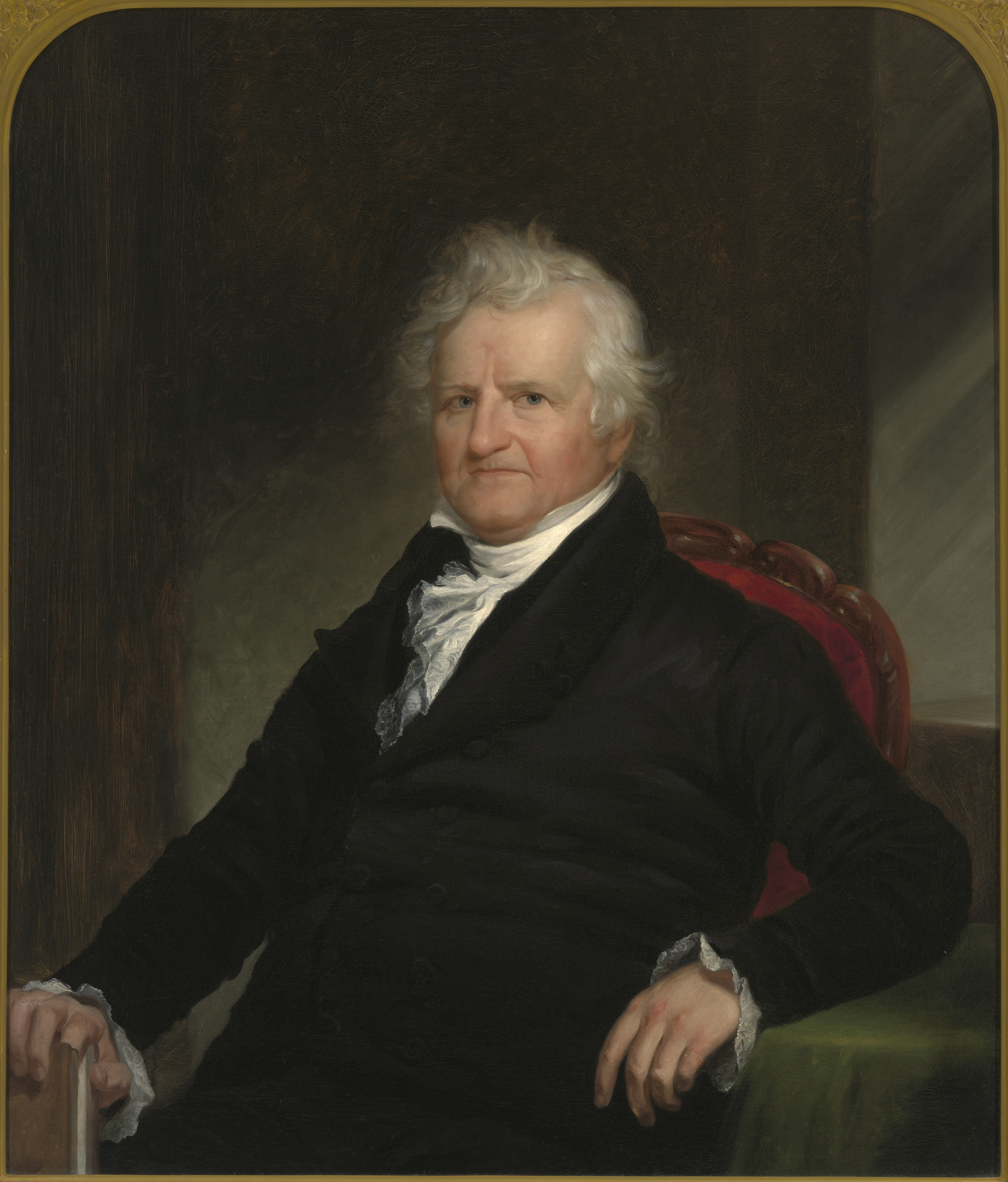
Speaker of the House Joseph Bradley Varnum

== Changes in membership ==
The count below reflects changes from the beginning of the first session of this Congress.

=== Senate ===
There were 8 resignations, 2 deaths, 1 interim appointment, and 1 vacancy from before this Congress.

Senate changes
State (class)	Vacated by	Reason for change	Successor	Date of successor's formal installation (Note: When seated or oath administered, not necessarily when service began.)
Ohio (3)	Vacant	Edward Tiffin (DR) resigned at the end of the previous Congress. Successor was appointed to continue the term.	Stanley Griswold (DR)	Seated May 18, 1809
New Jersey (2)	Aaron Kitchell (DR)	Resigned March 12, 1809. Successor was appointed to continue the term and subsequently elected to finish the term.	John Condit (DR)	Seated March 21, 1809
Tennessee (2)	Daniel Smith (DR)	Resigned March 31, 1809. Successor was elected April 11, 1809, to finish the term.	Jenkin Whiteside (DR)	Seated April 11, 1809
Rhode Island (1)	Francis Malbone (F)	Died June 4, 1809. Successor was elected to finish the term.	Christopher G. Champlin (F)	Seated June 26, 1809
Delaware (1)	Samuel White (F)	Died November 4, 1809. Successor was appointed to continue the term and subsequently elected to finish the term.	Outerbridge Horsey (F)	Seated January 12, 1810
Georgia (3)	John Milledge (DR)	Resigned November 14, 1809. Successor was elected to finish the term.	Charles Tait (DR)	Seated November 27, 1809
Ohio (3)	Stanley Griswold (DR)	Appointee was not elected to finish the term. Successor elected December 11, 1809.	Alexander Campbell (DR)	Seated December 11, 1809
Kentucky (2)	Buckner Thruston (DR)	Appointed judge of the US District Court of the District of Columbia December 18, 1809	Henry Clay (DR)	Seated November 4, 1810
New Hampshire (3)	Nahum Parker (DR)	Resigned June 1, 1810	Charles Cutts (F)	Seated June 21, 1810
Connecticut (1)	James Hillhouse (F)	Resigned June 10, 1810	Samuel W. Dana (F)	Seated December 4, 1810
Ohio (1)	Return J. Meigs Jr. (DR)	Resigned on or before December 10, 1810, to become Governor of Ohio	Thomas Worthington (DR)	Seated December 15, 1810
South Carolina (2)	Thomas Sumter (DR)	Resigned December 16, 1810	John Taylor (DR)	Seated December 31, 1810

=== House of Representatives ===
Of the voting members, there were 12 resignations, 1 death, and 1 change due to a contested election.

House changes
District	Vacated by	Reason for change	Successor	Date of successor's formal installation
Indiana Territory	Vacant	failure to elect	Jonathan Jennings	Seated November 27, 1809
Pennsylvania; 1st	Benjamin Say (DR)	Resigned June, 1809	Adam Seybert (DR)	Seated October 10, 1809
Massachusetts; 7th	William Baylies (F)	Lost contested election June 28, 1809	Charles Turner Jr. (DR)	June 28, 1809
Virginia; 21st	Wilson Cary Nicholas (DR)	Resigned November 27, 1809	David S. Garland (DR)	Seated January 17, 1810
Maryland; 7th	John Brown (DR)	Resigned sometime in 1810	Robert Wright (DR)	Seated November 29, 1810
Massachusetts; 10th	Jabez Upham (F)	Resigned sometime in 1810	Joseph Allen (F)	October 8, 1810
New York; 2nd	William Denning (DR)	Resigned sometime in 1810	Samuel L. Mitchill (DR)	December 4, 1810
Kentucky; 5th	Benjamin Howard (DR)	Resigned April 10, 1810, after becoming Governor of Louisiana Territory	William T. Barry (DR)	Seated August 8, 1810
Connecticut at-large	Samuel W. Dana (F)	Resigned May 10, 1810, after being elected to US Senate	Ebenezer Huntington (F)	October 11, 1810
Maryland; 4th	Roger Nelson (DR)	Resigned May 14, 1810	Samuel Ringgold (DR)	Seated October 15, 1810
Massachusetts; 11th	William Stedman (F)	Resigned July 16, 1810	Abijah Bigelow (F)	October 8, 1810
New Jersey at-large	James Cox (DR)	Died September 12, 1810	John A. Scudder (DR)	Seated October 31, 1810
Virginia; 1st	John G. Jackson (DR)	Resigned September 28, 1810	William McKinley (DR)	Seated December 21, 1810
South Carolina; 1st	Robert Marion (DR)	Resigned December 4, 1810	Langdon Cheves (DR)	Seated December 31, 1810
South Carolina; 4th	John Taylor (DR)	Resigned December 30, 1810, after becoming US Senator	Vacant	Not filled for remainder of term

== Committees ==
Lists of committees and their party leaders.

=== Senate ===
- Audit and Control the Contingent Expenses of the Senate (Chairman: N/A)
- Engrossed Bills (Chairman: Nicholas Gilman)
- National University (Chairman: N/A)
- Whole

=== House of Representatives ===
- Accounts (Chairman: Nicholas R. Moore then William Milnor then Nicholas R. Moore)
- Arms Exports (Select)
- Claims (Chairman: Richard M. Johnson then Erastus Root)
- Commerce and Manufactures (Chairman: Thomas Newton Jr.)
- District of Columbia (Chairman: John Love then Archibald Van Horne)
- Elections (Chairman: William Findley)
- Post Office and Post Roads (Chairman: John Rhea)
- Public Lands (Chairman: Jeremiah Morrow)
- Revisal and Unfinished Business (Chairman: Henry Southard)
- Rules (Select)
- Standards of Official Conduct
- Ways and Means (Chairman: John W. Eppes)
- Whole

=== Joint committees ===
- Enrolled Bills (Chairman: James Turner)
- The Library (Chairman: N/A)

== Employees ==
=== Legislative branch agency directors ===
- Architect of the Capitol: Benjamin Latrobe
- Librarian of Congress: Patrick Magruder

=== Senate ===
- Chaplain: James J. Wilmer (Episcopalian), until December 5, 1809
  - Obadiah B. Brown (Baptist), from December 5, 1809
  - Walter D. Addison (Episcopalian), from December 12, 1810
- Secretary: Samuel A. Otis
- Sergeant at Arms: James Mathers

=== House of Representatives ===
- Chaplain: Robert Elliott, Baptist, until May 27, 1809
  - Jesse Lee, Methodist, from May 27, 1809
- Clerk: Patrick Magruder
- Doorkeeper: Thomas Claxton
- Sergeant at Arms: Thomas Dunn

== See also ==
- 1808 United States elections (elections leading to this Congress)
  - 1808 United States presidential election
  - 1808–09 United States Senate elections
  - 1808–09 United States House of Representatives elections
- 1810 United States elections (elections during this Congress, leading to the next Congress)
  - 1810–11 United States Senate elections
  - 1810–11 United States House of Representatives elections
