= 1806 Maryland's 7th congressional district special election =

A special election was held in Maryland's 7th congressional district on September 27 and October 4, 1806 to fill a vacancy left by the resignation of Joseph H. Nicholson (DR)

== Election results ==
Candidate	Party	Votes	Percent
Edward Lloyd	Democratic-Republican	1,237	83.8%
James Brown	Quid	240	16.2%

Lloyd took his seat in the 9th Congress on December 3, 1806, two days after the start of the 2nd session of the 9th Congress

== See also ==
- List of special elections to the United States House of Representatives
