= 1810 Maryland's 7th congressional district special election =

A special election was held in Maryland's 7th congressional district to fill a vacancy left by the resignation of John Brown (DR) to accept a position as clerk of the county court of Queen Anne's County. Brown had earlier been re-elected to the 12th Congress, thus, his resignation created vacancies in both the 11th and 12th Congresses. Unusually, a single ballot was used for both vacancies. This was the first of at least three examples of this sort of dual-vacancy being filled with one ballot.

== Election results ==
| Candidate | Party | Votes | Percent |
|---|---|---|---|
| Robert Wright | Democratic-Republican | 650 | 51.7% |
| Daniel C. Hopper | | 566 | 45.0% |
| James Brown | | 39 | 3.1% |

Robert Wright took his seat December 3, 1810 at the start of the Third Session of the 11th Congress.

== See also ==
- List of special elections to the United States House of Representatives
