= William Hayward Jr. =

American politician

Member of the U.S. House of Representatives from Maryland's 7th district
- In office March 4, 1823 – March 3, 1825
- Preceded by: Robert Wright
- Succeeded by: John Leeds Kerr

Personal details
- Born: 1787 near Easton, Maryland
- Died: October 19, 1836 (aged 48–49) Easton, Maryland
- Party: Democratic-Republican Party
- Education: Princeton College

William Hayward Jr. (1787 – October 19, 1836) was an American politician. Born at Shipshead, near Easton, Maryland, Hayward attended Easton Academy and graduated from Princeton College in 1808. He studied law, was admitted to the bar in 1809, and commenced practice in Easton. He served as a member of the Maryland House of Delegates from 1818 to 1820, and was elected as a Crawford Republican to the Eighteenth Congress from the seventh congressional district of Maryland. He served one term from March 4, 1823, to March 3, 1825. Afterwards, he continued the practice of law in Easton until his death there. He is interred in the family burial ground on his estate, Shipshead.

U.S. House of Representatives
Preceded by Robert Wright	Member of the U.S. House of Representatives from Maryland's 7th congressional district 1823–1825	Succeeded by John Leeds Kerr
