= Thomas Lowndes (politician) =

American politician

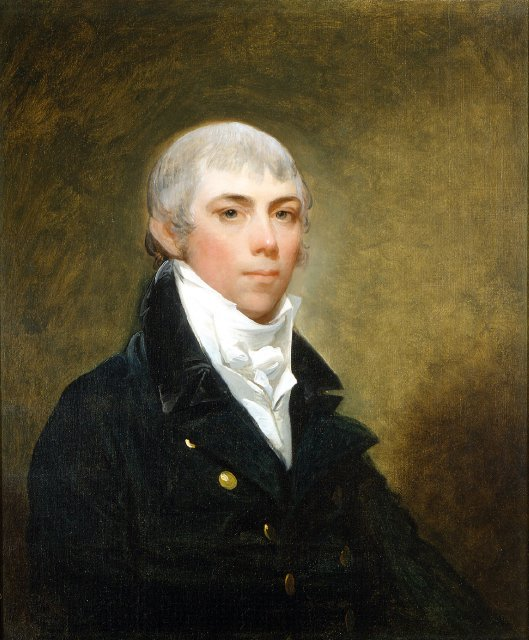
- Portrait by Gilbert Stuart

Member of the U.S. House of Representatives from South Carolina's 1st district
- In office March 4, 1801 – March 3, 1805
- Preceded by: Thomas Pinckney
- Succeeded by: Robert Marion

Member of the South Carolina House of Representatives from St. Philip's and St. Michael's Parish
- In office November 26, 1792 – December 21, 1799

Personal details
- Born: January 22, 1766 Charleseton, Province of South Carolina, British America
- Died: July 8, 1843 (aged 77) Charleston, South Carolina, U.S.
- Party: Federalist

Thomas Lowndes (January 22, 1766 – July 8, 1843) was an American planter, lawyer and politician from Charleston, South Carolina. He was the son of Rawlins Lowndes, governor of South Carolina during the American Revolutionary War and half-brother of William Lowndes, who helped secure the declaration of the War of 1812. Educated in Charleston, he studied law there and became a practicing lawyer in the city in the late 18th century. He was a member of the state legislature from 1792 to 1799. He represented South Carolina's 1st Congressional District in the U.S. Congress from March 4, 1801, to March 3, 1805. He was not re-elected in 1804. He failed to win back his seat in 1808, and retired from public life thereafter. He died in Charleston on July 8, 1843.

U.S. House of Representatives
Preceded by Thomas Pinckney	Member of the U.S. House of Representatives from South Carolina's 1st congressional district 1801–1805	Succeeded by Robert Marion
