= Maryland's 7th congressional district =

U.S. House district for Maryland

Coordinates: 39.3°N 76.9°W

- Interactive map of district boundaries since January 3, 2023
- Representative: Kweisi Mfume; D–Baltimore
- Area: 294.25 mi^{2} (762.1 km^{2})
- Distribution: 95% urban; 5% rural
- Population (2025): 752,711
- Median household income: $66,340
- Ethnicity: 53.2% Black; 29.9% White; 8.5% Hispanic; 3.9% Two or more races; 3.7% Asian; 0.8% other
- Occupation: 66.8% White-collar; 17% Gray-collar; 16.2% Blue-collar
- Cook PVI: D+31

Maryland's 7th congressional district of the United States House of Representatives encompasses almost the entire city of Baltimore, and some of Baltimore County. The district was created following the census of 1790, which gave Maryland one additional representative in the House. It was abolished in 1843, but was restored in 1950 as a west Baltimore district. It has been drawn as a majority-African American district since 1973. Democrat Kweisi Mfume is the current representative, winning a special election on April 28, 2020, to finish the term of Elijah Cummings, who died in October 2019. Mfume had previously held the seat from 1987 to 1996.

== Recent election results from statewide races ==
Year	Office	Results
2008	President	Obama 81% – 17%
2012	President	Obama 84% – 16%
2012	Senate	Cardin 72% – 10%
2014	Governor	Brown 68% – 32%
2016	President	Clinton 78% – 18%
2016	Senate	Van Hollen 77% – 18%
2018	Senate	Cardin 81% – 15%
2018	Governor	Jealous 61% – 38%
2018	Attorney General	Frosh 81% – 19%
2020	President	Biden 81% – 17%
2022	Senate	Van Hollen 83% – 16%
2022	Governor	Moore 81% – 15%
2022	Comptroller	Lierman 80% – 20%
2022	Attorney General	Brown 83% – 17%
2024	President	Harris 78% – 19%
2024	Senate	Alsobrooks 73% – 25%

== Composition ==
For the 118th and successive Congresses (based on redistricting following the 2020 census), the district contains all or portions of the following counties and communities:

Baltimore County (10)

Arbutus, Baltimore Highlands, Catonsville (part; also 2nd), Dundalk, Edgemere, Lansdowne, Lochearn, Milford Mill (part; also 2nd), Rosedale (part; also 2nd), Woodlawn (part; also 2nd)

Independent cities (1)

Baltimore (most; also 2nd)

== List of members representing the district ==
Member	Party	Years	Con- gress	Electoral history	District location
District created March 4, 1793
William Hindman (Talbot County)	Pro-Administration	March 4, 1793 – March 3, 1795	3rd 4th 5th	Redistricted from the 2nd district, and re-elected in 1792. Re-elected in 1794. Re-elected in 1796. Lost re-election.	1793–1803 [data missing]
William Hindman (Talbot County)	Federalist	March 4, 1795 – March 3, 1799	3rd 4th 5th	Redistricted from the 2nd district, and re-elected in 1792. Re-elected in 1794. Re-elected in 1796. Lost re-election.	1793–1803 [data missing]
Joseph H. Nicholson (Chestertown)	Democratic-Republican	March 4, 1799 – March 1, 1806	6th 7th 8th 9th	Elected November 29, 1798 to begin member-elect Joshua Seney's term. Re-elected in 1801. Re-elected in 1803. Re-elected in 1804. Resigned.	1793–1803 [data missing]
Joseph H. Nicholson (Chestertown)	Democratic-Republican	March 4, 1799 – March 1, 1806	6th 7th 8th 9th	Elected November 29, 1798 to begin member-elect Joshua Seney's term. Re-elected in 1801. Re-elected in 1803. Re-elected in 1804. Resigned.	1803–1813 [data missing]
Vacant		March 1, 1806 – December 3, 1806	9th		1803–1813 [data missing]
Edward Lloyd (Wye Mills)	Democratic-Republican	December 3, 1806 – March 3, 1809	9th 10th	Elected September 27 and October 4, 1806, to finish Nicholson's term. Re-elected October 6, 1806. Re-elected in 1808. Retired.	1803–1813 [data missing]
John Brown (Centerville)	Democratic-Republican	March 4, 1809 – ??, 1810	11th	Elected in 1808. Re-elected in 1810. Resigned to become Clerk of Court of Queen Anne's County.	1803–1813 [data missing]
Vacant		??, 1810 – November 29, 1810	11th		1803–1813 [data missing]
Robert Wright (Queenstown)	Democratic-Republican	November 29, 1810 – March 3, 1817	11th 12th 13th 14th	Elected to finish Brown's term and to the next term on the same ballot. Re-elected in 1812. Re-elected in 1814. Retired.	1803–1813 [data missing]
Robert Wright (Queenstown)	Democratic-Republican	November 29, 1810 – March 3, 1817	11th 12th 13th 14th	Elected to finish Brown's term and to the next term on the same ballot. Re-elected in 1812. Re-elected in 1814. Retired.	1813–1823 [data missing]
Thomas Culbreth (Denton)	Democratic-Republican	March 4, 1817 – March 3, 1821	15th 16th	Elected in 1816. Re-elected in 1818. Lost re-election.	1813–1823 [data missing]
Robert Wright (Queenstown)	Democratic-Republican	March 4, 1821 – March 3, 1823	17th	Elected in 1820. Retired.	1813–1823 [data missing]
William Hayward Jr. (Easton)	Democratic-Republican (Crawford)	March 4, 1823 – March 3, 1825	18th	Elected in 1822. Retired.	1823–1833 [data missing]
John Leeds Kerr (Easton)	Anti-Jacksonian	March 4, 1825 – March 3, 1829	19th 20th	Elected in 1824. Re-elected in 1826. Lost re-election.	1823–1833 [data missing]
Richard Spencer (Easton)	Jacksonian	March 4, 1829 – March 3, 1831	21st	Elected in 1829. Lost re-election.	1823–1833 [data missing]
John Leeds Kerr (Easton)	Anti-Jacksonian	March 4, 1831 – March 3, 1833	22nd	Elected in 1831. [data missing]	1823–1833 [data missing]
Francis Thomas (Frederick)	Jacksonian	March 4, 1833 – March 3, 1835	23rd	Redistricted from the 4th district and re-elected in 1833. Redistricted to the 6th district.	1833–1843 [data missing]
Daniel Jenifer (Milton Hill)	Anti-Jacksonian	March 4, 1835 – March 3, 1837	24th	Elected in 1835. Re-elected in 1837. Re-elected in 1839. [data missing]	1833–1843 [data missing]
Daniel Jenifer (Milton Hill)	Whig	March 4, 1837 – March 3, 1841	25th 26th	Elected in 1835. Re-elected in 1837. Re-elected in 1839. [data missing]	1833–1843 [data missing]
Augustus R. Sollers (Prince Frederick)	Whig	March 4, 1841 – March 3, 1843	27th	Elected in 1841. [data missing]	1833–1843 [data missing]
Seat eliminated after the 1840 census.
Seat re-created after the 1950 census.
Samuel Friedel (Baltimore)	Democratic	January 3, 1953 – January 3, 1971	83rd 84th 85th 86th 87th 88th 89th 90th 91st	Elected in 1952. Re-elected in 1954. Re-elected in 1956. Re-elected in 1958. Re-elected in 1960. Re-elected in 1962. Re-elected in 1964. Re-elected in 1966. Re-elected in 1968. Lost re-nomination.	1953–1963 [data missing]
Samuel Friedel (Baltimore)	Democratic	January 3, 1953 – January 3, 1971	83rd 84th 85th 86th 87th 88th 89th 90th 91st	Elected in 1952. Re-elected in 1954. Re-elected in 1956. Re-elected in 1958. Re-elected in 1960. Re-elected in 1962. Re-elected in 1964. Re-elected in 1966. Re-elected in 1968. Lost re-nomination.	1963–1973 [data missing]
Parren Mitchell (Baltimore)	Democratic	January 3, 1971 – January 3, 1987	92nd 93rd 94th 95th 96th 97th 98th 99th 100th	Elected in 1970. Re-elected in 1972. Re-elected in 1974. Re-elected in 1976. Re-elected in 1978. Re-elected in 1980. Re-elected in 1982. Re-elected in 1984. Retired to run for Lieutenant Governor of Maryland.	1963–1973 [data missing]
Parren Mitchell (Baltimore)	Democratic	January 3, 1971 – January 3, 1987	92nd 93rd 94th 95th 96th 97th 98th 99th 100th	Elected in 1970. Re-elected in 1972. Re-elected in 1974. Re-elected in 1976. Re-elected in 1978. Re-elected in 1980. Re-elected in 1982. Re-elected in 1984. Retired to run for Lieutenant Governor of Maryland.	1973–1983 [data missing]
Parren Mitchell (Baltimore)	Democratic	January 3, 1971 – January 3, 1987	92nd 93rd 94th 95th 96th 97th 98th 99th 100th	Elected in 1970. Re-elected in 1972. Re-elected in 1974. Re-elected in 1976. Re-elected in 1978. Re-elected in 1980. Re-elected in 1982. Re-elected in 1984. Retired to run for Lieutenant Governor of Maryland.	1983–1993 [data missing]
Kweisi Mfume (Baltimore)	Democratic	January 3, 1987 – February 15, 1996	101st 102nd 103rd 104th	Elected in 1986. Re-elected in 1988. Re-elected in 1990. Re-elected in 1992. Re-elected in 1994. Resigned to become CEO of the NAACP.	1983–1993 [data missing]
Kweisi Mfume (Baltimore)	Democratic	January 3, 1987 – February 15, 1996	101st 102nd 103rd 104th	Elected in 1986. Re-elected in 1988. Re-elected in 1990. Re-elected in 1992. Re-elected in 1994. Resigned to become CEO of the NAACP.	1993–2003 [data missing]
Vacant		February 15, 1996 – April 16, 1996	104th		1993–2003 [data missing]
Elijah Cummings (Baltimore)	Democratic	April 16, 1996 – October 17, 2019	104th 105th 106th 107th 108th 109th 110th 111th 112th 113th 114th 115th 116th	Elected to finish Mfume's term. Re-elected in 1996. Re-elected in 1998. Re-elected in 2000. Re-elected in 2002. Re-elected in 2004. Re-elected in 2006. Re-elected in 2008. Re-elected in 2010. Re-elected in 2012. Re-elected in 2014. Re-elected in 2016. Re-elected in 2018. Died.	1993–2003 [data missing]
Elijah Cummings (Baltimore)	Democratic	April 16, 1996 – October 17, 2019	104th 105th 106th 107th 108th 109th 110th 111th 112th 113th 114th 115th 116th	Elected to finish Mfume's term. Re-elected in 1996. Re-elected in 1998. Re-elected in 2000. Re-elected in 2002. Re-elected in 2004. Re-elected in 2006. Re-elected in 2008. Re-elected in 2010. Re-elected in 2012. Re-elected in 2014. Re-elected in 2016. Re-elected in 2018. Died.	2003–2013
Elijah Cummings (Baltimore)	Democratic	April 16, 1996 – October 17, 2019	104th 105th 106th 107th 108th 109th 110th 111th 112th 113th 114th 115th 116th	Elected to finish Mfume's term. Re-elected in 1996. Re-elected in 1998. Re-elected in 2000. Re-elected in 2002. Re-elected in 2004. Re-elected in 2006. Re-elected in 2008. Re-elected in 2010. Re-elected in 2012. Re-elected in 2014. Re-elected in 2016. Re-elected in 2018. Died.	2013–2023
Vacant		October 17, 2019 – May 5, 2020	116th		2013–2023
Kweisi Mfume (Baltimore)	Democratic	May 5, 2020 – present	116th 117th 118th 119th	Elected to finish Cummings's term and seated May 5, 2020. Re-elected in 2020. Re-elected in 2022. Re-elected in 2024. Re-elected in 2026.	2013–2023
Kweisi Mfume (Baltimore)	Democratic	May 5, 2020 – present	116th 117th 118th 119th	Elected to finish Cummings's term and seated May 5, 2020. Re-elected in 2020. Re-elected in 2022. Re-elected in 2024. Re-elected in 2026.	2023–present

== Recent elections ==
=== 2000s ===
Maryland's 7th congressional district election, 2000
Party	Candidate	Votes	%
Democratic	Elijah Cummings (Incumbent)	134,066	87.1
Republican	Kenneth Kondner	19,773	12.8
Write-ins		135	0.10
Total votes		153,974	100.00
Democratic hold			

Maryland's 7th congressional district election, 2002
Party	Candidate	Votes	%
Democratic	Elijah Cummings (Incumbent)	137,047	73.6
Republican	Joseph Ward	49,172	26.4
Total votes		186,219	100.00
Democratic hold			

Maryland's 7th congressional district election, 2004
Party	Candidate	Votes	%
Democratic	Elijah Cummings (Incumbent)	179,189	73.4
Republican	Tony Salazar	60,102	26.4
Green	Virginia Rodino	4,727	1.9
Total votes		244,018	100.00
Democratic hold			

Maryland's 7th congressional district election, 2006
Party	Candidate	Votes	%
Democratic	Elijah Cummings (Incumbent)	158,830	98.1
Write-ins		3,147	1.9
Total votes		161,977	100.00
Democratic hold			

Maryland's 7th congressional district election, 2008
Party	Candidate	Votes	%
Democratic	Elijah Cummings (Incumbent)	227,379	79.5
Republican	Michael Hargadon	53,147	18.6
Libertarian	Ronald Owens-Bey	4,727	1.8
Write-ins		280	0.1
Total votes		286,020	100.00
Democratic hold			

=== 2010s ===
Maryland's 7th congressional district election, 2010
Party	Candidate	Votes	%
Democratic	Elijah Cummings (Incumbent)	152,669	75.2
Republican	Frank Mirabile	46,375	22.8
Libertarian	Scott Spencer	3,814	1.9
Write-ins		210	0.1
Total votes		203,068	100.00
Democratic hold			

Maryland's 7th congressional district, 2012
Party	Candidate	Votes	%
Democratic	Elijah Cummings (incumbent)	247,770	76.5
Republican	Frank C. Mirabile	67,405	20.8
Libertarian	Ronald M. Owens-Bey	8,211	2.5
n/a	Write-ins	432	0.1
Total votes		323,818	100.0
Democratic hold			

Maryland's 7th congressional district, 2014
Party	Candidate	Votes	%
Democratic	Elijah Cummings (incumbent)	144,639	69.7
Republican	Corrogan R. Vaughn	55,860	27.2
Libertarian	Scott Soffen	6,103	3.0
n/a	Write-ins	207	0.1
Total votes		206,809	100.0
Democratic hold			

Maryland's 7th congressional district, 2016
Party	Candidate	Votes	%
Democratic	Elijah Cummings (incumbent)	238,838	74.9
Republican	Corrogan R. Vaughn	69,556	21.8
Green	Myles B. Hoenig	9,715	3.0
n/a	Write-ins	601	0.2
Republican	Wayne T. Newton (write-in)	202	0.1
Total votes		318,912	100.0
Democratic hold			

Maryland's 7th congressional district, 2018
Party	Candidate	Votes	%
Democratic	Elijah Cummings (incumbent)	202,345	76.4
Republican	Richmond Davis	56,266	21.3
Libertarian	David Griggs	5,827	2.2
n/a	Write-ins	272	0.1
Total votes		264,710	100.0
Democratic hold			

=== 2020s ===
Maryland's 7th congressional district special election, 2020
Party	Candidate	Votes	%
Democratic	Kweisi Mfume	111,955	73.8%
Republican	Kimberly Klacik	38,102	25.1%
Independent	Peter James (write-in)	1	0.0%
Independent	Other Write-Ins	1,660	1.1%
Total votes		151,718	100.0
Democratic hold			

Maryland's 7th congressional district, 2020
Party	Candidate	Votes	%
Democratic	Kweisi Mfume (incumbent)	237,084	71.6
Republican	Kimberly Klacik	92,825	28.0
Write-in		1,089	0.3
Total votes		330,998	100.0
Democratic hold			

Maryland's 7th congressional district, 2022
Party	Candidate	Votes	%
Democratic	Kweisi Mfume (incumbent)	151,640	82.1
Republican	Scott Collier	32,737	17.7
Write-in		424	0.2
Total votes		184,801	100.0
Democratic hold			

Maryland's 7th congressional district, 2024
Party	Candidate	Votes	%
Democratic	Kweisi Mfume (incumbent)	232,849	80.25
Republican	Scott Collier	49,799	17.16
Libertarian	Ronald M. Owens-Bey	6,840	2.36
Write-in		649	0.22
Total votes		290,137	100.0
Democratic hold			

== See also ==
- Maryland's congressional districts
- List of United States congressional districts

== Bibliography ==
- Archives of Maryland Historical List United States Representatives Maryland State Archives
- Martis, Kenneth C. (1989). The Historical Atlas of Political Parties in the United States Congress. New York: Macmillan Publishing Company.
- Martis, Kenneth C. (1982). The Historical Atlas of United States Congressional Districts. New York: Macmillan Publishing Company.
- Congressional Biographical Directory of the United States 1774–present
- House of Representatives Election Statistics, 1920 to Present
