= 1810 Maryland's 4th congressional district special election =

A special election was held in Maryland's 4th congressional district on October 1, 1810 to fill a vacancy in the 11th Congress left by the resignation, on May 14, 1810, of the previous incumbent, Roger Nelson (DR). This election was held at the same time as the general election for the 12th Congress.

== Election results ==
Candidate	Party	Votes	Percent
Samuel Ringgold	Democratic-Republican	1,732	98.1%
Benjamin Galloway	Federalist	29	1.6%

Ringgold also won election to the 12th Congress. He took his seat in the 11th Congress on December 7, 1810

== See also ==
- List of special elections to the United States House of Representatives
