= 1810 Maryland gubernatorial election =

- November 19, 1810
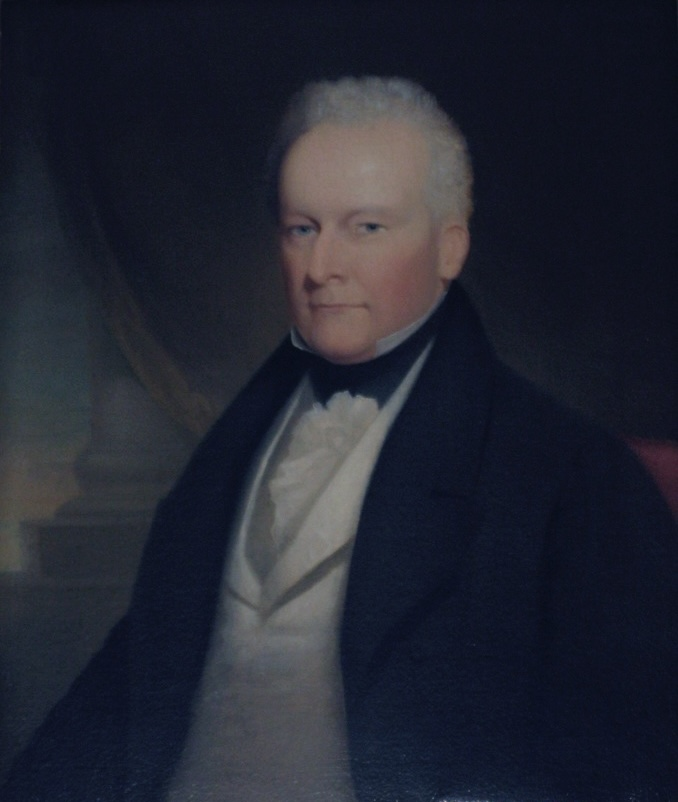
Nominee	Edward Lloyd
Party	Democratic-Republican
Popular vote	55
Percentage	88.71%
Governor before election
Edward Lloyd
Democratic-Republican
Elected Governor
Edward Lloyd
Democratic-Republican

The 1810 Maryland gubernatorial election was held on November 19, 1810, in order to elect the governor of Maryland. Incumbent Democratic-Republican governor Edward Lloyd was re-elected by the Maryland General Assembly against Federalist candidates former governor John Eager Howard, Levin Winder and former United States senator Charles Carroll.

== General election ==
On election day, November 19, 1810, incumbent Democratic-Republican governor Edward Lloyd was re-elected by the Maryland General Assembly, thereby retaining Democratic-Republican control over the office of governor. Lloyd was sworn in for his second full term on November 26, 1810.

=== Results ===
Maryland gubernatorial election, 1810
Party	Candidate	Votes	%
Democratic-Republican	Edward Lloyd (incumbent)	55	88.71
Federalist	John Eager Howard	3	4.84
Federalist	Levin Winder	3	4.84
Federalist	Charles Carroll	1	1.61
Total votes		62	100.00
Democratic-Republican hold			
