= 1805 Pennsylvania's 11th congressional district special election =

A special election was held in Pennsylvania's 11th congressional district on October 8, 1805, to fill a vacancy left by the resignation of John B. Lucas (DR) before the first session of the 9th Congress to take a position as district judge for the District of Louisiana.

== Election results ==
Candidate	Party	Votes	Percent
Samuel Smith	Democratic-Republican	3,275	52.7%
James O'Hara	Federalist	2,263	36.4%
Nathaniel Irish	Constitutional Republicans (Quid)	681	11.0%

Smith took his seat December 2, 1805

== See also ==
- List of special elections to the United States House of Representatives
