= 1810 New Jersey's at-large congressional district special election =

A special election was held in New Jersey's at-large congressional district on October 30, 1810, to fill a vacancy left in the 11th Congress by the death of James Cox (DR) on September 12, 1810.

== Election returns ==
Candidate	Party	Votes	Percent
John A. Scudder	Democratic-Republican	2,345	76.7%
John Linn	Democratic-Republican	329	10.8%
Jacob S. Thompson	Democratic-Republican	311	10.2%
Isaac Mickle	Democratic-Republican	71	2.3%

Scudder took his seat on December 3, 1810

== See also ==
- List of special elections to the United States House of Representatives
