= 1811 Maryland's 6th congressional district special election =

A special election was held in Maryland's 6th congressional district on October 2, 1811, to fill a vacancy left by the resignation of John Montgomery (DR) on April 29, 1811.

== Election results ==
Candidate	Party	Votes	Percent
Stevenson Archer	Democratic-Republican	1,859	76.1%
William Hollingsworth	Federalist	584	23.9%

Archer took his seat on November 4, 1811

== See also ==
- List of special elections to the United States House of Representatives
