= 1810 Massachusetts' 10th congressional district special election =

A special election was held in Massachusetts's 10th congressional district on October 8, 1810, to have Joseph Allen (F) fill a vacancy left by the resignation of Jabez Upham (F).

== Election results ==
Candidate	Party	Votes	Percent
Joseph Allen	Federalist	1,802	55.2%
John Spurr	Democratic-Republican	1,464	44.8%

Allen took his seat on December 13, 1810, and left in the new year.

== See also ==
- List of special elections to the United States House of Representatives
