= Samuel Smith (Pennsylvania politician) =

American politician

Samuel Smith (before 1780 – fl. 1815) was an early 19th-century member of the United States House of Representatives from Pennsylvania's 11th congressional district.

Smith was a Democratic-Republican who served as an associate judge of Erie County, Pennsylvania, from 1803 to 1805. In 1805 he was elected to the Ninth Congress to fill the vacancy caused by the resignation of United States Representative John Baptiste Charles Lucas. He was reelected in 1806 and 1808 to the Tenth and Eleventh Congresses, but was defeated in his bid for reelection to the Twelfth Congress in 1810.

He was later receiver of public moneys at the land office at St Stephens, Mississippi Territory circa 1815.

Despite his nearly 5 1/2 years in Congress, remarkably little, if any, historical documentation survives regarding Samuel Smith's life, including the years of his birth and death.

== Sources ==
- United States Congress. "Samuel Smith (id: S000610)". Biographical Directory of the United States Congress.
- The Political Graveyard

U.S. House of Representatives
Preceded by John Baptiste Charles Lucas	Member of the U.S. House of Representatives from Pennsylvania's 11th congressional district 1805–1811	Succeeded by Abner Lacock
