= 1810 Connecticut's at-large congressional district special election =

A special election was held in Connecticut's at-large congressional district on September 17, 1810 to fill a vacancy left by the resignation of Samuel W. Dana (F) in May, 1810 after being elected to the Senate.

== Election results ==
Candidate	Party	Votes	Percent
Ebenezer Huntington	Federalist	2,765	42.5%
Lyman Law	Federalist	2,503	38.4%
Samuel B. Sherwood	Federalist	813	12.5%
Nathaniel Terry	Federalist	184	2.8%
Others	(All Federalist)	248	3.8%

Ebenezer Huntington had also run for a seat in the 12th Congress, but lost. He took his seat in the 11th Congress on October 11, 1810

== See also ==
- List of special elections to the United States House of Representatives
