= 1810 New York's 2nd congressional district special election =

A special election was held in New York's 2nd congressional district April 24–26, 1810 to fill a vacancy left by the resignation of William Denning (DR), who had never actually served.

== Election returns ==
Candidate	Party	Votes	Percent
Samuel L. Mitchill	Democratic-Republican	6,129	52.4%
John B. Coles	Federalist	5,568	47.8%

Mitchill took his seat on December 4, 1810

== See also ==
- List of special elections to the United States House of Representatives
