= 1810 Massachusetts's 11th congressional district special election =

A special election was held in Massachusetts's 11th congressional district on October 8, 1810, to fill a vacancy left by the resignation of William Stedman (F) on July 16, 1810.

== Election returns ==
Candidate	Party	Votes	Percent
Abijah Bigelow	Federalist	2,123	72.3%
Timothy Whiting	Democratic-Republican	790	26.9%
Moses White	Democratic-Republican	23	0.8%

Bigelow took his seat December 14, 1810

== See also ==
- List of special elections to the United States House of Representatives
