= Robert Marion =

American politician

Member of the U.S. House of Representatives from South Carolina's 1st district
- In office March 4, 1805 – December 4, 1810
- Preceded by: Thomas Lowndes
- Succeeded by: Langdon Cheves

Member of the South Carolina Senate from St. John's, Berkeley Parish
- In office November 22, 1802 – November 23, 1805
- Preceded by: Henry Laurens, Jr.
- Succeeded by: Thomas Porcher

Member of the South Carolina House of Representatives from St. Stephen's Parish
- In office January 3, 1790 – December 19, 1795

Personal details
- Born: 1766 Berkeley District, Province of South Carolina, British America
- Died: March 22, 1811 (aged 44–45) St. Stephen's Parish, South Carolina, U.S.
- Party: Democratic-Republican
- Education: University of the State of Pennsylvania
- Profession: planter, politician

Robert Marion (1766 – March 22, 1811) was a U.S. representative from South Carolina.

Born 1766 in the Berkeley District of the Province of South Carolina, Marion graduated from the University of the State of Pennsylvania (now the University of Pennsylvania), Philadelphia, in 1784. He owned and managed a plantation at Belle Isle, South Carolina.

He served as a justice of quorum for St. Stephen's Parish and was the justice of the peace of Charleston, South Carolina. He then served in the state house of representatives from 1790 to 1796, and in the state senate from 1802 to 1805. Marion was elected as a Democratic-Republican to the Ninth, Tenth, and Eleventh Congresses and served from March 4, 1805, until his resignation on December 4, 1810.

He died on his plantation in St. Stephen's Parish, March 22, 1811.

== Sources ==
- United States Congress. "Robert Marion (id: M000130)". Biographical Directory of the United States Congress.

U.S. House of Representatives
Preceded by Thomas Lowndes	Member of the U.S. House of Representatives from South Carolina's 1st congressional district 1805–1810	Succeeded by Langdon Cheves
