= John Love (Virginia politician) =

American politician and lawyer from Virginia

Member of the Virginia Senate
- In office 1816–1820
- Preceded by: John Gibson
- Succeeded by: Redmond Foster

Member of the U.S. House of Representatives from Virginia's 9th district
- In office March 4, 1807 – March 3, 1811
- Preceded by: Philip R. Thompson
- Succeeded by: Aylett Hawes

Member of the Virginia House of Delegates for Fauquier County, Virginia
- In office 1805–1807 Serving with Thomas Hunton
- Preceded by: Augustine Jennings
- Succeeded by: John Edmunds

Personal details
- Died: August 17, 1822 Alexandria, Virginia, U.S.
- Party: Democratic-Republican
- Profession: Politician, lawyer

John Love (died August 17, 1822) was a nineteenth-century politician and lawyer from Virginia. Decades after his death, during the American Civil War, a man of the same name served in the Wheeling Convention, representing Upshur County, West Virginia, many miles westward.

== Career ==
Love was admitted to the bar in 1801 and began his legal practice in Alexandria, Virginia and nearby counties. He lived in Alexandria for about two years. Both before and after, until his departure to Tennessee in 1820, he operated a farm near Buckland at the border of Prince William and Fauquier County counties, which he operated using enslaved labor. Buckland Farm, and his brother Samuel's farms in nearby Loudoun County, became known for breeding thoroughbred racing horses, and were some of the earliest importers of stock from Arabia and Europe. He advertised his prime stud horse, 'Mahomet', in a Dumfries newspaper in 1796.

Fauquier County voters elected Love as one of their representatives in the Virginia House of Delegates, alongside veteran Thomas Hunton, in 1805 and re-elected the pair the following year. In 1807 John Edmunds succeeded him as delegate, because Love had been elected as a Democratic-Republican to the United States House of Representatives in 1806, and he was also re-elected there and served from 1807 to 1811. As congressman, Love served as chairman of the Committee on the District of Columbia in his second term, from 1809 to 1811. In 1816, voters from the district that included Prince William and Fairfax counties elected Love to the Virginia State Senate (again a part-time position) and he served from 1816, but was succeeded by Redmond Foster before the end of his four-year term.

== Death and legacy ==
Love died in Alexandria, Virginia on August 17, 1822. He was interred at the Congressional Cemetery in Washington, D.C.

U.S. House of Representatives
Preceded by Philip R. Thompson	Member of the U.S. House of Representatives from Virginia's 9th congressional district March 4, 1807 – March 3, 1811	Succeeded by Aylett Hawes
