= James Cox (New Jersey politician) =

American politician (1753–1810)

Member of the U.S. House of Representatives from New Jersey's 11th district
- In office March 4, 1809 – September 12, 1810
- Preceded by: John Lambert
- Succeeded by: John A. Scudder

Personal details
- Born: October 16, 1753 Monmouth, New Jersey
- Died: September 12, 1810 (aged 56) Upper Freehold Township, New Jersey
- Resting place: Yellow Meeting House Cemetery
- Spouse: Ann Potts
- Children: 13

James Cox (October 16, 1753 – September 12, 1810) was a Revolutionary War veteran and early American politician who served as a member of the United States House of Representatives (from New Jersey) in the 11th Congress.

== Biography ==
He was born in Monmouth, New Jersey (now Freehold Borough) on October 16, 1753, the son of Judge Joseph and Mary (Mount) Cox.

=== Revolutionary War ===
He was an officer in the American Revolutionary War at the Battles of Brandywine, Germantown and Monmouth, and was elected Brigadier General of the Monmouth Brigade after the war.

=== New Jersey assembly ===
He was a member of the New Jersey General Assembly from 1801 to 1807 and was its speaker from 1804.

=== Congress ===
He served as a Representative in the 11th United States Congress from 1809 until he died of a stroke on September 12, 1810, in Upper Freehold Township.

He was buried in the Yellow Meeting House Cemetery in the Red Valley section of the township.

== Family ==
James Cox married Ann Potts (1757–1815), daughter of William and Amy (Borden) Potts, on February 29, 1776. They were the parents of thirteen children, including Ezekiel Taylor Cox, who was a member of the Ohio State Senate and father of United States Representative Samuel Sullivan Cox.

== See also ==
- List of members of the United States Congress who died in office (1790–1899)
- Coxs Corner, Monmouth County, New Jersey

U.S. House of Representatives
Preceded by John Lambert	Member of the U.S. House of Representatives from New Jersey's at-large congressional district 1809–1810	Succeeded by John A. Scudder
