= Archibald Van Horne =

American politician (1758–1817)

Archibald Van Horne (1758–1817) was an American politician.

Van Horne was born in 1758. He was appointed adjutant of the Fourteenth Regiment of the Maryland Militia on April 18, 1798, and was commissioned captain on May 26, 1802. He was a member of the Maryland House of Delegates from 1801 to 1803 and 1805, and served as speaker in the latter year. He resigned November 11, 1805, and was later elected as a Republican to the Tenth and Eleventh Congresses, serving from March 4, 1807, to March 3, 1811. During the Eleventh Congress, he was chairman of the Committee on the District of Columbia.

Van Horne was again elected to the Maryland House of Delegates and served from 1814 to 1816. He was then elected to the Maryland State Senate in 1816 and served until his death in Prince George's County, Maryland the following year.

Van Horne was a slaveholder. After his death his house located at 4706 Mann St. just outside Washington, D.C. is believed to have been a station on the Underground Railroad.

U.S. House of Representatives
Preceded by Leonard Covington	Member of the U.S. House of Representatives from Maryland's 2nd congressional district 1807–1811	Succeeded by Joseph Kent
