= James Cochran (North Carolina politician) =

American politician

James Otis Cochran (ca. 1767 – April 7, 1813) was a Congressional Representative from North Carolina; born near Mount Tirzah Township, Person County, North Carolina, about 1767; attended the public schools; engaged in agricultural pursuits near Helena, North Carolina; member of the State house of commons 1802–1806; served in the State senate in 1807; elected as a Republican to the Eleventh and Twelfth Congresses (March 4, 1809 – March 3, 1813); died in Roxboro, Person County, N.C., April 7, 1813; interment in the burial ground at Leas Chapel, five miles west of Roxboro, N.C. He is the grandfather of James Cochran Dobbin.

Cochran parents, Charles and Isabelle (Whitelaw) Cochran, were natives of Perth, Scotland.

U.S. House of Representatives
Preceded by Marmaduke Williams	Member of the U.S. House of Representatives from North Carolina's 9th congressional district 1809-1813	Succeeded by Bartlett Yancey
