= John A. Scudder =

American politician (1759–1836)

John Anderson Scudder

Member of the U.S. House of Representatives from New Jersey's at-large district
- In office October 31, 1810 – March 3, 1811
- Preceded by: James Cox
- Succeeded by: George C. Maxwell

Personal details
- Born: March 22, 1759 Freehold, New Jersey
- Died: November 6, 1836 (aged 77) Washington, Indiana, U.S.
- Resting place: Old City Cemetery, Washington, Indiana
- Party: Democratic-Republican

John Anderson Scudder (March 22, 1759 – November 6, 1836) was a U.S. Representative from New Jersey.

Born in Freehold Township to Founding Father Nathaniel Scudder and his wife Isabella (née Anderson), Scudder completed preparatory studies, and graduated from Princeton College in 1775. He studied medicine and commenced practice in Monmouth County, New Jersey. During the Revolutionary War, Scudder served as a surgeon's mate in the First Regiment of Monmouth County, in 1777. He was the Secretary of the New Jersey Medical Society in 1788 and 1789.

He served as a member of the New Jersey General Assembly representing Monmouth County from 1801 through 1807, and as a member of the New Jersey Legislative Council in 1809.

Scudder was elected as a Democratic-Republican to the Eleventh Congress to fill the vacancy caused by the death of James Cox and served from October 31, 1810, to March 3, 1811. He was not a candidate for renomination to the Twelfth Congress.

Scudder resumed the practice of medicine. He moved to Kentucky after 1810 and to Daviess County, Indiana, in 1819. He died in Washington, Indiana on November 6, 1836, and was interred in the Old City Cemetery there.

U.S. House of Representatives
Preceded by James Cox	Member of the U.S. House of Representatives from New Jersey's at-large congressional district October 31, 1810 – March 3, 1811	Succeeded by George C. Maxwell
