= Edward Lloyd V =

Governor of Maryland (1779-1834)

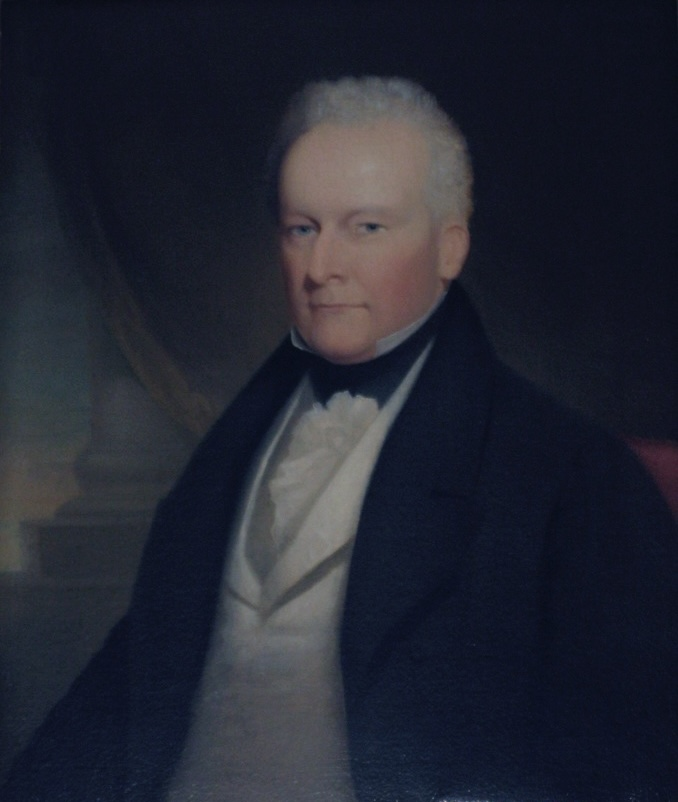
- Portrait, c. 1834

United States Senator from Maryland
- In office March 4, 1819 – January 14, 1826
- Preceded by: Robert H. Goldsborough
- Succeeded by: Ezekiel F. Chambers

13th Governor of Maryland
- In office June 9, 1809 – November 16, 1811
- Preceded by: Robert Wright
- Succeeded by: Robert Bowie

Member of the U.S. House of Representatives from Maryland's 7th district
- In office December 3, 1806 – March 3, 1809
- Preceded by: Joseph H. Nicholson
- Succeeded by: John Brown

Member of the Maryland House of Delegates
- In office 1800–1805

Member of the Maryland Senate
- In office 1826–1831

Personal details
- Born: July 22, 1779 Talbot County, Maryland
- Died: June 2, 1834 (aged 54) Annapolis, Maryland
- Party: Democratic-Republican, Jacksonian
- Spouse: Sally Scott Murray
- Parents: Edward Lloyd IV (father); Elizabeth Tayloe (mother)
- Relatives: Edward Lloyd II (great-grandfather); John Tayloe II (great-grandfather)
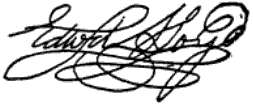
- Signature

Edward Lloyd V (July 22, 1779 – June 2, 1834) was an American politician and slaveholder. He served as the 13th governor of Maryland from 1809 to 1811, and as a United States senator from Maryland between 1819 and 1826. He also served as a U.S. congressman from the seventh district of Maryland from 1807 to 1809. Frederick Douglass described the life of the enslaved people forced to work on his plantation.

== Life and career ==
Born in 1779 at "Wye House", Talbot County, Maryland, he was a member of a prominent Eastern Shore family, "the Lloyds of Wye," which had lived in Talbot County since the mid-17th century. His father Edward Lloyd IV was a member of the Continental Congress and his mother Elizabeth Tayloe was the daughter of John Tayloe II of Mount Airy. He received early education from private tutors.

Lloyd served in the Maryland House of Delegates from 1800 to 1805. He was elected to the Ninth Congress to fill the vacancy caused by the resignation of Joseph H. Nicholson and was reelected to the Tenth Congress, serving from December 3, 1806, to March 3, 1809. In 1808, Lloyd was elected as Governor of Maryland, a position he served in from 1809 to 1811.

During this period Lloyd traded a Merino ram for "Sailor," a male Newfoundland that had a reputation for spectacularly enthusiastic water dog retrieving of ducks. The dog was bred with other retrievers at Lloyd's estate on the eastern shore of Chesapeake Bay. Sailor is now considered the "father" of the Chesapeake Bay Retriever line.

Lloyd was commissioned a lieutenant colonel of the Ninth Regiment of Maryland Militia and also served as a member of the Maryland State Senate from 1811 to 1815. He was elected as a Democratic Republican (later Crawford Republican, then Jacksonian) to the United States Senate in 1819, was reelected in 1825, and served from March 4, 1819, until his resignation on January 14, 1826. In the Senate, Lloyd served as chairman of the Committee on the District of Columbia (Eighteenth and Nineteenth Congresses).

Later in life, Lloyd served as member of the Maryland State Senate from 1826 to 1831, and as President of the Senate in 1826. He died in Annapolis, Maryland, and is interred in the family burying ground at Wye House near Easton, Maryland.

== Description by Frederick Douglass ==
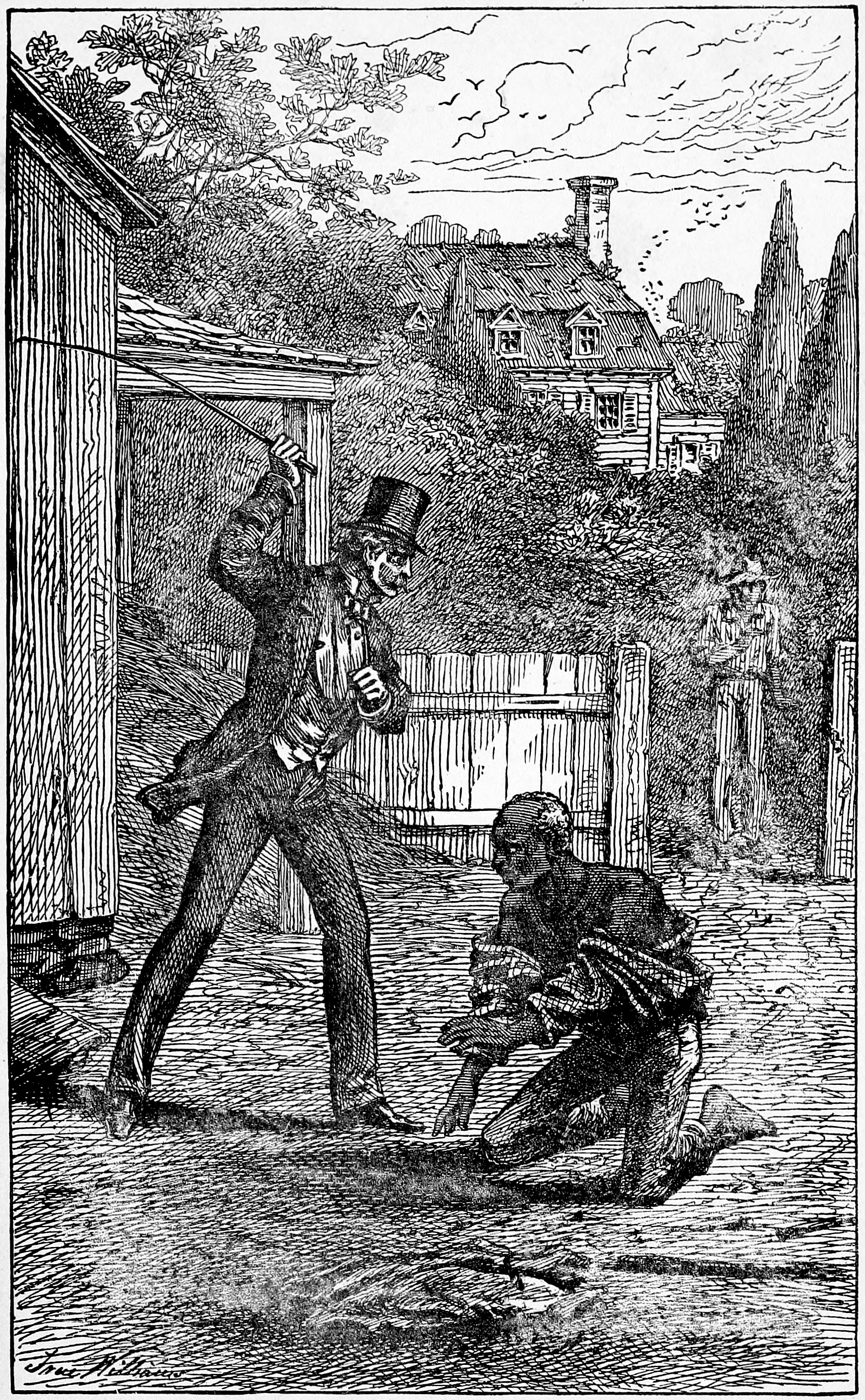
Illustration from Life and Times of Frederick Douglass showing Lloyd whipping Old Barney

Lloyd was an important slaveholder and vocal defender of the institution of slavery throughout his political career. He owned 468 people in 1832.

The African-American abolitionist Frederick Douglass, who had grown up as a slave on one of Lloyd's plantations, discussed Lloyd in his 1845 autobiography The Narrative of the Life of Frederick Douglass. The book describes the acts of cruelty committed by Lloyd's overseers, and dwells at length on Lloyd's own despotic treatment, including whippings of two slaves caring for his horses:

To all these complaints no matter how unjust, the slave must answer never a word. Colonel Lloyd could not brook any contradiction from a slave. When he spoke, a slave must stand, listen, and tremble; and such was literally the case. I have seen Colonel Lloyd make old Barney, a man between fifty and sixty years of age, uncover his bald head, kneel down upon the cold, damp ground, and receive upon his naked and toil-worn shoulders more than thirty lashes at the time.

Political offices
Preceded by Joseph Hopper Nicholson	Member of the U.S. House of Representatives from Maryland's 7th congressional district 1807–1809	Succeeded by John Brown
Preceded by Robert Wright	Governor of Maryland; 1809–1811	Succeeded by Robert Bowie
Preceded by William R. Stuart	President of the Maryland State Senate; 1826	Succeeded by William H. Marriott
U.S. Senate
Preceded by Robert H. Goldsborough	U.S. senator (Class 3) from Maryland; 1819–1826; Served alongside: Alexander C. Hanson, William Pinkney, Samuel Smith	Succeeded by Ezekiel F. Chambers
