= Joseph Allen (Massachusetts politician) =

American politician (1749–1827)

Member of the U.S. House of Representatives from Massachusetts's 10th district
- In office October 8, 1810 – March 3, 1811
- Preceded by: Jabez Upham
- Succeeded by: Elijah Brigham

Personal details
- Born: September 2, 1749 Boston, Province of Massachusetts Bay, British America
- Died: September 2, 1827 (aged 78) Worcester, Massachusetts, U.S.
- Party: Federalist
- Children: George Allen
- Education: Harvard College

Joseph Allen (September 2, 1749 – September 2, 1827) was a member of the eleventh United States Congress from Massachusetts's 10th congressional district (1810–1811).

He was born in Boston in the Province of Massachusetts Bay, and graduated from Harvard College in 1774. He worked in a business in Leicester, in 1774, moving to Worcester in 1776. In Worcester he served as a County Clerk from 1776 to 1810. In 1788 he served as a delegate to the Massachusetts Constitutional Convention. He was elected to the United States House of Representatives in 1810 as a Federalist, to fill the vacancy left by the resignation of Jabez Upham previously that year, and he served in that capacity through 1811. He declined to run for re-election to a full term. Afterwards, he served as a Massachusetts State Councilor from 1815 through 1818. He died in Worcester in 1827.

U.S. House of Representatives
Preceded by Jabez Upham	Member of the U.S. House of Representatives from Massachusetts's 10th congressional district October 8, 1810 – March 3, 1811	Succeeded by Elijah Brigham
