= John Brown (Maryland politician) =

American congressman from Maryland (died 1815)

Member of the U.S. House of Representatives from Maryland's 7th district
- In office March 4, 1809 – October 1, 1810
- Preceded by: Edward Lloyd V
- Succeeded by: Robert Wright

Member of the Maryland House of Delegates
- In office 1807–1808

John Brown (died December 13, 1815) was an American Congressman from the seventh district of Maryland.

Brown's birth date and location are unknown. He served as a member of the Maryland House of Delegates from 1807 to 1808 and was elected as a Democratic-Republican to the Eleventh Congress in 1809.

He was reelected to the Twelfth Congress, but resigned before the close of the Eleventh Congress to accept an appointment as clerk of the court of Queen Anne's County, Maryland, an office he held until his death in Centerville, Maryland.

He is interred in Chesterfield Cemetery.

== Bibliography ==
- United States Congress. "John Brown (id: B000928)". Biographical Directory of the United States Congress.

Political offices
Preceded by Edward Lloyd V	Member of the U.S. House of Representatives from Maryland's 7th congressional district 1809–1810	Succeeded by Robert Wright
