= Robert Wright (Maryland politician) =

American politician (1752–1826)

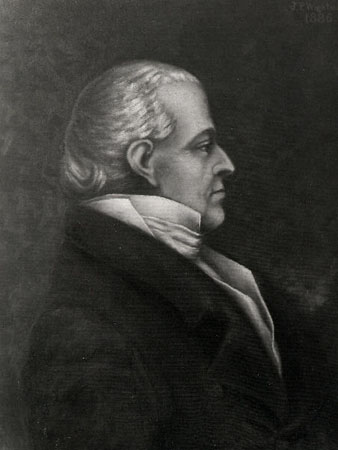

United States Senator from Maryland
- In office November 19, 1801 – November 12, 1806
- Preceded by: William Hindman
- Succeeded by: Philip Reed

12th Governor of Maryland
- In office November 12, 1806 – June 9, 1809
- Preceded by: Robert Bowie
- Succeeded by: Edward Lloyd V

Member of the U.S. House of Representatives from Maryland's 7th district
- In office November 29, 1810 – March 3, 1817
- Preceded by: John Brown
- Succeeded by: Thomas Culbreth
- In office March 4, 1821 – March 3, 1823
- Preceded by: Thomas Culbreth
- Succeeded by: William Hayward Jr.

Member of the Maryland Senate
- In office 1801

Personal details
- Born: November 20, 1752 Chestertown, Province of Maryland, British America
- Died: September 7, 1826 (aged 73) Queen Anne's County, Maryland, U.S.
- Party: Democratic-Republican
- Spouse: Sarah De Courcy

Robert Wright (November 20, 1752 – September 7, 1826) was an American politician and soldier who fought in the American Revolutionary War.

== Early life ==
Wright was born at Narborough, near Chestertown, Maryland, and attended the Kent Free School (later Washington College) of Chestertown. He studied law, was admitted to the bar in 1773, and commenced practice in Chestertown.

== Career ==
He served in the Maryland militia during the American Revolutionary War as private, lieutenant, and later as captain. After the war, he served as a member of the Maryland House of Delegates from 1784 to 1786, and as a member of the Maryland State Senate in 1801.

In 1800, Wright was elected as a Democratic Republican to the United States Senate on November 19, 1801, for the term commencing March 4, 1801. In the Senate, Wright served as delegate to the Farmers’ National Convention in 1803. He resigned from the Senate on November 12, 1806, having been elected the 12th governor of Maryland, a position he served in from 1806 to 1809.

After his tenure as governor, Wright served as clerk of Queen Anne's County, Maryland, in 1810, and was elected to the Eleventh and Twelfth Congresses to fill the vacancy caused by the resignation of John Brown. He was re-elected to the Thirteenth and Fourteenth Congresses and served from November 29, 1810, to March 3, 1817. He was an unsuccessful candidate for reelection in 1816 to the Fifteenth Congress, but was elected to the Seventeenth Congress, serving from March 4, 1821, to March 3, 1823. He was not a candidate for renomination in 1822.

In his later life, Wright served as district judge of the lower Eastern Shore district of Maryland from 1823 until his death.

== Personal life ==
Wright was married to Sarah De Courcy. Together, they were the parents of:

- William Henry De Courcy Wright (1795–1864), who married Eliza Lee (née Warner) Wright (1800–1864), the widow of Samuel Turbutt Wright, the 2nd Adjutant General of Maryland.

Wright died on September 7, 1826, at Blakeford in Queen Anne's County. He is interred in the private burying ground of the DeCourcy family at Cheston-on-Wye in Queen Anne's County.

== See also ==
- Widehall (1769-1770), a mansion in Chestertown, Maryland. Wright's home from 1801 to 1822.

U.S. Senate
Preceded by William Hindman	U.S. senator (Class 3) from Maryland; 1801–1806; Served alongside: John E. Howard, Samuel Smith	Succeeded by Philip Reed
Political offices
Preceded by Robert Bowie	Governor of Maryland; 1806–1809	Succeeded by Edward Lloyd V
U.S. House of Representatives
Preceded by John Brown	Member of the U.S. House of Representatives from Maryland's 7th congressional district 1810–1817	Succeeded by Philip Reed
Preceded by Stevenson Archer	Member of the U.S. House of Representatives from Maryland's 7th congressional district 1821–1823	Succeeded by William Hayward, Jr.
