= 1821 New Hampshire gubernatorial election =

- March 13, 1821
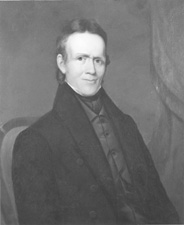
| Nominee | Samuel Bell |
| Party | Democratic-Republican |
| Popular vote | 22,582 |
| Percentage | 92.37% |
- County results Bell: 80–90% 90–100%
Governor before election
Samuel Bell
Democratic-Republican
Elected Governor
Samuel Bell
Democratic-Republican

The 1821 New Hampshire gubernatorial election was held on March 13, 1821.

Incumbent Democratic-Republican Governor Samuel Bell won re-election to a third term.

== General election ==
=== Major candidates ===
- Samuel Bell, Democratic-Republican, incumbent Governor

=== Minor candidates ===
The following candidates may not have been formally nominated and attracted only scattering votes.

- William Hale, Federalist, former U.S. Representative
- Jeremiah Mason, Federalist, former U.S. Senator, Federalist nominee for Governor in 1818
- David L. Morril, Democratic-Republican, incumbent U.S. Senator
- George B. Upham, Federalist, former U.S. Representative, former Speaker of the New Hampshire House of Representatives

=== Results ===
1821 New Hampshire gubernatorial election (Note: Some sources give slightly different results. The result given is taken from the New Hampshire Senate Journal.)
| Party | Candidate | Votes | % | ±% |
|---|---|---|---|---|
| Democratic-Republican | Samuel Bell (incumbent) | 22,582 | 92.37% | |
| Scattering | | 1,866 | 7.63% | |
| Majority | | 20,716 | 84.74% | |
| Turnout | | 24,448 | | |
| Democratic-Republican hold | | Swing | | |
