= 1820 New Hampshire gubernatorial election =

- March 14, 1820
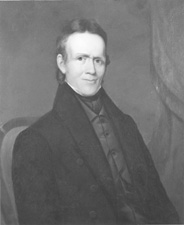
Nominee	Samuel Bell
Party	Democratic-Republican
Popular vote	22,212
Percentage	89.67%
- County results Bell: 80–90% 90–100%
Governor before election
Samuel Bell
Democratic-Republican
Elected Governor
Samuel Bell
Democratic-Republican

The 1820 New Hampshire gubernatorial election was held on March 14, 1820.

Incumbent Democratic-Republican Governor Samuel Bell won re-election to a second term.

== General election ==
=== Major candidates ===
- Samuel Bell, Democratic-Republican, incumbent Governor

=== Minor candidates ===
The following candidates may not have been formally nominated and attracted only scattering votes.

- William Hale, Federalist, former U.S. Representative
- Jeremiah Mason, Federalist, former U.S. Senator, Federalist nominee for Governor in 1818
- David L. Morril, Democratic-Republican, incumbent U.S. Senator
- George B. Upham, Federalist, former U.S. Representative, former Speaker of the New Hampshire House of Representatives

=== Results ===
1820 New Hampshire gubernatorial election (Note: Some sources give slightly different results. The result given is taken from the New Hampshire Senate Journal.)
Party	Candidate	Votes	%	±%
Democratic-Republican	Samuel Bell (incumbent)	22,212	89.67%	
Democratic-Republican	David L. Morril	599	2.42%	
Federalist	William Hale	596	2.41%	
Scattering		1,364	5.51%	
Majority		21,613	87.25%	
Turnout		24,771		
Democratic-Republican hold		Swing		
