= 1822 New Hampshire gubernatorial election =

- March 12, 1822
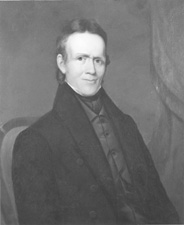
Nominee	Samuel Bell
Party	Democratic-Republican
Popular vote	22,934
Percentage	95.64%
- County results Bell: 90–100%
Governor before election
Samuel Bell
Democratic-Republican
Elected Governor
Samuel Bell
Democratic-Republican

The 1822 New Hampshire gubernatorial election was held on March 12, 1822.

Incumbent Democratic-Republican Governor Samuel Bell won re-election to a fourth term.

== General election ==
=== Major candidates ===
- Samuel Bell, Democratic-Republican, incumbent Governor

=== Minor candidates ===
The following candidates may not have been formally nominated and attracted only scattering votes.

- Jeremiah Mason, Federalist, former U.S. Senator, Federalist nominee for Governor in 1818
- David L. Morril, Democratic-Republican, incumbent U.S. Senator
- George B. Upham, Federalist, former U.S. Representative, former Speaker of the New Hampshire House of Representatives

=== Results ===
1822 New Hampshire gubernatorial election (Note: Some sources give slightly different results. The result given is taken from the New Hampshire Senate Journal.)
Party	Candidate	Votes	%	±%
Democratic-Republican	Samuel Bell (incumbent)	22,934	95.64%	
Scattering		1,046	4.36%	
Majority		21,888	91.28%	
Turnout		23,980		
Democratic-Republican hold		Swing		
