= List of United States representatives in the 11th Congress =

This is a complete list of United States representatives during the 11th United States Congress listed by seniority. For the most part, representatives are ranked by the beginning of their terms in office.

As an historical article, the districts and party affiliations listed reflect those during the 11th Congress (March 4, 1809 – March 3, 1811). Seats and party affiliations on similar lists for other congresses will be different for certain members.

This article describes the criteria for seniority in the House of Representatives and sets out the list of members by seniority. It is prepared on the basis of the interpretation of seniority applied to the House of Representatives in the current congress. In the absence of information to the contrary, it is presumed that the twenty-first-century practice is identical to the seniority customs used during the 11th Congress.

== House seniority ==
Seniority in the House, for representatives with unbroken service, depends on the date on which the members first term began. That date is either the start of the Congress (4 March in odd numbered years, for the era up to and including the 73rd Congress starting in 1933) or the date of a special election during the Congress. Since many members start serving on the same day as others, ranking between them is based on alphabetical order by the last name of the representative.

Representatives in early congresses were often elected after the legal start of the Congress. Such representatives are attributed with unbroken seniority, from the legal start of the congressional term, if they were the first person elected to a seat in a Congress. The date of the election is indicated in a note.

The seniority date is normally taken from the members entry in the Biographical Directory of the United States Congress, except where the date given is the legal start of the Congress and the actual election (for someone who was not the first person elected to the seat in that Congress) was later. The date of election is taken from United States Congressional Elections 1788-1997. In a few instances the latter work provides dates, for the start and end of terms, which correct those in the Biographical Directory.

The Biographical Directory normally uses the date of a special election, as the seniority date. However, mostly in early congresses, the date of the member taking his seat can be the one given. The date of the special election is mentioned in a note to the list below, when that date is not used as the seniority date by the Biographical Directory.

Representatives who returned to the House, after having previously served, are credited with service equal to one less than the total number of terms they served. When a representative has served a prior term of less than two terms (i.e. prior term minus one equals less than one), he is ranked above all others whose service begins on the same day.

== Leadership ==
In this Congress the only formal leader was the speaker of the House. Two speakership ballots were held on May 22, 1809, and Joseph B. Varnum (DR-MA) was re-elected for a second consecutive term.

Candidate	1st ballot	2nd ballot
Joseph B. Varnum (DR-MA)	60	65
Nathaniel Macon (DR-NC)	36	45
Timothy Pitkin (F-CT)	20	6
Charles Goldsborough (F-MD)	1	1
Benjamin Howard (DR-KY)	0	1
Roger Nelson (DR-MD)	1	1
blank ballots	2	0

The title Dean of the House (sometimes known, in the nineteenth century, as Father of the House) was held by the member with the longest continuous service. It was not a leadership position.

== Standing committees ==
The House created its first standing committee, on April 13, 1789. There were nine standing committees, listed in the rules initially used by the 11th Congress.

Committees, in this period, were appointed for a session at a time by the speaker.

This list refers to the standing committees of the House in the 11th Congress, the year of establishment as a standing committee, the number of members assigned to the committee and the dates of appointment in each session, the end of the session and its chairman. Chairmen, who were re-appointed after serving in the previous Congress, are indicated by an *.

The first session was May 22, 1809 – June 28, 1809 (38 days), the second session was November 27, 1809 – May 1, 1810 (156 days) and the third session was December 3, 1810 – March 3, 1811 (91 days).

No.	Committee	From	Members	Appointed	Chairman
1	Accounts	1805	3	May 23, 1809 – June 28, 1809	*Nicholas R. Moore (DR-MD)
1	Accounts	1805	3	November 28, 1809 – May 1, 1810	William Milnor (F-PA)
1	Accounts	1805	3	December 6, 1810 – March 3, 1811	Nicholas R. Moore (DR-MD)
2	Claims	1794	7	May 23, 1809 – June 28, 1809	Richard M. Johnson (DR-KY)
2	Claims	1794	7	November 28, 1809 – May 1, 1810	Richard M. Johnson (DR-KY)
2	Claims	1794	7	December 6, 1810 – March 3, 1811	Erastus Root (DR-NY)
3	Commerce and Manufactures	1795	7	May 23, 1809 – June 28, 1809	*Thomas Newton, Jr. (DR-VA)
3	Commerce and Manufactures	1795	7	November 28, 1809 – May 1, 1810	*Thomas Newton, Jr. (DR-VA)
3	Commerce and Manufactures	1795	7	December 6, 1810 – March 3, 1811	*Thomas Newton, Jr. (DR-VA)
4	District of Columbia	1808	7	May 23, 1809 – June 28, 1809	John Love (DR-VA)
4	District of Columbia	1808	7	November 28, 1809 – May 1, 1810	John Love (DR-VA)
4	District of Columbia	1808	7	December 6, 1810 – March 3, 1811	Archibald Van Horne (DR-MD)
5	Elections	1789	7	May 23, 1809 – June 28, 1809	*William Findley (DR-PA)
5	Elections	1789	7	November 28, 1809 – May 1, 1810	*William Findley (DR-PA)
5	Elections	1789	7	December 6, 1810 – March 3, 1811	*William Findley (DR-PA)
6	Post Office and Post Roads	1808	17	May 23, 1809 – June 28, 1809	*John Rhea (DR-TN)
6	Post Office and Post Roads	1808	16	November 28, 1809 – May 1, 1810	*John Rhea (DR-TN)
6	Post Office and Post Roads	1808	16	December 6, 1810 – March 3, 1811	*John Rhea (DR-TN)
7	Public Lands	1805	7	May 23, 1809 – June 28, 1809	*Jeremiah Morrow (DR-OH)
7	Public Lands	1805	7	November 28, 1809 – May 1, 1810	*Jeremiah Morrow (DR-OH)
7	Public Lands	1805	7	December 6, 1810 – March 3, 1811	*Jeremiah Morrow (DR-OH)
8	Revisal and Unfinished Business	1795	3	May 23, 1809 – June 28, 1809	Henry Southard (DR-NJ)
8	Revisal and Unfinished Business	1795	3	November 28, 1809 – May 1, 1810	Henry Southard (DR-NJ)
8	Revisal and Unfinished Business	1795	3	December 6, 1810 – March 3, 1811	Henry Southard (DR-NJ)
9	Ways and Means	1802	7	May 23, 1809 – June 28, 1809	John W. Eppes (DR-VA)
9	Ways and Means	1802	7	November 28, 1809 – May 1, 1810	John W. Eppes (DR-VA)
9	Ways and Means	1802	7	December 6, 1810 – March 3, 1811	John W. Eppes (DR-VA)

== List of representatives by seniority ==
A numerical rank is assigned to each of the 142 members initially elected to the 11th Congress. Other members, who were not the first person elected to a seat but who joined the House during the Congress, are not assigned a number.

One representative-elect was not sworn in, as he did not qualify before he resigned. The list below includes the representative-elect (with name in italics), with the seniority he would have held if he had been sworn in.

Party designations used in this article are DR for Democratic-Republican members and F for Federalist representatives. Designations used for service in the first three congresses are (A) for Anti-Administration members and (P) for Pro-Administration representatives.

U.S. House seniority
Rank	Representative	Party	District	Seniority date	Notes
Ten consecutive terms
1	Nathaniel Macon	DR	NC-6	March 4, 1791	(A) Previously served 1791-95 while as a member of the House. Dean of the House.
Eight consecutive terms
2	Joseph B. Varnum	DR	MA-4	March 4, 1795	Speaker of the House
3	Samuel W. Dana	F	CT-al	January 3, 1797	Resigned to become US Senator: May 10, 1810
Eight non-consecutive terms
4	William Findley	DR	PA-8	March 4, 1803	Previously served (A) 1791-95 and (DR) 1795-99 while as a member of the House. Chairman: Elections.
Seven consecutive terms
5	Matthew Clay	DR	VA-14	March 4, 1797	Elected to this Congress: April 1809
6	John Dawson	DR	VA-10	March 4, 1797	Elected to this Congress: April 1809
7	Richard Stanford	DR	NC-8	March 4, 1797	
8	Robert Brown	DR	PA-2	December 4, 1798	
Seven non-consecutive terms
9	John Clopton	DR	VA-22	March 4, 1801	Previously served (DR) 1795-99 while as a member in the House. Elected to this Congress: April 1809.
10	John Smilie	DR	PA-9	March 4, 1799	Previously served (A) 1793-95 while as a member of the House.
11	Richard Winn	DR	SC-5	January 24, 1803	Previously served (A) 1793-95 and (DR) 1795-97 while as a member of the House.
Six consecutive terms
12	Willis Alston	DR	NC-2	March 4, 1799	
13	John Davenport	F	CT-al	March 4, 1799	
14	Edwin Gray	DR	VA-19	March 4, 1799	Elected to this Congress: April 1809
15	John Randolph	DR	VA-15	March 4, 1799	Elected to this Congress: April 1809
Six non-consecutive terms
16	David Bard	DR	PA-4	March 4, 1803	Previously served (DR) 1795-99 while as a member of the House.
17	James Holland	DR	NC-11	March 4, 1801	Previously served (DR) 1795-97 while as a member of the House. Last term while serving as a member of the House.
18	Matthew Lyon	DR	KY-1	March 4, 1803	Previously served (DR-VT) 1797-1801 while as a member of the House. Last term while serving as a member of the House.
Five consecutive terms
19	William Butler	DR	SC-2	March 4, 1801	
20	John Campbell	F	MD-1	March 4, 1801	Last term while serving as a member of the House.
21	William Helms	DR	NJ-al	March 4, 1801	Last term while serving as a member of the House.
22	Thomas Moore	DR	SC-7	March 4, 1801	
23	Thomas Newton, Jr.	DR	VA-20	March 4, 1801	Elected to this Congress: April 1809. Chairman: Commerce and Manufactures.
24	John Smith	DR	VA-3	March 4, 1801	Elected to this Congress: April 1809
25	Henry Southard	DR	NJ-al	March 4, 1801	Chairman: Revisal and Unfinished Business. Last term while serving as a member of the House until 14th Congress.
26	Killian K. Van Rensselaer	F	NY-7	March 4, 1801	Last term while serving as a member of the House.
27	Richard Cutts	DR	MA-14	June 22, 1801	
28	Benjamin Tallmadge	F	CT-al	September 21, 1801	
Five non-consecutive terms
29	Walter Jones	DR	VA-8	March 4, 1803	Previously served (DR) 1797–99. Elected to this Congress: April 1809. Last term while serving as a member of the House.
Four consecutive terms
30	Martin Chittenden	F	VT-4	March 4, 1803	
31	John W. Eppes	DR	VA-16	March 4, 1803	Elected to this Congress: April 1809. Chairman: Ways and Means. Last term while still serving as a member of the House until 13th Congress.
32	Peterson Goodwyn	DR	VA-18	March 4, 1803	Elected to this Congress: April 1809
33	John G. Jackson	DR	VA-1	March 4, 1803	Elected to this Congress: April 1809. Resigned on September 28, 1810, while still serving as a member of the House. Last term while serving as a member of the House until 13th Congress.
34	Joseph Lewis, Jr.	F	VA-7	March 4, 1803	Elected to this Congress: April 1809
35	Nicholas R. Moore	DR	MD-5	March 4, 1803	Chairman: Accounts (1809 and 1810–11). Last term while serving as a member of the House until 13th Congress.
36	Jeremiah Morrow	DR	OH-al	March 4, 1803	Chairman: Public Lands
37	John Rea	DR	PA-7	March 4, 1803	Last term while serving as a member of the House until 13th Congress
38	John Rhea	DR	TN-1	March 4, 1803	Elected to this Congress: May 4–5, 1809. Washington District. Chairman: Post Office and Post Roads.
39	Ebenezer Seaver	DR	MA-13	March 4, 1803	
40	William Stedman	F	MA-11	March 4, 1803	Resigned on July 16, 1810, while still serving as a member of the House.
41	Samuel Taggart	F	MA-6	March 4, 1803	
42	Roger Nelson	DR	MD-4	November 6, 1804	Resigned on May 14, 1810, while still serving as a member of the House.
Three consecutive terms
43	Burwell Bassett	DR	VA-12	March 4, 1805	Elected to this Congress: April 1809
44	Orchard Cook	DR	MA-16	March 4, 1805	Last term while serving as a member of the House.
45	William Ely	F	MA-5	March 4, 1805	
46	Charles Goldsborough	F	MD-8	March 4, 1805	
47	Robert Marion	DR	SC-1	March 4, 1805	Resigned on December 4, 1810, while still serving as a member of the House.
48	Jonathan O. Moseley	F	CT-al	March 4, 1805	
49	Gurdon S. Mumford	DR	NY-2	March 4, 1805	Last term while still serving as a member of the House.
50	Josiah Quincy	F	MA-1	March 4, 1805	
51	Thomas Kenan	DR	NC-5	August 8, 1805	Last term while still serving as a member of the House.
52	Timothy Pitkin	F	CT-al	September 16, 1805	
53	Lewis B. Sturges	F	CT-al	September 16, 1805	
54	Samuel Smith	DR	PA-11	November 7, 1805	Last term
55	Robert Whitehill	DR	PA-4	November 7, 1805	
56	Dennis Smelt	DR	GA-al	September 1, 1806	Last term while still serving as a member of the House.
57	William A. Burwell	DR	VA-13	December 1, 1806	Elected to this Congress: April 1809
58	John Porter	DR	PA-1	December 8, 1806	Last term while still serving as a member of the House.
59	William W. Bibb	DR	GA-al	January 26, 1807	
Three non-consecutive terms
60	Thomas Sammons	DR	NY-9	March 4, 1809	Previously served (DR) 1803–07
61	John Thompson	DR	NY-8	March 4, 1807	Previously served (DR) 1799-1801 while as a member of the House. Last term while still serving as a member of the House.
62	Adam Boyd	DR	NJ-al	March 8, 1808	Previously served (DR) 1803-05 while as a member of the House.
Two consecutive terms
63	Lemuel J. Alston	DR	SC-8	March 4, 1807	Last term while serving as a member of the House.
64	Epaphroditus Champion	F	CT-al	March 4, 1807	
65	Howell Cobb	DR	GA-al	March 4, 1807	
66	Joseph Desha	DR	KY-6	March 4, 1807	
67	Meshack Franklin	DR	NC-12	March 4, 1807	
68	Barent Gardenier	F	NY-5	March 4, 1807	Last term while serving as a member of the House.
69	Benjamin Howard	DR	KY-5	March 4, 1807	Resigned on April 10, 1810, while serving in the House.
70	Robert Jenkins	F	PA-3	March 4, 1807	Last term while serving as a member of the House.
71	Richard M. Johnson	DR	KY-4	March 4, 1807	Chairman: Claims (1809–10)
72	Philip B. Key	F	MD-3	March 4, 1807	
73	Edward S. Livermore	F	MA-3	March 4, 1807	Last term while serving as a member of the House.
74	John Love	DR	VA-9	March 4, 1807	Elected to this Congress: April 1809. Chairman: District of Columbia (1809–10). Last term while serving as a member of the House.
75	William Milnor	F	PA-2	March 4, 1807	Chairman: Accounts (1809–10). Last term while serving as a member of the House until 14th Congress.
76	John Montgomery	DR	MD-6	March 4, 1807	
77	Thomas Newbold	DR	NJ-al	March 4, 1807	
78	Wilson C. Nicholas	DR	VA-21	March 4, 1807	Elected to this Congress: April 1809. Resigned on November 27, 1809, while still serving as a member of the House.
79	Matthias Richards	DR	PA-3	March 4, 1807	Last term while still serving as a member of the House.
80	Lemuel Sawyer	DR	NC-1	March 4, 1807	
81	John Taylor	DR	SC-4	March 4, 1807	Resigned, to become US Senator: December 30, 1810
82	George M. Troup	DR	GA-al	March 4, 1807	
83	Jabez Upham	F	MA-10	March 4, 1807	Resigned in 1810 while still serving as a member of the House.
84	Archibald Van Horne	DR	MD-2	March 4, 1807	Chairman: District of Columbia (1810–11). Last term while serving as a member of the House.
85	Joseph Calhoun	DR	SC-6	June 2, 1807	Last term while still serving as a member of the House.
86	Ezekiel Bacon	DR	MA-12	September 16, 1807	
87	Nicholas Van Dyke	F	DE-al	October 6, 1807	Last term while serving as a member of the House.
88	Samuel Shaw	DR	VT-1	September 6, 1808	
89	Thomas Gholson, Jr.	DR	VA-17	November 7, 1808	
90	Richard Jackson, Jr.	F	RI-al	November 11, 1808	
91	Benjamin Say	DR	PA-1	November 16, 1808	Resigned in June 1809 while still serving as a member of the House.
Two non-consecutive terms
92	William Chamberlain	F	VT-3	March 4, 1809	Previously served (F) 1803-05 while as a member of the House. Last term while serving as a member of the House.
93	William Kennedy	DR	NC-3	March 4, 1809	Previously served (DR) 1803-05 while as a member of the House. Last term while serving as a member of the House until seated in 12th Congress.
94	Erastus Root	DR	NY-12	March 4, 1809	Previously served (DR) 1803-05 while as a member of the House. Chairman: Claims (1810–11). Last term while serving as a member of the House until 14th Congress.
95	John Stanly	F	NC-4	March 4, 1809	Previously served (F) 1801-03 while as a member of the House. Last term while serving as a member of the House.
96	James Stephenson	F	VA-2	March 4, 1809	Previously served 1803–05. Elected to this Congress: April 1809. Last term while serving as a member of the House until 17th Congress.
97	Uri Tracy	DR	NY-13	March 4, 1809	Previously served (DR) 1805-07 while serving as a member of the House.
98	Elisha R. Potter	F	RI-al	March 4, 1809	Previously served (F) November 15, 1796–97 while as a member of the House.
One term
99	William Anderson	DR	PA-1	March 4, 1809	
100	William Baylies	F	MA-7	March 4, 1809	Unseated, after election contest: June 28, 1809. Only term while serving as a member of the House until 13th Congress.
101	Daniel Blaisdell	F	NH-al	March 4, 1809	Only term while serving as a member of the House.
102	James Breckinridge	F	VA-5	March 4, 1809	Elected to this Congress: April 1809
103	John Brown	DR	MD-7	March 4, 1809	Resigned while still serving as a member of the House: 1810
104	John C. Chamberlain	F	NH-al	March 4, 1809	Only term while serving as a member of the House.
105	James Cochran	DR	NC-9	March 4, 1809	
106	James Cox	DR	NJ-al	March 4, 1809	Died while still serving as a member of the House: September 12, 1810
107	William Crawford	DR	PA-1	March 4, 1809	
108	Henry Crist	DR	KY-3	March 4, 1809	Only term while serving as a member of the House.
109	William Denning	DR	NY-2	March 4, 1809	Resigned, as Representative-elect: c. February 1810
110	James Emott	F	NY-4	March 4, 1809	
111	Jonathan Fisk	DR	NY-3	March 4, 1809	Only term while still serving as a member of the House until 13th Congress.
112	Barzillai Gannett	DR	MA-17	March 4, 1809	
113	Gideon Gardner	DR	MA-8	March 4, 1809	Only term while still serving as a member of the House.
114	Thomas R. Gold	F	NY-11	March 4, 1809	
115	William Hale	F	NH-al	March 4, 1809	Only term while still serving as a member of the House until 13th Congress.
116	Nathaniel A. Haven	F	NH-al	March 4, 1809	Only term while still serving as a member of the House.
117	Daniel Hiester	DR	PA-3	March 4, 1809	Only term while still serving as a member of the House.
118	Jonathan H. Hubbard	F	VT-2	March 4, 1809	Only term while still serving as a member of the House.
119	Jacob Hufty	DR	NJ-al	March 4, 1809	
120	Herman Knickerbocker	F	NY-6	March 4, 1809	Only term while still serving as a member of the House.
121	Robert L. Livingston	F	NY-6	March 4, 1809	
122	Aaron Lyle	DR	PA-10	March 4, 1809	
123	Vincent Mathews	F	NY-14	March 4, 1809	Only term while still serving as a member of the House.
124	Archibald McBryde	F	NC-7	March 4, 1809	
125	Samuel McKee	DR	KY-2	March 4, 1809	
126	Alexander McKim	DR	MD-5	March 4, 1809	
127	Pleasant M. Miller	DR	TN-3	March 4, 1809	Elected to this Congress: May 4–5, 1809. Hamilton District. Only term while still serving as a member of the House.
128	John Nicholson	DR	NY-10	March 4, 1809	Only term while still serving as a member of the House.
129	Joseph Pearson	F	NC-10	March 4, 1809	
130	Benjamin Pickman, Jr.	F	MA-2	March 4, 1809	Only term while still serving as a member of the House.
131	Peter B. Porter	DR	NY-15	March 4, 1809	
132	John Roane	DR	VA-11	March 4, 1809	Elected to this Congress: April 1809
133	John Ross	DR	PA-2	March 4, 1809	Only term while still serving as a member of the House until 14th Congress.
134	Ebenezer Sage	DR	NY-1	March 4, 1809	
135	Daniel Sheffey	F	VA-6	March 4, 1809	Elected to this Congress: April 1809
136	George Smith	DR	PA-5	March 4, 1809	
137	Jacob Swoope	F	VA-4	March 4, 1809	Elected to this Congress: April 1809. Only term while still serving as a member of the House.
138	Robert Weakley	DR	TN-2	March 4, 1809	Elected to this Congress: May 4–5, 1809. Mero District. Only term while still serving as a member of the House.
139	Laban Wheaton	F	MA-9	March 4, 1809	
140	Ezekiel Whitman	F	MA-15	March 4, 1809	Only term while still serving as a member of the House until 15th Congress.
141	James Wilson	F	NH-al	March 4, 1809	Only term while still serving as a member of the House.
142	Robert Witherspoon	DR	SC-3	March 4, 1809	Only term while still serving as a member of the House.
Members joining the House, after the start of the Congress
...	Charles Turner, Jr.	DR	MA-7	June 28, 1809	Seated after election contest
...	Adam Seybert	DR	PA-1	October 10, 1809	Special election
...	David S. Garland	DR	VA-21	January 17, 1810	Special election: December 1809. Only term while serving as a member of the House.
...	William T. Barry	DR	KY-5	August 8, 1810	Special election: August 6, 1810. Only term while serving as a member of the House.
...	Joseph Allen	F	MA-10	October 8, 1810	Special election. Only term while serving as a member of the House.
...	Abijah Bigelow	F	MA-11	October 8, 1810	Special election
...	Ebenezer Huntington	F	CT-al	October 11, 1810	Special election: September 17, 1810. Only term while serving as a member of the House until 15th Congress.
...	Samuel Ringgold	DR	MD-4	October 15, 1810	Special election: October 1, 1810
...	John A. Scudder	DR	NJ-al	October 31, 1810	Special election: October 30–31, 1810. Only term while serving as a member of the House.
...	Robert Wright	DR	MD-7	November 29, 1810	Special election: November 15, 1810
...	Samuel L. Mitchill	DR	NY-2	December 4, 1810	Previously served (DR) 1801-November 22, 1804. Special election: April 24–26, 1810.
...	William McKinley	DR	VA-1	December 21, 1810	Special election: November 1810. Only term while serving as a member of the House.
...	Langdon Cheves	DR	SC-1	December 31, 1810	Special election
Non voting members
a	George Poindexter	-	MS-al	March 4, 1807	Delegate from Mississippi Territory
b	Julien De L. Poydras	-	OL-al	March 4, 1809	Delegate from Orleans Territory. Only term while serving in the House.
c	Jonathan Jennings	-	IN-al	November 27, 1809	Delegate from Indiana Territory

== See also ==
- 11th United States Congress
- List of United States congressional districts
- List of United States senators in the 11th Congress
