= List of United States representatives in the 12th Congress =

This is a complete list of United States representatives during the 12th United States Congress listed by seniority. For the most part, representatives are ranked by the beginning of their terms in office.

As an historical article, the districts and party affiliations listed reflect those during the 12th Congress (March 4, 1811 – March 3, 1813). Seats and party affiliations on similar lists for other congresses will be different for certain members.

This article describes the criteria for seniority in the House of Representatives and sets out the list of members by seniority. It is prepared on the basis of the interpretation of seniority applied to the House of Representatives in the current congress. In the absence of information to the contrary, it is presumed that the twenty-first-century practice is identical to the seniority customs used during the 12th Congress.

== House seniority ==
Seniority in the House, for representatives with unbroken service, depends on the date on which the members first term began. That date is either the start of the Congress (4 March in odd numbered years, for the era up to and including the 73rd Congress starting in 1933) or the date of a special election during the Congress. Since many members start serving on the same day as others, ranking between them is based on alphabetical order by the last name of the representative.

Representatives in early congresses were often elected after the legal start of the Congress. Such representatives are attributed with unbroken seniority, from the legal start of the congressional term, if they were the first person elected to a seat in a Congress. The date of the election is indicated in a note.

The seniority date is normally taken from the members entry in the Biographical Directory of the United States Congress, except where the date given is the legal start of the Congress and the actual election (for someone who was not the first person elected to the seat in that Congress) was later. The date of election is taken from United States Congressional Elections 1788-1997. In a few instances the latter work provides dates, for the start and end of terms, which correct those in the Biographical Directory.

The Biographical Directory normally uses the date of a special election, as the seniority date. However, mostly in early congresses, the date of the member taking his seat can be the one given. The date of the special election is mentioned in a note to the list below, when that date is not used as the seniority date by the Biographical Directory.

Representatives who returned to the House, after having previously served, are credited with service equal to one less than the total number of terms they served. When a representative has served a prior term of less than two terms (i.e. prior term minus one equals less than one), he is ranked above all others whose service begins on the same day.

== Leadership ==
In this Congress the only formal leader was the speaker of the House. A speakership ballot was held on November 4, 1811, and Henry Clay (DR-KY) was elected.

The title Dean of the House (sometimes known, in the nineteenth century, as Father of the House) was held by the member with the longest continuous service. It was not a leadership position.

== Standing committees ==
The House created its first standing committee, on April 13, 1789. There were nine standing committees, listed in the rules initially used by the 12th Congress.

Committees, in this period, were appointed for a session at a time by the speaker.

This list refers to the standing committees of the House in the 12th Congress, the year of establishment as a standing committee, the number of members assigned to the committee and the dates of appointment in each session, the end of the session and its chairman. Chairmen, who were re-appointed after serving in the previous Congress, are indicated by an *.

The first session was November 4, 1811 – July 6, 1812 (245 days) and the second session was November 2, 1812 – March 3, 1813 (122 days).

No.	Committee	From	Members	Appointed	Chairman
1	Accounts	1805	3	November 8, 1811 – July 6, 1812	Charles Turner, Jr. (DR-MA)
1	Accounts	1805	3	November 5, 1812 – March 3, 1813	Charles Turner, Jr. (DR-MA)
2	Claims	1794	7	November 8, 1811 – July 6, 1812	Burwell Bassett (DR-VA)
2	Claims	1794	7	November 5, 1812 – March 3, 1813	Thomas Gholson, Jr. (DR-VA)
3	Commerce and Manufactures	1795	7	November 8, 1811 – July 6, 1812	*Thomas Newton, Jr. (DR-VA)
3	Commerce and Manufactures	1795	7	November 5, 1812 – March 3, 1813	*Thomas Newton, Jr. (DR-VA)
4	District of Columbia	1808	7	November 8, 1811 – July 6, 1812	Joseph Lewis, Jr. (F-VA)
4	District of Columbia	1808	7	November 5, 1812 – March 3, 1813	Joseph Lewis, Jr. (F-VA)
5	Elections	1789	7	November 7, 1811 – July 6, 1812	*William Findley (DR-PA)
5	Elections	1789	7	November 5, 1812 – March 3, 1813	*William Findley (DR-PA)
6	Post Office and Post Roads	1808	17	November 8, 1811 – July 6, 1812	*John Rhea (DR-TN)
6	Post Office and Post Roads	1808	7	November 5, 1812 – March 3, 1813	*John Rhea (DR-TN)
7	Public Lands	1805	7	November 8, 1811 – July 6, 1812	*Jeremiah Morrow (DR-OH)
7	Public Lands	1805	7	November 5, 1812 – March 3, 1813	*Jeremiah Morrow (DR-OH)
8	Revisal and Unfinished Business	1795	3	November 8, 1811 – July 6, 1812	Adam Seybert (DR-PA)
8	Revisal and Unfinished Business	1795	3	November 5, 1812 – March 3, 1813	Burwell Bassett (DR-VA)
9	Ways and Means	1802	7	November 8, 1811 – July 6, 1812	Ezekiel Bacon (DR-MA)
9	Ways and Means	1802	7	November 5, 1812 – March 3, 1813	Langdon Cheves (DR-SC)

== List of representatives by seniority ==
A numerical rank is assigned to each of the 142 members initially elected to the 12th Congress. Other members, who were not the first person elected to a seat but who joined the House during the Congress, are not assigned a number (with the exception of the first member from the newly admitted state of Louisiana, who is numbered 143).

Four representatives-elect were not sworn in, as they resigned. The list below includes the representatives-elect (with name in italics), with the seniority they would have held if sworn in.

Party designations used in this article are DR for Democratic-Republican members and F for Federalist representatives. Designations used for service in the first three congresses are (A) for Anti-Administration members and (P) for Pro-Administration representatives.

United States House of Representatives seniority
Rank	Representative	Party	District	Seniority date	Notes
10 consecutive terms
1	Nathaniel Macon	DR	NC-6	March 4, 1791	(A) 1791–95. Dean of the House.
9 consecutive terms
2	Joseph B. Varnum	DR	MA-4	March 4, 1795	Resigned, as Representative-elect, to become US Senator: June 29, 1811
9 non-consecutive terms
3	William Findley	DR	PA-8	March 4, 1803	Previously served (A) 1791-95 and (DR) 1795-99 while in the House. Chairman: Elections.
8 consecutive terms
4	Matthew Clay	DR	VA-14	March 4, 1797	Elected to this Congress: April 1811. Last term while serving in the House until 14th Congress.
5	John Dawson	DR	VA-10	March 4, 1797	Elected to this Congress: April 1811
6	Richard Stanford	DR	NC-8	March 4, 1797	
7	Robert Brown	DR	PA-2	December 4, 1798	
Eight non-consecutive terms
8	John Clopton	DR	VA-22	March 4, 1801	Previously served (DR) 1795-99 while in the House. Elected to this Congress: April 1811.
9	John Smilie	DR	PA-9	March 4, 1799	Previously served (A) 1793-95 while in the House. Died on December 30, 1812, while still serving in the House.
10	Richard Winn	DR	SC-5	January 24, 1803	Previously served (A) 1793-95 and (DR) 1795-97 while in the House. Last term while serving in the House.
7 consecutive terms
11	Willis Alston	DR	NC-2	March 4, 1799	
12	John Davenport	F	CT-al	March 4, 1799	
13	Edwin Gray	DR	VA-19	March 4, 1799	Elected to this Congress: April 1811. Last term while serving in the House.
14	John Randolph	DR	VA-15	March 4, 1799	Elected to this Congress: April 1811. Last term while serving in the House until 14th Congress.
7 non-consecutive terms
15	David Bard	DR	PA-4	March 4, 1803	Previously served (DR) 1795-99 while in the House.
16	Anthony New	DR	KY-1	March 4, 1811	Previously served (A-VA) 1793-95 and (DR-VA) 1795-1805 while in the House. Last term while serving in the House until 15th Congress.
6 consecutive terms
17	William Butler	DR	SC-2	March 4, 1801	Last term while serving in the House.
18	Thomas Moore	DR	SC-7	March 4, 1801	Last term while serving in the House until 14th Congress.
19	Thomas Newton, Jr.	DR	VA-20	March 4, 1801	Elected to this Congress: April 1811. Chairman: Commerce and Manufactures.
20	John Smith	DR	VA-3	March 4, 1801	Elected to this Congress: April 1811
21	Richard Cutts	DR	MA-14	June 22, 1801	Last term while serving in the House.
22	Benjamin Tallmadge	F	CT-al	September 21, 1801	
6 non-consecutive terms
23	Thomas Blount	DR	NC-3	March 4, 1811	Previously served (A) 1793-95; (DR) 1795-99 and 1805-09 while in the House. Died on February 7, 1812, while still serving in the House.
Five consecutive terms
24	Martin Chittenden	F	VT-4	March 4, 1803	Last term while serving in the House.
25	Peterson Goodwyn	DR	VA-18	March 4, 1803	Elected to this Congress: April 1811
26	Joseph Lewis, Jr.	F	VA-7	March 4, 1803	Elected to this Congress: April 1811. Chairman: District of Columbia.
27	Jeremiah Morrow	DR	OH-al	March 4, 1803	Chairman: Public Lands. Last term while serving in the House until 26th Congress.
28	John Rhea	DR	TN-1	March 4, 1803	Elected to this Congress: August 1–2, 1811. Washington District. Chairman: Post Office and Post Roads.
29	Ebenezer Seaver	DR	MA-13	March 4, 1803	Last term while serving in the House.
30	Samuel Taggart	F	MA-6	March 4, 1803	
Four consecutive terms
31	Burwell Bassett	DR	VA-12	March 4, 1805	Elected to this Congress: April 1811. Chairman: Claims (1811–12). Chairman: Revisal and Unfinished Business (1812–13). Last term while serving in the House until 14th Congress.
32	William Ely	F	MA-5	March 4, 1805	
33	Charles Goldsborough	F	MD-8	March 4, 1805	
34	Jonathan O. Moseley	F	CT-al	March 4, 1805	
35	Josiah Quincy	F	MA-1	March 4, 1805	Last term while serving in the House.
36	Timothy Pitkin	F	CT-al	September 16, 1805	
37	Lewis B. Sturges	F	CT-al	September 16, 1805	
38	Robert Whitehill	DR	PA-4	November 7, 1805	
39	William A. Burwell	DR	VA-13	December 1, 1806	Elected to this Congress: April 1811
40	William W. Bibb	DR	GA-al	January 26, 1807	
Four non-consecutive terms
41	William Blackledge	DR	NC-4	March 4, 1811	Previously served (DR) 1803-09 while in the House. Last term while serving in the House.
42	Thomas Sammons	DR	NY-9	March 4, 1809	Previously served (DR) 1803-07 while in the House. Last term while serving in the House.
43	Adam Boyd	DR	NJ-al	March 8, 1808	Previously served (DR) 1803-05 while in the House. Last term while serving in the House.
44	Samuel L. Mitchill	DR	NY-2	December 4, 1810	Previously served (DR) 1801-November 22, 1804, while in the House. Last term while serving in the House.
Three consecutive terms
45	Epaphroditus Champion	F	CT-al	March 4, 1807	
46	Howell Cobb	DR	GA-al	March 4, 1807	Resigned August 1812 while still serving in the House.
47	Joseph Desha	DR	KY-6	March 4, 1807	
48	Meshack Franklin	DR	NC-12	March 4, 1807	
49	Richard M. Johnson	DR	KY-4	March 4, 1807	
50	Philip B. Key	F	MD-3	March 4, 1807	Last term while serving in the House.
51	John Montgomery	DR	MD-6	March 4, 1807	Resigned, as Representative-elect: April 29, 1811
52	Thomas Newbold	DR	NJ-al	March 4, 1807	Last term while serving in the House.
53	Lemuel Sawyer	DR	NC-1	March 4, 1807	Last term while serving in the House until 15th Congress.
54	George M. Troup	DR	GA-al	March 4, 1807	
55	Ezekiel Bacon	DR	MA-12	September 16, 1807	Chairman: Ways and Means (1811–12). Last term while serving in the House.
56	Samuel Shaw	DR	VT-1	September 6, 1808	Last term while serving in the House.
57	Thomas Gholson, Jr.	DR	VA-17	November 7, 1808	Elected to this Congress: April 1811. Chairman: Claims (1812–13).
58	Richard Jackson, Jr.	F	RI-al	November 11, 1808	
Three non-consecutive terms
59	James Fisk	DR	VT-3	March 4, 1811	Previously served (DR) 1805-09 while in the House.
60	Isaiah L. Green	DR	MA-8	March 4, 1811	Previously served (DR) 1805-09 while in the House.
61	Uri Tracy	DR	NY-13	March 4, 1809	Previously served (DR) 1805-07 while in the House. Last term while serving in the House.
62	David R. Williams	DR	SC-3	March 4, 1811	Previously served (DR) 1805-09 while in the House. Last term while serving in the House.
63	Elisha R. Potter	F	RI-al	March 4, 1809	Previously served (F) November 15, 1796–97 while in the House.
Two consecutive terms
64	William Anderson	DR	PA-1	March 4, 1809	
65	James Breckinridge	F	VA-5	March 4, 1809	Elected to this Congress: April 1811
66	John Brown	DR	MD-7	March 4, 1809	Resigned, as Representative-elect: 1810
67	James Cochran	DR	NC-9	March 4, 1809	Last term while serving in the House.
68	William Crawford	DR	PA-1	March 4, 1809	
69	James Emott	F	NY-4	March 4, 1809	Last term while serving in the House.
70	Barzillai Gannett	DR	MA-17	March 4, 1809	Resigned, as Representative-elect: July 29, 1811
71	Thomas R. Gold	F	NY-11	March 4, 1809	Last term while serving in the House until 14th Congress.
72	Jacob Hufty	DR	NJ-al	March 4, 1809	
73	Robert L. Livingston	F	NY-6	March 4, 1809	Resigned on May 6, 1812, while still serving in the House.
74	Aaron Lyle	DR	PA-10	March 4, 1809	
75	Archibald McBryde	F	NC-7	March 4, 1809	Last term while serving in the House.
76	Samuel McKee	DR	KY-2	March 4, 1809	
77	Alexander McKim	DR	MD-5	March 4, 1809	
78	Joseph Pearson	F	NC-10	March 4, 1809	
79	Peter B. Porter	DR	NY-15	March 4, 1809	Last term while serving in the House until 14th Congress.
80	John Roane	DR	VA-11	March 4, 1809	Elected to this Congress: April 1811
81	Ebenezer Sage	DR	NY-1	March 4, 1809	
82	Daniel Sheffey	F	VA-6	March 4, 1809	Elected to this Congress: April 1811
83	George Smith	DR	PA-5	March 4, 1809	Last term while serving in the House.
84	Laban Wheaton	F	MA-9	March 4, 1809	
85	Charles Turner, Jr.	DR	MA-7	June 28, 1809	Chairman: Accounts. Last term while serving in the House.
86	Adam Seybert	DR	PA-1	October 10, 1809	Chairman: Revisal and Unfinished Business (1811–12)
87	Abijah Bigelow	F	MA-11	October 8, 1810	
88	Samuel Ringgold	DR	MD-4	October 15, 1810	
...	Robert Wright	DR	MD-7	November 29, 1810	Special election to 11th and 12th Congresses: November 15, 1810
89	Langdon Cheves	DR	SC-1	December 31, 1810	Chairman: Ways and Means (1812–13)
Two non-consecutive terms
90	John Sevier	DR	TN-2	March 4, 1811	Previously served (NC-P) June 16, 1790–91 while in the House. Elected to this Congress: August 1–2, 1811. Hamilton District.
91	Elias Earle	DR	SC-8	March 4, 1811	Previously served September 27, 1806–07 while in the House.
One term
92	Daniel Avery	DR	NY-14	March 4, 1811	
93	John Baker	F	VA-2	March 4, 1811	Elected to this Congress: April 1811. Only term while serving in the House.
94	Josiah Bartlett, Jr.	DR	NH-al	March 4, 1811	Only term while serving in the House.
95	Harmanus Bleecker	F	NY-7	March 4, 1811	Only term while serving in the House.
96	Elijah Brigham	F	MA-10	March 4, 1811	
97	John C. Calhoun	DR	SC-6	March 4, 1811	
98	Henry Clay	DR	KY-5	March 4, 1811	Speaker of the House
99	Lewis Condict	DR	NJ-al	March 4, 1811	
100	Thomas B. Cooke	DR	NY-5	March 4, 1811	Only term while serving in the House.
101	Roger Davis	DR	PA-3	March 4, 1811	
102	Samuel Dinsmoor	DR	NH-al	March 4, 1811	Only term while serving in the House.
103	Asa Fitch	F	NY-6	March 4, 1811	Only term while serving in the House.
104	Felix Grundy	DR	TN-3	March 4, 1811	Elected to this Congress: August 1–2, 1811. Mero District.
105	Bolling Hall	DR	GA-al	March 4, 1811	
106	Obed Hall	DR	NH-al	March 4, 1811	Only term while serving in the House.
107	John A. Harper	DR	NH-al	March 4, 1811	Only term while serving in the House.
108	Aylett Hawes	DR	VA-9	March 4, 1811	Elected to this Congress: April 1811
109	John P. Hungerford	DR	VA-8	March 4, 1811	Elected to this Congress: April 1811. Unseated, after election contest: November 29, 1811. Only term while serving in the House until 13th Congress.
110	John M. Hyneman	DR	PA-3	March 4, 1811	
111	Joseph Kent	DR	MD-2	March 4, 1811	
112	William R. King	DR	NC-5	March 4, 1811	
113	Abner Lacock	DR	PA-11	March 4, 1811	Only term while serving in the House (elected to but did not serve in 13th Congress)
114	Lyman Law	F	CT-al	March 4, 1811	
115	Joseph Lefever	DR	PA-3	March 4, 1811	Only term while serving in the House.
116	Peter Little	DR	MD-5	March 4, 1811	Only term while serving in the House until 14th Congress.
117	William Lowndes	DR	SC-4	March 4, 1811	
118	George C. Maxwell	DR	NJ-al	March 4, 1811	Only term while serving in the House.
119	William McCoy	DR	VA-4	March 4, 1811	Elected to this Congress: April 1811
120	Arunah Metcalf	DR	NY-12	March 4, 1811	Only term while serving in the House.
121	James Milnor	F	PA-1	March 4, 1811	Only term while serving in the House.
122	James Morgan	DR	NJ-al	March 4, 1811	Only term while serving in the House.
123	Hugh Nelson	DR	VA-21	March 4, 1811	Elected to this Congress: April 1811
124	Stephen Ormsby	DR	KY-3	March 4, 1811	Only term while serving in the House until 13th Congress.
125	William Paulding, Jr.	DR	NY-2	March 4, 1811	Only term while serving in the House.
126	Israel Pickens	DR	NC-11	March 4, 1811	
127	William Piper	DR	PA-7	March 4, 1811	
128	James Pleasants	DR	VA-16	March 4, 1811	Elected to this Congress: April 1811
129	Benjamin Pond	DR	NY-8	March 4, 1811	Only term while serving in the House. Elected to but did not serve in 14th Congress.
130	William Reed	F	MA-2	March 4, 1811	
131	Henry M. Ridgely	F	DE-al	March 4, 1811	
132	Jonathan Roberts	DR	PA-2	March 4, 1811	
133	William Rodman	DR	PA-2	March 4, 1811	Only term while serving in the House.
134	Silas Stow	DR	NY-10	March 4, 1811	Only term while serving in the House.
135	William Strong	DR	VT-2	March 4, 1811	
136	Philip Stuart	F	MD-1	March 4, 1811	
137	George Sullivan	F	NH-al	March 4, 1811	Only term while serving in the House.
138	Peleg Tallman	DR	MA-16	March 4, 1811	Only term while serving in the House.
139	Pierre Van Cortlandt, Jr.	DR	NY-3	March 4, 1811	Only term while serving in the House.
140	Leonard White	F	MA-3	March 4, 1811	Only term while serving in the House.
141	William Widgery	DR	MA-15	March 4, 1811	Elected to this Congress: April 1, 1811. Only term while serving in the House.
142	Thomas Wilson	F	VA-1	March 4, 1811	Elected to this Congress: April 1811. Only term while serving in the House.
Members joining the House, after the start of the Congress
...	Stevenson Archer	DR	MD-6	October 26, 1811	Special election: October 2, 1811
...	William M. Richardson	DR	MA-4	November 4, 1811	Special election
...	John Taliaferro	DR	VA-8	December 2, 1811	Seated after election contest. Previously served (DR) 1801–03 while in the House. Last term until 18th Congress.
...	Francis Carr	DR	MA-17	April 6, 1812	Special election. Only term while serving in the House.
143	Thomas B. Robertson	DR	LA-al	April 30, 1812	First Representative from new state
...	William Barnett	DR	GA-al	October 5, 1812	Special election
...	Thomas P. Grosvenor	F	NY-6	January 29, 1813	Special election: December 15–17, 1812
...	William Kennedy	DR	NC-3	January 30, 1813	Previously served (DR) 1803-05 while in the House. Special election: January 11, 1813.
Non voting members
a	George Poindexter	-	MS-al	March 4, 1807	Delegate from Mississippi Territory. Last term until Representative in 15th Congress.
b	Jonathan Jennings	-	IN-al	November 27, 1809	Delegate from Indiana Territory
c	Edward Hempstead	-	MO-al	November 9, 1812	Delegate from Missouri Territory
d	Shadrack Bond	-	IL-al	December 3, 1812	Delegate from Illinois Territory

== See also ==
- 12th United States Congress
- List of United States congressional districts
- List of United States senators in the 12th Congress
