= List of United States senators in the 11th Congress =

This is a complete list of United States senators during the 11th United States Congress listed by seniority from March 4, 1809, to March 3, 1811.

Order of service is based on the commencement of the senator's first term. Behind this is former service as a senator (only giving the senator seniority within their new incoming class), service as vice president, a House member, a cabinet secretary, or a governor of a state. The final factor is the population of the senator's state.

The two main parties at this point were the Federalists (F), and Democratic Republicans (DR)

== Terms of service ==
Class	Terms of service of senators that expired in years
Class 2	Terms of service of senators that expired in 1811 (DE, GA, KY, MA, NC, NH, NJ, RI, SC, TN, and VA.)
Class 3	Terms of service of senators that expired in 1813 (CT, DE, MD, NH, NJ, NY, OH, PA, RI, SC, and VT.)
Class 1	Terms of service of senators that expired in 1815 (CT, GA, IN, KY, LA, MA, MD, NC, NY, OH, PA, TN, VA, and VT.)

== U.S. Senate seniority list ==
U.S. Senate seniority
Rank	Senator (party-state)	Seniority date	Other factors
1	James Hillhouse (F-CT)	December 6, 1796	
2	Joseph Inslee Anderson (DR-TN)	September 26, 1797	
3	Samuel White (F-DE)	February 28, 1801	
4	Stephen Row Bradley (DR-VT)	October 15, 1801	
5	Thomas Sumter (DR-SC)	December 16, 1801	
6	Samuel Smith (DR-MD)	March 4, 1803	Former representative
7	Timothy Pickering (F-MA)	March 4, 1803	
8	John Smith (DR-NY)	February 23, 1804	
9	William Branch Giles (DR-VA)	August 11, 1804	
10	James Asheton Bayard, Sr. (F-DE)	November 13, 1804	
11	John Gaillard (DR-SC)	December 6, 1804	
12	Daniel Smith (DR-TN)	March 4, 1805	Former senator
13	Nicholas Gilman (DR-NH)	March 4, 1805	Former representative (8 years)
14	Aaron Kitchell (DR-NJ)	March 4, 1805	Former representative (6 years)
15	James Turner (DR-NC)	March 4, 1805	Former governor
16	Buckner Thruston (DR-KY)	March 4, 1805	
17	John Milledge (DR-GA)	June 19, 1806	
18	Philip Reed (DR-KY)	November 25, 1806	
19	Jesse Franklin (DR-NC)	March 4, 1807	Former senator
20	Andrew Gregg (DR-PA)	March 4, 1807	Former representative
21	John Pope (DR-KY)	March 4, 1807	Kentucky 9th in population (1800)
22	Nahum Parker (DR-NH)	March 4, 1807	New Hampshire 11th in population (1800)
23	Jonathan Robinson (DR-VT)	October 10, 1807	
24	Chauncey Goodrich (F-CT)	October 25, 1807	
25	Elisha Mathewson (F-RI)	October 26, 1807	
26	William Harris Crawford (DR-GA)	November 7, 1807	
27	James Lloyd (F-MA)	June 9, 1808	
28	Return Jonathan Meigs Jr. (DR-OH)	December 12, 1808	
29	Michael Leib (DR-PA)	January 9, 1809	
30	Richard Brent (DR-VA)	March 4, 1809	Former representative (6 years)
31	John Lambert (DR-NJ)	March 4, 1809	Former representative (4 years); New Jersey 10th in population (1800)
32	Francis Malbone (F-RI)	March 4, 1809	Former representative (4 years); New Hampshire 15th in population (1800)
33	Obadiah German (DR-NY)	March 4, 1809	
34	John Condit (DR-NJ)	March 21, 1809	
35	Jenkin Whiteside (DR-TN)	April 11, 1809	
36	Stanley Griswold (DR-OH)	May 18, 1809	
37	Christopher Grant Champlin (F-RI)	June 26, 1809	
38	Charles Tait (DR-GA)	November 27, 1809	
39	Alexander Campbell (DR-OH)	December 11, 1809	
40	Henry Clay (DR-KY)	January 4, 1810	
41	Outerbridge Horsey (F-DE)	January 12, 1810	
42	Charles Cutts (DR-NH)	June 21, 1810	
43	Samuel Whittlesey Dana (F-CT)	December 4, 1810	
44	Thomas Worthington (DR-OH)	December 15, 1810	
45	John Taylor (DR-SC)	December 31, 1810	

== See also ==
- 11th United States Congress
- List of United States representatives in the 11th Congress
