= List of United States senators in the 12th Congress =

This is a complete list of United States senators during the 12th United States Congress listed by seniority from March 4, 1811, to March 3, 1813.

Order of service is based on the commencement of the senator's first term. Behind this is former service as a senator (only giving the senator seniority within their new incoming class), service as vice president, a House member, a cabinet secretary, or a governor of a state. The final factor is the population of the senator's state.

The two main parties at this point were the Federalists (F), and Democratic Republicans (DR)

== Terms of service ==
Class	Terms of service of senators that expired in years
Class 3	Terms of service of senators that expired in 1813 (CT, GA, KY, LA, MD, NC, NH, NY, OH, PA, SC, and VT.)
Class 1	Terms of service of senators that expired in 1815 (CT, DE, MA, MD, NJ, NY, OH, PA, RI, TN, VA, and VT.)
Class 2	Terms of service of senators that expired in 1817 (DE, GA, KY, LA, MA, NC, NH, NJ, RI, SC, TN, and VA.)

== U.S. Senate seniority list ==
U.S. Senate seniority
Rank	Senator (party-state)	Seniority date	Other factors
1	Joseph Inslee Anderson (DR-TN)	September 26, 1797	
2	Stephen Row Bradley (DR-VT)	October 15, 1801	
3	Samuel Smith (DR-MD)	March 4, 1803	
4	John Smith (DR-NY)	February 23, 1804	
5	William Branch Giles (DR-VA)	August 11, 1804	
6	James Asheton Bayard, Sr. (F-DE)	November 13, 1804	
7	John Gaillard (DR-SC)	December 6, 1804	
8	Nicholas Gilman (DR-NH)	March 4, 1805	Former representative (8 years)
9	James Turner (DR-NC)	March 4, 1805	
10	Philip Reed (DR-KY)	November 25, 1806	
11	Jesse Franklin (DR-NC)	March 4, 1807	Former senator
12	Andrew Gregg (DR-PA)	March 4, 1807	Former representative
13	John Pope (DR-KY)	March 4, 1807	
14	Jonathan Robinson (DR-VT)	October 10, 1807	
15	Chauncey Goodrich (F-CT)	October 25, 1807	
16	William Harris Crawford (DR-GA)	November 7, 1807	
17	James Lloyd (F-MA)	June 9, 1808	
18	Michael Leib (DR-PA)	January 9, 1809	
19	Richard Brent (DR-VA)	March 4, 1809	Former representative (6 years)
20	John Lambert (DR-NJ)	March 4, 1809	Former representative (4 years); New Jersey 10th in population (1800)
21	Obadiah German (DR-NY)	March 4, 1809	
22	John Condit (DR-NJ)	March 4, 1809	March 21, 1809
23	Jenkin Whiteside (DR-TN)	April 11, 1809	
24	Christopher Grant Champlin (F-RI)	June 26, 1809	
25	Charles Tait (DR-GA)	November 27, 1809	
26	Alexander Campbell (DR-OH)	December 11, 1809	
27	Outerbridge Horsey (F-DE)	January 12, 1810	
28	Charles Cutts (DR-NH)	June 21, 1810	
29	Samuel Whittlesey Dana (F-CT)	December 4, 1810	
30	Thomas Worthington (DR-OH)	December 15, 1810	
31	John Taylor (DR-SC)	December 31, 1810	
32	George Mortimer Bibb (DR-KY)	March 4, 1811	Kentucky 9th in population (1800)
33	Jeremiah Brown Howell (DR-RI)	March 4, 1811	Rhode Island 15th in population (1800)
34	Joseph Bradley Varnum (DR-MA)	June 29, 1811	
35	George Washington Campbell (DR-TN)	October 8, 1811	Former representative
36	William Hunter (F-RI)	October 28, 1811	
37	Allan Bowie Magruder (DR-LA)	September 3, 1812	
38	Jean Noel Destréhan (DR-LA)	September 3, 1812	
39	Thomas Posey (DR-LA)	October 8, 1812	
40	James Brown (DR-LA)	February 5, 1813	

== See also ==
- 12th United States Congress
- List of United States representatives in the 12th Congress
