= Silas Betton =

American lawyer, sheriff and politician

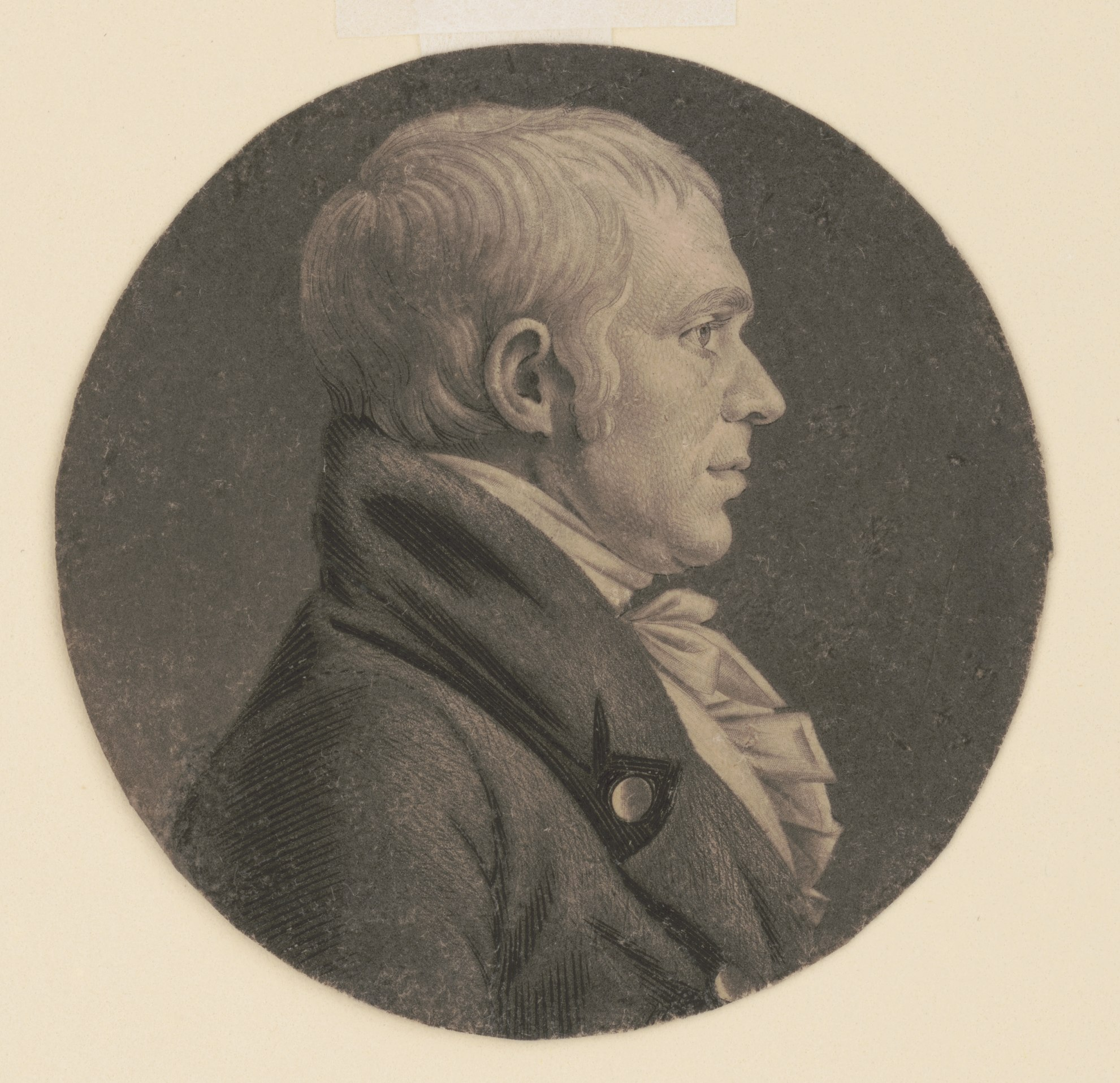

Member of the New Hampshire House of Representatives
- In office 1810–1811

Member of the U.S. House of Representatives from New Hampshire's At-Large district
- In office March 4, 1803 – March 3, 1807
- Preceded by: George B. Upham
- Succeeded by: Peter Carleton

Member of the New Hampshire Senate
- In office 1801–1803

Member of the New Hampshire House of Representatives
- In office 1797–1799

Personal details
- Born: August 26, 1768 Londonderry, Province of New Hampshire, British America
- Died: January 22, 1822 (aged 53) Salem, New Hampshire, U.S.
- Resting place: Old Parish Cemetery; Salem, New Hampshire
- Citizenship: U.S.
- Party: Federalist
- Spouse: Mary Thornton Betton
- Relations: Matthew Thornton
- Children: Caroline Betton; George O. Betton; Harriet Betton; Mary J. Betton; Wealthy J. Betton; Thornton Betton; Charles Cotesworth Betton
- Education: Dartmouth College
- Profession: Lawyer; High Sheriff; Politician

Silas Betton (August 26, 1768 – January 22, 1822) was an American lawyer, sheriff and politician from the U.S. state of New Hampshire. He served as a member of the United States House of Representatives, the New Hampshire Senate and the New Hampshire House of Representatives during the late 1700s and early 1800s.

== Early life ==
Betton was born in Londonderry in the Province of New Hampshire, the son of James and Elizabeth (Dickey) Betton. He studied under a private tutor, and graduated from Dartmouth College in 1787. He studied law, was admitted to the bar and began the practice of law in Salem, New Hampshire in 1790.

== Political career ==
He was a member of the New Hampshire House of Representatives from 1797 to 1799 and a member of the New Hampshire Senate from 1801 to 1803. Elected as a Federalist candidate to the Eighth and Ninth Congresses, he served as a United States representative for New Hampshire from March 4, 1803, to March 3, 1807. After leaving Congress, he resumed the practice of law. He served again as a member of the New Hampshire House of Representatives in 1810 and 1811.

When Josiah Butler left the office of sheriff of Rockingham County, Betton became high sheriff, serving from 1813 to 1818.

== Death ==
Betton died in Salem, New Hampshire in 1822 and was interred at the Old Parish Cemetery in Salem.

== Personal life ==
He married Mary Thornton Betton, the daughter of Matthew Thornton, a signer of the United States Declaration of Independence. They had seven children: Caroline Betton, George O. Betton, Harriet Betton, Mary J. Betton, Wealthy J. Betton, Thornton Betton and Charles Cotesworth Betton.

U.S. House of Representatives
Preceded by George B. Upham	Member of the U.S. House of Representatives from New Hampshire's at-large congressional district 1803–1807	Succeeded by Peter Carleton
