= Bradbury Cilley =

American politician

Member of the U.S. House of Representatives from New Hampshire's at-large District
- In office March 4, 1813 – March 3, 1817
- Preceded by: Josiah Bartlett Jr.
- Succeeded by: Josiah Butler

3rd United States Marshal for the District of New Hampshire
- In office March 19, 1798 – May 3, 1802
- Appointed by: John Adams
- Preceded by: Nathaniel Roger
- Succeeded by: Michael McClary

Personal details
- Born: February 1, 1760 Nottingham, Province of New Hampshire, British America
- Died: December 17, 1831 (aged 71) Nottingham, New Hampshire, U.S.
- Party: Federalist
- Spouse: Martha "Patty" Poor Cilley
- Profession: Farmer; United States Marshal politician

Bradbury Cilley (February 1, 1760 – December 17, 1831) was an American politician and a United States Representative from New Hampshire.

== Early life ==
Born in Nottingham in the Province of New Hampshire, Cilley attended the common schools and then engaged in agricultural pursuits. He served as Moderator for many years for the town of Nottingham: 1788, 1798, 1802, 1807, 1808, 1812, 1813, 1821, 1825 and 1827.

== Career ==
Appointed by President John Adams as United States marshal for the district of New Hampshire on March 19, 1798, Cilley served in that capacity until May 3, 1802.

Elected as a Federalist to the Thirteenth and Fourteenth Congresses, Cilley served as United States Representative At-large for the state of New Hampshire from (March 4, 1813 – March 3, 1817). Active in the militia, he also served as a colonel and aide on the staff of Governor John Taylor Gilman for two years from 1814 to 1816.

== Death ==
Cilley retired from public life and died in Nottingham on December 17, 1831 (age 71 years, 319 days). He is interred in the General Joseph Cilley Burying Ground in Nottingham Square.

== Family life ==
Son of Colonel Joseph and Sara Longfellow, Cilley was the uncle of Jonathan Cilley and Joseph Cilley, both of whom served in the United States Congress in the 19th century. He married Martha "Patty" Poor, daughter of General Enoch Poor, on November 19, 1792.

U.S. House of Representatives
Preceded by Josiah Bartlett Jr.	Member of the U.S. House of Representatives from New Hampshire; 1813-1817	Succeeded by Josiah Butler
