= 1819 New Hampshire gubernatorial election =

- March 9, 1819
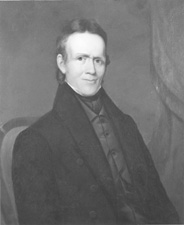

Nominee	Samuel Bell	William Hale
Party	Democratic-Republican	Federalist
Popular vote	13,761	8,660
Percentage	56.71%	35.69%
- County results Bell: 40–50% 50–60% 60–70% 70–80% Hale: 50–60%
Governor before election
William Plumer
Democratic-Republican
Elected Governor
Samuel Bell
Democratic-Republican

The 1819 New Hampshire gubernatorial election was held on March 9, 1819.

Incumbent Democratic-Republican Governor William Plumer did not run for re-election.

Democratic-Republican nominee Samuel Bell defeated Federalist nominee William Hale.

== General election ==
=== Candidates ===
- Samuel Bell, Democratic-Republican, associate justice of the New Hampshire Superior Court of Judicature
- William Hale, Federalist, former U.S. Representative

=== Results ===
1819 New Hampshire gubernatorial election (Note: Some sources give slightly different results. The result given is taken from the New Hampshire Senate Journal.)
Party	Candidate	Votes	%	±%
Democratic-Republican	Samuel Bell	13,761	56.71%	
Federalist	William Hale	8,660	35.69%	
Scattering		1,844 (Note: A New Nation Votes indicates around 926 of the scattering votes were cast for David L. Morril.)	7.60%	
Majority		5,101	21.02%	
Turnout		24,265		
Democratic-Republican hold		Swing		
