= 1828 New Hampshire gubernatorial election =

- March 11, 1828
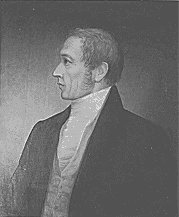

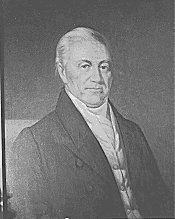
Nominee	John Bell	Benjamin Pierce
Party	Anti-Jacksonian	Jacksonian
Popular vote	21,149	18,672
Percentage	53.01%	46.80%
- County results Bell: 50–60% 70–80% Pierce: 50–60% 60–70%
Governor before election
Benjamin Pierce
Jacksonian
Elected Governor
John Bell
Anti-Jacksonian

The 1828 New Hampshire gubernatorial election was held on March 11, 1828.

Incumbent Jackson Governor Benjamin Pierce was defeated by Adams nominee John Bell.

== General election ==
=== Candidates ===
- John Bell, "Adams", sheriff of Rockingham County
- Benjamin Pierce, "Jackson", incumbent Governor

Party labels were in flux following the splitting of the Democratic-Republican Party into groups following the 1824 presidential election. Contemporary newspapers refer to Pierce as a "friend of Andrew Jackson" and Bell as a "friend of John Quincy Adams" or "supporter of the Administration" although others suggested Pierce had won the support of many Adams supporters.

=== Results ===
1828 New Hampshire gubernatorial election (Note: Some sources give slightly different results. The result given is taken from the New Hampshire Senate Journal.)
Party	Candidate	Votes	%	±%
Anti-Jacksonian	John Bell	21,149	53.01%	
Jacksonian	Benjamin Pierce (incumbent)	18,672	46.80%	
Scattering		76	0.19%	
Majority		2,477	6.21%	
Turnout		39,897		
Anti-Jacksonian gain from Jacksonian		Swing		
