= John Bell (New Hampshire politician) =

American politician (1765–1836)

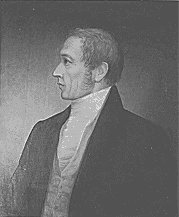
- Photo of 1875 portrait by U.D. Tenney. Displayed at New Hampshire State House.

12th Governor of New Hampshire
- In office June 5, 1828 – June 4, 1829
- Preceded by: Benjamin Pierce
- Succeeded by: Benjamin Pierce

Member of the New Hampshire Senate
- In office 1803–1804

Member of the New Hampshire House of Representatives
- In office 1799

Personal details
- Born: July 20, 1765 Londonderry, Province of New Hampshire, British America
- Died: March 22, 1836 (aged 70) Chester, New Hampshire, U.S.
- Resting place: Chester Village Cemetery
- Party: Federalist Party; Democratic-Republican Party; National Republican Party
- Spouse: Persis Thorn (m. 1803)
- Relations: Samuel Bell (brother)
- Children: 10, including Charles
- Occupation: Merchant; farmer; businessman

John Bell (July 20, 1765 – March 22, 1836) was the 12th governor of New Hampshire from 1828 to 1829. Samuel Bell, a brother, was the eighth governor of New Hampshire from 1819 to 1823.

John Bell was born on July 20, 1765, in Londonderry in the Province of New Hampshire, the son of John and Mary Ann (née Gilmore) Bell. John Bell Jr. (1730–1825) served in the New Hampshire Senate from 1786 to 1790 representing Rockingham County.

He received a limited education by several New Hampshire common schools, and became a merchant, attaining success by trading and selling New Hampshire products in Canada and Canadian products in New Hampshire. He was later involved in other ventures, including farming and land speculation. Initially a Federalist, according to the New Hampshire Division of Historical Records, he entered state politics when he became a member of the New Hampshire House of Representatives from Londonderry in 1799. He later moved to Chester, and he married Persis Thom on December 25, 1803. They had 10 children; the youngest, Charles Henry Bell, served as governor from 1881 to 1883. From 1803 to 1804 Bell was a member of the New Hampshire State Senate, representing the 3rd District. He was also a member of the Executive Council of New Hampshire from 1817 to 1823, as a Democratic-Republican and the sheriff of Rockingham County from 1823 to 1828.

In 1828 Bell was a National Republican and a supporter of President John Quincy Adams. Adams lost to Andrew Jackson in that year's presidential election, but Bell defeated Jackson supporter Benjamin Pierce 21,149 to 18,672 votes in the election for governor.

While he was governor, the Exeter Savings Bank was chartered; several state manufacturing companies were incorporated; a number of schools were founded; and manufacturing within the state increased. Bell also promoted state support for formal agricultural education, and experimentation in farming and agriculture.

In 1829, Bell was defeated for re-election by Benjamin Pierce. He then retired from public service, and pursued actively his farming interests. He died in Chester on March 22, 1836, and was buried in the Village Cemetery in Chester.

== Sources ==
- Bastedo, Russell (1998). "Publications – A Guide to Likenesses of New Hampshire Officials and Governors on Public Display at the Legislative Office Building and the State House Concord, New Hampshire, to 1998". New Hampshire Division of Historical Records.
- "Index to Politicians: Bell". The Political Graveyard.
- "New Hampshire Governor John Bell". National Governors Association. Archived from the original on January 4, 2010.
- "New Hampshire Governor Samuel Bell". National Governors Association. Archived from the original on January 11, 2011.

Party political offices
Preceded by David L. Morril	National Republican nominee for Governor of New Hampshire; 1828, 1829	Succeeded by Timothy Upham
Political offices
Preceded by Benjamin Pierce	Governor of New Hampshire; 1828–1829	Succeeded by Benjamin Pierce
