= 1829 New Hampshire gubernatorial election =

- March 10, 1829
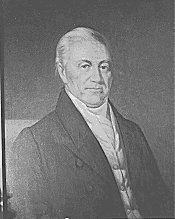

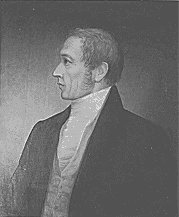
Nominee	Benjamin Pierce	John Bell
Party	Democratic	National Republican
Popular vote	22,615	19,583
Percentage	53.53%	46.35%
- County results Pierce: 50–60% 60–70% 70–80% Bell: 60–70%
Governor before election
John Bell
National Republican
Elected Governor
Benjamin Pierce
Democratic

The 1829 New Hampshire gubernatorial election was held on March 10, 1829.

Incumbent National Republican Governor John Bell was defeated by Democratic nominee Benjamin Pierce in a re-match of the previous year's election.

== General election ==
=== Candidates ===
- John Bell, National Republican, incumbent Governor
- Benjamin Pierce, Democratic, former Governor

=== Results ===
1829 New Hampshire gubernatorial election (Note: Some sources give slightly different results. The result given is taken from the New Hampshire Senate Journal.)
Party	Candidate	Votes	%	±%
Democratic	Benjamin Pierce	22,615	53.53%	
National Republican	John Bell (incumbent)	19,583	46.35%	
Scattering		48	0.11%	
Majority		3,032	7.18%	
Turnout		42,246		
Democratic gain from National Republican		Swing		
