= Peter Carleton =

American politician

Member of the U.S. House of Representatives from New Hampshire's at-large district
- In office March 4, 1807 – March 3, 1809
- Preceded by: Silas Betton
- Succeeded by: Daniel Blaisdell

Member of the New Hampshire House of Representatives
- In office 1803-1804

Personal details
- Born: September 19, 1755 Haverhill, Province of Massachusetts Bay, British America
- Died: April 29, 1828 (aged 72) Landaff, New Hampshire, U.S.
- Resting place: Landaff Center Cemetery; Landaff, Grafton County; New Hampshire
- Party: Democratic-Republican
- Spouse(s): Abigail Haseltine Carleton; Azubah Taylor Carleton
- Children: Prisilla Carleton; Frederick Carleton; Edward Carleton; Zalinda Carleton; George Carleton; John Carleton; Louise Carleton; George Carleton; Mary Carleton; James Carleton; Hannah Carleton; Carleton
- Parent(s): Peter Carleton; Hanna Gage Carleton
- Profession: Farmer; Banker; Politician

Military service
- Allegiance: United States of America
- Branch/service: Continental Army
- Years of service: January 1777 - December 31, 1779
- Rank: Sergeant Major
- Battles/wars: American Revolutionary War; Bemis Heights; Stillwater

Peter Carleton (September 19, 1755 – April 29, 1828) was an American politician, a farmer, and a United States representative from New Hampshire.

== Early life ==
Born in Haverhill in the Province of Massachusetts Bay, Carleton attended the public schools and engaged in agricultural pursuits. During the American Revolutionary War, he enlisted in January 1777 in Massachusetts, and served under Capt. John Blanchard and Col. James Wesson. He held the rank of Sergeant Major and served until December 31, 1779, when he was discharged at West Point, New York. During his service, he was in the battles of Bemis Heights and Stillwater.

== Career ==
Carleton moved to Landaff, Grafton County, New Hampshire, about 1789. He was a member of the New Hampshire constitutional convention in 1790. In 1803 the Coos Bank of Haverhill was chartered. One of the incorporators, he was also a director of the bank. A member of the New Hampshire House of Representatives in 1803 and 1804, he then served in the New Hampshire Senate in 1806 and 1807.

Elected as a Democratic-Republican to the Tenth Congress, Carleton served as United States Representative for New Hampshire from (March 4, 1807 – March 3, 1809).

== Death ==
Carleton died in Landaff, New Hampshire on April 29, 1828 (age 72 years, 223 days); and is interred at Landaff Center Cemetery, Landaff, Grafton County, New Hampshire.

== Family life ==
Son of Peter and Hanna Gage, Carleton married Abigail Haseltine on January 6, 1782, and they had seven children, Prisilla, Frederick, Edward, Zalinda, George, John, and Louise. He married Azubah Taylor on March 8, 1801, in Bath, Grafton County, New Hampshire; and they had five children, George, Mary, James, Hannah, and Carleton. He applied for a pension on April 9, 1818, for his service during the Revolutionary war and the pension was allowed.

== Slave ownership ==
According to research conducted by The Washington Post, Carleton owned a young female slave named Gin and had her baptised in 1764.

U.S. House of Representatives
Preceded by Silas Betton	Member of the U.S. House of Representatives from New Hampshire's at-large congressional district 1807-1809	Succeeded by Daniel Blaisdell
