= Ellen Francis Mason =

American author, civic leader and philanthropist

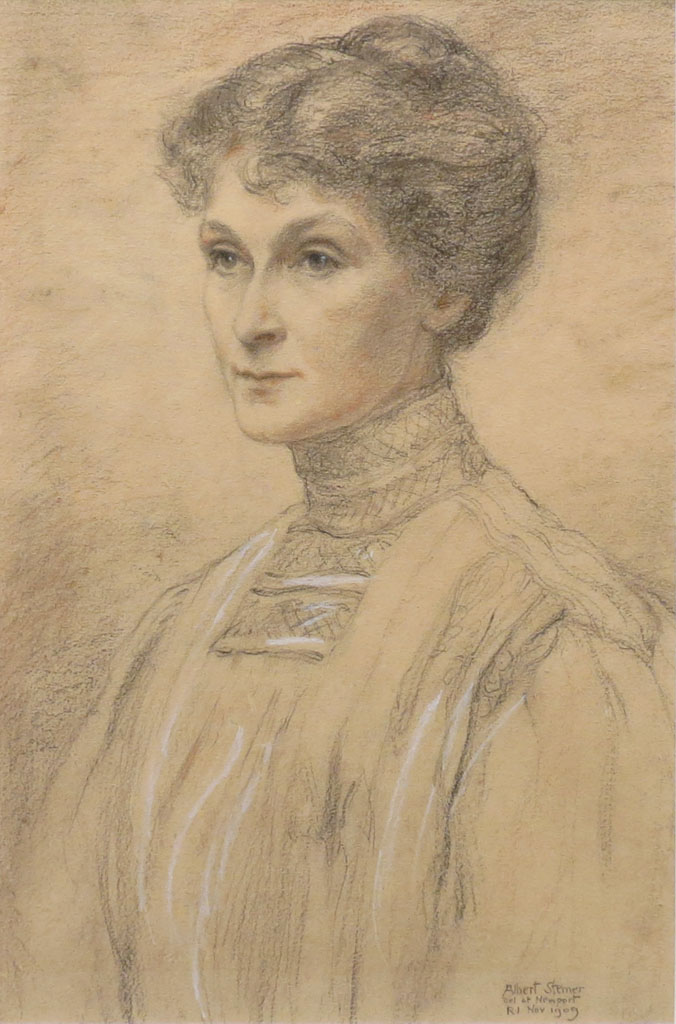
- portrait by Albert Sterner, 1909
- Born: 24 June 1846
- Died: 28 April 1930 (aged 83)
- Occupation: Translator
- Parent(s): Robert Means Mason

Ellen Francis Mason (June 24, 1846 – 1930) was a New England author, civic leader, trustee, and philanthropist. She is known today for her translations of Plato.

== Translations of Plato ==
Mason's annotated translations of Plato's dialogues in everyday English were published anonymously by Charles Scribner's Sons beginning in 1879, with a book titled Socrates that included translations of the Apology, Crito, and parts of Phaedo. The book also included an introduction by William Watson Goodwin, professor of Greek at Harvard University. This book was followed by A Day in Athens With Socrates (1883; includes translations from Protagoras and The Republic), Talks with Socrates About Life (1886; Gorgias and The Republic), and Talks with Athenian Youths (1891; Charmides, Lysis, Laches, Euthydemus, and Theaetetus). Although her name did not appear on the title pages of any of these books, her identity as the translator was known to librarians by 1880.

Her translations of Plato inspired Jo Walton to include her as a character renamed Aristomache in her novel The Just City, where she has been transported to an experimental community based on Plato's Republic. Walton writes in an author's note that Mason's life "is like a type-example of how difficult it was for women to lead a life of the mind" in her day.

== Personal life and organizational work ==
Mason was the daughter of Robert Means Mason (son of U.S. Senator Jeremiah Mason), and Sarah Ellen Francis. She lived in Beacon Hill in Boston, where she was a patron of the arts, an Associate (trustee) of Radcliffe College., and a friend to authors like Sarah Orne Jewett.

She spent summers in Newport, Rhode Island, where she lived in a mansion with her sister Ida Means Mason, and served as president of the Newport Civic League for many years. Her death was reported by the Newport Mercury on May 2, 1930. She and her sister (who died two years earlier) left estates of nearly $5 million to charity.
