= Benjamin Pierce (politician) =

American politician (1757–1839)

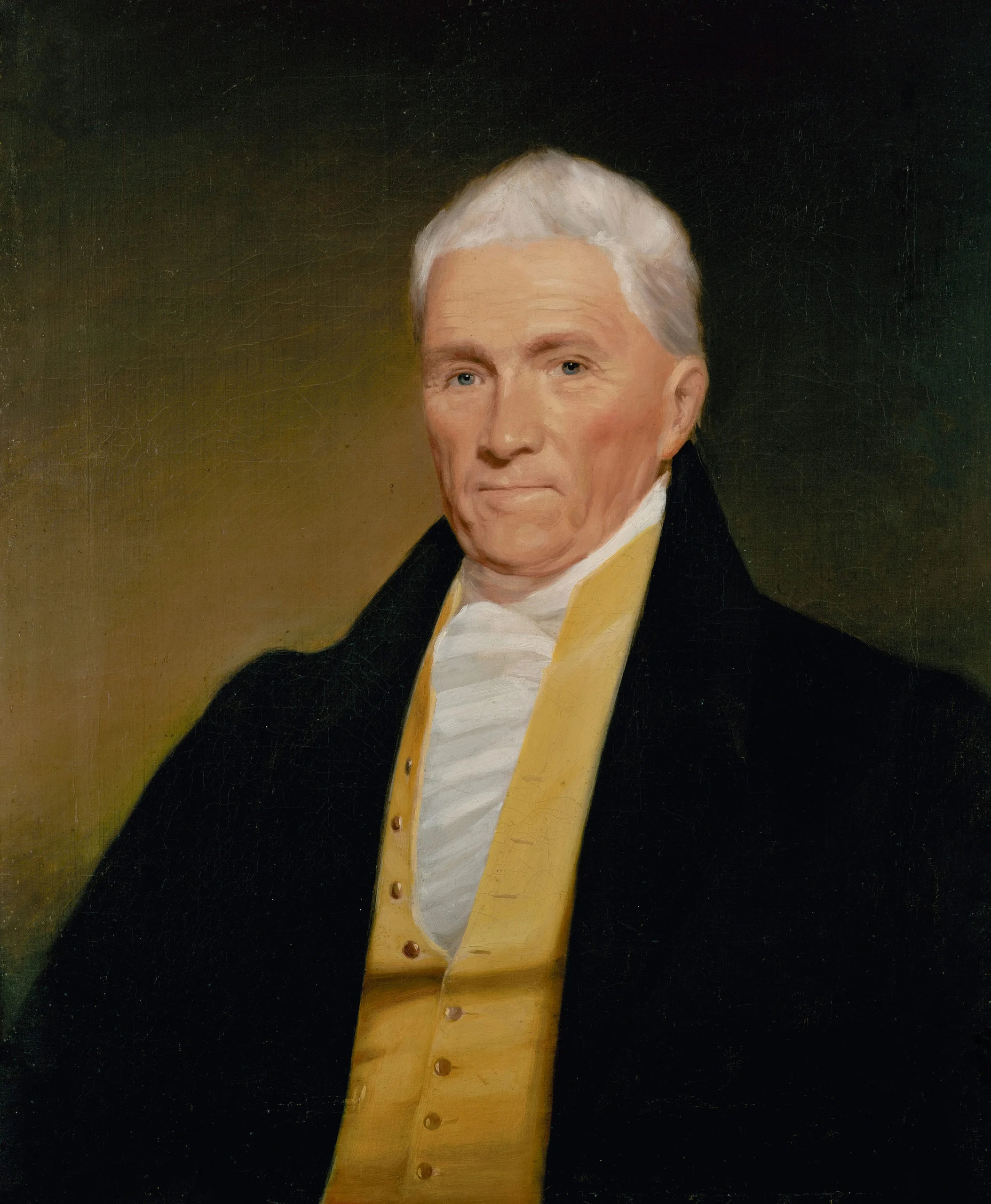
- Portrait by Henry Willard, c. 1830.

11th Governor of New Hampshire
- In office June 4, 1829 – June 3, 1830
- Preceded by: John Bell
- Succeeded by: Matthew Harvey
- In office June 7, 1827 – June 5, 1828
- Preceded by: David L. Morril
- Succeeded by: John Bell

Sheriff of Hillsborough County, New Hampshire
- In office 1818–1827
- Preceded by: Israel W. Kelly
- Succeeded by: Jacob Whittemore
- In office 1809–1813
- Preceded by: Moses Kelley
- Succeeded by: Israel W. Kelly

Member of the New Hampshire House of Representatives from Deering, Society Land, Henniker, and Hillsborough
- In office 1786–1788
- Preceded by: Robert Wallace
- Succeeded by: William Wallace

Personal details
- Born: December 25, 1757 Chelmsford, Province of Massachusetts Bay, British America
- Died: April 1, 1839 (aged 81) Hillsborough, New Hampshire, U.S.
- Resting place: Pine Hill Cemetery, Hillsborough, New Hampshire
- Party: Democratic-Republican Party
- Spouses: Elizabeth Andrews (m. 1787; died 1788); Anna Kendrick (m. 1790; died 1838)
- Children: 9, including Benjamin Kendrick Pierce and Franklin Pierce

Benjamin Pierce (December 25, 1757 – April 1, 1839) was an American politician who twice served as the governor of New Hampshire from 1827 to 1828 and from 1829 to 1830. Pierce fought during the American Revolutionary War before becoming a Democratic-Republican Party politician. He was the father of Franklin Pierce, the 14th president of the United States.

== Early life and military service ==
Benjamin Pierce was born in Chelmsford in the Province of Massachusetts Bay, the son of Benjamin and Elizabeth Merrill Pierce, as well as a direct descendant of Thomas Pierce (1618–1683), the grandson of Sir Richard Carew, who was born in Norwich, Norfolk, England and settled in the Massachusetts Bay Colony.

Pierce was a distinguished veteran of the Revolutionary War, serving in the 16th Continental Regiment, which was later renamed the 8th Massachusetts Regiment. He was present at the Battle of Bunker Hill. He was promoted to Ensign in the 1st Massachusetts Regiment for bravery during the Saratoga campaign.

Following the war, he moved to Hillsborough, New Hampshire, where he built the Pierce family home, and was assigned the task of forming the Hillsborough County militia. In 1805, he was promoted to brigadier general and assigned command of the New Hampshire state militia.

== Political career ==
Prior to becoming governor, Pierce served in the New Hampshire House of Representatives from 1786 to 1788 and twice as Sheriff of Hillsborough County, from 1809 to 1812 and later from 1818 to 1827.

He was a delegate to the state Constitutional Convention in September 1791 and a member of the Governor's Council from 1803 to 1809 and again in 1814.

Pierce served his first term as governor from 1827 to 1828, and later served from 1829 to 1830.

== Family life ==
Pierce's father died when he was six. He subsequently worked on his uncle's farm until enlisting in Ebenezer Bridge's Massachusetts regiment on April 26, 1775.

On May 24, 1787, he married Elizabeth Andrews. Their daughter, named Elizabeth Andrews Pierce, was born August 9, 1788, but the elder Elizabeth died of childbirth complications four days later on August 13. Elizabeth Andrews Pierce (1788–1855) was the wife of United States Army General John McNeil Jr.

He married Anna Kendrick (born October 30, 1769) on February 1, 1790, at Amherst, New Hampshire. Together they had eight children:

- Benjamin Kendrick Pierce (August 29, 1790 – April 1, 1850), he became a lieutenant colonel and commandant of Fort Mackinac in Michigan. He married Josette Laframboise, daughter of prominent fur trader Magdelaine Laframboise.
- Nancy M. Pierce (November 2, 1792 – 1837)
- John Sullivan Pierce (November 5, 1796 – September 28, 1824), a first lieutenant in the Army who served at Fort Mackinac and other posts in Michigan, and died in Detroit.
- Harriet B. Pierce (1800–1837)
- Charles Grandison Pierce (1803–1828)
- Franklin Pierce (November 23, 1804 – October 8, 1869), 14th president of the United States
- Charlotte Pierce, d. in infancy.
- Henry Dearborn Pierce (September 19, 1812 – 1880)

They were married until her death on December 7, 1838. He died four months later in Hillsborough, and is buried in the town's Pine Hill Cemetery.

Benjamin Pierce was an original member of the Society of the Cincinnati and served as vice president of the Massachusetts state society from 1836 to 1839. With membership inherited through primogeniture, Pierce's eldest son, Benjamin Kendrick Pierce, succeeded him. Benjamin K. Pierce died in 1850 and was succeeded by Franklin Pierce, the next eldest son of Benjamin Pierce. Franklin Pierce died in 1869 and was succeeded by Henry Dearborn Pierce, the youngest son of Benjamin Pierce. Henry Dearborn Pierce was succeeded by his son Kirk Dearborn Pierce, the grandson of Benjamin Pierce.

== See also ==
- New Hampshire historical marker no. 65: Pierce Homestead

== Sources ==
- Bell, J. L. (June 2015). "Benjamin Pierce's Story of Bunker Hill". Boston 1775.
- New Hampshire Division of Historical Resources Biography
- Massachusetts Society of the Cincinnati Profiles online at the New England Historic Genealogical Society — possible new link? (subscription required)

Party political offices
First	Democratic nominee for Governor of New Hampshire; 1826, 1827, 1828, 1829	Succeeded by Matthew Harvey
Political offices
Preceded by David L. Morril	Governor of New Hampshire; 1827–1828	Succeeded by John Bell
Preceded by John Bell	Governor of New Hampshire; 1829–1830	Succeeded by Matthew Harvey
