= Caleb Ellis =

American politician

Member of the U.S. House of Representatives from New Hampshire's at-large district
- In office March 4, 1805 – March 3, 1807
- Preceded by: Jacob Hart Ela
- Succeeded by: Evarts Worcester Farr

Justice of the Superior Court of New Hampshire
- In office 1813 – May 6, 1816 (death)

Personal details
- Born: April 16, 1767 Walpole, Province of Massachusetts Bay, British America
- Died: May 6, 1816 (aged 49) Claremont, New Hampshire, U.S.
- Resting place: Broad Street Cemetery; Claremont, Sullivan County; New Hampshire, U.S.
- Party: Federalist
- Education: Harvard University
- Profession: Attorney, Politician

Caleb Ellis (April 16, 1767 – May 6, 1816) was an American politician and lawyer who served as a member of the United States representative, representing the state's at-large congressional district.

== Early life and education ==
Ellis was born in Walpole in the Province of Massachusetts Bay. After graduating from Harvard University in 1793, he worked as a school teacher in Dedham, Massachusetts. He later studied law and was admitted to the Massachusetts Bar Association. He then moved to Newport, New Hampshire, and eventually to Claremont, New Hampshire.

== Career ==
Ellis was a member of the New Hampshire House of Representatives in 1803.

Elected as a Federalist to the Ninth Congress, Ellis was United States Representative for the state of New Hampshire from March 4, 1805, to March 3, 1807. After service in Congress, he was member of the New Hampshire Governor's council in 1809 and 1810. In addition, he served in the New Hampshire Senate in 1811. He was a presidential elector on the Clinton and Ingersoll ticket in 1812.

Appointed Justice of the Superior Court of New Hampshire in 1813, Ellis held the office until his death.

Ellis was elected a member of the American Antiquarian Society in 1815.

== Death ==
Ellis died in Claremont, New Hampshire, on May 6, 1816, at the age of 49. He is interred at the Broad Street Cemetery in Claremont, New Hampshire.

U.S. House of Representatives
Preceded by Clifton Clagett	Member of the U.S. House of Representatives from New Hampshire's at-large congressional district 1805-1807	Succeeded by Clement Storer
