= Clifton Clagett =

American judge

Member of the U.S. House of Representatives from New Hampshire's at-large seat C
- In office March 4, 1817 – March 3, 1821
- Preceded by: William Hale
- Succeeded by: Matthew Harvey

Member of the U.S. House of Representatives from New Hampshire's at-large seat E
- In office March 4, 1803 – March 3, 1805
- Preceded by: Seat established
- Succeeded by: Caleb Ellis

Member of the New Hampshire House of Representatives
- In office 1816

Personal details
- Born: December 3, 1762 Portsmouth, Province of New Hampshire, British America
- Died: January 25, 1829 (aged 66) Amherst, New Hampshire, U.S.
- Resting place: Meadow View Cemetery; Amherst, New Hampshire
- Citizenship: U.S.
- Party: Federalist; Democratic-Republican
- Spouse: Margaret McQueston Clagett
- Children: Elizabeth Clagett Greeley; Margaretta Clagett Carlton; Cornelia Clifton Clagett; Susan Clagett; Frances G. Clagett; Emma C. Clagett; Lucretia Clagett Lawrence
- Parent(s): Wyseman Clagett; Lettice (Mitchell) Clagettt
- Profession: Lawyer; Politician; Judge

Clifton Clagett (December 3, 1762 – January 25, 1829) was an American lawyer and politician from New Hampshire. He served as a member of the New Hampshire House of Representatives, the United States House of Representatives and as a New Hampshire Supreme Court justice.

== Early life ==
Clagett was born in Portsmouth in the Province of New Hampshire, the son of Wyseman Clagett and Lettice (Mitchell) Clagettt. He was admitted to the bar and commenced practice in Litchfield, New Hampshire in 1787.

== Political career ==
Elected as a Federalist candidate to the Eighth Congress, Clagett served as a United States representative for the state of New Hampshire from March 4, 1803 – March 3, 1805. He was appointed a justice of the peace and quorum in 1808. In addition, he was appointed judge of probate for Hillsborough County, New Hampshire in 1810 and served until his resignation in 1812, having been appointed to another judicial position.

Clagett moved to Amherst, New Hampshire in 1812, and was appointed a judge of the New Hampshire Supreme Court in that year. He also served as a member of the New Hampshire House of Representatives in 1816. Elected as a Democratic-Republican to the Fifteenth Congress and reelected to the Sixteenth Congress, Clagett served as a United States representative from (March 4, 1817 – March 3, 1821). After leaving Congress, he was appointed judge of probate on August 5, 1823, and held the office until his death.

== Death ==
Clagett died in Amherst on January 25, 1829 (age 66 years, 53 days). He is interred at Meadow View Cemetery in Amherst, New Hampshire.

== Family life ==
Married to Margaret McQueston, on November 19, 1834, Clagett had eleven children, Wyseman, William, Elizabeth, Margaretta, Cornelia Clifton, Susan, Frances G., Emma C., Harriet, Frances, and Lucretia.

U.S. House of Representatives
Preceded by New Seat	New Hampshire's At-large Congressional District; 1803—1805	Succeeded by Caleb Ellis
Preceded by William Hale	New Hampshire's at-large Congressional District; 1817—1821	Succeeded by Matthew Harvey
