= 1827 New Hampshire gubernatorial election =

- March 13, 1827
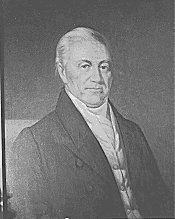

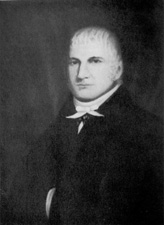
Nominee	Benjamin Pierce	David L. Morril
Party	Jacksonian	Anti-Jacksonian
Popular vote	23,695	2,529
Percentage	86.44%	9.23%
- County results Pierce: 60–70% 80–90% 90–100%
Governor before election
David L. Morril
Anti-Jacksonian
Elected Governor
Benjamin Pierce
Jacksonian

The 1827 New Hampshire gubernatorial election was held on March 13, 1827.

Incumbent Adams Governor David L. Morril did not stand for re-election, although he won a number of scattering votes.

Jackson nominee Benjamin Pierce was elected without serious opposition.

== Democratic-Republican nomination ==
The Democratic-Republican members of the New Hampshire Legislature met in caucus in summer 1826 at Concord and chose Benjamin Pierce over Matthew Harvey, E. Bartlett, and incumbent Governor Morril.

== General election ==
=== Candidates ===
- David L. Morril, "Adams", incumbent Governor
- Benjamin Pierce, "Jackson", sheriff of Hillsborough County

Party labels were in flux following the splitting of the Democratic-Republican Party into groups following the 1824 presidential election. Contemporary newspapers refer to Morril as a "friend of John Quincy Adams" or "supporter of the Administration" and Pierce as a "friend of Andrew Jackson".

Morril declined a re-election.

=== Results ===
1827 New Hampshire gubernatorial election (Note: Some sources give slightly different results. The result given is taken from the New Hampshire Senate Journal.)
Party	Candidate	Votes	%	±%
Jacksonian	Benjamin Pierce	23,695	86.44%	
Anti-Jacksonian	David L. Morril (incumbent)	2,529	9.23%	
Scattering		1,187	4.33%	
Majority		21,166	77.21%	
Turnout		27,411		
Jacksonian gain from Anti-Jacksonian		Swing		
