= Samuel Bell (New Hampshire politician) =

American politician (1770–1850)

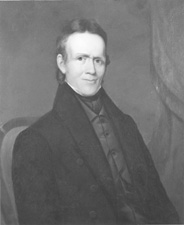

8th Governor of New Hampshire
- In office June 3, 1819 – June 5, 1823
- Preceded by: William Plumer
- Succeeded by: Levi Woodbury

United States Senator from New Hampshire
- In office March 4, 1823 – March 3, 1835
- Preceded by: David L. Morril
- Succeeded by: Henry Hubbard

Member of the New Hampshire Senate
- In office 1807–1809

Member of the New Hampshire House of Representatives
- In office 1804

Personal details
- Born: February 9, 1770 Londonderry, Province of New Hampshire, British America
- Died: December 23, 1850 (aged 80) Chester, New Hampshire, U.S.
- Party: Democratic-Republican; National Republican; Whig
- Relations: John (brother)
- Education: Dartmouth College

Samuel Bell (February 9, 1770 – December 23, 1850) was an American politician and lawyer who served as the eighth governor of New Hampshire from 1819 to 1823, and as the United States senator for New Hampshire from 1823 to 1835.

== Early life and education ==
Samuel Bell was born on February 9, 1770, in Londonderry, New Hampshire, to John Bell and Mary Ann (Gilmore) Bell. Until he was eighteen, Bell worked on his father's farm, and was educated at common schools during winter seasons. Wishing to undertake higher education, Bell began studying Latin in April 1788, and later enrolled at the New Ipswich Academy. From October 1790 to April 1791, he was a teacher in Londonderry, and in the May following entered the sophomore class at Dartmouth College. Graduating in 1793, Bell proceeded to study law and was admitted to the Hillsborough bar in September 1796, after which he worked as a lawyer in Francestown, New Hampshire.

== Career ==
=== Early career ===
Bell first entered politics when he became a member of the New Hampshire House of Representatives in 1804; he was re-elected in the two following years, during both he was the Speaker of the House. In 1806, he became the President of The Bank of Hillsborough, but by the end of his tenure in that position in 1810, it was the only New Hampshire bank to fail between 1792 and 1840. Bell was offered to become the New Hampshire Attorney General in 1807, but declined because he felt the salary was too small. He was a member of the New Hampshire Senate from 1807 to 1809, and was the President of that body during those two years, and from 1809 to 1811 was in the Executive Council of New Hampshire. Bell was appointed to be the trustee of Dartmouth College from 1808 to 1811. However, in 1809, due to a severe lung problem which showed the signs of tuberculosis, he was advised by his doctors to take an extended vacation away from the practice of law and to travel, which he did according to The American Quarterly Review; also according to this source, Bell spent parts of several following years traveling to relatively distant areas, primarily on horseback, which gradually recovered his health. However, the Biographical Director of the Library of Congress says that Bell continued practicing law between 1810 and 1812, moving to Amherst in 1810 and to Chester at those respective times.

=== State Supreme Court and Governor of New Hampshire ===
In 1816, Bell was elevated to the New Hampshire Supreme Court as an associate justice, but resigned in 1819 to become Governor of New Hampshire on June 3, 1819, as a Democratic-Republican In the election for the governorship that year, Bell had secured 13,751 of 24,265 votes. He was re-elected in 1820, 1821, and 1822; in 1822, he gained 22,934 out of 23,980 votes cast, which was the largest share of votes cast for a governor candidate of New Hampshire since John Taylor Gilman's victory in 1795. In all re-election campaigns, Bell faced token opposition. Whilst governor, crime within the state was reduced, and New Hampshire's industry was promoted and developed. In June 1822, Bell declined to run again for governor, and he left the governorship on June 4, 1823.

=== United States Senate and later life ===
On March 4, 1823, Bell was elected to the United States Senate as an Adams-Clay Republican; by the end of his service in the Senate on March 3, 1835, he was affiliated with the Adams Party, the Anti-Jacksonian Party, and in 1834 the Whig Party. He was re-elected in 1829, and during the 23rd United States Congress, Bell was the chairman of the Committee on Claims. After he left the Senate, Bell retired from public life, and retreated to a farm in Chester that he had purchased in 1813. He spent his later years cultivating his farm, and died on December 23, 1850, in Chester, and was interred in the Village Cemetery.

== Personal life ==
In November 1797, Bell married Mehitable Bowen Dana, and together they had six children; four sons: Samuel, John, James and Luther; two daughters: Mary-Anne, and another who died in infancy. In August 1810, Dana died, and in July 1828, Bell married Lucy G. Smith, with whom he had four sons. In 1820, he was awarded a Doctor of Laws from Bowdoin College. John, his brother, served as Governor of New Hampshire from 1828 to 1829, and Bell was also the uncle of Charles Henry Bell, who was the governor from 1881 to 1883.

Bell died in Chester, New Hampshire, at the age of 80. He is buried in Chester Village Cemetery, Rockingham, New Hampshire.

== Sources ==
- Bastedo, Russell (1998). "Governor John Bell, Publications – A Guide to Likenesses of New Hampshire Officials and Governors on Public Display at the Legislative Office Building and the State House Concord, New Hampshire, to 1998". New Hampshire Division of Historical Records.
- Bastedo, Russell (1998). "Governor Samuel Bell, Publications – A Guide to Likenesses of New Hampshire Officials and Governors on Public Display at the Legislative Office Building and the State House Concord, New Hampshire, to 1998". New Hampshire Division of Historical Records.
- Edwards, B; S Riddel (1842). The American Quarterly Review: Volume XIV. Boston: The American Education Society.
- "New Hampshire Governor John Bell". National Governors Association. Archived from the original on January 4, 2010.

Party political offices
Preceded by William Plumer	Democratic-Republican nominee for Governor of New Hampshire; 1819, 1820, 1821, 1822	Succeeded by Samuel Dinsmoor
Political offices
Preceded by William Plumer	Governor of New Hampshire; 1819–1823	Succeeded by Levi Woodbury
U.S. Senate
Preceded by David L. Morril	U.S. senator (Class 2) from New Hampshire; 1823–1835; Served alongside: John F. Parrott, Levi Woodbury, Isaac Hill	Succeeded by Henry Hubbard
