= Josiah Bartlett Jr. =

American politician (1768–1838)

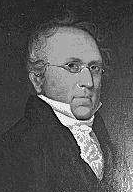

Member of the U.S. House of Representatives from New Hampshire's at-Large district
- In office March 4, 1811 – March 3, 1813
- Preceded by: Daniel Blaisdell
- Succeeded by: Bradbury Cilley

Member of the New Hampshire Senate
- In office 1824–1825

Member of the New Hampshire Senate
- In office 1809–1810

Personal details
- Born: August 29, 1768 Kingston, Province of New Hampshire, British America
- Died: April 16, 1838 (aged 69) Stratham, New Hampshire, U.S.
- Resting place: Old Congregational Cemetery; Stratham, New Hampshire
- Citizenship: United States
- Party: Democratic-Republican
- Spouse(s): Sarah Ann Wingate Bartlett; Hannah Bartlett
- Children: Mary T. Bartlett Rollins
- Parent(s): Josiah Bartlett; Mary Bartlett
- Education: Phillips Exeter Academy
- Profession: Physician; Politician

Josiah Bartlett Jr. (August 29, 1768 – April 16, 1838) was an American medical doctor and politician from New Hampshire. He served as a United States representative from New Hampshire and as a member of the New Hampshire Senate during the early 1800s.

== Early life ==
Bartlett was born to Josiah Bartlett and Mary Bartlett in Kingston in the Province of New Hampshire. He followed his father as both a physician and political leader. After graduating from Phillips Exeter Academy in 1784, he studied medicine and started a medical practice in Stratham.

== Career ==
Bartlett was a presidential elector in the 1792 election, supporting George Washington. He served in the State Senate from 1809 to 1810. Elected as a Democratic-Republican candidate, he served as a United States Representative for the state of New Hampshire from March 4, 1811, to March 3, 1813. He was elected a Fellow of the American Academy of Arts and Sciences in 1811. Following his Congressional service, Bartlett resumed the practice of medicine and was elected again to the New Hampshire State Senate, serving from 1824 to 1825. He served as a presidential elector in the 1824 election, supporting John Quincy Adams. He continued the practice of medicine in Stratham.

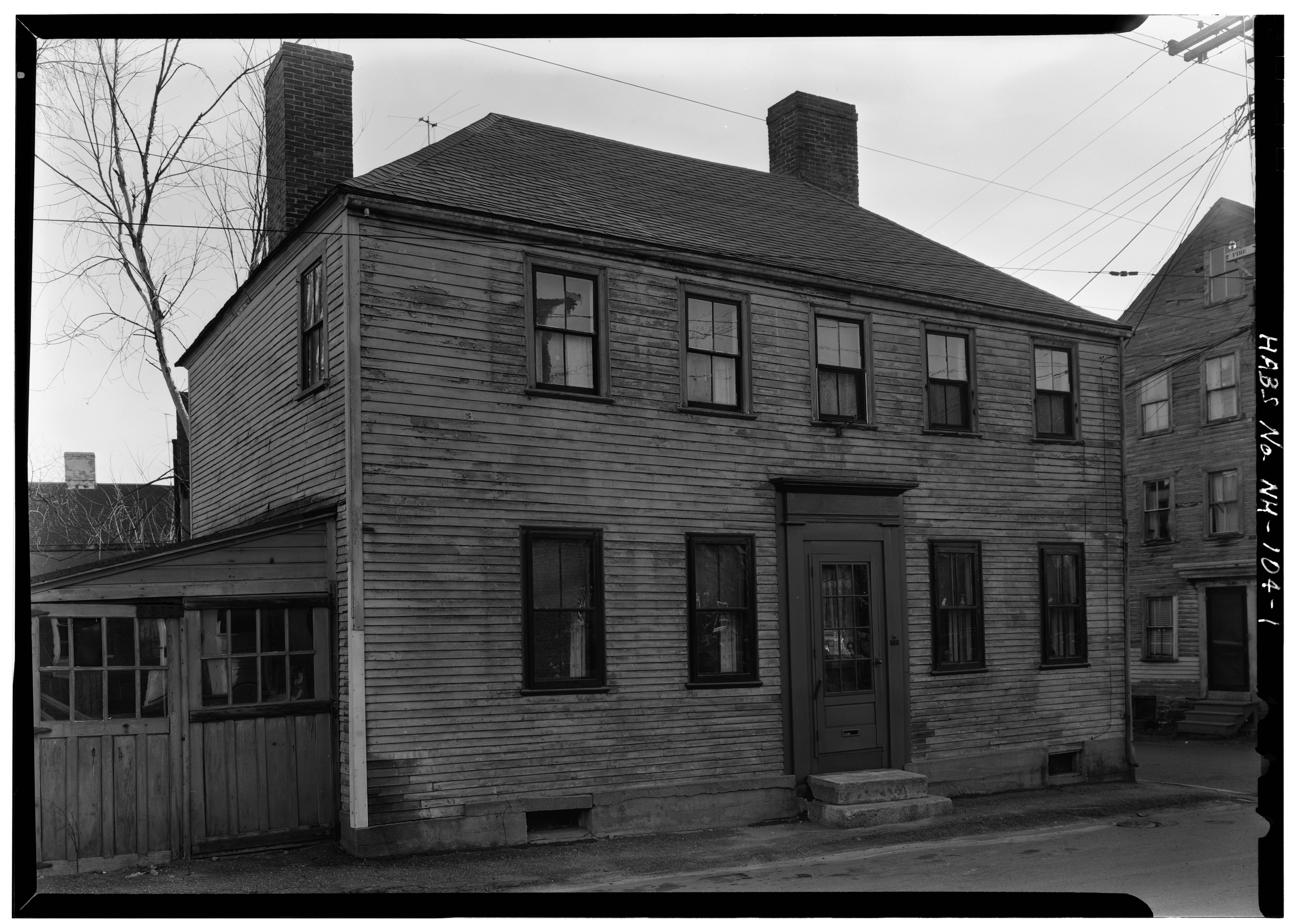
Home of Josiah Bartlett Jr., at 420 Court St., Portsmouth, New Hampshire. The house has been restored and is known as the Reuben Shapley House, after its builder. It is preserved as part of the Strawbery Banke Museum complex.

== Personal life ==
Bartlett died in Stratham, Rockingham County, New Hampshire, on April 16, 1838 (age 69 years, 230 days). He is interred at Old Congregational Cemetery in Stratham.

Bartlett was the son of Josiah Bartlett, Governor of the state of New Hampshire and signer of the Declaration of Independence.

U.S. House of Representatives
Preceded by Daniel Blaisdell	Member of the U.S. House of Representatives from New Hampshire's at-large congressional district 1811–1813	Succeeded by Bradbury Cilley
