= Daniel Blaisdell =

American politician (1762-1833)

Member of the U.S. House of Representatives from New Hampshire's At-Large district
- In office March 4, 1809 – March 3, 1811
- Preceded by: Peter Carleton
- Succeeded by: Josiah Bartlett, Jr.

Member of the New Hampshire House of Representatives
- In office 1824–1825

Member of the New Hampshire Senate
- In office 1814–1815

Member of the New Hampshire House of Representatives
- In office 1812–1813

Personal details
- Born: January 22, 1762 Amesbury, Province of Massachusetts Bay, British America
- Died: January 10, 1833 (aged 70) Canaan, New Hampshire, U.S.
- Resting place: Wells Cemetery; Canaan, New Hampshire
- Citizenship: U.S.
- Party: Federalist Party
- Spouse: Sally Springer Blaisdell
- Children: 12
- Profession: Teacher; Farmer; Politician; Judge

Military service
- Allegiance: United States of America
- Branch/service: Continental Army; United States Army
- Years of service: 1776-1777; 1812-1812
- Battles/wars: American Revolutionary War; War of 1812

Daniel Blaisdell (January 22, 1762 – January 10, 1833) was an American teacher, farmer, politician and judge. He served as a United States representative from New Hampshire, as a member of the New Hampshire Senate and as a member of the New Hampshire House of Representatives during the early 1800s.

== Early life ==
Born in Amesbury in the Province of Massachusetts Bay, Blaisdell was the son of Elijah and Mary (Sargent) Blaisdell. He attended the public schools and served in the American Revolutionary War from August 1776 - August 1777. After his war service, Blaisdell moved to Canaan, New Hampshire, in 1780. He taught school, engaged in agricultural pursuits and acquired some legal knowledge.

== Political career ==
He was a member of the New Hampshire House of Representatives in 1793, 1795, and 1799 and served as a member of the Governor's council from 1803 to 1808. He was a moderator of Canaan in 1808, 1809, 1812, 1822, 1824, 1826, and 1830.

Elected as a Federalist candidate to the United States House of Representatives, he served in the Eleventh Congress from March 4, 1809, to March 3, 1811. After leaving Congress, he served in the War of 1812. He again being a member of the New Hampshire House of Representatives, and served in that capacity during 1812, 1813, 1824, and 1825. He served as selectman of Canaan in 1813, 1815, and 1818. He resumed his agricultural pursuits, and was a member of the New Hampshire Senate in 1814 and 1815. He served as Chief Justice of the court of sessions in 1822.

== Death ==
Blaisdell died in Canaan, Grafton County, New Hampshire, on January 10, 1833, at age 70. He is interred at Wells Cemetery in Canaan.

== Family life ==
On January 19, 1782, Blaisdell married Sally Springer and they had nine sons and three daughters, including Johnathan, Timothy, Parritt, and Elijah.

U.S. House of Representatives
Preceded by Peter Carleton	Member of the U.S. House of Representatives from New Hampshire's at-large congressional district 1809–1811	Succeeded by Josiah Bartlett Jr.
