= Nahum Parker =

American politician (1760–1839)

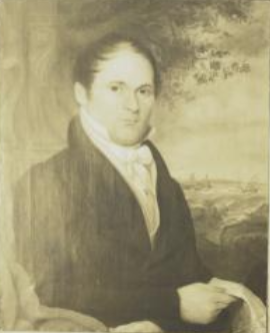

United States Senator from New Hampshire
- In office March 4, 1807 – June 1, 1810
- Preceded by: William Plumer
- Succeeded by: Charles Cutts

Member of the New Hampshire House of Representatives
- In office 1794–1804; 1806–1807

Personal details
- Born: March 4, 1760 Shrewsbury, Massachusetts
- Died: November 12, 1839 (aged 79) Fitzwilliam, New Hampshire
- Party: Democratic-Republican

Nahum Parker (March 4, 1760 – November 12, 1839) was a United States senator from New Hampshire.

Parker was born in Shrewsbury, Massachusetts. During the Revolutionary War he served in the Continental Army at the Battle of Saratoga in 1777. He settled in Fitzwilliam, New Hampshire in 1786, was a member of the board of selectmen from 1790 to 1794 and clerk and town treasurer from 1792 to 1815.

Parker was a member of the New Hampshire House of Representatives from 1794 to 1804 and in 1806–1807; in 1804 and 1805 he was a member of the Governor's council. He was elected as a Democratic-Republican to the U.S. Senate and served from March 4, 1807, to June 1, 1810, when he resigned.

From 1807 to 1813, Parker was a justice of the Court of Common Pleas for Cheshire and Sullivan Counties. He was associate justice of the western circuit from 1813 to 1816 and a judge of the court of sessions of Cheshire County in 1821 and of the court of common pleas of Hillsborough County in 1822. He was a member of the New Hampshire Senate and its president in 1828.

Parker died in Fitzwilliam, New Hampshire in 1839, aged 79, and was interred in the Town Cemetery.

U.S. Senate
Preceded by William Plumer	U.S. senator (Class 3) from New Hampshire; 1807–1810; Served alongside: Nicholas Gilman	Succeeded by Charles Cutts
