= Charles Cutts =

American politician (1769–1846)

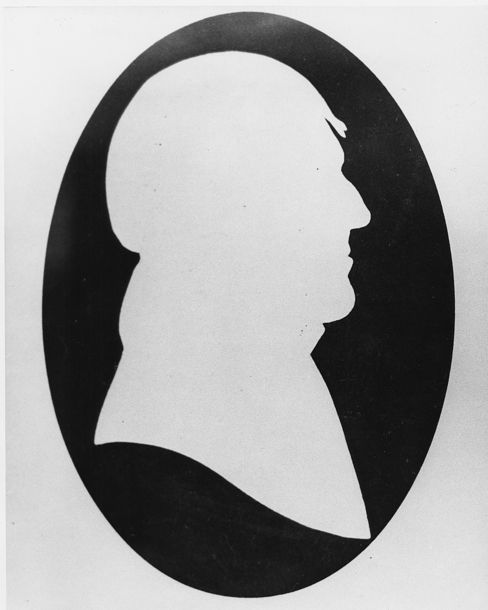

2nd Secretary of the United States Senate
- In office October 12, 1814 – December 12, 1825
- Preceded by: Samuel Allyne Otis
- Succeeded by: Walter Lowrie

United States Senator from New Hampshire
- In office April 2, 1813 – June 15, 1813
- Preceded by: Himself
- Succeeded by: Jeremiah Mason
- In office June 21, 1810 – March 3, 1813
- Preceded by: Nahum Parker
- Succeeded by: Himself

Speaker of the New Hampshire House of Representatives
- In office 1810–1811
- Preceded by: George B. Upham
- Succeeded by: Clement Storer
- In office 1807–1809
- Preceded by: Samuel Bell
- Succeeded by: George B. Upham

Member of the New Hampshire House of Representatives
- In office 1803–1811

Personal details
- Born: January 31, 1769 Portsmouth, New Hampshire
- Died: January 25, 1846 (aged 76) Lewinsville, Virginia
- Party: Federalist

Charles Cutts (January 31, 1769 – January 25, 1846) was an attorney and politician from New Hampshire. Among the offices in which he served were Speaker of the New Hampshire House of Representatives, United States Senator and Secretary of the United States Senate.

== Early life ==
Cutts was born in Portsmouth on January 31, 1769, the son of Samuel Cutts and Anna Holyoke. He was educated in Portsmouth and Phillips Academy, Andover, MA, and attended Harvard University, from which he graduated in 1789. During his college years, Cutts was selected for membership in Phi Beta Kappa. After graduating, Cutts studied law with attorney John Pickering, was admitted to the bar in 1795, and practiced in Portsmouth.

Active in politics as a Federalist, Cutts was a member of the New Hampshire House of Representatives from 1803 to 1811. He served as Speaker of the House from 1807 to 1809, and again from 1810 to 1811.

== U.S. Senator ==
In 1810, Cutts was elected to the U.S. Senate to fill the vacancy caused by the resignation of Nahum Parker, and he served from June 21, 1810, to March 3, 1813. Because Congressional sessions began in December, when the state legislature was not in session, Cutts completed his final New Hampshire House term and term as Speaker, which ended in early 1811. The New Hampshire General Court failed to elect a successor for the term that began on March 4, 1813, so Governor William Plumer appointed Cutts, who served from April 2, 1813, to June 10, 1813, when a successor was elected.

While Cutts served in the Senate, the federal government was concerned with prosecuting the War of 1812 and then beginning the post-war recovery. Cutts was appointed to several select committees concerned with the finance and the economy, foreign trade, and military defense, and frequently served as chairman.

== Later life ==
Cutts remained in Washington, D.C. after leaving office. In 1814 he was elected to serve as Secretary of the United States Senate, and he held the position from October 12, 1814, to December 12, 1825. As Secretary, Cutts oversaw preparations for the Senate's move from its temporary downtown quarters in the Patent Office, which had been necessitated by the burning of the US Capitol during the War of 1812 to the hastily erected "Brick Capitol", a building which was located on the site of the current US Supreme Court Building. Following that move, Cutts planned the move of the Senate back into the Capitol, which took place in 1819.

In retirement, Cutts moved to Fairfax County, Virginia, and eventually settled in Lewinsville. He died in Lewinsville on January 25, 1846, and was buried in a private cemetery near Lewinsville.

== Family ==
Cutts' mother was the daughter of Edward Holyoke and the sister of Edward Augustus Holyoke.

In 1812, Cutts married Lucy Henry Southall (d. 1868), a descendant of Patrick Henry and the niece of James Monroe's wife Elizabeth. Their children included Stephen (b. 1813), Samuel (b. 1815), and Martha (b. 1817). Another daughter, Priscilla Olive, died as an infant.

Charles Cutts was the cousin of Richard Cutts, who served in Congress from the portion of Massachusetts that later became the state of Maine. Richard Cutts was the husband of Dolley Madison's sister Anna.

== Attempts to locate portrait ==
Cutts is one of approximately 50 former senators for whom the U.S. Senate's photo historian has no likeness on file. Attempts to locate one have proved unsuccessful.

== Sources ==
=== Books ===
- Bell, Charles Henry (1894). The Bench and Bar of New Hampshire. Boston, MA: Houghton, Mifflin and Company.
- Howard, Cecil Hampden Cutts (1892). Genealogy of the Cutts Family in America. Albany, NY: J. Munsell's Sons.
- Phi Beta Kappa Society of Massachusetts (1839). A Catalogue of the Fraternity of Phi Beta Kappa, Alpha of Massachusetts. Cambridge, MA: Folson, Wells, and Thurston. p. 8.

=== Internet ===
- "Charles Cutts, Secretary of the Senate, 1814-1825". U.S. Senate Historical Office. United States Senate.
- University of Virginia Library. "A Guide to the Papers of Richard Cutts, 1753-1886: Correspondence". Virginia Heritage. Charlottesville, VA: University of Virginia.
- US Senate Photo Historian. "Senators Not Represented in Senate Historical Office Photo Collection". Senate.gov. Washington, DC: Historian of the United States Senate.

=== Newspapers ===
- "Southall Family of Virginia". Richmond Journal. Richmond, VA. October 9, 1880 – via Sassytazzy's Online Genealogy Research Library.

Political offices
Preceded by Samuel Allyne Otis	Secretary of the United States Senate; October 12, 1814 – December 12, 1825	Succeeded by Walter Lowrie
U.S. Senate
Preceded by Nahum Parker	U.S. senator (Class 3) from New Hampshire; June 21, 1810 – March 3, 1813; April 2, 1813 – June 10, 1813; Served alongside: Nicholas Gilman	Succeeded by Jeremiah Mason
Political offices
Preceded by Samuel Bell	Speaker of the New Hampshire House of Representatives; 1807-1809	Succeeded by George Upham
Preceded by George Upham	Speaker of the New Hampshire House of Representatives; 1810-1811	Succeeded by Clement Storer
