= Obed Hall =

American politician (1757–1828)

Member of the U.S. House of Representatives from New Hampshire's at-large district
- In office March 4, 1811 – March 3, 1813
- Preceded by: William Hale
- Succeeded by: William Hale

Member of the New Hampshire Senate
- In office 1819

Member of the New Hampshire House of Representatives
- In office 1801-1802

Personal details
- Born: December 23, 1757 Raynham, Province of Massachusetts Bay, British America
- Died: April 1, 1828 (aged 70) Bartlett, New Hampshire, U.S.
- Resting place: Garland Ridge Cemetery (first); Evergreen Cemetery (second); Portland, Cumberland County, Maine, U.S.
- Party: Democratic-Republican
- Spouse(s): Abigail Dean Hall; Eliza Fox Hall
- Parent(s): Jonathan Hall; Lydia Hall
- Profession: Farmer; Innkeeper; Surveyor; Politician; Judge

Obed Hall (December 23, 1757 – April 1, 1828) was an American politician and a United States representative from New Hampshire.

== Early life ==
Born in Raynham in the Province of Massachusetts Bay, Hall later moved to Madbury and then to Bartlett, Carroll County, New Hampshire and engaged in agricultural pursuits.

== Career ==
Since travel at that time was hazardous, Hall became an innkeeper at his farm, which was considered benefactor to the traveling public rather than businessman. Mr Hall was one of two appointed as Surveyor of Highways petitioned the General Court in 1793 for a tax of one penney per acre to be used for the improvement of roads within the town.

A member of the board of selectmen, Hall served as a member of the New Hampshire House of Representatives. He was appointed judge of the court of common pleas by Governor John Taylor Gilman in 1805, solicitor and Sheriff in 1812.

Elected as a Democratic-Republican to the Twelfth Congress, Hall served as United States Representative for the state of New Hampshire from (March 4, 1811 – March 3, 1813). He was a member of the New Hampshire Senate in 1819.

== Death ==
Hall died in Bartlett, Carroll County, New Hampshire, on April 1, 1828 (age 70 years, 100 days). Originally, he was interred at Garland Ridge Cemetery, Near Bartlett, Carroll County, New Hampshire. He was reinterred at Evergreen Cemetery, Portland, Maine.

== Family life ==
Son of Jonathan and Lydia Leonard Hall, he married Abigail Dean on May 6, 1784. After her death on November 10, 1804, he married Eliza Fox on June 11, 1805. After Hall's death, Eliza married Richard Odell in November 1832 and moved to Portland, Maine.

U.S. House of Representatives
Preceded by William Hale	Member of the U.S. House of Representatives from New Hampshire; 1811-1813	Succeeded by William Hale
