= Josiah Butler =

American politician (1779–1854)

Member of the U.S. House of Representatives from New Hampshire's At-Large district
- In office March 4, 1817 – March 3, 1823
- Preceded by: Charles H. Atherton
- Succeeded by: George Cassedy

Member of the New Hampshire House of Representatives
- In office 1814–1816

Personal details
- Born: December 4, 1779 Pelham, Hillsborough County; New Hampshire, US
- Died: October 27, 1854 (aged 74) Deerfield, Rockingham County; New Hampshire, US
- Resting place: Farmington Cemetery; Farmington, New Hampshire
- Party: Democratic-Republican
- Spouse: Hannah Jenness Butler
- Children: DeWitt Clinton Butler; Horace Butler; Josiah W Butler; Elizabeth H Butler; Lydia J Butler; Franklin I Butler; Franklin Jenness Butler; Wentworth S Butler; Caroline L Butler; Mary J Butler
- Parent(s): Nehemiah Butler; Lyndia Wood Butler
- Education: Harvard University
- Profession: Lawyer; Judge; Politician

Josiah Butler (December 4, 1779 – October 27, 1854) was an American politician and a United States representative from New Hampshire.

== Early life ==
Born in Pelham, New Hampshire, Butler attended the Londonderry and Atkinson academies and was instructed by private tutors. He graduated from Harvard University in 1803 and taught school in Virginia for three years. He then studied law with Clifton Claggett of Amherst and Governor Cabot of Virginia and was admitted to the bar of Virginia in 1807.

== Career ==
Upon his return to Pelham, Butler commenced practice in 1807, then moved to Deerfield, Rockingham County, New Hampshire, in 1809. He served as the sheriff of Rockingham County from 1810 to 1813 and then served as the clerk of the court of common pleas. An unsuccessful candidate for election in 1812 to the Thirteenth Congress, he was a member of the New Hampshire House of Representatives from 1814 to 1816.

Elected as a Democratic-Republican to the Fifteenth Congress and reelected to the Sixteenth and Seventeenth Congresses, Butler served as United States Representative for the state of New Hampshire from March 4, 1817, to March 3, 1823. In Congress, he served as chairman of the Committee on Agriculture (Seventeenth Congress). After leaving congressional service, he served as an associate justice of the New Hampshire Court of Common Pleas from 1825 to 1835.

== Death ==
Butler died in Deerfield on October 27, 1854 (age 74 years, 327 days). He is interred in Granite Cemetery, South Deerfield, Rockingham County, New Hampshire, United States.

== Family life ==
Son of Nehemiah and Lyndia Wood, Butler married Hannah Jenness and they had ten children: DeWitt Clinton, Horace, Josiah W., Elizabeth H., Lydia J., Franklin I., Franklin Jenness, Wentworth S., Caroline L., and Mary J.

U.S. House of Representatives
Preceded by Charles H. Atherton	Member of the U.S. House of Representatives from New Hampshire; 1817–1823	Succeeded by George Cassedy
