= 1818 New Hampshire gubernatorial election =

- March 10, 1818
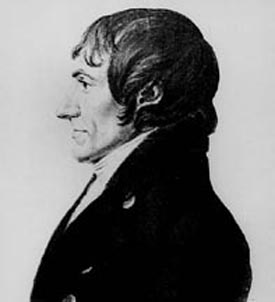

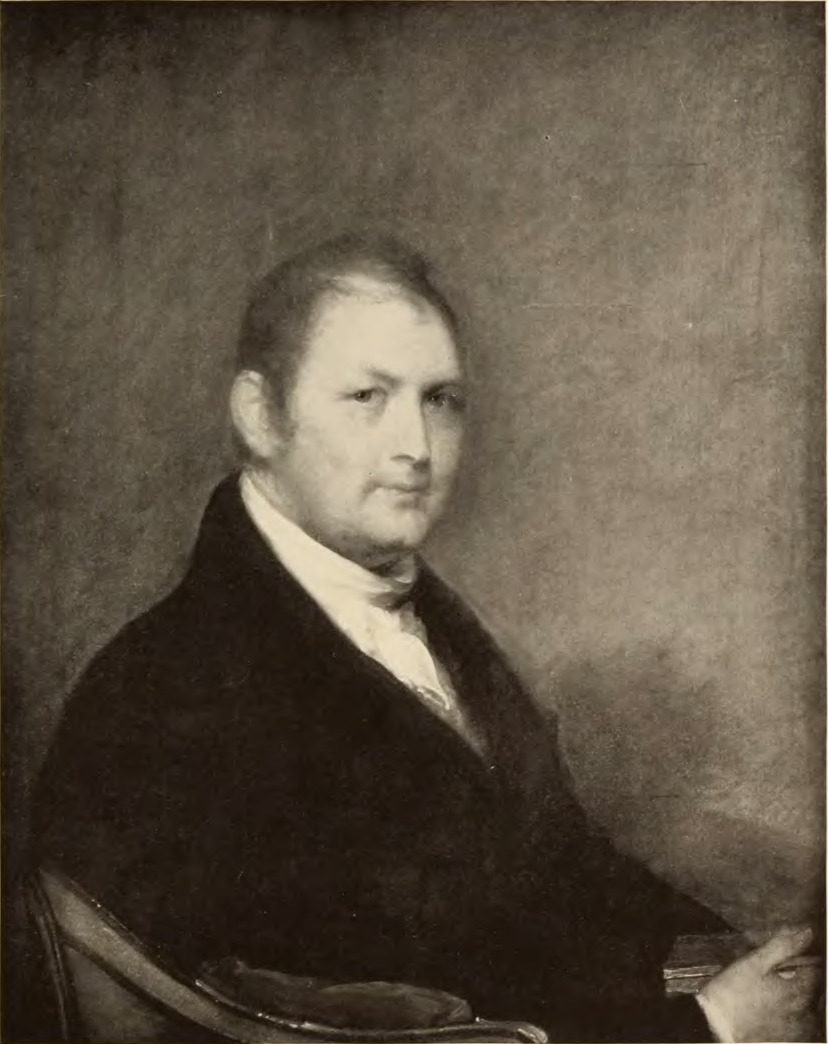

Nominee	William Plumer	Jeremiah Mason	William Hale
Party	Democratic-Republican	Federalist	Federalist
Popular vote	18,674	6,850	5,019
Percentage	59.35%	21.77%	15.95%
- County results Plumer: 40–50% 60–70% 70–80%
Governor before election
William Plumer
Democratic-Republican
Elected Governor
William Plumer
Democratic-Republican

The 1818 New Hampshire gubernatorial election was held on March 10, 1818.

Incumbent Democratic-Republican Governor William Plumer defeated Federalist nominees Jeremiah Mason and William Hale.

== General election ==
=== Candidates ===
- William Hale, Federalist, former U.S. representative
- Jeremiah Mason, Federalist, former U.S. senator
- William Plumer, Democratic-Republican, incumbent governor

=== Results ===
1818 New Hampshire gubernatorial election (Note: Some sources give slightly different results. The result given is taken from the New Hampshire Senate Journal.)
Party	Candidate	Votes	%	±%
Democratic-Republican	William Plumer (incumbent)	18,674	59.35%	
Federalist	Jeremiah Mason	6,850	21.77%	
Federalist	William Hale	5,019	15.95%	
Scattering		922	2.93%	
Majority		11,824	37.58%	
Turnout		31,465		
Democratic-Republican hold		Swing		
