= George B. Upham =

American politician

George Baxter Upham

Member of the U.S. House of Representatives from New Hampshire's At large district
- In office March 4, 1801 – March 3, 1803
- Preceded by: James Sheafe
- Succeeded by: Silas Betton

Speaker of the New Hampshire House of Representatives
- In office 1815–1816
- Preceded by: Thomas W. Thompson
- Succeeded by: David L. Morrill

Speaker of the New Hampshire House of Representatives
- In office 1809–1810
- Preceded by: Charles Cutts
- Succeeded by: Charles Cutts

Member of the New Hampshire House of Representatives
- In office 1815–1816

Member of the New Hampshire State Senate
- In office 1814–1814

Member of the New Hampshire House of Representatives
- In office 1804–1813

Personal details
- Born: December 27, 1768 Brookfield, Province of Massachusetts Bay, British America
- Died: February 10, 1848 (aged 79) Claremont, New Hampshire, U.S.
- Resting place: Pleasant Street Cemetery
- Party: Federalist
- Spouse: Mary D Upham
- Relations: Jabez Upham
- Children: George Baxter Upham; Robert Harris Upham; Jabez Baxter Upham; Harriet Harris Upham; James Phineas Upham; Edward B Upham
- Education: Phillips Exeter Academy; Harvard University, 1789
- Profession: Lawyer; Banker politician

George Baxter Upham (December 27, 1768 – February 10, 1848) was an American politician and a United States Representative from the U. S. state of New Hampshire.

== Early life ==
Born in Brookfield in the Province of Massachusetts Bay, Upham attended the common schools and Phillips Exeter Academy in Exeter, New Hampshire. He graduated from Harvard University in 1789, studied law and was admitted to the bar in 1792.

== Career ==
Upham practiced law in Claremont, New Hampshire, and served as solicitor for Cheshire County from December 15, 1796, to 1804.

Elected as a Federalist to the Seventh United States Congress and served as United States Representative for the state of New Hampshire from March 4, 1801, to March 3, 1803. He declined to be a candidate for reelection in 1802.

Upham was a member of the New Hampshire House of Representatives from 1804 to 1813 and again in 1815. He served as Speaker of the House in 1809 and 1815. He served in the State Senate in 1814. He resumed the practice of law and was president of Claremont Bank for twenty years after retiring from public life.

He was elected a member of the American Antiquarian Society in 1815.

== Death ==
Upham died in Claremont, Sullivan County, New Hampshire, on February 10, 1848 (age 79 years, 45 days). He is interred at Pleasant Street Cemetery, Claremont, New Hampshire.

== Family life ==
Upham was the son of Phineas and Susanna Buckminster Upham, brother of Jabez Upham, and cousin of Charles Wentworth Upham. He married Mary Duncan on December 31, 1805, and they had six children: George Baxter, Robert Harris, Jabez Baxter, Harriet Harris, James Phineas, and Edward B.

Political offices
Preceded by Charles Cutts	Speaker of the New Hampshire House of Representatives; 1809-1810	Succeeded by Charles Cutts
Preceded by Thomas W. Thompson	Speaker of the New Hampshire House of Representatives; 1815-1816	Succeeded by David L. Morrill
U.S. House of Representatives
Preceded by James Sheafe	Member of the U.S. House of Representatives from New Hampshire; March 4, 1801 – March 3, 1803	Succeeded by Silas Betton
