= William Hale (New Hampshire politician) =

American politician (1765–1848)

Member of the U.S. House of Representatives from New Hampshire's at-large district
- In office March 4, 1809 – March 3, 1811
- Preceded by: Francis Gardner
- Succeeded by: Obed Hall
- In office March 4, 1813 – March 3, 1817
- Preceded by: Obed Hall
- Succeeded by: Clifton Clagett

Member of the New Hampshire Senate
- In office 1796–1800

Personal details
- Born: August 6, 1765 Portsmouth, Province of New Hampshire, British America
- Died: November 8, 1848 (aged 83) Dover, New Hampshire, U.S.
- Resting place: Pine Hill Cemetery
- Party: Federalist
- Spouse: Lydia Rollins
- Profession: Merchant; Shipowner; Politician

William Hale (August 6, 1765 – November 8, 1848) was an American merchant, shipowner and politician. He served as a U.S. representative from New Hampshire during the early 1800s.

== Early life and career ==
Hale was born in Portsmouth in the Province of New Hampshire, the son of Samuel Hale and Mary Wright Hale. He attended the public schools. He moved to Dover, New Hampshire around 1765 to work with his older brother Samuel as a merchant, shipowner and shipbuilder.

He served in the New Hampshire Senate from 1796 to 1800, and as member of the Governor's Council from 1803 to 1805. Hale was elected as a Federalist to the Eleventh Congress serving from March 4, 1809 – March 3, 1811. He was reelected to serve in the Thirteenth Congress and Fourteenth Congress, and served from March 4, 1813 – March 3, 1817.

Hale died in Dover on November 8, 1848, and is interred in Pine Hill Cemetery.

== Personal life ==
Hale married Lydia Rollins on April 30, 1794. Their children included: Thomas Wright (1795–1855); John (1796–1798); Mary Ann (1798–1882); Elizabeth (1800–1882); Lydia Rollins (1803–1877); William (1804–1893); Andrew Rollins (1806–1876); Samuel (1808–1810); Charles (1810–1819); and Richard Rollins (1812–1815). Elizabeth Hale was the second wife of Jeremiah Smith.

== William Hale House ==
In December 1980, Hale's home in Dover was added to the National Register of Historic Places. The house was built in 1806 and built in the Federalist style. Hale hosted both President James Monroe and General Lafayette in his home.

Party political offices
Preceded by Jeremiah Mason	Federalist nominee for Governor of New Hampshire; 1819, 1820	Succeeded by None
U.S. House of Representatives
Preceded by Francis Gardner	Member of the U.S. House of Representatives from New Hampshire; 1809-1811	Succeeded by Obed Hall
Preceded by Obed Hall	Member of the U.S. House of Representatives from New Hampshire; 1813-1817	Succeeded by Clifton Clagett
