= Jeremiah Mason =

American politician (1768–1848)

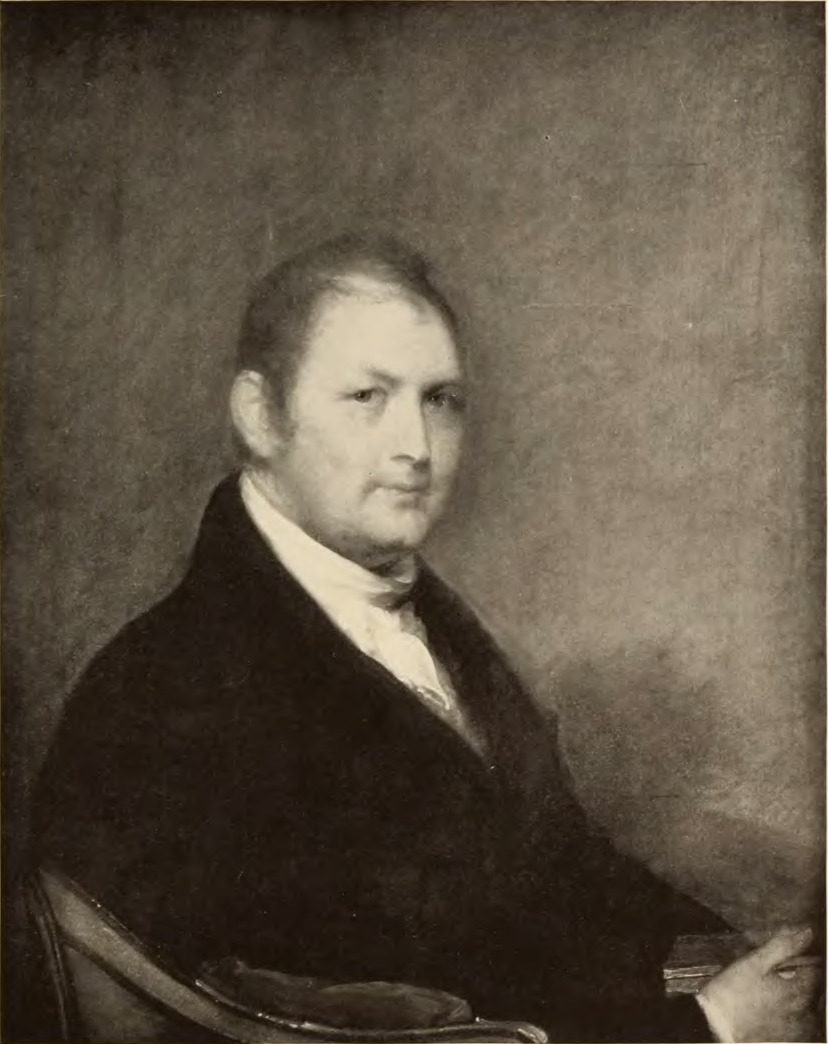
- portrait by Gilbert Stuart

United States Senator from New Hampshire
- In office June 10, 1813 – June 16, 1817
- Preceded by: Charles Cutts
- Succeeded by: Clement Storer

Attorney General of New Hampshire
- In office 1802–1805

Personal details
- Born: April 27, 1768 Lebanon, Connecticut
- Died: October 14, 1848 (aged 80) Boston, Massachusetts
- Party: Federalist
- Spouse: Mary Means (m. 1799)
- Relations: Ellen Francis Mason (granddaughter)
- Children: Robert Means Mason
- Education: Yale College

Jeremiah Mason (April 27, 1768 – October 14, 1848) was a United States senator from New Hampshire.

== Early life ==
Mason was born in Lebanon, Connecticut on April 27, 1768. He was a son of Jeremiah Mason (1729/30–1813) and the former Elizabeth Fitch (1731–1809).

He graduated from Yale College in 1788, studied law, moved to Vermont, and was admitted to the bar in 1791.

== Career ==
After several years in Vermont, he moved to New Hampshire where he continued to practice law. From 1802 to 1805, he served as the attorney general of New Hampshire.

Mason was elected as a Federalist to the U.S. Senate to fill the vacancy in the term beginning March 4, 1813, and served from June 10, 1813, until June 16, 1817, when he resigned. He was elected a member of the American Antiquarian Society in 1815. He was a member of the New Hampshire House of Representatives in 1820-1821 and 1824, and was president of the Portsmouth branch of the United States Bank in 1828–1829. Mason exchanged letters with Nicholas Biddle, the president of the Bank of the United States.

He moved to Boston in 1832 and retired from the practice of law in 1838, but continued as chamber counsel up to the time of his death in 1848.

== Personal life ==
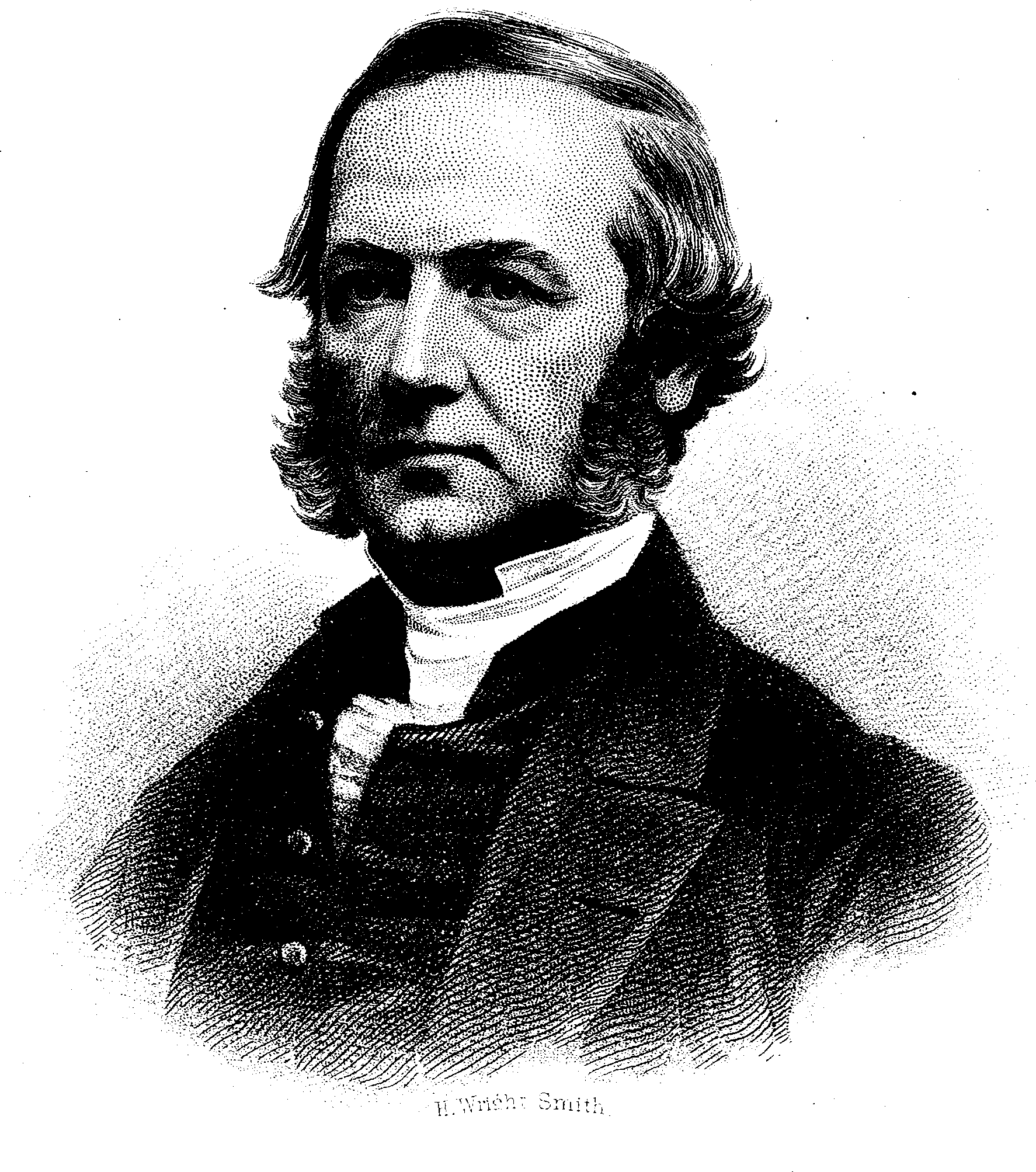
Mason's son, the Rev. Dr. Charles Mason

On November 6, 1799, Mason was married to Mary Means (1777–1858), daughter of Robert Means and Mary (née McGregor) Means. Mary was a sister of Elizabeth Means, wife of Congregationalist minister Jesse Appleton, parents of Jane Means Appleton (wife of the 14th U.S. President Franklin Pierce). They were the parents of eight children, including:

- George Means Mason (1800–1865)
- Robert Means Mason (1810–1879), who married Sarah Ellen Francis (1819–1865), daughter of Ebenezer Francis and Elizabeth (née Thorndike) Francis, in 1843.
- Charles Mason (1812–1862), the Rector of Grace Church in Boston who married Susannah Lawrence (1817–1844), a daughter of the wealthy merchant Amos Lawrence. After her death, he married Anna Huntington Lyman (1821–1883) in 1849. Anna's sister was married to agricultural writer Richard L. Allen.

Mason died in Boston on October 14, 1848. He was interred in Mount Auburn Cemetery, Cambridge, Massachusetts.

=== Descendants ===
Through his son Robert, he was a grandfather of Elizabeth Mason (1844–1924), who married Robert Charles Winthrop Jr. (son of U.S. Senator and former Speaker of the House of Representatives Robert Charles Winthrop) on June 1, 1869 (ancestors of U.S. Secretary of State John Kerry). He was also the grandfather of Ellen Francis Mason, Alfred Mason, Anna Frances Mason, Clara Thorndike Mason, and Ida Means Mason.

Party political offices
Preceded by James Sheafe	Federalist nominee for Governor of New Hampshire; 1818	Succeeded by William Hale
U.S. Senate
Preceded by Charles Cutts	U.S. senator (Class 3) from New Hampshire; 1813–1817; Served alongside: Nicholas Gilman, Thomas W. Thompson, David L. Morril	Succeeded by Clement Storer
