= David L. Morril =

American politician (1772–1849)

David Lawrence Morril
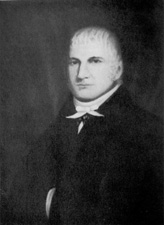

United States Senator from New Hampshire
- In office March 4, 1817 – March 3, 1823
- Preceded by: Thomas W. Thompson
- Succeeded by: Samuel Bell

10th Governor of New Hampshire
- In office June 3, 1824 – June 7, 1827
- Preceded by: Levi Woodbury
- Succeeded by: Benjamin Pierce

Speaker of the New Hampshire House of Representatives
- Preceded by: George B. Upham
- Succeeded by: Henry B. Chase

Member of the New Hampshire House of Representatives
- In office 1808–1816

Personal details
- Born: June 10, 1772 Epping, Province of New Hampshire, British America
- Died: January 28, 1849 (aged 76) Concord, New Hampshire, U.S.
- Party: Democratic-Republican
- Spouse(s): Jane Wallace, Lydia Poore
- Children: Four
- Education: Dartmouth College; University of Vermont (J.D.)

David Lawrence Morril (June 10, 1772 – January 28, 1849) was an American politician, attorney, medical doctor and minister. He served as a U.S. senator for New Hampshire from 1817 to 1823, and was the tenth governor of New Hampshire, serving from 1824 until 1827.

== Early life ==
Morril was born to Samuel and Anna (Lawrence) Morril in Epping in the Province of New Hampshire on June 10, 1772. He graduated from Phillips Exeter Academy and Dartmouth College, and later received his law degree from the University of Vermont.

He worked as a clergyman, called to the Congregational Presbyterian Church in 1802 in Goffstown, New Hampshire, where he served for years.

== Political career ==
In 1808, Morril was elected as a member of the New Hampshire House of Representatives; he served until 1816. In his last term in 1816, he was elected by the House as Speaker.

The legislature elected him as the U.S. Senator from New Hampshire in 1817, and he served until 1823.

In 1824 Morril was elected as Governor of New Hampshire, serving from June 3, 1824, to June 7, 1827. In the 1824 election, Morril received the most votes; however, because he failed to win a majority of the votes cast, the election had to be decided by the legislature. Morril was elected by a vote of 163 to 43 during a joint meeting of the New Hampshire legislature. In the 1825 election, Morril ran unopposed; in the 1826 election, Morril defeated his opponent Benjamin Pierce by 5,392 votes. In the 1827 election, Morril was defeated by Pierce by an overwhelming margin: Benjamin Pierce won 21,166 votes out of 27,411 cast.

== Personal life ==
Morril was married twice to Jane Wallace & Lydia Poore, whom he had four children with. He is buried in the Old North Cemetery, Concord, New Hampshire, near the grave of President Franklin Pierce.

== Notes ==
Party political offices
| First | National Republican nominee for Governor of New Hampshire; 1824, 1825, 1826, 1827 | Succeeded by John Bell |
U.S. Senate
| Preceded by Thomas W. Thompson | U.S. senator (Class 2) from New Hampshire; 1817–1823; Served alongside: Jeremiah Mason, Clement Storer, John F. Parrott | Succeeded by Samuel Bell |
Political offices
| Preceded by Levi Woodbury | Governor of New Hampshire; 1824–1827 | Succeeded by Benjamin Pierce |
| Preceded by George B. Upham | Speaker of the New Hampshire House of Representatives; 1816–1816 | Succeeded by Henry B. Chase |
