= Thomas Smith (Pennsylvania congressman) =

American politician (1773–1846)

Thomas Smith (October 7, 1773 – January 27, 1846) was a Federalist member of the United States House of Representatives who served Pennsylvania's 1st congressional district from 1815 to 1817.

A native of Pennsylvania, Smith was born in Tinicum Township in the state's Delaware County where, in 1806, he was elected to the Pennsylvania House of Representatives, serving through 1807. A Federalist Party candidate in the Election of 1814, he won the first district seat to represent Pennsylvania in the Fourteenth United States Congress from March 4, 1815, to March 3, 1817.

In 1815, the first year of his one-term Congressional service, Smith moved to Darby Township (later Darby Borough). Three decades later, at the time of his death, he was still in public service, as a justice of the peace in Darby, where he died at the age of 72 on January 27, 1846. The interment was in St. James's (Old Swedes) Cemetery in Paschall in present-day Philadelphia.

Among his descendants was Aubrey Henry Smith (1814–1891), a lawyer, U.S. district attorney, and early officer of the Philadelphia, Wilmington and Baltimore Railroad.

== Sources ==
- Congressional Biography
- The Political Graveyard

U.S. House of Representatives
Preceded by Adam Seybert; John Conard; William Anderson; Charles J. Ingersoll	Member of the U.S. House of Representatives from Pennsylvania's 1st congressional district 1815–1817 alongside: Jonathan Williams, William Milnor, Joseph Hopkinson, John Sergeant	Succeeded by Joseph Hopkinson; John Sergeant; Adam Seybert; William Anderson
