= William Anderson (Pennsylvania politician) =

American politician (1762-1829)

Member of the U.S. House of Representatives from Pennsylvania's 1st district
- In office March 4, 1809 – March 4, 1815
- In office March 4, 1817 – March 4, 1819

Personal details
- Born: 1762 Virginia Colony, British America
- Died: December 15 or 16, 1829 Chester, Pennsylvania, U.S.
- Resting place: Old St. Paul's Church Cemetery, Chester, Pennsylvania, U.S.
- Party: Democratic-Republican

William Anderson (1762 – December 15 or 16, 1829) was an American politician who served as a Democratic-Republican member of the U.S. House of Representatives for Pennsylvania's 1st congressional district from 1809 to 1815 and from 1817 to 1819. He served as a major in the Continental Army during the American Revolutionary War.

== Early life and military service ==
Anderson was born in Virginia in 1762. During the American Revolutionary War, he joined the Continental Army at the age of fifteen and served until the end of the war. He was a major on the staff of General Lafayette and distinguished himself at the Battle of Germantown and the Siege of Yorktown.

== Career ==
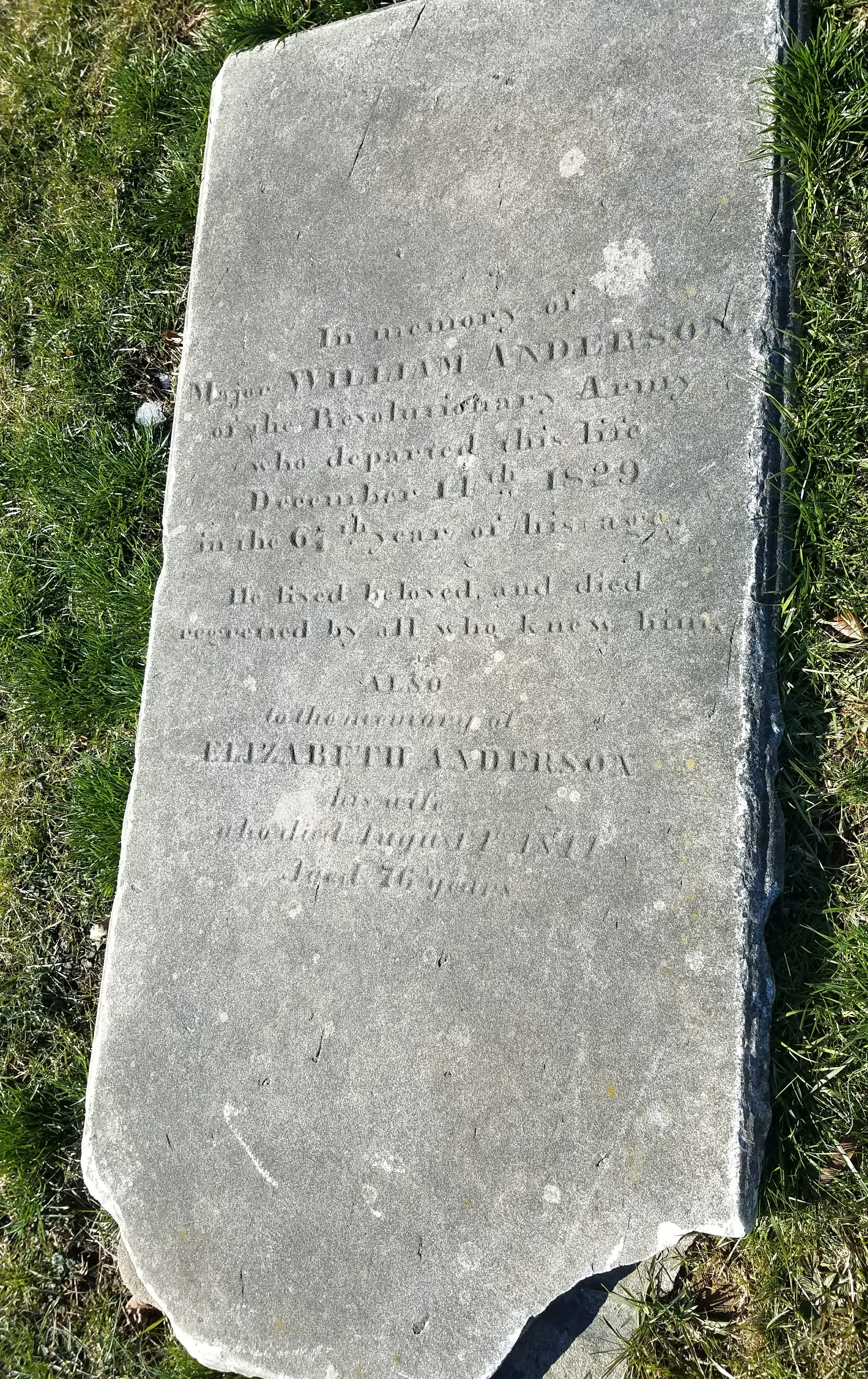
Major William Anderson gravestone in Old St. Paul's Episcopal Church burial ground in Chester, Pennsylvania

In 1796, Anderson entered the hotel business through the purchase of the Columbia House in Chester, Pennsylvania. He served as postmaster in Chester from 1797 to 1798, Delaware County auditor in 1804, and county director of the poor in 1805. He was elected as a Democratic-Republican to the Eleventh, Twelfth, Thirteenth, and Fifteenth Congresses.

In 1824, he served as chairman of the Delaware County committee to receive General Lafayette during his visit to the United States and hosted Lafayette at his home in Chester.

He was appointed as an associate judge of the Courts of Delaware County on January 5, 1826, and resigned in 1828 to become an inspector of customs in Philadelphia.

He died either December 15, or December 16, 1829, in Chester, Pennsylvania, and was interred in Old St. Paul's Church Cemetery.

== Slaveholding ==
Anderson owned enslaved persons. In 1780, the Pennsylvania General Assembly passed An Act for the Gradual Aboliton of Slavery. It required the registration of all slaves by November 1, 1780. All persons born after that date were free except for the children of registered slaves who would be servants of their parents owners until they reached 28 years of age. A further act of the Assembly in 1798, required the registration of all children born of slaves within six months of their birth. On July 2, 1806, Anderson registered a "male mulatto bastard child" named Francis.

== Personal life ==
He was married to Elizabeth Dixon and together they had three children. Their daughter Evelina married Commodore David Porter.

U.S. House of Representatives
Preceded by Benjamin Say; Jacob Richards; John Porter	Member of the U.S. House of Representatives from Pennsylvania's 1st congressional district 1809–1815 1809–1815 alongside: Adam Seybert; 1809–1811 alongside: John Porter; 1811–1813 alongside: James Milnor; 1813–1815 alongside: John Conard and Charles J. Ingersoll	Succeeded by Joseph Hopkinson; William Milnor; Thomas Smith; Jonathan Williams
Preceded by Joseph Hopkinson; William Milnor; Thomas Smith; John Sergeant	Member of the U.S. House of Representatives from Pennsylvania's 1st congressional district 1817–1819 alongside: Joseph Hopkinson, Adam Seybert and John Sergeant	Succeeded by John Sergeant; Thomas Forrest; Samuel Edwards; Joseph Hemphill
