= 1815 Pennsylvania's 1st congressional district special election =

On May 16, 1815, Representative-Elect Jonathan Williams (DR) who'd been elected for Pennsylvania's 1st district, died before the start of the 14th Congress. A special election was held on October 10 of that year to fill the vacancy left by his death.

== Election results ==
Candidate	Party	Votes	Percent
John Sergeant	Federalist	6,364	60.2%
John Conard	Democratic-Republican	4,204	39.8%

Williams had been the sole Democratic-Republican elected to Pennsylvania's 1st district (a plural district with 4 seats), and so with Sergeant's win, all four of the 1st district's seats were held by Federalists. Sergeant took his seat in the Congress on December 6, 1815

== See also ==
- List of special elections to the United States House of Representatives
