= William Milnor =

American politician

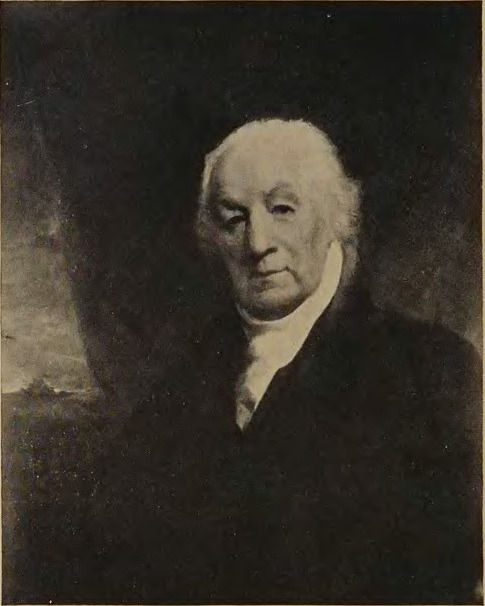
- portrait by John Neagle
- Born: June 26, 1769; Philadelphia
- Died: December 13, 1848; Burlington
- Resting place: Saint Mary's Episcopal Churchyard
- Occupation: Politician

William Milnor, Jr. (June 26, 1769 – December 13, 1848) was a member of the United States House of Representatives from Pennsylvania and Mayor of Philadelphia.

William Milnor was born in Philadelphia, Pennsylvania, the son of William Milnor Sr and Anna Breintnall. He engaged in mercantile pursuits in Philadelphia, and was elected as a Federalist to the Tenth and Eleventh Congresses. He served as chairman of the United States House Committee on Accounts during the Eleventh Congress. He was elected to the Fourteenth Congress, and again elected to the Seventeenth Congress and served until his resignation on May 8, 1822.

Milnor elected mayor of Philadelphia on October 20, 1829, and served one year. He died in Burlington, New Jersey, and was buried in that city's Saint Mary's Episcopal Churchyard.

Milnor was a slaveowner.

== Family ==
William Milnor was the brother of James Milnor, a lawyer, former member of the U.S. House of Representatives, and rector of St. George’s Chapel in Manhattan, New York.

U.S. House of Representatives
| Preceded by Robert Brown; John Pugh; Frederick Conrad | Member of the U.S. House of Representatives from Pennsylvania's 2nd congressional district 1807–1811 1807–1811 alongside: Robert Brown; 1807–1809 alongside: John Pugh; 1809–1811 alongside: John Ross | Succeeded by Robert Brown; Jonathan Roberts; William Rodman |
| Preceded by Adam Seybert; William Anderson; John Conard; Charles J. Ingersoll | Member of the U.S. House of Representatives from Pennsylvania's 1st congressional district 1815–1817 1815–1817 alongside: Joseph Hopkinson, John Sergeant and Thomas Smith; 1815 alongside: Jonathan Williams | Succeeded by William Anderson; Adam Seybert; John Sergeant; Joseph Hopkinson |
| Preceded by Joseph Hemphill, John Sergeant; Thomas Forrest; Samuel Edwards | Member of the U.S. House of Representatives from Pennsylvania's 1st congressional district 1821–1822 alongside: Joseph Hemphill, John Sergeant and Samuel Edwards | Succeeded by Joseph Hemphill, John Sergeant; Thomas Forrest; Samuel Edwards |
Political offices
| Preceded by Benjamin Wood Richards | Mayor of Philadelphia; 1829 | Succeeded by Benjamin Wood Richards |
