= Adam Seybert =

American politician and mineralogist (1773–1825)

Member of the U.S. House of Representatives for Pennsylvania's 1st district
- In office October 10, 1809 – March 4, 1815
- Preceded by: Benjamin Say
- Succeeded by: William Milnor
- In office March 4, 1817 – March 4, 1819
- Preceded by: William Milnor
- Succeeded by: Thomas Forrest

Personal details
- Born: May 16, 1773 Philadelphia, Pennsylvania, U.S.
- Died: May 2, 1825 (aged 51) Paris, France
- Resting place: Laurel Hill Cemetery, Philadelphia, Pennsylvania, U.S.
- Party: Democratic-Republican

Adam Seybert (May 16, 1773 – May 2, 1825) was an American politician who served as a Democratic-Republican member of the U.S. House of Representatives for Pennsylvania's 1st congressional district from 1809 to 1815 and 1817 to 1819. He was a faculty member at the University of Pennsylvania and a mineralogist who organized the first mineralogy collection in the United States in the 1790s.

== Early life and education ==
Seybert was born on May 16, 1773, in Philadelphia, Pennsylvania. He graduated in 1793 with a degree in medicine from the University of Pennsylvania. He continued his studies in Europe, and attended schools in Edinburgh, Göttingen, and Paris. He studied mineralogy at the Ecole des Mines and was the first American to study mineralogy in Germany. He returned to Philadelphia with a collection of minerals and worked as a physician for a short time before establishing himself as a "druggist, chemist and apothecary". He was a faculty member at the University of Pennsylvania. He was elected as a member of the American Philosophical Society in 1797, and a Fellow of the American Academy of Arts and Sciences in 1824.

== Political career ==
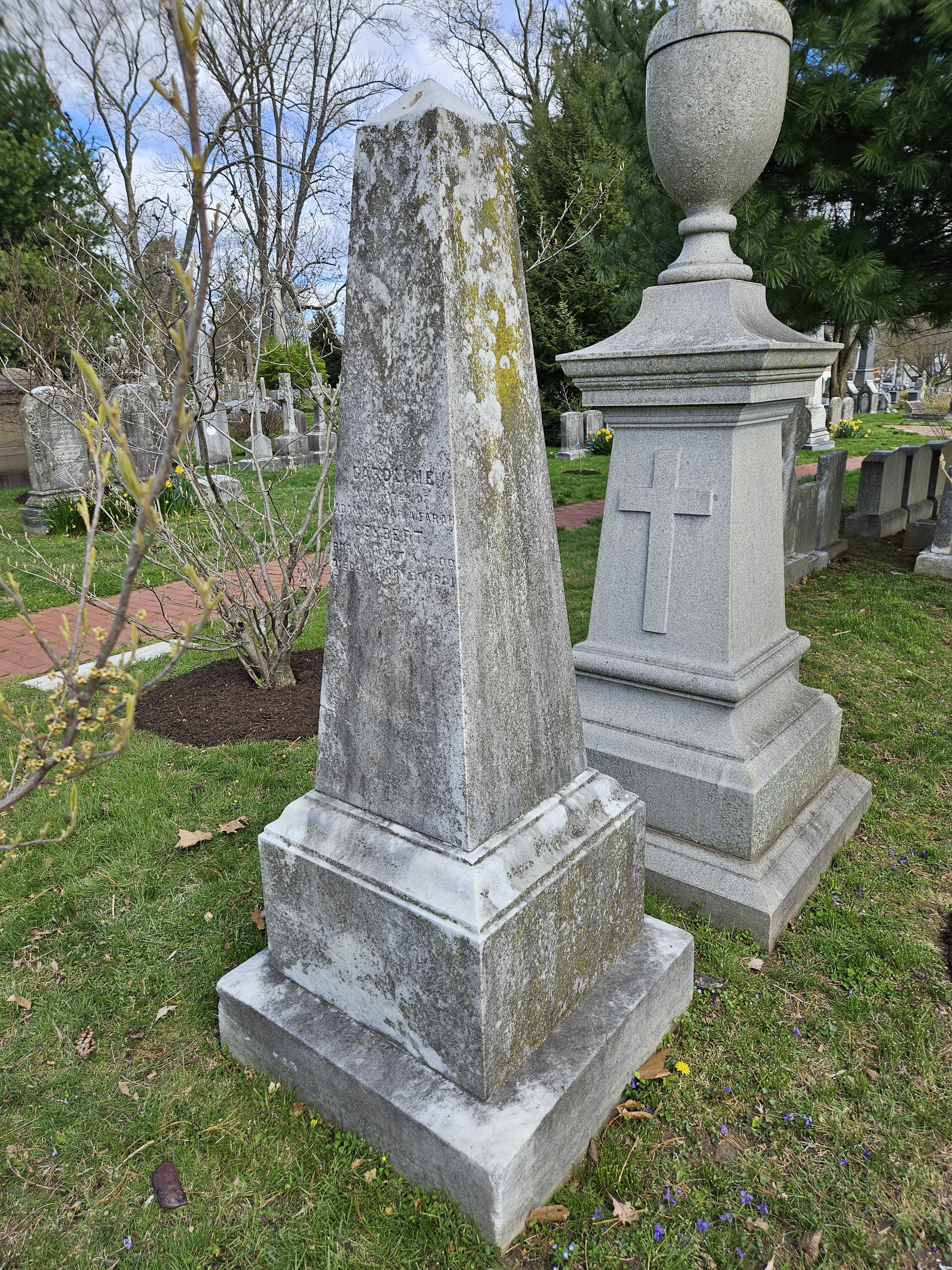
Adam Seybert tombstone in Laurel Hill Cemetery

In 1809, Seybert was elected to the 11th United States Congress as a Democratic-Republican representative for Pennsylvania's 1st congressional district to fill the vacancy caused by the resignation of Benjamin Say. In the fall of 1811, he reassured President James Madison that his state had military gear and production to meet war needs. He was reelected to the Twelfth and Thirteenth Congresses. He was chairman of the United States House Committee on Revisal and Unfinished Business during the Twelfth Congress. He was again elected to the Fifteenth Congress and served from 1817 to 1819. He visited Europe from 1819 to 1821 and again in 1824 and settled in Paris, France, where he died May 2, 1825. He was originally interred at Père Lachaise Cemetery in Paris and re-interred to Laurel Hill Cemetery in Philadelphia.

== Mineralogy ==
Seybert established the first mineralogy collection in the United States in the 1790s. The collection contained over 1,725 crystals and rocks. The noted mineralogist, Benjamin Silliman, was known to have traveled to Philadelphia to view the collection, and have Seybert analyze minerals from Silliman's collection. In 1812, Seybert sold his mineralogy collection to the Academy of Natural Sciences in Philadelphia. His political career took priority over his interest in mineralogy, and when Parker Cleaveland wrote to him in December of 1813 with questions on mineralogy, he replied that he had lost interest in the science.

== Legacy ==
After Seyberts' death, his mineralogy collection was put on display at the Free Natural History Museum of the Academy of Natural Sciences in Philadelphia.

The University of Pennsylvania philosophy department named a chair in the department the Adam Seybert Professor in Moral and Intellectual Philosophy. The chair was funded by Adam's son, Henry Seybert. The duties of the chair included hosting the Adam Seybert committee which investigated the possibility of the spirit world. The committee met from 1883 to 1887 but was unable to discover any evidence and subsequent holders of the chair were freed from continuing the investigations.

== Publications ==
- Experiments and Observations on Land and Sea Air, Transactions of the American Philosophical Society, 1799
- An Inaugural Dissertation: Being an Attempt to Disprove the Doctrine of the Putrefaction of the Blood of Living Animals., Philadelphia: T. Dobson, 1793
- Statistical Annals: Embracing Views of the Population, Commerce, Navigation, Fisheries, Public Lands, Post-Office Establishment, Revenues, Mint, Military and Naval Establishments, Expenditures, Public Debt and Sinking Fund of the United States of America, Philadelphia: Thomas Dobson & Son, 1818

U.S. House of Representatives
Preceded by Benjamin Say; Jacob Richards; John Porter	Member of the U.S. House of Representatives from Pennsylvania's 1st congressional district 1809–1815 1809–1815 alongside: William Anderson; 1809–1811 alongside: John Porter; 1811–1813 alongside: James Milnor; 1813–1815 alongside: John Conard and Charles J. Ingersoll	Succeeded by Joseph Hopkinson; William Milnor; Thomas Smith; Jonathan Williams
Preceded by Joseph Hopkinson; William Milnor; Thomas Smith; John Sergeant	Member of the U.S. House of Representatives from Pennsylvania's 1st congressional district 1817–1819 alongside: Joseph Hopkinson, William Anderson and John Sergeant	Succeeded by John Sergeant; Thomas Forrest; Samuel Edwards; Joseph Hemphill
