= Joseph Hemphill =

American politician (1770–1842)

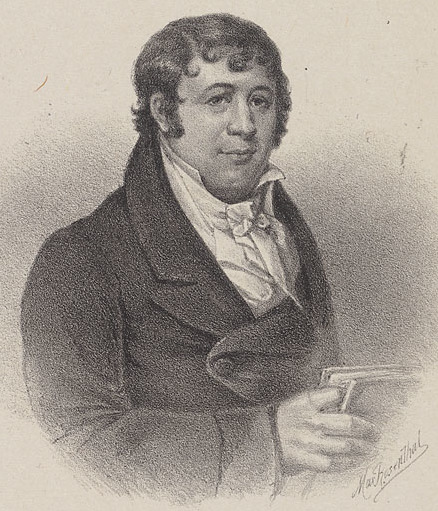
- Etching of Joseph Hemphill by Max Rosenthal

Member of the U.S. House of Representatives from Pennsylvania
- In office March 4, 1801 – March 3, 1803
- Preceded by: Richard Thomas
- Succeeded by: Isaac Anderson, Joseph Hiester, and John Whitehill
- Constituency: 3rd district
- In office March 4, 1819 – 1826
- Preceded by: William Anderson, Joseph Hopkinson, John Sergeant, and Adam Seybert
- Succeeded by: Thomas Kittera
- Constituency: 1st district (1819–1823); 2nd district (1823–1826)
- In office March 4, 1829 – March 3, 1831
- Preceded by: Joel Barlow Sutherland
- Succeeded by: John G. Watmough
- Constituency: 3rd district

Member of the Pennsylvania House of Representatives
- In office 1797-1800; 1805; 1831-1832

Personal details
- Born: January 7, 1770 Thornbury Township, Province of Pennsylvania, British America
- Died: May 29, 1842 (aged 72) Philadelphia, Pennsylvania, U.S.
- Resting place: Laurel Hill Cemetery, Philadelphia, Pennsylvania, U.S.
- Party: Federalist; Jacksonian Federalist; Jacksonian
- Spouse: Margaret Coleman (m. 1806)
- Relatives: Alexander Hemphill

Joseph Hemphill (January 7, 1770 – May 29, 1842) was an American politician who served as a Federalist member of the U.S. House of Representatives for Pennsylvania's 3rd congressional district from 1801 to 1803, as a Jackson Federalist representative for Pennsylvania's 1st congressional district from 1819 to 1823 and as a Jacksonian representative for Pennsylvania's 2nd congressional district from 1829 to 1831.

He also served as a member of the Pennsylvania House of Representatives from 1797 to 1800, in 1805 and from 1831 to 1832.

== Early life and education ==
Hemphill was born on January 7, 1770, to Joseph and Ann (Wills) Hemphill in Thornbury Township in the Province of Pennsylvania. He graduated from the University of Pennsylvania at Philadelphia in 1791. He studied law under Thomas Ross, was admitted to the bar in 1793 and began to practice law in West Chester, Pennsylvania.

== Political career ==
“Against the aborigines who once possessed this fair country, what complaint have we to make? In what degree are their scalping knives and tomahawks to be compared with our instruments of death by which we have overthrown their once powerful kingdoms, and reduced the whole fabric of their societies, with their kings and queens, to their present miserable condition? How little did they expect, three hundred years ago, that a race of human beings would come from beyond the great waters to destroy them.”—Congressman Joseph Hemphill, 1832 House debates on the Indian Removal Act.

Hemphill served as a member of the Pennsylvania House of Representatives from 1797 to 1800. He was elected as a Federalist member representing Pennsylvania's 3rd congressional district in the Seventh Congress from 1801 to 1803. He moved to Philadelphia in 1803, and again was a member of the State House of Representatives in 1805. He was appointed the first president judge of the district court of the city and county of Philadelphia. He was elected as a Federalist member representing Pennsylvania's 1st congressional district in the Sixteenth and Seventeenth Congresses from 1819 to 1823. He was elected as a Jackson Federalist member representing Pennsylvania's 2nd congressional district in the Eighteenth Congress, and reelected as a Jacksonian to the Nineteenth Congress, from 1823 until his resignation in 1826. He was elected as a Jacksonian member representing Pennsylvania's 3rd congressional district in the Twenty-first Congress from 1829 to 1831. He was a member of the State House of Representatives in 1831 and 1832.

Hemphill introduced a bill in 1824 which called for the usage of military personnel to conduct surveys and estimate costs for construction of roads and canals.

He was an anti-slavery advocate and gave a speech to Congress against slavery, especially in Missouri. He declared slavery to be "the forcible oppression of otherwise powerless people".

During the Congressional debate about the Indian Removal Act, Hemphill was split between his support for President Andrew Jackson and his Quaker constituency's opposition to the law. He proposed delaying implementation of the act in order to conduct surveys of the land the Native Americans were to be moved to, but his proposal was voted down.

== Business career ==
In 1831, Hemphill's son, Alexander, entered into a business partnership with William Ellis Tucker for his porcelain factory in Philadelphia. Tucker died in 1832 and the firm was joined by Joseph and his brother Thomas. The factory continued production under the Hemphill name until it closed in 1838.

== Personal life ==
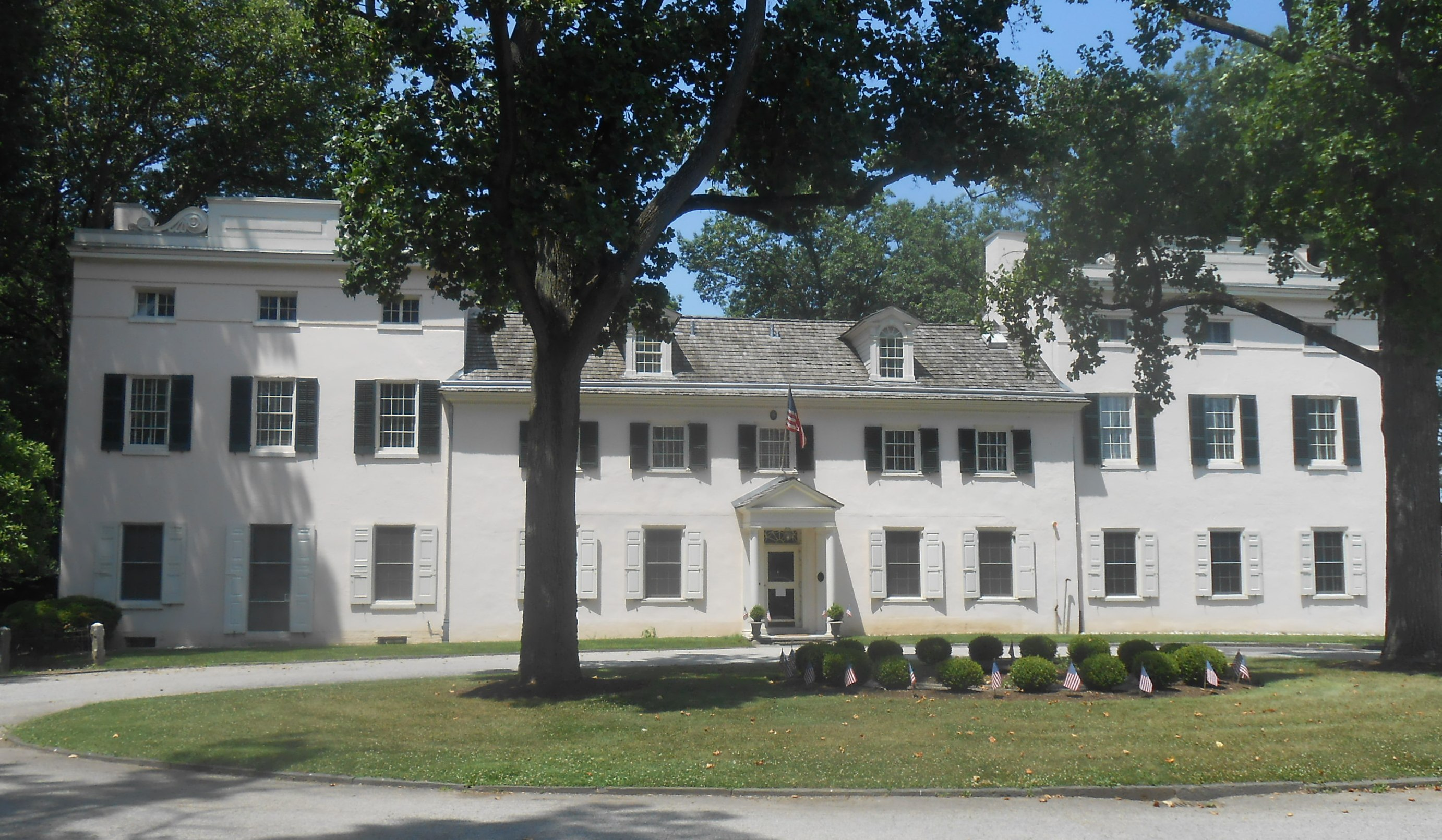
Hemphill purchased Strawberry Mansion from Judge William Lewis in 1821 for usage as a summer home.

He purchased the Historic Strawberry Mansion in Fairmount Park from Judge William Lewis in 1821 and used it as his summer home. He added the Greek Revival wings to the structure and was known to entertain John C. Calhoun from South Carolina and the Marquis de Lafayette from France.

In September, 1806, he married Margaret Coleman, daughter of the wealthy industrialist Robert Coleman from Lancaster, Pennsylvania.

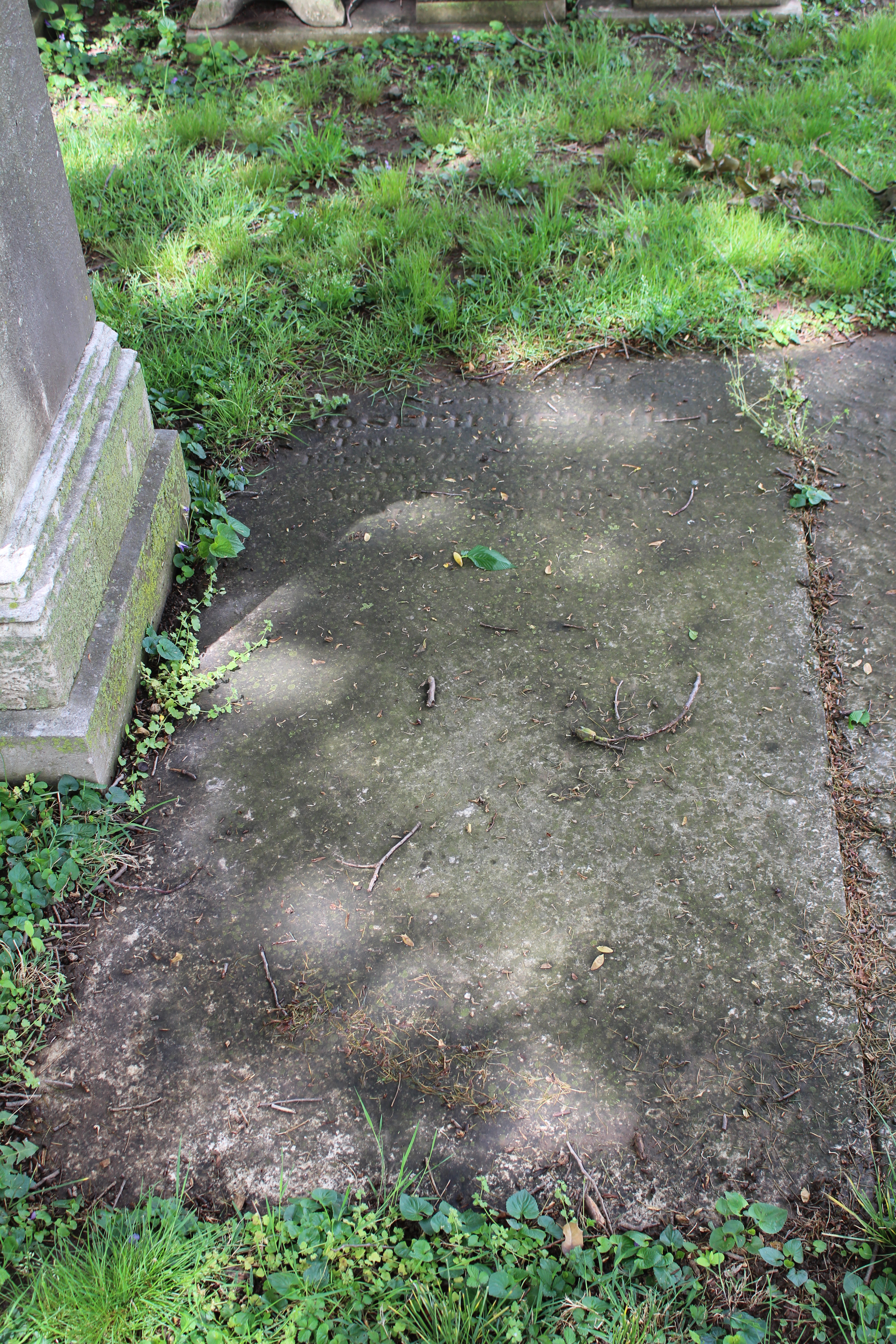
Joseph Hemphill tombstone in Laurel Hill Cemetery

He died in Philadelphia on May 28, 1842, and was interred at Laurel Hill Cemetery.

A descendant, Alexander Hemphill, served as City Controller for Philadelphia from 1958 to 1968.

== Bibliography ==
- Mr. Hemphill's speech in the House of Representatives, on the 14th of January, 1823, on the following bill: To procure the necessary surveys, plans and estimates, on the subject of roads and canals., Washington, D.C., D. Rapine, 1823
- Mr. Hemphill's speech on the bill to construct a national road from Buffalo, passing by the seat of the general government, to New Orleans. Delivered in the House of Representatives, U.S. 23d March, 1830., Washington, D.C., Wm. Greer printer, 1830

== Sources ==
- Wilentz, Sean. 2005. The Rise of American Democracy: Jefferson to Lincoln. W. W. Norton & Company, New York. ISBN 0-393-05820-4.

U.S. House of Representatives
Preceded by Richard Thomas	Member of the U.S. House of Representatives from Pennsylvania's 3rd congressional district March 4, 1801 – March 3, 1803	Succeeded by Isaac Anderson, Joseph Hiester, and John Whitehill
Preceded by William Anderson, Joseph Hopkinson, John Sergeant, and Adam Seybert	Member of the U.S. House of Representatives from Pennsylvania's 1st congressional district March 4, 1819 – March 3, 1823 alongside: Samuel Edwards, John Sergeant, and Thomas Forrest (1819–1821); Samuel Edwards, William Milnor, and John Sergeant (1821–1822); Samuel Edwards, John Sergeant, and Thomas Forrest (1822–1823)	Succeeded by Samuel Breck
Preceded by William Darlington, and Samuel Gross	Member of the U.S. House of Representatives from Pennsylvania's 2nd congressional district March 4, 1823 – 1826	Succeeded by Thomas Kittera
Preceded by Joel Barlow Sutherland	Member of the U.S. House of Representatives from Pennsylvania's 3rd congressional district March 4, 1829 – March 3, 1831	Succeeded by John G. Watmough
