= Thomas Forrest (politician) =

American politician

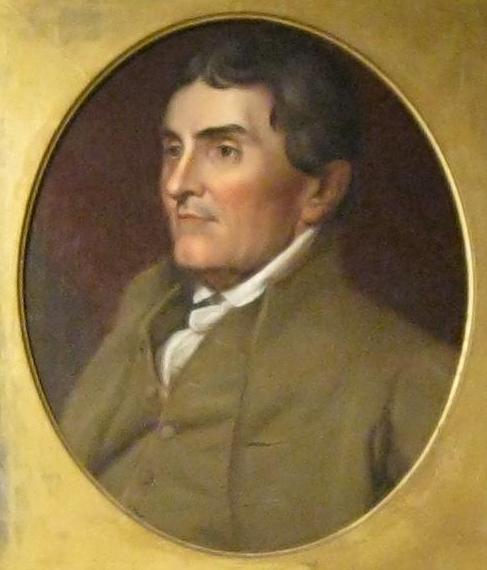
- Thomas Forrest by Charles Willson Peale (c. 1820)

Member of United States House of Representatives from Pennsylvania's 1st congressional district
- In office March 4, 1819 – March 4, 1823

Personal details
- Born: December 7, 1747 Philadelphia, Province of Pennsylvania, British America
- Died: March 20, 1825 (aged 77–78) Germantown, Pennsylvania, U.S.
- Party: Federalist Party
- Spouse: Ann Whitpain

Military service
- Branch/service: Continental Army Artillery
- Years of service: 1776–1781
- Rank: Lieutenant Colonel
- Battles/wars: American Revolutionary War

Thomas Forrest (December 7, 1747 – March 20, 1825) was an American politician. He was member of the 16th Session of the United States Congress, and first chairman of the United States House Committee on Agriculture. He fought in the Continental Army as an artillery officer during the American Revolutionary War.

== Career ==
Forrest was born in Philadelphia in the Province of Pennsylvania. During the American Revolutionary War he was commissioned a captain in Colonel Thomas Proctor's Pennsylvania Artillery Battalion on October 5, 1776. He led a 52-man company of artillery at the Battle of Trenton on December 26, 1776. Situated on high ground at the head of King and Queen Streets, his two brass six-pound cannons and other American guns helped dominate the battlefield. He was promoted to major on March 3, 1777, and lieutenant colonel on December 2, 1778. He resigned October 7, 1781.

Forrest was elected as a Federalist to the 16th Congress. He served as the first chairman of the House Committee on Agriculture, after it was created on May 3, 1820. Seven representatives, under the chairmanship of Forrest, were assigned to the new committee.

He was again elected as a Federalist to the 17th Congress to fill the vacancy caused by the resignation of William Milnor. He was an unsuccessful candidate for reelection in 1822.

He died in Germantown, Pennsylvania, in 1825. His portrait by Charles Willson Peale hangs in Independence National Historical Park in Philadelphia.

U.S. House of Representatives
Preceded by John Sergeant; Joseph Hopkinson; William Anderson; Adam Seybert	Member of the U.S. House of Representatives from Pennsylvania's 1st congressional district 1819–1821 alongside: John Sergeant, Samuel Edwards and Joseph Hemphill	Succeeded by Samuel Edwards; John Sergeant; Joseph Hemphill; William Milnor
Preceded by Samuel Edwards; John Sergeant; Joseph Hemphill; William Milnor	Member of the U.S. House of Representatives from Pennsylvania's 1st congressional district 1822–1823 alongside: John Sergeant, Samuel Edwards and Joseph Hemphill	Succeeded by Samuel Breck
