= George Washington Toland =

American politician (1796-1869)

Member of the Pennsylvania House of Representatives
- In office 1844

Member of the U.S. House of Representatives from Pennsylvania's 2nd district
- In office March 4, 1837 – March 3, 1843
- Preceded by: Joseph R. Ingersoll, James Harper
- Succeeded by: Joseph R. Ingersoll

Member of the Pennsylvania Senate for the 1st district
- In office March 4, 1834 – March 3, 1837
- Preceded by: David S. Hassinger
- Succeeded by: Abraham Miller

Member of the Pennsylvania House of Representatives
- In office 1832–1833

Personal details
- Born: February 8, 1796 Philadelphia, Pennsylvania, U.S.
- Died: January 30, 1869 (aged 72) Philadelphia, Pennsylvania, U.S.
- Resting place: Laurel Hill Cemetery, Philadelphia, Pennsylvania, U.S.
- Party: Democratic, National Republican, Whig

George Washington Toland (February 8, 1796 – January 30, 1869) was an American politician who served as a Whig member of the U.S. House of Representatives for Pennsylvania's 2nd congressional district from 1837 to 1843. He served as a Democratic member of the Pennsylvania House of Representatives from 1832 to 1833, and as a Whig member in 1844. He served as a National Republican member of the Pennsylvania Senate for the 1st district from 1834 to 1835 and as a Democrat from 1835 to 1837.

== Early life and education ==
Toland was born in Philadelphia, Pennsylvania. His father was Henry Toland of Germantown. He attended the common schools, and graduated from Princeton College in 1816. He read law and was admitted to the bar in 1819.

== Career ==
He worked in the insurance business. He served as school director in Philadelphia from 1826 to 1830, as a member and treasurer of the Pennsylvania Institute of the Deaf and Dumb in 1828, as director of the Mechanic's Bank of Philadelphia from 1831 to 1832, and as director of the Philadelphia Board of Trade.

He served as a Democratic member of the Pennsylvania House of Representatives in 1832 and 1833. He was elected to the Pennsylvania State Senate for the 1st district and served as a National Republican from 1833 to 1835 and as a Democrat from 1835 to 1837.

Toland was elected as a Whig to the Twenty-fifth, Twenty-sixth, and Twenty-seventh Congresses.

He served again as a Whig member of the Pennsylvania House of Representatives in 1844. He worked as a director of the Pennsylvania Railroad Company from 1847 to 1849.

He died on January 30, 1869, in Philadelphia and was interred at Laurel Hill Cemetery.

U.S. House of Representatives
Preceded by Joseph R. Ingersoll, James Harper	Member of the U.S. House of Representatives from Pennsylvania's 2nd congressional district 1837–1843 alongside John Sergeant (1837–1841); Joseph R. Ingersoll (1841–1843)	Succeeded by Joseph R. Ingersoll
Pennsylvania State Senate
Preceded by David S. Hassinger	Member of the Pennsylvania Senate, 1st district 1833-1835	Succeeded by Abraham Miller
