= Joseph Reed Ingersoll =

American politician

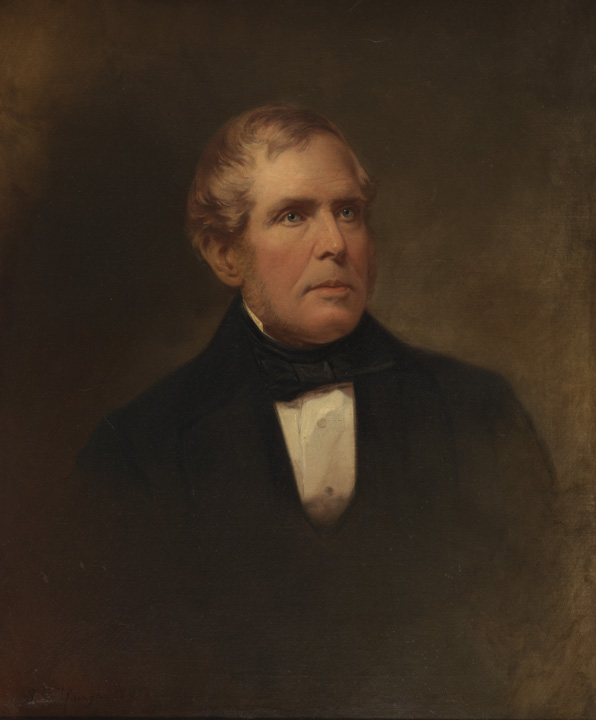

19th United States Minister to Great Britain
- In office August 21, 1852 – August 23, 1853
- President: Millard Fillmore
- Preceded by: Abbott Lawrence
- Succeeded by: James Buchanan

Chair of the House Judiciary Committee
- In office March 4, 1847 – March 4, 1849
- Preceded by: George O. Rathbun
- Succeeded by: James Thompson

Member of the U.S. House of Representatives from Pennsylvania's 2nd district
- In office October 12, 1841 – March 4, 1849
- Preceded by: John Sergeant
- Succeeded by: Joseph R. Chandler
- In office March 4, 1835 – March 4, 1837 Serving with James Harper
- Preceded by: Horace Binney
- Succeeded by: John Sergeant

Personal details
- Born: Joseph Reed Ingersoll; June 14, 1786 Philadelphia, Pennsylvania
- Died: February 20, 1868 (aged 81) Philadelphia, Pennsylvania
- Party: Whig
- Spouse: Ann Wilcocks (m. 1813)
- Parent(s): Jared Ingersoll; Elizabeth Pettit
- Education: Princeton College
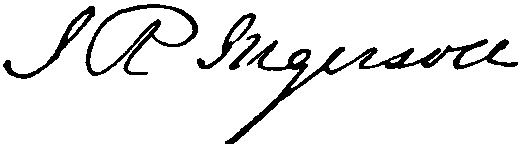
- Signature

Joseph Reed Ingersoll (June 14, 1786 – February 20, 1868) was an American lawyer and statesman from Philadelphia, Pennsylvania. In 1835 he followed his father, Jared Ingersoll, and his older brother, Charles Jared Ingersoll, to represent Pennsylvania in the US House of Representatives.

== Early life, family and education ==
Ingersoll was born and raised in Philadelphia. His father Jared Ingersoll, and his older brother Charles Jared Ingersoll were both members of the US House of Representatives for Pennsylvania.

Ingersoll graduated from Princeton College in 1804. In 1825, he was elected to the American Philosophical Society.

== Career ==
He studied law with his father Jared Ingersoll, was admitted to the bar, and commenced practice in Philadelphia. He was elected in 1834 as a Whig anti-Jacksonian candidate to the 24th Congress. He declined to be a candidate for renomination in 1836, serving 1835–1837. He resumed the practice of law.

Ingersoll was elected as a Whig to the 27th United States Congress to fill the vacancy caused by the resignation of John Sergeant. He was reelected as a Whig to the 28th, 29th, and 30th Congresses. He declined to accept the nomination as a candidate for reelection in 1848. In all, his second stay in office lasted from 1841 to 1849.

He was the chairman of the United States House Committee on the Judiciary during the 30th Congress. He was an advocate for protection and a firm supporter of Henry Clay. One of his noted efforts in the House was a defense of Clay's tariff of 1842.

In 1852, President Millard Fillmore sent him to the UK as the US Minister. He served about a year, and then retired.

== Works ==
In retirement, Ingersoll devoting himself to literary pursuits. Ingersoll was a warm adherent of the Union. At the time of the American Civil War, he prepared an essay, "Secession, a Folly and a Crime." He published a translation from the Latin of Roceus's (Francesco Rocco's) tracts "De Navibus et Naulo" and "De Assecuratione" (Philadelphia, 1809). He authored Memoir of Samuel Breck (1863).

== Personal life ==
The degree of LL.D. was conferred on him by Lafayette College and Bowdoin College in 1836, and that of D.C.L. by University of Oxford in 1845.

He died in Philadelphia in 1868 and was interred in St. Peter's Protestant Episcopal Churchyard.

== Sources ==
- United States Congress. "Joseph Reed Ingersoll (id: I000019)". Biographical Directory of the United States Congress.
- Joseph Ingersoll at The Political Graveyard
- This article incorporates text from a publication now in the public domain: Wilson, J. G.; Fiske, J., eds. (1892). "Ingersoll, Jared" . Appletons' Cyclopædia of American Biography. New York: D. Appleton.

U.S. House of Representatives
Preceded by Horace Binney, James Harper	Member of the U.S. House of Representatives from Pennsylvania's 2nd congressional district 1835–1837 alongside James Harper	Succeeded by John Sergeant and George Washington Toland
Preceded by John Sergeant	Member of the U.S. House of Representatives from Pennsylvania's 2nd congressional district 1841–1849 alongside George Washington Toland (1841–1843)	Succeeded by Joseph R. Chandler
Diplomatic posts
Preceded by Abbott Lawrence	US Minister to Britain; 1852–1853	Succeeded by James Buchanan
