= Benjamin Wood Richards =

59th mayor of Philadelphia (1797–1851)

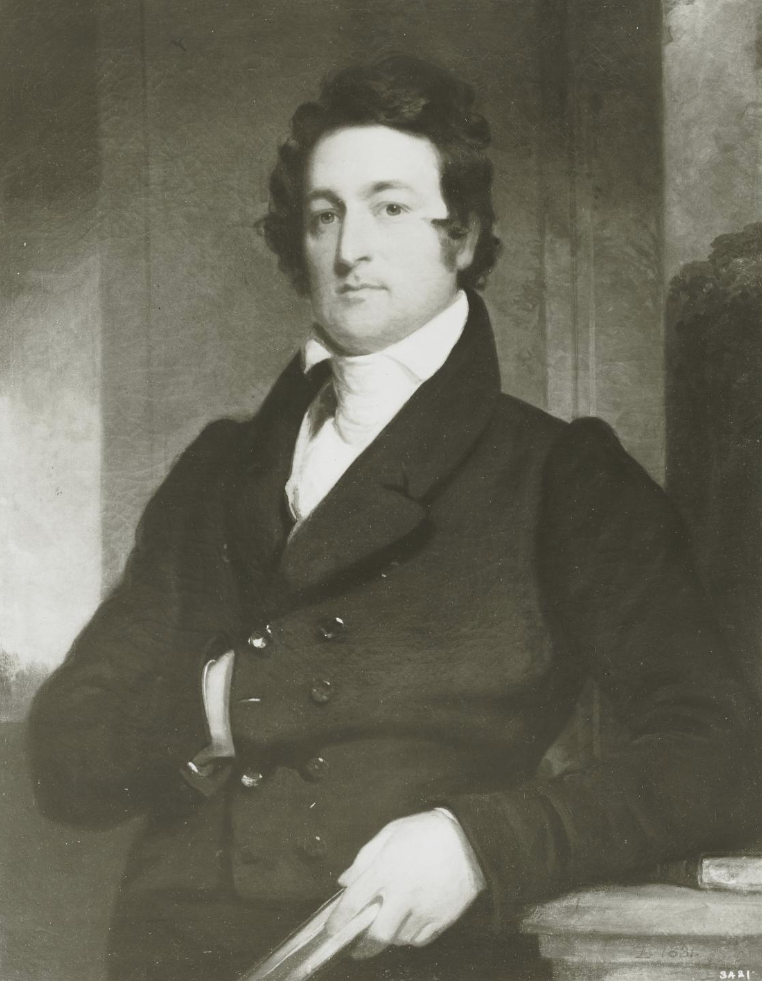
- Thomas Sully portrait (1831)

59th Mayor of Philadelphia
- In office 1829–1829
- Preceded by: George M. Dallas
- Succeeded by: William Milnor
- In office 1830–1832
- Preceded by: William Milnor
- Succeeded by: John Swift

Personal details
- Born: November 12, 1797 Batsto, New Jersey, U.S.
- Died: July 12, 1851 (aged 53) Philadelphia, Pennsylvania, U.S.
- Resting place: Laurel Hill Cemetery, Philadelphia, Pennsylvania, U.S.
- Party: Democratic
- Spouse: Sarah Ann Lippincott
- Occupation: Lawyer, politician

Benjamin Wood Richards (November 12, 1797 – July 12, 1851) was an American politician who served as the 59th mayor of Philadelphia in 1829 and a second time from 1830 to 1832.

== Early life and education ==
Richards was born in Batsto, New Jersey, on November 12, 1797, to Magaretta (Wood) and William Richards. In 1815, he graduated from Princeton University.

== Career ==
In 1819, he established Richards & Bispham, which became the largest commission house in Philadelphia. He served on the Philadelphia City Council and in 1827, served as a member of the Pennsylvania Legislature. He was a proponent of the common school system and served on the first Board of Control of Public Schools for Philadelphia. He served as an original member of the City Board of Controllers and in 1829, was elected as a Canal Commissioner. He was appointed as a director of the United States Bank and the United States Mint by President Andrew Jackson.

He served as mayor of Philadelphia in 1829, after the resignation of George M. Dallas, and again from 1830 to 1832. After leaving office, Richards served as trustee of Girard College and the University of Pennsylvania. He founded the Girard Life Insurance, Annuity and Trust Company in 1836 and served as president. He was a member of the American Philosophical Society. He was one of the organizers of Laurel Hill Cemetery. He was a founder of the Asylum for the Blind and a director at the Deaf and Dumb Asylum.

He died in Philadelphia on July 12, 1851, and was interred at Laurel Hill Cemetery.

== Personal life ==
He married Sarah Ann Lippincott, daughter of Joshua Lippincott, in 1821, and together they had seven children.

His older half brother, Samuel Richards, was a prominent iron manufacturer in New Jersey during the early-mid 19th century.

Political offices
Preceded by George M. Dallas	Mayor of Philadelphia; 1829	Succeeded by William Milnor
Preceded by William Milnor	Mayor of Philadelphia; 1830–1832	Succeeded by John Swift
