= Samuel Edwards (Pennsylvania politician) =

American politician

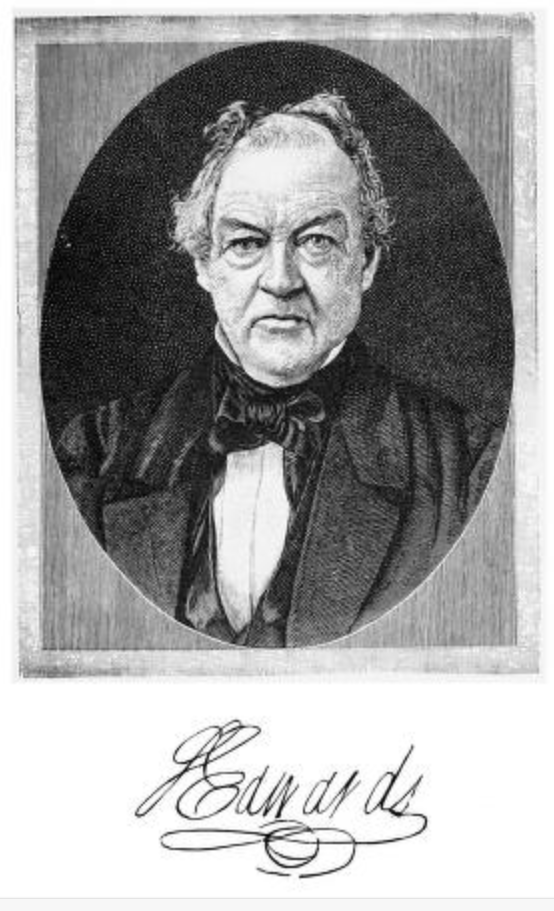

Member of the U.S. House of Representatives from Pennsylvania
- In office March 4, 1819 – March 3, 1827
- Preceded by: John Sergeant; Joseph Hopkinson; William Anderson; Adam Seybert
- Succeeded by: James Buchanan; Samuel Anderson; Charles Miner
- Constituency: 1st district (1819–1823); 4th district (1823–1827)

Personal details
- Born: March 12, 1785 Chester Township, Pennsylvania
- Died: November 21, 1850 (aged 65) Chester, Pennsylvania
- Party: Federalist; Jacksonian Federalist; Jacksonian

Samuel Edwards (March 12, 1785 – November 21, 1850) was an American politician from Pennsylvania who served as a member of the U.S. House of Representatives from Pennsylvania's 1st congressional district from 1819 to 1823 and from Pennsylvania's 4th congressional district from 1823 to 1827.

== Early life ==
Samuel Edwards was born in Chester Township, Pennsylvania. He studied law, was admitted to the Delaware County bar in 1806 and commenced practice in Chester, Pennsylvania.

Edwards was originally a Federalist and was chairman of the 1812 meeting in Chester, Pennsylvania that denounced Congress for declaring war on Great Britain. However once the war was on he supported the U.S. effort. In April 1813, he and Thomas D. Anderson applied to the state and provided their personal funds as bond for military provisions and ammunition to arm a company of Soldiers from Chester during the War of 1812. The military provisions were sent to the Battle of Frenchtown to help fight the attack by British Admiral George Cockburn. The Chester troops marched to Elkton, Maryland to resist the British Forces.

In the summer of 1814, when Dr. Samuel Anderson raised the Mifflin Guards, Edwards joined as a private and served as company clerk.

== Career ==
While still in active service, Edwards was elected as a member of the Pennsylvania House of Representatives from 1814 to 1816.

In 1819, Edwards was elected as a Federalist to the Sixteenth and Seventeenth Congresses and served until 1823. Edwards gradually fell away from the Federalist party. He trained under the leadership of Henry Clay but did not follow him into the Whig Party.

In 1825 Edwards was elected as a Jackson Federalist to the Eighteenth Congress from Pennsylvania's 4th congressional district and reelected as a Jacksonian to the Nineteenth Congress. He served as chairman of the United States House Committee on Expenditures in the Department of the Navy during the Seventeenth and Eighteenth Congresses.

After leaving Congress in 1827, Edwards resumed the practice of law in Chester, Pennsylvania. In 1832, he was elected Chief Burgess of Chester and served as Inspector of Customs in Chester from 1838 to 1842.

He was a director of the Delaware County National Bank and the Delaware Mutual Insurance Company. He also served as counsel for the Philadelphia, Wilmington and Baltimore Railroad.

== Personal life ==
Edwards daughter married the General and frontiersman Edward Fitzgerald Beale and his granddaughter married the last Czarist Russian Ambassador to the United States, George Bakhmeteff.

He died in Chester in 1850 and was interred in Chester Rural Cemetery.

== Sources ==
- United States Congress. "Samuel Edwards (id: E000080)". Biographical Directory of the United States Congress.
- The Political Graveyard

U.S. House of Representatives
Preceded by John Sergeant; Joseph Hopkinson; William Anderson; Adam Seybert	Member of the U.S. House of Representatives from Pennsylvania's 1st congressional district 1819–1823 1819–1823 alongside: Joseph Hemphill and John Sergeant; 1819–1821, 1822–1823 alongside: Thomas Forrest; 1821–1822 alongside: William Milnor	Succeeded by Samuel Breck
Preceded by James S. Mitchell	Member of the U.S. House of Representatives from Pennsylvania's 4th congressional district 1823–1827 1823–1827 alongside: James Buchanan; 1823–1825 alongside: Isaac Wayne; 1825–1827 alongside: Charles Miner	Succeeded by James Buchanan; Samuel Anderson; Charles Miner
