= Judge Hopkinson =

Judge Hopkinson may refer to:

- Francis Hopkinson (1737–1791), judge of the United States District Court for the District of Pennsylvania
- Joseph Hopkinson (1770–1842), judge of the United States District Court for the Eastern District of Pennsylvania
