= John Conard =

American politician

Member of the U.S. House of Representatives from Pennsylvania's 1st district
- In office March 4, 1813 – March 3, 1815
- Preceded by: Adam Seybert, William Anderson, James Milnor
- Succeeded by: Joseph Hopkinson, William Milnor, Thomas Smith, Jonathan Williams

Personal details
- Born: November 15, 1773 Chester Valley, Province of Pennsylvania, British America
- Died: May 9, 1857 (aged 83) Philadelphia, Pennsylvania, U.S.
- Party: Democratic-Republican

John Conard (November 15, 1773 – May 9, 1857) was a member of the U.S. House of Representatives from Pennsylvania. He was nicknamed the "Fighting Quaker".

John Conard was born in Chester Valley in the Province of Pennsylvania. He was educated at the Friends School. He moved to Germantown, Pennsylvania about 1795. He studied law, was admitted to the bar and practiced. He was a professor of mathematics at the local academy in Germantown.

Conard was elected as a Democratic-Republican to the Thirteenth Congress. He declined to be a candidate for renomination in 1814. He was the associate judge of the district court. He was appointed United States marshal for the United States District Court for the Eastern District of Pennsylvania by President James Monroe. He was reappointed by President John Quincy Adams and served two years under President Andrew Jackson. He retired from public life in 1832, and moved to Maryland about 1834 and settled in Cecil County near Port Deposit, where he lived until 1851, when he moved to Philadelphia. He died in Philadelphia in 1857. Interment in St. Mary Anne's Episcopal Churchyard in North East, Maryland.

== Sources ==
- United States Congress. "John Conard (id: C000667)". Biographical Directory of the United States Congress.
- The Political Graveyard

U.S. House of Representatives
Preceded by Adam Seybert; William Anderson; James Milnor	Member of the U.S. House of Representatives from Pennsylvania's 1st congressional district 1813–1815 alongside: Adam Seybert, William Anderson and Charles J. Ingersoll	Succeeded by Joseph Hopkinson; William Milnor; Thomas Smith; Jonathan Williams
