= Samuel Breck (politician) =

American politician

Member of the U.S. House of Representatives from Pennsylvania's 1st district
- In office March 4, 1823 – March 3, 1825
- Preceded by: Joseph Hemphill; John Sergeant; Thomas Forrest; Samuel Edwards
- Succeeded by: Daniel H. Miller

Member of the Pennsylvania Senate for the 2nd district
- In office 1832–1834

Member of the Pennsylvania House of Representatives
- In office 1817–1820

Personal details
- Born: July 17, 1771 Boston, Province of Massachusetts Bay, British America
- Died: August 31, 1862 (aged 91) Philadelphia, Pennsylvania, US
- Party: Federalist

Samuel Breck (July 17, 1771 – August 31, 1862) was an American politician from Pennsylvania who served as a member of the U.S. House of Representatives for Pennsylvania's 1st congressional district from 1823 to 1825.

== Life ==
Samuel Breck (brother of Daniel Breck) was born in Boston, Province of Massachusetts Bay. His parents were Samuel Breck and Hannah Andrews. His father was a wealthy merchant in Boston, and the family mansion adjacent to Boston Common was often visited by foreign travelers.

He began his education at Boston Latin School. In 1783, Breck attended the Royal Military School of Loreze, France. He completed his studies in France in 1787. Although he was somewhat drawn to Catholicism in France, he remained an Episcopalian his whole life.

In 1790 his father gave him $10,000 to set up as a merchant on Boston's Long Wharf. He moved to Pennsylvania, and settled in Philadelphia in 1792, where he engaged in business as a merchant. He served as a corporal during the Whiskey Rebellion. On December 24, 1795, he married Jean Ross, the daughter of a leading Philadelphia merchant. Besides his role in business, he was also an essayist and orator. He founded a group called the Sons of New England.

Breck was a member of the Pennsylvania State Senate from 1817 to 1821. In February 1821, he was the lead sponsor of a law that would have immediately emancipated all enslaved persons living in Pennsylvania. When this failed, he sponsored another bill which would have amended the state's existing gradual abolition law. This bill failed as well. He returned to the state assembly as the senator for Pennsylvania's District 2 from 1832 to 1834. He was elected as a member to the American Philosophical Society in 1838.

Breck was elected as an Adams-Clay Federalist to the Eighteenth Congress. He withdrew from active business pursuits and lived in retirement. In 1861 he spoke publicly at a meeting in Philadelphia urging the people to preserve the constitution he had been alive to help form.

== Death ==
Breck died in Philadelphia in 1862.

== Works ==
- Sketch of the Internal Improvements Already Made by Pennsylvania: With Observations Upon Her Physical and Fiscal Means for Their Extension; Particularly as They Have Reference to the Future Growth and Prosperity of Philadelphia. M. Thomas, 1818.

== Bibliography ==
Wainwright, Nicholas B. The Diary of Samuel Breck, 1814–1835, 1838. Pennsylvania Magazine of History and Biography 102 (October 1978): 469–508; 103 (1979): 85–113, 222–51, 356–82.

== Notes ==
U.S. House of Representatives
Preceded by Joseph Hemphill; John Sergeant; Thomas Forrest; Samuel Edwards	Member of the U.S. House of Representatives from Pennsylvania's 1st congressional district 1823–1825	Succeeded by Daniel H. Miller
Pennsylvania State Senate
Preceded by Peter Hay	Member of the Pennsylvania Senate, 2nd district 1832-1834	Succeeded by Joseph Taylor
