= Mary Simpson (house servant) =

American domestic worker

Mary Simpson (c.1752-1758, in Virginia – March 18, 1836 in New York, New York) was an African-American woman who claimed to be a former slave of George Washington. She is credited with originating the tradition of celebrating Washington's Birthday in New York City.

== Biography ==
Simpson worked as a laundress, and later ran a bakeshop in New York's financial district. She celebrated Washington's birthday by opening the doors of her shop to local businessmen and merchants, serving cakes and whisky punch. She is credited with the creation of "Washington's Cake", a traditional ginger cake that is said to have been part of her annual open house celebrations. Her story was often retold throughout the 19th century.

Close by this old market, at the corner of Cliff and John Streets, lived a colored woman named Mary Simpson, who originated the observance of Washington’s birthday in New York City. She had been a slave in the family of General Washington, who set her free while living in New York. She opened a little store in the basement of her house, where she sold milk, butter, and eggs, with cookies, pies and sweetmeats of her own manufacture; and she also took in washing for several gentlemen who resided in the neighborhood. She never forgot her old master’s birthday, nor did she want her friends or patrons to forget it, as that day was above all the holidays with her; and she kept it most faithfully, by preparing a very large cake, which she called ‘Washington Cake’ (once a favorite of Washington), a large quantity of punch, then a fashionable drink, and hot coffee. These were nicely arranged upon a large table; then against the wall hung an old portrait of Washington, and near it was displayed a small leather trunk, on which was marked the initials ‘G.W.,’ made in brass-nail heads; both of which had been given her by Washington himself.

Simpson claimed to have been enslaved by George Washington. The 1786 Mount Vernon Slave Census does not list anyone named "Mary," and the only "Mary" listed in the 1799 Mount Vernon Slave Census was an 11-year-old girl. She stated that she had worked in Washington's presidential household in New York City (1789–1790), but she is not one of the seven slaves who have been documented there. She further claimed that President Washington freed her during his tenure in New York City, although there is no record of this.

She was a friend of Sojourner Truth, and was described as a "doer of the Word," performing acts of charity among her fellow New Yorkers. Simpson attended St. George's Episcopal Church and befriended Reverend James Milnor.

She died on March 18, 1836. Her obituary in the Commercial Advertiser listed her name as "Mary Washington." New York City public records listed her as "Mary Simpson."
