= Jonathan Williams Plaza =

Public housing development in Brooklyn, New York

Williams Plaza
- NYCHA Property
- Jonathan Williams Plaza
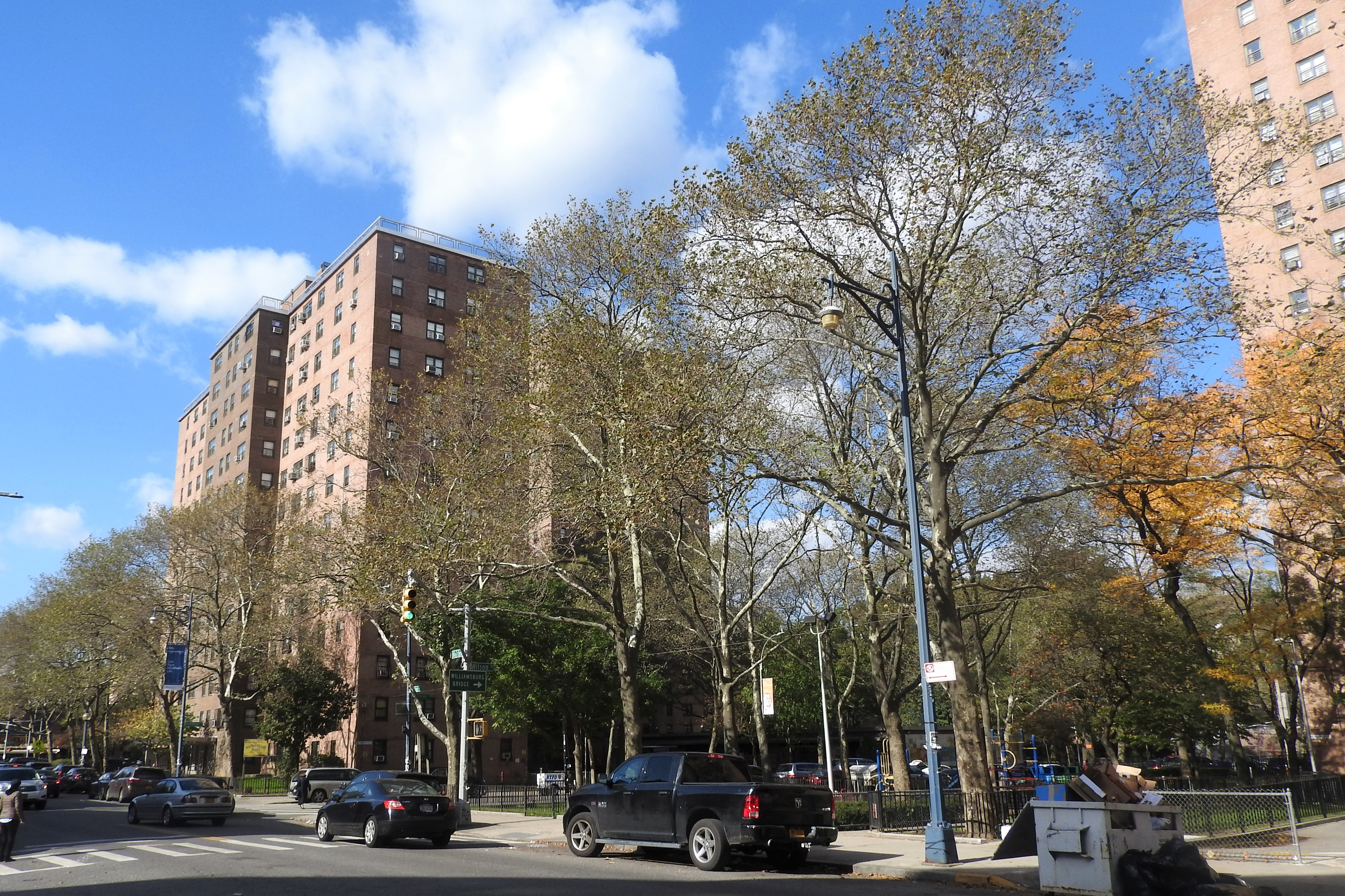
- Interactive map of Williams Plaza
- Country: United States
- State: New York
- City: New York City
- Borough: Brooklyn

Area
  - Total: 5.64 acres (2.28 ha)

Population
  - Total: 1,290
- Zip Code: 11211

Jonathan Williams Plaza is an NYCHA housing project that has 5 buildings. Buildings I, III, and IV has 21 stories while Buildings II and V has 14 stories. It is located between Roebling Street to Marcy Avenue and also between Broadway and Division Avenue in Williamsburg, Brooklyn.

== History ==
The first residents began moving into the housing project in November 1963 and the complex was completed in April 1964. Named after Jonathan Williams, the engineer who surveyed the Williamsburg area after the Revolutionary War, the project was designed by the architecture firm of Eggers & Higgins.

=== 21st century ===
In 2020, NYCHA finalized the 7th Permanent Affordability Commitment Together (PACT) transaction to provide more than $370M for major repairs and renovations throughout Brooklyn for nine NYCHA complexes including this project. It will renovate each of the apartment interiors, the elevators, heating rehabilitation, improve security systems, and extensive mold & lead abatement repairs.

== See also ==
- New York City Housing Authority
