= Pennsylvania's 1st congressional district =

U.S. House district for Pennsylvania

Coordinates: 39°55′40″N 75°12′51″W

- Interactive map of district boundaries since January 3, 2023 (Bucks County outlined in red)
- Representative: Brian Fitzpatrick; R–Levittown
- Population (2025): 757,648
- Median household income: $117,354
- Ethnicity: 79.9% White; 6.3% Asian; 6.1% Hispanic; 4.0% Black; 3.3% Two or more races; 0.5% other
- Cook PVI: D+1

Pennsylvania's first congressional district includes all of Bucks County and a sliver of Montgomery County in southeastern Pennsylvania. It has been represented by Brian Fitzpatrick since 2019.

The state congressional district map was redrawn by the Supreme Court of Pennsylvania in February 2018 after ruling the previous map unconstitutional due to partisan gerrymandering; the previous 1st district was geographically succeeded by the newly redrawn 2nd district which on November 6, 2018, elected Brendan Boyle, the incumbent from the 13th district. The new first district is similar to the previous eighth district, with the new boundaries going into effect for the 2018 elections and representation thereafter. It is the wealthiest congressional district in the state of Pennsylvania.

Fitzpatrick, the incumbent from the previous 8th district, was elected on November 6, 2018, to the newly redrawn 1st district. Prior to 2018, the district had generally been based in Philadelphia. Only minor changes were made to the district after redistricting following the 2020 census.

The district was one of three congressional districts that voted for Kamala Harris in the 2024 presidential election while simultaneously electing a Republican in the concurrent House of Representatives elections.

== Recent election results from statewide races ==
Year	Office	Results
2008	President	Obama 54% - 45%
2008	Attorney General	Corbett 54% - 46%
2008	Auditor General	Wagner 54% - 46%
2010	Senate	Toomey 54% - 46%
2010	Governor	Corbett 56% - 44%
2012	President	Obama 50.4% - 49.6%
2012	Senate	Casey Jr. 52% - 48%
2014	Governor	Wolf 52% - 48%
2016	President	Clinton 48.5% - 47.8%
2016	Senate	Toomey 52% - 46%
2016	Attorney General	Shapiro 51% - 49%
2016	Auditor General	Brown 51% - 46%
2016	Treasurer	Torsella 49% - 48%
2018	Senate	Casey Jr. 56% - 42%
2018	Governor	Wolf 58% - 40%
2020	President	Biden 52% - 47%
2020	Attorney General	Shapiro 51% - 46%
2020	Auditor General	DeFoor 50% - 47%
2020	Treasurer	Torsella 49% - 48%
2022	Senate	Fetterman 52% - 45%
2022	Governor	Shapiro 59% - 39%
2024	President	Harris 50% - 49%
2024	Senate	Casey Jr. 49% - 48%
2024	Attorney General	Sunday 52% - 46%
2024	Auditor General	DeFoor 51% - 46%
2024	Treasurer	Garrity 52% - 46%

== Counties and municipalities ==
Bucks County (73)
All 73 municipalities

Montgomery County (13)

East Greenville, Franconia Township, Hatfield Borough, Hatfield Township, Horsham Township (part; also 4th; includes part of Horsham CDP and Maple Glen), Marlborough Township, Montgomery Township, Pennsburg, Red Hill, Salford Township, Souderton, Telford (shared with Bucks County), Upper Hanover Township

== List of members representing the district ==
The district was organized from Pennsylvania's at-large congressional district in 1791.

=== 1791–1793: one seat ===
Representative	Party	Years	Cong ress	Electoral history
District first established March 4, 1791
Thomas Fitzsimons (Philadelphia)	Pro-Administration	March 4, 1791 – March 3, 1793	2nd	Redistricted from the at-large district and re-elected in 1791. Redistricted to the at-large district.

=== 1795–1803: one seat ===
The district was organized from Pennsylvania's at-large congressional district in 1795.

Representative	Party	Years	Cong ress	Electoral history
John Swanwick (Philadelphia)	Democratic-Republican	March 4, 1795 – August 1, 1798	4th 5th	Elected in 1794. Re-elected in 1796. Died.
Vacant		August 1, 1798 – December 3, 1798	5th	
Robert Waln (Philadelphia)	Federalist	December 3, 1798 – March 3, 1801	5th 6th	Elected October 9, 1798 to finish Swanwick's term and seated December 3, 1798. Elected the same day to the next term. Retired.
William Jones (Philadelphia)	Democratic-Republican	March 4, 1801 – March 3, 1803	7th	Elected in 1800. Retired.

=== 1803–1813: three seats ===
The district was reorganized in 1803 to have 3 at-large seats on a general ticket. The district was apportioned a fourth seat in 1813, also elected on a general ticket.

Cong ress	Years	Seat A			Seat B			Seat C		
Cong ress	Years	Representative	Party	Electoral history	Representative	Party	Electoral history	Representative	Party	Electoral history
8th	March 4, 1803 – March 3, 1805	Joseph Clay (Philadelphia)	Democratic-Republican	Elected in 1802. Re-elected in 1804. Re-elected in 1806. Resigned.	Jacob Richards (Chester)	Democratic-Republican	Elected in 1802. Re-elected in 1804. Re-elected in 1806. Retired.	Michael Leib (Philadelphia)	Democratic-Republican	Elected in 1802. Re-elected in 1804. Resigned.
9th	March 4, 1805 – February 14, 1806	Joseph Clay (Philadelphia)	Democratic-Republican	Elected in 1802. Re-elected in 1804. Re-elected in 1806. Resigned.	Jacob Richards (Chester)	Democratic-Republican	Elected in 1802. Re-elected in 1804. Re-elected in 1806. Retired.	Michael Leib (Philadelphia)	Democratic-Republican	Elected in 1802. Re-elected in 1804. Resigned.
9th	February 14, 1806 – December 8, 1806	Joseph Clay (Philadelphia)	Democratic-Republican	Elected in 1802. Re-elected in 1804. Re-elected in 1806. Resigned.	Jacob Richards (Chester)	Democratic-Republican	Elected in 1802. Re-elected in 1804. Re-elected in 1806. Retired.	Vacant		
9th	December 8, 1806 – March 3, 1807	Joseph Clay (Philadelphia)	Democratic-Republican	Elected in 1802. Re-elected in 1804. Re-elected in 1806. Resigned.	Jacob Richards (Chester)	Democratic-Republican	Elected in 1802. Re-elected in 1804. Re-elected in 1806. Retired.	John Porter (Philadelphia)	Democratic-Republican	Elected in 1806. Later elected to finish Leib's term. Re-elected in 1808. Lost re-election.
10th	March 4, 1807 – March 28, 1808	Joseph Clay (Philadelphia)	Democratic-Republican	Elected in 1802. Re-elected in 1804. Re-elected in 1806. Resigned.	Jacob Richards (Chester)	Democratic-Republican	Elected in 1802. Re-elected in 1804. Re-elected in 1806. Retired.	John Porter (Philadelphia)	Democratic-Republican	Elected in 1806. Later elected to finish Leib's term. Re-elected in 1808. Lost re-election.
10th	March 28, 1808 – November 16, 1808	Vacant			Jacob Richards (Chester)	Democratic-Republican	Elected in 1802. Re-elected in 1804. Re-elected in 1806. Retired.	John Porter (Philadelphia)	Democratic-Republican	Elected in 1806. Later elected to finish Leib's term. Re-elected in 1808. Lost re-election.
10th	November 16, 1808 – March 3, 1809	Benjamin Say (Philadelphia)	Democratic-Republican	Elected to finish Clay's term. Re-elected in 1808. Resigned.	Jacob Richards (Chester)	Democratic-Republican	Elected in 1802. Re-elected in 1804. Re-elected in 1806. Retired.	John Porter (Philadelphia)	Democratic-Republican	Elected in 1806. Later elected to finish Leib's term. Re-elected in 1808. Lost re-election.
11th	March 4, 1809 – June 1809	Benjamin Say (Philadelphia)	Democratic-Republican	Elected to finish Clay's term. Re-elected in 1808. Resigned.	William Anderson (Chester)	Democratic-Republican	Elected in 1808. Re-elected in 1810.	John Porter (Philadelphia)	Democratic-Republican	Elected in 1806. Later elected to finish Leib's term. Re-elected in 1808. Lost re-election.
11th	June 1809 – October 10, 1809	Vacant			William Anderson (Chester)	Democratic-Republican	Elected in 1808. Re-elected in 1810.	John Porter (Philadelphia)	Democratic-Republican	Elected in 1806. Later elected to finish Leib's term. Re-elected in 1808. Lost re-election.
11th	October 10, 1809 – March 3, 1811	Adam Seybert (Philadelphia)	Democratic-Republican	Elected to finish Anderson's term. Re-elected in 1810.	William Anderson (Chester)	Democratic-Republican	Elected in 1808. Re-elected in 1810.	John Porter (Philadelphia)	Democratic-Republican	Elected in 1806. Later elected to finish Leib's term. Re-elected in 1808. Lost re-election.
12th	March 4, 1811 – March 3, 1813	Adam Seybert (Philadelphia)	Democratic-Republican	Elected to finish Anderson's term. Re-elected in 1810.	William Anderson (Chester)	Democratic-Republican	Elected in 1808. Re-elected in 1810.	James Milnor (Philadelphia)	Federalist	Elected in 1810. Retired.

=== 1813–1823: four seats ===
Cong ress	Years	Seat A			Seat B			Seat C			Seat D		
Cong ress	Years	Representative	Party	Electoral history	Representative	Party	Electoral history	Representative	Party	Electoral history	Representative	Party	Electoral history
13th	March 4, 1813 – March 3, 1815	Adam Seybert (Philadelphia)	Democratic-Republican	Re-elected in 1812. Lost re-election.	William Anderson (Chester)	Democratic-Republican	Re-elected in 1812. Lost re-election.	Charles J. Ingersoll (Philadelphia)	Democratic-Republican	Elected in 1812. Lost re-election.	John Conard (Germantown)	Democratic-Republican	Elected in 1812. Retired.
14th	March 4, 1815 – May 16, 1815	William Milnor (Philadelphia)	Federalist	Elected in 1814. Lost re-election.	Thomas Smith (Darby)	Federalist	Elected in 1814. Retired.	Joseph Hopkinson (Philadelphia)	Federalist	Elected in 1814. Re-elected in 1816. Retired.	Jonathan Williams (Philadelphia)	Democratic-Republican	Elected in 1814. Died.
14th	May 16, 1815 – October 10, 1815	William Milnor (Philadelphia)	Federalist	Elected in 1814. Lost re-election.	Thomas Smith (Darby)	Federalist	Elected in 1814. Retired.	Joseph Hopkinson (Philadelphia)	Federalist	Elected in 1814. Re-elected in 1816. Retired.	Vacant		
14th	October 10, 1815 – March 3, 1817	William Milnor (Philadelphia)	Federalist	Elected in 1814. Lost re-election.	Thomas Smith (Darby)	Federalist	Elected in 1814. Retired.	Joseph Hopkinson (Philadelphia)	Federalist	Elected in 1814. Re-elected in 1816. Retired.	John Sergeant (Philadelphia)	Federalist	Elected to finish Williams's term. Re-elected in 1816. Re-elected in 1818. Re-elected in 1820. Retired.
15th	March 4, 1817 – March 3, 1819	Adam Seybert (Philadelphia)	Democratic-Republican	Elected in 1816. Lost re-election.	William Anderson (Chester)	Democratic-Republican	Elected in 1816. Lost re-election.	Joseph Hopkinson (Philadelphia)	Federalist	Elected in 1814. Re-elected in 1816. Retired.	John Sergeant (Philadelphia)	Federalist	Elected to finish Williams's term. Re-elected in 1816. Re-elected in 1818. Re-elected in 1820. Retired.
16th	March 4, 1819 – March 3, 1821	Thomas Forrest (Germantown)	Federalist	Elected in 1818. Lost re-election.	Joseph Hemphill (Philadelphia)	Federalist	Elected in 1818. Re-elected in 1820. Redistricted to the 2nd district and won re-election.	Samuel Edwards (Chester)	Federalist	Elected in 1818. Re-elected in 1820. Redistricted to the 4th district and won re-election.	John Sergeant (Philadelphia)	Federalist	Elected to finish Williams's term. Re-elected in 1816. Re-elected in 1818. Re-elected in 1820. Retired.
17th	March 4, 1821 – May 8, 1822	William Milnor (Philadelphia)	Federalist	Elected in 1820. Resigned.	Joseph Hemphill (Philadelphia)	Federalist	Elected in 1818. Re-elected in 1820. Redistricted to the 2nd district and won re-election.	Samuel Edwards (Chester)	Federalist	Elected in 1818. Re-elected in 1820. Redistricted to the 4th district and won re-election.	John Sergeant (Philadelphia)	Federalist	Elected to finish Williams's term. Re-elected in 1816. Re-elected in 1818. Re-elected in 1820. Retired.
17th	May 8, 1822 – October 8, 1822	Vacant			Joseph Hemphill (Philadelphia)	Federalist	Elected in 1818. Re-elected in 1820. Redistricted to the 2nd district and won re-election.	Samuel Edwards (Chester)	Federalist	Elected in 1818. Re-elected in 1820. Redistricted to the 4th district and won re-election.	John Sergeant (Philadelphia)	Federalist	Elected to finish Williams's term. Re-elected in 1816. Re-elected in 1818. Re-elected in 1820. Retired.
17th	October 8, 1822 – March 3, 1823	Thomas Forrest (Philadelphia)	Federalist	Elected to finish Milnor's term, but on the same day lost election to the next term when redistricted to the 3rd district.	Joseph Hemphill (Philadelphia)	Federalist	Elected in 1818. Re-elected in 1820. Redistricted to the 2nd district and won re-election.	Samuel Edwards (Chester)	Federalist	Elected in 1818. Re-elected in 1820. Redistricted to the 4th district and won re-election.	John Sergeant (Philadelphia)	Federalist	Elected to finish Williams's term. Re-elected in 1816. Re-elected in 1818. Re-elected in 1820. Retired.

=== 1823–present: one seat ===
The district was reorganized in 1823 to have one seat.

Member	Party	Years	Cong ress	Electoral history	Location
Samuel Breck (Philadelphia)	Adams-Clay; Federalist	March 4, 1823 – March 3, 1825	18th	Elected in 1822. Retired.	1823–1833 [data missing]
John Wurts (Philadelphia)	Jacksonian	March 4, 1825 – March 3, 1827	19th	Elected in 1824. Retired.	1823–1833 [data missing]
Joel B. Sutherland (Philadelphia)	Jacksonian	March 4, 1827 – February 1833	20th 21st 22nd	Elected in 1826. Re-elected in 1828. Re-elected in 1830. Re-elected in 1832 but resigned to become a judge.	1823–1833 [data missing]
Vacant		February 1833 – October 8, 1833	22nd 23rd		1823–1833 [data missing]
Vacant		February 1833 – October 8, 1833	22nd 23rd		1833–1843 [data missing]
Joel B. Sutherland (Philadelphia)	Jacksonian	October 8, 1833 – March 3, 1837	23rd 24th	Elected to finish his vacant term. Re-elected in 1834. Lost re-election.	1833–1843 [data missing]
Lemuel Paynter (Philadelphia)	Democratic	March 4, 1837 – March 3, 1841	25th 26th	Elected in 1836. Re-elected in 1838. Retired.	1833–1843 [data missing]
Charles Brown (Philadelphia)	Democratic	March 4, 1841 – March 3, 1843	27th	Elected in 1840. Retired.	1833–1843 [data missing]
Edward J. Morris (Philadelphia)	Whig	March 4, 1843 – March 3, 1845	28th	Elected in 1843. [data missing]	1843–1853 [data missing]
Lewis C. Levin (Philadelphia)	American	March 4, 1845 – March 3, 1851	29th 30th 31st	Elected in 1844. Re-elected in 1846. Re-elected in 1848. Lost re-election.	1843–1853 [data missing]
Thomas B. Florence (Philadelphia)	Democratic	March 4, 1851 – March 3, 1861	32nd 33rd 34th 35th 36th	Elected in 1850. Re-elected in 1852. Re-elected in 1854. Re-elected in 1856. Re-elected in 1858. Lost re-election.	1843–1853 [data missing]
Thomas B. Florence (Philadelphia)	Democratic	March 4, 1851 – March 3, 1861	32nd 33rd 34th 35th 36th	Elected in 1850. Re-elected in 1852. Re-elected in 1854. Re-elected in 1856. Re-elected in 1858. Lost re-election.	1853–1863 [data missing]
William Eckart Lehman (Philadelphia)	Democratic	March 4, 1861 – March 3, 1863	37th	Elected in 1860. Lost re-election.	1853–1863 [data missing]
Samuel J. Randall (Philadelphia)	Democratic	March 4, 1863 – March 3, 1875	38th 39th 40th 41st 42nd 43rd	Elected in 1862. Re-elected in 1864. Re-elected in 1866. Re-elected in 1868. Re-elected in 1870. Re-elected in 1872. Redistricted to the 3rd district.	1863–1873 [data missing]
Samuel J. Randall (Philadelphia)	Democratic	March 4, 1863 – March 3, 1875	38th 39th 40th 41st 42nd 43rd	Elected in 1862. Re-elected in 1864. Re-elected in 1866. Re-elected in 1868. Re-elected in 1870. Re-elected in 1872. Redistricted to the 3rd district.	1873–1883 [data missing]
Chapman Freeman (Philadelphia)	Republican	March 4, 1875 – March 3, 1879	44th 45th	Elected in 1874. Re-elected in 1876. Retired.	1873–1883 [data missing]
Henry H. Bingham (Philadelphia)	Republican	March 4, 1879 – March 22, 1912	46th 47th 48th 49th 50th 51st 52nd 53rd 54th 55th 56th 57th 58th 59th 60th 61st 62nd	Elected in 1878. Re-elected in 1880. Re-elected in 1882. Re-elected in 1884. Re-elected in 1886. Re-elected in 1888. Re-elected in 1890. Re-elected in 1892. Re-elected in 1894. Re-elected in 1896. Re-elected in 1898. Re-elected in 1900. Re-elected in 1902. Re-elected in 1904. Re-elected in 1906. Re-elected in 1908. Re-elected in 1910. Died.	1873–1883 [data missing]
Henry H. Bingham (Philadelphia)	Republican	March 4, 1879 – March 22, 1912	46th 47th 48th 49th 50th 51st 52nd 53rd 54th 55th 56th 57th 58th 59th 60th 61st 62nd	Elected in 1878. Re-elected in 1880. Re-elected in 1882. Re-elected in 1884. Re-elected in 1886. Re-elected in 1888. Re-elected in 1890. Re-elected in 1892. Re-elected in 1894. Re-elected in 1896. Re-elected in 1898. Re-elected in 1900. Re-elected in 1902. Re-elected in 1904. Re-elected in 1906. Re-elected in 1908. Re-elected in 1910. Died.	1883–1893 [data missing]
Henry H. Bingham (Philadelphia)	Republican	March 4, 1879 – March 22, 1912	46th 47th 48th 49th 50th 51st 52nd 53rd 54th 55th 56th 57th 58th 59th 60th 61st 62nd	Elected in 1878. Re-elected in 1880. Re-elected in 1882. Re-elected in 1884. Re-elected in 1886. Re-elected in 1888. Re-elected in 1890. Re-elected in 1892. Re-elected in 1894. Re-elected in 1896. Re-elected in 1898. Re-elected in 1900. Re-elected in 1902. Re-elected in 1904. Re-elected in 1906. Re-elected in 1908. Re-elected in 1910. Died.	1893–1903 [data missing]
Henry H. Bingham (Philadelphia)	Republican	March 4, 1879 – March 22, 1912	46th 47th 48th 49th 50th 51st 52nd 53rd 54th 55th 56th 57th 58th 59th 60th 61st 62nd	Elected in 1878. Re-elected in 1880. Re-elected in 1882. Re-elected in 1884. Re-elected in 1886. Re-elected in 1888. Re-elected in 1890. Re-elected in 1892. Re-elected in 1894. Re-elected in 1896. Re-elected in 1898. Re-elected in 1900. Re-elected in 1902. Re-elected in 1904. Re-elected in 1906. Re-elected in 1908. Re-elected in 1910. Died.	1903–1913 [data missing]
Vacant		March 22, 1912 – May 24, 1912	62nd		1903–1913 [data missing]
William S. Vare (Philadelphia)	Republican	May 24, 1912 – March 3, 1927	62nd 63rd 64th 65th 66th 67th 68th 69th	Elected to finish Bingham's term. Re-elected in 1912. Re-elected in 1914. Re-elected in 1916. Re-elected in 1918. Re-elected in 1920. Re-elected in 1922. Re-elected in 1924. Retired to run for U.S. Senator.	1903–1913 [data missing]
William S. Vare (Philadelphia)	Republican	May 24, 1912 – March 3, 1927	62nd 63rd 64th 65th 66th 67th 68th 69th	Elected to finish Bingham's term. Re-elected in 1912. Re-elected in 1914. Re-elected in 1916. Re-elected in 1918. Re-elected in 1920. Re-elected in 1922. Re-elected in 1924. Retired to run for U.S. Senator.	1913–1933 [data missing]
James M. Hazlett (Philadelphia)	Republican	March 4, 1927 – October 20, 1927	70th	Elected in 1926. Resigned.	1913–1933 [data missing]
Vacant		October 20, 1927 – November 8, 1927	70th		1913–1933 [data missing]
James M. Beck (Philadelphia)	Republican	November 8, 1927 – March 3, 1933	70th 71st 72nd	Elected to finish Hazlett's term. Re-elected in 1928. Re-elected in 1930. Redistricted to the 2nd district.	1913–1933 [data missing]
Harry C. Ransley (Philadelphia)	Republican	March 4, 1933 – January 3, 1937	73rd 74th	Elected in 1932. Re-elected in 1934. Lost re-election.	1933–1943 [data missing]
Leon Sacks (Philadelphia)	Democratic	January 3, 1937 – January 3, 1943	75th 76th 77th	Elected in 1936. Re-elected in 1938. Re-elected in 1940. Lost re-election.	1933–1943 [data missing]
James A. Gallagher (Philadelphia)	Republican	January 3, 1943 – January 3, 1945	78th	Elected in 1942. Lost re-election.	1943–1953 [data missing]
William A. Barrett (Philadelphia)	Democratic	January 3, 1945 – January 3, 1947	79th	Elected in 1944. Lost re-election.	1943–1953 [data missing]
James A. Gallagher (Philadelphia)	Republican	January 3, 1947 – January 3, 1949	80th	Elected in 1946. Lost re-election.	1943–1953 [data missing]
William A. Barrett (Philadelphia)	Democratic	January 3, 1949 – April 12, 1976	81st 82nd 83rd 84th 85th 86th 87th 88th 89th 90th 91st 92nd 93rd 94th	Elected in 1948. Re-elected in 1950. Re-elected in 1952. Re-elected in 1954. Re-elected in 1956. Re-elected in 1958. Re-elected in 1960. Re-elected in 1962. Re-elected in 1964. Re-elected in 1966. Re-elected in 1968. Re-elected in 1970. Re-elected in 1972. Re-elected in 1974. Died.	1943–1953 [data missing]
William A. Barrett (Philadelphia)	Democratic	January 3, 1949 – April 12, 1976	81st 82nd 83rd 84th 85th 86th 87th 88th 89th 90th 91st 92nd 93rd 94th	Elected in 1948. Re-elected in 1950. Re-elected in 1952. Re-elected in 1954. Re-elected in 1956. Re-elected in 1958. Re-elected in 1960. Re-elected in 1962. Re-elected in 1964. Re-elected in 1966. Re-elected in 1968. Re-elected in 1970. Re-elected in 1972. Re-elected in 1974. Died.	1953–1963 [data missing]
William A. Barrett (Philadelphia)	Democratic	January 3, 1949 – April 12, 1976	81st 82nd 83rd 84th 85th 86th 87th 88th 89th 90th 91st 92nd 93rd 94th	Elected in 1948. Re-elected in 1950. Re-elected in 1952. Re-elected in 1954. Re-elected in 1956. Re-elected in 1958. Re-elected in 1960. Re-elected in 1962. Re-elected in 1964. Re-elected in 1966. Re-elected in 1968. Re-elected in 1970. Re-elected in 1972. Re-elected in 1974. Died.	1963–1973 [data missing]
William A. Barrett (Philadelphia)	Democratic	January 3, 1949 – April 12, 1976	81st 82nd 83rd 84th 85th 86th 87th 88th 89th 90th 91st 92nd 93rd 94th	Elected in 1948. Re-elected in 1950. Re-elected in 1952. Re-elected in 1954. Re-elected in 1956. Re-elected in 1958. Re-elected in 1960. Re-elected in 1962. Re-elected in 1964. Re-elected in 1966. Re-elected in 1968. Re-elected in 1970. Re-elected in 1972. Re-elected in 1974. Died.	1973–1983 [data missing]
Vacant		April 12, 1976 – November 2, 1976	94th		1973–1983 [data missing]
Michael Myers (Philadelphia)	Democratic	November 2, 1976 – October 2, 1980	94th 95th 96th	Elected to finish Barrett's term. Re-elected in 1976. Re-elected in 1978. Expelled.	1973–1983 [data missing]
Vacant		October 2, 1980 – January 3, 1981	96th		1973–1983 [data missing]
Tom Foglietta (Philadelphia)	Democratic	January 3, 1981 – November 11, 1997	97th 98th 99th 100th 101st 102nd 103rd 104th 105th	Elected in 1980. Re-elected in 1982. Re-elected in 1984. Re-elected in 1986. Re-elected in 1988. Re-elected in 1990. Re-elected in 1992. Re-elected in 1994. Re-elected in 1996. Resigned to become U.S. Ambassador to Italy.	1973–1983 [data missing]
Tom Foglietta (Philadelphia)	Democratic	January 3, 1981 – November 11, 1997	97th 98th 99th 100th 101st 102nd 103rd 104th 105th	Elected in 1980. Re-elected in 1982. Re-elected in 1984. Re-elected in 1986. Re-elected in 1988. Re-elected in 1990. Re-elected in 1992. Re-elected in 1994. Re-elected in 1996. Resigned to become U.S. Ambassador to Italy.	1983–1993 [data missing]
Tom Foglietta (Philadelphia)	Democratic	January 3, 1981 – November 11, 1997	97th 98th 99th 100th 101st 102nd 103rd 104th 105th	Elected in 1980. Re-elected in 1982. Re-elected in 1984. Re-elected in 1986. Re-elected in 1988. Re-elected in 1990. Re-elected in 1992. Re-elected in 1994. Re-elected in 1996. Resigned to become U.S. Ambassador to Italy.	1993–2003 [data missing]
Vacant		November 11, 1997 – May 19, 1998	105th		1993–2003 [data missing]
Bob Brady (Philadelphia)	Democratic	May 19, 1998 – January 3, 2019	105th 106th 107th 108th 109th 110th 111th 112th 113th 114th 115th	Elected to finish Foglietta's term. Re-elected in 1998. Re-elected in 2000. Re-elected in 2002. Re-elected in 2004. Re-elected in 2006. Re-elected in 2008. Re-elected in 2010. Re-elected in 2012. Re-elected in 2014. Re-elected in 2016. Redistricted to the 3rd district and retired.	1993–2003 [data missing]
Bob Brady (Philadelphia)	Democratic	May 19, 1998 – January 3, 2019	105th 106th 107th 108th 109th 110th 111th 112th 113th 114th 115th	Elected to finish Foglietta's term. Re-elected in 1998. Re-elected in 2000. Re-elected in 2002. Re-elected in 2004. Re-elected in 2006. Re-elected in 2008. Re-elected in 2010. Re-elected in 2012. Re-elected in 2014. Re-elected in 2016. Redistricted to the 3rd district and retired.	2003–2013
Bob Brady (Philadelphia)	Democratic	May 19, 1998 – January 3, 2019	105th 106th 107th 108th 109th 110th 111th 112th 113th 114th 115th	Elected to finish Foglietta's term. Re-elected in 1998. Re-elected in 2000. Re-elected in 2002. Re-elected in 2004. Re-elected in 2006. Re-elected in 2008. Re-elected in 2010. Re-elected in 2012. Re-elected in 2014. Re-elected in 2016. Redistricted to the 3rd district and retired.	2013–2019
Brian Fitzpatrick (Levittown)	Republican	January 3, 2019 – present	116th 117th 118th 119th	Redistricted from the 8th district and re-elected in 2018. Re-elected in 2020. Re-elected in 2022. Re-elected in 2024. Lost re-election.	2019-2023
Brian Fitzpatrick (Levittown)	Republican	January 3, 2019 – present	116th 117th 118th 119th	Redistricted from the 8th district and re-elected in 2018. Re-elected in 2020. Re-elected in 2022. Re-elected in 2024. Lost re-election.	2023–
Bob Harvie (Levittown)	Democratic	Assuming office on January 3, 2027		Elected in 2026.	2023–

== Recent election results ==
=== 2012 ===
Pennsylvania's 1st congressional district, 2012
Party	Candidate	Votes	%
Democratic	Bob Brady (incumbent)	235,394	85.0
Republican	John Featherman	41,708	15.0
Total votes		277,102	100.0
Democratic hold			

=== 2014 ===
Pennsylvania's 1st congressional district, 2014
Party	Candidate	Votes	%
Democratic	Bob Brady (incumbent)	131,248	82.8
Republican	Megan Rath	27,193	17.2
Total votes		158,441	100.0
Democratic hold			

=== 2016 ===
Pennsylvania's 1st congressional district, 2016
Party	Candidate	Votes	%
Democratic	Bob Brady (incumbent)	245,791	82.2
Republican	Debbie Williams	53,219	17.8
Total votes		299,010	100.0
Democratic hold			

=== 2018 ===
Pennsylvania's 1st congressional district, 2018
Party	Candidate	Votes	%
Republican	Brian Fitzpatrick (incumbent)	169,053	51.3
Democratic	Scott Wallace	160,745	48.7
Total votes		329,798	100.0
Republican hold			

=== 2020 ===
Pennsylvania's 1st congressional district, 2020
Party	Candidate	Votes	%
Republican	Brian Fitzpatrick (incumbent)	249,804	56.6
Democratic	Christina Finello	191,875	43.4
Total votes		441,679	100.0
Republican hold			

=== 2022 ===
Pennsylvania's 1st congressional district, 2022
Party	Candidate	Votes	%
Republican	Brian Fitzpatrick (incumbent)	201,571	54.9
Democratic	Ashley Ehasz	165,809	45.1
Total votes		367,380	100.0
Republican hold			

=== 2024 ===
Pennsylvania's 1st congressional district, 2024
Party	Candidate	Votes	%
Republican	Brian Fitzpatrick (incumbent)	261,390	56.40
Democratic	Ashley Ehasz	202,042	43.60
Total votes		463,432	100.00
Republican hold			

== See also ==
- List of United States congressional districts
- Pennsylvania's congressional districts
