= Thomas Kittera =

American politician (1789-1839)

Member of the U.S. House of Representatives from Pennsylvania's 2nd district
- In office October 10, 1826 – March 3, 1827
- Preceded by: Joseph Hemphill
- Succeeded by: John Sergeant

Personal details
- Born: March 21, 1789 Lancaster, Pennsylvania, U.S.
- Died: June 16, 1839 (aged 50) Philadelphia, Pennsylvania, U.S.
- Resting place: Mount Moriah Cemetery, Philadelphia, Pennsylvania, U.S.
- Party: National Republican
- Parent: John Kittera
- Education: University of Pennsylvania

Thomas Kittera (March 21, 1789 – June 16, 1839) was an American politician who served as a National Republican member of the United States House of Representatives for Pennsylvania's 2nd congressional district from 1826 to 1827.

== Early life and education ==
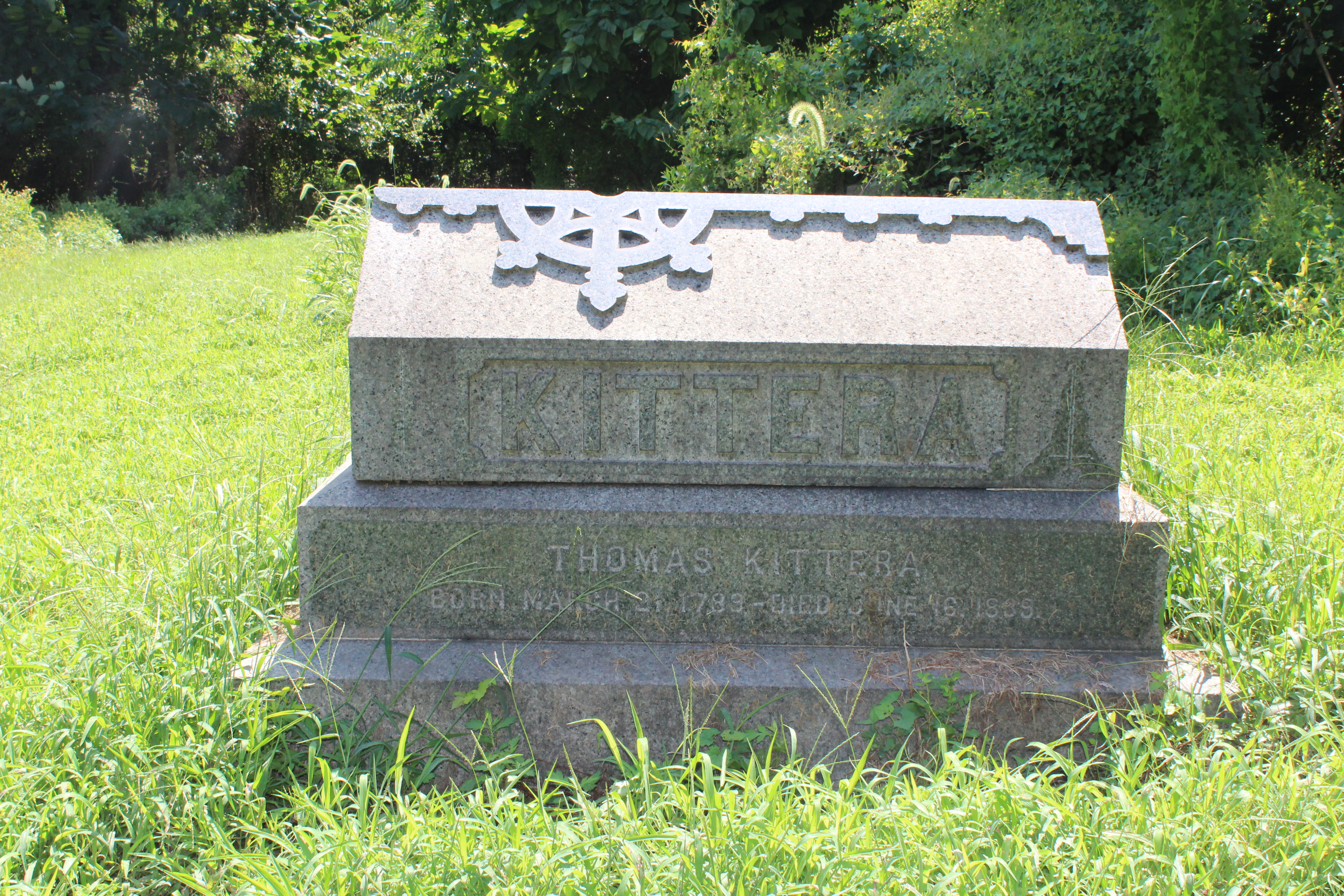
Thomas Kittera grave at Mount Moriah Cemetery

Kittera was born in Lancaster, Pennsylvania on March 21, 1789. He moved to Philadelphia in 1801 with his father, John Wilkes Kittera. He graduated from the University of Pennsylvania at Philadelphia in 1805. He studied law, was admitted to the bar in 1808 and commenced practice in Philadelphia.

== Career ==
He served as deputy attorney general of Pennsylvania from 1817 to 1818 and deputy attorney general of Philadelphia from 1824 to 1826. He was a member of the select council and its president from 1824 to 1825.

Kittera was elected as an National Republican Party candidate to the Nineteenth Congress to fill the vacancy caused by the resignation of Joseph Hemphill. He was an unsuccessful candidate for election to the Twentieth Congress.

Kittera was a senior member of the Masonic Order and served as Right Worshipful Grand Master of the Grand Lodge of Pennsylvania from 1826 to 1828.

He died in Philadelphia on June 16, 1839. He was interred in St. Paul’s Protestant Episcopal Church Cemetery and reinterred to Mount Moriah Cemetery in 1870.

== Legacy ==
A portrait of Kittera painted by Thomas Sully, is displayed at the Masonic Temple in Philadelphia. Thomas is the father-in-law of Philadelphia mayor, Robert Taylor Conrad.

U.S. House of Representatives
Preceded by Joseph Hemphill	Member of the U.S. House of Representatives from Pennsylvania's 2nd congressional district October 10, 1826 - March 3, 1827	Succeeded by John Sergeant
