= Charles Jared Ingersoll =

American politician and writer

Charles J. Ingersoll
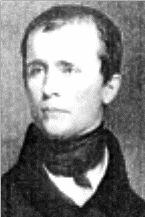

Member of the U.S. House of Representatives from Pennsylvania's 4th district
- In office March 4, 1843 – March 3, 1849
- Preceded by: Jeremiah Brown; Francis James; John Edwards
- Succeeded by: John Robbins

Member of the U.S. House of Representatives from Pennsylvania's 3rd district
- In office March 4, 1841 – March 3, 1843
- Preceded by: Charles Naylor
- Succeeded by: John T. Smith

Chair of the House Judiciary Committee
- In office March 4, 1813 – March 3, 1815
- Preceded by: Position established
- Succeeded by: Hugh Nelson

Member of the U.S. House of Representatives from Pennsylvania's 1st district
- In office March 4, 1813 – March 3, 1815
- Preceded by: Adam Seybert; James Milnor; William Anderson
- Succeeded by: Joseph Hopkinson; William Milnor; Thomas Smith; Jonathan Williams

Member of the Pennsylvania House of Representatives
- In office 1830

Personal details
- Born: October 3, 1782 Philadelphia, Pennsylvania, US
- Died: May 14, 1862 (aged 79) Philadelphia, Pennsylvania, US
- Party: Democratic-Republican; Democratic

Charles Jared Ingersoll (October 3, 1782 – May 14, 1862) was an American lawyer, writer and politician who served as a Democratic member of the U.S. House of Representatives for Pennsylvania's 1st congressional district from 1813 to 1815, Pennsylvania's 3rd congressional district from 1841 to 1843 and Pennsylvania's 4th congressional district from 1843 to 1849. He served as a member of the Pennsylvania House of Representatives in 1830.

== Early life and education ==
Ingersoll was born in Philadelphia, Pennsylvania to Jared Ingersoll and Elizabeth Petit. His father served in the Continental Congress and his brother of Joseph Reed Ingersoll served as a member of the U.S. House of Representative for Pennsylvania. His maternal grandfather, Charles Pettit, served as a delegate for Pennsylvania to the Confederation Congress.

Charles Ingersoll dropped out of the College of New Jersey, later Princeton University, in 1799. He then studied law, was admitted to the bar in 1802 and commenced practice in Philadelphia. He traveled in Europe, accompanied by Rufus King, the United States minister to the United Kingdom.

== Congress ==
In 1812, Ingersoll was elected as a Democratic-Republican to the Thirteenth Congress, where he served as chairman of the United States House Committee on the Judiciary. He was not a candidate for renomination in 1814, having been appointed United States district attorney for Pennsylvania. He served in that office from 1815 to 1829, and was a member of the Pennsylvania canal and internal improvement convention in 1825. In 1829, he was removed from the office of district attorney by U.S. President Andrew Jackson.

In 1815, Ingersoll was elected a member of the American Philosophical Society.

He was a member of the Pennsylvania House of Representatives in 1830, and a member of the State constitutional convention in 1837. He was appointed secretary of the legation to Prussia on March 8, 1837. He was an unsuccessful candidate in 1837 for election to fill the vacancy caused by the death of Francis J. Harper in the Twenty-fifth Congress. He was again an unsuccessful candidate for election in 1838.

Ingersoll was elected as a Democrat to the Twenty-seventh and to the three succeeding Congresses. He served as chairman of the United States House Committee on Foreign Affairs during the Twenty-eighth and Twenty-ninth Congresses).

He was not a candidate for renomination in 1848.

=== Later career ===
He was appointed Minister to France in 1847 but was not confirmed by the Senate.

Beginning in 1845 Ingersoll wrote several editions of a history of the War of 1812, including descriptions of the Congressional investigation of the Burning of Washington in 1814.

=== Death ===
He died in Philadelphia on May 14, 1862.

== Personal life ==
In 1804, Ingersoll married Mary Wilcocks, the daughter of Alexander Wilcocks, and together had six surviving sons and 2 daughters. His son Edward Ingersoll wrote on legal topics.

== Bibliography ==
- “Chiomara,” a poem published in The Port Folio (1800)
- Edwy and Elgira, a tragedy (Philadelphia, 1801)
- Right and Wrongs, Power and Policy of the United States of America (1808)
- Inchiquin the Jesuit's Letters on American Literature and Politics (New York, 1810)
- "Discourse Concerning the Influence of America on the Mind" being Annual Oration before the American Philosophical Society (1823)
- “Julian,” a dramatic poem (1831)
- Historical Sketch of the Second War between the United States and Great Britain (4 vols., Philadelphia, 1845-'52).
- Recollections, Historical, Political, Biographical, and Social, of Charles J. Ingersoll. (Philadelphia: Lippincott & Co., 1861)

He also published numerous anonymous contributions to the Democratic Press of Philadelphia, and to the National Intelligencer of Washington, on the controversies with England before the War of 1812 (1811–15). He published several “Speeches” concerning that war (1813–15), a discourse before the American Philosophical Society on the “Influence of America on the Mind,” which was republished in England and France (1823), a translation of a French work on the freedom of navigation, in the American Law Journal of 1829, and many other literary and political discourses. At the time of his death, he was preparing a History of the Territorial Acquisitions of the United States.

== Sources ==
- United States Congress. "Charles Jared Ingersoll (id: I000015)". Biographical Directory of the United States Congress.
- The Political Graveyard

Attribution

U.S. House of Representatives
Preceded by Adam Seybert, James Milnor, William Anderson	Member of the U.S. House of Representatives from Pennsylvania's 1st congressional district 1813–1815 alongside John Conrad and Adam Seybert	Succeeded by Joseph Hopkinson, William Milnor, Thomas Smith, Jonathan Williams
Preceded by Charles Naylor	Member of the U.S. House of Representatives from Pennsylvania's 3rd congressional district 1841–1843	Succeeded by John T. Smith
Preceded by Jeremiah Brown; Francis James; John Edwards	Member of the U.S. House of Representatives from Pennsylvania's 4th congressional district 1843–1849	Succeeded by John Robbins
