= James Milnor =

American politician

James Milnor (June 20, 1773 Philadelphia – April 8, 1845 Manhattan, New York) was a member of the U.S. House of Representatives from Pennsylvania for two years (1811–1813), a lawyer for 16 years (1794 to 1810), and an Episcopal priest for 29 1/2 years (from mid-1814 to 1845) and was rector of St. George's Episcopal Church (Manhattan) in New York City.

== Education and career ==
Milnor attended public grammar school in Philadelphia and the University of Pennsylvania at Philadelphia, but initially did not graduate. He studied law, was admitted to the bar in 1794 and commenced practice in Norristown, Pennsylvania. He moved to Philadelphia in 1797 and continued the practice of his profession. He was a member of the Philadelphia Common Council in 1800, a member of the Select Council from 1805 to 1810 and served as president in 1808 and 1809. On July 29, 1819, the University of Pennsylvania conferred on Milnor the degree of Doctor of Divinity. Milnor had begun studying divinity with Bishop William White while in Washington, D.C.

In October 1810, Milnor, a Federalist, was elected to represent the First Congressional District of Pennsylvania, in the Twelfth Congress. After his time in Congress, he studied theology and was ordained as a minister of the Protestant Episcopal Church. In 1814 he was appointed assistant minister of St. Peter's Church in Philadelphia and in 1816, he was elected rector of St. George's Episcopal Church (Manhattan) in New York City, a capacity he served in until his death in New York City in 1845. Among his parishioners was Mary Simpson, an African-American grocer who lived on John Street. Milnor was interred in Greenwood Cemetery, Brooklyn, New York.

== Affiliations ==
In 1798, Milnor had been an officer of Pennsylvania Society, which at the time, was waging a movement to abolish slavery.

Milnor was a freemason and served as grand master of the Grand Lodge of Pennsylvania from 1806 to 1813.

In 1829 he began his tenure as President of the New York Institution for the Deaf.

== Family ==
James Milnor, son of William Milnor Sr and Anna Breintnall of Philadelphia, was married, on 28 February 1799, to Eleanor Pawling, daughter of Henry Pawling and Rebecca Bull. James Milnor was the brother of William Milnor Jr, also a former member of the U.S. House of Representatives from Pennsylvania and mayor of Philadelphia.

U.S. House of Representatives
Preceded by Adam Seybert; William Anderson; John Porter	Member of the U.S. House of Representatives from Pennsylvania's 1st congressional district 1811–1813 alongside: Adam Seybert and William Anderson	Succeeded by Adam Seybert; William Anderson; John Conard; Charles J. Ingersoll
