= Joshua Lippincott =

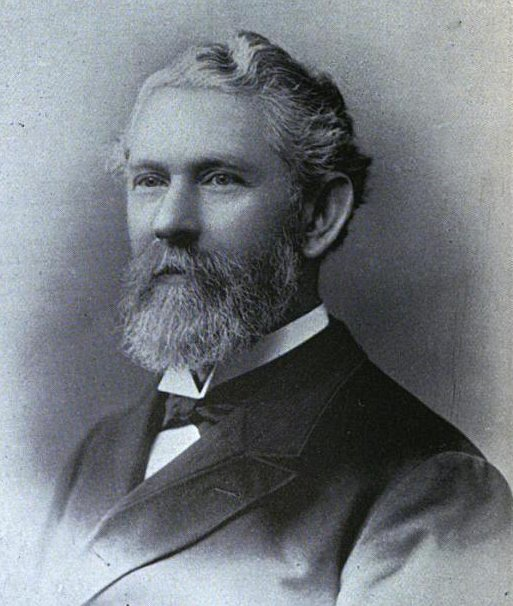
Joshua Lippincott

Joshua Allan Lippincott (January 31, 1835 – December 30, 1906) was the fourth Chancellor of the University of Kansas from 1883 to 1889.

Lippincott was born in Burlington County, New Jersey. In 1853 he began studies at Pennington Seminary and later attended Dickinson College. He then taught at Pennington. He later became the superintendent of the Scranton Public Schools. In 1865 he became a member of the Methodis Episcopal Church. In 1866 Lippincott joined the faculty of the New Jersey State Normal School in Trenton, New Jersey. He later was a pastor for the Methodist Church in Hackensack, New Jersey. In 1874 he became a professor of math and astronomy at Dickinson College where he remained until taking the Chancellorship of the University of Kansas in 1883.

Lippincott resigned the Chancellorship in 1889 and for the rest of his life worked as a Methodist clergyman first in Topeka and later in Pennsylvania.
