= Daniel H. Miller =

American politician

Member of the U.S. House of Representatives from Pennsylvania's 3rd district
- In office March 4, 1823 – March 3, 1831
- Preceded by: James Buchanan; John Phillips
- Succeeded by: John Goddard Watmough

Personal details
- Born: Philadelphia, Pennsylvania, U.S.
- Died: 1846 Philadelphia, Pennsylvania, U.S.
- Party: Jacksonian
- Other political affiliations: Democratic-Republican
- Profession: Politician

Daniel H. Miller was an American politician who served in the United States House of Representatives from 1823 to 1831, representing the 3rd congressional district of Pennsylvania as both a Democratic-Republican and a Jacksonian.

== Early life ==
Miller was born in Philadelphia, Pennsylvania.

== Career ==
Miller was elected as a Democratic-Republican to the 18th United States Congress. He was elected to the three subsequent Congresses as a Jacksonian.

Miller's time in office began on March 4, 1823 and concluded on March 3, 1831. He represented the 3rd congressional district of Pennsylvania from the 18th United States Congress to the 21st United States Congress.

== Death ==
Miller died in Philadelphia in 1846.

U.S. House of Representatives
Preceded by James Buchanan; John Phillips	Member of the U.S. House of Representatives from Pennsylvania's 3rd congressional district 1823–1831	Succeeded by John Goddard Watmough
