= Jonathan Williams (engineer) =

American military officer (1750-1815)

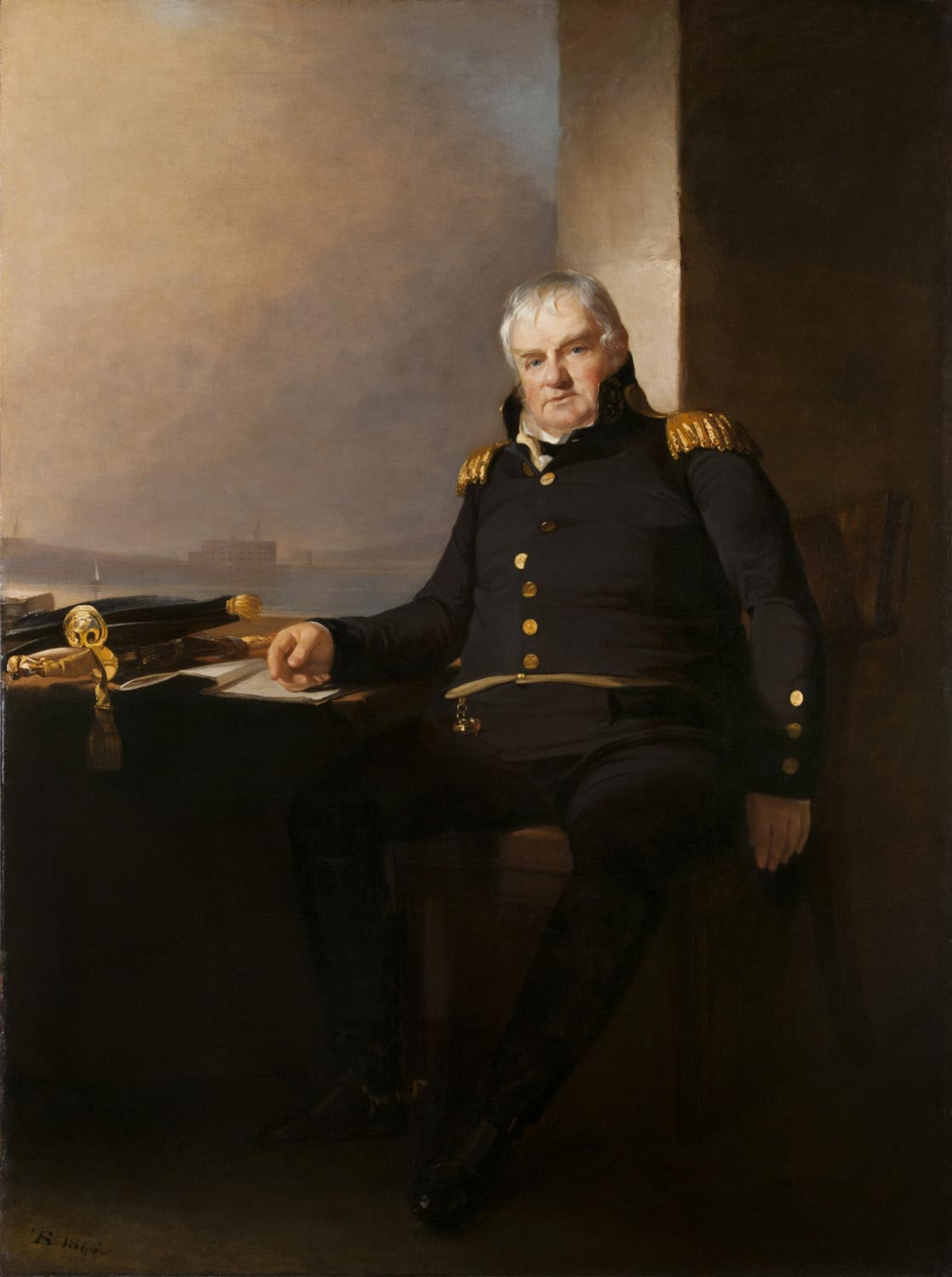
- Portrait by Thomas Sully, 1815.

Member of the U.S. House of Representatives from Pennsylvania's 1st district
- In office March 4, 1815 – May 16, 1815

Superintendent of the United States Military Academy
- In office 1801–1812
- Preceded by: position established
- Succeeded by: Joseph Gardner Swift

Personal details
- Born: May 20, 1750 Boston, Province of Massachusetts Bay
- Died: May 16, 1815 (aged 64) Philadelphia, Pennsylvania, U.S.
- Resting place: Laurel Hill Cemetery, Philadelphia, Pennsylvania, U.S.
- Education: Harvard University (AM)

Military service
- Allegiance: United States
- Branch/service: United States Army
- Years of service: 1801 - 1812
- Rank: Colonel
- Unit: Corps of Engineers
- Commands: Chief of Engineers; Superintendent of the United States Military Academy

Jonathan Williams (May 20, 1750 – May 16, 1815) was an American military officer, engineer, and politician. He served as the first superintendent of the United States Military Academy from 1801 to 1803 and from 1805 to 1812. He served as chief of engineers of the United States Army Corps of Engineers from 1802 to 1803 and from 1805 to 1812. He led the construction of fortifications in New York Harbor from 1807 to 1811, including Castle Williams, the first casemated battery in the United States. He served as a member of the United States House of Representatives for Pennsylvania in 1815 but died before the 14th United States Congress assembled.

== Early life and education ==
Williams was born in Boston on May 20, 1750. He was a grandnephew of Benjamin Franklin. He graduated from Harvard in 1787 with an A.M. degree and worked at a bank in Boston.

== Career ==
He served as personal secretary to Benjamin Franklin in London and Paris from 1770 to 1783.

In 1785, he returned to the United States. He lived in Philadelphia and served as a judge of the Pennsylvania courts of common pleas. He joined the American Philosophical Society in 1787 and served as secretary.

President John Adams appointed Williams a major in the Corps of Artillerists and Engineers in February 1801. President Thomas Jefferson upon approval made him the Army's Inspector of Fortifications and assigned him to serve as the first superintendent of West Point in December 1801. The following year Jefferson also appointed him to concurrently command the separate Corps of Engineers established by the Military Peace Establishment Act and Congress and signed by Jefferson on March 16, 1802. He vacated (not resigned) his Superintendent position in 1803 but was reappointed in 1805.

He led the construction of fortifications of New York Harbor. From 1807 to 1811 Williams designed and completed construction of Castle Williams (the East Battery) and Castle Clinton (the West Battery). Castle Williams was the first casemated battery in the United States. His fortifications proved effective and deterred the British Navy during the War of 1812. He founded the U.S. Military Philosophical Society and gave it its motto, "Science in War is the Guarantee of Peace."

He resigned from the Army in July 1812 after Secretary of War, William Eustis, refused to give him command of Castle Williams. He served as brigadier general in the New York Militia and his position as Superintendent of the United States Military Academy was given to Colonel Joseph Gardner Swift. He eventually returned to Philadelphia and pursued scientific and literary efforts. He was elected to the Fourteenth United States Congress from that city in 1814.

He died in Philadelphia on May 16, 1815. He was originally buried in Pine Street Cemetery in Philadelphia and was re-interred to Laurel Hill Cemetery in 1862.

== Legacy ==
In 1802, the investor Richard Woodhull purchased 13 acres (53,000 m^{2}) in the Town of Bushwick and named the area Williamsburgh (later changed to Williamsburg), after Williams, who surveyed the land.

In 1810, Castle Williams on Governors Island was named in his honor.

Jonathan Williams Plaza, a public housing project in Williamsburg, Brooklyn, was named after him.

== Publications ==
- Memoir on the Use of the Thermometer in Navigation; Presented to the American Philosophical Society, Held at Philadelphia, for Promoting Useful Knowledge, Philadelphia: R. Aitken & Son, 1792

== See also ==
- List of members of the United States Congress who died in office (1790–1899)

Military offices
Preceded by none	Superintendent of the U.S. Military Academy; 1801–1803	Succeeded by Decius Wadsworth
Preceded by Decius Wadsworth	Superintendent of the U.S. Military Academy; 1805–1812	Succeeded by Joseph Gardner Swift
Preceded by Henry Burbeck	Chief of Engineers; 1802–1803; 1805–1812	Succeeded by Joseph Gardner Swift
U.S. House of Representatives
Preceded by John Conard	Member of the U.S. House of Representatives from Pennsylvania's 1st congressional district 1815	Succeeded by John Sergeant
