= Joseph Hopkinson =

American politician & judge (1770–1842)

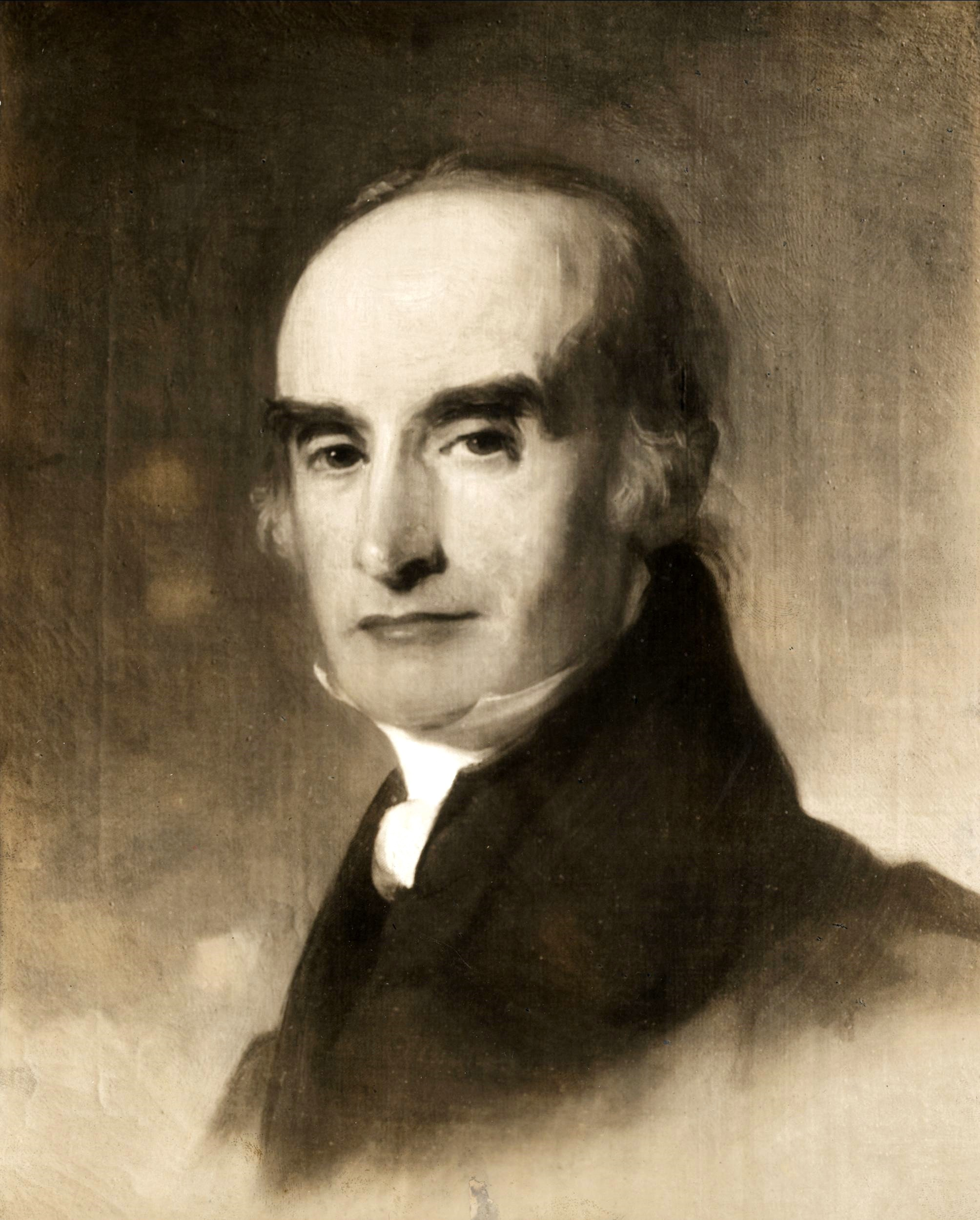

Judge of the United States District Court for the Eastern District of Pennsylvania
- In office October 23, 1828 – January 15, 1842
- Appointed by: John Quincy Adams
- Preceded by: Richard Peters
- Succeeded by: Archibald Randall

Member of the U.S. House of Representatives from Pennsylvania's 1st district
- In office March 4, 1815 – March 3, 1819
- Preceded by: Charles Jared Ingersoll
- Succeeded by: Samuel Edwards

Personal details
- Born: Joseph Hopkinson; November 12, 1770 Philadelphia, Province of Pennsylvania, British America
- Died: January 15, 1842 (aged 71) Philadelphia, Pennsylvania, U.S.
- Resting place: Christ Church Episcopal Cemetery; Bordentown, New Jersey
- Party: Federalist
- Relations: Thomas Mifflin
- Parent: Francis Hopkinson (father)
- Education: University of Pennsylvania (A.B., A.M.) read law

Joseph Hopkinson (November 12, 1770 – January 15, 1842) was a United States representative from Pennsylvania and a United States district judge of the United States District Court for the Eastern District of Pennsylvania.

== Education and career ==
Born on November 12, 1770, in Philadelphia, Province of Pennsylvania, British America, Hopkinson received an Artium Baccalaureus degree in 1786 from the University of Pennsylvania, an Artium Magister degree in 1789 from the same institution and read law in 1791, with William Rawle and James Wilson. He was admitted to the bar and entered private practice in Philadelphia and Easton, Pennsylvania from 1791 to 1814.

=== Notable cases ===
In 1795, Hopkinson defended the men charged with treason in their rebellion against a federal whiskey tax. In 1799, he successfully represented Dr. Benjamin Rush in a libel suit against journalist William Cobbett. He was counsel for Justice Samuel Chase in his impeachment trial before the United States Senate in 1804 and 1805.

== Congressional service ==
Hopkinson was elected as a Federalist from Pennsylvania's 1st congressional district to the United States House of Representatives of the 14th United States Congress. He was reelected to the succeeding Congress and served from March 4, 1815, to March 3, 1819. He was not a candidate for reelection in 1818.

== Later career ==
Following his departure from Congress, Hopkinson resumed private practice in Philadelphia from 1819 to 1820, in Bordentown, New Jersey from 1820 to 1823, and in Philadelphia from 1823 to 1828. He was a member of the New Jersey General Assembly from 1821 to 1822.

=== Notable cases ===
In 1819, Hopkinson argued several landmark constitutional cases before the United States Supreme Court, including Dartmouth College v. Woodward, Sturges v. Crowninshield and McCulloch v. Maryland. He was associated with Daniel Webster during the Dartmouth College case.

== Federal judicial service ==
Hopkinson received a recess appointment from President John Quincy Adams on October 23, 1828, to a seat on the United States District Court for the Eastern District of Pennsylvania vacated by Judge Richard Peters. He was nominated to the same position by President Adams on December 11, 1828. He was confirmed by the United States Senate on February 23, 1829, and received his commission the same day. His service terminated on January 15, 1842, due to his death in Philadelphia. He was interred in the old Borden-Hopkinson Burial Ground (now Christ Church Episcopal Cemetery) in Bordentown.

=== Notable case ===
Hopkinson's 1833 opinion in Wheaton v. Peters established the foundations of modern American copyright law.

== Other service and activities ==
Hopkinson was Chairman of the Pennsylvania constitutional convention in 1837. He was secretary of the board of trustees of the University of Pennsylvania in 1790 and 1791, and a trustee from 1806 to 1819, and from 1822 to 1842. His civic and cultural activities included service as President of the Pennsylvania Academy of the Fine Arts and as Vice-President of the American Philosophical Society (elected in 1815).

== First American edition of the Complete Works of Shakespeare ==
Hopkinson edited the first American edition of the Complete Works of Shakespeare, published in Philadelphia in 1795. It is also the first edition of Shakespeare's complete works to be published outside of the British Isles.

Hopkinson also penned the edition's preface and "The Life of the Author," marking the first instance of published American literary criticism of Shakespeare. In the preface, Hopkinson criticizes the British editorial treatment of Shakespeare, claiming that British editors (like Alexander Pope and Samuel Johnson) have "clogged [London editions] with...successive explanations" in pursuit of editorial preeminence. The public quarrels between British editors regarding their analyses, Hopkinson believed, stemmed from a desire for self-aggrandizement that detracted from Shakespeare's work itself. In protest, Hopkinson offers the American reader an edition of Shakespeare absent many of these so-called superfluous footnotes and encourages the American reader to engage with Shakespeare on their own terms.

== Composition ==
Hopkinson wrote the anthem Hail, Columbia in 1798.

== Family ==
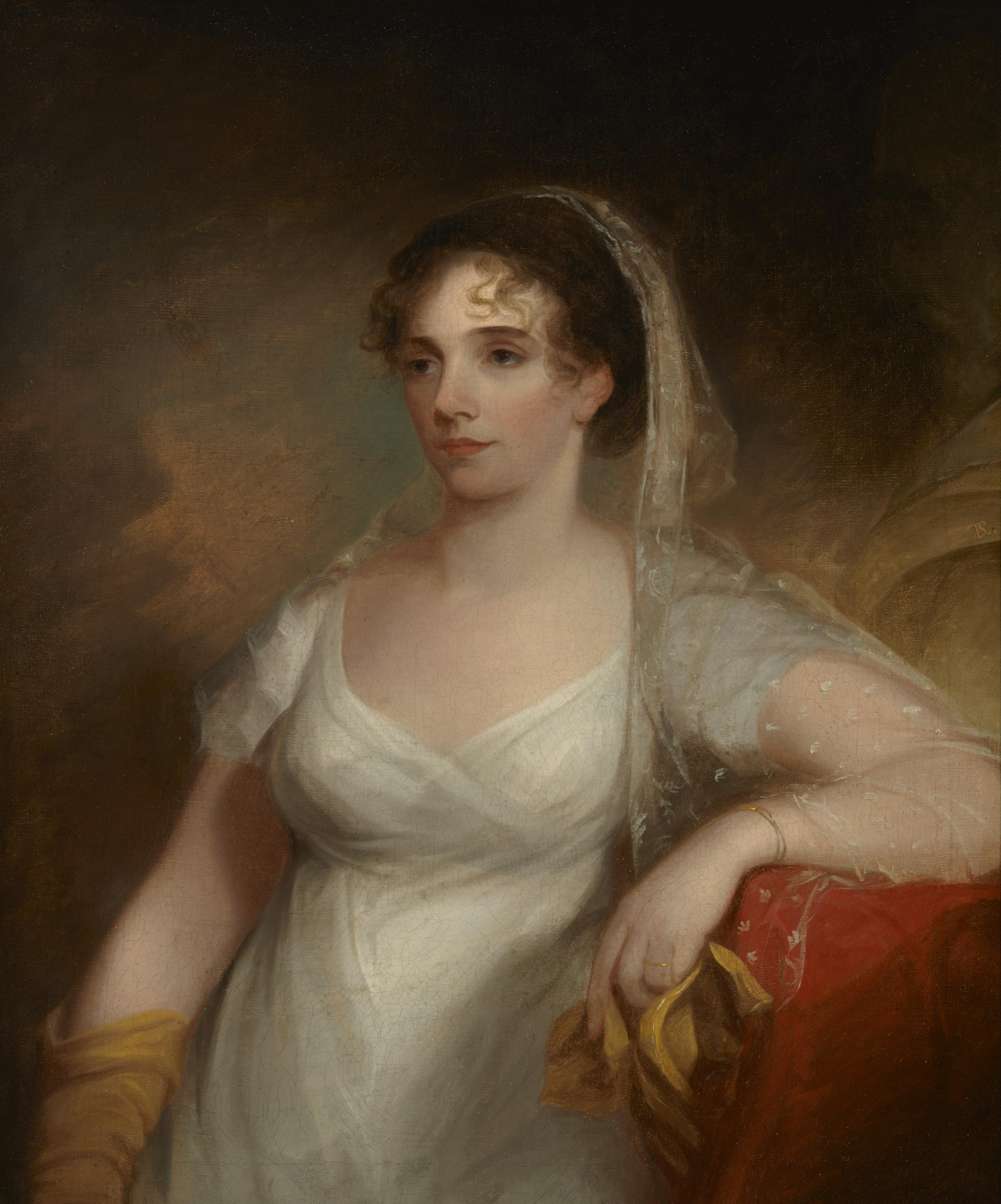
Emily Mifflin Hopkinson, portrait by Thomas Sully

Hopkinson was the son of Francis Hopkinson, a signer of the Declaration of Independence, a member of the Continental Congress and the first United States District Judge for Pennsylvania. In 1794, he married the daughter of Governor of Pennsylvania Thomas Mifflin.

== Bibliography ==
- Konkle, Burton Alva. Joseph Hopkinson, 1770-1842, Jurist-Scholar-Inspirer of the Arts: Author of Hail Columbia. Philadelphia: University of Pennsylvania Press, 1931.

== Sources ==
- United States Congress. "Joseph Hopkinson (id: H000784)". Biographical Directory of the United States Congress.
- Joseph Hopkinson at the Biographical Directory of Federal Judges, a publication of the Federal Judicial Center.
- The Political Graveyard
- Biography and portrait at the University of Pennsylvania

U.S. House of Representatives
Preceded by Charles Jared Ingersoll	Member of the U.S. House of Representatives from Pennsylvania's 1st congressional district 1815–1819	Succeeded by Samuel Edwards
Legal offices
Preceded by Richard Peters	Judge of the United States District Court for the Eastern District of Pennsylvania; 1829–1842	Succeeded by Archibald Randall
