= Federal impeachment trial in the United States =

Government proceeding to remove an officeholder

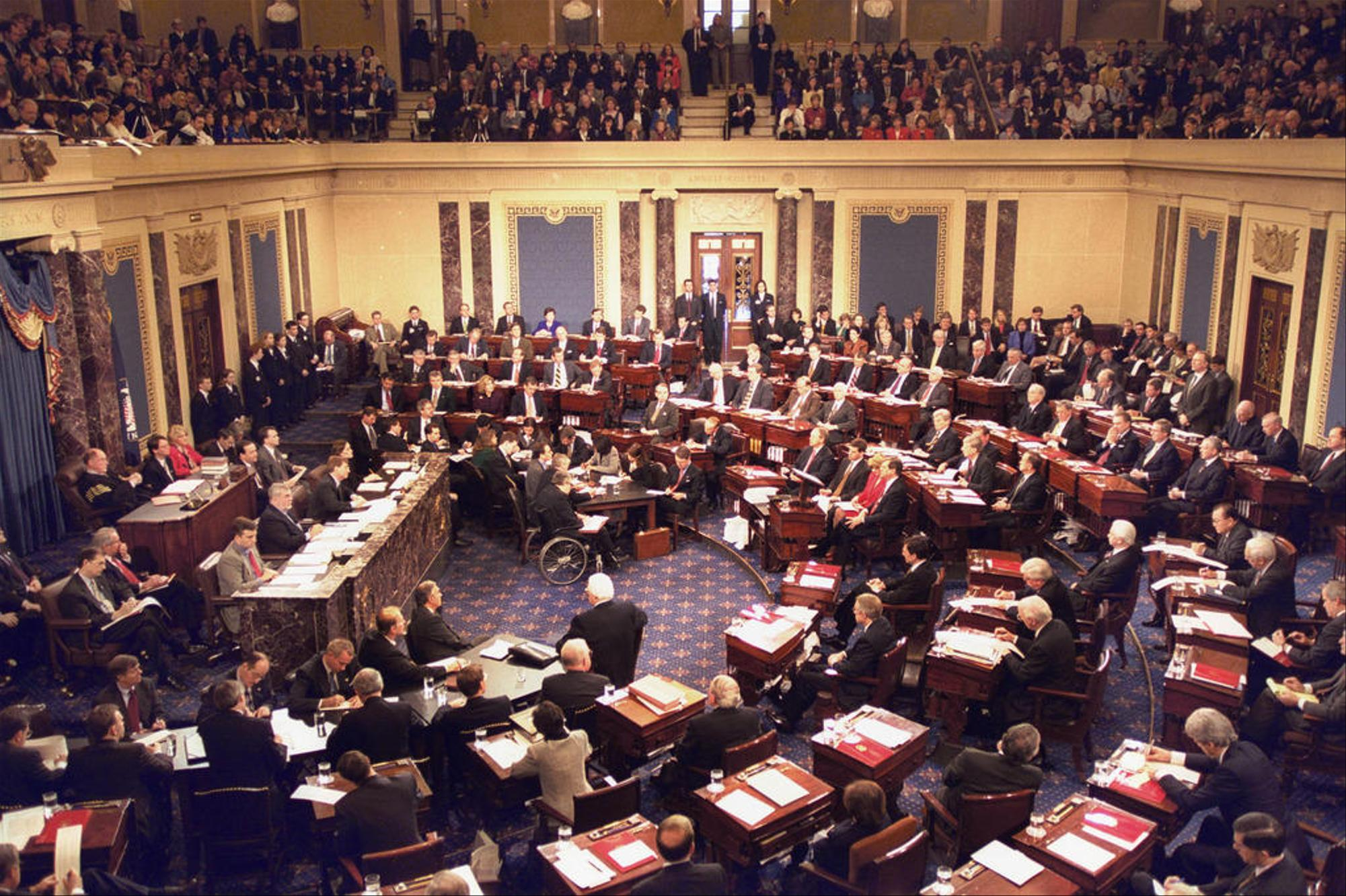
Photograph of the Senate during the 1999 impeachment trial of Bill Clinton

In the United States, a federal impeachment trial is held as the second stage of the U.S. federal government's two-stage impeachment process. The preceding stage is the "impeachment" itself, held by a vote in the United States House of Representatives. Federal impeachment trials are held in the U.S. Senate, with the senators acting as the jurors. At the end of a completed impeachment trial, the U.S. Senate delivers a verdict. A "guilty" verdict (requiring a two-thirds majority) has the effect of immediately removing an officeholder from office. After, and only after, a "guilty" verdict, the Senate has the option of additionally barring the official from ever holding federal office again, which can be done by a simple-majority vote.

== Officers and other key figures in an impeachment trial ==
=== Presiding officer ===
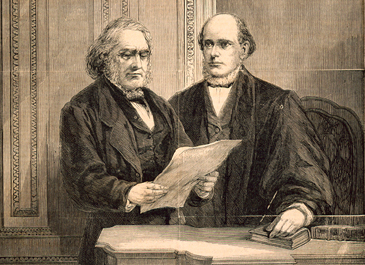
Associate Supreme Court Justice Samuel Nelson administering an oath to Salmon P. Chase for Chase's service as presiding officer of the 1868 impeachment trial of Andrew Johnson

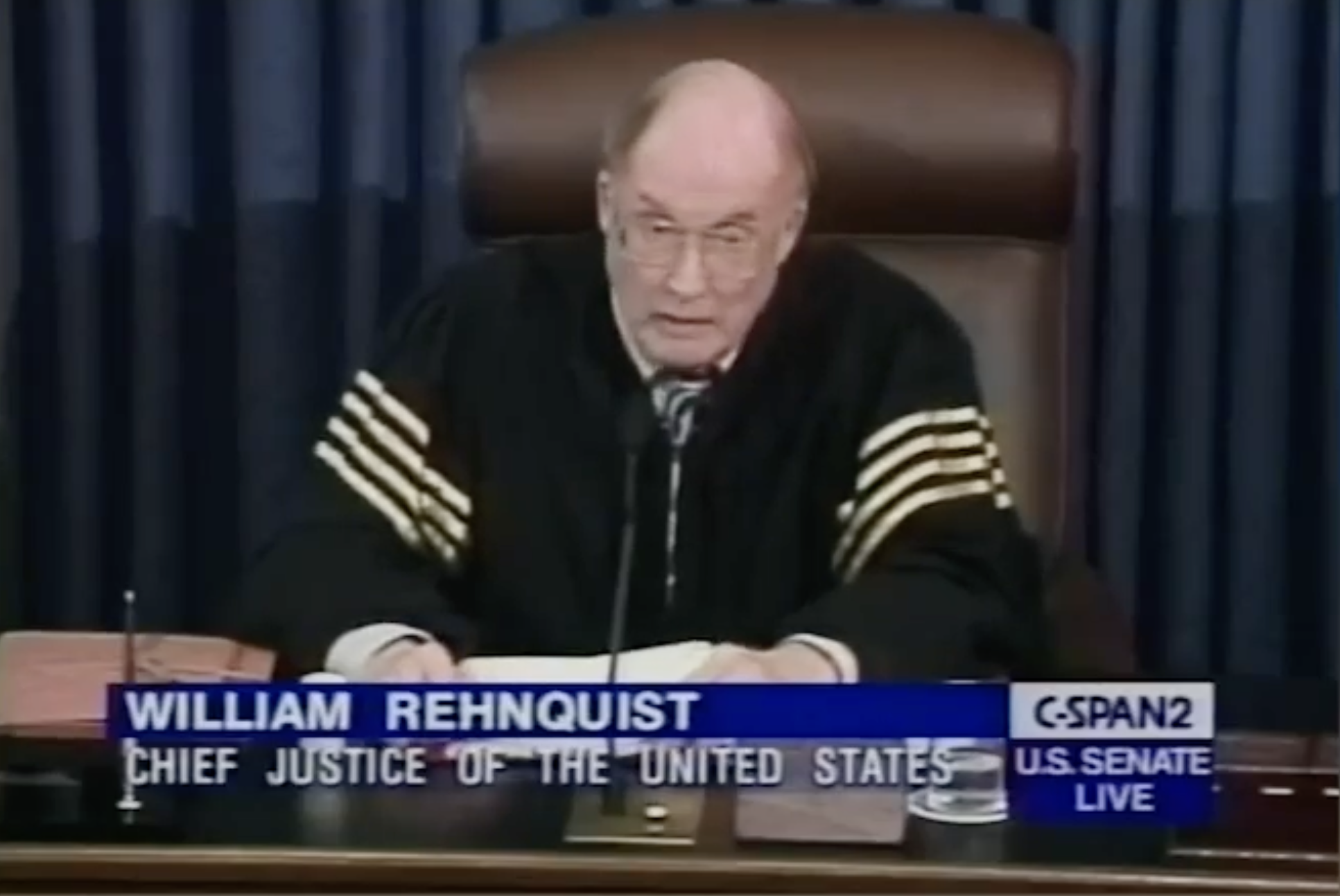
Chief Justice William Rehnquist serving as presiding officer during the 1999 impeachment trial of President Bill Clinton

Per Article I, Section 3, Clause 6 of the US Constitution, the chief justice serves as the presiding officer in a trial of an incumbent president. This provision prevents the vice president, who is the president of the Senate and generally holds the authority to preside over Senate business, from overseeing an impeachment trial that would elevate him or her to the presidency if the president were removed. This was particularly important at the time of the Constitution's writing, as, before the reforms of the Twelfth Amendment to the Constitution, presidents and vice presidents were not elected together on tickets and could potentially be of rival political factions. The Constitution does not specify who should serve as the presiding officer of impeachment trials of persons other than incumbent presidents. In such impeachments, the presiding officer has most often been the president of the Senate, meaning either the vice president of the United States or (in the vice president's absence) the president pro tempore of the Senate. Other trials have had a senator other than the president pro tempore serve as presiding officer, with such a senator having been chosen to preside by a vote of the Senate.

The presiding officer can rule on questions, such as those related to the admission of evidence. Their rulings stand as the Senate's judgment on those particular questions unless the Senate votes to overrule them. Alternatively, the presiding officer can forgo ruling on a question and directly submit it to a Senate vote. Senators who act as the presiding officer of an impeachment hearing are still permitted to vote in the trial.

In the 1999 impeachment trial of President Bill Clinton, the second instance of a presidential impeachment, Chief Justice William Rehnquist was an intentionally passive presiding officer, once commenting on his stint as presiding officer, "I did nothing in particular, and I did it very well."

In a 2011 journal article, Roy E. Brownell II posited the view that when a chief justice presides over a presidential impeachment trial, they are temporarily acting as an officer of the legislative branch rather than as a member of the judiciary. Brownell pointed to the fact that senate impeachment trials and the chief justice are not included within Article III of the Constitution (which establishes the judiciary), but are instead solely contained within Article I (establishing the legislature) to argue that in the context of their performance at presiding over presidential impeachment trials, the chief justice is acting as an effective member of legislative branch. Additionally, Brownell pointed to the practice of senators being able to overrule a chief justice's rulings as presiding officer as tacit affirmation that such rulings are made as a legislative officer rather than a judge. Brownell argued that the practice of permitting the Senate to override the chief justice during the trials affirms this due to the fact that the Supreme Court had ruled that congress lacks power to invalidate final judicial rulings (Plaut v. Spendthrift Farm, Inc., 514 U. S. 211 (1995)). He also noted to the fact that chief justices having at times been addressed as "Mr. President" rather than "your honor" during impeachment trials as being a tacit acknowledgement of this.

The second impeachment trial of Donald Trump (the only impeachment trial of a former president) was presided over by then-Senate President Pro Tempore Patrick Leahy due to Trump no longer being president when the trial began.

=== Role of senators ===
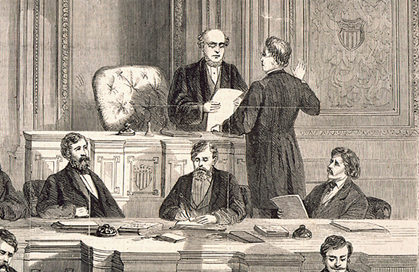
Chief Justice Salmon P. Chase, as presiding officer, administering the juror's oath to Senator Benjamin Wade for the 1868 impeachment trial of Andrew Johnson

In impeachment trials, the senators are generally referred to as acting as jurors. However, the 1999 impeachment trial of President Bill Clinton, Senator Tom Harkin objected to the use of the term "jurors", and Chief Justice William Rehnquist agreed with Harkin's position over that of the House impeachment managers (prosecutors), declaring, "The chair is of the view that the senator from Iowa's objection is well taken, that the core - the Senate is not simply a jury. It is a court in this case. And therefore, counsel should refrain from referring to the senators as jurors." This indicated a belief that the senators collectively take on a role that is perhaps more akin to a judge than to a jury.

Under Senate rules for impeachment trials, senators are able to call and subpoena witnesses for a trial. Senators are also able to submit written questions to witnesses as well as the prosecution and the defense.

If they desire, any senator may be excused from serving their role in an impeachment trial.

==== Rule XI trial committees ====
A Rule XI trial committee is a committee of senators that the Senate may appoint to receive evidence and hear testimony by witnesses on behalf of the Senate, reporting back to the full Senate and providing the full senate with a certified transcript of the proceedings that they witnessed. The use of such a committee allows for the majority of Senators to be absent during the presentation of evidence and witness testimony heard by the committee. Without use of such a committee, all senators would have to be present at the presentation of all evidence and witness testimony. Rule XI committees have been utilized in for four impeachment trials: the 1986 impeachment trial of Judge Harry E. Claiborne, the 1989 impeachment trials of Judges Walter Nixon and Alcee Hastings, and the 2010 trial of Judge Thomas Porteous.

=== Prosecution ===
==== House impeachment managers ====
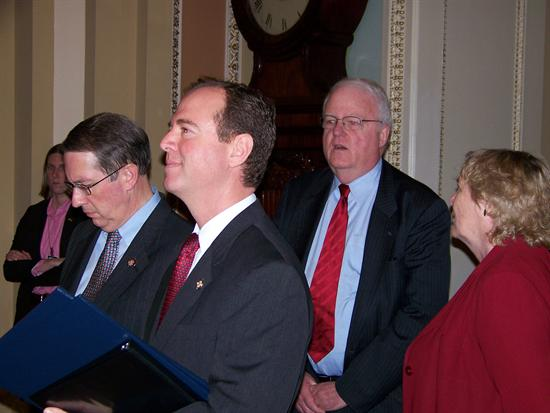
House impeachment managers for the 2009 trial of Judge Samuel B. Kent stand together before transferring the articles of impeachment to the Senate. (Left to right: Bob Goodlatte, Adam Schiff, Jim Sensenbrenner, Zoe Lofgren)

The U.S. House of Representatives appoints impeachment managers, a committee of members of the House who, together, act as the prosecutors in the impeachment trial.

While they are always approved by House vote, how the initial decision of who serves as a manager is arrived at has differed between impeachments. In some impeachments, the House managers have been chosen upon the recommendation of the Chairman of the House Committee on the Judiciary. Another way that has been used is by having the whole house decide by balloting who should serve. In some other impeachments, the speaker of the House has chosen the slate of impeachment managers and the House cast a vote approving the speakers' selections.

==== Legal counsel ====
Outside legal counsel can also be hired to provide advice to the impeachment managers. This was the case, for instance, in both the first and second impeachment trials of Donald Trump.

=== Defense ===
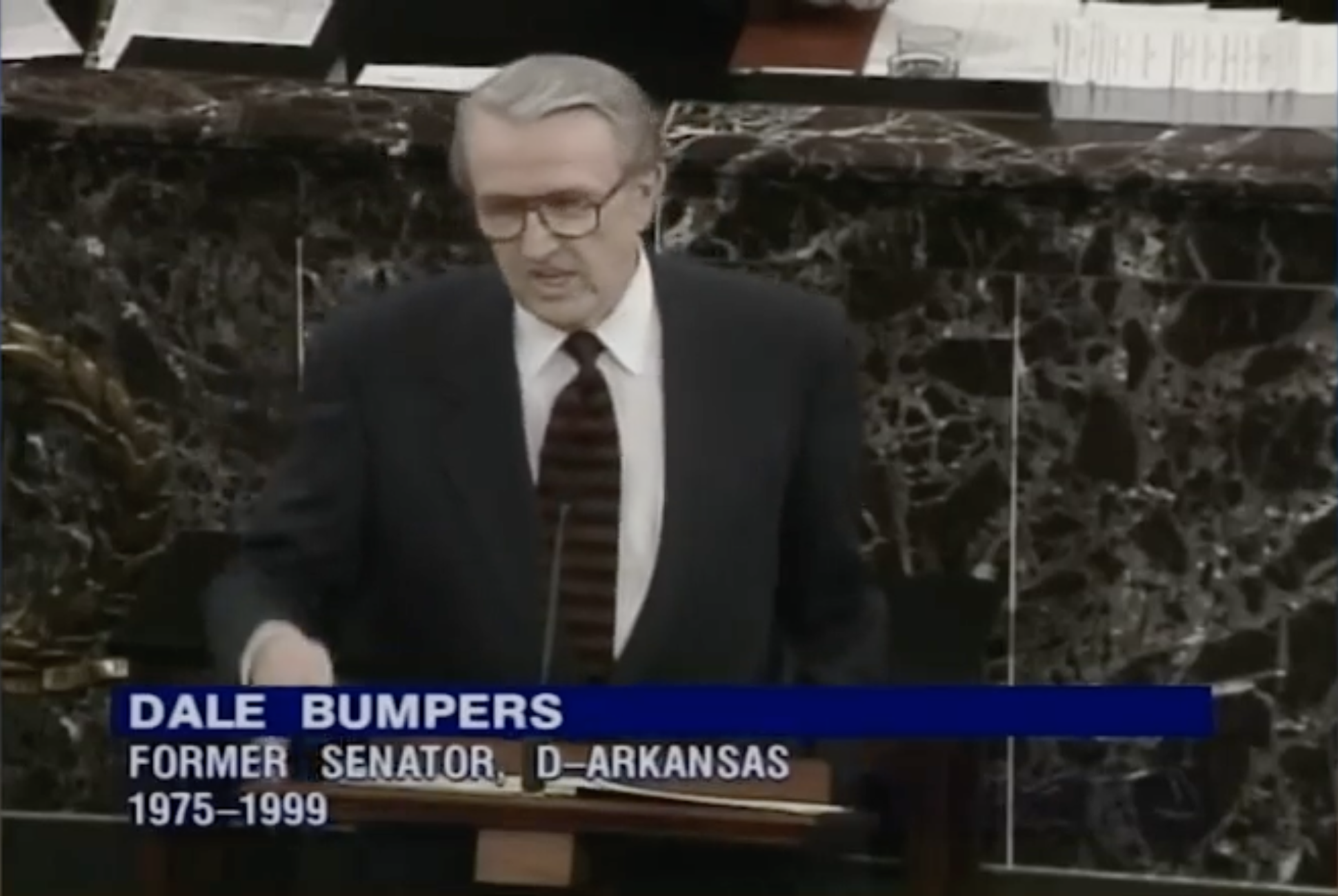
Dale Bumpers acting as a private defense counsel to President Bill Clinton during the 1999 impeachment trial of Clinton

==== Impeached officeholder ====
An impeached officeholder may appear at their impeachment trial. They may also opt not to appear in-person and instead be represented entirely through counsel.

==== Private counsel ====
In impeachment trials, an impeached officeholder can be represented by private counsel.

==== House defense team ====
In Donald Trump's first impeachment trial, in addition to private counsel, he had several House members (all belonging to his political party) serve on his defense.

== Rules ==
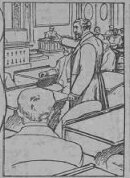
Proceedings during the 1905 impeachment trial of Charles Swayne

=== Constitutional ===
The Senate is granted the sole authority to try impeached individuals. Impeachment and impeachment trials are provided for by section four of Article Two of the Constitution. Impeachment trials are further outlined in section three, clause six of Article One of the Constitution.

The Constitution requires that a two-thirds majority vote "guilty" in order for an individual to be convicted and removed from office. There is no process provided to appeal an impeachment verdict. The Constitution also specifies that, after a conviction, the Senate may vote to additionally bar an individual from again holding federal office. The majority needed for this second matter is not specified by the Constitution, and the Senate has, in practice, used a simple majority vote for this.

The Constitution does not elaborate on specifications on the workings of an impeachment trial. Its only further specifications are that the chief justice of the United States presides over presidential impeachment trials, and that each senator must swear an oath. Therefore, the remainder of the mechanics of impeachment trials are left to the determination of the Senate itself.

=== Senate-adopted rules ===
==== Early Senate trials ====
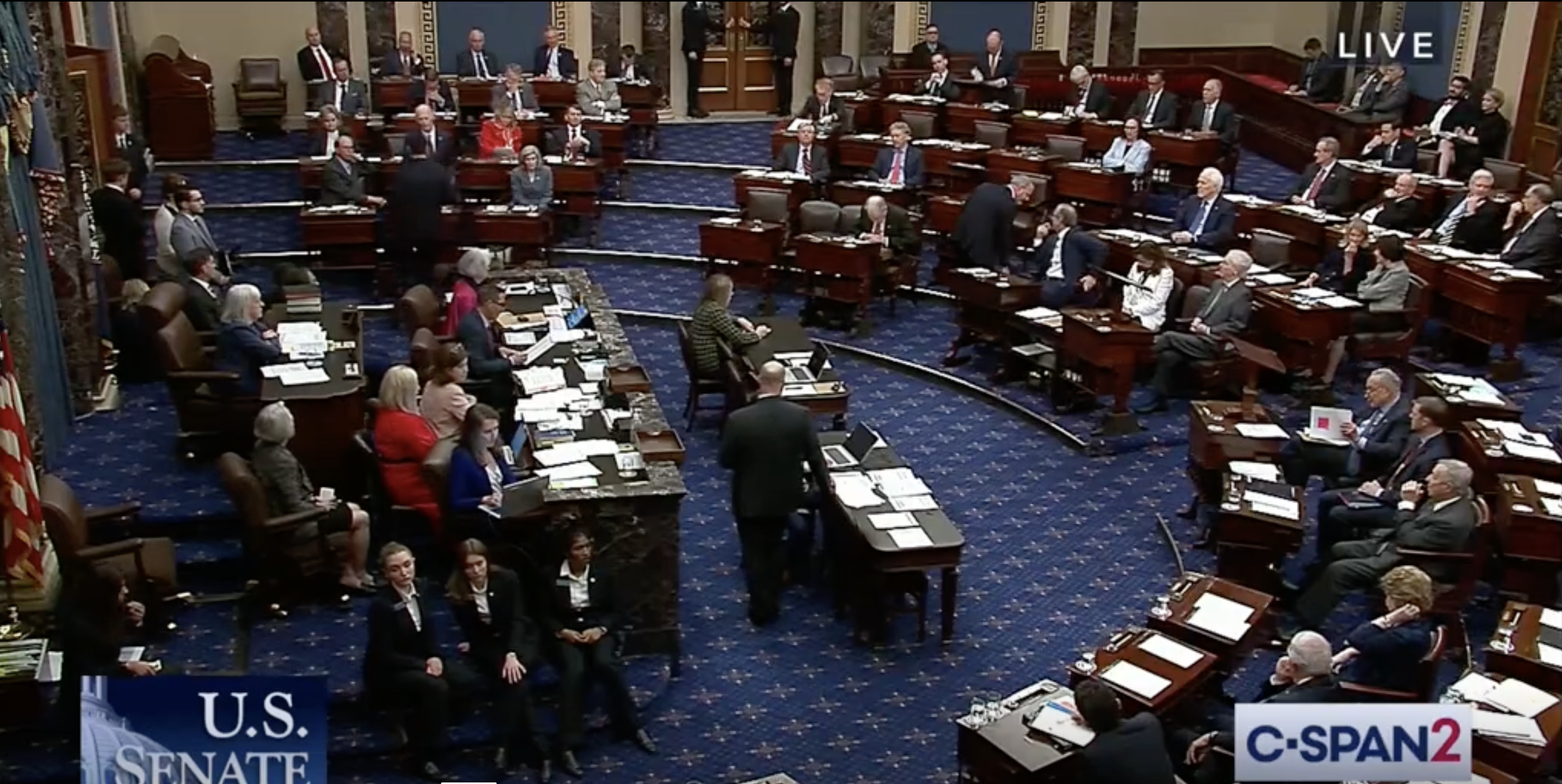
Senate convened for the 2024 impeachment trial of Alejandro Mayorkas

The first two impeachment trials in United States history (those of William Blount and John Pickering) had each had their own individual set of rules. The nineteen rules established for the trial of Samuel Chase appear also to have been used for the later trials of James H. Peck and West Hughes Humphreys.

==== Rules in use since 1868 ====
The exact language of the rules used for previous trials could not be utilized for 1868 impeachment trial of President Andrew Johnson because those rules used wording specific to a trial being presided over by an officer of the Senate (as had been the case for all previous impeachment trials), while the Constitution stipulated that impeachments trials for incumbent presidents are to be presided over by the chief justice of the United States. Because of this, a select committee of senators was tasked with developing rules to be used in the impeachment trial of Johnson. The select committee decided that they would create permanent rules that would be used for any future impeachments, declaring it to be, "proper to report general rules for the trial of all impeachments". Indeed, since 1868, impeachment trials in the U.S. Senate have been governed by the rules created for the impeachment trial of Andrew Johnson, known as the "Rules of Procedure and Practice in the Senate when Sitting on Impeachment Trials". Very few changes have been made to these rules since 1868. The rules were not altered until after the 1933 impeachment trial of Harold Louderback, when a single rule change was made. In the 1970s, the Senate Committee on Rules and Administration explored the possibly of altering the rules in advance of an anticipated impeachment trial that might have resulted from the impeachment process against Richard Nixon, but after to Nixon resigned without being impeached and convicted, this was momentarily abandoned. The rule changes explored in the 1970s were not adopted until the Senate acted upon a further recommendation to adopt them in 1986. No further changes have been made since to the rules outlined for the Johnson trial.

Among other things, the rules specify what oaths must be said and the order certain events are to occur in. However, many important matters are left unspecified by these rules.

The Senate rules states that, as soon as impeachment managers are appointed, the Senate must "immediately" receive them.

The impeached official may appear in person at their trial. They may, alternatively, opt not to appear in person at their trial, instead being represented solely through counsel.

===== Rule XI =====
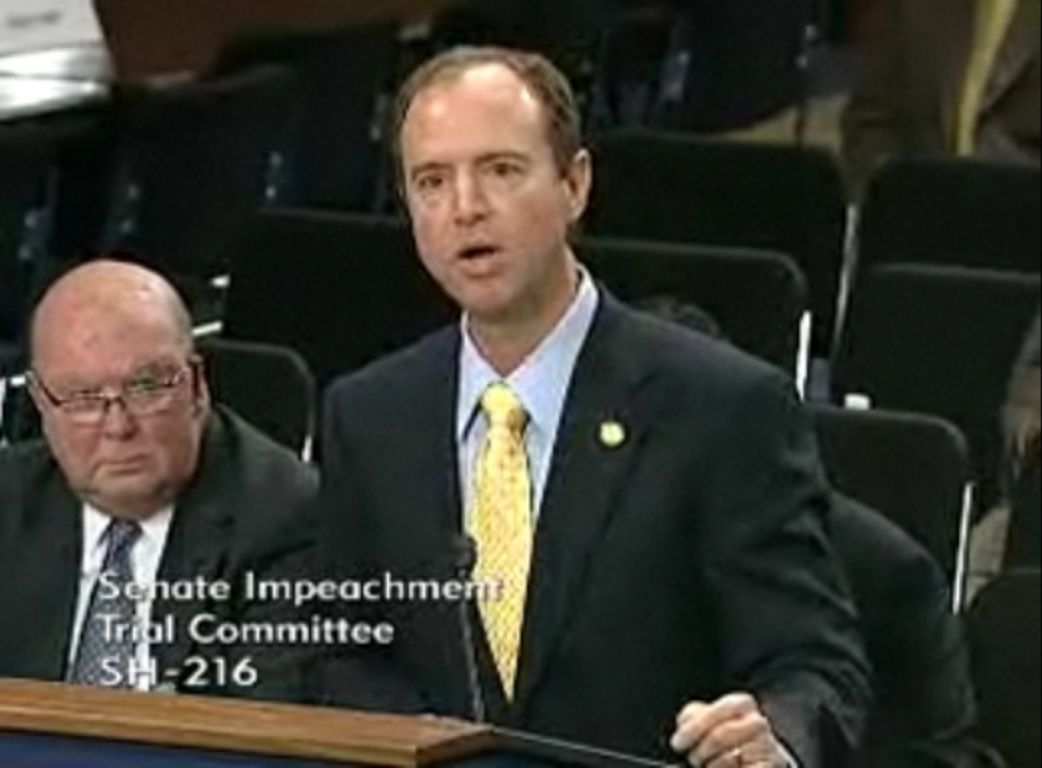
Impeached Judge Thomas Porteous (left) watches House impeachment manager Adam Schiff argue before a Rule XI trial committee in September 2010

Rule XI, allowing for the appointment of "Rule XI committees" was adopted by the Senate in 1934 as a simple resolution offered by Senator Henry F. Ashurst. Rule XI states,

That in the trial of any impeachment the Presiding Officer of the Senate, if the Senate so orders, shall appoint a committee of senators to receive evidence and take testimony at such times and places as the committee may determine.

This rule change was motivated by the 1933 impeachment trial of Judge Harold Louderback, which highlighted the difficulties that could be brought by requiring a plenary session of the senate for all aspects of a lengthy impeachment trial during a busy legislative period.

The constitutionality of this rule change was called into question by some senators soon after its passage, motivating the Senate to opt against using a rule committee for the 1936 impeachment trial of Judge Halsted L. Ritter. Its constitutionality was tested by the Supreme Court of the United States in the 1993 Nixon v. United States case, arising from the 1989 impeachment trial of Walter Nixon, in which the Supreme Court upheld the United States Senate's authority to determine its own procedures, which includes its decision to opt for use of Rule XI trial committees.

=== Determining the admissibility of evidence ===
No standard rules of evidence have been adopted by the Senate to be used for impeachment trials. Therefore, the presiding officer has authority to rule on evidentiary question. Alternatively, the presiding officer may put evidentiary questions to a vote by senators, or an individual senator may make a motion for the senators to hold such a vote.

Since the impeachment trials are not legally bound to any statutory evidentiary rules, arguments about the admissibility of evidence during the trials are often argued on the basis of Senate precedent. Such precedent, however, is merely persuasive and not binding. Under the procedures that current Senate rules for impeachment trials create, objections on the admissibility of evidence are first ruled upon by the presiding officer, with a majority vote of the Senate being capable overruling a decision by the presiding officer. The rules state that while the presiding officer has the authority to rule on "questions of relevancy, materiality, and redundancy of evidence and incidental questions", the Senate reserve the right to "questions of relevancy, materiality, and redundancy of evidence and incidental questions". Implicit in these rules is that some basic standard of relevancy is expected for evidence to be admissible.

In more recent impeachment trials, parties have often cited the Federal Rules of Evidence as persuasive authority in motions to either include or exclude evidence from an impeachment trial. A 2023 Congressional Research Service report observed that the Senate has acted receptively of these rules being cited as persuasive authority. In the 1986 impeachment trial of Judge Alcee L. Hastings a point was made that while the Senate is not bound by the Federal Rules of Evidence, the rules still "may provide some guidance," in determining the admissibility of evidence. However, a counter-argument was also posited, that these rules are not useful for impeachment trial since senators (unlike criminal juries) are not legally barred from reviewing prejudicial evidence.

=== Other matters ===
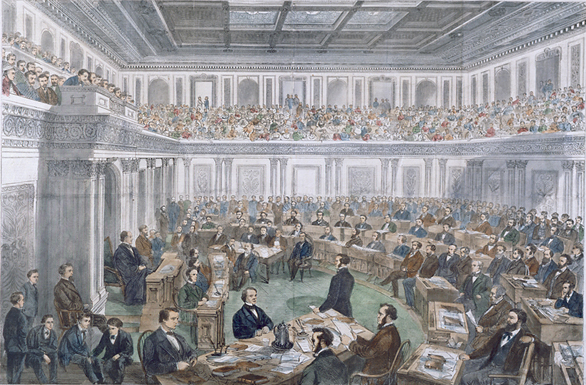
Illustration of the Senate Chamber during the 1868 impeachment trial of Andrew Johnson

An impeachment trial can be adjourned sine die at any time by a simple majority vote, effectively ending a trial without completion. This occurred in the 1868 impeachment trial of Andrew Johnson, with the Senate adjourning sine die without voting on all of the articles of impeachment.

There is an argument that the Senate could hold a "summary trial", reaching their judgment without holding a full trial or hearing evidence. In 1986, the impeachment managers for the trial of Judge Harry E. Claiborne argued that this would be permissible. However, the impeachment managers for the 1999 impeachment trial of Bill Clinton argued that it would not be allowed. In 1999, Senator (and future president) Joe Biden published a memorandum laying out an argument that the Senate has the right to reach a judgment in this manner. This precedent was cited in the Senate's decision to commence with the second impeachment trial of Donald Trump after he had already left office.

In 2021, University of Alabama School of Law professor Ronald Krotoszynski wrote an article in Politico opining that it is possible for the Senate to end the argument phase of an impeachment trial early and move instead to closing arguments if it took a majority vote in favor of a motion to do so. He likened it to a motion for summary judgement in a civil court.

The Senate has, by majority votes, multiple times judged that an individual impeached while in office can still be subjected to a trial, conviction, and the penalty of disqualification even after they leave office. Both the Senate and the House have, in the past, judged themselves to be able to utilize their impeachment authorities on former officeholders. The principal precedent for both impeaching a former officeholder and for holding an impeachment trial of a former officeholder is the impeachment and impeachment trial of William W. Belknap, who had resigned as Secretary of War hours before he was impeached in 1876. Many scholars have argued that if impeachment could not apply to former officeholders, then the Senate's power to disqualify individuals from holding future federal office through an impeachment process would be greatly weakened, as there would be a loophole of resigning before this sentence is imposed by the Senate.

Since the Constitution only gives the Senate the power to try an impeached individual, and does not require them to do so, it is possible for the Senate to forgo holding a trial of an impeached individual.

Since the Senate does not need to hold an impeachment trial after a House impeachment, it can also choose not to hold trials in instances where individuals resigned following impeachment. Of the twenty-one individuals to be impeached by the United States House of Representatives, only Mark W. Delahay did not face a trial, as the Senate decided not to hold a trial into him after he resigned his office following his impeachment by the House. A trial can also be dismissed without completion. This has been done before in instances when officeholders resigned partway into an impeachment trial against them. The House and the Senate have both each once moved to dismiss impeachment proceedings against officials that resigned partway in to impeachment trials. The Senate did this in 1926 by dismissing the proceedings against Judge George W. English. The House did this by passing a simple resolution in 2009 to end the proceedings against Judge Samuel B. Kent.

The House is not required to immediately transfer the articles of impeachment to the Senate after passage, and can deliberately postpone their transfer if the House desires to, thus delaying the initiation of a trial.

Additional rules are agreed to before an impeachment trial. This includes rules governing significant details of the trial itself, such as whether witnesses will be permitted. This also includes guidelines governing the presence of news media within the Senate Chamber. The rules adopted regarding press coverage within the Senate chamber have differed between impeachment trials. This also includes mundane details, such as what beverages may be consumed by senators in the Senate Chamber during the trial. By obscure convention, this has tended to be limited to water, sparkling water, and milk.

== Proceedings of an impeachment trial under current conventions ==
Minimal guidance is provided by the Constitution as to events in trials and their order other than the stipulation for an oath to be taken by senators and the stipulation that a vote on whether to disqualify an official from holding federal office again may only be held after a successful vote to convict. Nevertheless, impeachment trials have taken a standard form with several stages. Some of this structure arises directly from the rules that have been utilized for United States federal impeachment trials since the 1868 impeachment trial of Andrew Johnson, while others arise from informal convention.

=== Initial actions by the House and Senate ===
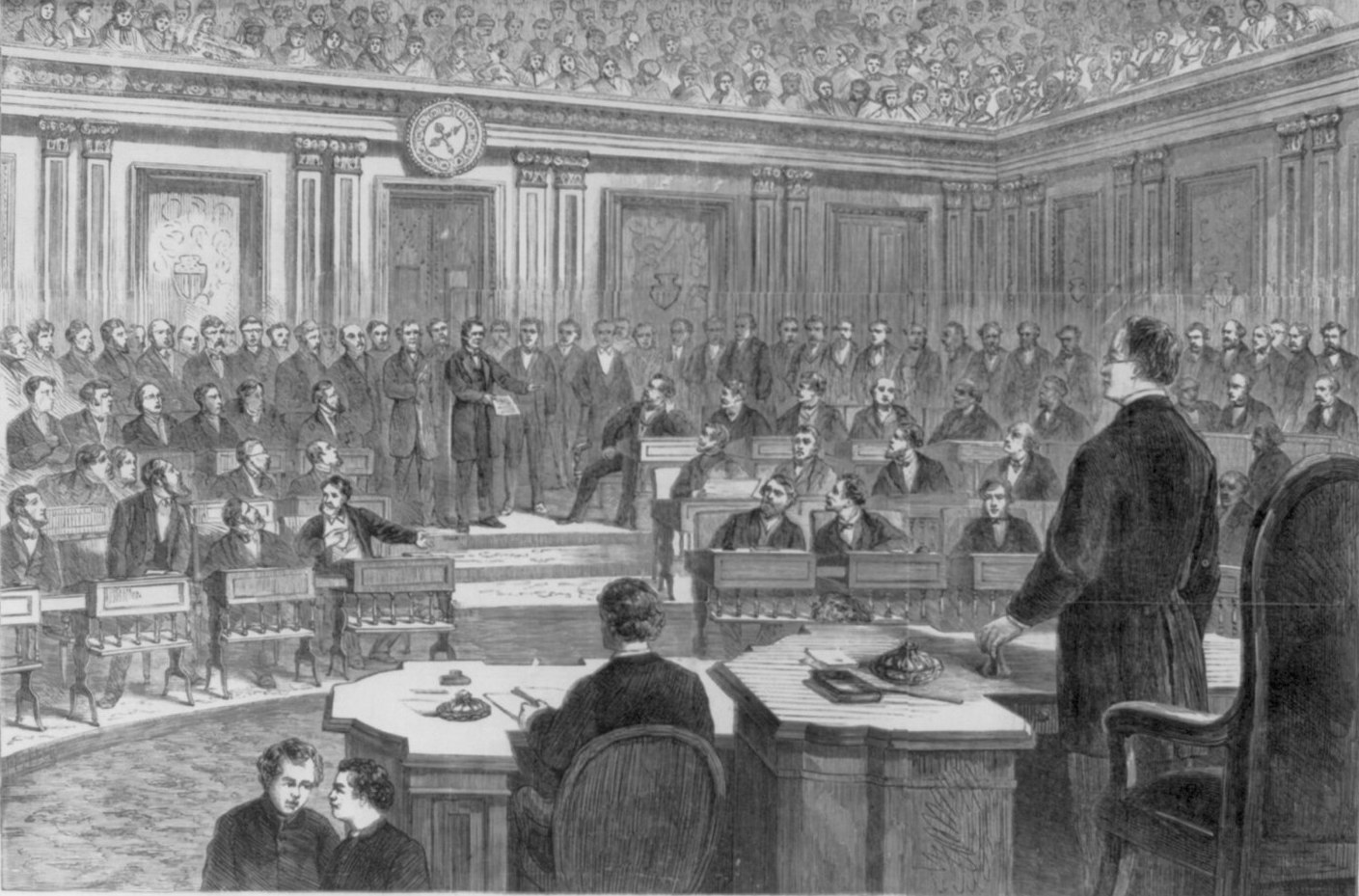
The Senate hears Congressmen John Bingham and Thaddeus Stevens inform them of the impeachment of Andrew Johnson

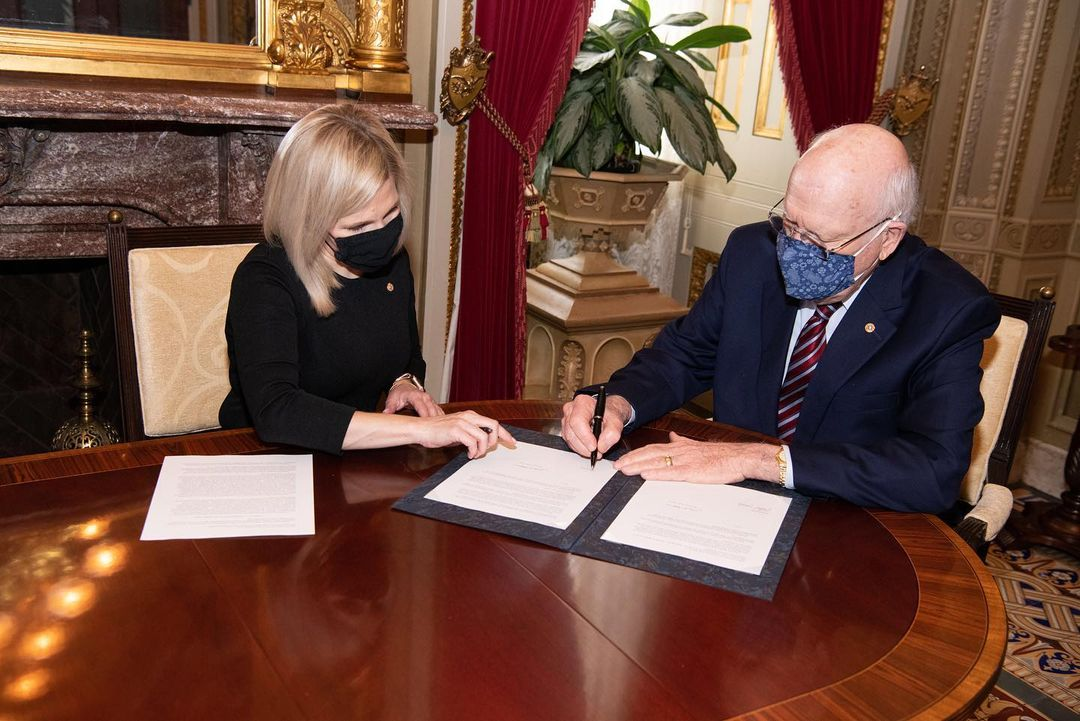
Secretary of the Senate Julie E. Adams (left) and Senator Patrick Leahy signing the summons for the second impeachment trial of Donald Trump

After an impeachment is adopted in the House, the House appoints the impeachment managers.

After the House has impeached an official, they also send the Senate notification of this action. The Senate, after receiving this notification, then adopts an order informing the House that it is prepared to receive the impeachment managers. Next, the impeachment managers appear before the bar of the Senate and exhibit the articles of impeachment, transferring the articles to the Senate. After this, the managers return to the House and make a verbal report there.

=== Ceremonial start and continued steps ===
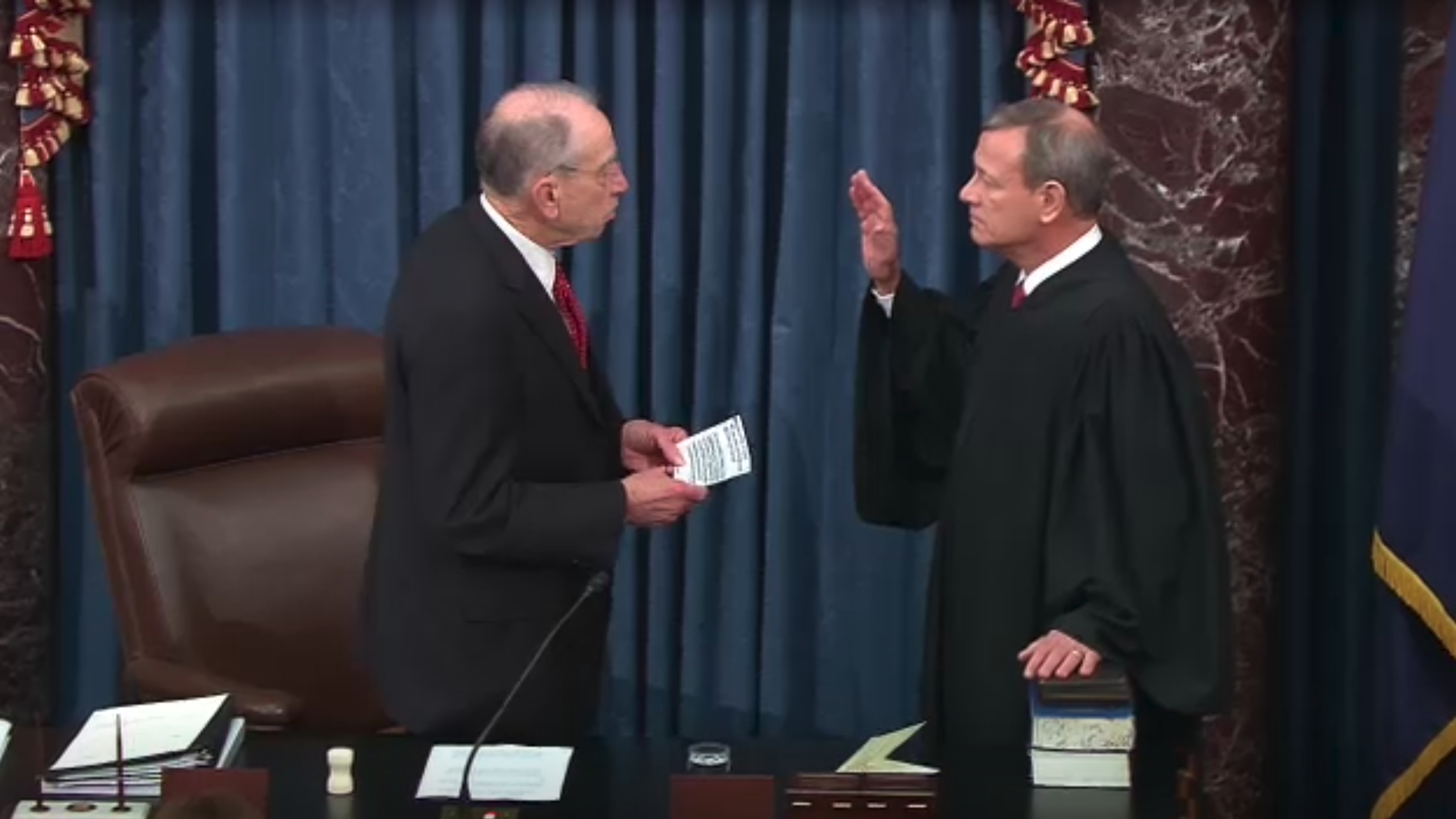
Senator Chuck Grassley (left) administers the oath to Chief Justice John Roberts to serve as presiding officer of the first impeachment trial of Donald Trump

A federal impeachment trial ceremonial starts with the House impeachment managers presenting to the Senate the articles of impeachment which the official will be tried on by reading them. After this, the presiding officer takes their oath for the trial, and then proceeds to provide the juror's oath to the senators. The Senate will issue a writ of summons to the impeached official. They will also request that a written answer be filed.

After the oaths are sworn and summons are issued, details for the trial proceedings may be hammered out and procedural work might be undertaken for several days. Senators may set additional rules specific to the trial itself. Documentation provided by both the defense and prosecution are also distributed to senators. Before the argument stage beings, the Senate might hold a vote to formally approve of rules to be used for the trial.

=== Pleading stage ===
In the pleading stage, on the date specified by the Senate in the writ of summons, the impeached official is to appear either in person to plead or be represented by counsel that will provide a plea on their behalf. The impeached official and their counsel may also demur, arguing that the impeached official is not a civil official that can be subject to an impeachment, or argue that there are not sufficient grounds for impeachment in the articles brought against them. The impeached official may answer the articles brought against them. The House impeachment managers are also permitted to provide a response to such an answer. After the pleading stage, a date will be set for the formal trial to begin.

=== Argument stage ===
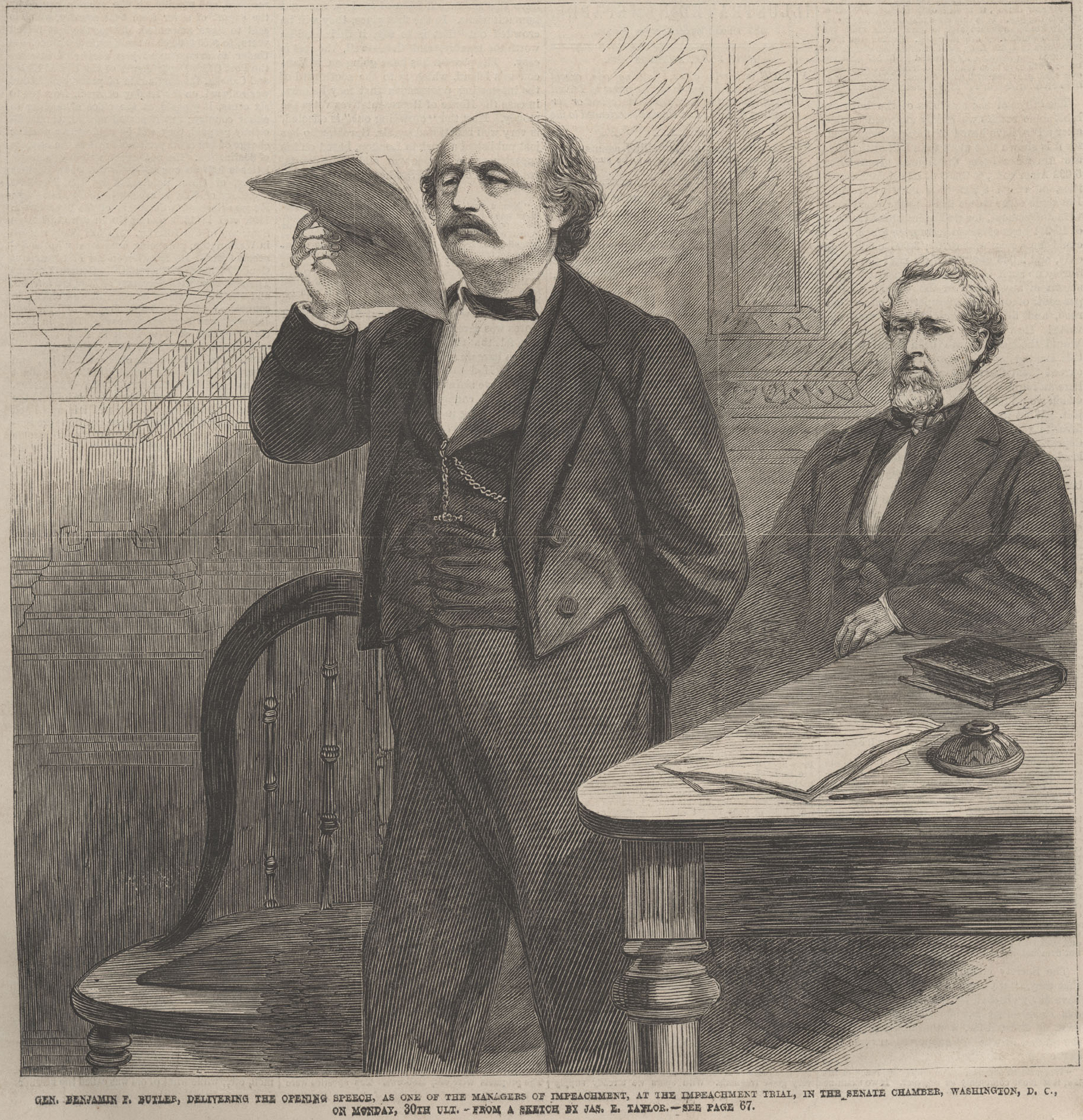
Benjamin Butler delivering the House managers' opening arguments during the 1868 impeachment trial of Andrew Johnson

The formal trial begins with an argument stage. Senators are prohibited from speaking during the argument stage. To start the argument stage, opening statements are presented by both the prosecution and the defense, with the prosecution (represented by the House managers) delivering their opening argument first. After opening statements, each side presents their full case. There are not specified rules as to which side is supposed to present their full case first. Evidence may be presented and witnesses might be examined and cross-examined, with the Senate deciding on whether to allow this.

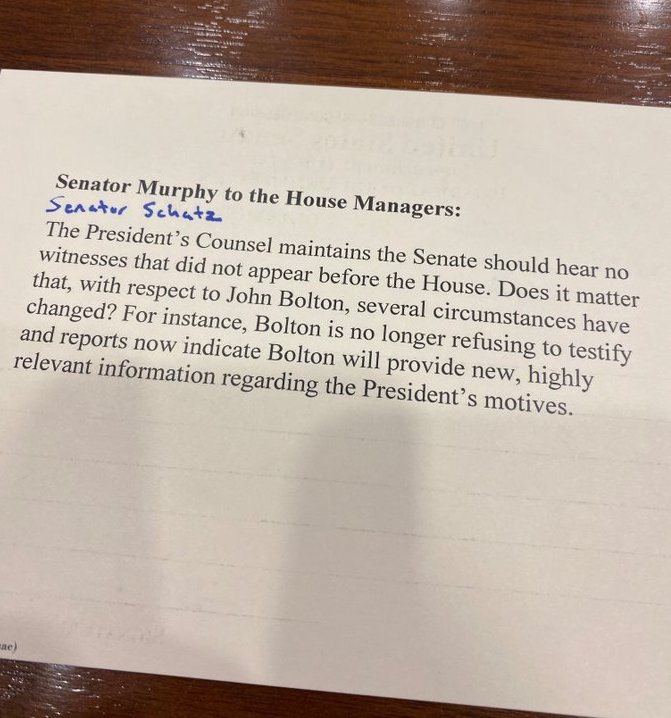
A question for the House managers of the first impeachment trial of Donald Trump prepared by Senator Chris Murphy

After arguments are first presented, senators have an opportunity to present written questions to the representation of the two parties to the trial (the prosecution and the defense). Senators are prohibited from speaking during the questioning stage, so their questions are given to the presiding officer who reads aloud the question to the parties on the senators' behalf.

After the questioning stage, further evidence might be brought in and witnesses might be brought in to provide testimony. The Senate may, alternatively, vote to end this part of the trial without allowing for this.

=== Closing arguments ===
Closing arguments are presented by both the prosecution and the defense. The House managers, representing the prosecution, will both open and close the final argument stage.

After the closing arguments, the Senate might opt to vote for senators to hold closed-door deliberations in which they will debate among themselves.

=== Verdict ===
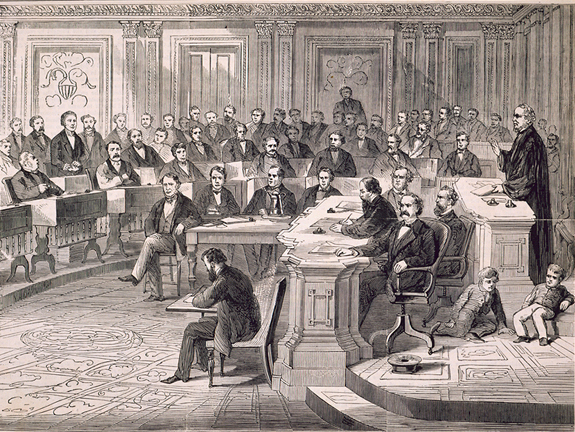
Illustration of the Senate recording the vote of Edmund G. Ross on the tenth article of impeachment during the 1868 impeachment trial of Andrew Johnson

The verdict ("judgment of the Senate") is delivered in open session. It is possible that, before the Senate would proceed to vote on whether to convict, a senator might motion to introduce a resolution to censure the official. The reason for presenting such a resolution would be to provide an alternative means for the Senate to express dismay about wrongdoings without convicting and removing an official from office.

When the Senate then votes on the verdict, they first vote on whether to convict. Conviction requires a two-thirds majority. Regardless of the number of articles of impeachment that are being tried, conviction on a single article triggers a removal from office for an incumbent officeholder. If a conviction occurs, the Senate then has the option of holding an additional vote as to whether to ban the official from holding federal office again, which only requires a simple majority. A vote to ban, however, cannot be held unless a conviction has first passed the two-thirds majority threshold.

The Senate does not always vote on each article of impeachment. For example: in the 1868 impeachment trial of Andrew Johnson, the Senate voted on only three of the eleven articles of impeachment before adjourning sine die.

=== Closing procedures ===
A trial ends with procedural motions. After the close of the trial, senators are given an opportunity to deliver speeches.

== Media coverage ==
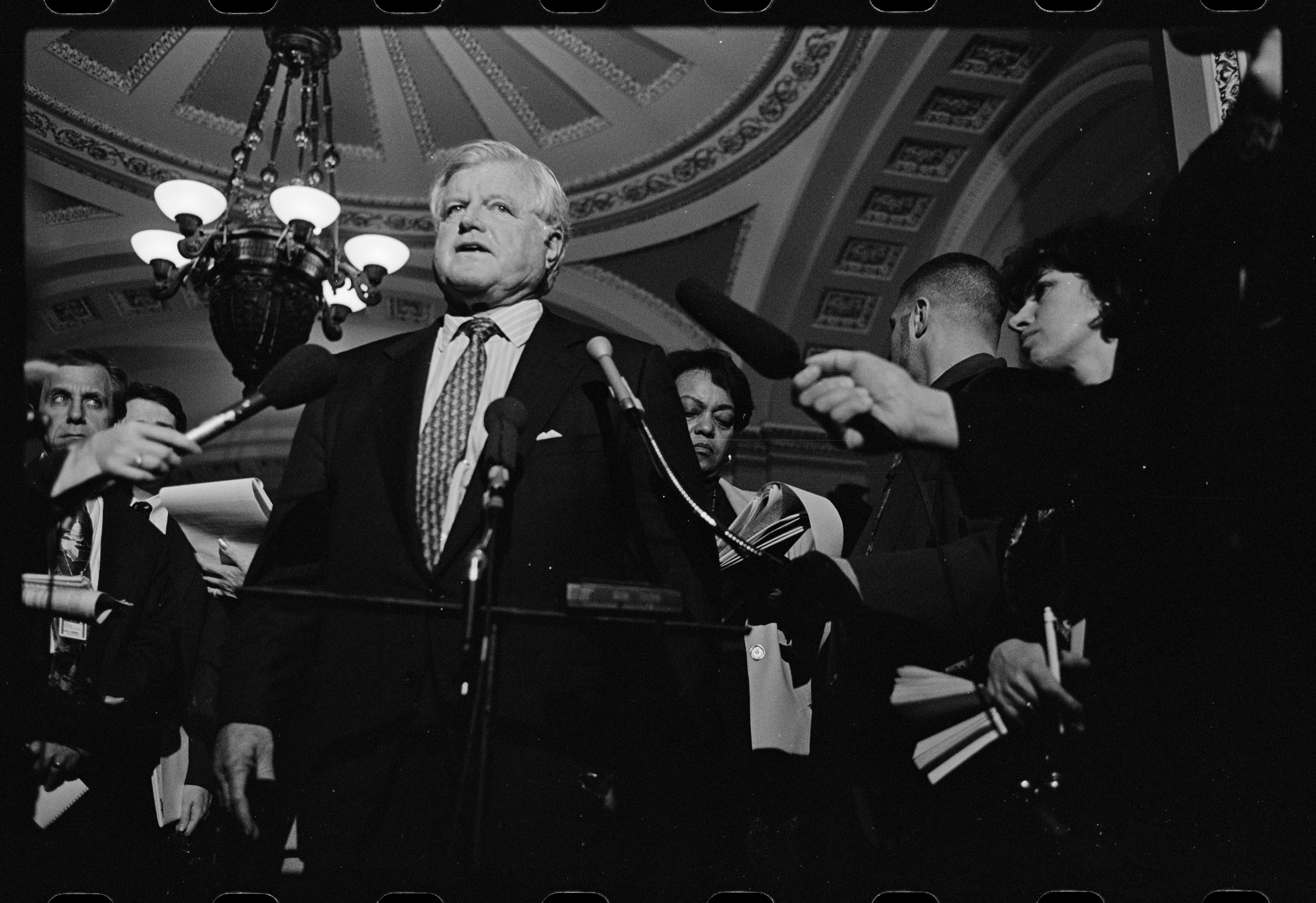
Senator Ted Kennedy speaking to reporters outside of the Senate Chamber at the time of the 1999 impeachment trial of Bill Clinton

The Trial Rule XI committee hearings and subsequent trial of Judge Harry E. Claiborne were televised in 1986. This was the first impeachment trial held after television became a broadly adopted medium.

Presidential impeachments have generated significant press coverage. Political bias of some news outlets have been observed to shape their coverage of presidential impeachments, which have been often seen as highly partisan affairs.

The Senate sets guidelines for press coverage within the Senate Chamber during impeachment trials.

== List of trials ==
Roughly half of impeachment trials held in the United States Senate have resulted in a verdict of conviction, thereby removing the impeached official.

List of United States federal impeachment trials
Impeached individual	Office	Primary allegation(s) of articles	Date of impeachment in House of impeachment	Dates of trial in Senate	Days expired between first and last day of trial proceedings	Result	Presiding officer	House impeachment managers
William Blount	Senator	Conspiring to assist Great Britain seize Spanish-controlled Louisiana	July 7, 1797	December 17, 1798–January 11, 1799	26 days	Dismissed when Senate decided it lacked jurisdiction, either because Blount had already been expelled from the Senate on July 8, 1797 or because he had never been "a civil officer of the United States within the meaning of the Constitution"	President Pro Tempore of the Senate John Laurance	James A. Bayard; Samuel W. Dana; John Dennis; Thomas Evans; William Gordon; Robert Goodloe Harper; Hezekiah L. Hosmer; James Henderson Imlay; Thomas Pinckney; Samuel Sewall; Samuel Sitgreaves; John W. Kittera
John Pickering	Judge	Loose morals, Intoxication on the bench and unlawful handling of property claims	March 3, 1803	January 4–March 12, 1804	69 days	Guilty		William Blackledge; John Boyle; George W. Campbell; Joseph Clay; Peter Early; William Eustis; Samuel L. Mitchill; Thomas Newton Jr.; Joseph Hopper Nicholson; John Randolph of Roanoke; Caesar Augustus Rodney
Samuel Chase	Associate justice of the U.S. Supreme Court	Arbitrary and oppressive conduct of trials	March 12, 1804	December 7, 1804–March 1, 1805	114 days	Acquitted	Vice President Aaron Burr	John Boyle; George W. Campbell; Peter Early; Roger Nelson^{α}; Christopher H. Clark^{α}; Joseph Hopper Nicholson; John Randolph of Roanoke; Caesar Augustus Rodney
James H. Peck	Judge	Abuse of contempt power	April 24, 1830	April 26, 1830–January 31, 1831	281 days	Acquitted	Vice President John C. Calhoun	George McDuffie; Ambrose Spencer; Henry R. Storrs; Charles A. Wickliffe; James Buchanan
West Hughes Humphreys	Judge	Refusing to hold court and waging war against the U.S. government by holding Confederate office and supporting Southern secession	May 6, 1862	May 22–April 26, 1862	36 days	Guilty	Vice President Hannibal Hamlin	John Bingham; George W. Dunlap; John Hickman; George H. Pendleton; Charles R. Train
Andrew Johnson	President	Violating the Tenure of Office Act by acting to remove Edwin Stanton from the office of secretary of war and other alleged high crimes and misdemeanors	February 24, 1868	March 5, 1868–May 26, 1868	83 days	Acquitted on 3 of 11 articles of impeachment; trial thereafter adjourned sine die	Chief Justice Salmon P. Chase	John Bingham; George S. Boutwell; Benjamin Butler; John A. Logan; Thaddeus Stevens; Thomas Williams; James F. Wilson
William W. Belknap	Former Secretary of War	Criminal disregard for office and acceptance of bribes in exchange for making official appointments	March 2, 1876	March 3–August 1, 1876	152 days	Acquitted	President Pro Tempore of the Senate Thomas W. Ferry	George Frisbie Hoar; George A. Jenks; J. Proctor Knott; Elbridge G. Lapham; Scott Lord; William Pitt Lynde; John A. McMahon
Charles Swayne	Judge	Abuse of contempt power and other misuses of office	December 13, 1904	December 14, 1904–February 26, 1905	74 days	Acquitted	Senator Orville H. Platt	David A. De Armond; Henry De Lamar Clayton Jr.; Marlin Edgar Olmsted; Henry Wilbur Palmer; James Breck Perkins; Samuel L. Powers; David Highbaugh Smith
Robert W. Archbald	Judge	Improper business relationships with litigants and acceptance of gifts	July 11, 1912	July 13, 1912–January 13, 1913	183 days	Guilty		Henry De Lamar Clayton Jr.; John W. Davis; John C. Floyd; L. Paul Howland; George W. Norris; John A. Sterling; Edwin Y. Webb
George W. English	Judge	Abuse of power	April 1, 1926	April 23–December 13, 1926	235 days	Trial ended without rendering a verdict; Senate ended proceedings without completing them after English had resigned from office		William D. Boies; Frederick H. Dominick; Ira G. Hersey; Earl C. Michener; Andrew Jackson Montague; Charles E. Moore; George R. Stobbs; John N. Tillman; Hatton W. Sumners
Harold Louderback	Judge	Favoritism in the appointment of bankruptcy receivers	February 24, 1933	March 9–May 24, 1933	77 days	Acquitted	Vice President John Nance Garner	Gordon Browning; Randolph Perkins; Ulysses Samuel Guyer; Lawrence Lewis; James Earl Major; Hatton W. Sumners
Halsted L. Ritter	Judge	Favoritism in the appointment of bankruptcy receivers and practicing law while servings as a sitting judge	March 2, 1936	March 10–April 17, 1936	39 days	Guilty	Senator Nathan L. Bachman	Sam Hobbs; Randolph Perkins; Hatton W. Sumners
Harry E. Claiborne	Judge	Income tax evasion and remaining on the bench following a criminal conviction	July 22, 1986	August 6, 1986–October 9, 1986	65 days	Guilty	Vice President George H. W. Bush	Peter W. Rodino; Robert Kastenmeier; William J. Hughes; Romano Mazzoli; Dan Glickman; Hamilton Fish IV; Henry Hyde; Tom Kindness; Mike DeWine
Alcee Hastings	Judge	Perjury and conspiring to solicit a bribe	August 3, 1988	August 9, 1988–October 20, 1989	437 days	Guilty	Senator Robert Byrd (Note: Senate Majority Leader till January January 2, 1989; effective January 3, 1989 he became Senate President Pro Tempore.)	John Bryant; John Conyers; Hamilton Fish IV; George Gekas; Jack Brooks; Mike Synar
Walter Nixon	Judge	Perjury before a federal grand jury	May 10, 1989	May 11–November 3, 1989	176 days	Guilty	President Pro Tempore of the Senate Robert Byrd	Jack Brooks; Don Edwards; Ben Cardin; William E. Dannemeyer; Jim Sensenbrenner
Bill Clinton	President	Perjury before a federal grand jury and obstruction of justice	December 19, 1998	January 7–February 12, 1999	37 days	Acquitted	Chief Justice William Rehnquist	Bob Barr; Ed Bryant; Steve Buyer; Charles Canady; Chris Cannon; Steve Chabot; George Gekas; Lindsey Graham; Asa Hutchinson; Henry Hyde; Bill McCollum; James E. Rogan; Jim Sensenbrenner
Samuel B. Kent	Judge	Sexual assault, obstructing and impeding an official preceding, and making false and misleading statements	June 19, 2009	June 24–July 22, 2009	29 days	Trial ended before verdict, House adopted a simple resolution to end proceedings without completing them after Kent resigned from office		Bob Goodlatte; Hank Johnson; Zoe Lofgren; Jim Sensenbrenner; Adam Schiff
Thomas Porteous	Judge	Acceptance of bribes and perjury	March 11, 2010	March 17–December 8, 2010	266 days	Guilty	President Pro Tempore of the Senate Daniel Inouye	Bob Goodlatte; Hank Johnson; Zoe Lofgren; Jim Sensenbrenner; Adam Schiff
Donald Trump	President	Abuse of power and obstruction of Congress	December 18, 2019	January 16, 2020–February 5, 2020	21 days	Acquitted	Chief Justice John Roberts	Jason Crow; Val Demings; Sylvia Garcia; Hakeem Jeffries; Zoe Lofgren; Jerry Nadler; Adam Schiff
Donald Trump	Former President	Incitement of insurrection	January 13, 2021	January 26, 2021–February 13, 2021	19 days	Acquitted	President Pro Tempore of the Senate Patrick Leahy	Joaquin Castro; David Cicilline; Madeleine Dean; Diana DeGette; Ted Lieu; Joe Neguse; Stacey Plaskett; Jamie Raskin; Eric Swalwell
Alejandro Mayorkas	Secretary of Homeland Security	Failure to comply with federal immigration laws and breaching the public trust	February 13, 2024	April 17, 2024	1 day	Both articles of impeachment were deemed by a vote of the Senate to be unconstitutional; Senate immediately thereafter voted to adjourn, ending the proceedings	President Pro Tempore of the Senate Patty Murray	Andy Biggs; Ben Cline; Andrew Garbarino; Mark Green; Marjorie Taylor Greene; Michael Guest; Harriet Hageman; Clay Higgins; Laurel Lee; Michael McCaul; August Pfluger
