= Impeachment trial of Samuel Chase =

1805 trial in the United States Senate

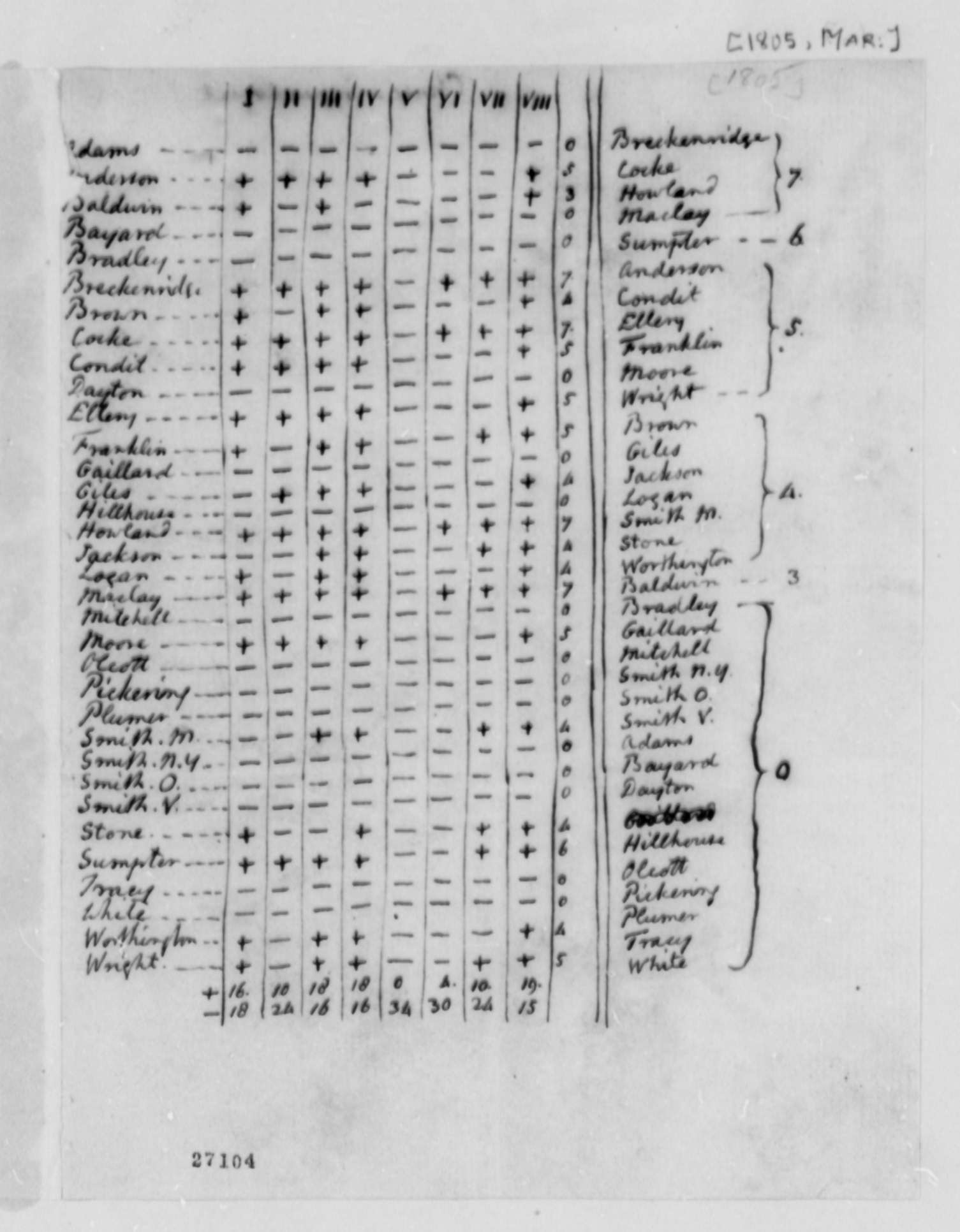
- Tally sheet of the Senate's judgement votes on Chase's impeachment
- Date: December 7, 1804 to March 1, 1805 (2 months, 3 weeks and 1 day)
- Accused: Samuel Chase, associate justice of the Supreme Court of the United States
- House managers: John Randolph of Roanoke (chairman); John Boyle; Peter Early; Roger Nelson; Joseph Hopper Nicholson; Caesar Augustus Rodney
- Defense counsel: Luther Martin (lead); Robert Goodloe Harper; Joseph Hopkinson; Charles Lee; Philip Barton Key
- Outcome: Acquitted by the Senate, remained in the office
- Charges: Eight high crimes and misdemeanors
- Cause: Partisan motivations
- Accusation: Article II
- Votes in favor: 10
- Votes against: 24
- Accusation: Article III
- Votes in favor: 18
- Votes against: 16
- Accusation: Article IV
- Votes in favor: 18
- Votes against: 16
- Accusation: Article V
- Votes in favor: 0
- Votes against: 34
- Accusation: Article VI
- Votes in favor: 4
- Votes against: 30
- Accusation: Article VII
- Votes in favor: 10
- Votes against: 24
- Accusation: Article VIII
- Votes in favor: 19
- Votes against: 15

An impeachment trial was held in the United States Senate in 1805, coming after the impeachment of Samuel Chase (associate justice of the Supreme Court of the United States) by the United States House of Representatives. There had been strong partisan political motivations behind the House's impeachment of Chase, with the Thomas Jefferson-led Democratic-Republican Party aiming to weaken a judiciary that had been largely shaped by the opposing Federalist Party. Chase was acquitted in the impeachment trial (held in the United States Senate), with none of the eight articles of impeachment managing to receive the two-thirds majority necessary for a conviction. The outcome helped to solidify norms of an independent judiciary and impeachments requiring more than just a disagreement between an official and the Congress.

== Background ==
The Senate was controlled by Jeffersonian Democratic-Republicans at the time of the trial. With a 25–9 majority, they had a two-thirds supermajority hypothetically capable of securing Chase's conviction in even a party-line vote.

The impeachment of Samuel Chase, an associate justice of the United States Supreme Court, was politically motivated. A high-profile affair at the time, The impeachment pitted the two major United States political parties of the era against each other amid a battle between the parties over, among other things, what the role of Federal courts should look like. The era preceding the impeachment had seen heated political battle between the Federalists, led by John Adams, and the Democratic–Republicans, led by Thomas Jefferson. The Supreme Court of the United States was regarded at the time to be strongly partisan to the Federalist Party. The impeachment was in large part a reaction to this lean of the Supreme Court. Associate Justice Chase was viewed to be the most partisan justice on the Supreme Court. He was a strong Federalist and publicly made known his opposition to President Thomas Jefferson. He had campaigned for Federalist incumbent John Adams during the 1800 presidential election.

The impeachment was also, in part, a reaction to the increase in the power of the Supreme Court in the previous years under Chief Justice John Marshall, including the landmark Marbury v. Madison decision. Democratic–Republicans saw the judiciary, and especially the Supreme Court, as an obstacle to their consolidation of power in government. When Jefferson took office, all six Supreme Court justices were Federalists, and by 1804, Jefferson had only gotten the chance to make a single appointment to fill a Supreme Court vacancy. President Jefferson, alarmed at the seizure of power by the judiciary through their claim of exclusive judicial review in Marbury v. Madison, led his party's efforts to remove the Federalists from the bench. When Thomas Jefferson took office as president in 1801, after defeating Federalist incumbent president John Adams in the 1800 presidential election, he became impatient with the independence of the judiciary. He believed that Congress or the executive should have more sway over federal judges, and believed that their appointment and removal should be more routine along the lines of other appointed public officers. The 1800 United States elections had not only seen Jefferson unseat Adams, but had also seen the Democratic–Republicans capture control of both chambers of the United States Congress in what Jefferson referred to as the "Revolution of 1800". The party had won a sizable enough number of seats in the chambers of the legislature to make the party hypothetically capable of impeaching and removing a federal official with only the votes of its own members.

=== Impeachment vote and adoption of articles of impeachment ===
Chase was impeached by the House on March 12, 1804. The following day, a special committee was appointed to draw up article of impeachment against Chase. Appointed to the committee were Congressmen John Boyle, Joseph Clay, Peter Early, Joseph Hopper Nicholson, and John Randolph of Roanoke. Seven articles of impeachment were reported to the House by Randolph on March 26, 1804, but were ordered to lie on the table and no action was taken on them before the congress entered a recess. On November 6, 1804, the articles were referred to a special committee consisting of Congressmen Joseph Clay, Peter Early, and John Randolph of Roanoke, and John Rhea. On November 30, 1804, at the end of impeachment inquiry activities, Congressman Randolph reported eight articles of impeachment to the House. On December 4, 1804, the House of Representatives held votes to adopt the eight articles of impeachment. All the counts involved Chase's work as a trial judge in lower circuit courts. In that day, Supreme Court justices had the added duty of individually serving on circuit courts. The Supreme Court's justices would only spend a small fraction of their time meeting together as appellate judges in Washington, D.C. The bulk of their time was spent acting as circuit judges in separate geographic areas of the United States. In this role they would serve in tandem with a federal district judge permanently assigned to that area's court. The Supreme Court's judges were not fond of the arrangement that saw them tasked with these circuit court duties. The heart of the allegations made against Chase was that political bias had led Chase to treat defendants and their counsel in a blatantly unfair manner. Despite the Democratic–Republican theory that impeachment did not require a criminal act, many of the articles focused on acts that were dubiously alleged to be criminal. It is unclear the exact reason that these charges were included among the articles of impeachment, but one theory is that John Randolph of Roanoke was interested in proving criminality on Chase's part, regardless of his own theory of impeachment not requiring criminality.

== Officers and parties ==
=== Vice President Aaron Burr (presiding officer) ===
Vice President Aaron Burr served as the presiding officer of the trial. At the time he had outstanding murder charges against him in two states resulting from his fatal shooting of Alexander Hamilton during the Burr–Hamilton duel. Presiding over the impeachment trial was among the last official duties Burr undertook as vice president, along with presiding over the certification of the Electoral College vote for the 1804 presidential election on February 13, 1805, in the middle of the impeachment trial. He would give his vice-presidential farewell speech to the Senate the day after the trial ended.

As the trial approached, perhaps to influence how Burr would conduct the trial, Jefferson began to give Burr increased attention. Burr received several invitations to dine at the President's House (the White House). Appointed to important offices in the newly-established government of the Louisiana Territory were Burr's stepson, Burr's brother-in-law, and Burr's close friend James Wilkinson. On a similar note, Senator William Branch Giles, a chief proponent of impeaching and removing Chase, distributed a petition urging Governor George Clinton of New York to see that the murder indictment against Burr be withdrawn. Many Democratic–Republican senators obliged to sign this petition. In his book Grand Inquests, William Rehnquist opined that he saw no historical evidence that Burr was persuaded by these overtures. Burr was highly praised for his performance as the presiding officer of the trial. However, some senators were discontent with how he had acted as presiding officer, with William Plumer writing in his daily diary, "Mr. Burr is remarkably testy—he acts more of the tyrant—is impatient, passionate—scolds—he is in a rage because we do not sit longer."

=== Impeachment managers ===
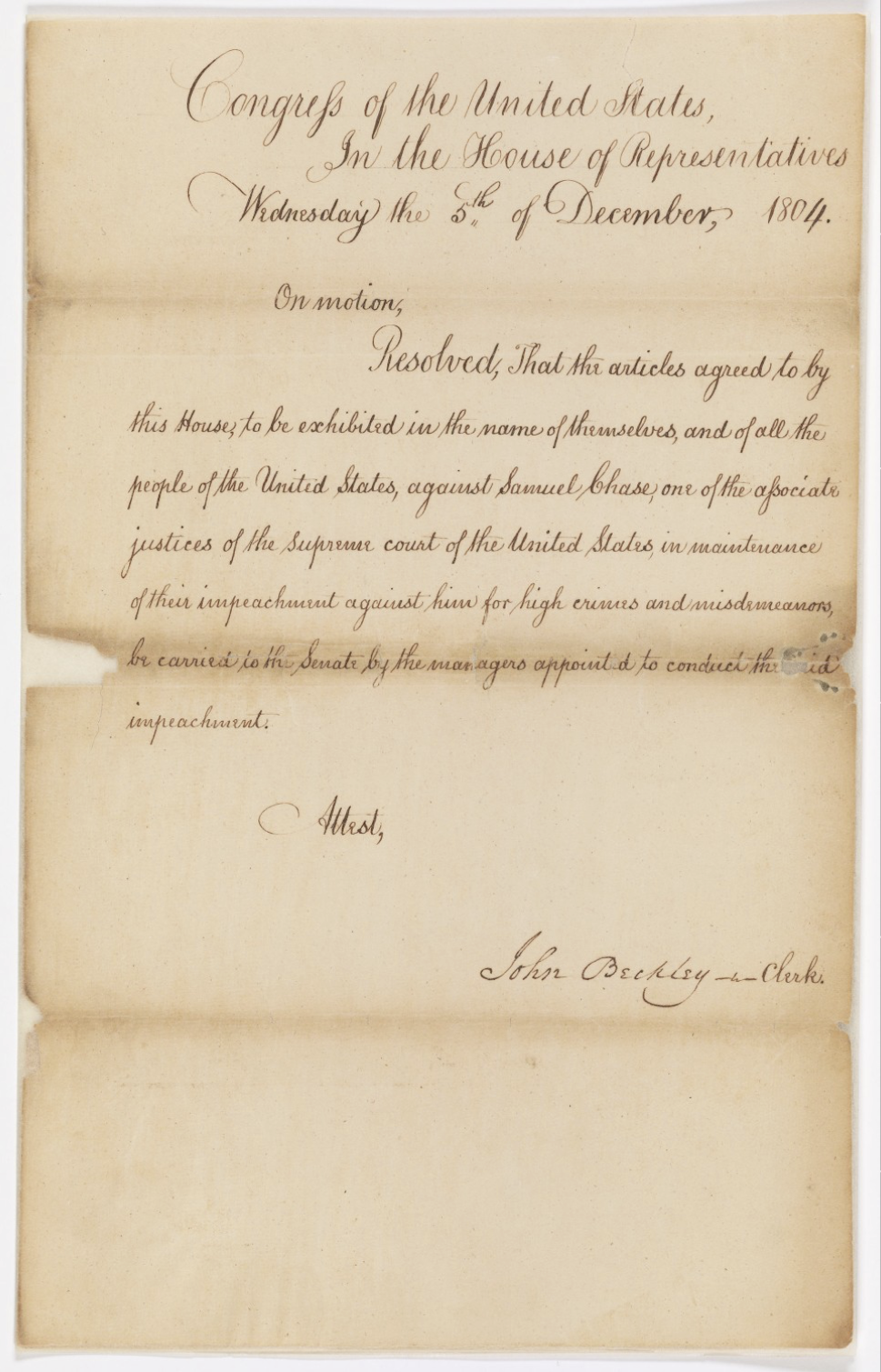
House resolution passed on December 5, 1804 ordering for the impeachment managers to carry the articles of impeachment to the Senate and display them

After the House adopted eight articles of impeachment on December 4, 1804, it considered a motion to appoint by ballot the House managers that would act as the prosecutors in the impeachment trial before the Senate. However, a vote on this motion was postponed until the following day. On December 5, the House approved the motion and voted by ballot to appoint seven house managers. On the first ballot, six individuals met the required majority of votes to be selected as managers (John Boyle, Peter Early, Roger Nelson, Joseph Hopper Nicholson, John Randolph of Roanoke, and Caesar Augustus Rodney). Thereafter, a second ballot was held to fill the final slot. Nobody received the needed majority in this round. Speaker Nathaniel Macon opined that, per a House standing rule related to such a situation on a second ballot that he believed was applicable, the individual with the greatest plurality should be considered duly elected. As George W. Campbell had the greatest plurality on the second ballot, it was Speaker Macon's opinion that Campbell was therefore duly elected the seventh impeachment manager. However, two congressmen appealed the speaker's decision, and the House voted that the Speaker Macon's decision not to be "in order". Therefore, a third ballot was held. On with ballot, Campbell received the required majority of the vote, and was therefore elected as the seventh manager. All seven members individuals were members of the Democratic–Republican party. After the election of the impeachment managers, the House approved a motion ordering for the managers to bring the articles before the Senate. After this, a motion was approved ordering for a message to be sent by the clerk of the United States House of Representatives to the Senate to notify them that the House had appointed the impeachment managers and had directed them to carry the articles to the Senate. On December 6, 1804, Roger Nelson declined his appointment to be an impeachment manager, as he would have to absent from Washington, D.C. during the trial. Nelson was replaced with Christopher H. Clark.

John Randolph of Roanoke served as the chairman and main spokesman of the impeachment managers.

House managers
Committee Chair John Randolph of Roanoke (Dem–Rep,)	John Boyle (Dem–Rep, Kentucky)	George W. Campbell (Dem–Rep, Kentucky)	Peter Early (Dem–Rep, Georgia)
Roger Nelson (Dem–Rep, Maryland)	Joseph Hopper Nicholson (Dem–Rep,)	Caesar Augustus Rodney (Dem–Rep, )	Christopher H. Clark (Dem–Rep, Virginia)

=== Defense counsel ===
Chase was defended by his counsel: Robert Goodloe Harper, Joseph Hopkinson, Charles Lee, Philip Barton Key, and Luther Martin. Martin ultimately took a leading role in the defense.

Former congressman James A. Bayard of Delaware (who had recently been unseated in a congressional election) declined a request to act as counsel to Chase. He believed that since the impeachment itself was partisan, it could actually harm Chase's case if his defense was presented by someone who had recently lost an election. Bayard would incidentally join the senate in November 1804 (being elected by a vote of the Delaware state legislature), and would vote as a senator against convicting Chase. Before his death at the hands of Burr, Hamilton had also declined to act as counsel to Chase.

== Rules of the trial ==
On November 30, 1804, in preparation for the trial, the Senate appointed Senators Abraham Baldwin, John Breckenridge, William Branch Giles, Israel Smith, and David Stone to serve on a special committee tasked with creating rules of proceedings for the Senate to use in the trial. On December 7, 1804, the rules created by this committee were reported back to the full Senate.

Nineteen rules were adopted for the trial. The rules were formally adopted by the Senate on December 24 and 31, 1804. These rules appear to have also been used for the later impeachment trials of James H. Peck and West Hughes Humphreys. After this, new rules were created ahead of the impeachment trial of Andrew Johnson. Johnson's impeachment trial could not use the rules created for Chase's impeachment, as those rules used wording specific to a trial being presided over by an officer of the Senate, while the Constitution stipulates that impeachments trials for incumbent presidents are presided over by the chief justice of the United States. However, the rules adopted for Johnson's impeachment trial were in part adapted from the rules of Chase's and earlier impeachment trials.

== Redecoration and arrangement of the Senate Chamber ==
Before the start of the pleading phase, Vice President Burr had had the Senate chamber decorated for the trial in what was described by reporters Thomas Lloyd and Samuel Harrison Smith as "a style of appropriate elegance". A semi-circular gallery was constructed in the chamber for the trial, which one Federalist senator likened to a "Roman amphitheater." Lloyd and Harrison described the arrangement of the Senate Chamber for the trial as follows,

Benches covered with crimson, on each side, and in a line with the chair of the [Vice] President, were assigned to the members of the Senate. On the right and front of the chair, a box was assigned to the [impeachment] Managers, and on the left a similar box to Mr. Chase and his counsel and chairs allotted to such friends as he might introduce. The residue of the floor was occupied with chairs for the accommodation of the members of the House of Representatives; and with boxes for representation of foreign ministers, and civil and military officers of the United States. On the right and left of the chair, at the termination of the benches of the members of the court, boxes were assigned to stenographers. The permanent gallery was allotted to the indiscriminate admission of spectators. Below this gallery, and above the floor of the House, a new gallery was raised, and fitted up with peculiar elegance, intended primarily for the exclusive accommodation of ladies. But this feature of the arrange meant made by the Vice-President, was at an early period in the trial abandoned, it having been found impractical to separate the sexes! At the termination of this gallery, on each side, boxes were specially assigned to ladies attached to the families of public characters. The preservation of order was devolved on Marshal of district of Columbia, who was assisted by a number of deputies.

The thirty-four senators sat in two rows of crimson-cloth covered benches, oriented to look towards the galleries and the area set aside for the defense and prosecution. The temporary gallery that had been erected for use by female spectators contained three rows of green cloth-covered seats. The defense and prosecution were seated in separate boxes facing the bar of the Senate containing blue cloth-covered seats.

== Start of the proceedings ==
The Senate first began impeachment trial proceedings on December 7, 1804. The articles of impeachment were carried the Senate Chamber where they were read. A summons was then issued for Justice Chase, to be returned on January 2, 1805, at which point the Justice was to answer the charges. At approximately 2pm on January 3, 1805, the court was opened by proclamation. An oath was administered to Vice President Burr. Burr then administered an oath to the senators. This was with the exception of Senators George Logan, Samuel Maclay, and William Plumer who were instead administered an affirmation. This was also with the exception of Senators James A. Bayard, William Cocke, John Gaillard, and David Stone, who were not present. No members of the House of Representatives were present on this day, including the absence of the House impeachment managers. Vice President Burr, as presiding officer, declared that he had received a letter from the defended which contained an affidavit attesting that he needed further time to prepare for the trial. The affidavit was then read. The Senate then voted to extend the date by which they were to receive an answer and proceed with the trial to February 4, 1805 and to notify the House of Representatives and Samuel Chase of this extension.

== Pleading phase ==
On February 4, 1805, at approximately 9:45am, the court was opened by proclamation with all members of the Senate in attendance and with Vice President Burr presiding. The Senate Chamber was filled with spectators. Oaths were administered to Senators Bayard, Cocke, Gaillard, and Stone, all who had not been present when oaths were previously administered to senators. It was then ordered that the secretary of the United States Senate give notice to the House that the Senate was convened in their public chamber, prepared to proceed with the trial, and that seats were provided in the chamber for the accommodation of the House's members. The House impeachment managers, several minutes later, accompanied by other members of the House entered the chamber to take their seats. Chase and his legal counsel then appeared. Chase moved for permission to read his answer to the impeachment court, and the Senate agreed by a vote to allow him to. Chase then proceeded to read his answer. Chase's response was more than 100 pages. He read it for a length reported to be either two and one-half hours or three and a half hours.

Originally, when Chase had entered the chamber's box, the sergeant at arms of the United States Senate brought a chair to Chase. However, Burr ordered that this chair be removed, believing that the chamber should mimic the English criminal trial practice in which prisoners were made to stand "in the dock". Chase, however, asked to be allowed to use a chair due to his ill health. Chase was sixty-four years old and suffered from gout. After this request was made, Burr allowed for a chair to be provided for Chase to use.

In his answer, Chase denied having committed any crime or misdemeanor. Chase addressed the charges, explaining his conduct in the Fries and Callender trials and the New Castle grand jury. For example, in response to the third article, he argued that John Taylor's testimony, "was inconclusive, immaterial, and inadmissible." He also argued that errors in rulings were not a grounds for removal from office. He outright refuted the eighth charge. In response to the Baltimore grand jury-related allegations, he argued that making a mistake in political expression should not be criminalized, remarking that otherwise, "a party in power, under this pretext, [might] destroy any judge who might happen...to say something capable of being construed by them into a political opinion adverse to their own system."

After Chase's answer was read, Randolph requested for the House managers be given time to prepare a response, which was delivered days later on February 9, 1805.

== Argument phase ==
In the argument phase, the two sides called many witnesses, with 52 in total providing testimony. The trial was suspended on February 13 so that the certification of the Electoral College vote of the 1804 presidential election, in which Jefferson was reelected, could be held. Chase was not subject to any direct questioning during the argument phase.

=== Prosecution's presentation ===
List of witnesses called during the prosecution's presentation (in the order that they first testified)
  - William Lewis, former federal judge
  - Alexander J. Dallas, former reporter of Decisions of the U.S. Supreme Court
  - Edward Tilghman
  - William S. Biddle
  - William Rawle, former U.S. attorney for Pennsylvania
  - George Hay, lawyer
  - John Taylor
  - John Thomson Mason, attorney general of Maryland
  - James Triplet
  - John Heath, Virginia politician
  - John Ballet
  - Edmund Randolph, former U.S. secretary of state, former U.S. attorney general, former governor of Virginia, former attorney general of Virginia
  - George Read Jr., U.S. attorney for Delaware
  - James Lea
  - John Montgomery, Maryland politician
  - Samuel Harrison Smith, newspaper publisher
  - John Shephen
  While the prosecution had summoned William Wirt and he had made himself available to testify, they ultimately did not call him to the stand. The prosecution had also unsuccessfully sought to summon Risdon Bishop, John Crow, Aquila Hall, Thomas Hall, John Harvie, Merewether Jones, Philip N. Nicholas, James Pleasants, Philip Stewart. Nicholas instead was called to the stand by the prosecution during the defense's presentation.

The argument phase of the trial began on February 9, 1805. The prosecution went first, giving their presentation over five days. 18 witnesses were brought to the stand to provide sworn testimony about Chase's conduct related to the articles of impeachment. The case presented by the prosecution was twofold. They argued that impeachment was a process through which the Senate was allowed to remove officers such as Chase at their own prerogative, and no grounds were therefore required to be proven in the impeachment trial. They alternatively, for those unconvinced by this, presented other argument aimed at proving that Chase had committed content that constituted a high crime or misdemeanor worthy of removal from office.

Peter Early provided the opening remarks of the prosecution's presentation. This was followed by a lengthy and detailed presentation by George W. Campbell espousing a Jeffersonian perspective on federal impeachment. Campbell argued,

Impeachment, according to the meaning of the constitution, may fairly be considered a kind of inquest into the conduct of an officer, merely as it regards his office; the manner in which he performs the duties thereof; and the affects [sic] that his conduct therein may have on society...more in the nature of a civil investigation than of a criminal prosecution.

Campbell then outlined the actions of Chase in question in the trial, giving particularly focus on his conduct during the Callander trial. Campbell's remarks stretched over two days. His speech has been described as "dull and confused", and the Senate Chamber was sparsely attended by spectators during his remarks. In the early part of the prosecution's presentation, both Early and Campbell each gave remarks that addressed several of the articles of impeachment. Early's remarks, however, largely summarized the testimony of the prosecution's witnesses. Early alleged that the only conclusion one could reasonably draw from Chase's judicial errors, given Chase's high education, was that he had permitted a personal "thirst for punishment" to get in the way of impartial justice. Early also declared, "[S]urely we shall not be asked for proofs of corrupt intent...in such a case as the one now under consideration, the answer is that the criminal intent is apparent upon the face of the act." Campbell discussed the legal theories championed by the prosecution and also argued that it was important there be an apolitical judiciary, charging Chase with misusing his judicial position to advance his own political beliefs. Campbell argued that Chase's, "justiciar authority was prostituted to party purposes." Campbell also argued that political grand jury charges were unreconcilable with the ideal of judicial independent as they tarnished the impartiality of judges.

After Early and Campbell, Christopher H. Clark spoke briefly. His remarks were focused on the fifth and sixth articles, which pertained to the Callender trial.

=== Defense's presentation ===
List of witnesses called during the defense's presentation (in the order that they first testified)
  - Edward Johnson Coale, lawyer
  - William Tuckey Meredith, lawyer
  - Luther Martin, American founding father
  - James Winchester, military officer and statesman
  - William Marshall
  - David M. Randolph
  - John Marshall, American founding father and chief justice of the United States
  - Edmund Jennings Lee I
  - John A. Chevalier
  - Robert Gamble
  - Philip Gooch
  - David Robertson
  - William Rawle, attorney
  - Gunning Bedford Jr., American founding father and judge of the U.S. District Court of Delaware
  - Nicholas Vandyke
  - Archibald Hamilton, Delaware judge
  - John Hall
  - Samuel P. Moore
  - John Montgomery, Maryland politician
  - William H. Winder, lawyer
  - Thomas Chafe
  - Philip Moore
  - Walter Dorsey, Maryland judge
  - John Purviance
  - Nicholas Brice
  - J. P. Boyd
  - William McMechin
  - William Govane
  - John Campbell
  - William Cranch
  - Thomas Hall
  - George Hay, lawyer
  - Philip N. Nicholas
  - Philip Stewart (testified in favor of the prosecution during the defense's presentation)
  Additionally, the defense had unsuccessfully summoned Cyrus Griffin (unable to testify due to illness); John C. Barret (who died before being able to testify); as well as John Hopkins, William Minor, Samuel Wheeler (all of whom were unable to be found in order to be summoned)

In the defense's presentation, which took four days, it was argued that the constitution only intended impeachment to be for charges related to accusations of a civil officer having committed an indictable crime. It began with remarks by Robert Goodloe Harper on February 15, 1805. The defense called 32 witnesses in their presentation.

Joseph Hopkinson argued an interpretation of the Constitutional prescription for impeachment being allowed for 'treason, bribery, or other high crimes and misdemeanors' that, under the constitution, "No judge can be impeached and removed from office for any act or offense for which he could not be indicted." He argued that Congress could not, on their own accord, decide what constituted impeachable conduct, but rather, had to heed this interpretation of the Constitution. He declared that while the House of impeachment, "had the power of impeachment", that, "what they are to impeach in what cases they may exercise this delegated power depends on...the Constitution, and not on their opinion, whim, or caprice." He outlined an argument for the value of an independent judiciary, and further argued that removal for the circumstances that Chase was being impeached for would undermine judicial independence, asking,

[I]f a judge is forever to be exposed to prosecutions and impeachment for his official conduct, on mere suggestions of caprice, and to be condemned by the mere voice of prejudice...can he hold that firm and steady hand his high functions required?

On February 19, 1805, during the defense's presentation, Burr granted Chase permission to cease personal attendance at the trial as Chase began to suffer a painful case of gout.

After Joseph Hopkinson's presentation, Philip Barton Key and Charles Lee next spoke on February 22, 1805. On February 23, 1805, Luther Martin spoke. In his remarks, Luther Martin, who had been a delegate to United States Constitutional Convention himself, declared,

The principle I have endeavored to establish is that no judge or other officer can, under the Constitution of the United States, be removed from office but by impeachment, and for the violation of some law, which the violation must not simply be a crime or misdemeanor, but a high crime or misdemeanor.

Martin defended Chase's conduct in the Fries trial and the Callender trial. Martin defended some of the specific behavior of Chase's that had been under attack by the prosecution. He justified Chase's judicial conduct in the Callender trial, including examining the Sedition law that was in question itself. Martin conceded that Chase had, occasionally, been overly influenced by his personal emotions, but argued that this behavior was,

Rather a violation of the principles of politeness, than of the principles of law; rather the want of decorum than the commission of a high crime and misdemeanor.

Martin argued that impeachment was being used in a partisan manner, which threatened the integrity of the judiciary by placing it under discipline by a political party.

=== Closing remarks ===
The closing remarks began on February 20, 1805, and lasted for eight days. During the closing remarks, the House impeachment managers spoke both first and last, with the defense giving remarks in between.

Robert Goodloe Harper gave the closing remarks of the defense's presentation. In his remarks, he argued,

An impeachment is not a mere inquiry, in the nature of an inquest of office, whether an officer be qualified for his place, or whether some reason of policy or expediency may not demand his removal, but a criminal prosecution, for the support of which the proof of some willful violation of a known law of the land is known to be indispensably required.

Harper also brought attention to the impeachment managers' approach of presenting contradictory arguments: first arguing that they needed to prove nothing, then proceeding to try to present proof of an impeachable crime. He argued that, on one hand the managers at once, argued, "that this is a merely a question of policy and expedience," and also cited, "legal authorities, both English and American, for the purpose of explaining the doctrine of impeachment, and of proving that the acts alleged against the respondent amount to impeachable offenses". This is a criticism that was never directly responded to by the impeachment managers.

Nicholson, Randolph, and Rodney gave the closing remarks for the prosecution. Despite being sick the day before and having lost his prepared notes, Randolph personally spoke for two and one-half hours in the closing remarks.

Randolph argued, "[Chase] stands charged with having sinned against his law and against his sacred oath, by acting in his judicial capacity unfaithfully, partially, and with respect to persons."

The Senate thereafter resolved to reconvene on March 1, 1805 as a court of impeachment to give their judgement.

== Verdict ==
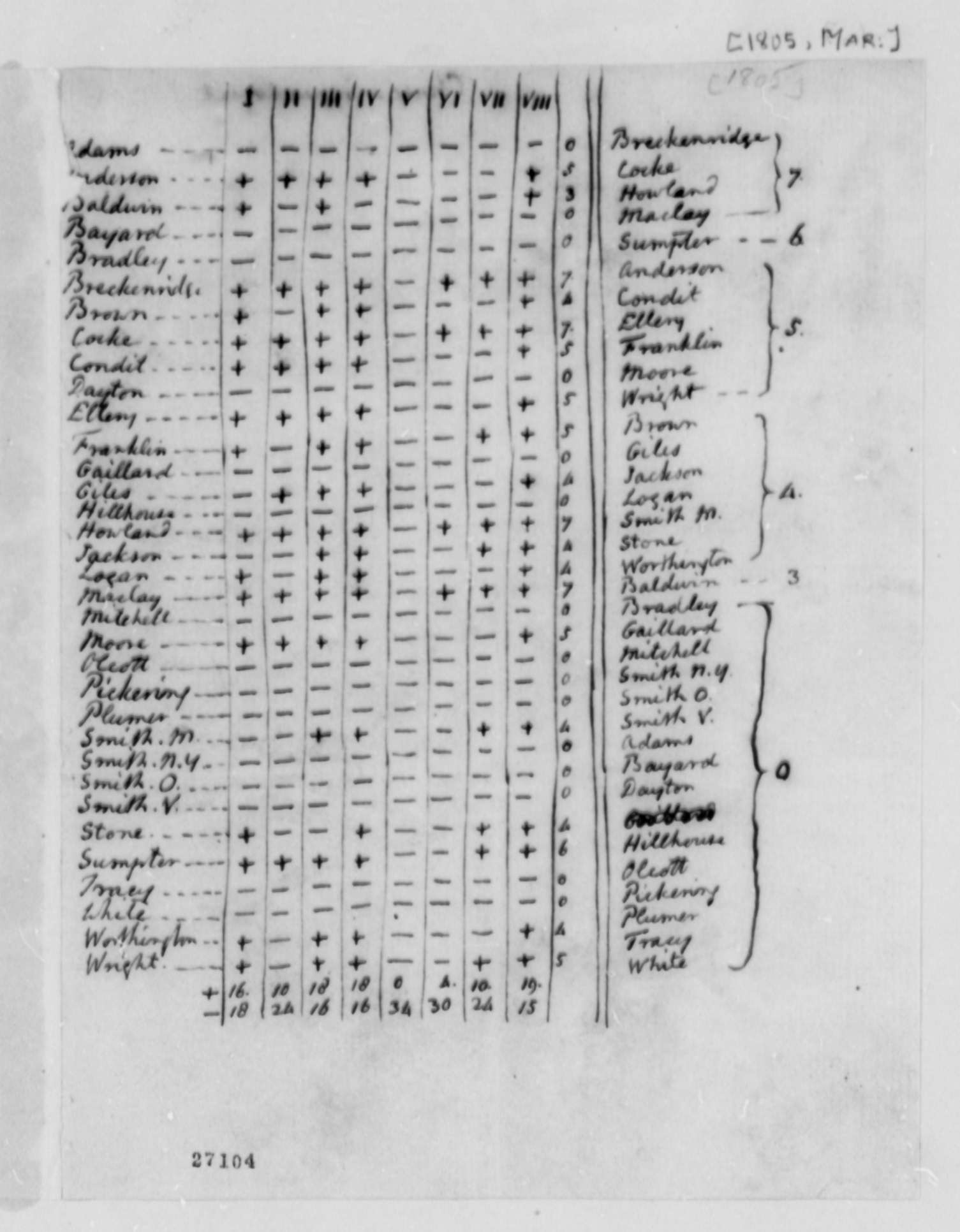
Tally of the verdict

The Senate convened on March 1, 1805 to vote on verdicts for each of the articles. The galleries of the Senate were filled with many spectators who witnessed the Senate's deliberations.

With 25 members, the Democratic–Republicans had enough votes on their own to hypothetically convict Chase. However, the Senate voted to acquit Chase of all charges, with each articles seeing at least six Democratic–Republican senators joining all Federalist senators in voting to acquit.

There were 34 senators (25 Democratic-Republicans and 9 Federalists). Therefore, with all senators voting, 23 "guilty" votes were needed to reach the required two-thirds majority for conviction/removal from office. Ultimately, the article that received the most guilty votes (Article VIII) still fell four votes short of a two-thirds majority for conviction.

The vote on a verdict began at 12:30pm. For each vote, Vice President Burr individually asked each senator in a roll call vote, "Mr. _____, how say you; is the respondent, Samuel Chase, guilty or not guilty of a high crime or misdemeanor as charged in the _____ article of impeachment?" The Senators each responded by casting a vote of either "guilty" or "not guilty".

After the voting concluded, Burr recited each count before declaring,

Hence it appears that there is not a constitutional majority of votes binding Samuel Chase, Esquire, guilty on any one article. It therefore, becomes my duty to declare that Samuel Chase, Esquire, stands acquitted of all the articles exhibited by the House of Representatives against him.

No senator made any floor remarks to the Senate explaining the reasons for their vote. This differs from more modern U.S. federal impeachment trials, in which senators often deliver speeches after the close of the trial.

Articles of Impeachment, U.S. Senate judgment (A two-thirds "guilty" margin necessary for a conviction)
March 1, 1805 Article I	Party		Total votes
March 1, 1805 Article I	Federalist	Democratic-Republican	Total votes
Yea (guilty)	0	16	16
Nay (not guilty)	9	9	18
March 1, 1805 Article II	Party		Total votes
March 1, 1805 Article II	Federalist	Democratic-Republican	Total votes
Yea (guilty)	0	10	10
Nay (not guilty)	9	15	24
March 1, 1805 Article III	Party		Total votes
March 1, 1805 Article III	Federalist	Democratic-Republican	Total votes
Yea (guilty)	0	18	18
Nay (Not guilty)	9	7	16
March 1, 1805 Article IV	Party		Total votes
March 1, 1805 Article IV	Federalist	Democratic-Republican	Total votes
Yea (guilty)	0	18	18
Nay (Not guilty)	9	7	16
March 1, 1805 Article V	Party		Total votes
March 1, 1805 Article V	Federalist	Democratic-Republican	Total votes
Yea (guilty)	0	0	0
Nay (Not guilty)	9	25	34
March 1, 1805 Article VI	Party		Total votes
March 1, 1805 Article VI	Federalist	Democratic-Republican	Total votes
Yea (guilty)	0	4	4
Nay (Not guilty)	9	19	30
March 1, 1805 Article VII	Party		Total votes
March 1, 1805 Article VII	Federalist	Democratic-Republican	Total votes
Yea (guilty)	0	10	10
Nay (Not guilty)	9	15	24
March 1, 1805 Article VIII	Party		Total votes
March 1, 1805 Article VIII	Federalist	Democratic-Republican	Total votes
Yea (guilty)	0	19	19
Nay (Not guilty)	9	6	15
Detail of roll call: Senator / Party / State / Art. I vote / Art. II vote / Art. III vote / Art. IV vote / Art. V vote / Art. VI vote / Art. VII vote / Art. VIII vote; John Quincy Adams / F / MA / Nay / Nay / Nay / Nay / Nay / Nay / Nay / Nay; Joseph Anderson / D–R / TN / Yea / Yea / Yea / Yea / Nay / Nay / Nay / Yea; Abraham Baldwin / D–R / GA / Yea / Nay / Yea / Nay / Nay / Nay / Nay / Yea; James A. Bayard / F / DE / Nay / Nay / Nay / Nay / Nay / Nay / Nay / Nay; Stephen R. Bradley / D–R / VT / Nay / Nay / Nay / Nay / Nay / Nay / Nay / Nay; John Breckinridge / D–R / KY / Yea / Yea / Yea / Yea / Nay / Yea / Yea / Yea; John Brown / D–R / KY / Yea / Nay / Yea / Yea / Nay / Nay / Nay / Yea; William Cocke / D–R / TN / Yea / Yea / Yea / Yea / Nay / Yea / Yea / Yea; John Condit / D–R / NJ / Yea / Yea / Yea / Yea / Nay / Nay / Nay / Yea; Jonathan Dayton / F / NJ / Nay / Nay / Nay / Nay / Nay / Nay / Nay / Nay; Christopher Ellery / D–R / RI / Yea / Yea / Yea / Yea / Nay / Nay / Nay / Yea; Jesse Franklin / D–R / NC / Yea / Nay / Yea / Yea / Nay / Nay / Yea / Yea; John Gaillard / D–R / SC / Nay / Nay / Nay / Nay / Nay / Nay / Nay / Nay; William Branch Giles / D–R / VA / Nay / Yea / Yea / Yea / Nay / Nay / Nay / Yea; James Hillhouse / F / CT / Nay / Nay / Nay / Nay / Nay / Nay / Nay / Nay; Benjamin Howland / D–R / RI / Yea / Yea / Yea / Yea / Nay / Yea / Yea / Yea; James Jackson / D–R / GA / Nay / Nay / Yea / Yea / Nay / Nay / Yea / Yea; George Logan / D–R / PA / Yea / Nay / Yea / Yea / Nay / Nay / Nay / Yea; Samuel Maclay / D–R / PA / Yea / Yea / Yea / Yea / Nay / Yea / Yea / Yea; Samuel L. Mitchill / D–R / NY / Nay / Nay / Nay / Nay / Nay / Nay / Nay / Nay; Andrew Moore / D–R / VA / Yea / Yea / Yea / Yea / Nay / Nay / Nay / Yea; Simeon Olcott / F / NH / Nay / Nay / Nay / Nay / Nay / Nay / Nay / Nay; Timothy Pickering / F / MA / Nay / Nay / Nay / Nay / Nay / Nay / Nay / Nay; William Plumer / F / NH / Nay / Nay / Nay / Nay / Nay / Nay / Nay / Nay; Israel Smith / D–R / VT / Nay / Nay / Nay / Nay / Nay / Nay / Nay / Nay; John Smith / D–R / NY / Nay / Nay / Nay / Nay / Nay / Nay / Nay / Nay; John Smith / D–R / OH / Nay / Nay / Nay / Nay / Nay / Nay / Nay / Nay; Samuel Smith / D–R / MD / Nay / Nay / Yea / Yea / Nay / Nay / Yea / Yea; David Stone / D–R / NC / Yea / Nay / Nay / Yea / Nay / Nay / Yea / Yea; Thomas Sumter / D–R / SC / Yea / Yea / Yea / Yea / Nay / Nay / Yea / Yea; Uriah Tracy / F / CT / Nay / Nay / Nay / Nay / Nay / Nay / Nay / Nay; Samuel White / F / DE / Nay / Nay / Nay / Nay / Nay / Nay / Nay / Nay; Thomas Worthington / D–R / OH / Yea / Nay / Yea / Yea / Nay / Nay / Nay / Yea; Robert Wright / D–R / MD / Yea / Nay / Yea / Yea / Nay / Nay / Yea / Yea; Sources:

== Aftermath ==
=== Immediate aftermath ===
Chase remained on the court until his June 1811 death. The acquittal of Chase handed a political defeat to Thomas Jefferson. Jefferson would have possibly moved next to impeach Chief Justice John Marshall had the Senate convicted Chase.

The failure of the Democratic–Republicans in the United States Congress to remove Chase followed the failure of the Democratic–Republicans to remove all three Federalist justices of the Pennsylvania Supreme Court (Edward Shippen IV and Thomas Smith, Jasper Yeates) that had been similarly impeached on political grounds on March 23, 1804 Democratic–Republican-led Pennsylvania House of Representatives but acquitted in their impeachment trial before the Pennsylvania Senate in the vote held on January 28, 1805. Not willing to surrender defeat, some Democratic–Republicans in both the federal government and state judiciaries turned their attention to amending their constitutions. John Randolph of Roanoke appeared on the House floor the very afternoon to propose and amendment to the United States Constitution that would allow the president, upon the request of both Houses of congress, to remove any federal judge. Joseph Hopper Nicholson proposed a Constitutional amendment that would allow for state legislatures to recall (remove) senators for any reason. In the Pennsylvania state legislature, amendments to the state constitution were proposed that would allow judges to be removed by a simple majority vote, make the threshold for an impeachment conviction a simple majority, and have judges hold terms of years rather than lifetime appointments. A major issue of the 1805 Pennsylvania gubernatorial election would be the prospect of a holding a state constitutional convention.

=== Legacy ===
Chase is the only U.S. Supreme Court justice that has ever been impeached. The impeachment trial raised constitutional questions over the nature of the judiciary and was the end of a series of efforts to define the appropriate extent of judicial independence under the Constitution. It set the unofficial limits of the impeachment power, fixed the concept that the judiciary was prohibited from engaging in partisan politics, defined the role of the judge in a criminal jury trial, and clarified judicial independence. The construction was largely attitudinal, as it modified political norms without codifying new legal doctrines.

The acquittal of Chase (by lopsided margins on several of the counts) set an unofficial precedent that many historians say helped ensure the independence of the judiciary. Historian Adam A. Perlin has opined that the House-appointed impeachment managers sought to expand the ability of Congress to, "create offenses at their will and pleasure," and argued that a conviction of Chase would have led to Congress being able to remove judges for purely political purposes. Chief Justice William Rehnquist noted in his book Grand Inquests that some senators declined to convict Chase despite their partisan hostility to him, apparently because they doubted that the mere quality of his judging was grounds for removal. All impeachments of federal judges since Chase have been based on allegations of legal or ethical misconduct, not on judicial performance. For their part, federal judges since that time have generally been much more cautious than Chase in trying to avoid the appearance of political partisanship. While the impeachment trial was a major event at the time it took place, it has since been relegated to relative historical obscurity in both the general public consciousness and even in terms of scholarly coverage.
