= Justice Dorsey =

Justice Dorsey may refer to:

- Thomas Beale Dorsey (1780–1855), associate justice of the Maryland Court of Appeals
- Walter Dorsey (1771–1823), associate justice of the Maryland Court of Appeals

== See also ==
- Judge Dorsey (disambiguation)
