= Judge Dorsey =

Judge Dorsey may refer to:

- Jennifer A. Dorsey (born 1971), judge of the United States District Court for the District of Nevada
- Peter Collins Dorsey (1931–2012), judge of the United States District Court for the District of Connecticut

== See also ==
- Justice Dorsey (disambiguation)
