= SS Samuel Chase =

Liberty ship of WWII

History

United States
- Name: Samuel Chase
- Namesake: Samuel Chase
- Owner: War Shipping Administration (WSA)
- Operator: American-Hawaiian Steamship Co.
- Ordered: as type (EC2-S-C1) hull, MCE hull 23
- Awarded: 14 March 1941
- Builder: Bethlehem-Fairfield Shipyard, Baltimore, Maryland
- Cost: $1,236,111
- Yard number: 2010
- Way number: 10
- Laid down: 12 September 1941
- Launched: 22 February 1942
- Sponsored by: Mrs. Lester E. Voss
- Completed: 11 April 1942
- Identification: Call sign: KBYU
- Fate: Laid up in the National Defense Reserve Fleet, Wilmington, North Carolina, 14 June 1948; Sold for scrapping, 19 January 1967, withdrawn from fleet, 26 January 1967

General characteristics
- Class & type: Liberty ship; type EC2-S-C1, standard
- Tonnage: 10,865 LT DWT; 7,176 GRT
- Displacement: 3,380 long tons (3,434 t) (light); 14,245 long tons (14,474 t) (max)
- Length: 441 feet 6 inches (135 m) oa; 416 feet (127 m) pp; 427 feet (130 m) lwl
- Beam: 57 feet (17 m)
- Draft: 27 ft 9.25 in (8.4646 m)
- Installed power: 2 × Oil fired 450 °F (232 °C) boilers, operating at 220 psi (1,500 kPa); 2,500 hp (1,900 kW)
- Propulsion: 1 × triple-expansion steam engine, (manufactured by General Machinery Corp., Hamilton, Ohio); 1 × screw propeller
- Speed: 11.5 knots (21.3 km/h; 13.2 mph)
- Capacity: 562,608 cubic feet (15,931 m^{3}) (grain); 499,573 cubic feet (14,146 m^{3}) (bale)
- Complement: 38–62 USMM; 21–40 USNAG
- Armament: Varied by ship; Bow-mounted 3-inch (76 mm)/50-caliber gun; Stern-mounted 4-inch (102 mm)/50-caliber gun; 2–8 × single 20-millimeter (0.79 in) Oerlikon anti-aircraft (AA) cannons and/or, 2–8 × 37-millimeter (1.46 in) M1 AA guns

SS Samuel Chase was a Liberty ship built in the United States during World War II. She was named after Founding Father Samuel Chase, an Associate Justice of the United States Supreme Court and a signatory to the United States Declaration of Independence as a representative of Maryland.

== Construction ==
Samuel Chase was laid down on 12 September 1941, under a Maritime Commission (MARCOM) contract, MCE hull 23, by the Bethlehem-Fairfield Shipyard, Baltimore, Maryland; she was sponsored by Mrs. Lester E. Voss, the wife of the resident plant engineer at the Bethlehem-Fairfield Shipyard, and was launched on 22 February 1942.

== History ==
She was allocated to American-Hawaiian Steamship Co., on 11 April 1942. On 14 June 1948, she was laid up in the National Defense Reserve Fleet, Wilmington, North Carolina. She was sold for scrapping on 19 January 1967, to Northern Metal Co., for $46,000. She was removed from the fleet, 26 January 1967.

== Bibliography ==
- "Bethlehem-Fairfield, Baltimore MD". www.ShipbuildingHistory.com. 14 August 2008.
- Maritime Administration. "Samuel Chase". Ship History Database Vessel Status Card. U.S. Department of Transportation, Maritime Administration.
- Davies, James (May 2004). "Specifications (As-Built)" (PDF). p. 23.
- "SS Samuel Chase".
