= Walter Dorsey =

American judge (1771–1823)

Walter Dorsey (March 17, 1771 – July 31, 1823) was a Maryland politician and judge who served as a justice of the Maryland Court of Appeals from 1817 to 1823.

== Career ==
Born in Maryland to Colonel John Dorsey and Mary Hammond Dorsey, Dorsey was elected to the Maryland House of Delegates representing St. Mary's County, Maryland, in 1794, and returned to that body representing the city of Baltimore in 1797. On February 9, 1800, he was appointed chief judge of the Court of Oyer and Terminer for Baltimore City and County. He served on the Governor's Council from 1812 to 1813, and as a judge of the Court of Appeals from his appointment on March 14, 1817 until his death in August, 1823.

In the mid-to-late 1810s, Dorsey established a private law school in Baltimore, and by the time of his death, it was described as a "large and successful law school", such that when David Hoffman was appointed professor of law at the University of Maryland in 1814, he was unable to begin lecturing immediately due to the competition provided by Dorsey's program.

== Personal life and death ==
On July 8, 1795, Dorsey married Hopewell Hebb, with whom he had eight children. Dorsey died in Philadelphia at the age of 52.

Political offices
Preceded by Joseph Hopper Nicholson	Judge of the Maryland Court of Appeals; 1817–1823	Succeeded by Stevenson Archer
