= Samuel Chase =

Founding Father of the United States (1741–1811)

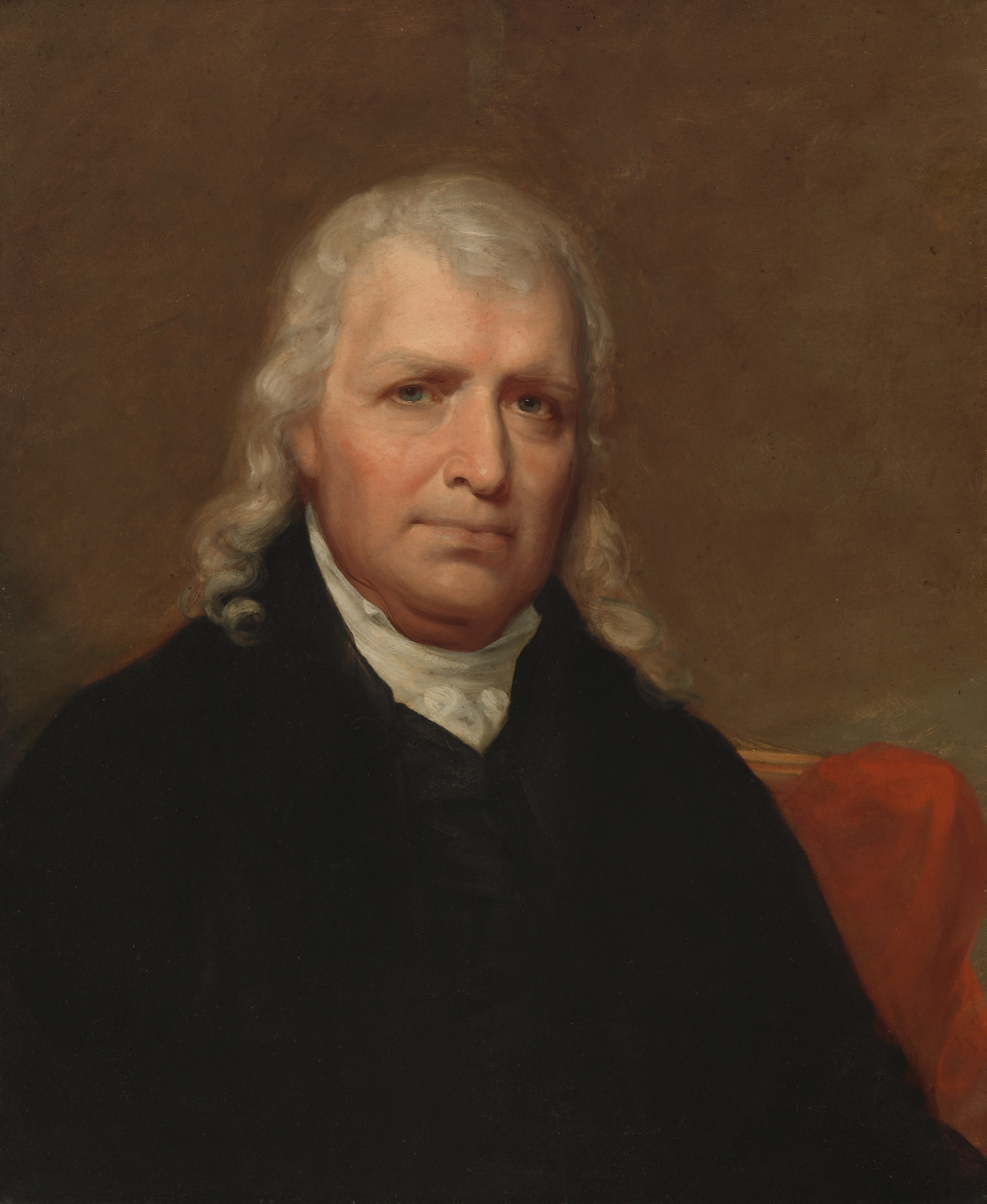
- Portrait by John Wesley Jarvis in the National Portrait Gallery collection, 1811

Associate Justice of the Supreme Court of the United States
- In office February 4, 1796 – June 19, 1811
- Nominated by: George Washington
- Preceded by: John Blair
- Succeeded by: Gabriel Duvall

Member of the Maryland General Assembly
- In office 1765–1785

Personal details
- Born: April 17, 1741 Somerset County, Maryland, British America
- Died: June 19, 1811 (aged 70) Baltimore, Maryland, U.S.
- Party: Federalist
- Spouses: Anne Baldwin (m. 1762; died 1776) Hannah Kilty (m. 1784)
- Children: 9
- Nickname(s): Old Bacon Face; Demosthenes of Maryland

Samuel Chase (April 17, 1741 – June 19, 1811) was a Founding Father of the United States, signer of the Continental Association and United States Declaration of Independence as a representative of Maryland, and Associate Justice of the United States Supreme Court. In 1804, Chase was impeached by the House of Representatives on grounds of letting his partisan leanings affect his court decisions, but was acquitted the following year by the Senate and remained in office. He is the only United States Supreme Court Justice to have ever been impeached.

Born near Princess Anne, Maryland, Chase established a legal practice in Annapolis, Maryland. He served in the Maryland General Assembly for several years and favored independence during the American Revolution. He won election to the Continental Congress before serving on the Baltimore District Criminal Court and the Maryland General Court. In 1796, President George Washington appointed Chase to the United States Supreme Court.

After the 1800 elections, President Thomas Jefferson and the Democratic-Republicans sought to weaken Federalist influence on the federal courts. Chase's actions on the court had been accused of demonstrating bias, and Jefferson believed that Chase should be removed from office, a process that required a vote in both the Senate and the House of Representatives. The House passed eight articles of impeachment, all centering on Chase's alleged political bias. The Senate voted to acquit Chase on all counts, and Chase served on the Supreme Court until his death in 1811. Some historians have argued that Chase's acquittal set an important precedent regarding the independence of the federal judiciary.

== Early life ==
Coat of Arms of Samuel Chase

Samuel Chase was the son of the Reverend Thomas Chase (c. 1703–1779) and his wife, Matilda Walker (1705–1741), born near Princess Anne, Maryland. His father was a clergyman who immigrated to Somerset County to become a priest in a new church. Samuel was educated at home. He was eighteen when he left for Annapolis where he studied law under attorney John Hall. He was admitted to the bar in 1761 and started a law practice in Annapolis. It was during his time as a member of the bar that his colleagues gave him the nickname of "Old Bacon Face", either due to his proneness for a facial flush when angered or excited or due to his general ruddy complexion in general, or both.

In May 1762, Chase married Anne Baldwin, daughter of Thomas and Agnes Baldwin. Samuel and Anne had three sons and four daughters, with only four surviving to adulthood. Anne died in 1776. In 1784, Chase traveled to England to deal with Maryland's Bank of England stock, where he met Hannah Kilty, daughter of Samuel Giles, a Berkshire physician. They were married later that year and had two daughters, Hannah and Elisa.

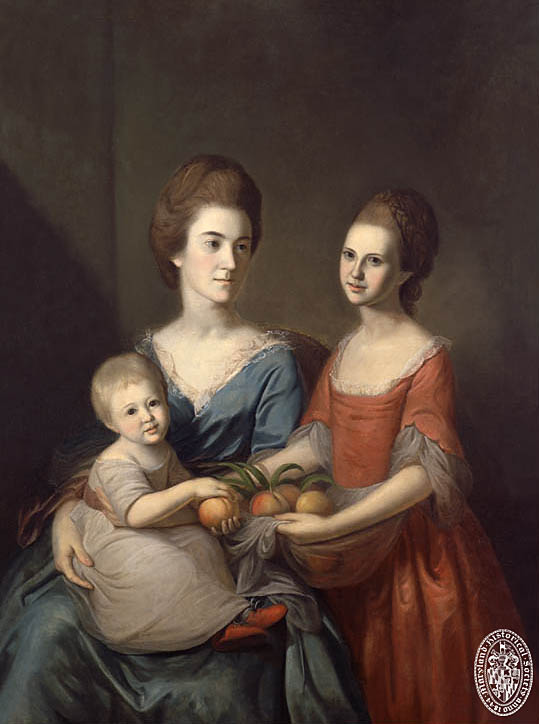
Anne Baldwin Chase and her daughters Anne and Matilda Chase

== Political career ==
In 1764, Chase was elected to the Maryland General Assembly where he served for 20 years.

In 1766, he became embroiled in a war of words with a number of loyalist members of the Maryland political establishment. In an open letter dated July 18, 1766, Chase attacked Walter Dulany, George Steuart (1700–1784), John Brice (1705–1766), and others for publishing an article in the Maryland Gazette Extraordinary of June 19, 1766, in which Chase was accused of being: "a busy, reckless incendiary, a ringleader of mobs, a foul-mouthed and inflaming son of discord and faction, a common disturber of the public tranquility". In his response, Chase accused Steuart and the others of "vanity...pride and arrogance", and of being brought to power by "proprietary influence, court favour, and the wealth and influence of the tools and favourites who infest this city."

In 1769, he started construction of the mansion that would become known as the Chase–Lloyd House, which he sold unfinished in 1771. The house is now a National Historic Landmark. He co-founded Anne Arundel County's Sons of Liberty chapter with his close friend William Paca, as well as leading opposition to the 1765 Stamp Act.

From 1774 to 1776, Chase was a member of the Annapolis Convention. He served on Maryland's Council of Safety in 1775. He represented Maryland at the Continental Congress, was re-elected in 1776 and signed the United States Declaration of Independence. He remained in the Continental Congress until 1778. Chase was elected to the 1788 Maryland Ratifying Convention to ratify the proposed 1787 Constitution. In the Convention, Chase was a prominent Anti-Federalist, though despite his efforts Maryland became the seventh state to ratify.

== Judicial career ==
In 1786, Chase moved to Baltimore, which remained his home for the rest of his life. In 1788, he was appointed chief justice of the District Criminal Court in Baltimore and served until 1796. In 1791, he became Chief Justice of the Maryland General Court, again serving until 1796. On January 26, 1796, President George Washington nominated Chase as an associate justice of the Supreme Court of the United States; the U.S. Senate confirmed his appointment the following day. Chase was sworn into office on February 4, 1796, and served on the Court until his death on June 19, 1811.

=== Impeachment ===
President Thomas Jefferson, alarmed at the seizure of power by the judiciary through the claim of exclusive judicial review, led his party's efforts to remove the Federalists from the bench. His allies in Congress had, shortly after his inauguration, repealed the Judiciary Act of 1801, abolishing the lower courts created by the legislation and terminating their Federalist judges despite lifetime appointments; Chase, two years after the repeal in May 1803, had denounced it in his charge to a Baltimore grand jury, saying that it would "take away all security for property and personal liberty, and our Republican constitution will sink into a mobocracy." Earlier in April 1800, Chase, acting as a district judge, had made strong attacks upon Thomas Cooper, who had been indicted under the Alien and Sedition Acts; Chase had taken the air of a prosecutor rather than a judge. Also in 1800, when a grand jury in New Castle, Delaware declined to indict a local printer, Chase refused to discharge them, saying he was aware of one specific printer whom he wished them to indict for seditious behavior. Jefferson saw the attack as indubitable bad behavior and an opportunity to reduce the Federalist influence on the judiciary by impeaching Chase, launching the process from the White House when he wrote to Congressman Joseph Hopper Nicholson of Maryland, asking: "Ought the seditious and official attack [by Chase] on the principles of our Constitution . . .to go unpunished?"

On March 12, 1804, the House voted 73 to 32 to impeach Chase. The House of Representatives voted on December 4, 1804 to adopt eight articles of impeachment, one of which involved Chase's handling of the trial of John Fries. Two more focused on his conduct in the political libel trial of James Callender. One article covered Chase's conduct with the New Castle grand jury, charging that he "did descend from the dignity of a judge and stoop to the level of an informer by refusing to discharge the grand jury, although entreated by several of the said jury so to do." Three articles focused on procedural errors made during Chase's adjudication of various matters, and an eighth was directed at his "intemperate and inflammatory … peculiarly indecent and unbecoming … highly unwarrantable … highly indecent" remarks while "charging" or authorizing a Baltimore grand jury. The United States Senate—controlled by the Jeffersonian Democratic-Republicans—began the impeachment trial of Chase on February 9, 1805, with Vice President Aaron Burr presiding and Virginia Representative John Randolph leading the prosecution.

All the counts involved Chase's work as a trial judge in lower circuit courts. (In that era, Supreme Court justices had the added duty of serving as individuals on circuit courts, a practice that was ended in the late 19th century.) The heart of the allegations was that political bias had led Chase to treat defendants and their counsel in a blatantly unfair manner. Chase's defense lawyers called the prosecution a political effort by his Republican enemies. In answer to the articles of impeachment, Chase argued that all of his actions had been motivated by adherence to precedent, judicial duty to restrain advocates from improper statements of law, and considerations of judicial efficiency.

The Senate voted to acquit Chase of all charges on March 1, 1805. There were 34 senators present (25 Democratic-Republicans and 9 Federalists), and 23 votes were needed to reach the required two-thirds majority for conviction/removal from office. Of the eight votes taken, the closest vote was 18 for conviction/removal from office and 16 for acquittal in regards to the Baltimore grand jury charge. He is the only U.S. Supreme Court justice to have been impeached. Judge Alexander Pope Humphrey recorded in the Virginia Law Register an account of the impeachment trial and acquittal of Chase.

The impeachment raised constitutional questions over the nature of the judiciary and was an important point in series of efforts to define the appropriate extent of "judicial independence" in America, especially with regard to the Supreme Court and Constitution. It set de facto limits on the impeachment power, fixed the concept that the judiciary was prohibited from openly engaging in partisan politics in the same way, defined the role of the judge in a criminal jury trial, and clarified judicial "independence". The construction was largely attitudinal, as it modified political norms without their explicit codification.

The acquittal of Chase—by lopsided margins on several counts—set an unofficial precedent that many historians say helped ensure the so-called independence of the judiciary. As Chief Justice William Rehnquist noted in his book Grand Inquests, some senators declined to convict Chase despite their partisan hostility to him, apparently because they doubted that the mere "quality" of his judging was grounds for removal. All impeachments of federal judges since Chase have been based on allegations of legal or ethical misconduct, not on judicial performance. For their part, federal judges were generally much more cautious than Chase in trying to avoid the appearance of political partisanship.

== Death and legacy ==
Samuel Chase died of a heart attack in 1811. He was interred in what is now Baltimore's Old Saint Paul's Cemetery. The World War II Liberty Ship SS Samuel Chase was named in his honor.

== See also ==
- List of justices of the Supreme Court of the United States
- Memorial to the 56 Signers of the Declaration of Independence

Legal offices
Preceded by John Blair	Associate Justice of the Supreme Court of the United States; 1796–1811	Succeeded by Gabriel Duvall
