= Juror's oath =

Oath taken by jurors at the beginning of jury selection or trial

A juror's oath is used to swear in jurors at the beginning of jury selection or trial.

== Australia ==
In a New South Wales juror's oath, the juror promises to "...well and truly try and true deliverance make between our Sovereign Lady the Queen [or the King] and the accused whom you shall have in charge, and a true verdict give according to the evidence."

In Western Australia each juror has a choice to either "swear by Almighty God" or "solemnly and sincerely declare and affirm" to "give a true verdict according to the evidence upon the issue(s) to be tried by me."

In Queensland each juror has a choice for an Oath or Affirmation. The Oath is as follows:

You will conscientiously try the charges and decide them according to evidence. You will not disclose anything about the Jury's deliberations other than as allowed or required by law. So help you God.

The Affirmation is as follows:

Do you solemnly, sincerely and truly affirm and declare that you will conscientiously try the charges against the Defendant, and you will decide them according to the evidence. You will also not disclose anything about the Jury's deliberation other than as required by law.

== Canada ==
In Canada, each juror has the choice to take either an oath or affirmation. The oath/affirmation states something to the effect of:

Do you swear to well and truly try and true deliverance make between our sovereign lady the Queen, and the accused at the bar, who you shall have in charge, and a true verdict give, according to the evidence, so help you God?

In the case of an affirmation, "swear" is replaced with "affirm", and "so help you God" is omitted.

== France ==
In French criminal procedure the role of judge and jury is different than in common law countries. A jury has a part only in the most serious cases, and the judges and jury together decide verdict and sentence. According to the French Code of Criminal Procedure, the judge says:

Do you swear and promise to examine with the most scrupulous attention the charges that will be laid against [the defendant]; to betray neither the interests of the defendant, nor the interests of the society that accuses him, nor the interests of the victim; not to communicate with anybody until you [declare your verdict]; not to listen to hatred, malice, fear or affection; to remember that the defendant is presumed to be innocent and that doubt must benefit him; to decide for yourself according to the charges and the means of defense, according to your conscience and intimate conviction, with the impartiality and firmness that befits an honest and free person, and to keep the secret of the deliberations, even after you cease to be a juror.

Each juror must respond "I so swear".

== New Zealand ==
A New Zealand juror's oath reads: "Members of the jury: Do each of you swear by Almighty God (or solemnly, sincerely, and truly declare and affirm) that you will try the case before you to the best of your ability and give your verdict according to the evidence?"

== United Kingdom ==
In England and Wales, and Northern Ireland the Oaths Act 1978 applies to jurors' oaths (Part II of the act also applies to Scotland). The person may opt either to swear an oath on the New Testament—or, for Jews, the Old Testament—or to affirm. Oaths can be "administered in any lawful manner" to persons who are neither Christian nor Jews. For example, other faiths may be sworn in on a holy book of their choice, such as the Verdas for Hindus and the Koran for Muslims.

The affirmation was first made available to Quakers and Moravians, who had conscientious objections to oaths, extended by the Quakers and Moravians Act 1838, and later further extended to anybody who chooses to do so.

The oath starts "I swear by almighty God/by Allah/by Waheguru/on the Gita"; for an affirmation the wording is "I solemnly, sincerely and truly declare and affirm". This is followed in both cases by "that I will faithfully try the defendant and give a true verdict according to the evidence."

== United States ==
In the United States, a federal juror's oath usually states something to the effect of, "Do you and each of you solemnly swear that you will well and truly try and a true deliverance make between the United States and ______, the defendant at the bar, and a true verdict render according to the evidence, so help you God?"

Jury instructions sometimes make reference to the juror's oath. For example, the Criminal Pattern Jury Instructions developed by the U.S. Court of Appeals for the 10th Circuit for use by U.S. District Courts state:

You, as jurors, are the judges of the facts. But in determining what actually happened–that is, in reaching your decision as to the facts–it is your sworn duty to follow all of the rules of law as I explain them to you.

You have no right to disregard or give special attention to any one instruction, or to question the wisdom or correctness of any rule I may state to you. You must not substitute or follow your own notion or opinion as to what the law is or ought to be. It is your duty to apply the law as I explain it to you, regardless of the consequences. However, you should not read into these instructions, or anything else I may have said or done, any suggestion as to what your verdict should be. That is entirely up to you.

It is also your duty to base your verdict solely upon the evidence, without prejudice or sympathy. That was the promise you made and the oath you took.

The wording of the oath in federal court is not prescribed by statute. James Joseph Duane describes it as "simply an old tradition judges have made up."
