= Joseph Hopper Nicholson =

American judge

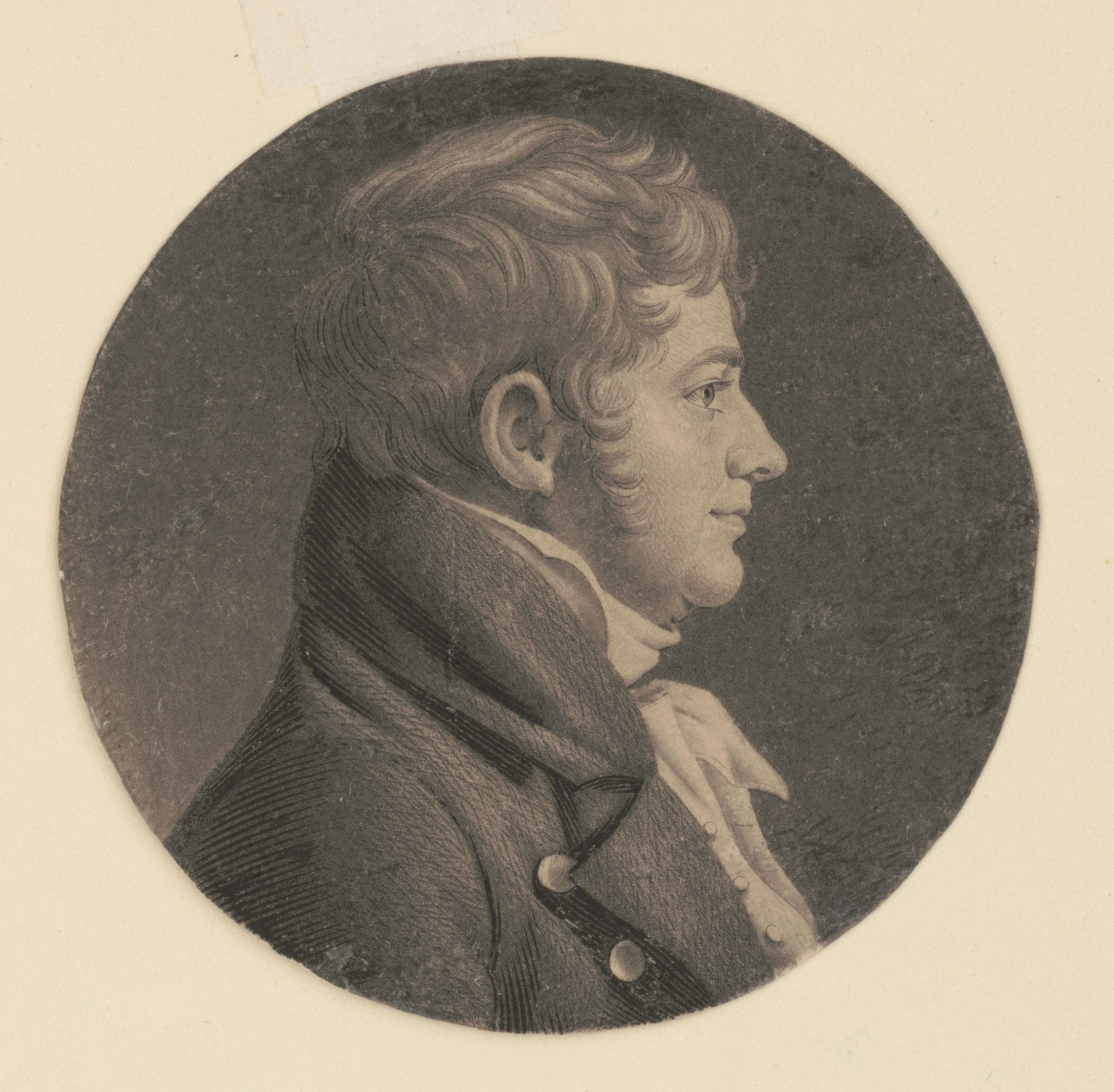
- Joseph Hopper Nicholson

Member of the U.S. House of Representatives from Maryland's 7th district
- In office March 4, 1799 – March 1, 1806
- Preceded by: Joshua Seney
- Succeeded by: Edward Lloyd V

Chief Justice of the Sixth Judicial District of Maryland
- In office March 26, 1806 – March 4, 1817

Personal details
- Born: May 15, 1770 Chestertown, Kent County, Maryland
- Died: March 4, 1817 (aged 46) Baltimore County, Maryland
- Party: Democratic-Republican
- Education: Washington College
- Occupation: Lawyer, jurist, politician

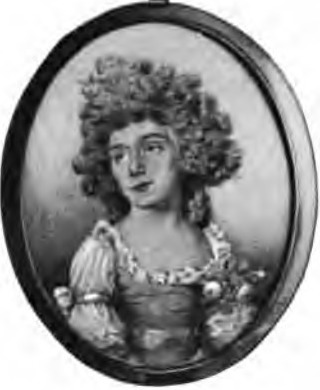
Nicholson's wife, Rebecca Lloyd Nicholson

Joseph Hopper Nicholson (May 15, 1770 – March 4, 1817) was an American lawyer, jurist, and politician from Maryland.

Born in Chestertown, Kent County, Maryland, Nicholson graduated from Washington College in 1787 and studied law. He was admitted to the bar and practiced, and also served as a member of the Maryland House of Delegates from 1796 to 1798. He was elected as a Democratic-Republican to the Sixth and to the three succeeding Congresses and served from March 4, 1799, until his resignation on March 1, 1806. In Congress, Nicholson was one of the impeachment managers appointed by the House of Representatives in January 1804 to conduct the impeachment proceedings against John Pickering, judge of the United States District Court for New Hampshire, and in December of the same year against Samuel Chase, Associate Justice of the Supreme Court of the United States. Nicholson was significantly ill in February 1801 when the House decided the Election of 1800, yet was carried on a stretcher to the Capitol to vote for Jefferson.

During the War of 1812 Nicholson participated in the defense of Fort McHenry, about which event Nicholson’s brother-in-law Francis Scott Key wrote “The Star-Spangled Banner” (initially titled “The Defense of Fort McHenry” and made the national anthem of the United States in 1931) and published the poem with encouragement from Nicholson. Nicholson served as chief justice of the sixth judicial district of Maryland and associate justice of the Maryland Court of Appeals from March 26, 1806, until his death at his home in Baltimore County, Maryland. He is interred in the family cemetery on the Lloyd estate of "Wye House" near Easton, Talbot County, Maryland.

U.S. House of Representatives
Preceded by Joshua Seney; Elect	Member of the U.S. House of Representatives from Maryland's 7th congressional district 1799–1806	Succeeded by Edward Lloyd V
