= List of elections in 1816 =

The following elections occurred in the year 1816.

- 1816 French legislative election

== North America ==
=== United States ===
- 1816 United States elections
- 1816 United States presidential election

==== United States lieutenant gubernatorial ====
- 1816 Connecticut lieutenant gubernatorial election

==== United States gubernatorial ====
- 1816 Connecticut gubernatorial election
- 1816 Delaware gubernatorial election
- 1816 Indiana gubernatorial election
- 1816 Kentucky gubernatorial election
- 1816 Louisiana gubernatorial election
- 1816 Maryland gubernatorial election
- 1816 Massachusetts gubernatorial election
- 1816 New Hampshire gubernatorial election
- 1816 New Jersey gubernatorial election
- 1816 New York gubernatorial election
- 1816 North Carolina gubernatorial election
- 1816 Ohio gubernatorial election
- 1816 Rhode Island gubernatorial election
- 1816 South Carolina gubernatorial election
- 1816 Vermont gubernatorial election
- 1816 Virginia gubernatorial election

==== United States Senate ====
- 1816 and 1817 United States Senate elections

==== United States House of Representatives ====
- 1816 and 1817 United States House of Representatives elections
- 1816 United States House of Representatives election in Delaware
- 1816 United States House of Representatives election in Georgia
- 1816 Georgia's at-large congressional district special election
- 1816 United States House of Representatives election in Illinois Territory
- 1816 United States House of Representatives election in Indiana
- 1816 United States House of Representatives elections in Kentucky
- 1816 Kentucky's 1st congressional district special election
- 1816 United States House of Representatives election in Louisiana
- 1816 United States House of Representatives elections in Maryland
- 1816 Maryland's 3rd congressional district special election
- 1816 Maryland's 5th congressional district special elections
- 1816 United States House of Representatives elections in Massachusetts
- 1816 Massachusetts's 11th congressional district special election
- 1816 Massachusetts's 12th congressional district special election
- 1816 United States House of Representatives election in Mississippi Territory
- 1816 United States House of Representatives election in Missouri Territory
- 1816 United States House of Representatives election in New Hampshire
- 1816 United States House of Representatives election in New Jersey
- 1816 United States House of Representatives elections in New York
- 1816 New York's 20th congressional district special election
- 1816 New York's 21st congressional district special election
- 1816 United States House of Representatives elections in North Carolina
- 1816 North Carolina's 6th congressional district special election
- 1816 North Carolina's 8th congressional district special election
- 1816 United States House of Representatives elections in Ohio
- 1816 Ohio's 1st congressional district special election
- 1816 United States House of Representatives elections in Pennsylvania
- 1816 Pennsylvania's 3rd congressional district special election
- 1816 Pennsylvania's 9th congressional district special election
- 1816 United States House of Representatives elections in South Carolina
- 1816 United States House of Representatives election in Vermont
- 1816 Virginia's 15th congressional district special election
- 1816 Virginia's 18th congressional district special election

== See also ==
- Category:1816 elections
