= 1816–17 United States House of Representatives elections =

House elections for the 15th U.S. Congress

- April 30, 1816 – August 14, 1817 (Note: Regular elections only)

All 184 seats in the United States House of Representatives 93 seats needed for a majority
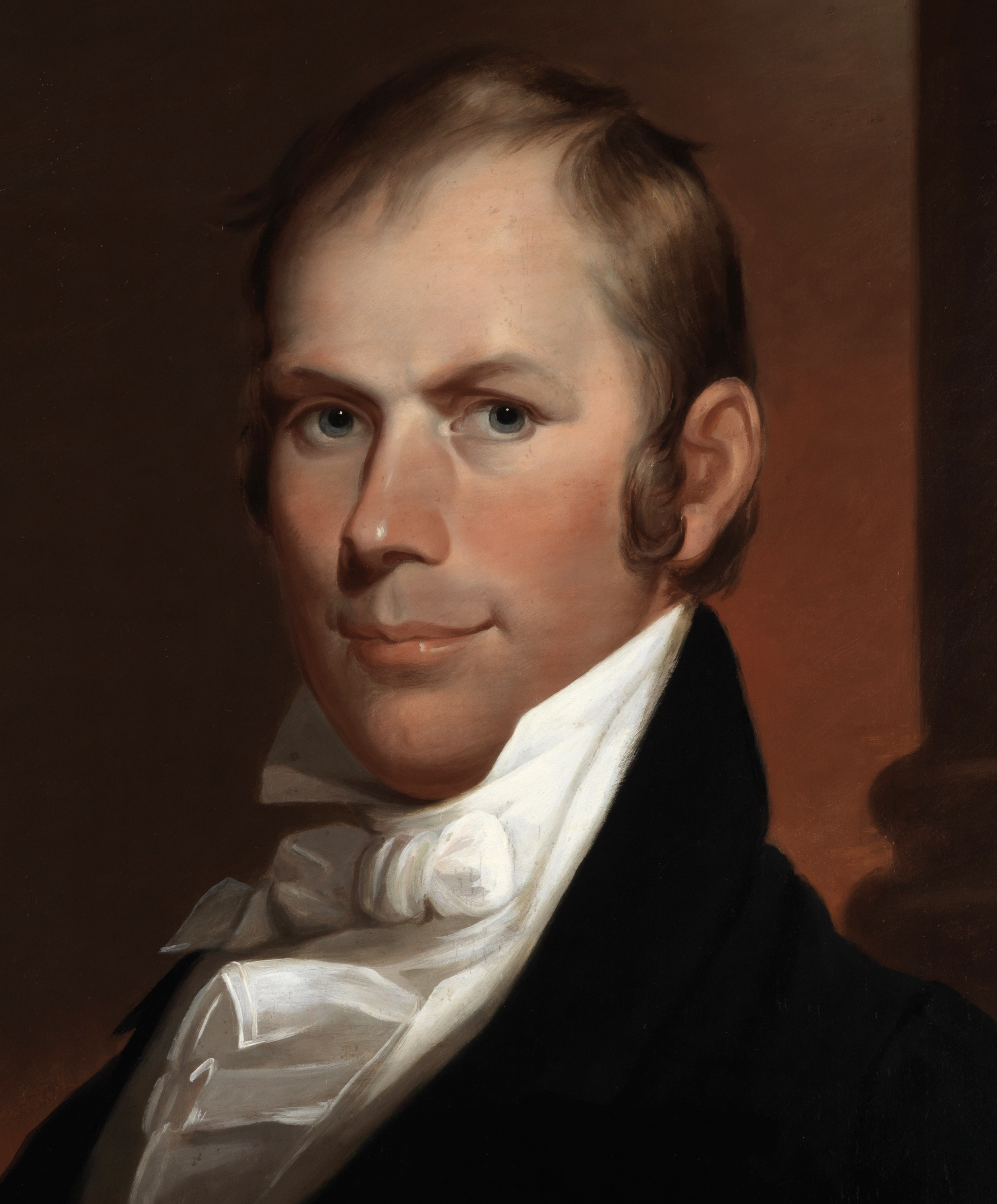

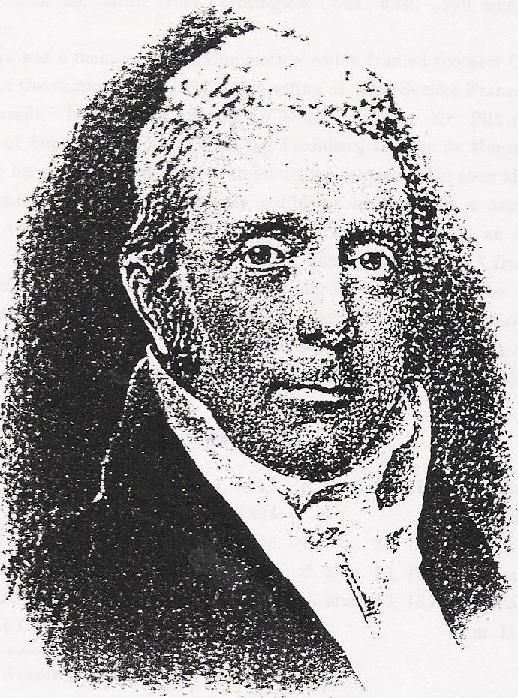
	Majority party	Minority party
Leader	Henry Clay	Timothy Pitkin
Party	Democratic-Republican	Federalist
Leader's seat	Kentucky 2nd	Connecticut at-large
Last election	119 seats	64 seats
Seats won	144 (Note: Figures are at variance with both Dubin (p. 62, which includes "140 Republicans, 1 Independent Republican, and 2 vacancies", in addition to "41 Federalists"), and Martis (p. 84) and "Party Divisions of the House of Representatives* ▌1789–Present". Office of the Historian, House of United States House of Representatives. (which both report 146 Democrat-Republicans, and 39 Federalists). But Dubin appears to incorrectly list Lewis Williams of NC-13 as a "Federalist" (see pg. 60 and 55, etc.) instead of a "Democrat-Republican", while Martis lists Philemon Beecher of OH-05 as a "Democrat-Republican" instead of a "Federalist", which if accounted for would revise both Dubin's and Martis's totals to 40 Federalists (and therefore 144 Democrat-Republicans).)	40
Seat change	▲25	▼24
Speaker before election
Henry Clay
Democratic-Republican
Elected Speaker
Henry Clay
Democratic-Republican

The 1816–17 United States House of Representatives elections were held on various dates in various states between April 30, 1816, and August 14, 1817. Each state set its own date for its elections to the House of Representatives before the first session of the 15th United States Congress convened on December 1, 1817. The size of the House increased to 184 after Indiana and Mississippi achieved statehood.

The Democratic-Republican Party entered the election with a large majority, yet made sizable gains, helping trigger the virtually nonpartisan Era of Good Feelings under new President James Monroe, elected in 1816.

Two major events combined to help eliminate the declining Federalist Party from meaningful contention. First, the War of 1812 had concluded in 1815 with a feeling of national pride and relief, with the small American military fighting the much more powerful British forces to a draw punctuated by General Andrew Jackson's dramatic victory at the Battle of New Orleans. Federalists had opposed the risky but ultimately successful war, with some New England Federalists advocating radical measures at the Hartford Convention. Second, the 1815 eruption of Mount Tambora in present-day Indonesia, itself the most powerful in recorded history and following other major eruptions, temporarily disrupted global climate. The effects severely damaged the agricultural economy of New England, where Federalist support was strongest, causing privation, popular discontent, and mass emigration westward.

== Election summaries ==
Mississippi was admitted as a state in 1817 during the 15th Congress, adding one seat.

↓
144	40
Democratic-Republican	Federalist

State	Type	Date	Total seats	Democratic- Republican		Federalist	
State	Type	Date	Total seats	Seats	Change	Seats	Change
New York	Districts	April 30 – May 2, 1816	27	22	▲1	5	▼1
Louisiana	At-large	July 1–3, 1816	1	1	Steady	0	Steady
Kentucky	Districts	August 5, 1816	10	10	Steady	0	Steady
New Hampshire	At-large	August 26, 1816	6	6	▲6	0	▼6
Rhode Island	At-large	August 27, 1816	2	0	Steady	2	Steady
Vermont	At-large	September 3, 1816	6	6	▲6	0	▼6
Connecticut	At-large	September 16, 1816	7	0	Steady	7	Steady
Maryland	Districts	October 6, 1816	9	5	▲1	4	▼1
Delaware	At-large	October 7, 1816	2	1	▲1	1	▼1
Georgia	At-large	October 7, 1816	6	6	Steady	0	Steady
Ohio	Districts	October 8, 1816	6	5	▼1	1	▲1
Pennsylvania	Districts	October 8, 1816	23	19	▲1	4	▼1
South Carolina	Districts	October 14–15, 1816	9	9	▲1	0	▼1
Massachusetts	Districts	November 4, 1816 (Note: A majority was required for election, which was not met in the initial election for 5 districts requiring additional trials to be held on January 27, May 1, July 21, September 29, and December 1, 1817.)	20	9	▲7	11	▼7
New Jersey	At-large	November 4–5, 1816	6	6	Steady	0	Steady
Late elections (after the March 4, 1817 beginning of the term)
Virginia	Districts	April 1817	23	20	▲1	3	▼1
Indiana	At-large	August 4, 1817	1	1	Steady	0	Steady
Mississippi	At-large	August 4–5, 1817	1	1	▲1	0	Steady
Tennessee	Districts	August 7–8, 1817	6	6	Steady	0	Steady
North Carolina	Districts	August 14, 1817	13	11	Steady	2	Steady
Total			184	144 78.3%	▲25	40 21.7%	▼24

House seats
Dem-Republican	78.26%
Federalist	21.74%

== Special elections ==
There were special elections in 1816 and 1817 to the 14th United States Congress and 15th United States Congress.

Special elections are sorted by date then district.

=== 14th Congress ===
District	Incumbent			This race	
District	Member	Party	First elected	Results	Candidates (Note: Only candidates with at least 1% of the vote listed.)
North Carolina 6	Nathaniel Macon	Democratic- Republican	1791	Incumbent resigned December 15, 1815 when elected U.S. Senator. New member elected January 22, 1816 and seated February 7, 1816. Democratic-Republican hold. Winner was later re-elected to the next term; see below.	▌ ✓ Weldon Edwards (Democratic-Republican) 60.7%; ▌William P. Little (Unknown) 39.3%
Maryland 5 (Seat A)	Nicholas R. Moore	Democratic- Republican	1803; 1810 (lost); 1812	Incumbent resigned in 1815. New member elected January 27, 1816 and seated February 4, 1816. Democratic-Republican hold. Winner was later re-elected to the next term; see below.	▌ ✓ Samuel Smith (Democratic-Republican) 70.1%; ▌Peter Little (Democratic-Republican) 29.8%
New York 21	Peter B. Porter	Democratic- Republican	1808; 1812 (retired); 1814	Incumbent resigned January 23, 1816; New member elected April 30 – May 2, 1816 and seated December 2, 1816. Democratic-Republican hold. Winner was not elected to the next term; see below.	▌ ✓ Archibald S. Clarke (Democratic-Republican); ▌Daniel W. Lewis (Federalist) 41.3%
North Carolina 5	William R. King	Democratic- Republican	1810	Incumbent resigned, effective November 4, 1816. New member elected before August 16, 1816, and seated December 2, 1816. Democratic-Republican hold. Winner lost re-election to the next term; see below.	▌ ✓ Charles Hooks (Democratic-Republican); "Rev. S. Stanford"; "by a majority of 343 votes"
North Carolina 8	Richard Stanford	Democratic- Republican	1796	Incumbent died April 16, 1816. New member elected before August 22, 1816, and seated December 2, 1816. Democratic-Republican hold. Winner lost re-election to the next term; see below.	▌ ✓ Samuel Dickens (Democratic-Republican) 52.2%; ▌John Craig (Democratic-Republican) 47.8%
New York 20	Enos T. Throop	Democratic- Republican	1814	Incumbent resigned June 4, 1816 after losing re-election. New member elected August 27–29, 1816 and seated December 3, 1816. Democratic-Republican hold. Winner was not elected to the next term; see below.	▌ ✓ Daniel Avery (Democratic-Republican) 52.8%; ▌Charles Kellogg (Democratic-Republican) 45.2%
Maryland 5 (Seat B)	William Pinkney	Democratic- Republican	1790; 1791 (Resigned); 1814	Incumbent resigned April 18, 1816 to become Minister to Russia. New member elected September 3, 1816 and seated December 2, 1816. Democratic-Republican hold. Winner was later re-elected to the next term; see below.	▌ ✓ Peter Little (Democratic-Republican) 54.4%; ▌Tobias Stansbury (Democratic-Republican) 45.6%
Maryland 3	Alexander C. Hanson	Federalist	1812	Incumbent resigned after being elected to the Senate. New member elected October 6, 1816 and seated December 2, 1816. Federalist hold. Winner also elected to the next term; see below.	▌ ✓ George Peter (Federalist) 45.5%; ▌Charles Kilgour (Federalist) 30.9%; ▌Nicholas Snethen (Democratic-Republican) 23.5%
Ohio 1	John McLean	Democratic- Republican	1812	Incumbent resigned in April 1816 after being appointed to the Supreme Court of Ohio. New member elected October 8, 1816 and seated December 2, 1816. Democratic-Republican hold. Winner also elected to the next term; see below.	▌ ✓ William H. Harrison (Democratic-Republican) 58.6%; ▌Thomas R. Ross (Democratic-Republican) 31.0%; ▌William C. Schenck (Federalist) 6.1%; ▌William Corry (Federalist) 1.9%; ▌Matthias Ross (Democratic-Republican) 1.6%
Pennsylvania 9	Thomas Burnside	Democratic- Republican	1815 (special)	Incumbent resigned in April 1816 to accept judicial appointment. New member elected October 8, 1816 and seated December 3, 1816. Democratic-Republican hold. Winner also elected to the next term; see below.	▌ ✓ William P. Maclay (Democratic-Republican); [data missing]
Virginia 18	Thomas Gholson Jr.	Democratic- Republican	1808 (special)	Incumbent died July 4, 1816. New member elected October 10–28, 1816 and seated December 4, 1816. Democratic-Republican hold.	▌ ✓ Thomas M. Nelson (Democratic-Republican); [data missing]
South Carolina 9 "Sumter or Camden district"	William Mayrant	Democratic- Republican	1814	Incumbent resigned October 21, 1816, having just lost re-election. New member elected November 25 & 26, 1816 and seated January 2, 1817. Democratic-Republican hold. Winner also won the general election; see below.	▌ ✓ Stephen Decatur Miller (Democratic-Republican)
Georgia at-large	Alfred Cuthbert	Democratic- Republican	1813 (special); 1814	Incumbent resigned November 9, 1816. New member elected in December 1816 and seated January 23, 1817. Democratic-Republican hold.	▌ ✓ Zadock Cook (Democratic-Republican) 39.5%; ▌Thomas U. P. Charlton (Unknown) 38.3%; ▌Moore (Unknown) 12.6%; ▌Walker (Unknown) 9.6%
Kentucky 1	James Clark	Democratic- Republican	1812	Incumbent resigned April 8, 1816 when appointed circuit court judge. New member elected in 1816 and seated December 2, 1816. Democratic-Republican hold. Winner was not elected to the next term; see below.	▌ ✓ Thomas Fletcher (Democratic-Republican); [data missing]
Massachusetts 11	Elijah Brigham	Federalist	1810	Incumbent died February 22, 1816. New member elected in 1816 and seated December 2, 1816. Federalist hold.	▌ ✓ Benjamin Adams (Federalist); [data missing]
Virginia 23	John Clopton	Democratic- Republican	1795; 1799 (lost); 1801	Incumbent died September 11, 1816; New member elected in 1816 and seated December 17, 1816. Democratic-Republican hold.	▌ ✓ John Tyler (Democratic-Republican); ▌Andrew Stevenson (Democratic-Republican); ▌John Clopton Jr. (Democratic-Republican)

=== 15th Congress ===
District	Incumbent			This race	
District	Member / Delegate	Party	First elected	Results	Candidates
Pennsylvania 10	David Scott	Democratic- Republican	1816	Incumbent resigned to become president and judge of the court of common pleas. New member elected October 14, 1817 and seated with the rest of the House December 1, 1817. Democratic-Republican hold.	▌ ✓ John Murray (Democratic-Republican) 71.0%; ▌Abram Light (Federalist) 29.0%
Connecticut at-large 2 seats on a general ticket	Sylvanus Backus	Federalist	1816	Member-elect died February 15, 1817. New member elected in 1817 and seated with the rest of the House December 1, 1817. Federalist hold.	▌ ✓ Ebenezer Huntington (Federalist) 29.2%; ▌ ✓ Nathaniel Terry (Federalist) 22.5%; ▌Sylvester Gilbert (Federalist) 16.7%; ▌Lyman Law (Federalist) 12.0%; ▌Lewis B. Sturges (Federalist) 9.8%; ▌Epaphroditus Champion (Federalist) 6.7%; ▌Asa Bacon Jr. (Federalist) 3.2%
Connecticut at-large 2 seats on a general ticket	Charles Dennison	Federalist	1816	Member-elect declined the seat. New member elected in 1817 and seated with the rest of the House December 1, 1817. Federalist hold.	▌ ✓ Ebenezer Huntington (Federalist) 29.2%; ▌ ✓ Nathaniel Terry (Federalist) 22.5%; ▌Sylvester Gilbert (Federalist) 16.7%; ▌Lyman Law (Federalist) 12.0%; ▌Lewis B. Sturges (Federalist) 9.8%; ▌Epaphroditus Champion (Federalist) 6.7%; ▌Asa Bacon Jr. (Federalist) 3.2%
New York 4	Henry B. Lee	Democratic- Republican	1816	Member-elect died February 18, 1817. New member elected in 1817 and seated with the rest of the House December 1, 1817. Democratic-Republican hold.	▌ ✓ James Tallmadge Jr. (Democratic-Republican) 47.7%; ▌Lemuel Clift (Federalist) 38.5%; ▌Abraham Adriance (Democratic-Republican) 13.8%
Missouri Territory at-large	John Scott	Democratic- Republican	1816	Incumbent's re-election declared illegal and seat vacated since March 4, 1817. Incumbent re-elected in 1817 and seated August 4, 1817.	▌ ✓ John Scott (Democratic-Republican); [data missing]

== Connecticut ==
Connecticut elected its members September 16, 1816.

District	Incumbent			This race	
District	Member	Party	First elected	Results	Candidates
Connecticut at-large 7 seats on a general ticket	Benjamin Tallmadge	Federalist	1801 (special)	Incumbent retired. Federalist hold. Successor (Backus) died February 15, 1817, leading to a special election.	▌ ✓ Sylvanus Backus (Federalist) 13.7%; ▌ ✓ Samuel B. Sherwood (Federalist) 9.0%; ▌ ✓ Charles Dennison (Federalist) 8.9%; ▌ ✓ Timothy Pitkin (Federalist) 8.8%; ▌ ✓ Thomas Scott Williams (Federalist) 7.1%; ▌ ✓ Jonathan O. Moseley (Federalist) 7.0%; ▌ ✓ Uriel Holmes (Federalist) 6.7%; ▌Ebenezer Huntington (Federalist) 6.6%; ▌Lyman Law (Federalist) 6.4%; ▌Lewis B. Sturges (Federalist) 6.2%; ▌Epaphroditus Champion (Federalist) 5.9%; ▌Asa Bacon Jr. (Federalist) 5.4%; ▌Nathaniel Terry (Federalist) 4.4%; ▌Sylvester Gilbert (Democratic-Republican) 4.2%
Connecticut at-large 7 seats on a general ticket	Epaphroditus Champion	Federalist	1806	Incumbent lost-re-election. Federalist hold.	
Connecticut at-large 7 seats on a general ticket	Lewis B. Sturges	Federalist	1805 (special)	Incumbent lost-re-election. Federalist hold. Successor (Dennison) declined to serve, leading to a special election.	
Connecticut at-large 7 seats on a general ticket	Timothy Pitkin	Federalist	1805 (special)	Incumbent re-elected.	
Connecticut at-large 7 seats on a general ticket	John Davenport	Federalist	1798	Incumbent retired. Federalist hold.	
Connecticut at-large 7 seats on a general ticket	Jonathan O. Moseley	Federalist	1804	Incumbent re-elected.	
Connecticut at-large 7 seats on a general ticket	Lyman Law	Federalist	1810	Incumbent lost-re-election. Federalist hold.	

== Delaware ==
Delaware elected its members October 7, 1816.

District	Incumbent			This race	
District	Member	Party	First elected	Results	Candidates
Delaware at-large 2 seats on a general ticket	Thomas Clayton	Federalist	1814	Incumbent lost-re-election. Federalist hold.	▌ ✓ Louis McLane (Federalist) 24.0%; ▌ ✓ Willard Hall (Democratic-Republican) 23.6%; ▌Caesar A. Rodney (Democratic-Republican) 23.5%; ▌Caleb Rodney (Federalist) 23.0%; ▌Thomas Clayton (Federalist) 3.3%; ▌Thomas Cooper (Federalist) 2.6%
Delaware at-large 2 seats on a general ticket	Thomas Cooper	Federalist	1812	Incumbent lost-re-election. Democratic-Republican gain.	▌ ✓ Louis McLane (Federalist) 24.0%; ▌ ✓ Willard Hall (Democratic-Republican) 23.6%; ▌Caesar A. Rodney (Democratic-Republican) 23.5%; ▌Caleb Rodney (Federalist) 23.0%; ▌Thomas Clayton (Federalist) 3.3%; ▌Thomas Cooper (Federalist) 2.6%

== Georgia ==
Georgia elected its members October 7, 1816.

District	Incumbent			This race	
District	Member	Party	First elected	Results	Candidates
Georgia at-large 6 seats on a general ticket	Wilson Lumpkin	Democratic-Republican	1814	Incumbent lost-re-election. Democratic-Republican hold.	▌ ✓ William Terrell (Democratic-Republican) 10.9%; ▌ ✓ Joel Crawford (Democratic-Republican) 10.5%; ▌ ✓ Joel Abbot (Democratic-Republican) 9.6%; ▌ ✓ Zadock Cook (Democratic-Republican) 8.4%; ▌ ✓ Thomas W. Cobb (Democratic-Republican) 8.2%; ▌ ✓ John Forsyth (Democratic-Republican) 7.9%; ▌John Dooly (Unknown) 7.3%; ▌Richard Henry Wilde (Democratic-Republican) 7.0%; ▌Homer Virgil Milton (Unknown) 6.8%; ▌Wilson Lumpkin (Democratic-Republican) 6.8%; ▌Alfred Cuthbert (Democratic-Republican) 6.4%; ▌Allen Daniel (Unknown) 6.3%; ▌Thomas Telfair (Democratic-Republican) 2.3%; ▌James Wood (Unknown) 1.6%
Georgia at-large 6 seats on a general ticket	Richard Henry Wilde	Democratic-Republican	1814	Incumbent lost-re-election. Democratic-Republican hold.	
Georgia at-large 6 seats on a general ticket	Bolling Hall	Democratic-Republican	1810	Incumbent retired. Democratic-Republican hold.	
Georgia at-large 6 seats on a general ticket	Zadock Cook	Democratic-Republican	1816 (special)	Incumbent re-elected.	
Georgia at-large 6 seats on a general ticket	Thomas Telfair	Democratic-Republican	1812	Incumbent lost-re-election. Democratic-Republican hold.	
Georgia at-large 6 seats on a general ticket	John Forsyth	Democratic-Republican	1812	Incumbent re-elected.	

== Illinois Territory ==
See Non-voting delegates, below.

== Indiana ==
Indiana elected its member August 4, 1817, having just elected him just the year before to the new seat.

=== 14th Congress ===
Congress passed enabling legislation permitting the Indiana Territory to write a constitution in 1816. Delegates to the constitutional convention met in Corydon, Indiana, from June 10 to June 29, after which the first state elections took place in August. Congress formally approved the Constitution of Indiana on December 11, nine days after Indiana's representative was seated by the United States House of Representatives.

District	Incumbent			This race	
District	Member	Party	First elected	Results	Candidates
Indiana at-large	None (new state)			New seat. Nonpartisan/Democratic- Republican gain. (Note: Indiana politics was formally nonpartisan before the 1830s. Dubin counts Hendricks as a Democratic-Republican during his tenure.)	▌ ✓ William Hendricks (Nonpartisan/D-R) 80.25%; ▌Allen D. Thom (Nonpartisan) 19.74%; ▌George R. C. Sullivan (Nonpartisan) 0.00%

=== 15th Congress ===
District	Incumbent			This race	
District	Member	Party	First elected	Results	Candidates
Indiana at-large	William Hendricks	Nonpartisan/ Democratic- Republican	1816	Incumbent re-elected.	▌ ✓ William Hendricks (Nonpartisan/D-R) 60.10%; ▌Thomas Posey (Nonpartisan) 39.90%

== Kentucky ==
Kentucky elected its members August 5, 1816.

District	Incumbent			This race	
District	Member	Party	First elected	Results	Candidates
Kentucky 1	James Clark	Democratic- Republican	1812	Incumbent resigned April 8, 1816 when appointed circuit court judge. Democratic-Republican hold. Successor was not elected to finish the current term.	▌ ✓ David Trimble (Democratic-Republican) 55.3%; ▌George Stockton (Unknown) 44.7%
Kentucky 2	Henry Clay	Democratic- Republican	1810; 1814 (resigned); 1814; 1815 (seat declared vacant); 1815 (special)	Incumbent re-elected.	▌ ✓ Henry Clay (Democratic-Republican) 57.6%; ▌John Pope (Democratic-Republican) 42.4%
Kentucky 3	Richard M. Johnson	Democratic- Republican	1806	Incumbent re-elected.	▌ ✓ Richard M. Johnson (Democratic-Republican) 56.6%; ▌Benjamin Taylor (Federalist) 43.4%
Kentucky 4	Joseph Desha	Democratic- Republican	1806	Incumbent re-elected.	▌ ✓ Joseph Desha (Democratic-Republican) 56.1%; ▌William Garrard (Unknown) 43.9%
Kentucky 5	Alney McLean	Democratic- Republican	1814	Incumbent retired. Democratic-Republican hold.	▌ ✓ Anthony New (Democratic-Republican) 64.4%; ▌Benjamin W. Patton (Unknown) 35.6%
Kentucky 6	Solomon P. Sharp	Democratic- Republican	1812	Incumbent lost-re-election. Democratic-Republican hold.	▌ ✓ David Walker (Democratic-Republican) 54.2%; ▌William Thompson (Unknown) 37.7%; ▌Solomon P. Sharp (Democratic-Republican) 8.2%
Kentucky 7	Samuel McKee	Democratic- Republican	1808	Incumbent retired. Democratic-Republican hold.	▌ ✓ George Robertson (Democratic-Republican) 62.3%; ▌Robert Caldwell (Unknown) 37.7%
Kentucky 8	Stephen Ormsby	Democratic- Republican	1810; 1812 (lost); 1813 (special)	Incumbent lost-re-election. Democratic-Republican hold.	▌ ✓ Richard Anderson (Democratic-Republican) 56.8%; ▌Edward George (Unknown) 34.6%; ▌Stephen Ormsby (Democratic-Republican) 8.6%
Kentucky 9	Micah Taul	Democratic- Republican	1814	Incumbent retired. Democratic-Republican hold.	▌ ✓ Tunstal Quarles (Democratic-Republican) (Note: Numbers of votes missing or incomplete in source); ▌Rife (Note: Full name unknown.)
Kentucky 10	Benjamin Hardin	Democratic- Republican	1814	Incumbent retired. Democratic-Republican hold.	▌ ✓ Thomas Speed (Democratic-Republican) 42.3%; ▌James Crutcher (Unknown) 31.2%; ▌John Lancaster (Unknown) 26.5%

== Louisiana ==
Louisiana elected its members July 1–3, 1816.

District	Incumbent			This race	
District	Member	Party	First elected	Results	Candidates
Louisiana at-large	Thomas B. Robertson	Democratic-Republican	1812	Incumbent re-elected.	▌ ✓ Thomas B. Robertson (Democratic-Republican) 100%

== Maryland ==
Maryland elected its members October 6, 1816.

District	Incumbent			This race	
District	Member	Party	First elected	Results	Candidates
Maryland 1	Philip Stuart	Federalist	1810	Incumbent re-elected.	▌ ✓ Philip Stuart (Federalist) 99.1%
Maryland 2	John C. Herbert	Federalist	1814	Incumbent re-elected.	▌ ✓ John C. Herbert (Federalist) 50.6%; ▌Joshua Barney (Democratic-Republican) 49.2%
Maryland 3	Alexander C. Hanson	Federalist	1812	Incumbent resigned in 1816 when elected U.S. Senator. Winner was also elected to finish the term, see above. Federalist hold.	▌ ✓ George Peter (Federalist) 46.0%; ▌Charles Kilgour (Federalist) 30.4%; ▌Nicholas Snethen (Democratic-Republican) 23.6%
Maryland 4	George Baer Jr.	Federalist	1796; 1801 (retired); 1814	Incumbent retired. Democratic-Republican gain.	▌ ✓ Samuel Ringgold (Democratic-Republican) 53.6%; ▌Matthew Van Lear (Federalist) 46.3%
Maryland 5 Plural district with 2 seats	Samuel Smith	Democratic-Republican	1792; 1802 (retired); 1816 (special)	Incumbent re-elected.	▌ ✓ Samuel Smith (Democratic-Republican) 42.0%; ▌ ✓ Peter Little (Democratic-Republican) 31.4%; ▌Tobias Stansbury (Democratic-Republican) 26.6%
Maryland 5 Plural district with 2 seats	Peter Little	Democratic-Republican	1816 (special)	Incumbent re-elected.	▌ ✓ Samuel Smith (Democratic-Republican) 42.0%; ▌ ✓ Peter Little (Democratic-Republican) 31.4%; ▌Tobias Stansbury (Democratic-Republican) 26.6%
Maryland 6	Stevenson Archer	Democratic-Republican	1811 (special)	Incumbent lost-re-election. Democratic-Republican hold.	▌ ✓ Philip Reed (Democratic-Republican) 51.5%; ▌Stevenson Archer (Democratic-Republican) 48.5%
Maryland 7	Robert Wright	Democratic-Republican	1810 (special)	Incumbent retired. Democratic-Republican hold.	▌ ✓ Thomas Culbreth (Democratic-Republican) 50.8%; ▌William Potter (Federalist) 49.2%
Maryland 8	Charles Goldsborough	Federalist	1804	Incumbent retired. Federalist hold.	▌ ✓ Thomas Bayly (Federalist) 51.7%; ▌Ephraim King Wilson (Federalist) 46.6%; ▌Thomas Williams (Democratic-Republican) 1.8%

== Massachusetts ==
Massachusetts's electoral law required a majority for election. In five districts this was not met on the first election, requiring additional trials to be held.

Massachusetts elected its members November 4, 1816.

District numbers differed between source used and elsewhere on Wikipedia; district numbers used elsewhere on Wikipedia used here.

District	Incumbent			This race	
District	Member	Party	First elected	Results	Candidates
Massachusetts 1 "Suffolk district"	Artemas Ward Jr.	Federalist	1812	Incumbent retired. Federalist hold. Winner declined to serve and was replaced in a special election.	▌ ✓ James Lloyd (Federalist) 98.0%; ▌Benjamin Austin (Democratic-Republican) 2.0%
Massachusetts 2 "Essex South district"	Timothy Pickering	Federalist	1812	Incumbent retired. Democratic-Republican gain.	▌ ✓ Nathaniel Silsbee (Democratic-Republican) 50.5%; ▌Thomas Stevens (Federalist) 49.5%
Massachusetts 3 "Essex North district"	Jeremiah Nelson	Federalist	1804; 1806 (retired); 1814	Incumbent re-elected.	First ballot (November 4, 1816): ▌William B. Banister (Federalist) 44.0%; ▌Thomas Kitteridge (Democratic-Republican) 39.4%; ▌Samuel L. Knapp (Federalist) 9.7%; ▌Ebenezer Moseley (Federalist) 5.7%; ▌Jeremiah Nelson (Federalist) 1.2%; Second ballot (January 27, 1817): ▌William B. Banister (Federalist) 46.0%; ▌Thomas Kitteridge (Democratic-Republican) 39.0%; ▌Jeremiah Nelson (Federalist) 11.8%; Others 3.2%; Third ballot (May 1, 1817): ▌ ✓ Jeremiah Nelson (Federalist) 57.7%; ▌Thomas Kitteridge (Democratic-Republican) 33.9%; Others 8.4%
Massachusetts 4 "Middlesex district"	Asahel Stearns	Federalist	1814	Incumbent lost-re-election. Democratic-Republican gain.	▌ ✓ Timothy Fuller (Democratic-Republican) 55.0%; ▌Asahel Stearns (Federalist) 45.0%
Massachusetts 5 "Hampshire South district"	Elijah H. Mills	Federalist	1814	Incumbent re-elected.	▌ ✓ Elijah H. Mills (Federalist) 81.0%; ▌Enos Foot (Democratic-Republican) 9.9%; ▌Lewis Strong (Federalist) 6.7%; Others 2.5%
Massachusetts 6 "Hampshire North district"	Samuel Taggart	Federalist	1803	Incumbent retired. Federalist hold.	▌ ✓ Samuel C. Allen (Federalist) 67.7%; ▌Noah Webster (Independent) 15.6%; ▌Elihu Lyman (Democratic-Republican) 13.6%; Others 3.2%
Massachusetts 7 "Berkshire district"	John W. Hulbert	Federalist	1812	Incumbent retired. Democratic-Republican gain.	▌ ✓ Henry Shaw (Democratic-Republican) 52.2%; ▌Daniel Noble (Federalist) 46.0%; Others 1.8%
Massachusetts 8 "Plymouth district"	William Baylies	Federalist	1812	Incumbent retired. Democratic-Republican gain.	First ballot (November 4, 1816): ▌Zabdiel Sampson (Democratic-Republican) 49.2%; ▌Wilkes Wood (Federalist) 46.2%; Others 4.6%; Second ballot (January 27, 1817): ▌ ✓ Zabdiel Sampson (Democratic-Republican) 51.8%; ▌Wilkes Wood (Federalist) 47.0%; Others 1.2%
Massachusetts 9 "Barnstable district"	John Reed Jr.	Federalist	1812	Incumbent lost-re-election. Democratic-Republican gain.	First ballot (November 4, 1816): ▌Walter Folger Jr. (Democratic-Republican) 49.7%; ▌John Reed Jr. (Federalist) 36.4%; ▌Elijah Cobb (Federalist) 10.4%; Others 3.5%; Second ballot (January 27, 1817): ▌Walter Folger Jr. (Democratic-Republican) 46.9%; ▌John Reed Jr. (Federalist) 30.2%; ▌Thadeus Coffin (Federalist) 21.4%; ▌Elijah Cobb (Federalist) 1.5%; Third ballot (May 1, 1817): ▌ ✓ Walter Folger Jr. (Democratic-Republican) 52.8%; ▌John Reed Jr. (Federalist) 39.5%; ▌William Wills (Federalist) 6.2%; Others 1.6%
Massachusetts 10 "Bristol district"	Laban Wheaton	Federalist	1808	Incumbent retired. Democratic-Republican gain.	▌ ✓ Marcus Morton (Democratic-Republican) 50.6%; ▌Samuel Crocker (Federalist) 46.3%; Others 3.1%
Massachusetts 11 "Worcester South district"	Elijah Brigham	Federalist	1810	Incumbent retired. Federalist hold.	▌ ✓ Benjamin Adams (Federalist) 66.3%; ▌Abraham Lincoln (Democratic-Republican) 30.6%; ▌Levi Lincoln Sr. (Democratic-Republican) 3.1%
Massachusetts 12 "Worcester North district"	Solomon Strong	Federalist	1814	Incumbent re-elected.	▌ ✓ Solomon Strong (Federalist) 69.4%; ▌Edmund Cushing (Democratic-Republican) 30.6%
Massachusetts 13 "Norfolk district"	Nathaniel Ruggles	Federalist	1812	Incumbent re-elected.	▌ ✓ Nathaniel Ruggles (Federalist) 50.4%; ▌Ebenezer Seaver (Democratic-Republican) 46.9%; Others 2.7%
Massachusetts 14 "1st Eastern district" District of Maine	Cyrus King	Federalist	1812	Incumbent lost-re-election. Democratic-Republican gain.	▌ ✓ John Holmes (Democratic-Republican) 58.9%; ▌Cyrus King (Federalist) 38.0%; Others 3.1%
Massachusetts 15 "2nd Eastern district" District of Maine	George Bradbury	Federalist	1812	Incumbent retired. Federalist hold.	▌ ✓ Ezekiel Whitman (Federalist) 51.5%; ▌Mark Harris (Democratic-Republican) 48.5%
Massachusetts 16 "3rd Eastern district" District of Maine	Benjamin Brown	Federalist	1812	Ran for re-election in the 18th district Federalist hold.	▌ ✓ Benjamin Orr (Federalist) 63.3%; ▌Erastus Foote (Democratic-Republican) 36.7%
Massachusetts 17 "4th Eastern district" District of Maine	James Carr	Democratic- Republican	1815	Incumbent retired. Federalist gain.	▌ ✓ John Wilson (Federalist) 55.2%; ▌Martin Kinsley (Democratic-Republican) 44.8%
Massachusetts 18 "5th Eastern district" District of Maine	Thomas Rice	Federalist	1814	Incumbent re-elected.	First ballot (November 4, 1816): ▌Benjamin Brown (Federalist) 41.2%; ▌Nathan Cutler (Democratic-Republican) 31.6%; ▌Samuel S. Conner (Democratic-Republican) 27.2%; Second ballot (January 27, 1817): ▌Benjamin Brown (Federalist) 45.0%; ▌Samuel S. Conner (Democratic-Republican) 22.5%; ▌Nathan Cutler (Democratic-Republican) 21.9%; Others 10.6%; Third ballot (May 1, 1817): ▌Benjamin Brown (Federalist) 39.4%; ▌Samuel S. Conner (Democratic-Republican) 31.4%; ▌Nathan Cutler (Democratic-Republican) 15.9%; ▌Obed Wilson (Democratic-Republican) 7.0%; ▌Joshua Cushman (Democratic-Republican) 3.1%; Others 3.2%; Fourth ballot (July 21, 1817): ▌Thomas Rice (Federalist) 48.7%; ▌Samuel S. Conner (Democratic-Republican) 37.8%; ▌Obed Wilson (Democratic-Republican) 7.5%; ▌Joshua Cushman (Democratic-Republican) 2.5%; Others 3.5%; Fifth ballot (September 29, 1817): ▌Joshua Cushman (Democratic-Republican) 47.2%; ▌Thomas Rice (Federalist) 40.4%; Others 12.4%; Sixth ballot (December 1, 1817): ▌ ✓ Thomas Rice (Federalist) 51.0%; ▌Joshua Cushman (Democratic-Republican) 45.6%; Others 3.4%
Massachusetts 18 "5th Eastern district" District of Maine	Samuel S. Conner; Formerly served in the 19th district.	Democratic- Republican	1815	Incumbent lost re-election. Democratic-Republican loss.	
Massachusetts 19 "6th Eastern district" District of Maine	Vacant			Incumbent ran in the 18th district. Democratic-Republican gain.	First ballot (November 4, 1816): ▌James Parker (Democratic-Republican) 42.9%; ▌Thomas Rice (Federalist) 41.2%; ▌John Chandler (Democratic-Republican) 15.0%; Others 0.9%; Second ballot (January 27, 1817): ▌Thomas Rice (Federalist) 38.2%; ▌John Chandler (Democratic-Republican) 31.7%; ▌James Parker (Democratic-Republican) 30.1%; Third ballot (May 1, 1817): ▌James Parker (Democratic-Republican) 43.8%; ▌Peter Grant (Federalist) 39.0%; ▌Thomas Rice (Federalist) 6.5%; ▌Joshua Gage (Democratic-Republican) 5.6%; ▌John Chandler (Democratic-Republican) 5.1%; Fourth ballot (July 21, 1817): ▌Peter Grant (Federalist) 50.0% (Note: Exactly 50%.); ▌James Parker (Democratic-Republican) 32.2%; ▌Joshua Gage (Democratic-Republican) 11.9%; Others 5.9%; Fifth ballot (September 29, 1817): ▌ ✓ Joshua Gage (Democratic-Republican) 60.4%; ▌Peter Grant (Federalist) 39.6%
Massachusetts 20 "7th Eastern district" District of Maine	Albion K. Parris	Democratic- Republican	1814	Incumbent re-elected.	▌ ✓ Albion K. Parris (Democratic-Republican) 58.2%; ▌Samuel A. Bradley (Federalist) 35.8%; ▌Levi Hubbard (Democratic-Republican) 6.0%

== Mississippi ==
Mississippi was admitted as a state on December 10, 1817 from the western half of the former Mississippi Territory (the eastern half became Alabama Territory) It elected its first representative to Congress August 4–5, 1817.

District	Incumbent			This race	
District	Member	Party	First elected	Results	Candidates
Mississippi at-large	None (District created)			New seat. Democratic-Republican gain.	▌ ✓ George Poindexter (Democratic-Republican) 99.8%; ▌Christopher Rankin (Democratic-Republican) 0.2%

== Missouri Territory ==
See Non-voting delegates, below.

== New Hampshire ==
New Hampshire elected its members August 26, 1816.

District	Incumbent			This race	
District	Member	Party	First elected	Results	Candidates
New Hampshire at-large 6 seats on a general ticket	Bradbury Cilley	Federalist	1812	Incumbent lost-re-election. Democratic-Republican gain.	▌ ✓ Josiah Butler (Democratic-Republican) 8.9%; ▌ ✓ Nathaniel Upham (Democratic-Republican) 8.9%; ▌ ✓ Clifton Clagett (Democratic-Republican) 8.9%; ▌ ✓ Salma Hale (Democratic-Republican) 8.9%; ▌ ✓ John F. Parrott (Democratic-Republican) 8.7%; ▌ ✓ Arthur Livermore (Democratic-Republican) 8.7%; ▌William Hale (Federalist) 7.8%; ▌Jeremiah Smith (Federalist) 7.8%; ▌Jeduthun Wilcox (Federalist) 7.8%; ▌Roger Vose (Federalist) 7.8%; ▌Bradbury Cilley (Federalist) 7.7%; ▌Parker Noyes (Federalist) 7.7%
New Hampshire at-large 6 seats on a general ticket	Charles Humphrey Atherton	Federalist	1814	Incumbent retired. Democratic-Republican gain.	▌ ✓ Josiah Butler (Democratic-Republican) 8.9%; ▌ ✓ Nathaniel Upham (Democratic-Republican) 8.9%; ▌ ✓ Clifton Clagett (Democratic-Republican) 8.9%; ▌ ✓ Salma Hale (Democratic-Republican) 8.9%; ▌ ✓ John F. Parrott (Democratic-Republican) 8.7%; ▌ ✓ Arthur Livermore (Democratic-Republican) 8.7%; ▌William Hale (Federalist) 7.8%; ▌Jeremiah Smith (Federalist) 7.8%; ▌Jeduthun Wilcox (Federalist) 7.8%; ▌Roger Vose (Federalist) 7.8%; ▌Bradbury Cilley (Federalist) 7.7%; ▌Parker Noyes (Federalist) 7.7%
New Hampshire at-large 6 seats on a general ticket	William Hale	Federalist	1808; 1810 (lost); 1812	Incumbent lost-re-election. Democratic-Republican gain.	▌ ✓ Josiah Butler (Democratic-Republican) 8.9%; ▌ ✓ Nathaniel Upham (Democratic-Republican) 8.9%; ▌ ✓ Clifton Clagett (Democratic-Republican) 8.9%; ▌ ✓ Salma Hale (Democratic-Republican) 8.9%; ▌ ✓ John F. Parrott (Democratic-Republican) 8.7%; ▌ ✓ Arthur Livermore (Democratic-Republican) 8.7%; ▌William Hale (Federalist) 7.8%; ▌Jeremiah Smith (Federalist) 7.8%; ▌Jeduthun Wilcox (Federalist) 7.8%; ▌Roger Vose (Federalist) 7.8%; ▌Bradbury Cilley (Federalist) 7.7%; ▌Parker Noyes (Federalist) 7.7%
New Hampshire at-large 6 seats on a general ticket	Roger Vose	Federalist	1812	Incumbent lost-re-election. Democratic-Republican gain.	▌ ✓ Josiah Butler (Democratic-Republican) 8.9%; ▌ ✓ Nathaniel Upham (Democratic-Republican) 8.9%; ▌ ✓ Clifton Clagett (Democratic-Republican) 8.9%; ▌ ✓ Salma Hale (Democratic-Republican) 8.9%; ▌ ✓ John F. Parrott (Democratic-Republican) 8.7%; ▌ ✓ Arthur Livermore (Democratic-Republican) 8.7%; ▌William Hale (Federalist) 7.8%; ▌Jeremiah Smith (Federalist) 7.8%; ▌Jeduthun Wilcox (Federalist) 7.8%; ▌Roger Vose (Federalist) 7.8%; ▌Bradbury Cilley (Federalist) 7.7%; ▌Parker Noyes (Federalist) 7.7%
New Hampshire at-large 6 seats on a general ticket	Daniel Webster	Federalist	1812	Incumbent retired. Democratic-Republican gain.	▌ ✓ Josiah Butler (Democratic-Republican) 8.9%; ▌ ✓ Nathaniel Upham (Democratic-Republican) 8.9%; ▌ ✓ Clifton Clagett (Democratic-Republican) 8.9%; ▌ ✓ Salma Hale (Democratic-Republican) 8.9%; ▌ ✓ John F. Parrott (Democratic-Republican) 8.7%; ▌ ✓ Arthur Livermore (Democratic-Republican) 8.7%; ▌William Hale (Federalist) 7.8%; ▌Jeremiah Smith (Federalist) 7.8%; ▌Jeduthun Wilcox (Federalist) 7.8%; ▌Roger Vose (Federalist) 7.8%; ▌Bradbury Cilley (Federalist) 7.7%; ▌Parker Noyes (Federalist) 7.7%
New Hampshire at-large 6 seats on a general ticket	Jeduthun Wilcox	Federalist	1812	Incumbent lost-re-election. Democratic-Republican gain.	▌ ✓ Josiah Butler (Democratic-Republican) 8.9%; ▌ ✓ Nathaniel Upham (Democratic-Republican) 8.9%; ▌ ✓ Clifton Clagett (Democratic-Republican) 8.9%; ▌ ✓ Salma Hale (Democratic-Republican) 8.9%; ▌ ✓ John F. Parrott (Democratic-Republican) 8.7%; ▌ ✓ Arthur Livermore (Democratic-Republican) 8.7%; ▌William Hale (Federalist) 7.8%; ▌Jeremiah Smith (Federalist) 7.8%; ▌Jeduthun Wilcox (Federalist) 7.8%; ▌Roger Vose (Federalist) 7.8%; ▌Bradbury Cilley (Federalist) 7.7%; ▌Parker Noyes (Federalist) 7.7%

== New Jersey ==
In 1816, the Democratic-Republican candidates ran unopposed.

New Jersey elected its members November 4–5, 1816.

District	Incumbent			This race	
District	Member	Party	First elected	Results	Candidates
New Jersey at-large 6 seats on a general ticket	Lewis Condict	Democratic-Republican	1810	Incumbent retired. Democratic-Republican hold.	▌ ✓ John Linn (Democratic-Republican) 17.1%; ▌ ✓ Charles Kinsey (Democratic-Republican) 16.8%; ▌ ✓ Henry Southard (Democratic-Republican) 16.7%; ▌ ✓ Joseph Bloomfield (Democratic-Republican) 16.6%; ▌ ✓ Benjamin Bennet (Democratic-Republican) 16.5%; ▌ ✓ Ephraim Bateman (Democratic-Republican) 16.4%
New Jersey at-large 6 seats on a general ticket	Thomas Ward	Democratic-Republican	1813	Incumbent retired. Democratic-Republican hold.	▌ ✓ John Linn (Democratic-Republican) 17.1%; ▌ ✓ Charles Kinsey (Democratic-Republican) 16.8%; ▌ ✓ Henry Southard (Democratic-Republican) 16.7%; ▌ ✓ Joseph Bloomfield (Democratic-Republican) 16.6%; ▌ ✓ Benjamin Bennet (Democratic-Republican) 16.5%; ▌ ✓ Ephraim Bateman (Democratic-Republican) 16.4%
New Jersey at-large 6 seats on a general ticket	Henry Southard	Democratic-Republican	1814	Incumbent re-elected.	▌ ✓ John Linn (Democratic-Republican) 17.1%; ▌ ✓ Charles Kinsey (Democratic-Republican) 16.8%; ▌ ✓ Henry Southard (Democratic-Republican) 16.7%; ▌ ✓ Joseph Bloomfield (Democratic-Republican) 16.6%; ▌ ✓ Benjamin Bennet (Democratic-Republican) 16.5%; ▌ ✓ Ephraim Bateman (Democratic-Republican) 16.4%
New Jersey at-large 6 seats on a general ticket	Ephraim Bateman	Democratic-Republican	1814	Incumbent re-elected.	▌ ✓ John Linn (Democratic-Republican) 17.1%; ▌ ✓ Charles Kinsey (Democratic-Republican) 16.8%; ▌ ✓ Henry Southard (Democratic-Republican) 16.7%; ▌ ✓ Joseph Bloomfield (Democratic-Republican) 16.6%; ▌ ✓ Benjamin Bennet (Democratic-Republican) 16.5%; ▌ ✓ Ephraim Bateman (Democratic-Republican) 16.4%
New Jersey at-large 6 seats on a general ticket	Ezra Baker	Democratic-Republican	1814	Incumbent retired. Democratic-Republican hold.	▌ ✓ John Linn (Democratic-Republican) 17.1%; ▌ ✓ Charles Kinsey (Democratic-Republican) 16.8%; ▌ ✓ Henry Southard (Democratic-Republican) 16.7%; ▌ ✓ Joseph Bloomfield (Democratic-Republican) 16.6%; ▌ ✓ Benjamin Bennet (Democratic-Republican) 16.5%; ▌ ✓ Ephraim Bateman (Democratic-Republican) 16.4%
New Jersey at-large 6 seats on a general ticket	Benjamin Bennet	Democratic-Republican	1814	Incumbent re-elected.	▌ ✓ John Linn (Democratic-Republican) 17.1%; ▌ ✓ Charles Kinsey (Democratic-Republican) 16.8%; ▌ ✓ Henry Southard (Democratic-Republican) 16.7%; ▌ ✓ Joseph Bloomfield (Democratic-Republican) 16.6%; ▌ ✓ Benjamin Bennet (Democratic-Republican) 16.5%; ▌ ✓ Ephraim Bateman (Democratic-Republican) 16.4%

== New York ==
New York elected its members April 23 to 25, 1816.

District	Incumbent			This race	
District	Member	Party	First elected	Results	Candidates
New York 1 Plural district with 2 seats	George Townsend	Democratic- Republican	1814	Incumbent re-elected.	▌ ✓ George Townsend (Democratic-Republican) 26.9%; ▌ ✓ Tredwell Scudder (Democratic-Republican) 26.8%; ▌Nathaniel Smith (Federalist) 23.2%; ▌Samuel Jones (Federalist) 23.2%
New York 1 Plural district with 2 seats	Henry Crocheron	Democratic- Republican	1814	Incumbent retired. Democratic-Republican hold.	▌ ✓ George Townsend (Democratic-Republican) 26.9%; ▌ ✓ Tredwell Scudder (Democratic-Republican) 26.8%; ▌Nathaniel Smith (Federalist) 23.2%; ▌Samuel Jones (Federalist) 23.2%
New York 2 Plural district with 2 seats	William Irving	Democratic- Republican	1813 (special)	Incumbent re-elected.	▌ ✓ William Irving (Democratic-Republican) 29.0%; ▌ ✓ Peter H. Wendover (Democratic-Republican) 28.9%; ▌Josiah Ogden Hoffman Sr. (Federalist) 21.1%; ▌Isaac Ely (Federalist) 21.0%
New York 2 Plural district with 2 seats	Peter H. Wendover	Democratic- Republican	1814	Incumbent re-elected.	▌ ✓ William Irving (Democratic-Republican) 29.0%; ▌ ✓ Peter H. Wendover (Democratic-Republican) 28.9%; ▌Josiah Ogden Hoffman Sr. (Federalist) 21.1%; ▌Isaac Ely (Federalist) 21.0%
New York 3	Jonathan Ward	Democratic- Republican	1814	Incumbent retired. Democratic-Republican hold.	▌ ✓ Caleb Tompkins (Democratic-Republican) 56.8%; ▌Abraham Odell (Federalist) 42.8%
New York 4	Abraham H. Schenck	Democratic- Republican	1814	Incumbent retired. Democratic-Republican hold. Winner died February 18, 1817, leading to a special election.	▌ ✓ Henry B. Lee (Democratic-Republican) 52.6%; ▌Henry A. Livingston (Federalist) 47.2%
New York 5	Thomas P. Grosvenor	Federalist	1812	Incumbent retired. Federalist hold.	▌ ✓ Philip J. Schuyler (Federalist) 58.8%; ▌James I. Van Alen (Democratic-Republican) 41.1%
New York 6	James W. Wilkin	Democratic- Republican	1815 (special)	Incumbent re-elected.	▌ ✓ James W. Wilkin (Democratic-Republican) 55.4%; ▌James Burt (Federalist) 44.6%
New York 7	Samuel Betts	Democratic- Republican	1814	Incumbent retired. Democratic-Republican hold.	▌ ✓ Josiah Hasbrouck (Democratic-Republican) 51.7%; ▌John Sudam (Federalist) 48.2%
New York 8	Erastus Root	Democratic- Republican	1802; 1804 (lost); 1808; 1810 (retired); 1815 (won contest)	Incumbent retired. Democratic-Republican hold.	▌ ✓ Dorrance Kirtland (Democratic-Republican) 56.2%; ▌Samuel Sherwood (Federalist) 43.7%
New York 9	John Lovett	Federalist	1812	Incumbent lost-re-election. Federalist hold.	▌ ✓ Rensselaer Westerlo (Federalist) 56.2%; ▌Elisha Jenkins (Democratic-Republican) 36.6%; ▌John Lovett (Federalist) 7.1%
New York 10	Hosea Moffitt	Federalist	1812	Incumbent retired. Federalist hold.	▌ ✓ John P. Cushman (Federalist) 54.9%; ▌Thomas Turner (Democratic-Republican) 44.9%
New York 11	John W. Taylor	Democratic- Republican	1812	Incumbent re-elected.	▌ ✓ John W. Taylor (Democratic-Republican) 53.4%; ▌Elisha Powell (Federalist) 46.6%
New York 12 Plural district with 2 seats	John Savage	Democratic- Republican	1814	Incumbent re-elected.	▌ ✓ John Savage (Democratic-Republican) 27.2%; ▌ ✓ John Palmer (Democratic-Republican) 24.5%; ▌Henry H. Ross (Federalist) 24.3%; ▌Zebulon R. Shipherd (Federalist) 24.1%
New York 12 Plural district with 2 seats	Asa Adgate	Democratic- Republican	1815 (special)	Incumbent retired. Democratic-Republican hold.	▌ ✓ John Savage (Democratic-Republican) 27.2%; ▌ ✓ John Palmer (Democratic-Republican) 24.5%; ▌Henry H. Ross (Federalist) 24.3%; ▌Zebulon R. Shipherd (Federalist) 24.1%
New York 13	John B. Yates	Democratic- Republican	1814	Incumbent retired. Democratic-Republican hold.	▌ ✓ Thomas Lawyer (Democratic-Republican) 54.9%; ▌William Beekman (Federalist) 45.1%
New York 14	Daniel Cady	Federalist	1814	Incumbent retired. Democratic-Republican gain.	▌ ✓ John Herkimer (Democratic-Republican) 50.8%; ▌Richard Van Horn (Federalist) 49.2%
New York 15 Plural district with 2 seats	Jabez D. Hammond	Democratic- Republican	1814	Incumbent retired. Democratic-Republican hold.	▌ ✓ Isaac Williams Jr. (Democratic-Republican) 26.6%; ▌ ✓ John R. Drake (Democratic-Republican) 26.6%; ▌James Clapp (Federalist) 23.4%; ▌James Hyde (Federalist) 23.4%
New York 15 Plural district with 2 seats	James Birdsall	Democratic- Republican	1814	Incumbent retired. Democratic-Republican hold.	▌ ✓ Isaac Williams Jr. (Democratic-Republican) 26.6%; ▌ ✓ John R. Drake (Democratic-Republican) 26.6%; ▌James Clapp (Federalist) 23.4%; ▌James Hyde (Federalist) 23.4%
New York 16	Thomas R. Gold	Federalist	1808; 1814	Incumbent retired. Federalist hold.	▌ ✓ Henry R. Storrs (Federalist) 52.5%; ▌Nathan Williams (Democratic-Republican) 47.3%
New York 17	Westel Willoughby Jr.	Federalist	1814	Incumbent retired. Democratic-Republican gain.	▌ ✓ Thomas H. Hubbard (Democratic-Republican) 51.5%; ▌Simeon Ford (Federalist) 48.4%
New York 18	Moss Kent	Federalist	1812	Incumbent retired. Federalist hold.	▌ ✓ David A. Ogden (Federalist) 50.4%; ▌Ela Collins (Democratic-Republican) 49.5%
New York 19	Victory Birdseye	Democratic- Republican	1814	Incumbent retired. Democratic-Republican hold.	▌ ✓ James Porter (Democratic-Republican) 55.3%; ▌James Geddes (Federalist) 44.5%
New York 20 Plural district with 2 seats	Enos T. Throop	Democratic- Republican	1814	Incumbent lost-re-election. Democratic-Republican hold. Incumbent then resigned June 4, 1816, leading to a special election.	▌ ✓ Daniel Cruger (Democratic-Republican) 35.5%; ▌ ✓ Oliver C. Comstock (Democratic-Republican) 25.7%; ▌Elijah Miller (Federalist) 14.5%; ▌Benjamin Johnson (Federalist) 10.1%; ▌Enos T. Throop (Democratic-Republican) 7.1%; ▌Eleazer Lindsley (Federalist) 4.0%
New York 20 Plural district with 2 seats	Oliver C. Comstock	Democratic- Republican	1812	Incumbent re-elected.	▌ ✓ Daniel Cruger (Democratic-Republican) 35.5%; ▌ ✓ Oliver C. Comstock (Democratic-Republican) 25.7%; ▌Elijah Miller (Federalist) 14.5%; ▌Benjamin Johnson (Federalist) 10.1%; ▌Enos T. Throop (Democratic-Republican) 7.1%; ▌Eleazer Lindsley (Federalist) 4.0%
New York 21 Plural district with 2 seats	Micah Brooks	Democratic- Republican	1814	Incumbent lost-re-election. Democratic-Republican hold.	▌ ✓ Benjamin Ellicott (Democratic-Republican) 29.4%; ▌ ✓ John C. Spencer (Democratic-Republican) 27.0%; ▌Phillip Church (Federalist) 20.6%; ▌Graham Newell (Federalist) 20.4%; ▌Micah Brooks (Democratic-Republican) 2.2%
New York 21 Plural district with 2 seats	Peter B. Porter	Democratic- Republican	1808; 1812 (retired); 1814	Incumbent resigned January 23, 1816 to become Commissioner under the Treaty of Ghent. Democratic-Republican hold. Winner was not elected to finish the term, see above.	▌ ✓ Benjamin Ellicott (Democratic-Republican) 29.4%; ▌ ✓ John C. Spencer (Democratic-Republican) 27.0%; ▌Phillip Church (Federalist) 20.6%; ▌Graham Newell (Federalist) 20.4%; ▌Micah Brooks (Democratic-Republican) 2.2%

== North Carolina ==
North Carolina elected its members August 14, 1817.

District	Incumbent			This race	
District	Member	Party	First elected	Results	Candidates
North Carolina 1	William H. Murfree	Democratic-Republican	1813	Incumbent retired. Democratic-Republican hold.	▌ ✓ Lemuel Sawyer (Democratic-Republican) 38.0%; ▌Joseph Ferebee (Democratic-Republican) 33.1%; ▌Henry Skinner (Federalist) 28.9%
North Carolina 2	Joseph H. Bryan	Democratic-Republican	1815	Incumbent re-elected.	▌ ✓ Joseph H. Bryan (Democratic-Republican)
North Carolina 3	James W. Clark	Democratic-Republican	1815	Incumbent retired. Democratic-Republican hold.	▌ ✓ Thomas H. Hall (Democratic-Republican) 100%
North Carolina 4	William Gaston	Federalist	1813	Incumbent retired. Federalist hold.	▌ ✓ Jesse Slocumb (Federalist) 54.0%; ▌Henry J. G. Ruffin (Democratic-Republican) 46.0%
North Carolina 5	Charles Hooks	Democratic-Republican	1816 (special)	Incumbent lost-re-election. Democratic-Republican hold.	▌ ✓ James Owen (Democratic-Republican) 55.4%; ▌Charles Hooks (Democratic-Republican) 44.6%
North Carolina 6	Weldon N. Edwards	Democratic-Republican	1816 (special)	Incumbent re-elected.	▌ ✓ Weldon N. Edwards (Democratic-Republican) 80.5%; ▌Solomon Green (Federalist) 19.5%
North Carolina 7	John Culpepper	Federalist	1806; 1808 (contested); 1808 (special); 1813	Incumbent lost-re-election. Federalist hold. Successor died before being seated, leading to a special election.	▌ ✓ Alexander McMillan (Federalist) 58.7%; ▌John Culpepper (Federalist) 41.3%
North Carolina 8	Samuel Dickens	Democratic-Republican	1816 (special)	Incumbent lost-re-election. Democratic-Republican hold.	▌ ✓ James S. Smith (Democratic-Republican) 52.3%; ▌Samuel Dickens (Democratic-Republican) 46.9%
North Carolina 9	Bartlett Yancey	Democratic-Republican	1813	Incumbent retired. Democratic-Republican hold.	▌ ✓ Thomas Settle (Democratic-Republican) 78.4%; ▌Romulus M. Saunders (Democratic-Republican) 21.6%
North Carolina 10	William C. Love	Democratic-Republican	1815	Incumbent retired. Democratic-Republican hold.	▌ ✓ George Mumford (Democratic-Republican) 53.9%; ▌John L. Henderson (Federalist) 46.1%
North Carolina 11	Daniel M. Forney	Democratic-Republican	1815	Incumbent re-elected.	▌ ✓ Daniel M. Forney (Democratic-Republican)
North Carolina 12	Israel Pickens	Democratic-Republican	1810	Incumbent retired. Democratic-Republican hold.	▌ ✓ Felix Walker (Democratic-Republican) 42.8%; ▌John Paxton (Democratic-Republican) 38.5%; ▌William Porter (Democratic-Republican) 18.7%
North Carolina 13	Lewis Williams	Democratic-Republican	1815	Incumbent re-elected.	▌ ✓ Lewis Williams (Democratic-Republican)

== Ohio ==
Ohio elected its members October 8, 1816.

District	Incumbent			This race	
District	Member	Party	First elected	Results	Candidates
Ohio 1	John McLean	Democratic- Republican	1812	Incumbent resigned in April 1816 become Associate Judge of Ohio Supreme Court. Democratic-Republican hold. Winner also elected, the same day, to finish the current next term.	▌ ✓ William Henry Harrison (Democratic-Republican) 57.2%; ▌Thomas R. Ross (Democratic-Republican) 24.0%; ▌William Corry (Federalist) 10.4%; ▌William C. Schenck (Federalist) 6.0%; ▌Matthias Ross (Democratic-Republican) 1.5%
Ohio 2	John Alexander	Democratic- Republican	1812	Incumbent lost-re-election. Democratic-Republican hold.	▌ ✓ John W. Campbell (Democratic-Republican) 55.9%; ▌Isaiah Morris (Democratic-Republican) 23.0%; ▌Thomas Morris (Democratic-Republican) 17.4%; ▌John Alexander (Democratic-Republican) 1.8%; ▌Thomas Foote (Democratic-Republican) 1.2%
Ohio 3	William Creighton Jr.	Democratic- Republican	1813 (special)	Incumbent retired. Democratic-Republican hold.	▌ ✓ Levi Barber (Democratic-Republican) 40.7%; ▌Henry Brush (Democratic-Republican) 31.5%; ▌Joseph Kerr (Democratic-Republican) 12.8%; ▌Samuel Monett (Democratic-Republican) 10.8%; ▌John A. Fulton (Democratic-Republican) 4.1%
Ohio 4	James Caldwell	Democratic- Republican	1812	Incumbent retired. Democratic-Republican hold. Election was later unsuccessfully contested.	▌ ✓ Samuel Herrick (Democratic-Republican) 57.7%; ▌John C. Wright (Democratic-Republican) 41.9%
Ohio 5	James Kilbourne	Democratic- Republican	1812	Incumbent retired. Federalist gain.	▌ ✓ Philemon Beecher (Federalist) 19.6%; ▌Joseph Vance (Democratic-Republican) 18.6%; ▌Joseph Foos (Democratic-Republican) 13.9%; ▌Daniel C. Cooper (Federalist) 13.6%; ▌William Ludlow (Democratic-Republican) 9.1%; ▌Daniel Smith (Democratic-Republican) 8.7%; ▌Fielding Lowry (Democratic-Republican) 8.2%; ▌Robert F. Slaughter (Democratic-Republican) 4.7%; ▌Chester Griswold (Democratic-Republican) 3.6%
Ohio 6	David Clendenin	Democratic- Republican	1814	Incumbent lost-re-election. Democratic-Republican hold.	▌ ✓ Peter Hitchcock (Democratic-Republican) 57.5%; ▌Joseph Richardson (Democratic-Republican) 28.0%; ▌John G. Young (Democratic-Republican) 8.5%; ▌David Clendenin (Democratic-Republican) 5.9%

== Pennsylvania ==
Pennsylvania elected its members October 8, 1816.

District	Incumbent			This race	
District	Member	Party	First elected	Results	Candidates
Pennsylvania 1 Plural district with 4 seats	John Sergeant	Federalist	1815 (special)	Incumbent re-elected.	▌ ✓ Adam Seybert (Democratic-Republican) 13.9%; ▌ ✓ William Anderson (Democratic-Republican) 13.8%; ▌ ✓ John Sergeant (Federalist) 12.5%; ▌ ✓ Joseph Hopkinson (Federalist) 12.3%; ▌William Milnor (Federalist) 12.2%; ▌Samuel Edwards (Federalist) 12.1%; ▌Jacob Summer (Democratic-Republican) 8.8%; ▌John Conard (Democratic-Republican) 8.1%; ▌William J. Duane (Democratic-Republican) 6.3%
Pennsylvania 1 Plural district with 4 seats	Joseph Hopkinson	Federalist	1814	Incumbent re-elected.	▌ ✓ Adam Seybert (Democratic-Republican) 13.9%; ▌ ✓ William Anderson (Democratic-Republican) 13.8%; ▌ ✓ John Sergeant (Federalist) 12.5%; ▌ ✓ Joseph Hopkinson (Federalist) 12.3%; ▌William Milnor (Federalist) 12.2%; ▌Samuel Edwards (Federalist) 12.1%; ▌Jacob Summer (Democratic-Republican) 8.8%; ▌John Conard (Democratic-Republican) 8.1%; ▌William J. Duane (Democratic-Republican) 6.3%
Pennsylvania 1 Plural district with 4 seats	William Milnor	Federalist	1806; 1810 (lost); 1814	Incumbent lost-re-election. Democratic-Republican gain.	▌ ✓ Adam Seybert (Democratic-Republican) 13.9%; ▌ ✓ William Anderson (Democratic-Republican) 13.8%; ▌ ✓ John Sergeant (Federalist) 12.5%; ▌ ✓ Joseph Hopkinson (Federalist) 12.3%; ▌William Milnor (Federalist) 12.2%; ▌Samuel Edwards (Federalist) 12.1%; ▌Jacob Summer (Democratic-Republican) 8.8%; ▌John Conard (Democratic-Republican) 8.1%; ▌William J. Duane (Democratic-Republican) 6.3%
Pennsylvania 1 Plural district with 4 seats	Thomas Smith	Federalist	1814	Incumbent retired. Democratic-Republican gain.	▌ ✓ Adam Seybert (Democratic-Republican) 13.9%; ▌ ✓ William Anderson (Democratic-Republican) 13.8%; ▌ ✓ John Sergeant (Federalist) 12.5%; ▌ ✓ Joseph Hopkinson (Federalist) 12.3%; ▌William Milnor (Federalist) 12.2%; ▌Samuel Edwards (Federalist) 12.1%; ▌Jacob Summer (Democratic-Republican) 8.8%; ▌John Conard (Democratic-Republican) 8.1%; ▌William J. Duane (Democratic-Republican) 6.3%
Pennsylvania 2 Plural district with 2 seats	William Darlington	Democratic-Republican	1814	Incumbent lost-re-election. Federalist gain.	▌ ✓ Levi Pawling (Federalist) 25.5%; ▌ ✓ Isaac Darlington (Federalist) 25.1%; ▌William Darlington (Democratic-Republican) 25.1%; ▌John Hahn (Unknown) 24.3%
Pennsylvania 2 Plural district with 2 seats	John Hahn	Democratic-Republican	1814	Incumbent lost-re-election. Federalist gain.	▌ ✓ Levi Pawling (Federalist) 25.5%; ▌ ✓ Isaac Darlington (Federalist) 25.1%; ▌William Darlington (Democratic-Republican) 25.1%; ▌John Hahn (Unknown) 24.3%
Pennsylvania 3 Plural district with 2 seats	John Whiteside	Democratic-Republican	1814	Incumbent re-elected.	▌ ✓ John Whiteside (Democratic-Republican) 39.4%; ▌ ✓ James M. Wallace (Democratic-Republican) 39.0%; ▌Amos Slaymaker (Federalist) 21.6%
Pennsylvania 3 Plural district with 2 seats	James M. Wallace	Democratic-Republican	1815 (special)	Incumbent re-elected.	▌ ✓ John Whiteside (Democratic-Republican) 39.4%; ▌ ✓ James M. Wallace (Democratic-Republican) 39.0%; ▌Amos Slaymaker (Federalist) 21.6%
Pennsylvania 4	Hugh Glasgow	Democratic-Republican	1812	Incumbent retired. Democratic-Republican hold.	▌ ✓ Jacob Spangler (Democratic-Republican) 67.1%; ▌Jacob Hay (Federalist) 32.9%
Pennsylvania 5 Plural district with 2 seats	William Maclay	Democratic-Republican	1814	Incumbent re-elected.	▌ ✓ William Maclay (Democratic-Republican) 31.0%; ▌ ✓ Andrew Boden (Democratic-Republican) 27.8%; ▌James McSherry (Federalist) 19.8%; ▌John McClelland (Federalist) 18.1%; ▌William Crawford (Democratic-Republican) 3.3%
Pennsylvania 5 Plural district with 2 seats	William Crawford	Democratic-Republican	1808	Incumbent lost-re-election. Democratic-Republican hold.	▌ ✓ William Maclay (Democratic-Republican) 31.0%; ▌ ✓ Andrew Boden (Democratic-Republican) 27.8%; ▌James McSherry (Federalist) 19.8%; ▌John McClelland (Federalist) 18.1%; ▌William Crawford (Democratic-Republican) 3.3%
Pennsylvania 6 Plural district with 2 seats	Samuel D. Ingham	Democratic-Republican	1812	Incumbent re-elected.	▌ ✓ John Ross (Democratic-Republican) 50.8%; ▌ ✓ Samuel D. Ingham (Democratic-Republican) 49.2%
Pennsylvania 6 Plural district with 2 seats	John Ross	Democratic-Republican	1814	Incumbent re-elected.	▌ ✓ John Ross (Democratic-Republican) 50.8%; ▌ ✓ Samuel D. Ingham (Democratic-Republican) 49.2%
Pennsylvania 7	Joseph Hiester	Democratic-Republican	1798; 1804 (retired); 1814	Incumbent re-elected.	▌ ✓ Joseph Hiester (Democratic-Republican) 85.0%; ▌Charles Shoemaker (Democratic-Republican) 8.6%; ▌Daniel Udree (Democratic-Republican) 6.4%
Pennsylvania 8	William Piper	Democratic-Republican	1810	Incumbent retired. Democratic-Republican hold.	▌ ✓ Alexander Ogle (Democratic-Republican) 99.7%
Pennsylvania 9	Thomas Burnside	Democratic-Republican	1815 (special)	Incumbent resigned in April 1816 to accept judicial appointment. New member elected October 8, 1816. Democratic-Republican hold. Successor also elected, the same day, to finish the term.	▌ ✓ William P. Maclay (Democratic-Republican) 75.7%; ▌James A. Banks (Federalist) 24.3%
Pennsylvania 10 Plural district with 2 seats	William Wilson	Democratic-Republican	1814	Incumbent re-elected.	▌ ✓ William Wilson (Democratic-Republican) 32.5%; ▌ ✓ David Scott (Democratic-Republican) 31.5%; ▌William Buyers (Federalist) 14.8; ▌George Kremer (Democratic-Republican) 8.8%; ▌Roswell Wells (Federalist) 8.8%; ▌Charles Maus (Unknown) 3.5%
Pennsylvania 10 Plural district with 2 seats	Jared Irwin	Democratic-Republican	1812	Incumbent retired. Democratic-Republican hold. Successor resigned before Congress started, leading to a special election.	▌ ✓ William Wilson (Democratic-Republican) 32.5%; ▌ ✓ David Scott (Democratic-Republican) 31.5%; ▌William Buyers (Federalist) 14.8; ▌George Kremer (Democratic-Republican) 8.8%; ▌Roswell Wells (Federalist) 8.8%; ▌Charles Maus (Unknown) 3.5%
Pennsylvania 11	William Findley	Democratic-Republican	1802	Incumbent retired. Democratic-Republican hold.	▌ ✓ David Marchand (Democratic-Republican) 52.8%; ▌George Armstrong (Federalist) 47.2%
Pennsylvania 12	Aaron Lyle	Democratic-Republican	1808	Incumbent retired. Democratic-Republican hold.	▌ ✓ Thomas Patterson (Democratic-Republican) 87.2%; ▌John Hughes (Federalist) 12.8%
Pennsylvania 13	Isaac Griffin	Democratic-Republican	1813 (special)	Incumbent retired. Democratic-Republican hold.	▌ ✓ Christian Tarr (Democratic-Republican) 50.8%; ▌Presley C. Lane (Democratic-Republican) 19.7%; ▌Henry Heaton (Democratic-Republican) 14.2%; ▌Thomas McKibben (Democratic-Republican) 11.7%; ▌Thomas Hersey (Democratic-Republican) 3.6%
Pennsylvania 14	John Woods	Federalist	1814	Incumbent retired. Democratic-Republican gain.	▌ ✓ Henry Baldwin (Democratic-Republican) 61.6%; ▌Walter Lowrie (Democratic-Republican) 38.4%
Pennsylvania 15	Thomas Wilson	Democratic-Republican	1813 (special)	Incumbent retired. Democratic-Republican hold.	▌ ✓ Robert Moore (Democratic-Republican) 51.1%; ▌William Clark (Federalist) 48.9%

== Rhode Island ==
Rhode Island elected its members August 27, 1816.

District	Incumbent			This race	
District	Member	Party	First elected	Results	Candidates
Rhode Island at-large 2 seats on a general ticket	John L. Boss Jr.	Federalist	1814	Incumbent re-elected.	▌ ✓ John L. Boss Jr. (Federalist) 50.1%; ▌ ✓ James B. Mason (Federalist) 49.9%
Rhode Island at-large 2 seats on a general ticket	James B. Mason	Federalist	1814	Incumbent re-elected.	▌ ✓ John L. Boss Jr. (Federalist) 50.1%; ▌ ✓ James B. Mason (Federalist) 49.9%

== South Carolina ==
South Carolina elected its members October 14–15, 1816.

District	Incumbent			This race	
District	Member	Party	First elected	Results	Candidates
South Carolina 1 "Charleston district"	Henry Middleton	Democratic- Republican	1814	Incumbent re-elected.	▌ ✓ Henry Middleton (Democratic-Republican) 56.4%; ▌William Crafts Jr. (Federalist) 43.6%
South Carolina 2 "Beaufort district"	William Lowndes	Democratic- Republican	1810	Incumbent re-elected.	▌ ✓ William Lowndes (Democratic-Republican) 92.5%; Others 7.5%
South Carolina 3 "Georgetown district"	Benjamin Huger	Federalist	1798; 1804 (retired); 1814	Incumbent lost-re-election. Democratic-Republican gain	▌ ✓ James Ervin (Democratic-Republican) 54.8%; ▌Benjamin Huger (Federalist) 45.2%
South Carolina 4 "Orangeburgh district"	John J. Chappell	Democratic- Republican	1812	Incumbent lost-re-election. Democratic-Republican hold.	▌ ✓ Joseph Bellinger (Democratic-Republican) 47.2%; ▌John J. Chappell (Democratic-Republican) 31.6%; ▌John C. Allen (Democratic-Republican) 21.2%
South Carolina 5 "Newberry district"	William Woodward	Democratic- Republican	1814	Incumbent lost-re-election. Democratic-Republican hold.	▌ ✓ Starling Tucker (Democratic-Republican); ▌William Woodward (Democratic-Republican)
South Carolina 6 "Abbeville district"	John C. Calhoun	Democratic- Republican	1810	Incumbent re-elected.	▌ ✓ John C. Calhoun (Democratic-Republican) 43.2%; ▌Edmund Bacon (Federalist) 31.5%; ▌William Butler (Democratic-Republican) 25.3%
South Carolina 7 "Pendleton district"	John Taylor	Democratic- Republican	1814	Incumbent lost-re-election. Democratic-Republican hold.	▌ ✓ Elias Earle (Democratic-Republican) 50.7%; ▌Andrew Pickens (Democratic-Republican) 26.7%; ▌John Taylor (Democratic-Republican) 22.6%
South Carolina 8 "Chester district"	Thomas Moore	Democratic- Republican	1800; 1812 (retired); 1814	Incumbent retired. Democratic-Republican hold.	▌ ✓ Wilson Nesbitt (Democratic-Republican) 41.4%; ▌James MacKibben (Democratic-Republican) 32.3%; ▌William Smith (Democratic-Republican) 20.3%; ▌William Rice (Democratic-Republican) 5.9%
South Carolina 9 "Sumter district"	William Mayrant	Democratic- Republican	1814	Incumbent lost re-election. Democratic-Republican hold. Incumbent resigned October 21, 1816, leading to a special election, also won by Miller.	▌ ✓ Stephen D. Miller (Democratic-Republican) 73.6%; ▌William Mayrant (Democratic-Republican) 26.4%

== Tennessee ==
Tennessee elected its members August 7–8, 1817.

District	Incumbent			This race	
District	Member	Party	First elected	Results	Candidates
Tennessee 1	Samuel Powell	Democratic- Republican	1815	Incumbent retired. Democratic-Republican hold.	▌ ✓ John Rhea (Democratic-Republican) 63.9%; ▌Alexander Sevier (Democratic-Republican) 36.1%
Tennessee 2	William G. Blount	Democratic- Republican	1815 (special)	Incumbent re-elected.	▌ ✓ William G. Blount (Democratic-Republican) 61.8%; ▌John Cocke (Democratic-Republican) 38.2%
Tennessee 3	Isaac Thomas	Democratic- Republican	1815	Incumbent retired. Democratic-Republican hold.	▌ ✓ Francis Jones (Democratic-Republican) 35.2%; ▌James Rogers (Unknown) 24.7%; ▌Joseph Pickens (Unknown) 24.1%; ▌Queen Morton (Unknown) 16.0%
Tennessee 4	Bennett H. Henderson	Democratic- Republican	1815	Incumbent retired. Democratic-Republican hold.	▌ ✓ Samuel Hogg (Democratic-Republican) 63.5%; ▌Archibald Overton (Democratic-Republican) 36.5%
Tennessee 5	Newton Cannon	Democratic- Republican	1814 (special)	Incumbent lost-re-election. Democratic-Republican hold.	▌ ✓ Thomas Claiborne (Democratic-Republican) 47.6%; ▌Newton Cannon (Democratic-Republican) 28.5%; ▌Robert Weakley (Democratic-Republican) 23.9%
Tennessee 6	James B. Reynolds	Democratic- Republican	1815	Incumbent lost-re-election. Democratic-Republican hold.	▌ ✓ George W. L. Marr (Democratic-Republican) 46.5%; ▌Peter R. Booker (Unknown) 26.8%; ▌Thomas Johnson (Unknown) 19.3%; ▌James B. Reynolds (Democratic-Republican) 4.2%; ▌Samuel Goodridge (Unknown) 3.1%

== Vermont ==
Vermont elected its members September 3, 1816, replacing its six Federalists with six Democratic-Republicans.

District	Incumbent			This race	
District	Member	Party	First elected	Results	Candidates
Vermont at-large 6 seats on a general ticket	Daniel Chipman	Federalist	1814	Incumbent retired. Democratic-Republican gain.	▌ ✓ Mark Richards (Democratic-Republican) 9.2%; ▌ ✓ William Hunter (Democratic-Republican) 9.2%; ▌ ✓ Heman Allen (of Colchester) (Democratic-Republican) 9.1%; ▌ ✓ Orsamus Cook Merrill (Democratic-Republican) 9.1%; ▌ ✓ Samuel C. Crafts (Democratic-Republican) 9.1%; ▌ ✓ Charles Rich (Democratic-Republican) 9.1%; ▌Chauncey Langdon (Federalist) 7.6%; ▌Jonathan H. Hubbard (Federalist) 7.6%; ▌Phineas White (Federalist) 7.6%; ▌Asa Lyon (Federalist) 7.6%; ▌David Edmonds (Federalist) 7.6%; ▌Samuel Prentiss (Federalist) 7.5%
Vermont at-large 6 seats on a general ticket	Luther Jewett	Federalist	1814	Incumbent retired. Democratic-Republican gain.	
Vermont at-large 6 seats on a general ticket	Chauncey Langdon	Federalist	1814	Incumbent lost-re-election. Democratic-Republican gain.	
Vermont at-large 6 seats on a general ticket	Asa Lyon	Federalist	1814	Incumbent lost-re-election. Democratic-Republican gain.	
Vermont at-large 6 seats on a general ticket	Charles Marsh	Federalist	1814	Incumbent retired. Democratic-Republican gain.	
Vermont at-large 6 seats on a general ticket	John Noyes	Federalist	1814	Incumbent retired. Democratic-Republican gain.	

== Virginia ==
Virginia elected its members in April 1817.

District	Incumbent			This race	
District	Member	Party	First elected	Results	Candidates
Virginia 1	John G. Jackson	Democratic-Republican	1803; 1810 (resigned); 1813	Incumbent retired. Federalist gain.	▌ ✓ James Pindall (Federalist) 100%
Virginia 2	Magnus Tate	Federalist	1815	Incumbent retired. Federalist hold.	▌ ✓ Edward Colston (Federalist) 61.2%; ▌Daniel Morgan (Democratic-Republican) 30.9%; ▌Robert Bailey (Democratic-Republican) 7.9%
Virginia 3	Henry S. Tucker	Democratic-Republican	1815	Incumbent re-elected.	▌ ✓ Henry S. Tucker (Democratic-Republican) 67.8%; ▌William Carson (Democratic-Republican) 32.2%
Virginia 4	William McCoy	Democratic-Republican	1811	Incumbent re-elected.	▌ ✓ William McCoy (Democratic-Republican)
Virginia 5	James Breckinridge	Federalist	1809	Incumbent retired. Democratic-Republican gain.	▌ ✓ John Floyd (Democratic-Republican); ▌Elijah MacClannahan (Federalist)
Virginia 6	Daniel Sheffey	Federalist	1809	Incumbent retired. Democratic-Republican gain	▌ ✓ Alexander Smyth (Democratic-Republican) 67.0%; ▌Benjamin Estill (Federalist) 33.0%
Virginia 7	Ballard Smith	Democratic-Republican	1815	Incumbent re-elected.	▌ ✓ Ballard Smith (Democratic-Republican); ▌John Gray (Federalist)
Virginia 8	Joseph Lewis Jr.	Federalist	1803	Incumbent retired. Federalist hold.	▌ ✓ Charles F. Mercer (Federalist) 52.6%; ▌Armistead Mason (Democratic-Republican) 47.4%
Virginia 9	John Hungerford	Democratic-Republican	1813	Incumbent lost-re-election. Democratic-Republican hold.	▌ ✓ William Lee Ball (Democratic-Republican) 44.6%; ▌John Hungerford (Democratic-Republican) 40.9%; ▌Henry Lee Jr. (Federalist) 14.5%
Virginia 10	Aylett Hawes	Democratic-Republican	1811	Incumbent retired. Democratic-Republican hold.	▌ ✓ George Strother (Democratic-Republican); ▌John Shackleford (Federalist)
Virginia 11	Philip P. Barbour	Democratic-Republican	1814 (special)	Incumbent re-elected.	▌ ✓ Philip P. Barbour (Democratic-Republican)
Virginia 12	William H. Roane	Democratic-Republican	1815	Incumbent lost-re-election. Democratic-Republican hold.	▌ ✓ Robert S. Garnett (Democratic-Republican); ▌Edwin Upshaw (Democratic-Republican); ▌William H. Roane (Democratic-Republican)
Virginia 13	Burwell Bassett	Democratic-Republican	1815	Incumbent re-elected.	▌ ✓ Burwell Bassett (Democratic-Republican) 73.3%; ▌John Eyre (Federalist) 24.8%; ▌Major S. Pitts (Federalist) 1.9%
Virginia 14	William A. Burwell	Democratic-Republican	1813	Incumbent re-elected.	▌ ✓ William A. Burwell (Democratic-Republican)
Virginia 15	John Kerr	Democratic-Republican	1815 (special)	Incumbent retired. Democratic-Republican hold.	▌ ✓ William J. Lewis (Democratic-Republican) 100%
Virginia 16	John Randolph	Democratic-Republican	1799; 1813 (lost); 1815	Incumbent lost-re-election. Democratic-Republican hold.	▌ ✓ Archibald Austin (Democratic-Republican) 61.5%; ▌John Randolph (Democratic-Republican) 38.5%
Virginia 17	James Pleasants	Democratic-Republican	1811	Incumbent re-elected.	▌ ✓ James Pleasants (Democratic-Republican) 100%
Virginia 18	Thomas M. Nelson	Democratic-Republican	1816 (special)	Incumbent re-elected.	▌ ✓ Thomas M. Nelson (Democratic-Republican) 100%
Virginia 19	Peterson Goodwyn	Democratic-Republican	1803	Incumbent re-elected.	▌ ✓ Peterson Goodwyn (Democratic-Republican) 96.9%; ▌John Pegram (Democratic-Republican) 3.1%
Virginia 20	James Johnson	Democratic-Republican	1813	Incumbent re-elected.	▌ ✓ James Johnson (Democratic-Republican) 100%
Virginia 21	Thomas Newton Jr.	Democratic-Republican	1797	Incumbent re-elected.	▌ ✓ Thomas Newton Jr. (Democratic-Republican) 93.5%; ▌Littleton W. Tazewell (Democratic-Republican) 6.5%
Virginia 22	Hugh Nelson	Democratic-Republican	1811	Incumbent re-elected.	▌ ✓ Hugh Nelson (Democratic-Republican) 72.7%; ▌Thomas W. Maury (Democratic-Republican) 27.3%
Virginia 23	John Tyler	Democratic-Republican	1816 (special)	Incumbent re-elected.	▌ ✓ John Tyler (Democratic-Republican) 53.7%; ▌Andrew Stevenson (Democratic-Republican) 46.3%

== Non-voting delegates ==
There were three territories with the right to send delegates during at least part of the 15th Congress.

Illinois Territory also only existed during the 1st Session, as it was admitted to the Union as the State of Illinois on December 3, 1818.

Mississippi Territory only existed during the first few months of the 15th Congress, but did not elect a delegate, since it was admitted to the Union as a state a few days into the 1st Session of the 15th Congress.

There were two elections held for the delegate from Missouri Territory. The first was contested by Rufus Easton on the grounds of electoral fraud. This election was declared void, and a second election was held on August 4, 1817. It was won without controversy by John Scott, who took his seat on December 8, 1817.

District	Incumbent			This race	
District	Member	Party	First elected	Results	Candidates
Illinois Territory at-large	Benjamin Stephenson	Democratic- Republican	1814	Incumbent retired. New delegate elected September 5, 1816. Democratic-Republican hold.	▌ ✓ Nathaniel Pope (Democratic-Republican); ▌John Caldwell (Unknown)
Missouri Territory at-large	Rufus Easton	None	1814	Incumbent lost re-election. New delegate elected September 10, 1816 but challenged the result. Election was declared void January 13, 1817.	▌ ✓ John Scott (Democratic-Republican) 49.8%; ▌Rufus Easton (No party) 49.4%

== See also ==
- 14th United States Congress
- 15th United States Congress
- 1816 United States elections
  - List of United States House of Representatives elections (1789–1822)
  - 1816 United States presidential election
  - 1816–17 United States Senate elections

== Bibliography ==
- "A New Nation Votes: American Election Returns 1787–1825". Tufts Digital Library, Tufts University. Archived from the original on January 29, 2015.
- Carmony, Donald Francis (1998). Indiana 1816-1850: the Pioneer Era. Indianapolis: Indiana Historical Society. ISBN 0-87195-125-8.
- Dubin, Michael J. (March 1, 1998). 1788–1997 United States Congressional Elections: The Official Results of the Elections of the 1st Through 105th Congresses. McFarland and Company. ISBN 978-0786402830.
- Hill, Frederick D. (December 1974). "William Hendricks' Political Circulars to his Constituents: Congressional Period, 1816-1822". Indiana Magazine of History. 70 (4): 296–344. JSTOR 27789995.
- Lampi, Philip J. (2012a). "Indiana 1816 U.S. House of Representatives". A New Nation Votes. American Antiquarian Society.
- Lampi, Philip J. (2012b). "Indiana 1817 U.S. House of Representatives". A New Nation Votes. American Antiquarian Society.
- Martis, Kenneth C. (January 1, 1989). The Historical Atlas of Political Parties in the United States Congress, 1789–1989. Macmillan Publishing Company. ISBN 978-0029201701.
- Riker, Dorothy; Thornbrough, Gayle (1960). Indiana Election Returns: 1816-1851. Indianapolis: Indiana Historical Bureau.
- "Party Divisions of the House of Representatives* 1789–Present". Office of the Historian, United States House of Representatives.
- Mapping Early American Elections project team (2019). "Mapping Early American Elections". Roy Rosenzweig Center for History and New Media, George Mason University.
