= 1816 North Carolina's 8th congressional district special election =

On April 16, 1816, Richard Stanford (DR) of North Carolina's 8th district died in office. A special election was held to fill the resulting vacancy

== Election results ==
Candidate	Party	Votes	Percent
Samuel Dickens	Democratic-Republican	2,487	52.2%
John Craig	Democratic-Republican	2,273	47.8%

Dickens took his seat December 2, 1816, at the start of the Second Session of the 14th Congress.

== See also ==
- List of special elections to the United States House of Representatives
- 1816 and 1817 United States House of Representatives elections
- List of United States representatives from North Carolina
