= 1816 United States House of Representatives elections in New York =

United States House of Representatives elections in New York, 1816
- April 23–25, 1816

All 27 New York seats to the United States House of Representatives
	Majority party	Minority party
Party	Democratic-Republican	Federalist
Last election	21	6
Seats won	22	5
Seat change	▲1	▼1

The 1816 United States House of Representatives elections in New York were held from April 23 to 25, 1816, to elect 27 U.S. Representatives to represent the State of New York in the United States House of Representatives of the 15th United States Congress. At the same time, a vacancy was filled in the 14th United States Congress.

== Background ==
27 U.S. Representatives had been elected in April 1814 to a term in the 14th United States Congress beginning on March 4, 1815. Representative-elect Benjamin Pond died on October 6, 1814, and Asa Adgate was elected in April 1815 to fill the vacancy. Jonathan Fisk resigned his seat in March 1815, and James W. Wilkin was elected in April 1815 to fill the vacancy. John Adams and William S. Smith had been declared elected, and credentials issued by the Secretary of State of New York, but did not take or claim their seats. In December 1815, Erastus Root and Westel Willoughby, Jr. contested the former's elections, and were seated. Peter B. Porter resigned his seat on January 23, 1816, leaving a vacancy in the 21st District. The other 26 representatives' term would end on March 3, 1817. The congressional elections were held together with the State elections in late April 1816, about ten months before the term would start on March 4, 1817, and about a year and a half before Congress actually met on December 1, 1817.

== Congressional districts ==
The districts remained the same as at the previous elections in 1814.

- The 1st District (two seats) comprising the 1st and 2nd Ward of New York County, and Kings, Queens, Suffolk and Richmond counties.
- The 2nd District (two seats) comprising the other eight wards of New York County.
- The 3rd District comprising Westchester and Rockland counties.
- The 4th District comprising Dutchess County, except the towns of Rhinebeck and Clinton; and Putnam County.
- The 5th District comprising Columbia County; and Rhinebeck and Clinton in Dutchess County.
- The 6th District comprising Orange County.
- The 7th District comprising Ulster and Sullivan counties.
- The 8th District comprising Delaware and Greene counties.
- The 9th District comprising Albany County.
- The 10h District comprising Rensselaer County.
- The 11th District comprising Saratoga County.
- The 12th District (two seats) comprising Clinton, Essex, Franklin, Washington and Warren counties.
- The 13th District comprising Schenectady and Schoharie counties.
- The 14th District comprising Montgomery County.
- The 15th District (two seats) comprising Chenango, Broome and Otsego counties.
- The 16th District comprising Oneida County.
- The 17th District comprising Herkimer and Madison counties.
- The 18th District comprising St. Lawrence, Jefferson and Lewis counties.
- The 19th District comprising Onondaga and Cortland counties.
- The 20th District (two seats) comprising Tioga, Steuben, Cayuga and Seneca counties.
- The 21st District (two seats) comprising Ontario, Genesee, Allegany, Niagara and Chautauqua counties.

Note: There are now 62 counties in the State of New York. The counties which are not mentioned in this list had not yet been established, or sufficiently organized, the area being included in one or more of the abovementioned counties.

== Result ==
22 Democratic-Republicans and 5 Federalists were elected to the 15th Congress; and one Democratic-Republican to fill the vacancy in the 14th Congress. The incumbents Townsend, Irving, Wendover, Wilkin, Taylor, Savage and Comstock were re-elected; the incumbents Lovett, Throop and Brooks were defeated.

1816 United States House election result
District	Democratic-Republican		Federalist		Democratic-Republican		Federalist	
1st	George Townsend	3,798	Nathaniel Smith	3,268				
1st	Tredwell Scudder	3,781	Samuel Jones	3,267				
2nd	William Irving	5,225	Josiah Ogden Hoffman	3,792				
2nd	Peter H. Wendover	5,199	Isaac Ely	3,771				
3rd	Caleb Tompkins	1,787	Abraham Odell	1,347				
4th	Henry B. Lee	2,530	Henry A. Livingston	2,271				
5th	James I. Van Alen	2,208	Philip J. Schuyler	3,157				
6th	James W. Wilkin	1,613	James Burt	1,298				
7th	Josiah Hasbrouck	1,826	John Sudam	1,703				
8th	Dorrance Kirtland	2,252	Samuel Sherwood	1,752				
9th	Elisha Jenkins	1,418	Rensselaer Westerlo	2,180			John Lovett	277
10th	Thomas Turner	2,107	John P. Cushman	2,573				
11th	John W. Taylor	1,804	Elisha Powell	1,574				
12th	John Savage	4,597	Henry H. Ross	4,106				
12th	John Palmer	4,137	Zebulon R. Shipherd	4,071				
13th	Thomas Lawyer	2,145	William Beekman	1,760				
14th	John Herkimer	2,579	Richard Van Horne	2,495				
15th	Isaac Williams, Jr.	5,027	James Clapp	4,417				
15th	John R. Drake	5,019	James Hyde	4,416				
16th	Nathan Williams	2,540	Henry R. Storrs	2,818				
17th	Thomas H. Hubbard	3,128	Simeon Ford	2,939				
18th	Ela Collins	2,349	David A. Ogden	2,391				
19th	James Porter	2,789	James Geddes	2,244				
20th	Daniel Cruger	6,361	Elijah Miller	2,597	Enos T. Throop	1,271	Eleazer Lindsley	712
20th	Oliver C. Comstock	5,142	Benjamin Johnson	1,814				
21st	Benjamin Ellicott	8,765	Philip Church	6,152	Micah Brooks	670	Samuel Colt	73
21st	John C. Spencer	8,053	Graham Newell	6,071			Ebenezer F. Norton	39
21st Special	Archibald S. Clarke							

Note: The Anti-Federalists called themselves "Republicans." However, at the same time, the Federalists called them "Democrats" which was meant to be pejorative. After some time both terms got more and more confused, and sometimes used together as "Democratic Republicans" which later historians have adopted (with a hyphen) to describe the party from the beginning, to avoid confusion with both the later established and still existing Democratic and Republican parties.

== Aftermath and special elections ==
After being defeated for re-election, Enos T. Throop resigned his seat on June 4, 1816. A special election to fill the vacancy was held in September 1816, and was won by Daniel Avery, of the same party. Avery took his seat in the 14th United States Congress on December 3, 1816.

1816 United States House special election result
District	Democratic-Republican		Democratic-Republican	
20th	Daniel Avery	1,915	Charles Kellogg	1,641

Archibald S. Clarke took his seat in the 14th Congress on December 2, 1816.

Henry B. Lee, elected in the 4th District, died on February 18, 1817, before his congressional term began. A special election to fill the vacancy was held at the time of the annual State election in April 1817, and was won by James Tallmadge, Jr., of the same party.

1817 United States House special election result
District	Democratic-Republican		Federalist		Democratic-Republican	
4th	James Tallmadge, Jr.	1,457	Lemuel Clift	1,176	Abraham Adriance	421

The House of Representatives of the 15th United States Congress met for the first time at the Old Brick Capitol in Washington, D.C., on December 1, 1817, and 26 representatives took their seats. Only David A. Ogden arrived later, and took his seat on January 8, 1818.

== See also ==
- 1816 New York's 21st congressional district special election
- 1816 New York's 20th congressional district special election
- 1817 New York's 4th congressional district special election
- 1816 and 1817 United States House of Representatives elections
- List of United States representatives from New York

== Sources ==
- The New York Civil List compiled in 1858 (see: pg. 66 for district apportionment; pg. 70 for Congressmen)
- Members of the Fifteenth United States Congress
- Election result 1st D. at project "A New Nation Votes", compiled by Phil Lampi, hosted by Tufts University Digital Library
- Election result 2nd D. at "A New Nation Votes"
- Election result 3rd D. at "A New Nation Votes"
- Election result 4th D. at "A New Nation Votes"
- Election result 5th D. at "A New Nation Votes"
- Election result 6th D. at "A New Nation Votes"
- Election result 7th D. at "A New Nation Votes"
- Election result 8th D. at "A New Nation Votes"
- Election result 9th D. at "A New Nation Votes"
- Election result 10th D. at "A New Nation Votes"
- Election result 11th D. at "A New Nation Votes"
- Election result 12th D. at "A New Nation Votes"
- Election result 13th D. at "A New Nation Votes"
- Election result 14th D. at "A New Nation Votes"
- Election result 15th D. at "A New Nation Votes"
- Election result 16th D. at "A New Nation Votes"
- Election result 17th D. at "A New Nation Votes"
- Election result 18th D. at "A New Nation Votes"
- Election result 19th D. at "A New Nation Votes"
- Election result 20th D. at "A New Nation Votes"
- Election result 21st D. at "A New Nation Votes"
- Special election result 20th D. at "A New Nation Votes"
- 1817 special election result 4th D. at "A New Nation Votes"
