= 1817 Pennsylvania's 10th congressional district special election =

In the 1816 elections in Pennsylvania, David Scott (DR) won one of the two seats in the 10th district, but resigned before the 15th Congress began, having been appointed judge of the court of common pleas. A special election was held on October 14, 1817, to fill the resulting vacancy.

== Election results ==
Candidate	Party	Votes	Percent
John Murray	Democratic-Republican	8,333	71.0%
Abram Light	Federalist	3,411	29.0%

Murray took his seat on December 1, 1817, at the start of the 1st session of the 15th Congress

== See also ==
- List of special elections to the United States House of Representatives
