= North Carolina's 8th congressional district =

U.S. House district for North Carolina

Coordinates: 35.31°N 80.23°W

- Interactive map of district boundaries since January 3, 2025 (Note: As the mid-decade redistricting bill (S249) enacted on October 22, 2025 only changed the compositions of North Carolina's 1st and 3rd congressional districts, boundaries of other districts will not change at the 2026 elections.)
- Representative: Mark Harris; R–Indian Trail
- Population (2025): 800,101
- Median household income: $85,845
- Ethnicity: 60.8% White; 16.5% Black; 9.4% Hispanic; 5.5% Native American; 3.9% Two or more races; 3.6% Asian; 0.5% other
- Cook PVI: R+10

North Carolina's 8th congressional district is a congressional district that comprises a large portion of the southern Piedmont area of North Carolina The district includes all of Anson, Montgomery, Richmond, Scotland, Stanly, and Union counties as well as portions of Cabarrus, Mecklenburg, and Robeson counties.

The district is currently represented by Mark Harris, a member of the Republican Party.

Candidate filing began February 24, 2022, after the North Carolina Supreme Court approved a new map only used for the 2022 United States House of Representatives elections in North Carolina which then changed the 8th district boundaries to include Anson, Davidson, Montgomery, Rowan, Stanly and Union Counties and parts of Cabarrus and Richmond counties. After the North Carolina General Assembly approved a new congressional map, the district's Cook Partisan Voting Index shifted from R+20 to R+10. While the district is more Democratic than its previous iteration, it is still the most Republican district in North Carolina.

== Counties and communities ==
For the 119th and successive Congresses (based on the districts drawn following a 2023 legislative session), the district contains all or portions of the following counties and communities.

Anson County (7)

All seven communities

Cabarrus County (6)

Concord (part; also 6th), Harrisburg, Kannapolis (part; also 6th), Locust (shared with Stanly County), Midland, Mount Pleasant

Mecklenburg County (3)

Charlotte (part; also 12th and 14th), Matthews (part; also 12th), Mint Hill (part; also 12th)

Montgomery County (5)

All five communities

Richmond County (9)

All nine communities

Robeson County (14)

Barker Ten Mile (part; also 7th), Elrod, Fairmont, Lumberton (part; also 7th), Marietta, Maxton (shared with Scotland County), McDonald, Pembroke, Prospect, Raemon, Raynham, Red Springs, Rowland, Wakulla

Scotland County (8)

All eight communities

Stanly County (12)

All 12 communities

Union County (15)

All 15 communities

== Recent election results from statewide races ==
Year	Office	Results
2008	President	McCain 57% - 42%
2008	Senate	Dole 51% - 46%
2008	Governor	McCrory 59% - 39%
2010	Senate	Burr 62% - 36%
2012	President	Romney 59% - 41%
2012	Governor	McCrory 65% - 33%
2014	Senate	Tillis 57% - 39%
2016	President	Trump 58% - 38%
2016	Senate	Burr 59% - 37%
2016	Governor	McCrory 58% - 40%
2016	Lt. Governor	Forest 61% - 36%
2016	Secretary of State	LaPaglia 57% - 43%
2016	Auditor	Stuber 58% - 42%
2016	Treasurer	Folwell 61% - 39%
2016	Attorney General	Newton 58% - 42%
2020	President	Trump 58% - 40%
2020	Senate	Tillis 57% - 39%
2020	Governor	Forest 55% - 44%
2020	Lt. Governor	Robinson 60% - 40%
2020	Secretary of State	Sykes 57% - 43%
2020	Auditor	Street 58% - 42%
2020	Treasurer	Folwell 61% - 39%
2020	Attorney General	O'Neill 58% - 42%
2022	Senate	Budd 59% - 39%
2024	President	Trump 59% - 40%
2024	Governor	Robinson 48% - 47%
2024	Lt. Governor	Weatherman 56% - 42%
2024	Secretary of State	Brown 58% - 42%
2024	Auditor	Boliek 57% - 40%
2024	Treasurer	Briner 61% - 39%
2024	Attorney General	Bishop 57% - 43%

== List of members representing the district ==
Member (Residence)	Party	Years	Cong ress	Electoral history	District location
District established March 4, 1793
William J. Dawson (Bertie County)	Anti-Administration	March 4, 1793 – March 3, 1795	3rd	Elected in 1793. Lost re-election.	
Dempsey Burges (Camden County)	Democratic-Republican	March 4, 1795 – March 3, 1799	4th 5th	Elected in 1795. Re-elected in 1796. Lost re-election.	
David Stone (Bertie County)	Democratic-Republican	March 4, 1799 – March 3, 1801	6th	Re-elected in 1798. Re-elected in 1800. Declined to serve having also been elected U.S. senator.	
Vacant		March 4, 1801 – December 7, 1801	7th		
Charles Johnson (Bandon)	Democratic-Republican	December 7, 1801 – July 23, 1802	7th	Elected August 6, 1801, to finish Stone's term and seated December 7, 1801. Died.	
Vacant		July 23, 1802 – December 7, 1802	7th		
Thomas Wynns (Hertford County)	Democratic-Republican	December 7, 1802 – March 3, 1803	7th	Elected October 15, 1802, to finish Johnson's term and seated December 7, 1802. Redistricted to the 1st district.	
Richard Stanford (Hawfields)	Democratic-Republican	March 4, 1803 – April 9, 1816	8th 9th 10th 11th 12th 13th 14th	Redistricted from the 4th district and re-elected in 1803. Re-elected in 1804. Re-elected in 1806. Re-elected in 1808. Re-elected in 1810. Re-elected in 1813. Re-elected in 1815. Died.	1803–1813 "North Carolina congressional district map (1803–13)".
Vacant		April 9, 1816 – December 2, 1816	14th		1813–1843 "North Carolina congressional district map (1813–43)".
Samuel Dickens (Mount Tirzah)	Democratic-Republican	December 2, 1816 – March 3, 1817	14th	Elected to finish Stanford's term. Lost re-election.	1813–1843 "North Carolina congressional district map (1813–43)".
James S. Smith (Hillsboro)	Democratic-Republican	March 4, 1817 – March 3, 1821	15th 16th	Elected in 1817. Re-elected in 1819. Retired.	1813–1843 "North Carolina congressional district map (1813–43)".
Josiah Crudup (Raleigh)	Democratic-Republican	March 4, 1821 – March 3, 1823	17th	Elected in 1821. Retired.	1813–1843 "North Carolina congressional district map (1813–43)".
Willie P. Mangum (Red Mountain)	Democratic-Republican	March 4, 1823 – March 3, 1825	18th 19th	Elected in 1823. Re-elected in 1825. Resigned.	1813–1843 "North Carolina congressional district map (1813–43)".
Willie P. Mangum (Red Mountain)	Jacksonian	March 4, 1825 – March 18, 1826	18th 19th	Elected in 1823. Re-elected in 1825. Resigned.	1813–1843 "North Carolina congressional district map (1813–43)".
Vacant		March 18, 1826 – December 4, 1826	19th		1813–1843 "North Carolina congressional district map (1813–43)".
Daniel L. Barringer (Raleigh)	Jacksonian	December 4, 1826 – March 3, 1833	19th 20th 21st 22nd 23rd	Elected November 3, 1826, to finish Mangum's term and seated December 4, 1826. Re-elected in 1827. Re-elected in 1829. Re-elected in 1831. Re-elected in 1833. [data missing]	1813–1843 "North Carolina congressional district map (1813–43)".
Daniel L. Barringer (Raleigh)	Anti-Jacksonian	March 4, 1833 – March 3, 1835	19th 20th 21st 22nd 23rd	Elected November 3, 1826, to finish Mangum's term and seated December 4, 1826. Re-elected in 1827. Re-elected in 1829. Re-elected in 1831. Re-elected in 1833. [data missing]	1813–1843 "North Carolina congressional district map (1813–43)".
William Montgomery (Albrights)	Jacksonian	March 4, 1835 – March 3, 1837	24th 25th 26th	Elected in 1835. Re-elected in 1837. Re-elected in 1839. [data missing]	1813–1843 "North Carolina congressional district map (1813–43)".
William Montgomery (Albrights)	Democratic	March 4, 1837 – March 3, 1841	24th 25th 26th	Elected in 1835. Re-elected in 1837. Re-elected in 1839. [data missing]	1813–1843 "North Carolina congressional district map (1813–43)".
Romulus M. Saunders (Raleigh)	Democratic	March 4, 1841 – March 3, 1843	27th	Elected in 1841. Redistricted to the 5th district.	1813–1843 "North Carolina congressional district map (1813–43)".
Archibald Hunter Arrington (Hilliardston)	Democratic	March 4, 1843 – March 3, 1845	28th	Redistricted from the 6th district and re-elected in 1843. [data missing]	
Henry S. Clark (Washington)	Democratic	March 4, 1845 – March 3, 1847	29th	Elected in 1845. [data missing]	
Richard S. Donnell (New Bern)	Whig	March 4, 1847 – March 3, 1849	30th	Elected in 1847. [data missing]	
Edward Stanly (Washington)	Whig	March 4, 1849 – March 3, 1853	31st 32nd	Elected in 1849. Re-elected in 1851. [data missing]	
Thomas L. Clingman (Asheville)	Democratic	March 4, 1853 – May 7, 1858	33rd 34th 35th	Redistricted from the 1st district and re-elected in 1853. Re-elected in 1855. Re-elected in 1857. Resigned when appointed U.S. senator.	
Vacant		May 7, 1858 – December 7, 1858	35th		
Zebulon B. Vance (Asheville)	American	December 7, 1858 – March 3, 1861	35th 36th	Elected to finish Clingman's term. Re-elected in 1859. [data missing]	
Vacant		March 4, 1861 – July 20, 1868	37th 38th 39th 40th	Civil War and Reconstruction	
District dissolved July 6, 1868
District re-established March 4, 1873
Robert B. Vance (Hawfields)	Democratic	March 4, 1873 – March 3, 1885	43rd 44th 45th 46th 47th 48th	Elected in 1872. Re-elected in 1874. Re-elected in 1876. Re-elected in 1878. Re-elected in 1880. Re-elected in 1882. [data missing]	
William H. H. Cowles (Wilkesboro)	Democratic	March 4, 1885 – March 3, 1893	49th 50th 51st 52nd	Elected in 1884. Re-elected in 1886. Re-elected in 1888. Re-elected in 1890. [data missing]	
William H. Bower (Lenoir)	Democratic	March 4, 1893 – March 3, 1895	53rd	Elected in 1892. [data missing]	
Romulus Z. Linney (Taylorsville)	Republican	March 4, 1895 – March 3, 1901	54th 55th 56th	Elected in 1894. Re-elected in 1896. Re-elected in 1898. [data missing]	
E. Spencer Blackburn (Wilkesboro)	Republican	March 4, 1901 – March 3, 1903	57th	Elected in 1900. [data missing]	
Theodore F. Kluttz (Salisbury)	Democratic	March 4, 1903 – March 3, 1905	58th	Redistricted from the 7th district and re-elected in 1902. [data missing]	
E. Spencer Blackburn (Wilkesboro)	Republican	March 4, 1905 – March 3, 1907	59th	Elected in 1904. [data missing]	
Richard N. Hackett (Wilkesboro)	Democratic	March 4, 1907 – March 3, 1909	60th	Elected in 1906. [data missing]	
Charles H. Cowles (Wilkesboro)	Republican	March 4, 1909 – March 3, 1911	61st	Elected in 1908. [data missing]	
Robert L. Doughton (Laurel Springs)	Democratic	March 4, 1911 – March 3, 1933	62nd 63rd 64th 65th 66th 67th 68th 69th 70th 71st 72nd	Elected in 1910. Re-elected in 1912. Re-elected in 1914. Re-elected in 1916. Re-elected in 1918. Re-elected in 1920. Re-elected in 1922. Re-elected in 1924. Re-elected in 1926. Re-elected in 1928. Re-elected in 1930. Redistricted to the 9th district.	
Walter Lambeth (Thomasville)	Democratic	March 4, 1933 – January 3, 1939	73rd 74th 75th	Redistricted from the 7th district and re-elected in 1932. Re-elected in 1934. Re-elected in 1936. [data missing]	
William O. Burgin (Lexington)	Democratic	January 3, 1939 – April 11, 1946	76th 77th 78th 79th	Elected in 1938. Re-elected in 1940. Re-elected in 1942. Re-elected in 1944. Died.	
Vacant		April 11, 1946 – May 25, 1946	79th		
Eliza Pratt (Lexington)	Democratic	May 25, 1946 – January 3, 1947	79th	Elected to finish Burgin's term. [data missing]	
Charles B. Deane (Rockingham)	Democratic	January 3, 1947 – January 3, 1957	80th 81st 82nd 83rd 84th	Elected in 1946. Re-elected in 1948. Re-elected in 1950. Re-elected in 1952. Re-elected in 1954. [data missing]	
Alvin Paul Kitchin (Wadesboro)	Democratic	January 3, 1957 – January 3, 1963	85th 86th 87th	Elected in 1956. Re-elected in 1958. Re-elected in 1960. Lost re-election after redistricting.	
Charles R. Jonas (Lincolnton)	Republican	January 3, 1963 – January 3, 1969	88th 89th 90th	Redistricted from the 10th district and re-elected in 1962. Re-elected in 1964. Re-elected in 1966. Redistricted to the 9th district.	
Earl B. Ruth (Salisbury)	Republican	January 3, 1969 – January 3, 1975	91st 92nd 93rd	Elected in 1968. Re-elected in 1970. Re-elected in 1972. Lost re-election.	
Bill Hefner (Concord)	Democratic	January 3, 1975 – January 3, 1999	94th 95th 96th 97th 98th 99th 100th 101st 102nd 103rd 104th 105th	Elected in 1974. Re-elected in 1976. Re-elected in 1978. Re-elected in 1980. Re-elected in 1982. Re-elected in 1984. Re-elected in 1986. Re-elected in 1988. Re-elected in 1990. Re-elected in 1992. Re-elected in 1994. Re-elected in 1996. Retired.	
Robin Hayes (Concord)	Republican	January 3, 1999 – January 3, 2009	106th 107th 108th 109th 110th	Elected in 1998. Re-elected in 2000. Re-elected in 2002. Re-elected in 2004. Re-elected in 2006. Lost re-election.	
Larry Kissell (Biscoe)	Democratic	January 3, 2009 – January 3, 2013	111th 112th	Elected in 2008. Re-elected in 2010. Lost re-election.	2003–2013 2003–2013
Richard Hudson (Concord)	Republican	January 3, 2013 – January 3, 2023	113th 114th 115th 116th 117th	Elected in 2012. Re-elected in 2014. Re-elected in 2016. Re-elected in 2018. Re-elected in 2020. Redistricted to the 9th district.	2013–2017 2013–2017
Richard Hudson (Concord)	Republican	January 3, 2013 – January 3, 2023	113th 114th 115th 116th 117th	Elected in 2012. Re-elected in 2014. Re-elected in 2016. Re-elected in 2018. Re-elected in 2020. Redistricted to the 9th district.	2017–2021
Richard Hudson (Concord)	Republican	January 3, 2013 – January 3, 2023	113th 114th 115th 116th 117th	Elected in 2012. Re-elected in 2014. Re-elected in 2016. Re-elected in 2018. Re-elected in 2020. Redistricted to the 9th district.	2021–2023 Static map of 2021-3 congressional district
Dan Bishop (Waxhaw)	Republican	January 3, 2023 – January 3, 2025	118th	Redistricted from the 9th district and re-elected in 2022. Retired to run for attorney general of North Carolina.	2023–2025
Mark Harris (Indian Trail)	Republican	January 3, 2025 – present	119th	Elected in 2024. Re-elected in 2026.	2025–present

== Past election results ==
=== 2012 ===
2012 North Carolina's 8th congressional district election
Party	Candidate	Votes	%
Republican	Richard Hudson	160,695	53.2
Democratic	Larry Kissell (incumbent)	137,139	45.4
Independent	Antonio Blue (write-in)	3,990	1.3
N/A	Write-ins	456	0.1
Total votes		302,280	100.0
Republican gain from Democratic			

=== 2014 ===
2014 North Carolina's 8th congressional district election
Party	Candidate	Votes	%
Republican	Richard Hudson (incumbent)	121,568	64.9
Democratic	Antonio Blue	65,854	35.1
Total votes		187,422	100.0
Republican hold			

=== 2016 ===
2016 North Carolina's 8th congressional district election
Party	Candidate	Votes	%
Republican	Richard Hudson (incumbent)	189,863	58.8
Democratic	Thomas Mills	133,182	41.2
Total votes		323,045	100.0
Republican hold			

=== 2018 ===
2018 North Carolina's 8th congressional district election
Party	Candidate	Votes	%
Republican	Richard Hudson (incumbent)	141,402	55.3
Democratic	Frank McNeill	114,119	44.7
Total votes		255,521	100.0
Republican hold			

=== 2020 ===
2020 North Carolina's 8th congressional district election
Party	Candidate	Votes	%
Republican	Richard Hudson (incumbent)	202,774	53.3
Democratic	Patricia Timmons-Goodson	177,781	46.7
Total votes		380,555	100.0
Republican hold			

=== 2022 ===
2022 North Carolina's 8th congressional district election
Party	Candidate	Votes	%
Republican	Dan Bishop (incumbent)	183,998	69.91
Democratic	Scott Huffman	79,192	30.09
Total votes		263,190	100.00
Republican hold			

=== 2024 ===
2024 North Carolina's 8th congressional district election
Party	Candidate	Votes	%
Republican	Mark Harris	238,640	59.6
Democratic	Justin Dues	161,709	40.4
Total votes		400,349	100.0
Republican hold			

== See also ==
- List of United States congressional districts
- North Carolina's congressional districts
