= 1816 Georgia's at-large congressional district special election =

In December 1816, a special election was held in Georgia's at-large district to fill a vacancy left by the resignation of Alfred Cuthbert (DR) on November 9. Cuthbert himself had been elected in a special election in 1813.

== Election results ==
Candidate	Party	Votes	Percent
Zadock Cook	Democratic-Republican	1,167	39.5%
Thomas U.P. Charlton		1,130	38.3%
Moore		372	12.6%
Walker		285	9.6%

Cook took his seat in Congress on January 23, 1817.

== See also ==
- List of special elections to the United States House of Representatives
