= 1817 Connecticut's at-large congressional district special election =

A special election was held in Connecticut's at-large district in 1817 (Note: The exact election date is unknown but must have been held between the death of Backus on February 15, 1817 and the May 12, 1817 publication of a news story on the election.) to fill two vacancies in the 15th Congress, both of which had occurred before the start of that Congress. The vacancies were left by the death of members-elect Sylvanus Backus (F) on February 15, 1817, and Charles Dennison (F) who declined the seat.

== Election results ==
As there were two vacancies in an at-large district, the top two candidates were elected to represent Connecticut.

Candidate	Party	Votes	Percent
Ebenezer Huntington	Federalist	5,449	29.2%
Nathaniel Terry	Federalist	4,201	22.5%
Sylvester Gilbert	Democratic-Republican	3,115	16.7%
Lyman Law	Federalist	2,240	12.0%
Lewis B. Sturges	Federalist	1,829	9.8%
Epaphroditus Champion	Federalist	1,248	6.7%
Asa Bacon Jr.	Federalist	593	3.2%

Huntington and Terry took their seats with the rest of the 15th Congress.

== See also ==
- List of special elections to the United States House of Representatives
