= 1816 Maryland's 5th congressional district special elections =

The 1816 special elections for Maryland's 5th congressional district were to fill two separate vacancies. The 5th district was a plural district, with two seats. Both seats were vacated, the first by Representative Nicholas R. Moore (DR) in 1815, before the 14th Congress even met, and the second by Rep. William Pinkney (DR) on April 18, 1816, after being named Minister to Russia.

== Election results ==
=== January election ===
The first special election was held on January 27, 1816, to replace Moore.

Candidate	Party	Votes	Percent
Samuel Smith	Democratic-Republican	2,515	70.1%
Peter Little	Democratic-Republican	1,069	29.8%

Smith took his seat in the 14th Congress on February 4, 1816.

=== September election ===
The second election was held on September 3 to fill the vacancy left by Pickney's resignation.

Candidate	Party	Votes	Percent
Peter Little	Democratic-Republican	3,367	54.4%
Tobias Stansbury	Democratic-Republican	2,816	45.6%

Little took his seat on December 2, 1816, at the start of the Second Session.

== See also ==
- List of special elections to the United States House of Representatives
- 1816 and 1817 United States House of Representatives elections
