= 1816 North Carolina's 6th congressional district special election =

On December 15, 1815, having been elected to the Senate, Nathaniel Macon (DR) of North Carolina's 6th district resigned. To fill the vacancy left in North Carolina's representation for the 14th Congress, a special election was held on January 22, 1816.

== Election results ==
Candidate	Party	Votes	Percent
Weldon N. Edwards	Democratic-Republican	1,436	60.7%
William P. Little		931	39.3%

Edwards took his seat on February 7, 1816, during the First Session of the 14th Congress.

== See also ==
- List of special elections to the United States House of Representatives
- 1816 and 1817 United States House of Representatives elections
- List of United States representatives from North Carolina
