= James Strudwick Smith =

American politician (1787–1852)

James Strudwick Smith (September 8, 1787 – December 7, 1852) was a U.S. representative from North Carolina; born near Hillsboro, North Carolina, September 8, 1787; attended a private school near Hillsboro and Hillsboro Academy; was graduated from Jefferson Medical College, Philadelphia, Pennsylvania, in 1818, and practiced medicine near Hillsboro and later near Chapel Hill, North Carolina; elected as a Democratic-Republican to the Fifteenth and Sixteenth Congresses (March 4, 1817 – March 3, 1821); chairman, Committee on Accounts (Sixteenth Congress); unsuccessful candidate for renomination; resumed the practice of medicine; member of the State house of commons in 1821 and 1822; delegate to the State constitutional convention in 1835; died near Chapel Hill, N.C., December 7, 1852; interment in a private cemetery on his farm.

== See also ==
- Fifteenth United States Congress
- Sixteenth United States Congress

U.S. House of Representatives
Preceded by Samuel Dickens	Member of the U.S. House of Representatives from North Carolina's 8th congressional district 1817–1821	Succeeded by Josiah Crudup
