= 1816 New York's 21st congressional district special election =

A special election was held in New York's 21st congressional district April 30-May 2, 1816 to fill a vacancy left by the resignation of Peter B. Porter (DR) on January 23, 1816 after being appointed a Commissioner under the Treaty of Ghent. The special election was held at the same time as the general elections to the 15th Congress in New York.

== Election results ==
Candidate	Party	Votes	Percent
Archibald S. Clarke	Democratic-Republican	8,788	58.7%
Daniel W. Lewis	Federalist	6,171	41.3%

Clarke took his seat December 2, 1816

== See also ==
- List of special elections to the United States House of Representatives
- 1816 and 1817 United States House of Representatives elections
