= 1816 Massachusetts's 11th congressional district special election =

A special election was held in Massachusetts's 11th congressional district on August 26, 1816, to fill a vacancy left by the death of Elijah Brigham (F) on February 22, 1816.

== Election results ==
Candidate	Party	Votes	Percent
Benjamin Adams	Federalist	1,975	66.3%
Abraham Lincoln	Democratic-Republican	1,002	33.7%

Adams took his seat December 2, 1816 and was also elected in the November elections.

== See also ==
- List of special elections to the United States House of Representatives
