= 1816 Connecticut lieutenant gubernatorial election =

1816 election in Connecticut

- April 8, 1816

Nominee	Jonathan Ingersoll	Calvin Goddard
Party	Democratic-Republican	Federalist
Popular vote	10,494	8,635
Percentage	53.70%	44.20%
Lieutenant Governor before election
Vacant
Elected Lieutenant Governor
Jonathan Ingersoll
Democratic-Republican

The 1816 Connecticut lieutenant gubernatorial election was held on April 8, 1816, in order to elect the lieutenant governor of Connecticut. Democratic-Republican candidate Jonathan Ingersoll defeated Federalist candidate Calvin Goddard.

== General election ==
On election day, April 8, 1816, Democratic-Republican candidate Jonathan Ingersoll won the election by a margin of 1,859 votes against his opponent Federalist candidate Calvin Goddard, thereby gaining Democratic-Republican control over the office of lieutenant governor. Ingersoll was sworn in as the 29th lieutenant governor of Connecticut on May 9, 1816.

=== Results ===
Connecticut lieutenant gubernatorial election, 1816
Party	Candidate	Votes	%
Democratic-Republican	Jonathan Ingersoll	10,494	53.70
Federalist	Calvin Goddard	8,635	44.20
	Scattering	406	2.10
Total votes		19,535	100.00
Democratic-Republican gain from Federalist			
