= 1816 Virginia gubernatorial election =

- December 10, 1816
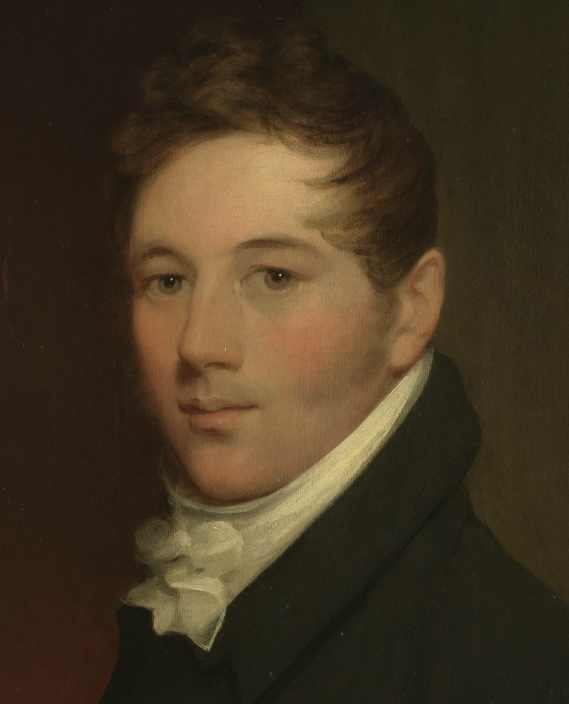

| Nominee | James Patton Preston | William J. Lewis |
| 1st ballot | 104 | 83 |
Governor before election
Wilson Cary Nicholas
Democratic-Republican
Elected Governor
James Patton Preston
Democratic-Republican (Note: Lampi lists no parties for this election. Both Kallenbach and Kallenbach and Sobel and Raimo list Preston as a Democratic-Republican during his tenure.)

A gubernatorial election was held in Virginia on December 10, 1816. The member of the Virginia House of Delegates from Montgomery County James Patton Preston defeated the member from Campbell County William J. Lewis and the former member from Greenbrier County Linah Mimms.

The incumbent governor of Virginia Wilson Cary Nicholas was not a candidate for re-election. The election was conducted by the Virginia General Assembly in joint session. Preston was elected with a majority on the first ballot.

== General election ==
1816 Virginia gubernatorial special election
| Candidate | First ballot | |
| Candidate | Count | Percent |
|---|---|---|
| James Patton Preston | 104 | 52.79 |
| William J. Lewis | 83 | 42.13 |
| Linah Mimms | 9 | 4.57 |
| Others | 1 | 0.51 |
| Total | 197 | 100.00 |

== Bibliography ==
- Kallenbach, Joseph E.; Kallenbach, Jessamine S. (1977). American State Governors, 1776–1976. Vol. 1. Dobbs Ferry, NY: Oceana Publications.
- Lampi, Philip J. (2012). "Virginia 1816 Governor". A New Nation Votes. American Antiquarian Society.
- Sobel, Robert; Raimo, John (1978). Biographical Directory of the Governors of the United States 1789–1978. Vol. 4. Westport, CT: Meckler Books.
- Virginia (1816). Journal of the House of Delegates [...]. Richmond.
- Virginia (1916). Twelfth Annual Report of the Library Board of the Virginia State Library [...]. Richmond.
