= 1815 Pennsylvania's 9th congressional district special election =

On March 12, 1815, a few days after the legal start of the 14th Congress, but long before the first meeting of that Congress, David Bard (DR), who'd been re-elected to the 9th district, died. A special election was held on October 10 to fill the vacancy left by his death.

== Election results ==
Candidate	Party	Votes	Percent
Thomas Burnside	Democratic-Republican	2,757	76.1%
John Bratton	Federalist	865	24.9%

The 9th district did not change parties with this election. On December 11, Burnside took his seat in the 14th Congress. He would subsequently resign, in April, 1816, to accept a judicial position, resulting in a second special election. He thus served for only a few months as Representative.

== See also ==
- List of special elections to the United States House of Representatives
