= 1816 Massachusetts gubernatorial election =

- April 11, 1816
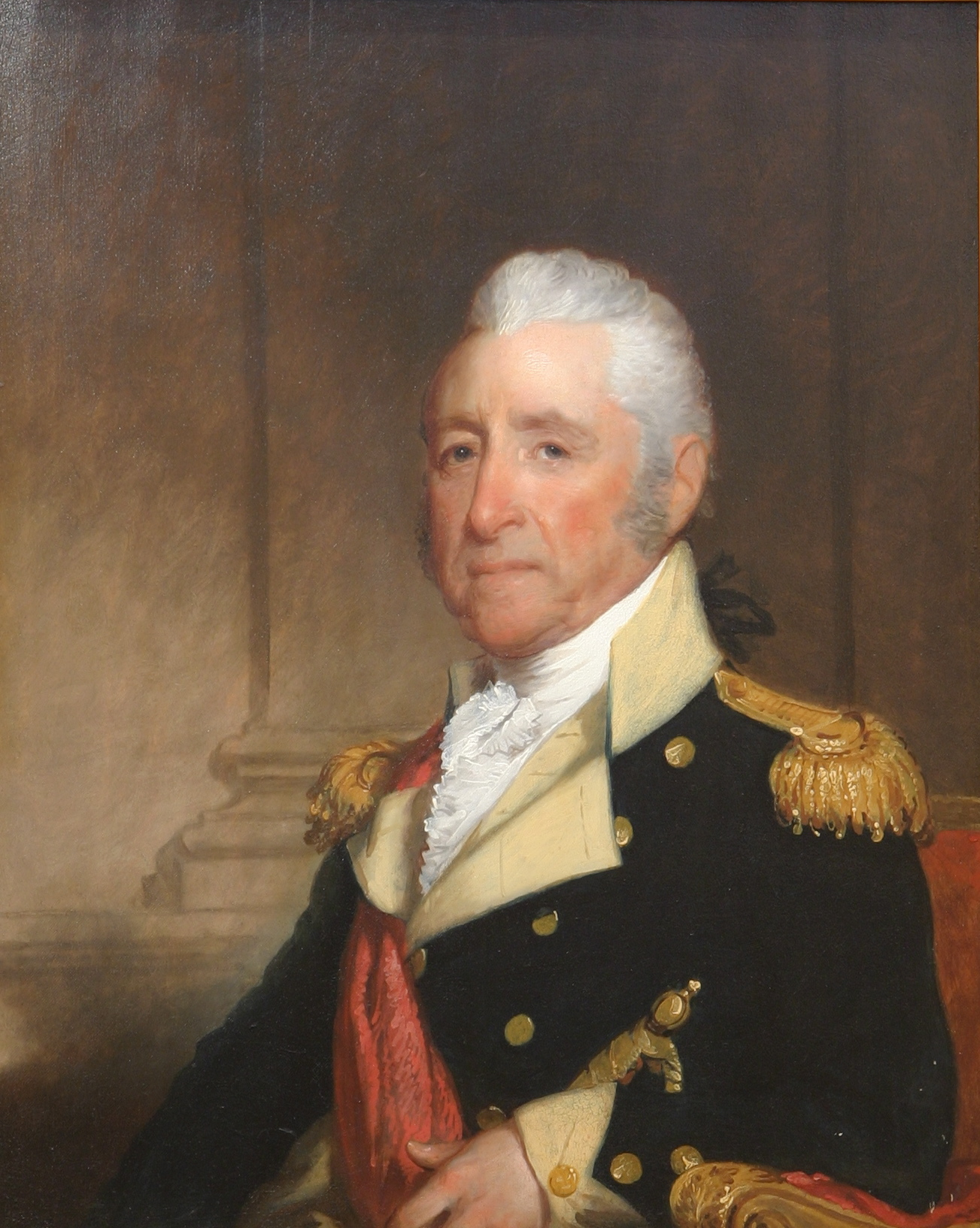

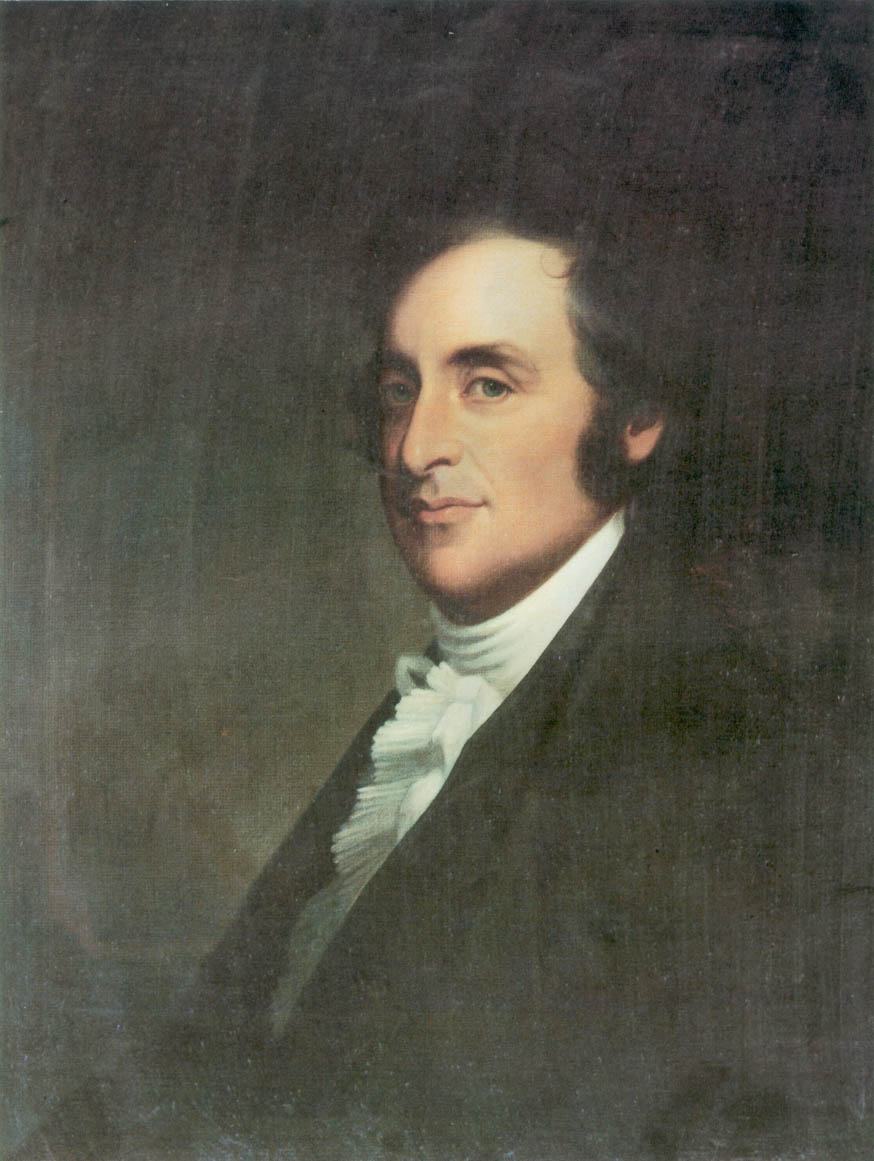
Nominee	John Brooks	Samuel Dexter
Party	Federalist	Democratic-Republican
Popular vote	49,527	47,321
Percentage	51.08%	48.80%
- County results Brooks: 50–60% 60–70% 80–90% Dexter: 50–60% 60–70% No data/vote
Governor before election
Caleb Strong
Federalist
Elected Governor
John Brooks
Federalist

The 1816 Massachusetts gubernatorial election was held on April 11, 1816, in order to elect the Governor of Massachusetts. Federalist candidate John Brooks defeated Democratic-Republican candidate Samuel Dexter.

== General election ==
On election day, April 11, 1816, Federalist candidate John Brooks won the election by a margin of 2,206 votes against his opponent Democratic-Republican candidate Samuel Dexter, thereby retaining Federalist control over the office of governor. Brooks was sworn in as the 11th governor of Massachusetts on May 30, 1816.

=== Results ===
Massachusetts gubernatorial election, 1816
Party	Candidate	Votes	%
Federalist	John Brooks	49,527	51.08%
Democratic-Republican	Samuel Dexter	47,321	48.80%
	Scattering	122	0.12%
Total votes		96,970	100.00%
Federalist hold			
