= 1816 Maryland's 3rd congressional district special election =

A special election was held in Maryland's 3rd congressional district in 1816 to fill a vacancy left by the resignation of Alexander C. Hanson (F) upon being elected to the United States Senate.

== Election results ==
Candidate	Party	Votes	Percent
George Peter	Federalist	1,849	45.5%
Charles Kilgour	Federalist	1,255	30.9%
Nicholas Snethen	Democratic-Republican	954	23.5%

George Peter was seated on December 2, 1816.

== See also ==
- List of special elections to the United States House of Representatives
