= 1816 Virginia's 18th congressional district special election =

On July 4, 1816, Representative Thomas Gholson, Jr. (DR) of Virginia's 18th district died in office. A special election was held to fill the resulting vacancy on October 10, 21–23, and 28, 1816 (each of the three districts within the 18th district held their election on a different day).

== Election results ==
| Candidate | Party | Votes | Percent |
|---|---|---|---|
| Thomas M. Nelson | Democratic-Republican | 625 | 55.0% |
| James J. Harrison | Federalist | 512 | 45.0% |

Nelson took his seat on December 4, 1816, at the start of the 2nd session of the 14th Congress.

== See also ==
- List of special elections to the United States House of Representatives
