= Nathaniel Terry =

American politician (1768–1844)

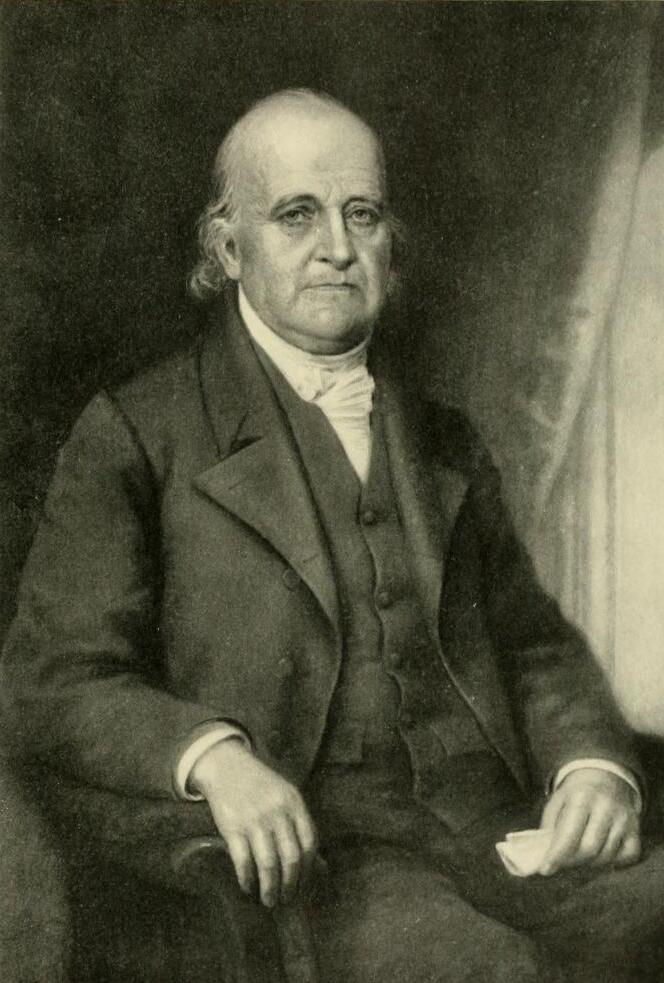

4th Mayor of Hartford, Connecticut
- In office November 22, 1824 – March 28, 1831
- Preceded by: Jonathan Brace
- Succeeded by: Thomas Scott Williams

Member of the U.S. House of Representatives from Connecticut's at-large district
- In office March 4, 1817 – March 3, 1819
- Preceded by: John Davenport
- Succeeded by: James Stevens

Judge of the Hartford County Court
- In office 1807–1809

Member of the Connecticut House of Representatives
- In office 1804–1815

Commander of the Governor's Foot Guard
- In office 1802–1813

Personal details
- Born: Nathaniel Terry Jr. January 30, 1768 Enfield, Connecticut Colony, British America
- Died: June 14, 1844 (aged 76) New Haven, Connecticut, U.S.
- Resting place: Old North (Spring Grove) Cemetery, Hartford, Connecticut, U.S.
- Party: Whig
- Other political affiliations: Federalist
- Spouse: Catharine Wadsworth (m. 1774)
- Children: 8
- Parent(s): Nathaniel Terry Sr. Abiah Dwight
- Education: Dartmouth College; Yale College
- Occupation: Politician, lawyer, judge

Nathaniel Terry Jr. (January 30, 1768 – June 14, 1844) was an American politician, lawyer, and judge who served a single term in the United States House of Representatives, representing the at-large congressional district of Connecticut from 1817 to 1819 as a member of the Federalist Party. He previously served in the Connecticut House of Representatives from 1804 to 1815 and subsequently served as the fourth mayor of Hartford, Connecticut, from 1824 to 1831.

== Early life and education ==
Terry was born in Enfield, Connecticut, on January 30, 1768, to Nathaniel Terry Sr. and Abiah (née Dwight) Terry. He attended common schools and Dartmouth College.

Terry graduated from Yale College in 1786. He studied law.

== Career ==
Terry was admitted to the bar in 1790; he commenced practice in Enfield.

In 1796, Terry moved to Hartford, Connecticut, where he served as commander of the Governor's Foot Guard from 1802 to 1813. Terry also served as a judge of the Hartford County Court from 1807 to his resignation in 1809.

Terry served in the Connecticut House of Representatives from 1804 to 1815.

Terry served a single term in the United States House of Representatives, representing the at-large congressional district of Connecticut from 1817 to 1819 as a member of the Federalist Party. He served in the 15th United States Congress; his tenure began on March 4, 1817, and concluded on March 3, 1819.

Terry was a member of the Connecticut state constitutional convention in 1818. He served as president of the Hartford Fire Insurance Company from 1810 to 1835. Additionally, he served as president of the Hartford Bank from 1819 to 1828.

Terry served as the fourth mayor of Hartford, Connecticut, from November 22, 1824, to March 28, 1831. He served in this position as a member of the Whig Party.

Terry also served as a general in the Connecticut State Militia.

== Personal life and death ==
Terry married Catharine Wadsworth in Hartford, Connecticut, on March 14, 1798. They had eight children together.

Terry died at the age of 76 in New Haven, Connecticut, on June 14, 1844. He was buried in Old North (Spring Grove) Cemetery, located in Hartford.

New Jersey General Assembly
| Preceded by — | Member of the Connecticut House of Representatives; 1804–1815 | Succeeded by — |
U.S. House of Representatives
| Preceded by John Davenport | Member of the U.S. House of Representatives from Connecticut's at-large congressional district 1817–1819 | Succeeded by James Stevens |
Political offices
| Preceded by Jonathan Brace | Mayor of Hartford, Connecticut; 1824–1831 | Succeeded by Thomas Scott Williams |
