= 1813 Georgia's at-large congressional district special election =

A special election was held in Georgia's at-large congressional district on December 13, 1813 to fill a vacancy left by the resignation of William W. Bibb (DR) on November 6, 1813, after being elected to the Senate.

== Election results ==
Candidate	Party	Votes	Percent
Alfred Cuthbert	Democratic-Republican	2,251	36.0%
Benjamin Skrine		1,512	24.2%
William Terrell	Democratic-Republican	1,263	20.2%
John Dooly		1,233	19.7%

Cuthbert took his seat on February 7, 1814

== See also ==
- List of special elections to the United States House of Representatives
