= 1817 New York's 4th congressional district special election =

On September 16, 1816, Representative-elect Henry B. Lee (DR) of New York's 4th district died before the start of the 15th Congress, to which he had been elected. A special election was held prior to the beginning of the first session of Congress to fill the resulting vacancy.

== Special election ==
| Candidate | Party | Votes | Percent |
|---|---|---|---|
| James Tallmadge, Jr. | Democratic-Republican | 1,457 | 47.7% |
| Lemuel Clift | Federalist | 1,176 | 38.5% |
| Abraham Adriance | Democratic-Republican | 421 | 13.8% |

Tallmadge took his seat on December 1, at the start of the First Session of the 15th Congress.

== See also ==
- List of special elections to the United States House of Representatives
