= Richard Stanford (American politician) =

American politician

Dean of the United States House of Representatives
- In office December 13, 1815 – April 9, 1816
- Preceded by: Nathaniel Macon
- Succeeded by: John Davenport

Member of the U.S. House of Representatives from North Carolina
- In office March 4, 1797 – April 9, 1816
- Preceded by: William F. Strudwick
- Succeeded by: Samuel Dickens
- Constituency: 4th district (1797–1803); 8th district (1803–1816)

Personal details
- Born: March 2, 1767 Vienna, Maryland, U.S.
- Died: April 9, 1816 (aged 49) Georgetown, Washington, D.C., U.S.
- Party: Democratic-Republican

Richard Stanford (March 2, 1767 – April 9, 1816) was a Democratic-Republican U.S. Congressman from North Carolina between 1797 and 1816.

== Biography ==
Born near Vienna, Maryland in 1767, Stanford moved to Hawfields, North Carolina, around 1793 and established an academy. He was elected to Congress as a Democratic-Republican in 1796 and was re-elected nine times before his death in Georgetown in 1816. During the 13th Congress, Stanford chaired the Committee on Revisal and Unfinished Business. He is buried in the Congressional Cemetery.

Stanford was the grandfather of Tennessee Senator William Robert Webb.

== See also ==
- List of members of the United States Congress who died in office (1790–1899)

U.S. House of Representatives
| Preceded by William F. Strudwick | Member of the U.S. House of Representatives from North Carolina's 4th congressional district 1797–1803 | Succeeded by William Blackledge |
| Preceded by Thomas Wynns | Member of the U.S. House of Representatives from North Carolina's 8th congressional district 1803–1816 | Succeeded by Samuel Dickens |
