= 1816 Pennsylvania's 9th congressional district special election =

On October 8, 1816, a special election was held in Pennsylvania's 9th district, the second special election in that district in the 14th Congress. The reason for the special election was Thomas Burnside (DR)'s resignation to accept a judicial appointment in April of that year. Burnside himself had been elected to the seat in the previous special election.

== Election results ==
| Candidate | Party | Votes | Percent |
|---|---|---|---|
| William P. Maclay | Democratic-Republican | 2,169 | 68.5% |
| James Banks | Democratic-Republican | 999 | 31.% |

Maclay took his seat December 3, 1816, at the start of the 2nd session of the 14th Congress

== See also ==
- List of special elections to the United States House of Representatives
