= 1816 Ohio's 1st congressional district special election =

In April, 1816, John McLean (DR) of Ohio's 1st district resigned. A special election was called to fill the resulting vacancy.

== Election results ==
Candidate	Party	Votes	Percent
William Henry Harrison	Democratic-Republican	3,370	58.6%
Thomas R. Ross	Democratic-Republican	1,783	31.0%
William C. Schenck	Federalist	351	6.1%
William Corry	Federalist	112	1.9%
Matthias Ross	Democratic-Republican	91	1.6%
Ethan A. Brown	Democratic-Republican	40	0.7%

Harrison took his seat on December 2, 1816

== See also ==
- List of special elections to the United States House of Representatives
