= Samuel Dickens (politician) =

American politician

Member of the U.S. House of Representatives from North Carolina's 8th district
- In office December 2, 1816 – March 3, 1817
- Preceded by: Richard Stanford
- Succeeded by: James Strudwick Smith

Member of the North Carolina House of Representatives
- In office 1818
- In office 1813–1815

Personal details
- Born: 1775 near Roxboro, North Carolina, U.S.
- Died: July 22, 1840 (aged 64–65) Madison County, Tennessee, U.S.
- Party: Democratic-Republican

Samuel Dickens (ca. 1775 – July 22, 1840) was a U.S. representative from North Carolina; born near Roxboro in Person County, North Carolina around 1775. He was a member of the North Carolina state house of commons from 1813 to 1815, and in 1818. He was elected as a Democratic-Republican to the Fourteenth Congress to fill the vacancy caused by the death of United States Representative Richard Stanford (December 2, 1816 – March 3, 1817). He moved to Madison County, Tennessee in 1820 and died there in 1840.

== See also ==
- Fourteenth United States Congress

U.S. House of Representatives
Preceded by Richard Stanford	Member of the U.S. House of Representatives from North Carolina's 8th congressional district 1816–1817	Succeeded by James S. Smith
