= 1816 Kentucky's 1st congressional district special election =

In April 1816, James Clark (DR), of Kentucky's 1st district, resigned his seat to accept a position as circuit court judge. A special election was held for his replacement.

== Election results ==
| Candidate | Party | Votes | Percent |
|---|---|---|---|
| Thomas Fletcher | Democratic-Republican | 3,416 | 58.9% |
| Chilton Allan | Democratic-Republican | 2,380 | 41.1% |

Fletcher took his seat on December 2, at the start of the second session of the 14th Congress.

== See also ==
- List of special elections to the United States House of Representatives
