= Zadock Cook =

American politician

- Born: February 18, 1769; Virginia
- Died: August 3, 1863 (aged 94); Near Watkinsville, Georgia
- Occupation: United States representative
- Political party: Democratic-Republican

Zadock Cook (February 18, 1769 – August 3, 1863) was a United States representative from Georgia.

== Biography ==
He was born in Virginia and moved to Hancock County, Georgia in early life. He was one of the first white settlers in Clarke County, Georgia. He was self-educated. He served as an ensign in the Washington County Militia in 1793 and a captain of the Eleventh Company, Hancock County Militia, in 1796.

Cook was member of the Georgia House of Representatives in 1806, 1807, and again in 1822. He served in the Georgia Senate 1810–1814, 1823, and 1824. He was elected as a Republican to the 14th United States Congress to fill the vacancy caused by the resignation of Alfred Cuthbert. He was reelected to the 15th Congress and served from December 2, 1816, to March 3, 1819. He retired from public life and settled on his plantation near Watkinsville, Georgia and engaged in agricultural pursuits until his death in 1863. He was buried in Jackson Cemetery, Clarke (now Oconee) County, Georgia. He was also a slave owner.

U.S. House of Representatives
| Preceded by Alfred Cuthbert | Member of the U.S. House of Representatives from Georgia's at-large congressional district December 2, 1816 – March 3, 1819 | Succeeded by John Alfred Cuthbert |
