= 1816 New York's 20th congressional district special election =

On June 4, 1816, after being defeated for re-election, Enos T. Throop (DR) of New York's 20th district resigned his seat. A special election was held in September of that year to fill the vacancy left for the remainder of the 14th Congress

== Election results ==
Candidate	Party	Votes	Percent
Daniel Avery	Democratic-Republican	1,915	52.8%
Charles Kellogg	Democratic-Republican	1,641	45.2%
Others		73	2.0%

Avery assumed his seat December 3

== See also ==
- List of special elections to the United States House of Representatives
