= 1814–15 United States House of Representatives elections =

House elections for the 14th U.S. Congress

- April 26, 1814 – August 10, 1815 (Note: Excludes states admitted during the 14th Congress)

All 182 (Note: Includes late elections) seats in the United States House of Representatives 92 seats needed for a majority
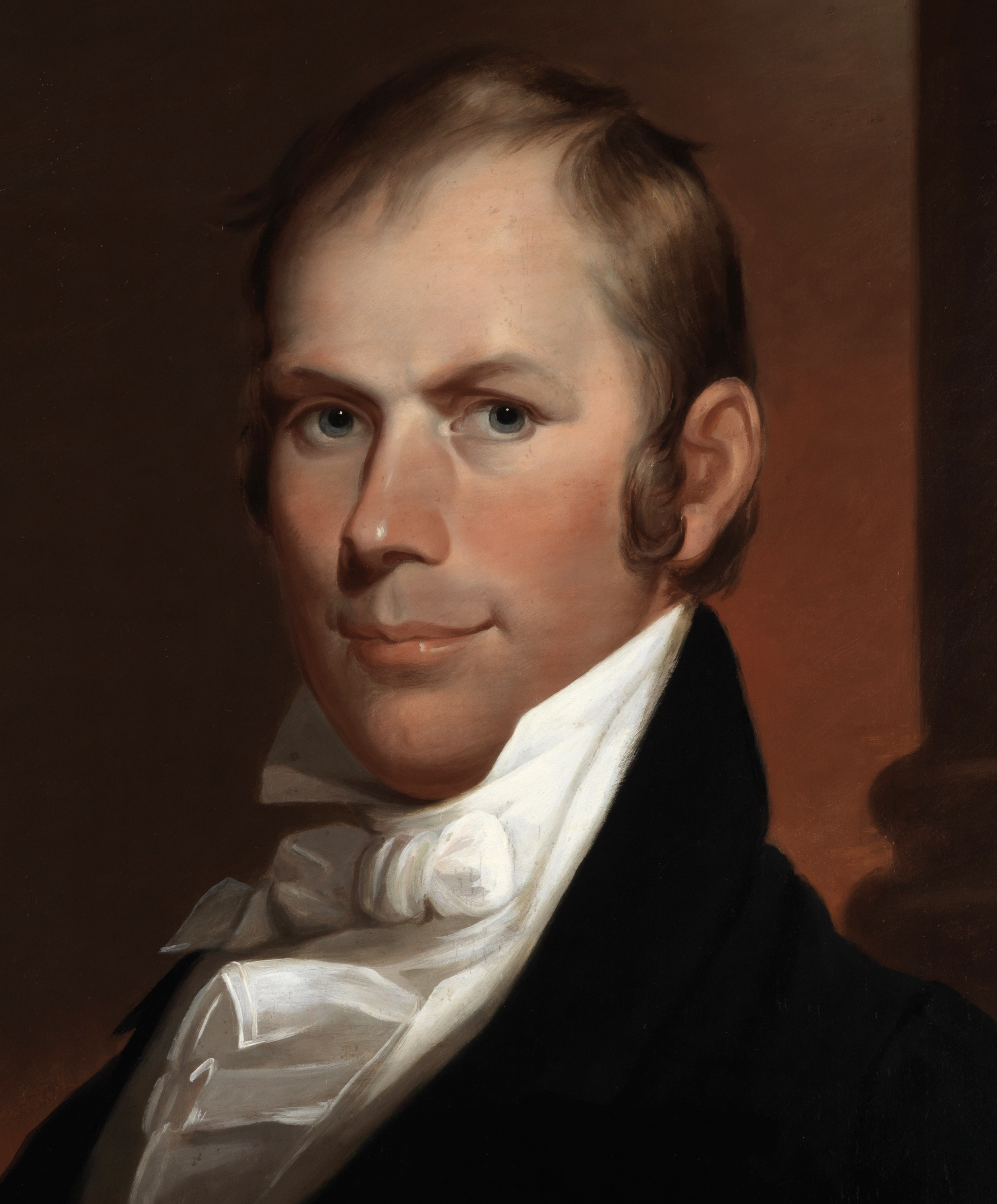

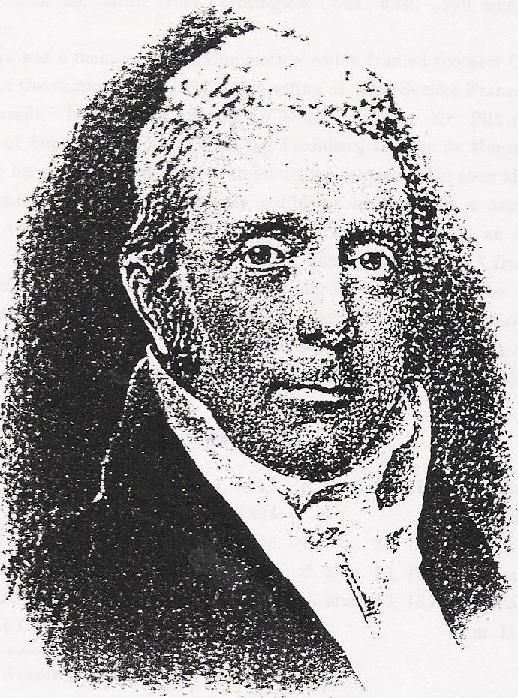
| | Majority party | Minority party |
|---|---|---|
| Leader | Henry Clay | Timothy Pitkin |
| Party | Democratic-Republican | Federalist |
| Leader's seat | Kentucky 2 | Connecticut at-large |
| Last election | 114 seats | 68 seats |
| Seats won | 118 | 64 |
| Seat change | ▲4 | ▼4 |
Speaker before election
Langdon Cheves
Democratic-Republican
Elected Speaker
Henry Clay
Democratic-Republican

The 1814–15 United States House of Representatives elections were held on various dates in various states between April 26, 1814, and August 10, 1815. Each state set its own date for its elections to the House of Representatives before the first session of the 14th United States Congress convened on December 4, 1815. They occurred during President James Madison's second term. Elections were held for all 182 seats, representing 18 states.

Though several were held after the conflict had ended, most elections took place towards the end of the War of 1812, which was extremely unpopular in certain regions, particularly New England. The failed American invasion of Upper Canada (Ontario) and the 1814 Burning of Washington were embarrassing military setbacks, but the Democratic-Republican Party remained dominant and the declining Federalist Party was unable to convert war opposition into political gain.

This election marked the first in American history where the incumbent president's party gained House seats in a midterm election while still losing seats in the Senate; this happened again in 1822 and 1902.

== Election summaries ==
↓
| 118 | 64 |
| Democratic-Republican | Federalist |

| State | Type | Date | Total seats | Democratic- Republican | | Federalist | |
| State | Type | Date | Total seats | Seats | Change | Seats | Change |
|---|---|---|---|---|---|---|---|
| New York | Districts | April 26–28, 1814 | 27 | 21 | ▲12 | 6 | ▼12 |
| Louisiana | At-large | July 4–6, 1814 | 1 | 1 | Steady | 0 | Steady |
| Kentucky | Districts | August 3, 1814 | 10 | 10 | Steady | 0 | Steady |
| New Hampshire | At-large | August 29, 1814 | 6 | 0 | Steady | 6 | Steady |
| Rhode Island | At-large | August 30, 1814 | 2 | 0 | Steady | 2 | Steady |
| Vermont | At-large | September 6, 1814 | 6 | 0 | ▼6 | 6 | ▲6 |
| Connecticut | At-large | September 19, 1814 | 7 | 0 | Steady | 7 | Steady |
| Georgia | At-large | October 3, 1814 | 6 | 6 | Steady | 0 | Steady |
| Maryland | Districts | October 3, 1814 | 9 | 4 | ▼2 | 5 | ▲2 |
| Delaware | At-large | October 4, 1814 | 2 | 0 | Steady | 2 | Steady |
| New Jersey | At-large | October 10–11, 1814 | 6 | 6 | ▲4 | 0 | ▼4 |
| South Carolina | Districts | October 10–11, 1814 | 9 | 8 | ▼1 | 1 | ▲1 |
| Ohio | Districts | October 11, 1814 | 6 | 6 | Steady | 0 | Steady |
| Pennsylvania | Districts | October 11, 1814 | 23 | 18 | ▼4 | 5 | ▲4 |
| Massachusetts | Districts | November 7, 1814 (Note: Massachusetts law required a majority vote for election, which was not met in two districts, requiring a second election, held on January 6, 1815.) | 20 | 2 | ▼2 | 18 | ▲2 |
Late elections (After the March 4, 1815 beginning of the term)
| Virginia | Districts | April 1815 | 23 | 19 | ▲2 | 4 | ▼2 |
| Tennessee | Districts | August 3–4, 1815 | 6 | 6 | Steady | 0 | Steady |
| North Carolina | Districts | August 10, 1815 | 13 | 11 | ▲1 | 2 | ▼1 |
| Total | | | 182 | 118 64.8% | ▲4 | 64 35.2% | ▼4 |

House seats
| Dem-Republican | 65.03% |
| Federalist | 34.97% |

== Special elections ==
There were special elections in 1814 and 1815 to the 13th United States Congress and 14th United States Congress.

Special elections are sorted by date then district.

=== 13th Congress ===
| District | Incumbent | | | This race | |
| District | Member | Party | First elected | Results | Candidates (Note: Only candidates with at least 1% of the vote listed.) |
|---|---|---|---|---|---|
| Kentucky 2 | Henry Clay | Democratic- Republican | 1810 | Incumbent resigned January 19, 1814 to travel to Europe for the War of 1812 negotiations. New member elected February 28, 1814 and seated March 29, 1814. Democratic-Republican hold. Winner was not a candidate for re-election; see below. | ▌ ✓ Joseph H. Hawkins (Democratic-Republican) 47.1%; ▌George Trotter Jr. (Federalist) 42.7%; ▌William B. Blackburn (Democratic-Republican) 10.2% |
| Massachusetts 4 "Middlesex district" | William M. Richardson | Democratic- Republican | 1811 (special) | Incumbent resigned April 18, 1814. New member elected May 23, 1814 and seated September 22, 1814. Democratic-Republican hold. Winner was re-elected; see below. | ▌ ✓ Samuel Dana (Democratic-Republican) 57.6%; ▌Asahel Stearns (Federalist) 42.4% |
| Virginia 11 | John Dawson | Democratic- Republican | 1797 | Incumbent died March 31, 1814. New member elected June 1814 and seated January 11, 1815. Democratic-Republican hold. Winner was later re-elected; see below. | ▌ ✓ Philip P. Barbour (Democratic-Republican); Uncontested |
| Massachusetts 12 "Berkshire district" | Daniel Dewey | Federalist | 1812 | Incumbent resigned February 24, 1814, to become associate judge of the Massachusetts SJC. New member elected August 4, 1814 and seated September 26, 1814. Federalist hold. Winner was later re-elected; see below. | ▌ ✓ John W. Hulbert (Federalist) 51.4%; ▌William P. Walker (Democratic-Republican) 48.6% |
| New Hampshire at-large | Samuel Smith | Federalist | 1812 | Incumbent resigned May 21, 1814. (Note: Samuel Smith's resignation is not mentioned in the Biographical Directory of the United States Congress.); In the August 29, 1814 special election, no candidate received the required majority to be elected. The seat was left vacant for the remainder of the Congress. Federalist loss. | ▌Parker Noyes (Federalist) 49.1%; ▌David L. Morrill (Democratic-Republican) 48.2%; ▌Charles H. Atherton (Federalist) 2.6%; Others 0.9% |
| Tennessee 5 | Felix Grundy | Democratic- Republican | 1811 | Incumbent resigned in 1814. New member elected September 15–16, 1814 and seated October 15, 1814. Democratic-Republican hold. Winner was re-elected; see below. | ▌ ✓ Newton Cannon (Democratic-Republican) 50.2%; ▌Thomas Claiborne (Democratic-Republican) 25.9%; ▌William W. Cooke (Unknown) 15.6%; ▌John Reid (Unknown) 8.4% |
| New Jersey 3 "Southern district" | Jacob Hufty | Federalist | 1808 | Incumbent died May 20, 1814. New member elected October 10–11, 1814 and seated November 2, 1814. Democratic-Republican gain. By the time of the special election the legislature had reinstated at-large elections. This was the second of three cases when the special election was held on a different basis than the general election. Winner was not a candidate for election to the next term; see below. | ▌ ✓ Thomas Bines (Democratic-Republican) 51.3%; ▌William B. Ewing (Federalist) 48.7% |
| Missouri Territory at-large | Edward Hempstead | Democratic- Republican | 1812 (new seat) | Incumbent served until September 17, 1814. New delegate elected September 17, 1814 and seated November 16, 1814. Democratic-Republican hold. Winner also elected to the next term; see below. | ▌ ✓ Rufus Easton (Democratic-Republican) 36.7%; ▌Alexander MacNair (Democratic-Republican) 33.1%; ▌Samuel Hammond (Democratic-Republican) 28.8%; ▌Thomas F. Riddick (Democratic-Republican) 1.4% |
| Ohio 6 | Reasin Beall | Democratic- Republican | 1813 (special) | Incumbent resigned June 7, 1814. New member elected October 11, 1814 and seated December 22, 1814. Democratic-Republican hold. Winner also elected to the next term; see below. | ▌ ✓ David Clendenin (Democratic-Republican) 63.6%; ▌Lewis Kinney (Democratic-Republican) 17.5%; ▌John G. Young (Democratic-Republican) 12.2%; ▌Thomas G. Jones (Democratic-Republican) 6.1% |
| Pennsylvania 2 | Jonathan Roberts | Democratic- Republican | 1810 | Incumbent resigned February 24, 1814, when elected U.S. Senator. New member elected October 11, 1814 and seated November 29, 1814. Federalist gain. Winner lost election to the next term; see below. | ▌ ✓ Samuel Henderson (Federalist) 50.4%; ▌John Hahn (Democratic-Republican) 49.6% |
| Pennsylvania 3 | James Whitehill | Democratic- Republican | 1812 | Incumbent resigned September 1, 1814, to engage in mercantile pursuits. New member elected October 12, 1814 and seated December 12, 1814. Federalist gain. Winner elected to the next term; see below. | ▌ ✓ Amos Slaymaker (Federalist) 55.9%; ▌John Whiteside (Democratic-Republican) 44.1% |

=== 14th Congress ===
| District | Incumbent | | | This race | |
| District | Member | Party | First elected | Results | Candidates |
|---|---|---|---|---|---|
| Massachusetts 3 "Essex North district" | Daniel A. White | Federalist | 1814 | Member-elect declined the seat to become Probate Judge in Essex County. New member elected July 17, 1815 and seated December 4, 1815. Federalist hold. | ▌ ✓ Jeremiah Nelson (Federalist) (Note: Numbers of votes missing or incomplete in source.) |
| New York 6 | Jonathan Fisk | Democratic- Republican | 1808; 1810 (retired); 1812 | Incumbent resigned in March 1815 when appointed U.S. Attorney for the Southern District of New York. New member elected in April 1815 and seated December 4, 1815. Democratic-Republican hold. | ▌ ✓ James W. Wilkin (Democratic-Republican); [data missing] |
| New York 12 | Benjamin Pond | Democratic- Republican | 1810 | Incumbent died October 14, 1814. New member elected in April 1815 and seated December 7, 1815. Democratic-Republican hold. | ▌ ✓ Asa Adgate (Democratic-Republican); [data missing] |
| Virginia 15 | Matthew Clay | Democratic- Republican | 1797; 1812 (lost); 1815 | Incumbent died May 27, 1815. New member elected in October 1815 and seated December 5, 1815. Democratic-Republican hold. | ▌ ✓ John Kerr (Democratic-Republican); [data missing] |
| Pennsylvania 1 | Jonathan Williams | Democratic- Republican | 1814 | Incumbent died May 16, 1815. New member elected October 10, 1815 and seated December 6, 1815. Federalist gain. | ▌ ✓ John Sergeant (Federalist); [data missing] |
| Pennsylvania 3 | Amos Ellmaker | Democratic- Republican | 1814 (special) | Incumbent resigned July 3, 1815 to become President Judge of the 12th Judicial District. New member elected October 10, 1815 and seated December 4, 1815. Democratic-Republican hold. | ▌ ✓ James M. Wallace (Democratic-Republican); [data missing] |
| Pennsylvania 9 | David Bard | Democratic- Republican | 1794; 1798 (lost); 1802 | Incumbent died March 12, 1815. New member elected October 10, 1815 and seated December 11, 1815. Democratic-Republican hold. | ▌ ✓ Thomas Burnside (Democratic-Republican); [data missing] |
| Kentucky 2 | Henry Clay | Democratic- Republican | 1810; 1814 (resigned); 1814 | Seat declared vacant in 1815 by the governor after Henry Clay was appointed minister plenipotentiary to Great Britain. Incumbent re-elected October 30, 1815 to fill his own vacancy and seated December 4, 1815. Democratic-Republican hold. | ▌ ✓ Henry Clay (Democratic-Republican); Uncontested |
| Tennessee 2 | John Sevier | Democratic- Republican | 1790 (N.C.); 1790 (retired); 1811 | Incumbent died September 24, 1815. New member elected December 7–8, 1815 and seated January 8, 1816. Democratic-Republican hold. | ▌ ✓ William G. Blount (Democratic-Republican); [data missing] |

== Connecticut ==
Connecticut held its election September 19, 1814.

| District | Incumbent | | | This race | |
| District | Member | Party | First elected | Results | Candidates |
|---|---|---|---|---|---|
| Connecticut at-large 7 seats on a general ticket | Epaphroditus Champion | Federalist | 1806 | Incumbent re-elected. | ▌ ✓ Epaphroditus Champion (Federalist); ▌ ✓ John Davenport (Federalist); ▌ ✓ Lyman Law (Federalist); ▌ ✓ Jonathan O. Moseley (Federalist); ▌ ✓ Timothy Pitkin (Federalist); ▌ ✓ Lewis B. Sturges (Federalist); ▌ ✓ Benjamin Tallmadge (Federalist); ▌Sylvanus Backus (Federalist); ▌Asa Bacon (Federalist); ▌Charles Dennison (Federalist); ▌Sylvester Gilbert (Federalist); ▌James Gould (Federalist); ▌Uriel Holmes (Federalist); ▌Ebenezer Huntington (Federalist); ▌Samuel B. Sherwood (Federalist); ▌Nathan Smith (Federalist); ▌Nathaniel Terry (Federalist); ▌Thomas Scott Williams (Federalist) |
| Connecticut at-large 7 seats on a general ticket | John Davenport | Federalist | 1798 | Incumbent re-elected. | |
| Connecticut at-large 7 seats on a general ticket | Lyman Law | Federalist | 1810 | Incumbent re-elected. | |
| Connecticut at-large 7 seats on a general ticket | Jonathan O. Moseley | Federalist | 1804 | Incumbent re-elected. | |
| Connecticut at-large 7 seats on a general ticket | Benjamin Tallmadge | Federalist | 1801 (special) | Incumbent re-elected. | |
| Connecticut at-large 7 seats on a general ticket | Timothy Pitkin | Federalist | 1805 (special) | Incumbent re-elected. | |
| Connecticut at-large 7 seats on a general ticket | Lewis B. Sturges | Federalist | 1805 (special) | Incumbent re-elected. | |

== Delaware ==
Delaware held its election October 4, 1814.

| District | Incumbent | | | This race | |
| District | Member | Party | First elected | Results | Candidates |
|---|---|---|---|---|---|
| Delaware at-large 2 seats on a general ticket | Henry M. Ridgely | Federalist | 1810 | Incumbent retired. Federalist hold. | ▌ ✓ Thomas Clayton (Federalist) 30.4%; ▌ ✓ Thomas Cooper (Federalist) 30.4%; ▌Willard Hall (Democratic-Republican) 19.6%; ▌George Read Jr. (Democratic-Republican) 19.6% |
| Delaware at-large 2 seats on a general ticket | Thomas Cooper | Federalist | 1812 | Incumbent re-elected. | ▌ ✓ Thomas Clayton (Federalist) 30.4%; ▌ ✓ Thomas Cooper (Federalist) 30.4%; ▌Willard Hall (Democratic-Republican) 19.6%; ▌George Read Jr. (Democratic-Republican) 19.6% |

== Georgia ==
Georgia held its election October 3, 1814.

| District | Incumbent | | | This race | |
| District | Member | Party | First elected | Results | Candidates |
|---|---|---|---|---|---|
| Georgia at-large 6 seats on a general ticket | John Forsyth | Democratic-Republican | 1812 | Incumbent re-elected. | ▌ ✓ John Forsyth (Democratic-Republican) 17.0%; ▌ ✓ Alfred Cuthbert (Democratic-Republican) 15.7%; ▌ ✓ Wilson Lumpkin (Democratic-Republican) 13.7%; ▌ ✓ Richard Henry Wilde (Democratic-Republican) 12.4%; ▌ ✓ Bolling Hall (Democratic-Republican) 11.4%; ▌ ✓ Thomas Telfair (Democratic-Republican) 10.6%; ▌William Barnett (Democratic-Republican) 9.8%; ▌Joel Abbot (Democratic-Republican) 8.5%; ▌Hiram Storrs (Unknown) 0.9% |
| Georgia at-large 6 seats on a general ticket | Alfred Cuthbert | Democratic-Republican | 1813 (special) | Incumbent re-elected. | ▌ ✓ John Forsyth (Democratic-Republican) 17.0%; ▌ ✓ Alfred Cuthbert (Democratic-Republican) 15.7%; ▌ ✓ Wilson Lumpkin (Democratic-Republican) 13.7%; ▌ ✓ Richard Henry Wilde (Democratic-Republican) 12.4%; ▌ ✓ Bolling Hall (Democratic-Republican) 11.4%; ▌ ✓ Thomas Telfair (Democratic-Republican) 10.6%; ▌William Barnett (Democratic-Republican) 9.8%; ▌Joel Abbot (Democratic-Republican) 8.5%; ▌Hiram Storrs (Unknown) 0.9% |
| Georgia at-large 6 seats on a general ticket | George M. Troup | Democratic-Republican | 1806 | Incumbent retired. Democratic-Republican hold. | ▌ ✓ John Forsyth (Democratic-Republican) 17.0%; ▌ ✓ Alfred Cuthbert (Democratic-Republican) 15.7%; ▌ ✓ Wilson Lumpkin (Democratic-Republican) 13.7%; ▌ ✓ Richard Henry Wilde (Democratic-Republican) 12.4%; ▌ ✓ Bolling Hall (Democratic-Republican) 11.4%; ▌ ✓ Thomas Telfair (Democratic-Republican) 10.6%; ▌William Barnett (Democratic-Republican) 9.8%; ▌Joel Abbot (Democratic-Republican) 8.5%; ▌Hiram Storrs (Unknown) 0.9% |
| Georgia at-large 6 seats on a general ticket | William Barnett | Democratic-Republican | 1812 (special) | Incumbent lost re-election. Democratic-Republican hold. | ▌ ✓ John Forsyth (Democratic-Republican) 17.0%; ▌ ✓ Alfred Cuthbert (Democratic-Republican) 15.7%; ▌ ✓ Wilson Lumpkin (Democratic-Republican) 13.7%; ▌ ✓ Richard Henry Wilde (Democratic-Republican) 12.4%; ▌ ✓ Bolling Hall (Democratic-Republican) 11.4%; ▌ ✓ Thomas Telfair (Democratic-Republican) 10.6%; ▌William Barnett (Democratic-Republican) 9.8%; ▌Joel Abbot (Democratic-Republican) 8.5%; ▌Hiram Storrs (Unknown) 0.9% |
| Georgia at-large 6 seats on a general ticket | Bolling Hall | Democratic-Republican | 1810 | Incumbent re-elected. | ▌ ✓ John Forsyth (Democratic-Republican) 17.0%; ▌ ✓ Alfred Cuthbert (Democratic-Republican) 15.7%; ▌ ✓ Wilson Lumpkin (Democratic-Republican) 13.7%; ▌ ✓ Richard Henry Wilde (Democratic-Republican) 12.4%; ▌ ✓ Bolling Hall (Democratic-Republican) 11.4%; ▌ ✓ Thomas Telfair (Democratic-Republican) 10.6%; ▌William Barnett (Democratic-Republican) 9.8%; ▌Joel Abbot (Democratic-Republican) 8.5%; ▌Hiram Storrs (Unknown) 0.9% |
| Georgia at-large 6 seats on a general ticket | Thomas Telfair | Democratic-Republican | 1812 | Incumbent re-elected. | ▌ ✓ John Forsyth (Democratic-Republican) 17.0%; ▌ ✓ Alfred Cuthbert (Democratic-Republican) 15.7%; ▌ ✓ Wilson Lumpkin (Democratic-Republican) 13.7%; ▌ ✓ Richard Henry Wilde (Democratic-Republican) 12.4%; ▌ ✓ Bolling Hall (Democratic-Republican) 11.4%; ▌ ✓ Thomas Telfair (Democratic-Republican) 10.6%; ▌William Barnett (Democratic-Republican) 9.8%; ▌Joel Abbot (Democratic-Republican) 8.5%; ▌Hiram Storrs (Unknown) 0.9% |

== Illinois Territory ==
See Non-voting delegates, below.

== Indiana Territory ==
See Non-voting delegates, below.

== Kentucky ==
Kentucky held its elections August 3, 1814.

| District | Incumbent | | | This race | |
| District | Member | Party | First elected | Results | Candidates |
|---|---|---|---|---|---|
| Kentucky 1 | James Clark | Democratic-Republican | 1812 | Incumbent re-elected. | ▌ ✓ James Clark (Democratic-Republican) 100% |
| Kentucky 2 | Joseph H. Hawkins | Democratic-Republican | 1814 (special) | Incumbent retired. Democratic-Republican hold. (Note: Henry Clay was elected to the 2nd district, which he had represented in the 12th and 13th Congresses until he resigned to accept a position as diplomatic envoy to Great Britain. He was still out of the country at the time of the general election. Kentucky's governor, unsure of the implications of a situation in which Clay held the office of United States Representative and diplomatic envoy simultaneously, declared his seat vacant. A subsequent special election was held in 1815, which Clay won without opposition, See above. Although the district was unrepresented from the March 4, 1815 (the start of the 14th Congress) until October 30, 1815, the 14th Congress did not meet until December 4, 1815 so there was no effective vacancy.) | ▌ ✓ Henry Clay (Democratic-Republican) |
| Kentucky 3 | Richard M. Johnson | Democratic-Republican | 1806 | Incumbent re-elected. | ▌ ✓ Richard M. Johnson (Democratic-Republican) 100% |
| Kentucky 4 | Joseph Desha | Democratic-Republican | 1806 | Incumbent re-elected. | ▌ ✓ Joseph Desha (Democratic-Republican) 100% |
| Kentucky 5 | Samuel Hopkins | Democratic-Republican | 1812 | Incumbent retired. Democratic-Republican hold. | ▌ ✓ Alney McLean (Democratic-Republican) 54.1%; ▌Anthony New (Democratic-Republican) 27.1%; ▌Rezin Davidge (Unknown) 18.8% |
| Kentucky 6 | Solomon P. Sharp | Democratic-Republican | 1812 | Incumbent re-elected. | ▌ ✓ Solomon P. Sharp (Democratic-Republican) 100% |
| Kentucky 7 | Samuel McKee | Democratic-Republican | 1808 | Incumbent re-elected. | ▌ ✓ Samuel McKee (Democratic-Republican) 61.3%; ▌Samuel South (Unknown) 38.7% |
| Kentucky 8 | Stephen Ormsby | Democratic-Republican | 1810 | Incumbent re-elected. | ▌ ✓ Stephen Ormsby (Democratic-Republican); ▌James Moore (Unknown) |
| Kentucky 9 | Thomas Montgomery | Democratic-Republican | 1812 | Incumbent lost re-election. Democratic-Republican hold. | ▌ ✓ Micah Taul (Democratic-Republican); ▌Thomas Montgomery (Democratic-Republican) |
| Kentucky 10 | William P. Duval | Democratic-Republican | 1812 | Incumbent retired. Democratic-Republican hold. | ▌ ✓ Benjamin Hardin (Democratic-Republican); ▌Matthew Walton (Democratic-Republican) |

== Louisiana ==
Louisiana held its election July 4–6, 1814.

| District | Incumbent | | | This race | |
| District | Member | Party | First elected | Results | Candidates |
|---|---|---|---|---|---|
| Louisiana at-large | Thomas B. Robertson | Democratic- Republican | 1812 | Incumbent re-elected. | ▌ ✓ Thomas B. Robertson (Democratic-Republican) 90.6%; ▌John B. Prevost (Federalist) 8.2% |

== Maryland ==
Maryland held its elections October 3, 1814.

| District | Incumbent | | | This race | |
| District | Member | Party | First elected | Results | Candidates |
|---|---|---|---|---|---|
| Maryland 1 | Philip Stuart | Federalist | 1810 | Incumbent re-elected. | ▌ ✓ Philip Stuart (Federalist) 99.8% |
| Maryland 2 | Joseph Kent | Democratic- Republican | 1810 | Incumbent lost re-election. Federalist gain. | ▌ ✓ John C. Herbert (Federalist) 57.3%; ▌Joseph Kent (Democratic-Republican) 42.6% |
| Maryland 3 | Alexander C. Hanson | Federalist | 1812 | Incumbent re-elected. | ▌ ✓ Alexander C. Hanson (Federalist) 99.4% |
| Maryland 4 | Samuel Ringgold | Democratic- Republican | 1810 | Incumbent lost re-election. Federalist gain. | ▌ ✓ George Baer Jr. (Federalist) 51.4%; ▌Samuel Ringgold (Democratic-Republican) 48.5% |
| Maryland 5 Plural district with 2 seats | Nicholas R. Moore | Democratic- Republican | 1803; 1810 (lost); 1812 | Incumbent re-elected. | ▌ ✓ Nicholas R. Moore (Democratic-Republican) 38.3%; ▌ ✓ William Pinkney (Democratic-Republican) 38.0%; ▌John E. Howard (Federalist) 22.9% |
| Maryland 5 Plural district with 2 seats | Alexander McKim | Democratic- Republican | 1808 | Incumbent retired. Democratic-Republican hold. | ▌ ✓ Nicholas R. Moore (Democratic-Republican) 38.3%; ▌ ✓ William Pinkney (Democratic-Republican) 38.0%; ▌John E. Howard (Federalist) 22.9% |
| Maryland 6 | Stevenson Archer | Democratic- Republican | 1811 (special) | Incumbent re-elected. | ▌ ✓ Stevenson Archer (Democratic-Republican) 51.8%; ▌Abraham Jarrett (Federalist) 48.1% |
| Maryland 7 | Robert Wright | Democratic- Republican | 1810 (special) | Incumbent re-elected. | ▌ ✓ Robert Wright (Democratic-Republican) 52.5%; ▌Samuel W. Thomas (Federalist) 47.5% |
| Maryland 8 | Charles Goldsborough | Federalist | 1804 | Incumbent re-elected. | ▌ ✓ Charles Goldsborough (Federalist) 96.2%; ▌Thomas E. Waggaman (Democratic-Republican) 3.8% |

== Massachusetts ==
Massachusetts held its elections November 7, 1814. State law required a majority vote for election which was not met in two districts, leading to a second election January 6, 1815.

District numbers differed between source used and elsewhere on Wikipedia; district numbers used elsewhere on Wikipedia used here.

| District | Incumbent | | | This race | |
| District | Member | Party | First elected | Results | Candidates |
|---|---|---|---|---|---|
| Massachusetts 1 "Suffolk district" | Artemas Ward Jr. | Federalist | 1812 | Incumbent re-elected. | ▌ ✓ Artemas Ward Jr. (Federalist) 96.9%; ▌Benjamin Austin (Democratic-Republican) 3.1% |
| Massachusetts 2 "Essex South district" | Timothy Pickering; Redistricted from the 3rd district | Federalist | 1812 | Incumbent re-elected. | ▌ ✓ Timothy Pickering (Federalist) 89.2%; ▌Daniel Kilham (Democratic-Republican) 10.8% |
| Massachusetts 3 "Essex North district" | William Reed; Redistricted from the 2nd district | Federalist | 1810 | Incumbent retired. Federalist hold. Successor declined the seat before Congress convened, causing a special election. | ▌ ✓ Daniel A. White (Federalist) 89.6%; ▌Thomas Kitteridge (Democratic-Republican) 10.2% |
| Massachusetts 4 "Middlesex district" | Samuel Dana | Democratic- Republican | 1814 (special) | Incumbent lost re-election. Federalist gain. | ▌ ✓ Asahel Stearns (Federalist) 53.5%; ▌Samuel Dana (Democratic-Republican) 46.5% |
| Massachusetts 5 "Hampshire South district" | William Ely | Federalist | 1804 | Incumbent retired. Federalist hold. | ▌ ✓ Elijah H. Mills (Federalist) 89.4%; ▌Enos Foot (Democratic-Republican) 10.6% |
| Massachusetts 6 "Hampshire North district" | Samuel Taggart | Federalist | 1803 | Incumbent re-elected. | ▌ ✓ Samuel Taggart (Federalist) 61.7%; ▌Samuel C. Allen (Federalist) 30.2%; ▌Solomon Snead (Democratic-Republican) 8.2% |
| Massachusetts 7 "Berkshire district" | John W. Hulbert; Redistricted from the 12th district | Federalist | 1812 | Incumbent re-elected. | ▌ ✓ John W. Hulbert (Federalist) 55.6%; ▌William P. Walker (Democratic-Republican) 44.4% |
| Massachusetts 8 "Plymouth district" | William Baylies; Redistricted from the 7th district | Federalist | 1812 | Incumbent re-elected. | ▌ ✓ William Baylies (Federalist) 65.3%; ▌Seth Sprague (Democratic-Republican) 33.5%; ▌Joseph Rice (Democratic-Republican) 1.2% |
| Massachusetts 9 "Barnstable district" | John Reed Jr. Redistricted from the 8th district | Federalist | 1812 | Incumbent re-elected. | ▌ ✓ John Reed Jr. (Federalist) 78.4%; ▌Thomas Hazard Jr. (Democratic-Republican) 19.5%; ▌Joseph Dimmick (Democratic-Republican) 2.1% |
| Massachusetts 10 "Bristol district" | Laban Wheaton; Redistricted from the 9th district | Federalist | 1808 | Incumbent re-elected. | ▌ ✓ Laban Wheaton (Federalist) 65.2%; ▌Marcus Morton (Democratic-Republican) 34.8% |
| Massachusetts 11 "Worcester South district" | Elijah Brigham; Redistricted from the 10th district | Federalist | 1810 | Incumbent re-elected. | ▌ ✓ Elijah Brigham (Federalist) 66.2%; ▌John Spurr (Democratic-Republican) 33.8% |
| Massachusetts 12 "Worcester North district" | Abijah Bigelow; Redistricted from the 11th district | Federalist | 1810 | Incumbent retired. Federalist hold. | ▌ ✓ Solomon Strong (Federalist) 74.8%; ▌Edmund Cushing (Democratic-Republican) 25.2% |
| Massachusetts 13 "Norfolk district" | Nathaniel Ruggles | Federalist | 1812 | Incumbent re-elected. | ▌ ✓ Nathaniel Ruggles (Federalist) 57.4%; ▌Thomas Boylston Adams (Democratic-Republican) 42.6% |
| Massachusetts 14 "1st Eastern district" District of Maine | Cyrus King | Federalist | 1812 | Incumbent re-elected. | ▌ ✓ Cyrus King (Federalist) 53.1%; ▌John Holmes (Democratic-Republican) 46.9% |
| Massachusetts 15 "2nd Eastern district" District of Maine | George Bradbury | Federalist | 1812 | Incumbent re-elected. | ▌ ✓ George Bradbury (Federalist) 64.7%; ▌Ezekiel Whitman (Democratic-Republican) |
| Massachusetts 16 "3rd Eastern district" District of Maine | Abiel Wood; Redistricted from the 17th district | Democratic- Republican | 1812 | Incumbent lost re-election. Federalist gain. | ▌ ✓ Benjamin Brown (Federalist) 61.7%; ▌Abiel Wood (Democratic-Republican) 38.3% |
| Massachusetts 17 "4th Eastern district" District of Maine | John Wilson; Redistricted from the 18th district | Federalist | 1812 | Incumbent lost re-election. Democratic-Republican gain. | First ballot (November 7, 1814): ▌John Wilson (Federalist) 49.3%; ▌James Carr (Federalist) 48.3%; Others 2.4%; Second ballot (January 6, 1815): ▌ ✓ James Carr (Federalist) 57.0%; ▌John Wilson (Federalist) 43.0% |
| Massachusetts 18 "5th Eastern district" District of Maine | James Parker; Redistricted from the 19th district | Democratic- Republican | 1813 | Incumbent lost re-election. Federalist gain. | ▌ ✓ Thomas Rice (Federalist) 56.4%; ▌James Parker (Democratic-Republican) 43.6% |
| Massachusetts 19 "6th Eastern district" District of Maine | Samuel Davis; Redistricted from the 16th district | Federalist | 1812 | Incumbent lost re-election. Democratic-Republican gain. | First ballot (November 7, 1814): ▌Samuel S. Conner (Democratic-Republican) 49.3%; ▌Timothy Boutelle (Federalist) 48.8%; ▌William Reed (Democratic-Republican) 1.5%; Others 0.4%; Second ballot (January 6, 1815): ▌ ✓ Samuel S. Conner (Democratic-Republican) 52.4%; ▌Timothy Boutelle (Federalist) 47.6% |
| Massachusetts 20 "7th Eastern district" District of Maine | Levi Hubbard | Democratic- Republican | 1812 | Incumbent retired. Democratic-Republican hold. | ▌ ✓ Albion Parris (Democratic-Republican) 56.6%; ▌Samuel A. Bradley (Federalist) 43.4% |

== Mississippi Territory ==
See Non-voting delegates, below.

== Missouri Territory ==
See Non-voting delegates, below.

== New Hampshire ==
New Hampshire held its election August 29, 1814.

| District | Incumbent | | | This race | |
| District | Member | Party | First elected | Results | Candidates |
|---|---|---|---|---|---|
| New Hampshire at-large 6 seats on a general ticket | William Hale | Federalist | 1808; 1810 (lost); 1812 | Incumbent re-elected. | ▌ ✓ William Hale (Federalist) 8.7%; ▌ ✓ Daniel Webster (Federalist) 8.7%; ▌ ✓ Roger Vose (Federalist) 8.7%; ▌ ✓ Jeduthun Wilcox (Federalist) 8.7%; ▌ ✓ Bradbury Cilley (Federalist) 8.7%; ▌ ✓ Charles Humphrey Atherton (Federalist) 8.7%; ▌John Fabyan Parrott (Democratic-Republican) 8.0%; ▌David Morrill (Democratic-Republican) 8.0%; ▌Stephen P. Webster (Democratic-Republican) 8.0%; ▌Nathaniel Upham (Democratic-Republican) 8.0%; ▌Elisha Huntley (Democratic-Republican) 8.0%; ▌Josiah Butler (Democratic-Republican) 7.9% |
| New Hampshire at-large 6 seats on a general ticket | Daniel Webster | Federalist | 1812 | Incumbent re-elected. | |
| New Hampshire at-large 6 seats on a general ticket | Roger Vose | Federalist | 1812 | Incumbent re-elected. | |
| New Hampshire at-large 6 seats on a general ticket | Jeduthun Wilcox | Federalist | 1812 | Incumbent re-elected. | |
| New Hampshire at-large 6 seats on a general ticket | Bradbury Cilley | Federalist | 1812 | Incumbent re-elected. | |
| New Hampshire at-large 6 seats on a general ticket | Samuel Smith | Federalist | 1812 | Incumbent resigned May 21, 1814. Federalist hold. | |

== New Jersey ==
New Jersey held its election October 10–11, 1814. The state returned to an at-large basis for electing its representatives, abolishing the short-lived districts of the previous election.

| District | Incumbent | | | This race | |
| District | Member | Party | First elected | Results | Candidates |
|---|---|---|---|---|---|
| New Jersey at-large 6 seats on a general ticket | Jacob Hufty | Federalist | 1808 | Incumbent died May 20, 1814. Democratic-Republican gain. Successor was not a candidate that same day to finish the term; see above. | ▌ ✓ Henry Southard (Democratic-Republican) 8.6%; ▌ ✓ Lewis Condict (Democratic-Republican) 8.6%; ▌ ✓ Ephraim Bateman (Democratic-Republican) 8.6%; ▌ ✓ Ezra Baker (Democratic-Republican) 8.6%; ▌ ✓ Benjamin Bennet (Democratic-Republican) 8.6%; ▌ ✓ Thomas Ward (Democratic-Republican) 8.6%; ▌John Frelinghuysen (Federalist) 8.1%; ▌John N. Cumming (Federalist) 8.1%; ▌James Parker (Federalist) 8.1%; ▌James Giles (Federalist) 8.0%; ▌Samuel W. Harrison (Federalist) 8.0%; ▌Jacob S. Thompson (Federalist) 8.0% |
| New Jersey at-large 6 seats on a general ticket | Lewis Condict; Redistricted from the 1st district | Democratic-Republican | 1810 | Incumbent re-elected. | |
| New Jersey at-large 6 seats on a general ticket | James Schureman; Redistricted from the 2nd district | Federalist | 1789; 1798 (lost); 1813 | Incumbent retired. Democratic-Republican gain. | |
| New Jersey at-large 6 seats on a general ticket | Richard Stockton; Redistricted from the 2nd district | Federalist | 1813 | Incumbent retired. Democratic-Republican gain. | |
| New Jersey at-large 6 seats on a general ticket | William Coxe Jr. Redistricted from the 3rd district | Federalist | 1813 | Incumbent retired. Democratic-Republican gain. | |
| New Jersey at-large 6 seats on a general ticket | Thomas Ward; Redistricted from the 1st district | Democratic-Republican | 1813 | Incumbent re-elected. | |

== New York ==
New York held its elections April 26–28, 1814.

| District | Incumbent | | | This race | |
| District | Member | Party | First elected | Results | Candidates |
|---|---|---|---|---|---|
| New York 1 Plural district with 2 seats | Ebenezer Sage | Democratic-Republican | 1810 | Incumbent retired. Democratic-Republican hold. | ▌ ✓ George Townsend (Democratic-Republican) 26.8%; ▌ ✓ Henry Crocheron (Democratic-Republican) 26.8%; ▌William Townsend (Federalist) 22.7%; ▌Cornelius Bedell (Federalist) 22.6% |
| New York 1 Plural district with 2 seats | John Lefferts | Democratic-Republican | 1812 | Incumbent retired. Democratic-Republican hold. | ▌ ✓ George Townsend (Democratic-Republican) 26.8%; ▌ ✓ Henry Crocheron (Democratic-Republican) 26.8%; ▌William Townsend (Federalist) 22.7%; ▌Cornelius Bedell (Federalist) 22.6% |
| New York 2 Plural district with 2 seats | William Irving | Democratic-Republican | 1813 (special) | Incumbent re-elected. | ▌ ✓ William Irving (Democratic-Republican) 26.3%; ▌ ✓ Peter H. Wendover (Democratic-Republican) 26.0%; ▌John Anthon (Federalist) 23.7%; ▌Jacob Lorillard (Federalist) 23.7% |
| New York 2 Plural district with 2 seats | Jotham Post Jr. | Federalist | 1812 | Incumbent retired. Democratic-Republican gain. | ▌ ✓ William Irving (Democratic-Republican) 26.3%; ▌ ✓ Peter H. Wendover (Democratic-Republican) 26.0%; ▌John Anthon (Federalist) 23.7%; ▌Jacob Lorillard (Federalist) 23.7% |
| New York 3 | Peter Denoyelles | Democratic-Republican | 1812 | Incumbent retired. Democratic-Republican hold. | ▌ ✓ Jonathan Ward (Democratic-Republican) 45.6%; ▌Richard Valentine Morris (Federalist) 43.8%; ▌Philip Van Cortlandt (Democratic-Republican) 10.6% |
| New York 4 | Thomas J. Oakley | Federalist | 1812 | Incumbent retired. Democratic-Republican gain. | ▌ ✓ Abraham H. Schenck (Democratic-Republican) 54.0%; ▌Abraham Bockee (Federalist) 46.0% |
| New York 5 | Thomas P. Grosvenor | Federalist | 1812 | Incumbent re-elected. | ▌ ✓ Thomas P. Grosvenor (Federalist) 61.7%; ▌Edward P. Livingston (Democratic-Republican) 38.3% |
| New York 6 | Jonathan Fisk | Democratic-Republican | 1812 | Incumbent re-elected. Incumbent resigned at the beginning of the term, triggering a special election. | ▌ ✓ Jonathan Fisk (Democratic-Republican) 78.0%; ▌Jonas Storey (Federalist) 22.0% |
| New York 7 | Abraham J. Hasbrouck | Democratic-Republican | 1812 | Incumbent retired. Democratic-Republican hold. | ▌ ✓ Samuel Betts (Democratic-Republican) 56.6%; ▌Elnathan Sears (Federalist) 43.7% |
| New York 8 | Samuel Sherwood | Federalist | 1812 | Incumbent retired. Federalist hold. Loser successfully challenged the election. | ▌ ✓ John Adams (Federalist) 47.1%; ▌Erastus Root (Democratic-Republican) 39.2%; "Erastus Rott" 13.8% |
| New York 9 | John Lovett | Federalist | 1812 | Incumbent re-elected. | ▌ ✓ John Lovett (Federalist) 63.9%; ▌Robert L. Tillotson (Democratic-Republican) 36.1% |
| New York 10 | Hosea Moffitt | Federalist | 1812 | Incumbent re-elected. | ▌ ✓ Hosea Moffitt (Federalist) 57.9%; ▌Josiah Masters (Democratic-Republican) 42.1% |
| New York 11 | John W. Taylor | Democratic-Republican | 1812 | Incumbent re-elected. | ▌ ✓ John W. Taylor (Democratic-Republican) 57.8%; ▌Elisha Powell (Federalist) 42.2% |
| New York 12 Plural district with 2 seats | Zebulon R. Shipherd | Federalist | 1812 | Incumbent lost re-election. Democratic-Republican gain. | ▌ ✓ John Savage (Democratic-Republican) 25.8%; ▌ ✓ Benjamin Pond (Democratic-Republican) 25.6%; ▌Elisha I. Winter (Federalist) 24.4%; ▌Zebulon R. Shipherd (Federalist) 24.3% |
| New York 12 Plural district with 2 seats | Elisha I. Winter | Federalist | 1812 | Incumbent lost re-election. Democratic-Republican gain. Successor died before the next term began, triggering a special election. | ▌ ✓ John Savage (Democratic-Republican) 25.8%; ▌ ✓ Benjamin Pond (Democratic-Republican) 25.6%; ▌Elisha I. Winter (Federalist) 24.4%; ▌Zebulon R. Shipherd (Federalist) 24.3% |
| New York 13 | Alexander Boyd | Federalist | 1812 | Incumbent retired. Democratic-Republican gain. | ▌ ✓ John B. Yates (Democratic-Republican) 57.8%; ▌Lawrence Vrooman (Federalist) 42.2% |
| New York 14 | Jacob Markell | Federalist | 1812 | Incumbent retired. Federalist hold. | ▌ ✓ Daniel Cady (Federalist) 51.9%; ▌John McCarthy (Democratic-Republican) 48.1% |
| New York 15 Plural district with 2 seats | Isaac Williams Jr. | Democratic-Republican | 1813 (special) | Incumbent retired. Democratic-Republican hold. | ▌ ✓ Jabez D. Hammond (Democratic-Republican) 28.0%; ▌ ✓ James Birdsall (Democratic-Republican) 27.8%; ▌Robert Campbell (Federalist) 22.2%; ▌Tracy Robinson (Federalist) 22.0% |
| New York 15 Plural district with 2 seats | Joel Thompson | Federalist | 1812 | Incumbent retired. Democratic-Republican gain. | ▌ ✓ Jabez D. Hammond (Democratic-Republican) 28.0%; ▌ ✓ James Birdsall (Democratic-Republican) 27.8%; ▌Robert Campbell (Federalist) 22.2%; ▌Tracy Robinson (Federalist) 22.0% |
| New York 16 | Morris S. Miller | Federalist | 1812 | Incumbent retired. Federalist hold. | ▌ ✓ Thomas R. Gold (Federalist) 56.6%; ▌Nathan Williams (Democratic-Republican) 43.4% |
| New York 17 | William S. Smith | Federalist | 1812 | Incumbent re-elected. Loser successfully challenged the election. | ▌ ✓ William S. Smith (Federalist) 47.5%; ▌Westel Willoughby Jr. (Democratic-Republican) 46.7%; "Westel Willoughby" 5.8% |
| New York 18 | Moss Kent | Federalist | 1812 | Incumbent re-elected. | ▌ ✓ Moss Kent (Federalist) 53.9%; ▌Samuel Whittlesey (Democratic-Republican) 46.1% |
| New York 19 | James Geddes | Federalist | 1812 | Incumbent lost re-election. Democratic-Republican gain. | ▌ ✓ Victory Birdseye (Democratic-Republican) 58.9%; ▌James Geddes (Federalist) 41.1% |
| New York 20 Plural district with 2 seats | Daniel Avery | Democratic-Republican | 1810 | Incumbent retired. Democratic-Republican hold. | ▌ ✓ Enos T. Throop (Democratic-Republican) 36.8%; ▌ ✓ Oliver C. Comstock (Democratic-Republican) 36.5%; ▌Emanuel Coryell (Federalist) 13.4%; ▌Seth Phelps (Federalist) 13.3% |
| New York 20 Plural district with 2 seats | Oliver C. Comstock | Democratic-Republican | 1812 | Incumbent re-elected. | ▌ ✓ Enos T. Throop (Democratic-Republican) 36.8%; ▌ ✓ Oliver C. Comstock (Democratic-Republican) 36.5%; ▌Emanuel Coryell (Federalist) 13.4%; ▌Seth Phelps (Federalist) 13.3% |
| New York 21 Plural district with 2 seats | Samuel M. Hopkins | Federalist | 1812 | Incumbent retired. Democratic-Republican gain. | ▌ ✓ Micah Brooks (Democratic-Republican) 27.6%; ▌ ✓ Peter B. Porter (Democratic-Republican) 27.1%; ▌Daniel W. Lewis (Federalist) 22.7%; ▌Richard Smith (Federalist) 22.6% |
| New York 21 Plural district with 2 seats | Nathaniel W. Howell | Federalist | 1812 | Incumbent retired. Democratic-Republican gain. | ▌ ✓ Micah Brooks (Democratic-Republican) 27.6%; ▌ ✓ Peter B. Porter (Democratic-Republican) 27.1%; ▌Daniel W. Lewis (Federalist) 22.7%; ▌Richard Smith (Federalist) 22.6% |

== North Carolina ==
North Carolina held its elections August 10, 1815.

| District | Incumbent | | | This race | |
| District | Member | Party | First elected | Results | Candidates |
|---|---|---|---|---|---|
| North Carolina 1 | William H. Murfree | Democratic-Republican | 1813 | Incumbent re-elected. | ▌ ✓ William H. Murfree (Democratic-Republican) 57.0%; ▌Lemuel Sawyer (Democratic-Republican) 37.0%; ▌William S. Hinton (Democratic-Republican) 5.4% |
| North Carolina 2 | Willis Alston | Democratic-Republican | 1798 | Incumbent retired. Democratic-Republican hold. | ▌ ✓ Joseph H. Bryan (Democratic-Republican) 52.2%; ▌Thomas Burgess (Federalist) 47.8% |
| North Carolina 3 | William Kennedy | Democratic-Republican | 1803; 1810 (lost); 1813 (special) | Incumbent retired. Democratic-Republican hold. | ▌ ✓ James W. Clark (Democratic-Republican) 53.3%; ▌James B. Haughton (Federalist) 46.7% |
| North Carolina 4 | William Gaston | Federalist | 1813 | Incumbent re-elected. | ▌ ✓ William Gaston (Federalist) |
| North Carolina 5 | William R. King | Democratic-Republican | 1810 | Incumbent re-elected. | ▌ ✓ William R. King (Democratic-Republican) |
| North Carolina 6 | Nathaniel Macon | Democratic-Republican | 1791 | Incumbent re-elected. | ▌ ✓ Nathaniel Macon (Democratic-Republican) 71.6%; ▌William Person (Federalist) 28.4% |
| North Carolina 7 | John Culpepper | Federalist | 1806; 1808 (contested); 1808 (special); 1813 | Incumbent re-elected. | ▌ ✓ John Culpepper (Federalist) 86.6%; ▌Richard Powell (Unknown) 3.6%; ▌Benjamin Robinson (Unknown) 3.0%; ▌John Winslow (Unknown) 1.0% |
| North Carolina 8 | Richard Stanford | Democratic-Republican | 1796 | Incumbent re-elected. | ▌ ✓ Richard Stanford (Democratic-Republican) 52.3%; ▌Roger Tillman (Democratic-Republican) 47.3% |
| North Carolina 9 | Bartlett Yancey | Democratic-Republican | 1813 | Incumbent re-elected. | ▌ ✓ Bartlett Yancey (Democratic-Republican) 60.0%; ▌John Caldwell (Federalist) 25.9%; ▌Alexander Sneed (Unknown) 14.1% |
| North Carolina 10 | Joseph Pearson | Federalist | 1808 | Incumbent lost re-election. Democratic-Republican gain. | ▌ ✓ William C. Love (Democratic-Republican) 53.1%; ▌Joseph Pearson (Federalist) 46.9% |
| North Carolina 11 | Peter Forney | Democratic-Republican | 1813 | Incumbent retired. Democratic-Republican hold. | ▌ ✓ Daniel M. Forney (Democratic-Republican) 53.0%; ▌Joseph Graham (Federalist) 47.0% |
| North Carolina 12 | Israel Pickens | Democratic-Republican | 1810 | Incumbent re-elected. | ▌ ✓ Israel Pickens (Democratic-Republican) 51.8%; ▌Felix Walker (Democratic-Republican) 48.2% |
| North Carolina 13 | Meshack Franklin | Democratic-Republican | 1806 | Incumbent lost re-election. Democratic-Republican hold. | ▌ ✓ Lewis Williams (Democratic-Republican) 57.2%; ▌Meshack Franklin (Democratic-Republican) 42.8% |

== Ohio ==
Ohio held its elections October 11, 1814.

| District | Incumbent | | | This race | |
| District | Member | Party | First elected | Results | Candidates |
|---|---|---|---|---|---|
| Ohio 1 | John McLean | Democratic- Republican | 1812 | Incumbent re-elected. | ▌ ✓ John McLean (Democratic-Republican) 100% |
| Ohio 2 | John Alexander | Democratic- Republican | 1812 | Incumbent re-elected. | ▌ ✓ John Alexander (Democratic-Republican) 50.6%; ▌Thomas Morris (Democratic-Republican) 41.6%; ▌John Wilson Campbell (Democratic-Republican) 7.8% |
| Ohio 3 | William Creighton Jr. | Democratic- Republican | 1813 (special) | Incumbent re-elected. | ▌ ✓ William Creighton Jr. (Democratic-Republican) 83.1%; ▌Levin Belt (Federalist) 16.9% |
| Ohio 4 | James Caldwell | Democratic- Republican | 1812 | Incumbent re-elected. | ▌ ✓ James Caldwell (Democratic-Republican) 61.2%; ▌Bezaleel Wells (Federalist) 38.3% |
| Ohio 5 | James Kilbourne | Democratic- Republican | 1812 | Incumbent re-elected. | ▌ ✓ James Kilbourne (Democratic-Republican) 45.4%; ▌Samuel MacCulloch (Democratic-Republican) 24.3%; ▌Philemon Beecher (Federalist) 21.2%; ▌Robert E. Slaughter (Democratic-Republican) 4.6%; ▌Robert Cloud (Democratic-Republican) 2.2%; ▌Hiram M. Curry (Democratic-Republican) 2.2% |
| Ohio 6 | Reasin Beall | Democratic- Republican | 1813 (special) | Incumbent resigned June 7, 1814. Democratic-Republican hold. Winner also elected to finish the current term. | ▌ ✓ David Clendenin (Democratic-Republican) 55.7%; ▌Lewis Kinney (Democratic-Republican) 24.7%; ▌John G. Young (Democratic-Republican) 15.2%; ▌Thomas G. Jones (Democratic-Republican) 4.4% |

== Pennsylvania ==
Pennsylvania held its elections October 11, 1814.

| District | Incumbent | | | This race | |
| District | Member | Party | First elected | Results | Candidates |
|---|---|---|---|---|---|
| Pennsylvania 1 Plural district with 4 seats | Adam Seybert | Democratic-Republican | 1809 (special) | Incumbent lost re-election. Federalist gain. | ▌ ✓ Jonathan Williams (Federalist) 13.6%; ▌ ✓ Joseph Hopkinson (Federalist) 13.6%; ▌ ✓ William Milnor (Federalist) 13.2%; ▌ ✓ Thomas Smith (Federalist) 13.2%; ▌Adam Seybert (Democratic-Republican) 11.8%; ▌William Anderson (Democratic-Republican) 11.8%; ▌Charles J. Ingersoll (Democratic-Republican) 11.4%; ▌John Conard (Democratic-Republican) 11.3% |
| Pennsylvania 1 Plural district with 4 seats | William Anderson | Democratic-Republican | 1808 | Incumbent lost re-election. Federalist gain. | ▌ ✓ Jonathan Williams (Federalist) 13.6%; ▌ ✓ Joseph Hopkinson (Federalist) 13.6%; ▌ ✓ William Milnor (Federalist) 13.2%; ▌ ✓ Thomas Smith (Federalist) 13.2%; ▌Adam Seybert (Democratic-Republican) 11.8%; ▌William Anderson (Democratic-Republican) 11.8%; ▌Charles J. Ingersoll (Democratic-Republican) 11.4%; ▌John Conard (Democratic-Republican) 11.3% |
| Pennsylvania 1 Plural district with 4 seats | Charles J. Ingersoll | Democratic-Republican | 1812 | Incumbent lost re-election. Federalist gain. | ▌ ✓ Jonathan Williams (Federalist) 13.6%; ▌ ✓ Joseph Hopkinson (Federalist) 13.6%; ▌ ✓ William Milnor (Federalist) 13.2%; ▌ ✓ Thomas Smith (Federalist) 13.2%; ▌Adam Seybert (Democratic-Republican) 11.8%; ▌William Anderson (Democratic-Republican) 11.8%; ▌Charles J. Ingersoll (Democratic-Republican) 11.4%; ▌John Conard (Democratic-Republican) 11.3% |
| Pennsylvania 1 Plural district with 4 seats | John Conard | Democratic-Republican | 1812 | Incumbent lost re-election. Federalist gain. | ▌ ✓ Jonathan Williams (Federalist) 13.6%; ▌ ✓ Joseph Hopkinson (Federalist) 13.6%; ▌ ✓ William Milnor (Federalist) 13.2%; ▌ ✓ Thomas Smith (Federalist) 13.2%; ▌Adam Seybert (Democratic-Republican) 11.8%; ▌William Anderson (Democratic-Republican) 11.8%; ▌Charles J. Ingersoll (Democratic-Republican) 11.4%; ▌John Conard (Democratic-Republican) 11.3% |
| Pennsylvania 2 Plural district with 2 seats | Roger Davis | Democratic-Republican | 1810 | Incumbent retired. Democratic-Republican hold. | ▌ ✓ William Darlington (Democratic-Republican) 25.1%; ▌ ✓ John Hahn (Democratic-Republican) 25.0%; ▌Isaac Wayne (Federalist) 25.0%; ▌Samuel Henderson} (Federalist) 24.9% (Note: Won special election to fill vacancy in 13th Congress.) |
| Pennsylvania 2 Plural district with 2 seats | Jonathan Roberts | Democratic-Republican | 1810 | Incumbent resigned February 24, 1814, when elected U.S. Senator. Democratic-Republican hold. Successor was not elected to finish the current term. | ▌ ✓ William Darlington (Democratic-Republican) 25.1%; ▌ ✓ John Hahn (Democratic-Republican) 25.0%; ▌Isaac Wayne (Federalist) 25.0%; ▌Samuel Henderson} (Federalist) 24.9% |
| Pennsylvania 3 Plural district with 2 seats | James Whitehill | Democratic-Republican | 1812 | Incumbent resigned September 1, 1814, to engage in mercantile pursuits. Democratic-Republican hold. Successor had already been elected to finish the current term. | ▌ ✓ Amos Ellmaker (Democratic-Republican) 28.9%; ▌ ✓ John Whiteside (Democratic-Republican) 28.4%; ▌Amos Slaymaker (Federalist) 22.0%; ▌Samuel Rex (Federalist) 20.7% |
| Pennsylvania 3 Plural district with 2 seats | Edward Crouch | Democratic-Republican | 1813 (special) | Incumbent retired. Democratic-Republican hold. | ▌ ✓ Amos Ellmaker (Democratic-Republican) 28.9%; ▌ ✓ John Whiteside (Democratic-Republican) 28.4%; ▌Amos Slaymaker (Federalist) 22.0%; ▌Samuel Rex (Federalist) 20.7% |
| Pennsylvania 4 | Hugh Glasgow | Democratic-Republican | 1812 | Incumbent re-elected. | ▌ ✓ Hugh Glasgow (Democratic-Republican) 100% |
| Pennsylvania 5 Plural district with 2 seats | William Crawford | Democratic-Republican | 1808 | Incumbent re-elected. | ▌ ✓ William Maclay (Democratic-Republican) 27.6%; ▌ ✓ William Crawford (Democratic-Republican) 25.7%; ▌Edward Crawford (Federalist) 23.9%; ▌Alexander Cobean (Federalist) 19.7% |
| Pennsylvania 5 Plural district with 2 seats | John Rea | Democratic-Republican | 1813 (special) | Incumbent retired. Democratic-Republican hold. | ▌ ✓ William Maclay (Democratic-Republican) 27.6%; ▌ ✓ William Crawford (Democratic-Republican) 25.7%; ▌Edward Crawford (Federalist) 23.9%; ▌Alexander Cobean (Federalist) 19.7% |
| Pennsylvania 6 Plural district with 2 seats | Samuel D. Ingham | Democratic-Republican | 1812 | Incumbent re-elected. | ▌ ✓ Samuel D. Ingham (Democratic-Republican) 34.1%; ▌ ✓ John Ross (Democratic-Republican) 30.0%; ▌William Rodman (Federalist) 15.9%; ▌James Hollingshead (Federalist) 12.5%; ▌James Ralston (Democratic-Republican) 4.3%; ▌Samuel Sitgreaves 3.1% (Federalist) |
| Pennsylvania 6 Plural district with 2 seats | Robert Brown | Democratic-Republican | 1798 (special) | Incumbent retired. Democratic-Republican hold. | ▌ ✓ Samuel D. Ingham (Democratic-Republican) 34.1%; ▌ ✓ John Ross (Democratic-Republican) 30.0%; ▌William Rodman (Federalist) 15.9%; ▌James Hollingshead (Federalist) 12.5%; ▌James Ralston (Democratic-Republican) 4.3%; ▌Samuel Sitgreaves 3.1% (Federalist) |
| Pennsylvania 7 | Daniel Udree | Democratic-Republican | 1813 (special) | Incumbent lost re-election. Democratic-Republican hold. | ▌ ✓ Joseph Hiester (Democratic-Republican) 60.7%; ▌Daniel Udree (Unknown) 39.3% |
| Pennsylvania 8 | William Piper | Democratic-Republican | 1810 | Incumbent re-elected. | ▌ ✓ William Piper (Democratic-Republican) 62.4%; ▌John Anderson (Federalist) 37.6% |
| Pennsylvania 9 | David Bard | Democratic-Republican | 1802 | Incumbent re-elected. | ▌ ✓ David Bard (Democratic-Republican) 78.0%; ▌John Blair (Federalist) 22.0% |
| Pennsylvania 10 Plural district with 2 seats | Isaac Smith | Democratic-Republican | 1812 | Incumbent lost re-election. Democratic-Republican hold. | ▌ ✓ William Wilson (Democratic-Republican) 28.9%; ▌ ✓ Jared Irwin (Democratic-Republican) 25.8%; ▌David Scott (Democratic-Republican) 25.6%; ▌John Boyd (Federalist) 18.0%; ▌Isaac Smith (Democratic-Republican) 1.7% |
| Pennsylvania 10 Plural district with 2 seats | Jared Irwin | Democratic-Republican | 1812 | Incumbent re-elected. | ▌ ✓ William Wilson (Democratic-Republican) 28.9%; ▌ ✓ Jared Irwin (Democratic-Republican) 25.8%; ▌David Scott (Democratic-Republican) 25.6%; ▌John Boyd (Federalist) 18.0%; ▌Isaac Smith (Democratic-Republican) 1.7% |
| Pennsylvania 11 | William Findley | Democratic-Republican | 1802 | Incumbent re-elected. | ▌ ✓ William Findley (Democratic-Republican) 55.3%; ▌James Brady (Federalist) 44.7% |
| Pennsylvania 12 | Aaron Lyle | Democratic-Republican | 1808 | Incumbent re-elected. | ▌ ✓ Aaron Lyle (Democratic-Republican) 61.3%; ▌Obadiah Jennings (Federalist) 34.2%; ▌Thomas L. Birch (Democratic-Republican) 4.4% |
| Pennsylvania 13 | Isaac Griffin | Democratic-Republican | 1813 (special) | Incumbent re-elected. | ▌ ✓ Isaac Griffin (Democratic-Republican) 100% |
| Pennsylvania 14 | Adamson Tannehill | Democratic-Republican | 1812 | Incumbent lost re-election. Federalist gain. | ▌ ✓ John Woods (Federalist) 50.5%; ▌Adamson Tannehill (Democratic-Republican) 49.5% |
| Pennsylvania 15 | Thomas Wilson | Democratic-Republican | 1813 (special) | Incumbent re-elected. | ▌ ✓ Thomas Wilson (Democratic-Republican) 78.1%; ▌Epaphroditus Cossitt (Federalist) 21.9% |

== Rhode Island ==
Rhode Island held its election August 30, 1814.

| District | Incumbent | | | This race | |
| District | Member | Party | First elected | Results | Candidates |
|---|---|---|---|---|---|
| Rhode Island at-large 2 seats on a general ticket | Richard Jackson Jr. | Federalist | 1808 | Incumbent retired. Federalist hold. | ▌ ✓ John L. Boss Jr. (Federalist) 28.3%; ▌ ✓ James B. Mason (Federalist) 27.5%; ▌Nehemiah R. Knight (Democratic-Republican) 22.1%; ▌John DeWolf Jr. (Democratic-Republican) 22.1% |
| Rhode Island at-large 2 seats on a general ticket | Elisha R. Potter | Federalist | 1808 | Incumbent retired. Federalist hold. | ▌ ✓ John L. Boss Jr. (Federalist) 28.3%; ▌ ✓ James B. Mason (Federalist) 27.5%; ▌Nehemiah R. Knight (Democratic-Republican) 22.1%; ▌John DeWolf Jr. (Democratic-Republican) 22.1% |

== South Carolina ==
South Carolina held its elections October 10–11, 1814.

| District | Incumbent | | | This race | |
| District | Member | Party | First elected | Results | Candidates |
|---|---|---|---|---|---|
| South Carolina 1 | Langdon Cheves | Democratic-Republican | 1810 | Incumbent retired. Democratic-Republican hold. | ▌ ✓ Henry Middleton (Democratic-Republican) 62.8%; ▌Thomas Rhett Smith (Federalist) 37.2% |
| South Carolina 2 | William Lowndes | Democratic-Republican | 1810 | Incumbent re-elected. | ▌ ✓ William Lowndes (Democratic-Republican) 100% |
| South Carolina 3 | Theodore Gourdin | Democratic-Republican | 1812 | Incumbent lost re-election. Federalist gain. | ▌ ✓ Benjamin Huger (Federalist) 51.6%; ▌Theodore Gourdin (Democratic-Republican) 48.4% |
| South Carolina 4 | John J. Chappell | Democratic-Republican | 1812 | Incumbent re-elected. | ▌ ✓ John J. Chappell (Democratic-Republican) |
| South Carolina 5 | David R. Evans | Democratic-Republican | 1812 | Incumbent retired. Democratic-Republican hold. | ▌ ✓ William Woodward (Democratic-Republican) |
| South Carolina 6 | John C. Calhoun | Democratic-Republican | 1810 | Incumbent re-elected. | ▌ ✓ John C. Calhoun (Democratic-Republican); ▌Benjamin C. Yancey (Democratic-Republican) |
| South Carolina 7 | Elias Earle | Democratic-Republican | 1805 (special); 1806 (lost); 1810 | Incumbent lost re-election. Democratic-Republican hold. | ▌ ✓ John Taylor (Democratic-Republican) 75.4%; ▌Elias Earle (Democratic-Republican) 24.1% |
| South Carolina 8 | Samuel Farrow | Democratic-Republican | 1812 | Incumbent retired. (Note: The source indicates uncertainty as to whether Farrow ran in 1814.); Democratic-Republican hold. | ▌ ✓ Thomas Moore (Democratic-Republican); ▌Bowen (Note: Source did not provide full name.) (Federalist); ▌Samuel Farrow (Democratic-Republican) |
| South Carolina 9 | John Kershaw | Democratic-Republican | 1812 | Incumbent lost re-election. Democratic-Republican hold. | ▌ ✓ William Mayrant (Democratic-Republican) 66.1%; ▌John Kershaw (Democratic-Republican) 33.9% |

== Tennessee ==
Tennessee held its elections August 3–4, 1815.

| District | Incumbent | | | This race | |
| District | Member | Party | First elected | Results | Candidates |
|---|---|---|---|---|---|
| Tennessee 1 | John Rhea | Democratic- Republican | 1803 | Incumbent lost re-election. Democratic-Republican hold. | ▌ ✓ Samuel Powell (Democratic-Republican) 58.9%; ▌John Rhea (Democratic-Republican) 41.1% |
| Tennessee 2 | John Sevier | Democratic- Republican | 1790 (N.C.); 1790 (retired); 1811 | Incumbent re-elected. | ▌ ✓ John Sevier (Democratic-Republican); Uncontested |
| Tennessee 3 | Thomas K. Harris | Democratic- Republican | 1813 | Incumbent lost re-election. Democratic-Republican hold. | ▌ ✓ Isaac Thomas (Democratic-Republican) 54.4%; ▌Thomas K. Harris (Democratic-Republican) 45.6% |
| Tennessee 4 | John H. Bowen | Democratic- Republican | 1813 | Incumbent retired. Democratic-Republican hold. | ▌ ✓ Bennett H. Henderson (Democratic-Republican) 66.1%; ▌Archibald W. Overton (Unknown) 23.4%; ▌Willis Jones (Unknown) 10.5% |
| Tennessee 5 | Newton Cannon | Democratic- Republican | 1814 (special) | Incumbent re-elected. | ▌ ✓ Newton Cannon (Democratic-Republican); Uncontested |
| Tennessee 6 | Parry W. Humphreys | Democratic- Republican | 1813 | Incumbent retired. Democratic-Republican hold. | ▌ ✓ James B. Reynolds (Democratic-Republican) 33.7%; ▌Peter R. Booker (Unknown) 31.6%; ▌George W. L. Marr (Democratic-Republican) 28.8%; ▌James Holland (Democratic-Republican) 5.8% |

== Vermont ==
Vermont held its elections September 6, 1814. Voters swung from one party to the other. The margins were close, actually, but to toss the entire six-member delegation out of office.

| District | Incumbent | | | This race | |
| District | Member | Party | First elected | Results | Candidates |
|---|---|---|---|---|---|
| Vermont at-large 6 seats on a general ticket | William C. Bradley | Democratic- Republican | 1812 | Incumbent lost re-election. Federalist gain. | ▌ ✓ Chauncey Langdon (Federalist) 8.5%; ▌ ✓ Charles Marsh (Federalist) 8.5%; ▌ ✓ Asa Lyon (Federalist) 8.5%; ▌ ✓ Daniel Chipman (Federalist) 8.5%; ▌ ✓ John Noyes (Federalist) 8.5%; ▌ ✓ Luther Jewett (Federalist) 8.5%; ▌Ezra Butler (Democratic-Republican) 8.2%; ▌Richard Skinner (Democratic-Republican) 8.2%; ▌William C. Bradley (Democratic-Republican) 8.2%; ▌James Fisk (Democratic-Republican) 8.2%; ▌William Strong (Democratic-Republican) 8.2%; ▌Charles Rich (Democratic-Republican) 8.1% |
| Vermont at-large 6 seats on a general ticket | William Strong | Democratic- Republican | 1810 | Incumbent lost re-election. Federalist gain. | ▌ ✓ Chauncey Langdon (Federalist) 8.5%; ▌ ✓ Charles Marsh (Federalist) 8.5%; ▌ ✓ Asa Lyon (Federalist) 8.5%; ▌ ✓ Daniel Chipman (Federalist) 8.5%; ▌ ✓ John Noyes (Federalist) 8.5%; ▌ ✓ Luther Jewett (Federalist) 8.5%; ▌Ezra Butler (Democratic-Republican) 8.2%; ▌Richard Skinner (Democratic-Republican) 8.2%; ▌William C. Bradley (Democratic-Republican) 8.2%; ▌James Fisk (Democratic-Republican) 8.2%; ▌William Strong (Democratic-Republican) 8.2%; ▌Charles Rich (Democratic-Republican) 8.1% |
| Vermont at-large 6 seats on a general ticket | James Fisk | Democratic- Republican | 1805; 1808 (lost); 1810 | Incumbent lost re-election. Federalist gain. | ▌ ✓ Chauncey Langdon (Federalist) 8.5%; ▌ ✓ Charles Marsh (Federalist) 8.5%; ▌ ✓ Asa Lyon (Federalist) 8.5%; ▌ ✓ Daniel Chipman (Federalist) 8.5%; ▌ ✓ John Noyes (Federalist) 8.5%; ▌ ✓ Luther Jewett (Federalist) 8.5%; ▌Ezra Butler (Democratic-Republican) 8.2%; ▌Richard Skinner (Democratic-Republican) 8.2%; ▌William C. Bradley (Democratic-Republican) 8.2%; ▌James Fisk (Democratic-Republican) 8.2%; ▌William Strong (Democratic-Republican) 8.2%; ▌Charles Rich (Democratic-Republican) 8.1% |
| Vermont at-large 6 seats on a general ticket | Charles Rich | Democratic- Republican | 1812 | Incumbent lost re-election. Federalist gain. | ▌ ✓ Chauncey Langdon (Federalist) 8.5%; ▌ ✓ Charles Marsh (Federalist) 8.5%; ▌ ✓ Asa Lyon (Federalist) 8.5%; ▌ ✓ Daniel Chipman (Federalist) 8.5%; ▌ ✓ John Noyes (Federalist) 8.5%; ▌ ✓ Luther Jewett (Federalist) 8.5%; ▌Ezra Butler (Democratic-Republican) 8.2%; ▌Richard Skinner (Democratic-Republican) 8.2%; ▌William C. Bradley (Democratic-Republican) 8.2%; ▌James Fisk (Democratic-Republican) 8.2%; ▌William Strong (Democratic-Republican) 8.2%; ▌Charles Rich (Democratic-Republican) 8.1% |
| Vermont at-large 6 seats on a general ticket | Richard Skinner | Democratic- Republican | 1812 | Incumbent lost re-election. Federalist gain. | ▌ ✓ Chauncey Langdon (Federalist) 8.5%; ▌ ✓ Charles Marsh (Federalist) 8.5%; ▌ ✓ Asa Lyon (Federalist) 8.5%; ▌ ✓ Daniel Chipman (Federalist) 8.5%; ▌ ✓ John Noyes (Federalist) 8.5%; ▌ ✓ Luther Jewett (Federalist) 8.5%; ▌Ezra Butler (Democratic-Republican) 8.2%; ▌Richard Skinner (Democratic-Republican) 8.2%; ▌William C. Bradley (Democratic-Republican) 8.2%; ▌James Fisk (Democratic-Republican) 8.2%; ▌William Strong (Democratic-Republican) 8.2%; ▌Charles Rich (Democratic-Republican) 8.1% |
| Vermont at-large 6 seats on a general ticket | Ezra Butler | Democratic- Republican | 1812 | Incumbent lost re-election. Federalist gain. | ▌ ✓ Chauncey Langdon (Federalist) 8.5%; ▌ ✓ Charles Marsh (Federalist) 8.5%; ▌ ✓ Asa Lyon (Federalist) 8.5%; ▌ ✓ Daniel Chipman (Federalist) 8.5%; ▌ ✓ John Noyes (Federalist) 8.5%; ▌ ✓ Luther Jewett (Federalist) 8.5%; ▌Ezra Butler (Democratic-Republican) 8.2%; ▌Richard Skinner (Democratic-Republican) 8.2%; ▌William C. Bradley (Democratic-Republican) 8.2%; ▌James Fisk (Democratic-Republican) 8.2%; ▌William Strong (Democratic-Republican) 8.2%; ▌Charles Rich (Democratic-Republican) 8.1% |

== Virginia ==
Virginia held its elections in April 1815.

| District | Incumbent | | | This race | |
| District | Member | Party | First elected | Results | Candidates |
|---|---|---|---|---|---|
| Virginia 1 | John G. Jackson | Democratic-Republican | 1803; 1810 (resigned); 1813 | Incumbent re-elected. | ▌ ✓ John G. Jackson (Democratic-Republican) 94.7%; Others 5.3% |
| Virginia 2 | Francis White | Federalist | 1813 | Incumbent lost re-election. Federalist hold. | ▌ ✓ Magnus Tate (Federalist) 63.4%; ▌Francis White (Democratic-Republican) 36.6% |
| Virginia 3 | John Smith | Democratic-Republican | 1801 | Incumbent retired. Democratic-Republican hold. | ▌ ✓ Henry S. Tucker (Democratic-Republican) 71.5%; ▌Griffin Taylor (Federalist) 27.6% |
| Virginia 4 | William McCoy | Democratic-Republican | 1811 | Incumbent re-elected. | ▌ ✓ William McCoy (Democratic-Republican) 51.0%; ▌Robert Porterfield (Federalist) 49.0% |
| Virginia 5 | James Breckinridge | Federalist | 1809 | Incumbent re-elected. | ▌ ✓ James Breckinridge (Federalist) 51.5%; ▌John Floyd (Democratic-Republican) 48.5% |
| Virginia 6 | Daniel Sheffey | Federalist | 1809 | Incumbent re-elected. | ▌ ✓ Daniel Sheffey (Federalist) 100% |
| Virginia 7 | Hugh Caperton | Federalist | 1813 | Incumbent retired. Democratic-Republican gain. | ▌ ✓ Ballard Smith (Democratic-Republican); ▌John Matthews (Federalist) |
| Virginia 8 | Joseph Lewis Jr. | Federalist | 1803 | Incumbent re-elected. | ▌ ✓ Joseph Lewis Jr. (Federalist) 52.0%; ▌Armistead Mason (Democratic-Republican) 48.0% |
| Virginia 9 | John Hungerford | Democratic-Republican | 1813 | Incumbent re-elected. | ▌ ✓ John Hungerford (Democratic-Republican) 56.9%; ▌William Brent (Democratic-Republican) 43.1% |
| Virginia 10 | Aylett Hawes | Democratic-Republican | 1811 | Incumbent re-elected. | ▌ ✓ Aylett Hawes (Democratic-Republican) 59.4%; ▌John Scott (Federalist) 40.6% |
| Virginia 11 | Philip P. Barbour | Democratic-Republican | 1814 (special) | Incumbent re-elected. | ▌ ✓ Philip P. Barbour (Democratic-Republican); ▌John Mercer (Democratic-Republican) |
| Virginia 12 | John Roane | Democratic-Republican | 1809 | Incumbent retired. Democratic-Republican hold. | ▌ ✓ William H. Roane (Democratic-Republican) 78.1%; ▌James M. Garnett (Federalist) 21.9% |
| Virginia 13 | Thomas M. Bayly | Federalist | 1811 | Incumbent retired. Democratic-Republican gain. | ▌ ✓ Burwell Bassett (Democratic-Republican) 52.6%; ▌John Eyre (Federalist) |
| Virginia 14 | William A. Burwell | Democratic-Republican | 1806 (special) | Incumbent re-elected. | ▌ ✓ William A. Burwell (Democratic-Republican) 100% |
| Virginia 15 | John Kerr | Democratic-Republican | 1813 | Incumbent lost re-election. Democratic-Republican hold. | ▌ ✓ Matthew Clay (Democratic-Republican) 42.5%; ▌John Kerr (Democratic-Republican) 34.1%; ▌William Rice (Federalist) 20.3%; ▌White (Federalist) 3.1% |
| Virginia 16 | John W. Eppes | Democratic-Republican | 1803; 1811 (lost); 1813 | Incumbent lost re-election. Democratic-Republican hold. | ▌ ✓ John Randolph (Democratic-Republican) 51.6%; ▌John W. Eppes (Democratic-Republican) 48.4% |
| Virginia 17 | James Pleasants | Democratic-Republican | 1811 | Incumbent re-elected. | ▌ ✓ James Pleasants (Democratic-Republican) 100% |
| Virginia 18 | Thomas Gholson Jr. | Democratic-Republican | 1808 (special) | Incumbent re-elected. | ▌ ✓ Thomas Gholson Jr. (Democratic-Republican); ▌John C. Goode (Federalist) |
| Virginia 19 | Peterson Goodwyn | Democratic-Republican | 1803 | Incumbent re-elected. | ▌ ✓ Peterson Goodwyn (Democratic-Republican) 100% |
| Virginia 20 | James Johnson | Democratic-Republican | 1813 | Incumbent re-elected. | ▌ ✓ James Johnson (Democratic-Republican) 52.2%; ▌Edwin Gray (Federalist) 47.8% |
| Virginia 21 | Thomas Newton Jr. | Democratic-Republican | 1797 | Incumbent re-elected. | ▌ ✓ Thomas Newton Jr. (Democratic-Republican) 100% |
| Virginia 22 | Hugh Nelson | Democratic-Republican | 1811 | Incumbent re-elected. | ▌ ✓ Hugh Nelson (Democratic-Republican) 100% |
| Virginia 23 | John Clopton | Democratic-Republican | 1801 | Incumbent re-elected. | ▌ ✓ John Clopton (Democratic-Republican) 100% |

== Non-voting delegates ==
Four territories sent delegates to the 14th Congress. There was no election held in Illinois Territory

| District | Incumbent | | | This race | |
| District | Delegate | Party | First elected | Results | Candidates |
|---|---|---|---|---|---|
| Illinois Territory at-large | No election held | | | | |
| Indiana Territory at-large | Jonathan Jennings | Democratic- Republican | 1809 | Incumbent re-elected. | ▌ ✓ Jonathan Jennings (Democratic-Republican); ▌Elisha Sparks (Democratic-Republican) |
| Mississippi Territory at-large | William Lattimore | Democratic- Republican | 1803; 1807 (unknown); 1813 | Incumbent re-elected. | ▌ ✓ William Lattimore (Democratic-Republican) 58.6%; ▌Cowles Mead (Democratic-Republican) 41.4% |
| Missouri Territory at-large | Edward Hempstead | Democratic- Republican | 1812 | Incumbent retired. New delegate elected. Democratic-Republican hold. | ▌ ✓ Rufus Easton (Democratic-Republican) 36.7%; ▌Alexander MacNair (Unknown) 33.1%; ▌Samuel Hammond (Democratic-Republican) 28.8%; ▌Thomas (Federalist); ▌Riddick (Unknown) 1.4% |

This was the last election for Indiana Territory, as it was admitted to the Union as a state in 1816. In Missouri Territory, Hempstead resigned and Easton also filled his seat for the remainder of the 13th Congress

== See also ==
- 1814 United States elections
  - List of United States House of Representatives elections (1789–1822)
  - 1814–15 United States Senate elections

== Bibliography ==
- Dubin, Michael J. (March 1, 1998). 1788–1997 United States Congressional Elections: The Official Results of the Elections of the 1st Through 105th Congresses. McFarland and Company. ISBN 978-0786402830.
- Martis, Kenneth C. (January 1, 1989). The Historical Atlas of Political Parties in the United States Congress, 1789–1989. Macmillan Publishing Company. ISBN 978-0029201701.
- "A New Nation Votes: American Election Returns 1787-1825". Tufts Digital Library, Tufts University. Archived from the original on January 29, 2015.
- "Party Divisions of the House of Representatives* 1789–Present". Office of the Historian, United States House of Representatives.
- "Fourteenth Congress March 4, 1815, to March 3, 1817". Office of the Historian, United States House of Representatives. Archived from the original on October 22, 2018 – via History.house.gov.
- Mapping Early American Elections project team (2019). "Mapping Early American Elections". Roy Rosenzweig Center for History and New Media, George Mason University.
