= List of elections in 1814 =

The following elections occurred in the year 1814.

== North America ==
=== United States ===
- 1814 United States elections

==== United States lieutenant gubernatorial ====
- 1814 Connecticut lieutenant gubernatorial election

==== United States gubernatorial ====
- 1814 Connecticut gubernatorial election
- 1814 Maryland gubernatorial election
- 1814 Massachusetts gubernatorial election
- 1814 New Hampshire gubernatorial election
- 1814 New Jersey gubernatorial election
- 1814 North Carolina gubernatorial election
- 1814 Ohio gubernatorial election
- 1814 Pennsylvania gubernatorial election
- 1814 Rhode Island gubernatorial election
- 1814 South Carolina gubernatorial election
- 1814 Vermont gubernatorial election
- 1814 Virginia gubernatorial election

==== United States Senate ====
- 1814 and 1815 United States Senate elections
- 1814 United States Senate election in Pennsylvania
- 1814 United States Senate special election in Pennsylvania

==== United States House of Representatives ====
- 1814 and 1815 United States House of Representatives elections
- 1814 United States House of Representatives election in Delaware
- 1814 United States House of Representatives election in Georgia
- 1814 United States House of Representatives election in Illinois Territory
- 1814 United States House of Representatives elections in Kentucky
- 1814 Kentucky's 2nd congressional district special election
- 1814 United States House of Representatives election in Louisiana
- 1814 United States House of Representatives elections in Maryland
- 1814 United States House of Representatives elections in Massachusetts
- 1814 Massachusetts's 4th congressional district special election
- 1814 Massachusetts's 12th congressional district special election
- 1814 United States House of Representatives election in Missouri Territory
- 1814 United States House of Representatives election in New Hampshire
- 1814 United States House of Representatives election in New Jersey
- 1814 New Jersey's 3rd congressional district special election
- 1814 United States House of Representatives elections in New York
- 1814 United States House of Representatives elections in North Carolina
- 1814 United States House of Representatives elections in Ohio
- 1814 Ohio's 6th congressional district special election
- 1814 United States House of Representatives elections in Pennsylvania
- 1814 Pennsylvania's 2nd congressional district special election
- 1814 Pennsylvania's 3rd congressional district special election
- 1814 United States House of Representatives elections in South Carolina
- 1814 Tennessee's 5th congressional district special election
- 1814 United States House of Representatives election in Vermont

== See also ==
- Category:1814 elections
