= 1814 United States House of Representatives elections in New York =

United States House of Representatives elections in New York, 1814
- April 26–28, 1814

All 27 New York seats to the United States House of Representatives
	Majority party	Minority party
Party	Democratic-Republican	Federalist
Last election	8	19
Seats won	21	6
Seat change	▲13	▼13

The 1814 United States House of Representatives elections in New York were held from April 26 to 28, 1814, to elect 27 U.S. Representatives to represent the State of New York in the United States House of Representatives of the 14th United States Congress.

== Background ==
27 U.S. Representatives had been elected in December 1812 to a term in the 13th United States Congress beginning on March 4, 1813. Representative-elect William Dowse died in February 1813, and John M. Bowers was declared elected in a special election, and seated. Isaac Williams, Jr. contested Bowers's election, and succeeded to the seat in January 1814. Egbert Benson resigned his seat in August 1812, and William Irving was elected to fill the vacancy. The representatives' term would end on March 3, 1815. The congressional elections were held together with the State elections in late April 1814, about ten months before the term would start on March 4, 1815, and about a year and a half before Congress actually met on December 4, 1815.

== Congressional districts ==
The districts remained the same as at the previous elections in 1812, only one new county was created: in the 12th D., Warren Co. was split from Washington Co.

- The 1st District (two seats) comprising the 1st and 2nd Ward of New York County, and Kings, Queens, Suffolk and Richmond counties.
- The 2nd District (two seats) comprising the other eight wards of New York County.
- The 3rd District comprising Westchester and Rockland counties.
- The 4th District comprising Dutchess County, except the towns of Rhinebeck and Clinton; and Putnam County.
- The 5th District comprising Columbia County; and Rhinebeck and Clinton in Dutchess County.
- The 6th District comprising Orange County.
- The 7th District comprising Ulster and Sullivan counties.
- The 8th District comprising Delaware and Greene counties.
- The 9th District comprising Albany County.
- The 10h District comprising Rensselaer County.
- The 11th District comprising Saratoga County.
- The 12th District (two seats) comprising Clinton, Essex, Franklin, Washington and Warren counties.
- The 13th District comprising Schenectady and Schoharie counties.
- The 14th District comprising Montgomery County.
- The 15th District (two seats) comprising Chenango, Broome and Otsego counties.
- The 16h District comprising Oneida County.
- The 17th District comprising Herkimer and Madison counties.
- The 18h District comprising St. Lawrence, Jefferson and Lewis counties.
- The 19th District comprising Onondaga and Cortland counties.
- The 20th District (two seats) comprising Tioga, Steuben, Cayuga and Seneca counties.
- The 21st District (two seats) comprising Ontario, Genesee, Allegany, Niagara and Chautauqua counties.

Note: There are now 62 counties in the State of New York. The counties which are not mentioned in this list had not yet been established, or sufficiently organized, the area being included in one or more of the abovementioned counties.

== Result ==
19 Democratic-Republicans and 8 Federalists were declared elected to the 14th Congress. The incumbents Irving, Grosvenor, Lovett, Moffitt, Taylor, Kent and Comstock were re-elected; the incumbents Winter, Shipherd and Geddes were defeated. Adams and Smith, both Federalists, had credentials issued but their Democratic-Republican opponents successfully contested the elections, so that New York was represented by 21 Democratic-Republicans and 6 Federalists in the 14th Congress.

1814 United States House election result
District	Democratic-Republican		Federalist		Democratic-Republican		Federalist	
1st	George Townsend	4,241	William Townsend	3,587	Peter H. Wendover	96	John Anthon	17
1st	Henry Crocheron	4,231	Cornelius Bedell	3,581	William Irving	46	Jacob Lorillard	15
2nd	William Irving	4,577	John Anthon	4,119	George Townsend	14	William Townsend	17
2nd	Peter H. Wendover	4,533	Jacob Lorillard	4,119	Henry Crocheron	7	Cornelius Bedell	16
3rd	Jonathan Ward	1,504	Richard Valentine Morris	1,446	Philip Van Cortlandt	348		
4th	Abraham H. Schenck	2,117	Abraham Bockee	1,803				
5th	Edward P. Livingston	1,909	Thomas P. Grosvenor	3,074				
6th	Jonathan Fisk	2,345	Jonas Storey	661				
7th	Samuel Betts	1,952	Elnathan Sears	1,499				
8th	Erastus Root	1,638	John Adams	1,968	Erastus Rott	576		
9th	Robert L. Tillotson	1,003	John Lovett	1,777				
10th	Josiah Masters	1,860	Hosea Moffitt	2,563				
11th	John W. Taylor	2,133	Elisha Powell	1,557				
12th	John Savage	4,170	Elisha I. Winter	3,955				
12th	Benjamin Pond	4,137	Zebulon R. Shipherd	3,926				
13th	John B. Yates	2,144	Lawrence Vrooman	1,566				
14th	John McCarthy	2,340	Daniel Cady	2,520				
15th	Jabez D. Hammond	4,820	Robert Campbell	3,812				
15th	James Birdsall	4,785	Tracy Robinson	3,785				
16th	Nathan Williams	2,159	Thomas R. Gold	2,821				
17th	Westel Willoughby, Jr.	2,466	William S. Smith	2,510	Westel Willoughby	309		
18th	Samuel Whittlesey	1,862	Moss Kent	2,177				
19th	Victory Birdseye	2,414	James Geddes	1,684				
20th	Enos T. Throop	5,055	Emanuel Coryell	1,838				
20th	Oliver C. Comstock	5,013	Seth Phelps	1,833				
21st	Micah Brooks	5,967	Daniel W. Lewis	4,913				
21st	Peter B. Porter	5,870	Richard Smith	4,893				

Note: The Anti-Federalists called themselves "Republicans." However, at the same time, the Federalists called them "Democrats" which was meant to be pejorative. After some time both terms got more and more confused, and sometimes used together as "Democratic Republicans" which later historians have adopted (with a hyphen) to describe the party from the beginning, to avoid confusion with both the later established and still existing Democratic and Republican parties.

== Aftermath, special elections and contested election ==
Benjamin Pond, elected in the 12th District, died on October 6, 1814, before the congressional term began. A special election to fill the vacancy was held at the time of the annual State election in April 1815, and was won by Asa Adgate, of the same party.

Jonathan Fisk, elected in the 6th District, accepted in March 1815 an appointment as United States Attorney for the Southern District of New York, and resigned his seat. A special election to fill the vacancy was held at the time of the annual State election in April 1815, and was won by James W. Wilkin, of the same party.

1815 United States House special election result
District	Democratic-Republican		Federalist	
6th	James W. Wilkin	1,429	Samuel S. Seward	981
12th	Asa Adgate	4,247	Elisha I. Winter	4,051

The House of Representatives of the 14th United States Congress met for the first time at the Old Brick Capitol in Washington, D.C., on December 4, 1815, and Betts, Birdsall, Brooks, Comstock, Crocheron, Gold, Hammond, Lovett, Moffitt, Savage, Schenck, Taylor, Throop, Townsend, Ward and Wilkin took their seats on this day. Adgate took his seat on December 7; Porter on December 11; Cady on December 12; Kent on December 13; Grosvenor and Yates on December 18; Birdseye on December 20; Wendover on December 21; and Irving on January 22, 1816.

Westel Willoughby, Jr. contested the election of William S. Smith in the 17th District. The Committee on Elections found that the election inspectors in the towns of German Flatts and Litchfield had returned 299 votes for "Westel Willoughby" although all these votes had in fact been given for "Westel Willoughby, Jr." The Secretary of State of New York, receiving the abovementioned result, issued credentials for Smith. On February 23, 1815, Willoughby, Jr., gave notice to Smith, informing that he would claim the seat, and appointed a time and place to take testimony. Smith did not appear in Congress to claim the seat, and on December 13, 1815, the House declared Willoughby, Jr., entitled to the seat instead of Smith, and Willoughby, Jr., took his seat.

Erastus Root contested the election of John Adams in the 8th District. The Committee on Elections found that a deputy county clerk of Greene Co. had mistakenly written Root's name as "Rott" when transcribing the returns from the towns of Catskill, New Baltimore, Coxsackie, Durham and Greenville. The Secretary of State of New York, receiving the abovementioned result, issued credentials for Adams, but Adams did not appear to claim the seat. A total of 576 votes had been given for Root in these towns and, added to the correctly transcribed returns, gave him a majority of 246 in the district. On December 26, 1815, the House declared Root entitled to the seat instead of Adams, and Root took his seat.

Peter B. Porter had been appointed a Commissioner under the Treaty of Ghent. Article I, Section 6, of the United States Constitution says that "...no Person holding any Office under the United States, shall be a Member of either House during his Continuance in Office." Porter was determined to keep his seat, but after some debate, resigned on January 23, 1816. A special election to fill the vacancy was held at the time of the annual State election in April 1816, and was won by Archibald S. Clarke, of the same party. Clarke took his seat on December 2, 1816.

After being defeated for re-election, Enos T. Throop resigned his seat on June 4, 1816. A special election to fill the vacancy was held in September 1816, and was won by Daniel Avery, of the same party. Avery took his seat on December 3, 1816.

1816 United States House special election result
District	Democratic-Republican		Democratic-Republican	
20th	Daniel Avery	1,915	Charles Kellogg	1,641

== Sources ==
- The New York Civil List compiled in 1858 (see: pg. 66 for district apportionment; pg. 70 for Congressmen)
- Members of the Fourteenth United States Congress
- Election result 1st D. at project "A New Nation Votes", compiled by Phil Lampi, hosted by Tufts University Digital Library
- Election result 2nd D. at "A New Nation Votes"
- Election result 3rd D. at "A New Nation Votes"
- Election result 4th D. at "A New Nation Votes"
- Election result 5th D. at "A New Nation Votes"
- Election result 6th D. at "A New Nation Votes"
- Election result 7th D. at "A New Nation Votes"
- Election result 8th D. at "A New Nation Votes" [gives total vote of 2,214 for Root; the newspaper editor was not aware of the deputy county clerk's mistake]
- Election result 9th D. at "A New Nation Votes"
- Election result 10th D. at "A New Nation Votes"
- Election result 11th D. at "A New Nation Votes"
- Election result 12th D. at "A New Nation Votes"
- Election result 13th D. at "A New Nation Votes"
- Election result 14th D. at "A New Nation Votes"
- Election result 15th D. at "A New Nation Votes"
- Election result 16th D. at "A New Nation Votes"
- Election result 17th D. at "A New Nation Votes" [gives total vote of 2,783 for Willoughby, Jr.; the newspaper editor was not aware of the election inspectors' mistake]
- Election result 18th D. at "A New Nation Votes"
- Election result 19th D. at "A New Nation Votes"
- Election result 20th D. at "A New Nation Votes"
- Election result 21st D. at "A New Nation Votes"
- 1815 Special election result 6th D. at "A New Nation Votes"
- 1815 Special election result 12th D. at "A New Nation Votes"
- 1816 Special election result 20th D. at "A New Nation Votes"
