= 1812 United States House of Representatives elections in New York =

United States House of Representatives elections in New York, 1812
- December 15–17, 1812

All 27 New York seats to the United States House of Representatives
	Majority party	Minority party
Party	Federalist	Democratic-Republican
Last election	5	12
Seats won	19	8
Seat change	▲14	▼4
Popular vote	74,401	65,350
Percentage	53.2%	46.8%

The 1812 United States House of Representatives elections in New York were held from December 15 to 17, 1812, to elect 27 U.S. Representatives to represent the State of New York in the United States House of Representatives of the 13th United States Congress. At the same time, a vacancy was filled in the 12th United States Congress.

== Background ==
17 U.S. Representatives had been elected in April 1810 to a term in the 12th United States Congress beginning on March 4, 1811. The representatives' term would end on March 3, 1813. Although the U.S. census of 1810 showed that New York would be entitled to more seats in the House, the New York State Legislature adjourned on March 27, 1812, without re-apportioning the congressional districts. Congressional elections were held, as usual, together with the State elections from April 28 to 30, 1812, but these were subsequently declared void.

1812 annulled United States House election result
District	Democratic-Republican	Federalist	Clintonian
1			
2	Gurdon S. Mumford	Peter A. Jay	
2	Silvanus Miller	Peter Mesier	
3	Jonathan Fisk	Richard Valentine Morris	
4			
5	Abraham J. Hasbrouck	William Fraser	
6			
7	William K. Fuller	John Lovett	
8	Melancton Smith	Elisha I. Winter	
9			
10	Perley Keyes	Moss Kent	
11			
12			
13			
14	J. L. Richardson	Elijah Miller	Ebenezer Hewitt
15	Peter B. Porter	Myron Holley	Micah Brooks

On May 6, 1812, Robert Le Roy Livingston resigned his seat to fight in the War of 1812, leaving a vacancy in the 6th District.

The State Legislature reconvened on May 21, 1812, and re-apportioned the congressional district by an Act passed on June 10, 1812. The number of seats was increased to 27, and the date of the elections was set for December 15 to 17. At the same time the vacancy in the former 6th District was to be filled.

== Congressional districts ==
Due to the increase in seats, the previously eliminated 16th and 17th D. were re-established, and four more districts were created. Six districts had two members, elected districtwide on a general ticket.

- The 1st District (two seats) comprising the 1st and 2nd Ward of New York County, and Kings, Queens, Suffolk and Richmond counties.
- The 2nd District (two seats) comprising the other eight wards of New York County.
- The 3rd District comprising Westchester and Rockland counties.
- The 4th District comprising Dutchess County, except the towns of Rhinebeck and Clinton; and Putnam County.
- The 5th District comprising Columbia County; and Rhinebeck and Clinton in Dutchess County.
- The 6th District comprising Orange County.
- The 7th District comprising Ulster and Sullivan counties.
- The 8th District comprising Delaware and Greene counties.
- The 9th District comprising Albany County.
- The 10th District comprising Rensselaer County.
- The 11th District comprising Saratoga County.
- The 12th District (two seats) comprising Clinton, Essex, Franklin and Washington counties.
- The 13th District comprising Schenectady and Schoharie counties.
- The 14th District comprising Montgomery County.
- The 15th District (two seats) comprising Chenango, Broome and Otsego counties.
- The 16th District comprising Oneida County.
- The 17th District comprising Herkimer and Madison counties.
- The 18th District comprising St. Lawrence, Jefferson and Lewis counties.
- The 19th District comprising Onondaga and Cortland counties.
- The 20th District (two seats) comprising Tioga, Steuben, Cayuga and Seneca counties.
- The 21st District (two seats) comprising Ontario, Genesee, Allegany, Niagara and Chautauqua counties.

Note: There are now 62 counties in the State of New York. The counties which are not mentioned in this list had not yet been established, or sufficiently organized, the area being included in one or more of the abovementioned counties.

== Result ==
19 Federalists and 8 Democratic-Republicans were elected to the 13th Congress, and one Federalist to fill the vacancy in the 12th Congress. The incumbents Sage and Avery were re-elected; the incumbent Van Cortlandt was defeated. Grosvenor was elected to fill the vacancy, and to succeed himself in the next Congress.

1812 United States House election result
District	Federalist		Democratic-Republican		Federalist		Democratic-Republican	
1st	Peter A. Jay	3,446	John Lefferts	3,515				
1st	Benjamin B. Blydenburgh	3,437	Ebenezer Sage	3,508				
2nd	Egbert Benson	3,938	John Ferguson	3,737				
2nd	Jotham Post, Jr.	3,922	William Irving	3,732				
3rd	Richard V. Morris	1,269	Peter Denoyelles	1,404			Pierre Van Cortlandt, Jr.	569
4th	Thomas J. Oakley	1,995	Theodorus R. Van Wyck	1,489				
5th	Thomas P. Grosvenor	1,856						
6th	John Bradner	609	Jonathan Fisk	1,102	Anthony Davis	431		
7th	Abraham T. E. De Witt	1,486	Abraham J. Hasbrouck	1,631				
8th	Samuel Sherwood	2,303	John Ely	1,990				
9th	John Lovett	1,253						
10th	Hosea Moffitt	2,147						
11th	Samuel Stewart	1,974	John W. Taylor	2,209				
12th	Zebulon R. Shipherd	3,981	Melancton Smith	3,237			William Livingston	406
12th	Elisha I. Winter	3,918	Roger Skinner	3,209				
13th	Alexander Boyd	1,722	John Gebhard	1,434			Jesse Shephard	208
14th	Jacob Markell	2,490	James McIntyre	1,987				
15th	Joel Thompson	4,479	Robert Roseboom	3,946				
15th	William Dowse	4,418	Amos Patterson	3,924				
16th	Morris S. Miller	2,710	George Brayton	1,573				
17th	William S. Smith	2,606	Hubbard Smith	1,971				
18th	Moss Kent	2,194	Jacob Brown	1,389				
19th	James Geddes	1,634	John Miller	1,297				
20th	Elijah Miller	2,359	Oliver C. Comstock	4,357				
20th	Vincent Mathews	2,356	Daniel Avery	4,323				
21st	Nathaniel W. Howell	4,428	Chauncey Loomis	3,618			Micah Brooks	74
21st	Samuel M. Hopkins	4,426	Stephen Bates	3,511				
Old 6th Special	Thomas P. Grosvenor							

Note: The Anti-Federalists called themselves "Republicans." However, at the same time, the Federalists called them "Democrats" which was meant to be pejorative. After some time both terms got more and more confused, and sometimes used together as "Democratic Republicans" which later historians have adopted (with a hyphen) to describe the party from the beginning, to avoid confusion with both the later established and still existing Democratic and Republican parties.

== Aftermath, special elections and contested elections ==
Thomas P. Grosvenor took his seat in the 12th United States Congress on January 29, 1813.

William Dowse, elected in the 15th D., died on February 18, 1813, before the begin of the congressional term. A special election to fill the vacancy was held at the time of the annual State election from April 26 to 28, and John M. Bowers, of the same party, was declared elected.

1813 United States House special election result
District	Federalist		Democratic-Republican			
15th	John M. Bowers	4,287	Isaac Williams, Jr.	4,129	Isaac Williams	434

Note: One vote was given for "John M. Bowey", and 17 votes were scattered among other people. At the time, in the State of New York ballots with the name written by hand, or printed and distributed by the party machine men, were put in a box marked with the office the vote was intended for, like "Congress" or "Governor".

The House of Representatives of the 13th United States Congress met for the first time at the United States Capitol in Washington, D.C., on May 24, 1813, and Avery, Benson, Comstock, Denoyelles, Fisk, Geddes, Grosvenor, Kent, Lefferts, Lovett, Markell, Miller, Moffitt, Oakley, Post, Sage, Sherwood, Shiphard, Taylor, Thompson and Winter took their seats on this day. Boyd and Smith took their seats on May 25; Howell on May 26; Hopkins on June 4; Bowers on June 21; and Hasbrouck sometime before July 1.

Two days after Bowers had taken his seat, on June 23, Jonathan Fisk presented a petition on behalf of Isaac Williams, Jr., contesting the election of John M. Bowers to fill the vacancy caused by the death of William Dowse. Williams, Jr., claimed that the votes returned for "Isaac Williams" were intended for him, since there were only two candidates - Bowers and Williams, Jr. - and although there were two other men named Isaac Williams living in this district, neither of them was running for Congress. On July 2, the United States House Committee on Elections reported that it seemed the claim was justified, considering that in some towns apparently all votes were given for "Williams" and none for "Williams, Jr." Nevertheless, the committee were "of the opinion that further evidence was necessary, to form a correct decision" and postponed the matter "until the first Wednesday of the next session."

On July 7, 1813, a petition on behalf of Peter A. Jay and Benjamin B. Blydenburgh was presented to the House, contesting the election of Ebenezer Sage and John Lefferts in the 1st D. On July 13, the Committee on Elections postponed this case also to the next session, but no further action was taken.

Egbert Benson resigned his seat on August 2, 1813, at the end of the first session of the 13th Congress. A special election to fill the vacancy was held in the 2nd District from December 28 to 30, and was won by William Irving, of the opposing party. Irving took his seat on January 22, 1814.

1813 United States House special election result
District	Democratic-Republican		Federalist	
2nd	William Irving	3,895	Peter A. Jay	3,518

The second session of the 13th Congress began on December 6, 1813, and on December 13, Fisk asked the committee to submit its final report. On December 20, the Committee reported that in the towns of Exeter, Milford and Westford 322 votes were in fact given for "Isaac Williams, Jr.", but had been returned for "Isaac Williams" by the election inspectors "by mistake." The House declared unanimously Williams, Jr., entitled to the seat instead of Bowers. Williams, Jr., took his seat on January 24, 1814.

== Sources ==
- The New York Civil List compiled in 1858 (see: pg. 66 for district apportionment; pg. 70 for Congressmen)
- Members of the Thirteenth United States Congress
- Election result 1st D. at project "A New Nation Votes", compiled by Phil Lampi, hosted by Tufts University Digital Library
- Election result 2nd D. at "A New Nation Votes"
- Election result 3rd D. at "A New Nation Votes"
- Election result 4th D. at "A New Nation Votes"
- Election result 5th D. at "A New Nation Votes"
- Election result 6th D. at "A New Nation Votes"
- Election result 7th D. at "A New Nation Votes"
- Election result 8th D. at "A New Nation Votes"
- Election result 9th D. at "A New Nation Votes"
- Election result 10th D. at "A New Nation Votes"
- Election result 11th D. at "A New Nation Votes"
- Election result 12th D. at "A New Nation Votes"
- Election result 13th D. at "A New Nation Votes"
- Election result 14th D. at "A New Nation Votes"
- Election result 15th D. at "A New Nation Votes"
- Election result 16th D. at "A New Nation Votes"
- Election result 17th D. at "A New Nation Votes"
- Election result 18th D. at "A New Nation Votes"
- Election result 19th D. at "A New Nation Votes"
- Election result 20th D. at "A New Nation Votes"
- Election result 21st D. at "A New Nation Votes"
- 1813 Special election result 2nd D. at "A New Nation Votes"
- Voided election result Old 2nd D. at "A New Nation Votes" [gives result only for Richmond Co.]
- Voided election result Old 3rd D. at "A New Nation Votes" [gives result only for Orange Co.]
- Voided election result Old 5th D. at "A New Nation Votes" [gives result only for Greene Co.]
- Voided election result Old 7th D. at "A New Nation Votes" [gives result only for Schenectady Co.]
- Voided election result Old 10th D. at "A New Nation Votes" [gives result only for Jefferson Co.]
- Voided election result Old 14th D. at "A New Nation Votes" [gives result only for Cayuga Co.]
- Voided election result Old 15th D. at "A New Nation Votes" [gives result only for Niagara Co.]
