= 1815 New York's 12th congressional district special election =

On October 6, 1814, prior to the beginning of the Fourteenth Congress, Representative-elect Benjamin Pond (DR), who'd been elected to New York's 12th district, died. A special election to fill this vacancy was held in April, 1815.

== Election results ==
Candidate	Party	Votes	Percent
Asa Adgate	Democratic-Republican	4,247	50.8%
Elisha I. Winter	Federalist	4,051	48.5%
Others		62	0.7%

Adgate took his seat at the beginning of the 14th Congress.

== See also ==
- List of special elections to the United States House of Representatives
