= 1814 New Jersey's 3rd congressional district special election =

A special election was held in New Jersey's at-large congressional district October 10–11, 1814 to fill a vacancy left by the death of Jacob Hufty (F) on May 20, 1814.

== Election results ==
Candidate	Party	Votes	Percent
Thomas Bines	Democratic-Republican	17,357	51.3%
William Ewing	Federalist	16,501	48.7%

Bines took his seat on November 2, 1814

== See also ==
- List of special elections to the United States House of Representatives
