= 1815 Massachusetts's 3rd congressional district special election =

Although elected in the 1814–1815 United States House of Representatives elections in Massachusetts, Daniel A. White (Federalist) of the 3rd district was offered, and accepted, the position of probate judge in Essex County before taking his seat in Congress.

== Special election ==
A special election was held July 17, 1815, electing Jeremiah Nelson (Federalist) to fill the vacated seat. and he was seated with the rest of the House at the beginning of the 14th United States Congress on December 4, 1815.

== White's "lost" election ==
For unknown reasons, some records credit Nelson with White's votes as if Nelson were elected during the regular cycle without regard for White's election.
