= John Jay Shipherd =

American clergyman and educator (1802–1844)

John Jay Shipherd (March 28, 1802 – September 16, 1844) was an American clergyman who co-founded Oberlin College in Oberlin, Ohio, in 1833 with Philo Penfield Stewart. In 1844, Shipherd also founded Olivet College in Olivet, Michigan.

Both Oberlin College and Olivet College were envisioned by Shipherd to be idealistic, Christian communities based on a simple lifestyle, manual labor, and working for the betterment of the community and mankind. Under Shipherd's leadership, Oberlin College set important precedents of admitting both men and women without regard for race. Oberlin was the first co-educational college in the United States.

== Personal background ==
Shipherd was born in Granville, New York, just across the border from Vermont, on March 28, 1802. He was the son of Hon. Zebulon R. and Elizabeth B. Shipherd. His father was a graduate of Bennington Academy, a lawyer and one-time Federalist congressman, and a slaveowner, something he would later rue.

John was "carefully and religiously educated." As was typical in the early 19th century, Shipherd left home to attend a college preparatory school, first in Pawlet, Vermont, where Beriah Green may also have studied, and later for two years in Cambridge, New York. While at Pawlet, he had a religious experience and also met his sociate, Philo P. Stewart. According to an early biographer, "From this time to the end of his days his character and life were marked with profound earnestness and restless activity."

Esther Raymond Shipherd. There are no known photographs of John Shipherd.

Shipherd had prepared to enter Middlebury College in Middlebury, Vermont. Unfortunately, while spending a few days at home in February 1822, before leaving for college, he mistakenly swallowed saltpeter, thinking it was epsom salt. For the remainder of his life, he suffered from damaged eyesight and an irritation to the lining of his stomach. He attempted to resume his studies, but his eyesight prevented reading for more than a few minutes continuously without intense pain.

=== Marriage ===
In 1824, Shipherd married Esther Raymond (1797–1879) of Ballston, New York, and moved to Vergennes, Vermont, to work in a marble business that his father started on his behalf. After the death of his infant daughter and the failure of the marble business, Shipherd decided to enter the ministry, following in his older brother Fayette's footsteps. Leaving his wife with her parents, he began his theological studies under Rev. Josiah Hopkins, in New Haven, Vermont, along with a number of other young men. He managed his studies using a system of shorthand writing and hiring a fellow student to read to him.

Sometime during the 1820s, Shipherd's father became an enthusiastic follower of the great New York evangelist, Charles Grandison Finney. The younger Shipherd also came under Finney's influence and looked to him for guidance and leadership.

== Ministerial background ==
Shipherd was first called to be a pastor at the church in Shelburne, Vermont, holding that position for about a year. From 1828 to 1830, Shipherd served as General Agent of the Vermont Sabbath School Union. While headquartered in Middlebury, he edited a Sunday school paper and traveled throughout Vermont organizing Sunday schools. In 1830, he received an honorary degree from Middlebury College in recognition of his work.

About that time, the Congregational and Presbyterian churches of the East had begun an effort to extend Christian influence among the new settlers in the West. Absolom Peters' Home Missionary and Pastor's Journal, that began in Boston, Massachusetts, in 1828, was the official organ of the movement. Shipherd was persuaded that he had a call to go to the area west of the Appalachian Mountains, known then as the "Valley of the Mississippi".

In 1830, Shipherd accepted a commission from the American Home Mission Society. Around this time he met Rev. Daniel W. Lathrop, who was about to exit as pastor of the church in Elyria, Ohio due to voice problems. Shipherd was called to that church in October 1830. He stopped in Rochester, New York, on the way, to visit Finney — Finney tried to get Shipherd to stay in Rochester as his assistant, and Shipherd tried to get Finney to come to Ohio, which he did four years later. Shipherd was installed as pastor in Elyria in February 1831. During his two years there, Shipherd was intensely occupied in revivals in his own parish and in the surrounding region. His congregation was deeply divided by factional controversies, which included Shipherd's strong support for prohibition, and his health suffered.

== Educational administration ==
=== Oberlin College ===
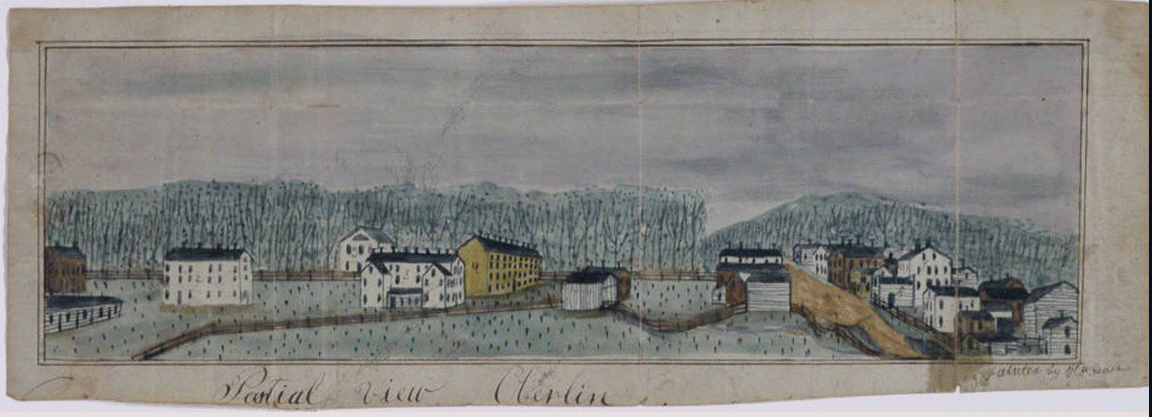
Partial View Oberlin by H. Alonzo Pease, 1838

During the summer of 1832, Philo P. Stewart, Shipherd's friend from his Pawlet Academy days and an Indian missionary, visited Rev. Shipherd in Elyria. While there, Stewart began his divinity training with Shipherd. Together, they formed a plan to establish a colony and educational institute in northern Ohio, based on idealistic Christian beliefs.

In October 1832, Shipherd resigned as pastor. According to legend, Shipherd and Stewart rode southwest from Elyria into the untamed woods along an old surveyor's cut looking for a site for their colony. Stopping to pray under an elm tree, they were moved to select this spot. This was the "Historic Elm", located on Oberlin's Tappan Square, that lived until 1965.

In October, Shipherd left his family and Steward in Elyria and traveled throughout the East for about eight months, securing a donation of the land for Oberlin, raising money, and recruiting teachers and students.

In September 1833, Shipherd, with his wife and four sons, joined the other colonists and moved into the basement of the first college building, rustic Oberlin Hall. They shared their basement apartment with another family.

The first Oberlin classes began in December 1833. Shipherd led the first church services in Oberlin Hall. From the beginning, Shipherd planned for the college to educate both women and men. Oberlin was the first co-educational college in the United States. Both Shipherd and Stewart served as Trustees, after Oberlin was incorporated by Ohio in March 1834.

Church services were an integral part of the Oberlin colony. Led by Shipherd, the Congregational Church of Christ at Oberlin, was organized in September 1834. The church immediately applied to become part of the Cleveland Presbytery. Shipherd was unanimously called to serve as the first pastor, which he did until June 1836, when he resigned due to ill health and his desire to establish other schools.

==== Oberlin faculty ====
Financial difficulties plagued the colony and collegiate institute into 1835 when the Lane Rebels left Lane Seminary in Cincinnati, Ohio and came to Oberlin to form a solid core of students and teachers. These included both Asa Mahan, first president of Oberlin (Finney had been asked first, which Theodore Weld recommended to Arthur Tappan, but declined); and John Morgan, professor and fervent abolitionist. The expansion of the faculty at Oberlin was initiated by Shipherd's solicitation of additional financial support from Arthur and Lewis Tappan. One prerequisite of the Tappan brothers was that Oberlin also accept students "without regard for race". After Shipherd's forceful persuasion, the Oberlin trustees adopted this policy.

The support of the Tappan brothers brought the evangelist Charles Grandison Finney to head the Oberlin Theological Department. The charismatic Finney became the religious leader of the community, centered on First Church. This church, modeled on the Tabernacle in New York City, was the largest auditorium west of the Appalachians for many decades.

As early as 1835, Shipherd envisioned a series of Oberlin-like schools, proceeding westward. He first tried to establish the Grand River Seminary just west of Lansing, Michigan, along with several members of the Oberlin colony.

In June 1836, Shipherd issued an announcement of the new institution, together with a plea for financial aid. Caught between President Jackson's "Specie Circular" that required payment for government lands with gold and the Panic of 1837, Shipherd's New York supporters could not pay their pledges and the effort failed.

In March 1837, Shipherd wrote to the editor of the New York Evangelist announcing the development of the Lagrange Collegiate Institute which was to arise in Lagrange County, Indiana. There is no evidence that this proceeded any further.

=== Olivet College ===
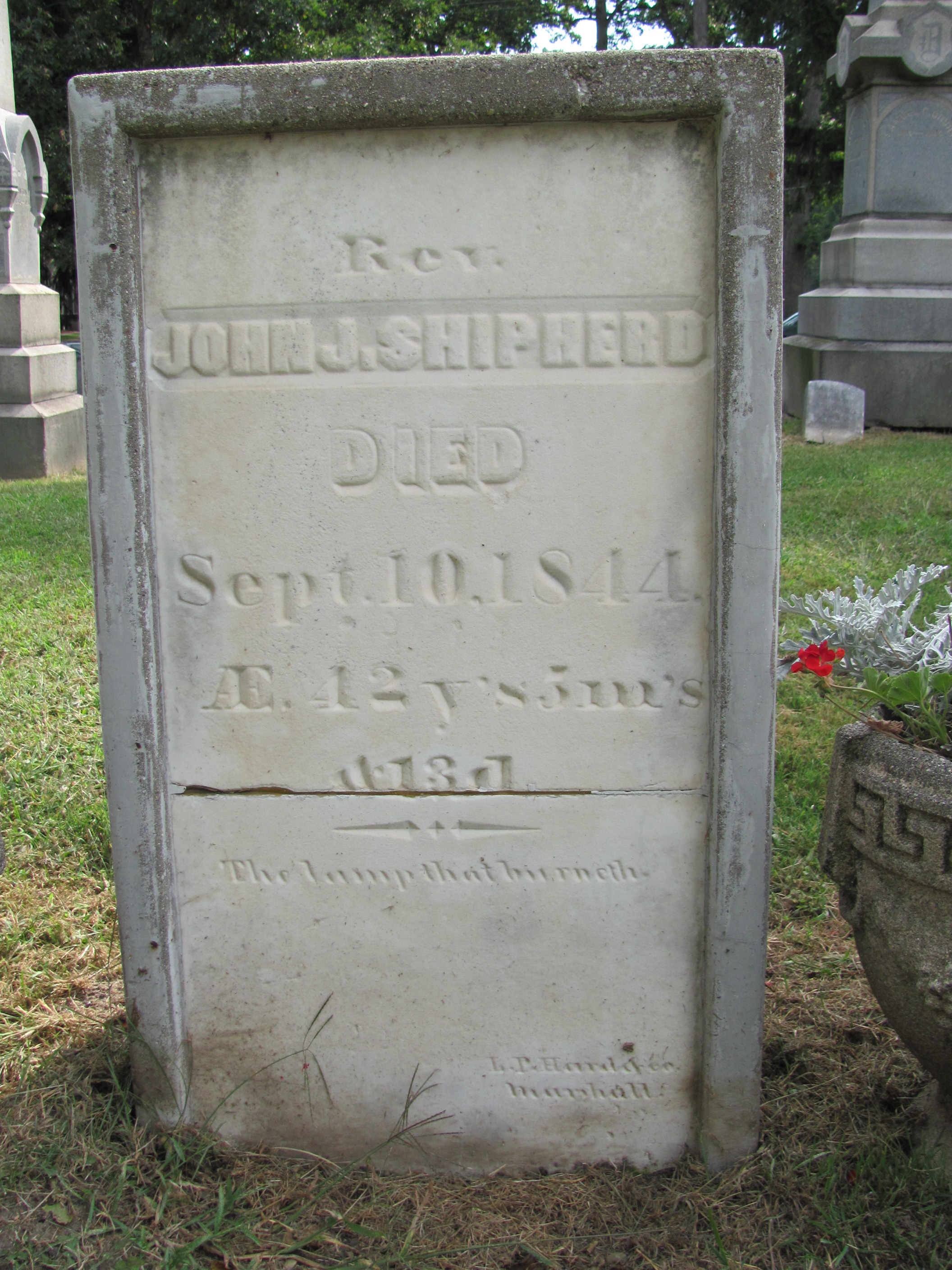
John Shipherd's grave in Olivet, Michigan

In November 1843, Shipherd went to Michigan to take care of some Oberlin business and to make a preliminary survey for a new colony and school. In southern Eaton County, Shipherd spent the night at a settler's cabin in a small clearing near the hilltop now occupied by Olivet College. The next morning, setting out again on his journey toward Charlotte, he lost his way and was startled to find himself three times drawn back to the forest-covered hilltop. Shipherd took this as a divine sign that the college should be located there.

In the early months of 1844, 39 missionaries, including Oberlin faculty, students, and alumni came to Michigan. They initially lived in abandoned log cabins and crowded in together as new cabins were built. Through the warmer months, they cleared trees, planted crops, and built both saw and grist mills. Malaria broke out and spread until most of the colonists were sick. Shipherd became sick at Olivet and died on September 16, 1844. Despite these hardships, classes began at Olivet in December 1844 and continue to this day. Shipherd is interred in the Olivet City Cemetery adjacent to the Olivet College campus.

There are two extensive biographical chapters on Shipherd. James Harris Fairchild, who knew Shipherd, gives a more anecdotal account. Fletcher relies extensively on primary material, including many of Shipherd's letters. There is also a remembrance by his wife, located in the Oberlin College archives, as well as a photograph of her, though none exists for Shipherd himself.
