= 1815 Tennessee's 2nd congressional district special election =

On September 24, 1815, John Sevier (DR), representative for Tennessee's 2nd district, died in office. A special election was held to fill the resulting vacancy December 7–8, 1815.

== Election results ==
Candidate	Party	Votes	Percent
William G. Blount	Democratic-Republican	1,583	48.4%
John Cocke	Democratic-Republican	1,355	41.5%
George Dougherty		330	10.1%

Blount took office on January 8, 1816

== See also ==
- List of special elections to the United States House of Representatives
