= Thomas Bines =

American politician

Justice of the Peace of Lower Penns Neck Township
- In office 1822 – April 9, 1826

Member of the U.S. House of Representatives from New Jersey's at-large district
- In office November 2, 1814 – March 3, 1815
- Preceded by: Jacob Hufty

Sheriff of Salem County
- In office 1808–1810

Personal details
- Born: Trenton, New Jersey, US
- Died: April 9, 1826 Lower Penns Neck Township, New Jersey, US
- Party: Democratic-Republican

Thomas Bines (died April 9, 1826) was an American politician who served briefly as a U.S. representative from New Jersey from 1814 to 1815.

== Biography ==
Born in Trenton, New Jersey, Bines attended the common schools.

=== Early career ===
He was appointed coroner for Salem County on October 16, 1802.

Bines was elected sheriff of Salem County in 1808 and served until 1810.

=== Congress ===
Bines was elected as a Democratic-Republican to the Thirteenth Congress to fill the vacancy caused by the death of United States Representative Jacob Hufty (November 2, 1814 – March 3, 1815). He was not a candidate for renomination to the Fourteenth Congress in 1814.

=== Later career ===
Bines was elected Justice of the Peace of Lower Penns Neck Township, New Jersey, in 1822 and served in this capacity until 1826.

=== Death ===
He died in Lower Penns Neck Township, Salem County, April 9, 1826.

U.S. House of Representatives
Preceded by Jacob Hufty	Member of the U.S. House of Representatives from New Jersey's 3rd congressional district 1814–1815	Succeeded by Seat B eliminated
