= 1814 United States elections =

- ← 1812 1813 1814 1815 1816 → Midterm elections
- Incumbent president: ▌James Madison (DR)
- Next Congress: 14th

Senate elections
- Overall control: Democratic-Republican hold
- Seats contested: 12 of 36 seats
- Net seat change: Federalist +1

House elections
- Overall control: Democratic-Republican hold
- Seats contested: All 183 voting seats
- Net seat change: Democratic-Republican +5

Elections occurred in the middle of Democratic-Republican President James Madison's second term, during the First Party System. Members of the 14th United States Congress were chosen in this election. During the 14th Congress, Indiana joined the union. The election took place during the War of 1812.

The Democratic-Republicans continued to dominate both houses of Congress, and slightly increased their majority in the House. The Federalists picked up a small number of seats in the Senate.

== See also ==
- 1814–15 United States House of Representatives elections
- 1814–15 United States Senate elections
