= 1815 New York's 6th congressional district special election =

In March 1815, Jonathan Fisk (DR), who'd been re-elected to New York's 6th district, resigned to accept an appointment as United States Attorney for the Southern District of New York. A special election was held in April of that year to fill the vacancy left by his resignation.

== Election results ==
| Candidate | Party | Votes | Percent |
|---|---|---|---|
| James W. Wilkin | Democratic-Republican | 1,429 | 59.2% |
| Samuel S. Seward | Federalist | 981 | 40.6% |

Wilkin took his seat at the start of the 14th Congress.

== See also ==
- List of special elections to the United States House of Representatives
