= 1814 North Carolina gubernatorial election =

- November 29, 1814
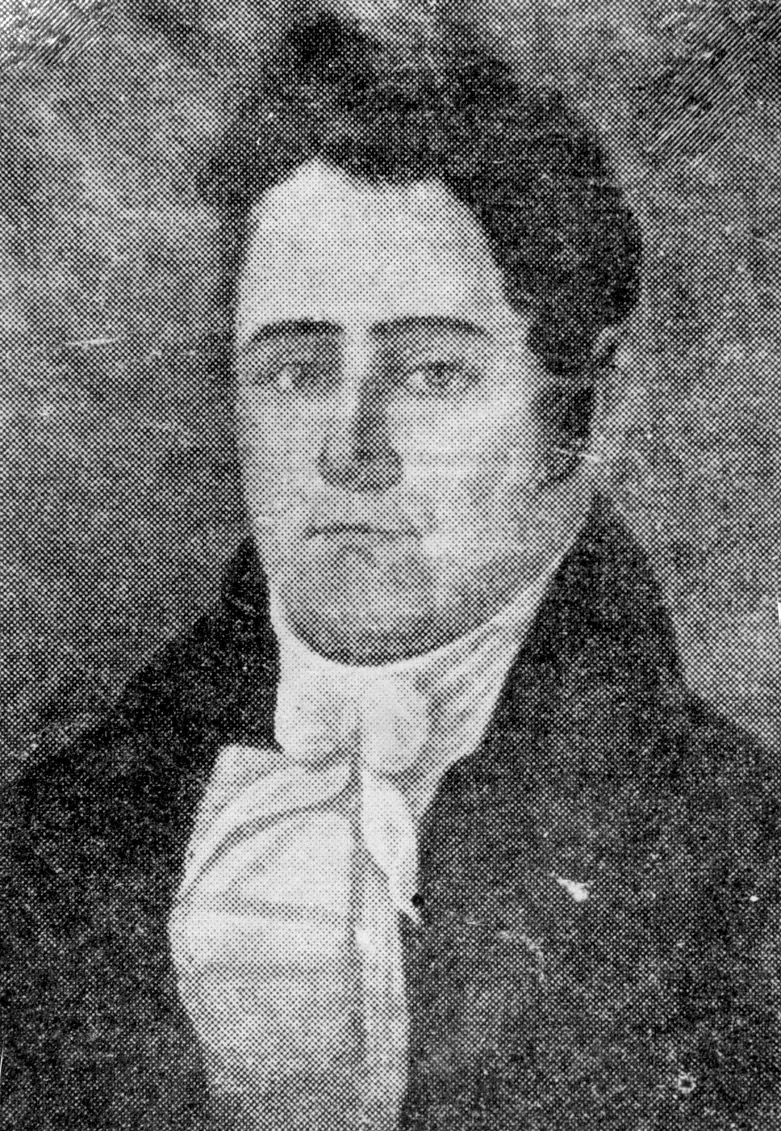

Nominee	William Miller	William Polk	George Outlaw
Party	Democratic-Republican	Federalist	Democratic-Republican
Popular vote	95	83	11
Percentage	50.26%	43.92%	5.82%
Governor before election
William Hawkins
Democratic-Republican
Elected Governor
William Miller
Democratic-Republican

The 1814 North Carolina gubernatorial election was held on November 29, 1814, in order to elect the Governor of North Carolina. Democratic-Republican candidate and former Attorney General of North Carolina William Miller was elected by the North Carolina General Assembly against Federalist candidate and former member of North Carolina Council of State William Polk and Democratic-Republican candidate and former member of the North Carolina Senate George Outlaw.

== General election ==
On election day, November 29, 1814, Democratic-Republican candidate William Miller was elected by the North Carolina General Assembly by a margin of 12 votes against his foremost opponent Federalist candidate William Polk, thereby retaining Democratic-Republican control over the office of Governor. Miller was sworn in as the 18th Governor of North Carolina on December 7, 1814.

=== Results ===
North Carolina gubernatorial election, 1814
Party	Candidate	Votes	%
Democratic-Republican	William Miller	95	50.26
Federalist	William Polk	83	43.92
Democratic-Republican	George Outlaw	11	5.82
Total votes		189	100.00
Democratic-Republican hold			
