= 1814 Massachusetts's 4th congressional district special election =

A special election was held in Massachusetts's 4th congressional district on May 23, 1814, to fill a vacancy left by the resignation of William M. Richardson (DR) on April 18, 1814.

== Election returns ==
Candidate	Party	Votes	Percent
Samuel Dana	Democratic-Republican	2,409	57.6%
Asahel Stearns	Federalist	1,770	42.4%

Dana took his seat September 22, 1814. His opponent in this election would go on to defeat him in the general elections later that year.

== See also ==
- List of special elections to the United States House of Representatives
