= 1814 Kentucky's 2nd congressional district special election =

A special election was held in Kentucky's 2nd congressional district in 1814 to fill a vacancy left by the resignation of Henry Clay (DR) on January 19, 1814, to accept a diplomatic position to the United Kingdom.

== Election results ==
Candidate	Party	Votes	Percent
Joseph H. Hawkins	Democratic-Republican	1,515	47.1%
George Trotter Jr.	Federalist	1,373	42.7%
William B. Blackburn	Democratic-Republican	329	10.2%

Hawkins took his seat March 29, 1814, during the 2nd (of 3) Session of the 13th Congress. Hawkins did not run for re-election in the 14th Congress and was succeeded by Henry Clay again.

== See also ==
- List of special elections to the United States House of Representatives
