= 1815 Pennsylvania's 3rd congressional district special election =

On July 2, 1815, Representative-elect Amos Ellmaker (DR) of Pennsylvania's 3rd district resigned after being appointed and commissioned president judge of the Twelfth Judicial District of Pennsylvania, composed of the counties of Dauphin, Lebanon, and Schuylkill, and before the 14th Congress' first session began. A special election was held on October 10, 1815, to fill the vacancy left by his resignation.

== Election results ==
| Candidate | Party | Votes | Percent |
|---|---|---|---|
| James M. Wallace | Democratic-Republican | 5,016 | 55.4% |
| Phillip Gloninger | Federalist | 4,031 | 44.6% |

Wallace took his seat on December 4, 1815 at the start of the 1st session of the 14th Congress.

== See also ==
- List of special elections to the United States House of Representatives
