= Asa Adgate =

American politician (1767–1832)

Member of the U.S. House of Representatives from New York's 12th district
- In office December 7, 1815 – March 3, 1817
- Preceded by: Zebulon Shipherd
- Succeeded by: John Palmer

Personal details
- Born: November 17, 1767 Kings District, Province of New York, British America (now Canaan, New York)
- Died: February 15, 1832 (aged 64) Ausable Chasm, New York, U.S.
- Party: Democratic-Republican
- Spouses: Annar (Anna) Allen Adgate; Anna Waterman Adgate
- Children: Theodore Adgate; Julia F. Adgate; Eunice Baldwin Adgate; Asa Adgate; Catharine Warner Adgate

Asa Adgate (November 17, 1767 – February 15, 1832) was an iron manufacturer, farmer, and local government official who was selected to fill the vacancy in the United States House of Representatives caused by the death of Benjamin Pond.

== Biography ==
Adgate was born in Kings District (now known as Canaan) in the Province of New York in 1767, the son of Judge Matthew Adgate and Eunice Baldwin Adgate. He married Annar (Anna) Allen on January 28, 1798, and they had four children, Theodore, Julia, Eunice, and Asa. He married Anna Waterman on August 22, 1819, and they had one daughter, Catherine.

== Career ==
In 1793, Adgate moved to what became known as Adgates Falls (now Ausable Chasm) in New York, and engaged in the manufacture of iron and agricultural pursuits there. The same year, the town of Peru, New York, was reorganized, and Adgate was elected to the office of town clerk, and reelected to the same office in 1794. He continued to serve in a number of positions, including supervisor in 1795, assessor from 1796 to 1797, as well as commissioner of schools in 1798. That same year, he was elected to the New York State Assembly. He also served as a lieutenant of infantry in the New York State Militia from October 7, 1793 to January 16, 1800 when his resignation was accepted. In 1799, he was appointed by New York Governor John Jay to the first commission of the peace for Essex County, New York, to be one of the judges of the court of common pleas. He remained in that position for several years.

In 1815, Adgate was elected as a Democratic-Republican to fill the vacancy in the United States House of Representatives caused by the death of Benjamin Pond and served in that body for the remainder of the term, from December 4, 1815, to March 3, 1817. He chose not to run for reelection, and resumed his earlier occupations, including another term in the New York State Assembly in 1823.

== Death ==
Adgate died at the Ausable Chasm in New York, on February 15, 1832, at the age of 64. He is interred at Ausable Chasm Cemetery, Ausable Township, Clinton County, New York.

U.S. House of Representatives
Preceded by Elisha I. Winter, Zebulon R. Shipherd	Member of the U.S. House of Representatives from New York's 12th congressional district 1815–1817 with John Savage	Succeeded by John Savage, John Palmer
