= John Savage (New York politician) =

American politician and lawyer (1779–1863)

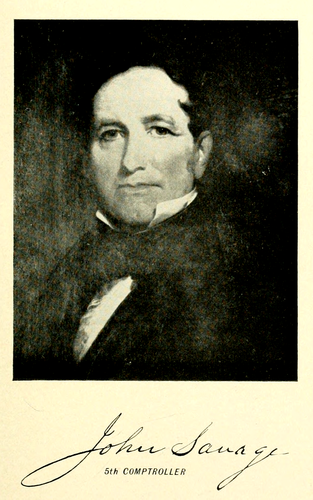

Chief Justice of the New York Supreme Court
- In office 1823–1837
- Preceded by: Ambrose Spencer
- Succeeded by: Samuel Nelson

New York State Comptroller
- In office 1821–1823
- Governor: DeWitt Clinton; Joseph C. Yates
- Preceded by: Archibald McIntyre
- Succeeded by: William L. Marcy

Member of the U.S. House of Representatives from New York's 12th district
- In office March 4, 1815 – March 4, 1819
- Preceded by: Elisha I. Winter; Zebulon R. Shipherd
- Succeeded by: Ezra C. Gross; Nathaniel Pitcher

Personal details
- Born: February 22, 1779 Salem, New York, U.S.
- Died: October 19, 1863 (aged 84) Utica, New York, U.S.
- Resting place: Forest Hill Cemetery; Utica, New York, U.S.
- Party: Democratic
- Spouse: Ruth Wheeler
- Education: Union College
- Profession: Attorney; judge; politician

John Savage (February 22, 1779, in Salem, Washington County, New York – October 19, 1863, in Utica, Oneida County, New York) was an American lawyer and politician.

== Early life ==
Savage was born on February 22, 1779, in Salem, New York. He was the son of Mary (née McNaughton) Savage and Edward Savage, who served in the Penobscot Expedition and enlisted in Col. Samuel McCobb's regiment during the American Revolutionary War.

He graduated from Union College in 1799. Then he studied law, was admitted to the bar in 1800.

== Career ==
After being admitted to the bar, Savage commenced practice in Salem, N.Y. He was District Attorney of the Fourth District from 1806 to 1811, and from 1812 to 1815, his jurisdiction comprising Washington, Essex, Clinton and St. Lawrence Counties, from 1808 on also Franklin County, and from 1813 on also Warren County.

He was a member from Washington and Warren Counties of the New York State Assembly in 1814. He was elected as a Democratic-Republican to the Fourteenth and Fifteenth United States Congresses, serving from March 4, 1815, to March 3, 1819.

He was District Attorney of Washington County from 1818 to 1820. He was New York State Comptroller from 1821 to 1823. He was chief justice of the New York Supreme Court from 1823 to 1837. In 1828, he was appointed Treasurer of the United States, but declined. He was a presidential elector on the Democratic ticket in 1844.

== Personal life ==
Savage was married to Ruth Wheeler (1784–1837). Ruth was the daughter of Anna (née Lyman) Wheeler and Gideon Wheeler, who also fought in the Revolutionary War under Capt. David Wheeler and Capt. Asa Barnes. Together they were the parents of:

- Mary Ann Savage (1819–1846), who married Ward Hunt (1810–1886), the Chief Judge of the New York Court of Appeals, and an associate justice of the U.S. Supreme Court.

Savage died on October 19, 1863, in Utica, New York. He was buried at the Forest Hill Cemetery in Utica.

U.S. House of Representatives
Preceded by Elisha I. Winter, Zebulon R. Shipherd	Member of the U.S. House of Representatives from New York's 12th congressional district 1815–1819 with Asa Adgate 1815–17 and John Palmer 1817–19	Succeeded by Ezra C. Gross, Nathaniel Pitcher
Political offices
Preceded by Archibald McIntyre	New York State Comptroller; 1821–1823	Succeeded by William L. Marcy
Legal offices
Preceded by Ambrose Spencer	Chief Justice of the New York Supreme Court; 1823–1837	Succeeded by Samuel Nelson
