= Joseph H. Hawkins =

American politician

Member of the U.S. House of Representatives from Kentucky
- In office March 29, 1814 – March 3, 1815
- Preceded by: Henry Clay
- Succeeded by: Henry Clay
- Constituency: 2nd district

9th Speaker of the Kentucky House of Representatives
- In office December 1812 – December 5, 1814
- Preceded by: John Simpson
- Succeeded by: William T. Barry

Member of the Kentucky House of Representatives
- In office 1810–1813

Personal details
- Born: c. 1785 Lexington, Kentucky
- Died: 1823 New Orleans, Louisiana
- Party: Democratic-Republican
- Occupation: Attorney

Joseph H. Hawkins (c. 1785 – 1823) was a United States Congressman from Kentucky. He was born in Lexington, Kentucky about 1785. He pursued an academic course. He studied law and was admitted to the bar. He was a member of the Kentucky State House of Representatives from 1810 to 1813 and served two years as Speaker.

He was elected as a Republican to the Thirteenth Congress to fill the vacancy caused by the resignation of Henry Clay (1814–1815). Hawkins was not a candidate for renomination in 1814 and resumed the practice of law. He also engaged in mercantile pursuits.

He moved to New Orleans in 1819. Hawkins died in the vicinity of Madisonville, Louisiana (an area on the north shore of Lake Pontchartrain above New Orleans) in 1823 of yellow fever, worsened while helping distressed sailors near the shore of the lake behind his home. His financial contributions aided Stephen F. Austin and others in the colonization of Texas. His son Norbonne Hawkins was killed at Goliad.

U.S. House of Representatives
Preceded by Henry Clay	Member of the U.S. House of Representatives from Kentucky's 2nd congressional district 1814–1815	Succeeded by Henry Clay
