= 1814 Ohio's 6th congressional district special election =

A special election was held in Ohio's 6th congressional district on June 7, 1814, to fill a vacancy left by the resignation of Reasin Beall (DR) to accept an appointment to the Federal Land Office in Wooster, Ohio.

== Election results ==
Candidate	Party	Votes	Percent
David Clendenin	Democratic-Republican	1,244	63.6%
Lewis Kinney	Democratic-Republican	342	17.5%
John G. Young	Democratic-Republican	238	12.2%
Thomas G. Jones	Democratic-Republican	119	6.1%

Clendenin took office on December 22.

== See also ==
- List of special elections to the United States House of Representatives
