= 1814 Tennessee's 5th congressional district special election =

A special election was held in Tennessee's 5th congressional district September 15–16, 1814 to fill a vacancy left by the resignation of Felix Grundy (DR) earlier that year.

== Election results ==
Candidate	Party	Votes	Percent
Newton Cannon	Democratic-Republican	2,871	50.2%
Thomas Claiborne	Democratic-Republican	1,482	25.9%
William W. Cooke		890	15.6%
John Reid		480	8.4%

Cannon took his seat on October 15, 1814.

== See also ==
- List of special elections to the United States House of Representatives
