= 1814 Pennsylvania's 2nd congressional district special election =

A special election was held in Pennsylvania's 2nd congressional district on October 11, 1814 to fill a vacancy caused by the resignation of Jonathan Roberts (DR) upon being elected to the Senate.

== Election results ==
Candidate	Party	Votes	Percent
Samuel Henderson	Federalist	4,773	50.4%
John Hahn	Democratic-Republican	4,702	49.6%

Henderson took his seat on November 27, 1814.

== See also ==
- List of special elections to the United States House of Representatives
