= 1814 Massachusetts's 12th congressional district special election =

A special election was held in Massachusetts's 12th congressional district on August 4, 1814, to fill a vacancy left by the resignation of Daniel Dewey (F) on February 24, 1814, having been appointed justice of the Supreme Judicial Court of Massachusetts

== Electoral results ==
Candidate	Party	Votes	Percent
John W. Hulbert	Federalist	2,216	51.4%
William P. Walker	Democratic-Republican	2,098	48.6%

Hulbert took his seat September 26, 1814

== See also ==
- List of special elections to the United States House of Representatives
