= Jacob Hufty =

American politician

Member of the U.S. House of Representatives from New Jersey's At-Large district
- In office March 4, 1809 – May 20, 1814

Member of the New Jersey Legislative Council
- In office 1804–1804
- In office 1806–1807

Personal details
- Born: 1750 New Jersey, US
- Died: May 20, 1814 (aged 63–64) Salem, New Jersey, US
- Occupation: Blacksmith

Jacob Hufty (1750 – May 20, 1814) was a U.S. representative from New Jersey, serving three terms from 1809 to 1814.

== Early life and career ==
Born in New Jersey in 1750, Hufty was a blacksmith by trade. He served as a private in the State militia during the American Revolution, ultimately rising to the rank of major. In 1778, he was deemed an enemy of Great Britain in a letter by Lt. Col. Charles Mawhood.

Hufty served on the Board of Chosen Freeholders representing Salem Township, New Jersey, in 1792 before being elected overseer of the poor and collector in 1793. He served as county justice of Salem County in 1797, county judge in 1798, and county justice and judge in 1804. Between 1801 and 1804, he served as county sheriff. He again served on the freeholder board representing Salem Township between 1800 and 1804 and became director of the board in 1801. He served as a member of the New Jersey Legislative Council (now the New Jersey Senate) in 1804, 1806, and 1807. He was a county collector from 1805 to 1808. He served as judge of Orphans Court from 1805 to 1808. He also served as surrogate in 1808.

== Congress ==
Hufty was elected as a Democratic-Republican to the Eleventh and Twelfth Congresses and as a Federalist to the Thirteenth Congress (March 4, 1809 – May 20, 1814).

== Death and legacy ==
He died on May 20, 1814, in Salem, New Jersey. He was interred in St. John's Episcopal Cemetery, Salem.

In 2014, he was commemorated for his contributions during the Revolution through a joint resolution passed by the New Jersey Legislature.

== See also ==
- List of members of the United States Congress who died in office (1790–1899)

U.S. House of Representatives
Preceded by James Sloan	Member of the U.S. House of Representatives from New Jersey's at-large congressional district 1809–1814	Succeeded by Thomas Ward
