= Zebulon R. Shipherd =

American politician

Zebulon Rudd Shipherd (November 15, 1768 – November 1, 1841) was a United States representative from New York. Born in Granville, Washington County, he completed preparatory studies, studied law with Roger Skinner, was admitted to the bar, and commenced practice in Granville. His wife, Elizabeth Bull, had one child, Fayette. Elizabeth (known as Betsey) and Zebulon had two children together, John J Shipherd (co-founder of both Oberlin and Olivet Colleges) and Minerva Shipherd.

Shipherd was elected as a Federalist to the Thirteenth Congress (March 4, 1813 – March 3, 1815). He resumed the practice of his profession in Granville and was a trustee of Middlebury College (in Middlebury, Vermont) from 1819 to 1841. He moved to Moriah, Essex County about 1830, where he died in 1841; interment was in the Moriah Corners Cemetery. He was also a slaveowner.

U.S. House of Representatives
Preceded by Arunah Metcalf	Member of the U.S. House of Representatives from New York's 12th congressional district 1813–1815 with Elisha I. Winter	Succeeded by John Savage, Asa Adgate
