= John Lovett (American politician) =

American politician (1761–1818)

Member of the U.S. House of Representatives from New York's 9th district
- In office March 4, 1813 – March 3, 1817
- Preceded by: Thomas Sammons
- Succeeded by: Rensselaer Westerlo

Member of the New York State Assembly
- In office 1800–1801

Personal details
- Born: February 20, 1761 Lisbon, Connecticut, British America
- Died: August 12, 1818 (aged 57) Fort Meigs, Ohio, U.S.
- Party: Federalist
- Education: Yale College

John Lovett (February 20, 1761 – August 12, 1818) was an American politician from New York.

== Life ==
Lovett graduated from Yale College in 1782. He moved to Albany, New York, and thence to Fort Miller, where he was employed as general agent and land steward. Then he moved to Lansingburgh. He was member from Rensselaer County of the New York State Assembly in 1800-01.

Afterwards he returned to Albany and was Clerk of the Common Council until the outbreak of the War of 1812 during which he was military secretary to Major General Stephen Van Rensselaer. Lovett was wounded at the Battle of Queenston Heights in October 1812, and returned to Albany. He was Clerk of Albany County from 1813 to 1815.

Lovett was elected as a Federalist to the 13th and 14th United States Congresses, holding office from March 4, 1813, to March 3, 1817.

Afterwards he settled at Perrysburg, Ohio but died the next year.

== Sources ==
- United States Congress. "John Lovett (id: L000466)". Biographical Directory of the United States Congress.
- The New York Civil List compiled by Franklin Benjamin Hough (pages 70, 174, 288 and 385; Weed, Parsons and Co., 1858)

U.S. House of Representatives
Preceded by Thomas Sammons	Member of the U.S. House of Representatives from New York's 9th congressional district 1813–1817	Succeeded by Rensselaer Westerlo
