= Elisha I. Winter =

American politician (1781–1849)

Member of the U.S. House of Representatives from New York's 12th district
- In office March 4, 1813 – March 3, 1815 Serving with Zebulon R. Shipherd
- Preceded by: Arunah Metcalf
- Succeeded by: John Savage; Asa Adgate

Personal details
- Born: July 15, 1781 New York City, U.S.
- Died: June 30, 1849 (aged 67) Lexington, Kentucky, U.S.
- Resting place: Lexington Cemetery, Lexington, Kentucky, U.S.
- Party: Federalist
- Spouse: Virginia Carr
- Profession: Politician

Elisha I. Winter (July 15, 1781 – June 30, 1849) was a U.S. representative from New York.

== Biography ==
Born in New York City on July 15, 1781, in 1806 Winter moved to the portion of the town of Peru, Clinton County, which was later included in the township of Au Sable. While living in Clinton County he became involved in mining iron ore from a location known as the Winter Ore Bed.

He was elected as a Federalist to the Thirteenth Congress (March 4, 1813 – March 3, 1815). Winter was an unsuccessful candidate for reelection in 1814 to the Fourteenth Congress.

He later moved to a farm near Lexington, Kentucky, and became a planter and was active in other ventures, including ownership of a general store. He was also instrumental in building the first railroad in that locality, and subsequently became president of the Lexington and Ohio Railroad. Winter was a slave owner. According to the 1820 census, he owned one slave, a woman between ages 14 and 25.

Winter died in Lexington, Kentucky on June 30, 1849, and was interred in Lexington Cemetery.

== Sources ==
- United States Congress. "Elisha I. Winter (id: W000644)". Biographical Directory of the United States Congress.

U.S. House of Representatives
Preceded by Arunah Metcalf	Member of the U.S. House of Representatives from New York's 12th congressional district 1813–1815 with Zebulon R. Shipherd	Succeeded by John Savage, Asa Adgate
