= Benjamin Pond =

American politician

Bemjamin Pond

Member of the U.S. House of Representatives from New York's 8th district
- In office March 4, 1811 – March 3, 1813
- Preceded by: John Thompson
- Succeeded by: Samuel Sherwood

Personal details
- Born: 1768 Stockbridge Province of Massachusetts Bay, British America
- Died: October 6, 1814 (aged 45–46) Schroon, New York, U.S.
- Resting place: Riverside Cemetery, Elizabethtown, New York, U.S.
- Party: Democratic-Republican

Benjamin Pond (1768 – October 6, 1814) was a United States representative from New York.

== Early life ==
He was born in Stockbridge in the Province of Massachusetts Bay in 1768. He attended the common schools, became a farmer, and moved to Poultney, Vermont, in 1800. He later moved to a portion of Crown Point which was included in the town of Schroon at Schroon's founding, and was subsequently incorporated into the town of North Hudson, New York.

== Political career ==
His political career began in 1804 when he became a justice of the peace and Schroon's town supervisor. In 1808 he was appointed judge of the Essex County court of common pleas, and he served until his death. Pond served in the New York State Assembly from 1808 to 1810.

In 1810 Pond was elected as a Democratic-Republican to the Twelfth Congress (March 4, 1811 – March 3, 1813).

During the War of 1812 he served in the New York Militia as a matross in Captain Russell Walker's company of the 6th Artillery Regiment. He participated in the defense of northern New York and took part in the September, 1814 Battle of Plattsburgh.

== Death ==
In 1814 Pond was elected to the Fourteenth Congress, the term of which was scheduled to begin on March 4, 1815. He died in Schroon on October 6, 1814, of disease incurred through exposure at the Battle of Plattsburgh, and so never took his seat in the Fourteenth Congress.

Pond was buried in North Hudson's Pine Ridge Cemetery. On September 3, 1923, he was re-interred in Elizabethtown, New York's Riverside Cemetery.

== Resources ==
- United States Congress. "Benjamin Pond (id: P000425)". Biographical Directory of the United States Congress.

U.S. House of Representatives
Preceded by John Thompson	Member of the U.S. House of Representatives from New York's 8th congressional district 1811–1813	Succeeded by Samuel Sherwood
