= Romulus Linney =

Romulus Linney may refer to:

- Romulus Zachariah Linney (1841-1910), American politician
- Romulus Linney (playwright) (1930-2011), American playwright and great-grandson of above
