= Gdańsk Shakespeare Festival =

International theatre festival in Gdańsk, Poland

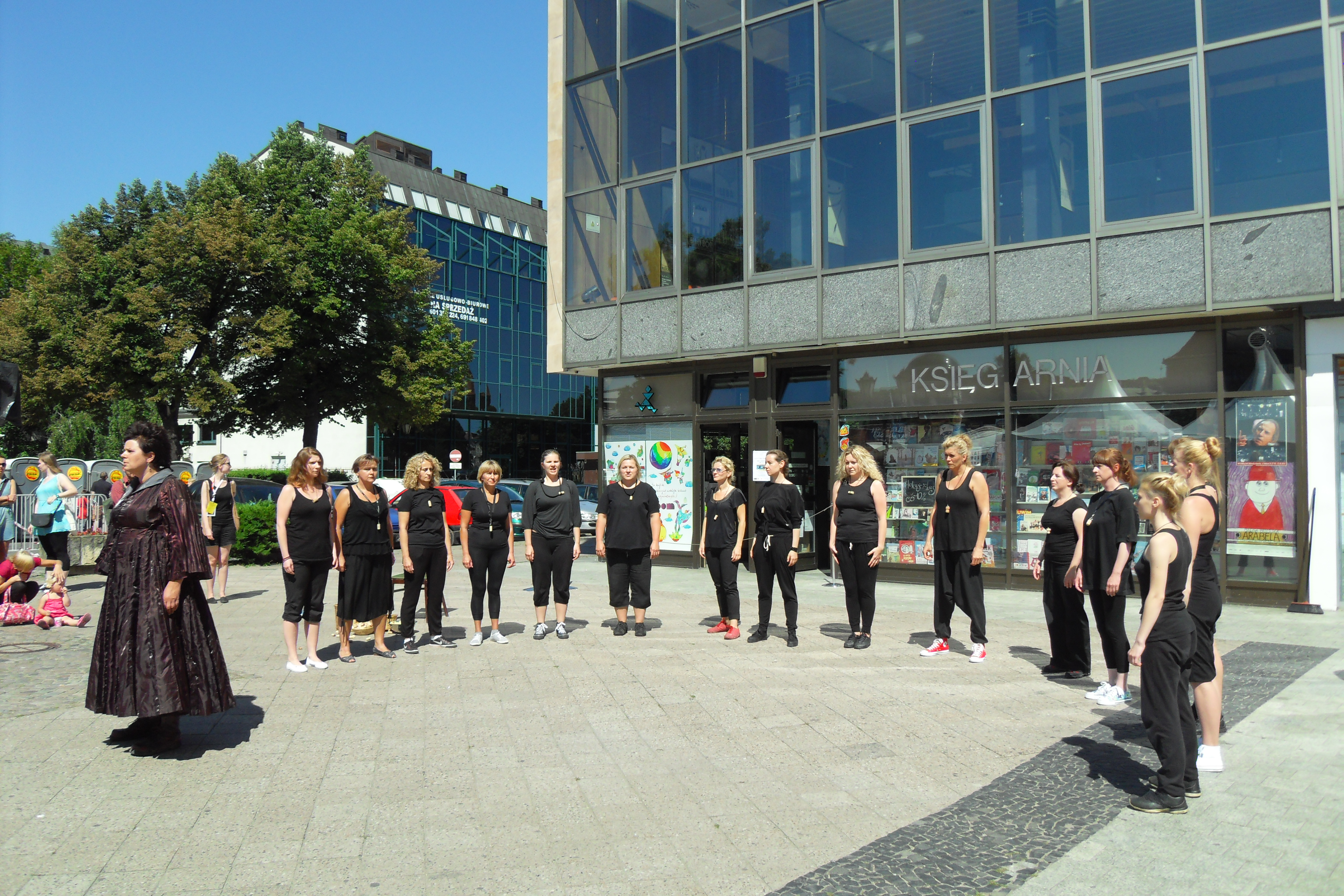
Gdańsk Shakespeare Festival in 2013

Gdańsk Shakespeare Festival is an international theatre festival devoted to the idea of the Elizabethan theatre, and especially to the works of William Shakespeare. The event was first organized in 1993, on the initiative of Theatrum Gedanense Foundation, which had been created by Professor Jerzy Limon and Władysław Zawistowski, with Charles, Prince of Wales as its patron. Its original name, "Gdańsk Shakespeare Days" was transformed into "Gdańsk Shakespeare Festival" in 1997, during the celebration of Gdańsk's millennium.

The Festival is held annually during the first week of August. Most of the plays are performed on the theatre scenes of Gdańsk, Sopot, and Gdynia (Tricity). Some are shown in spaces such as St. John's Church, the former Royal Gun Factory, or Gdańsk Shipyard and in the open air.

The Festival aims at presenting and popularizing the output of William Shakespeare by presentation of his plays, but also by other means. After the performances the public can meet with directors and actors. Within the framework of the festival an educational program for students is organized as well. It is called "Letnia Akademia Szekspirowska" (Summer Shakespeare Academy).

== Golden Yorick prize ==
It is a prize given every year to the best Polish staging of the Shakespearean play in a theatre season. It has been awarded by the Theatrum Gedanense Foundation since 1994. Each year the prizewinning performances are invited to participate in the Gdańsk Shakespeare Festival.

=== Winners ===
- 1994 – Love's Labour's Lost Polish Theatre in Warsaw, directed by Maciej Prus
- 1995 – Romeo and Juliet Polish Theatre in Wrocław, directed by Tadeusz Bradecki
- 1996 – the main prize was not awarded, distinction: As You Like It Helena Modrzejewska Theatre in Legnica, directed by Robert Czechowski
- 1997 – As You Like It Dramatic Theatre in Warsaw, directed by Piotr Cieślak
- 1998 – Measure for Measure Old Theatre in Cracow, directed by Tadeusz Bradecki
- 1999 – Coriolanus Helena Modrzejewska Theatre in Legnica, directed by Jacek Głomb and Krzysztof Kopka
- 2000 – The Merry Wives of Windsor Powszechny Theatre in Warsaw, directed by Piotr Cieplak
- 2001 – King Lear Nowa Łódź Theatre, directed by Mikołaj Grabowski
- 2002 – A Midsummer Night's Dream National Theatre in Warsaw, directed by Jerzy Grzegorzewski
- 2003 – The Tempest TR Warszawa, directed by Krzysztof Warlikowski
- 2004 – Richard III Nowy Theatre in Poznań, directed by Janusz Wiśniewski
- 2005 – main prize: The Comedy of Errors Nowy Theatre in Łódź, directed by Maciej Prus, distinction: 2007: Macbeth TR Warszawa, directed by Grzegorz Jarzyna, special prize: H Wybrzeże Theatre in Gdańsk, directed by Jan Klata
- 2006 – Romeo and Juliet Norwid Theatre in Jelenia Góra, directed by Krzysztof Rekowski
- 2007 – Measure for Measure Powszechny Theatre in Warsaw, directed by Anna Augustynowicz
- 2008 – The Tempest Nowy Theatre in Poznań, directed by Janusz Wiśniewski
- 2009 – the main prize was not awarded, First distinction: The Taming of the Shrew Wybrzeże Theatre, directed by Szymon Kaczmarek; Honorary distinction: Othello. Variations on a Theme Stefan Jaracz Theatre, directed by Agata Duda-Gracz in the Competition for the Best Shakespeare Production in the 2008/2009 season.
- 2010 – the main prize was not awarded
- 2011 – the main prize was not awarded
- 2012 – Richard III, directed by Grzegorz Wiśniewski, Stefan Jaracz Theatre in Łódź.
- 2013 – Everyone must die someday, Porcelanko, or: a thing about the Trojan War. A performance by Agata Duda-Gracz inspired by William Shakespeare’s Troilus and Cressida, Juliusz Słowacki Theatre in Cracow
- 2014 – The Taming of the Shrew directed by Katarzyna Deszcz, Żeromski Theatre in Kielce
- 2015 – King Lear directed by Jan Klata, Old Theatre in Cracow
- 2016 – Julius Caesar, directed by Barbara Wysocka, Powszechny Theatre in Warsaw
- 2017 – the main prize was not awarded
- 2018 – the main prize was not awarded
- 2019 – The Merchant of Venice directed by Szymon Kaczmarek, Witkacy New Theatre in Słupsk
- 2020 – no award due to the COVID-19 pandemic
- 2021 – Hamlet directed by Bartosz Szydłowski, Juliusz Słowacki Theatre in Cracow
- 2022 – Romeos & Julias unplagued. Traumstadt, Polish Theatre of Dance in Poznań and Bodytalk in Münster
- 2023 – Romeo and Juliet, Juliusz Słowacki Theatre in Cracow
- 2024 – The Tempest. Island Laws directed by Katarzyna Minkowska, Kochanowski Theatre in Opole
- 2025 – The Winter's Tale directed by Pamela Leończyk

== Accompanying events ==
Summer Shakespeare Academy consists of theatrical and creative workshops conducted by Polish artists and famous foreign personalities. The participants are encouraged to develop their passions for theatre, dance, photography or painting.

Shakespeare Daily is the newspaper that has accompanied the festival for many years. It is created and edited by the participants of journalism workshops. It contains the information about festival events, reviews, and articles about plays and artists.

'Dolne Miasto Górą' (which could be translated as "Dolne Miasto is the Best") is the common name of various artistic workshops organised in Dolne Miasto and Orunia (districts of Gdańsk). It is also called "Shakespeare mania" and consists of free workshops for children and teenagers conducted by young artists from Gdańsk. The project was created by Joanna Śnieżko-Misterek, Teatrum Gedanense Foundation and Gdańsk Shakespeare Theatre. The aim of the action is to make the youth conscious of their abilities and to help them develop their interests and self-esteem. The end of the workshops is always celebrated with a theatrical parade. Actors, human-shaped puppets and various artists, together with the residents of Dolne Miasto, march along Długi Targ, which is the centre of the Old Town of Gdańsk.

The events do not end with the festival's last day. After the festival photographic and literary competitions are organised. Each year a competition for the best festival photograph and review is held. There is also an annual exhibition of the works of young independent artists.

== Editions of the festival ==
=== 13th Shakespeare Festival ===
13th Shakespeare Festival was held 1–10 August 2009. It was the first edition of the festival that had a theme – multimedia. Many of the festival theatre groups employed multimedia in their performances. The event was accompanied by an international conference on the phenomenon of multimedia arts in the theatre: Blending the Media. Art in the theatre/theatre in the arts. Among the guests of the conference were such theatre studies stars as Marvin Carlson, Patrice Pavis, Bryan Reynolds, Erika Fischer-Lichte czy Eli Rozik. A lecture was given by Elizabeth LeCompte, the founding member and the director of an experimental theater collective – The Wooster Group.

It was during this edition that festival performances could be seen outside the Tricity for the first time. This event was called Shakespeare in Pomerania Region. "A Midsummer Night's Dream" by the Globe Theatre was shown in Słupsk, Pruszcz Gdański, and Kościerzyna.

Performances of the main stage:

- HAMLET/Amleto. Nella Carne il Silenzio – Compagnia Laboratorio di Pontendera (Italy)
- The Merchant of Venice and A Midsummer Night's Dream – two performances by Propeller company from Watermill Theatre, Great Britain
- Hamlet – The Wooster Group (USA)
- Warum, Warum directed by Peter Brook – Miriam Goldschmidt's monodrama
- A Midsummer Night's Dream – Globe Theatre (Great Britain)
- The Merchant of Venice – Bremer Shakespeare Company (Germany)
- The Taming of the Shrew – The Wybrzeże Theatre (Poland), First distinction in the Golden Yorick competition
- King Richard III – co-production of two theatres: The Hungarian Theatre of Cluj (Romania) and The Gyulai Castle Theatre (Hungary)
- Othello. Variations on a theme – The Stefan Jaracz Theatre, Łódź (Poland), Honorary distinction in the Golden Yorick Competition
- Hamlet – The Radu Stanca National Theatre in Sibiu (Romania)

As a part of Shakespeare Miniature Scenes were shown:

- "O, that this too too solid flesh..." – performance by the students of London Metropolitan University, based on several William Shakespeare's plays (Hamlet, Romeo and Juliet, Much Ado about Nothing, A Midsummer Night's Dream, As You Like It)
- "Hamlet, or the End of Childhood" – The Naxos Theatre Group (France)
- "A Midsummer Night's Dream" by students of the Warsaw Theatrical Academy, the performance based on Shakespeare's play and the music of Philip Glass and King Crimson
- "The Tempest" by The Parrabbola Group in collaboration with Lightwork Theatre company (Great Britain). Klub Zak Theatre. The cast included Brett Brown as Ferdinand, Bryony Hannah as Miranda, Scott Handy as Prospero and David Monteith as Ariel.

=== 12th Shakespeare Festival ===
12th Shakespeare Festival was held 2–9 August 2008. Among the many performances of the year, the festival included a variety of workshops and lectures by distinguished theatre practitioners. Caleb Marshall (Shakespeare Globe Theatre, Great Britain) gave an acting workshop on Romeo and Juliet, Yoshihiro Kurita (Ryutopia Theatre, USA) and Jarosław Bielski (Replika Theatre, Spain) gave acting workshops on Hamlet, and Bryan Reynolds and Chris Marshall (Transversal Theatre, USA) gave a workshop on transversal acting methodology. Ińaki Arana (Real Escuela Superior de Arte Dramatico, Spain) gave an artistic swordplay workshop, and Bare Feet (Zambia) and the Other Side of the Mirror Theatre (Gdańsk) gave African dance and drumming workshops. Also, Lonnie Alcaraz (Transversal Theatre, USA) gave a workshop for lighting directors and Michael Hooker (Transversal Theatre, USA) gave a workshop for sound directors.

Performances of the main stage:

- Macbeth – ARKA theatre, Wrocław
- The Winter's Tale – Ryutopia Theatre, Japan
- Hamlet – Polski Theatre, Wrocław
- SHAKESPEARE SOLO – Ophelia – State Youth Theatre, Armenia
- Richard after Richard – Theatre in the Basket, Ukraine
- Hamletmachine – Odeon Theatre, Romania
- Hamlet – Réplika Theatre, Spain
- Romeo and Juliet – Shakespeare's Globe Theatre, UK
- Measure for Measure – National Theatre, Craiova, Romania
- The Tempest – Nowy Theatre, Poznań
- Lumping in Fargo – Transversal Theater Company, Netherlands

== See also ==
- Gdańsk Shakespeare Theatre
