= GOTE =

GOTE, which stands for "Goal, Obstacle, Tactics, and Expectation", is an acronym devised by Robert Cohen to remind actors of four basic elements to consider while preparing a character for the theater. Coincidentally, GOTE is an anagram of EGOT, which is the acronym describing people (including actors) who have won at least one Emmy, Grammy, Oscar, and Tony award.

Cohen introduced the acronym in his book, Acting One, which has become one of the most widely used textbooks for college theater students in the United States. GOTE is also often taught as part of the larger field of Practical Aesthetics.

== Method ==
The GOTE method, briefly stated, is as follows:

Goal refers to what a character desires—what drives their actions. Goals often involve specific details (e.g. "I want to create peace in the West Bank") but the strong verb (in this case "to create") is the crucial part of the goal because it impels actor and character to action. Beginners may use the verbs "to be," "to get," or a verb in the negative form. These choices often muddy the acting. Teachers differ on using goals that attempt to evoke specific emotions from other characters (e.g. "I want to make him cry.") Such phrasings may put one's scene partner in a difficult position. At the same time characters do not always succeed and this may mitigate problems while this usage may help create emotional vitality. Teachers also differ on using physically oriented goals. Some find them petty while others find they help actors act more convincingly by lending a sense of physical truth in addition to mental/willful truth.

Obstacle refers to what stops the character from achieving their goal. Drama needs (both in terms of practice and the need for interest) conflicts, which arise not only from the goals but from fighting against obstacles to achieve those goals. Obstacles will often define the possible range of tactics (see T), help an actor define emotions, help integrate new information, clarify the drama and plot and many other vital elements. The obstacle, however, should not be "played." In other words the actors should pursue their goals, rather than looking whiny about their obstacle. Note: O can also stand for "Other" in which case it refers to the other characters in the scene. Ideally, actors see other people in the play as the object of goals or tactics for good interplay.

Tactics refers to the methods used to achieve goals. Tactics can range from totally threatening to wholly inducing, and usually actors should use a wide variety to create believable interactions. If an actor has, for instance, the goal "to threaten" then various tactics might be used to threaten. One might threaten the character, the character's family, livelihood, etc. If none of these tactics work the actor may try more inducing tactics (in this case maybe implicit threats) or change their goal altogether to something more likely to achieve their expectation (see E). If an actor follows Cohen completely, they find they should justify every word and gesture as a tactic. Usually tactics color different attempts at the goal, but occasionally they themselves are verbs and are like small, short goals. The difference between tactics and goals may become mainly a question of the length.

Expectation refers to one's expectation of succeeding in achieving goals. If one did not expect to achieve one's goals then one would not pursue them. Ultimately the script may have the character fail but the actor should always act as if they believe they can succeed. Expectation can also involve the character's journey. In this case goals cover anywhere from a "beat" to a scene. They become smaller units moving toward the expectation and goal and expectation usually become related as a when/then statement (e.g. "when I convince (goal with a strong verb) him (the other) of my plan then I can take over the company and be rich (expectation.)" The actor using this fictional GOTE should also find various tactics, or ways of "convincing."

Any or all of these aspects can shift at any time during and there should probably be at the very least one goal per scene. Many actors like to also use an overall character goal (or expectation) for the play or even for the character's life in addition to getting a handle on smaller "beats" with a GOTE.

== In acting ==
Actors use a GOTE by actually trying to do what their character is doing, at least on the level of actions (relying on the truth of a body responding to will). A GOTE actor often has a nuanced idea of how and why a character acts. This would result in self-conscious, introverted acting except that a GOTE is only useful when it manifests in action. In fact, proponents of GOTE do not want actors to lose themselves in their characters' psyches. So instead of dangerously ceding control to personal emotions, actors who use GOTE rely on action. The rely on their cast members for safety in that environment and in turn protect their cast members by their very use of GOTE, which is always completely under their command.

Once an actor figures out the GOTE for the character ("getting the character's GOTE"), they find a greater understanding of the character and hopefully will begin to make discoveries about tone and style and giving them a language to talk to the director. Even more practically the actor will have an easier time in rehearsal since many actors use it to determine movements because, often, GOTE entirely determines said characters' movements. Finally the actor can play that character with passion and intensity, and thus create an enjoyable and memorable performance.

== See also ==
- Practical Aesthetics
- Acting
