= Robert Cohen (playwright) =

American dramatist (1938–2024)

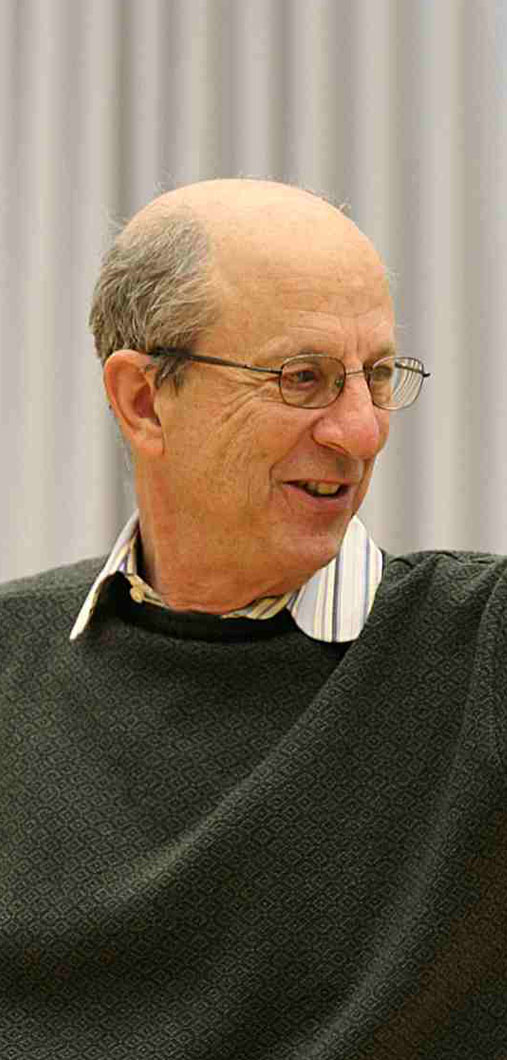
Cohen in 2008

Robert Cohen (1938 – November 15, 2024) was an American academic, theatre director, playwright, and drama critic. A Claire Trevor Professor emeritus after 50 years teaching at the University of California, Irvine since 1965, he continued to write, and has published many books on theatre, along with articles, dramatic anthologies and many plays, and has conducted advanced teaching residencies in numerous countries and much of the United States. He has been called a Master Teacher by the Voice and Speech Trainers Association, has been praised as a "walking theatre directory and encyclopedia" by his fellow teachers, and has been honored during his career with the Polish Medal of Honor, the Honoris Causa Professor Degree at Babes-Bolyai University in Romania, UCI's Distinguished Professor of Research, and the Career Achievement Award from the Association for Theatre in Higher Education.

== Biography ==
Cohen was born in 1938 in Washington, D.C. His theatrical education began as an undergraduate student at Dartmouth College and UC Berkeley and earned his DFA (Doctorate in Fine Arts) in 1965 at the Yale School of Drama. Soon after, Cohen joined the charter faculty of the brand new campus of the University of California, Irvine, where he served as its founding departmental chair of drama for 25 years, and, from 2015, was an emeritus Bren Fellow and Claire Trevor Professor of Drama for the University.

He was an accomplished director, scholar, drama critic, and theorist, and his approach to stage acting, which employed a system he referred to as "GOTE", a derivative combination of Chekov and Meisner, was acknowledged as one of the most widely used approaches to stage acting in use today.

Cohen resided in Laguna Beach, California, with his wife Lorna. They had two children, Michael and Whitney. Cohen died on November 15, 2024, at the age of 86.

== Directing career ==
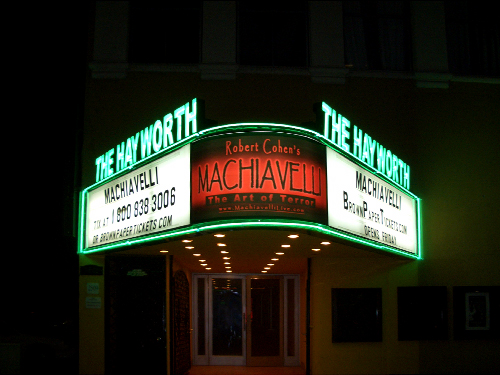
Marquee of the Hayworth Theatre, Los Angeles, for the premiere of Machiavelli: The Art of Terror, August 2006.

Cohen signed his first Equity contract to direct a production of Wilder's Our Town for the Virginia Museum Theater with his Yale classmate Keith Fowler as producer and actor in the role of the Stage Manager. In his directing career he has staged twelve classical productions at the Utah and Colorado Shakespeare Festivals and over ninety stage productions at his Irvine campus and other theatres; his work includes classics like King Lear, Macbeth, and Twelfth Night; his own translations of Tibi’s Law, The Misanthrope, Carmen, The Magic Flute, and Pedro Gynt; and a variety of American musicals including My Fair Lady, Oklahoma!, Sweeney Todd, and Kiss Me, Kate.

In 2006, Cohen directed the premiere of his play Machiavelli: The Art of Terror at the Hayworth Theatre in Los Angeles (photo, left).

Five of Cohen's productions have been seen abroad, in Australia, Romania, Poland and the Czech Republic; two of these, written by Bryan Reynolds, have been with the Transversal Theater Company, a Dutch-American experimental theatre group: Railroad at the Sibiu International Theatre Festival, Romania and The National Theatre, Cluj, Romania, May–June 2006; Blue Shade at Teatr Lalek, Wrocław, Poland; Teatr Modjeska, Legnica, Poland; Teatr 77, Łódź, Poland; Divadlo DISK, Academy of Performing Arts (DAMU), Prague, Czech Republic, May–June 2007; Teatrul Mic, 17th Annual National Theatre Festival, Bucharest, Romania, November 2007.

== Writing career ==
As a writer, Cohen published a wide variety of theatre texts, including Acting One, Acting Two, Acting Power, Acting Professionally: Raw Facts about Careers in Acting, and his latest text, Acting Power: the 21st Century Edition, most of which are used in colleges, universities, and conservatories around the world; some having been translated into Hungarian, Romanian, Finnish, Estonian, Chinese and Korean. His texts explain and demonstrate a system of acting and theatre analysis called GOTE, as well as presenting a series of theatre exercises ranging from beginner to advanced. Cohen's Theatre, now in its eleventh edition, has become one of the leading texts on the history of world theatre. Reviewing this book, the "Revue d'histoire du theatre" noted that: "[The Theatre] was written in a very clear fashion and an elegant and compelling style,… makes for a document that should be found in every library." Cohen's other books include Jean Giraudoux: Three Faces of Destiny, a study of the French playwright; Creative Play Direction, Working Together in Theatre: Collaboration and Leadership, More Power To You; his 2014 autobiography, Falling Into Theatre...and Finding Myself, a memoir, Acting iShakespeare, and his 2015 Shakespeare on Theatre, plus more than three dozen journal articles and four hundred play reviews. Most of his reviews are in the London-published Plays International, while his essays have appeared in Theatre Journal, Theatre Topics, Theatre Forum, Theatre Survey, Modern Drama, Theater der Zeit, Essays in Theatre, On Stage Studies, The Drama Review, Contemporary Literature, Contemporary Literary Criticism, Slavic and East European Performance, Experiment and Innovation, Dramatics, Alternatives Théâtrales, and Dramatic Theory and Criticism.

Cohen's play, Machiavelli: the art of terror (formerly The Prince), published by Dramatic Publishing Company and in Romania and the U.K., has been professionally produced in Los Angeles, Long Beach, Pittsburgh, the Madach Theatre in Budapest and the National Romanian Theatre in Cluj, and in staged readings in New York and Los Angeles. The Moebius Strip premiered at the National Romanian Theatre in Cluj in 2013–16, and his Bzaap! premiered with the Transversal Theatre Company in Amsterdam in 2014 and the National Romanian Theatre in Cluj in 2016. His dramatic translations (The Bourgeois Gentleman, The Misanthrope, Clizia, and Tibi's Law), and his opera translations (The Magic Flute, Carmen) have been both produced and published widely.

== International reputation as lecturer ==
Internationally, Cohen has lectured and/or conducted multi-day "Acting Power" residencies at the Theatre Academy of Bucharest (Romania), the Korean National University for the Art(Seoul), the Shanghai Theatre Academy (China), the University of Ghana (Legon), the National Theatre of Ghana (Accra), the Hungarian National Theatre and Film Academy (Budapest), the Hong Kong Academy for the Performing Arts, the Hong Kong Repertory Theatre, the Queensland Institute of Technology (Brisbane, Australia), the Sibiu International Theatre Festival (Romania), the Estonian Theatre Union (Tallinn), Teatterikorkeakoulu (the Finnish National Theatre Academy, Helsinki), the University of Jyvaskala (Finland), the University of Tampere (Finland), the University of Costa Rica (San Jose), the Pécs National Theatre (Hungary), the Hungarian Academy of Sciences (Pécs), the International Amateur Theatre Association (headquartered in Copenhagen, event took place in Tampere, Finland), the Association of British Columbia Drama Educators (Vancouver), the National Theatre of Cluj (Romania), the Babes-Bolyai University (Romania), the International Stanislavskij Symposium (Stockholm), and the Royal Dramatic Theatre (Stockholm).

In the United States, Cohen has given keynote speeches at six national and regional acting conferences, and conducted invited multi-day acting residencies at the Actors’ Center (New York City), the Alliance Theatre Conservatory (Atlanta), the Coconut Grove Playhouse (Miami), the Royal Shakespeare Company festival at Davidson College, plus national conferences of the Association for Theatre in Higher Education and the American Alliance for Theatre in Education and regional conferences of the Northwest, Southwest, New England, Texas, South Carolina, and Georgia theatre conferences – along with more than two dozen colleges and universities.

== G.O.T.E. Sheet ==
The methods that Cohen developed in his derivative approach to the training of the actor are represented by the word "GOTE." Cohen's GOTE Sheet consists of four elements of acting, each represented by a letter in the acronym "GOTE":

Goal (of the character)
Other people (that stand in the way of the character's goal)
Tactics (that the character employs)
Expectations (that the character has)

Robert Cohen's approach to stage acting has become one of the most widely used in America today.

== See also ==
- UC Berkeley
- UC Irvine
- Yale School of Drama
- Jean Giraudoux

== Bibliography ==
=== Original plays ===
- Abraham and Isaac in Jerusalem (2010)
- Machiavelli: the art of terror (formerly The Prince) (2004)
- The Moebius Strip (2013)
- Bzzap! (2014)

=== Play translations ===
- Tibi's Law
- The Misanthrope
- Pedro Gynt
- The Bourgeois Gentleman
- The Plaie Called Corpus Christi: The Beginnings
- Clizia

=== Opera translations ===
- Carmen
- The Magic Flute

=== Articles ===
Cohen has published scholarly articles in the following:

- Theatre Journal
- Theatre Topics
- Theatre Forum
- Theatre Survey
- Alternative Théâtrales
- Contemporary Literary Criticism
- Modern Drama
- Theater der Zeit
- Essays in Theatre
- On Stage Studies
- The Drama Review
- Contemporary Literature
- Slavic and East European Performance
- Experiment and Innovation
- Journal of Dramatic Theory and Criticism
- Dramatics

=== Books ===
- Acting Professionally: Raw Facts about Careers in Acting
- Acting One
- Acting Two (formerly Advanced Acting)
- Acting Power
- Acting Power: the 21st Century Edition
- Acting in Shakespeare
- Theatre
- More Power to You
- Dramatic Anthologies
- Creative Play Direction
- Giraudoux: Three Faces of Destiny
- Working Together in Theatre: Collaboration and Leadership*Falling Into Theatre...and finding myself
- Shakespeare on Theatre: A Critical Look at his Theories and Practices
