= Charles Cowles =

Charles Cowles may refer to:

- Charles H. Cowles (1875–1957), North Carolina Republican politician
- Charles Cowles (art dealer) (born 1941), American art dealer and collector of contemporary art
