= Keith Fowler =

American actor (1939-2023)

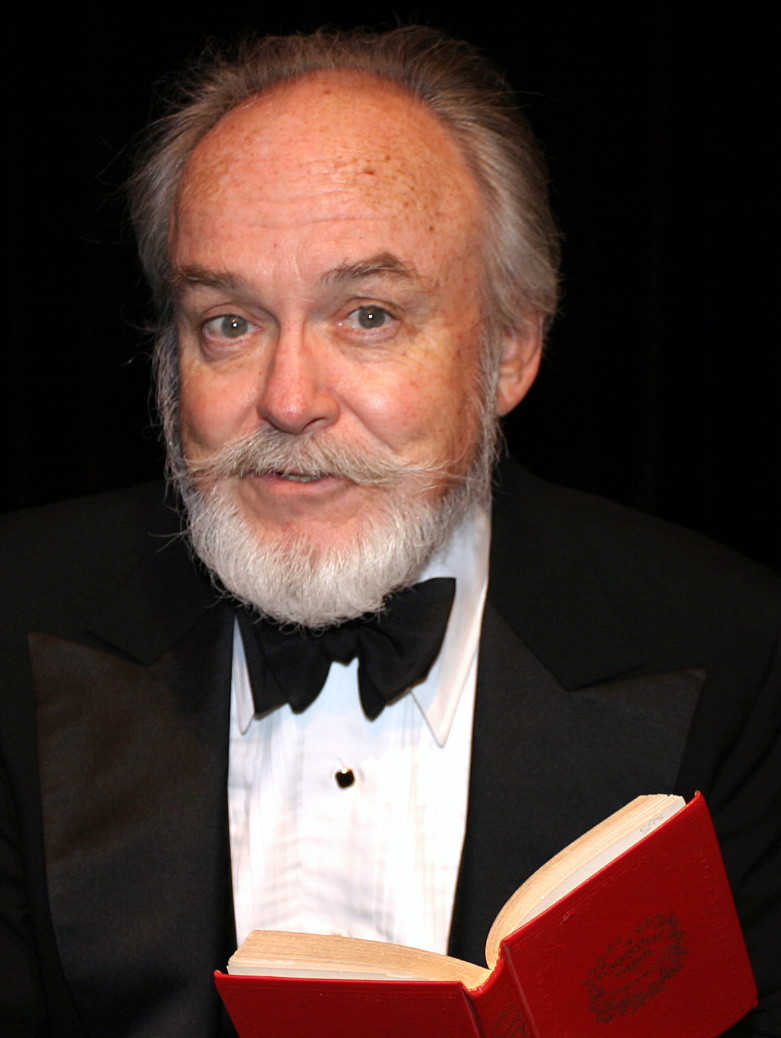
- Fowler in a solo staged reading of A Christmas Carol at the University of California, Irvine
- Born: February 23, 1939; San Francisco, California, U.S.
- Died: December 30, 2023 (aged 84)
- Education: San Francisco State University; Shakespeare Institute; Yale School of Drama (DFA)
- Spouse: Janice Byrd Fowler

Keith Franklin Fowler (February 23, 1939 – December 30, 2023) was an American actor, director, producer, and educator. He was a professor of drama and former head of directing in the Drama Department of the Claire Trevor School of the Arts of the University of California, Irvine (UCI), and the artistic director of two LORT/Equity theaters.

== Early life and career ==
Born in San Francisco on February 23, 1939 to Jack Franklin and Jacqueline Hocking Montgomery Fowler, Fowler was a graduate of George Washington High and San Francisco State University. After residing for his first 21 years in San Francisco, he went to The Shakespeare Institute of the University of Birmingham, UK, and Yale University's School of Drama for graduate work.

After performing children's roles in various San Francisco "little theaters" in the early 1950s, Fowler's first professional acting was with the Oregon Shakespeare Festival in 1958 and 1960. Awarded a Fulbright Grant in 1960-61 to study at the Shakespeare Institute in Stratford-upon-Avon, he directed his first play while in England—the Midlands premiere of Brecht's Mother Courage. The production in spring 1961 at the Stratford Hippodrome led the town's veteran drama critic to compliment the local troupe for daring a type of theater that Sir Peter Hall hesitated to bring to Stratford's just-founded Royal Shakespeare Company.

Fowler received a Wilson Fellowship and Shubert Scholarship to attend the Yale School of Drama, where he earned a doctorate (D.F.A.) studying under Nikos Psacharopoulos, director of the Williamstown Theater Festival in Massachusetts. Psacharopoulos chose Fowler to serve as his assistant, first as resident director of a theater in Holyoke, where Fowler staged productions of J. B., by Archibald MacLeish, and Romeo and Juliet, and then in 1965 as Assistant Director of the main Williamstown Festival, where he directed Oh Dad, Poor Dad... by Arthur Kopit and The Private Ear and the Public Eye by Peter Shaffer. In 1966, he directed his first Macbeth for the Festival Theater in El Paso, treating the tragedy as a psychological nightmare, noted by a local critic as an "expressionistic... exciting departure from the traditional."

In this period, from 1964 to 1968, he also began his academic career as Assistant Professor of Drama at Williams College.

== Virginia Museum Theater ==
In 1969, he was appointed head of the Theater Arts Division of the Virginia Museum of Fine Arts and artistic director of the Virginia Museum Theater (VMT, now the Leslie Cheek Theater), and he undertook to guide VMT in becoming Richmond's first resident Actors Equity company and a home for classics and new plays. His productions, beginning with Marat/Sade (the first racially integrated company on the Virginia Museum's stage), brought controversy into the heart of Richmond's museum district but also drew increased attendance, more than doubling audiences between 1969 and the late 1970s.

=== The "Fowler 'Macbeth'" ===
Dubbing the professional company "VMT Rep", he drew national attention when in 1973 his second staging of Macbeth, a rather more realistic Stonehenge/historical version starring E.G. Marshall, led Clive Barnes of The New York Times to hail it as the "Fowler 'Macbeth.'" Barnes described the production as "splendidly vigorous, forcefully immediate... probably the goriest Shakespearean production I have seen since Peter Brook's 'Titus Andronicus'." Of Fowler, he wrote, "Virginia is lucky to have him." Alfred Drake also joined the company in 1973 to direct the premiere of Richard Stockton's The Royal Rape of Ruari Macasmunde with Fowler in the title role. International attention arrived in 1975 when Soviet Cultural Consul Viktor Sakovich provided coverage on Moscow Television for Fowler's English-language premiere of Maxim Gorky's Our Father (originally Poslednje). Fowler subsequently produced the New York premiere of the Gorky drama at the Manhattan Theater Club.

In 1977, refusing the museum administration's pressure to censor his premiere of Romulus Linney's play Childe Byron, Fowler resigned to serve his Yale alma mater as chief of directing for a year. His departure provoked a public outcry over an alleged pattern of censorship by the museum, with some arts patrons supporting the administration and many standing by Fowler, asserting, for instance, that "no one else can jump in and claim credit for what Dr. Fowler has done ... he stood up for what he knew was right."

== American Revels Company ==
He returned to Richmond in 1978 with his associate director M. Elizabeth Osborn to lease the Empire Theater (since renamed the November Theater), on the border between historically black Jackson Ward and the city's business district, where they founded the American Revels Company. Revels attracted progressive support for appealing to both black and white communities in Richmond. Without intending to enter into Richmond's post-segregation politics, Fowler nevertheless found Revels becoming a rallying point in the late 1970s for re-balancing the two symbiotic communities through art. Funding through the box office and City Council support was affected directly by public favor in a city with a growing black majority.

== Unity Audience ==
Following a summer of advance promotion, American Revels' first season started with strong audiences, including full houses for A Christmas Carol and The Club in the thousand-seat theater. Such peaks in attendance could not be sustained, however, when later play titles, including Othello and I Have a Dream, leaned toward those least likely to afford tickets—the African-American community. Fowler countered by offering free performances to neighboring residents. The plan drew hundreds of African-American theater-goers and began to build a new sector of audience. In the summer of 1979, Richmond's City Council awarded the company a challenge grant, and a patron stepped forward to raise matching funds by sponsoring a performance by entertainer Ray Charles to benefit Revels. The success of the fund drive propelled the company into a second season in which Revels dealt with racial issues head-on by presenting a satire entitled The Black and White Minstrel Show, a parody of the racially split City Council. The season continued with works aimed at all of Richmond. Still the costs of production were higher than the purses and wallets of many in the core audience could support. American Revels closed after two seasons.

The company had made its mark. Revels mounted fourteen productions between 1978 and 1980. By presenting actors of color and dramas with black themes—alongside classics and "standard" works—the company drew a sizable African-American audience to live theater, many for the first time. Richmonders found that new plays and politically engaged works were not alien to their taste. Also, by resurrecting the long-dormant Empire/November Theater, the troupe pioneered the way for downtown professional theater, most significantly for Theatre IV/Virginia Rep, the subsequent occupant of the November. For such a legacy, many Richmonders remember the company fondly, counting the Revels years as a time of theatrical excitement, and Fowler—in the words of Richmond Lifestyle magazine—as a "Rebel with a Cause."

== Teaching ==
After closing Revels, Fowler returned to acting at the Pittsburgh Public Theater and joined Yale classmate Robert Cohen, then chair of drama, on the faculty of the University of California, Irvine.

In 1984, he joined Jerzy Grotowski's "Objective Drama" project in the barn and fields south of the UCI campus, working with Grotowski day and night to explore the essential organons and yantras of performance.

From 1996 to 2004, Fowler was the original director of ArtsBridge America, later expanded nationwide, a program created by then dean Jill Beck at UCI in 1996 for granting scholarships to university dance, drama, music, and studio art majors to reintroduce arts education into the depleted curricula of K-12 pupils in local schools.

== Personal life and death ==
Fowler was married to Janice Byrd Fowler at the time of his death, and had two children and a stepchild. He died on December 30, 2023 at the age of 84.

== Bibliography ==
- Hypnotic Transformation: Three Studies of Theatrical Role-Playing by Keith Fowler in The International Journal of Clinical and Experimental Hypnosis, 1988, vol. XXXVI, No. 4.
- Precise functions of hypnosis in dramatic acting, by Keith Fowler, National Auxiliary Publication Service, 1986.
- "Who is he supposed to be?," by Keith Fowler, in Müller in America, American Productions of Heiner Müller, copyright 2003 by Castillo Cultural Center.
- "The Grotowski Papers," by Keith Fowler, in American Theater, January 2014.
