= E. Spencer Blackburn =

American politician and lawyer (1868–1912)

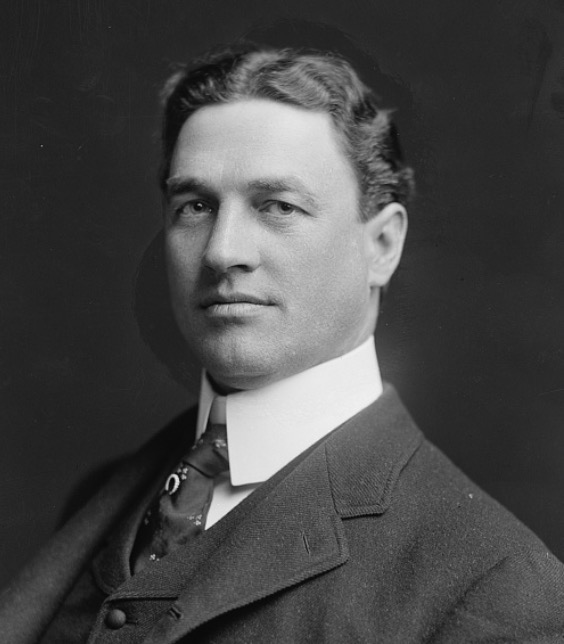
- Portrait of Blackburn by Charles Milton Bell, taken between February 1901 and December 1903

Member of the U.S. House of Representatives from North Carolina's 8th district
- In office March 4, 1901 – March 3, 1903
- Preceded by: Romulus Z. Linney
- Succeeded by: Theodore F. Kluttz
- In office March 4, 1905 – March 3, 1907
- Preceded by: Theodore F. Kluttz
- Succeeded by: Richard N. Hackett

Personal details
- Born: Edmond Spencer Blackburn; September 22, 1868 Boone, North Carolina, US
- Died: March 10, 1912 (aged 43) Elizabethton, Tennessee, US
- Party: Republican
- Relations: Alton B. Parker (uncle-in-law)
- Occupation: Politician, lawyer

Edmond Spencer Blackburn (September 22, 1868 – March 10, 1912) was an American politician and lawyer. A Republican, he was a member of the United States House of Representatives from North Carolina.

== Early life ==
Blackburn was born on September 22, 1868, on a farm near Boone, North Carolina. He was educated at common schools and at Oak Hill Academy. At age 20, he began teaching at Cove Creek Academy.

== Career ==
He read law, and in May 1890, was admitted to the bar, after which he began practicing law in Jefferson. In 1894 and 1895, he was clerk of the North Carolina Senate. In 1898, he was appointed assistant attorney of the United States District Court for the Western District of North Carolina by President William McKinley. He lived in Wilkesboro.

Blackburn was a Republican. He was a candidate for Presidential elector during the 1892 election. In 1896 and 1897, he represented Ashe County in the North Carolina House of Representatives, serving as Speaker pro tempore in 1897. He was a member of the United States House of Representatives from March 4, 1901, to March 3 1903, and again from March 4, 1905, to March 3, 1907, representing North Carolina's 8th district.

During his first term, Blackburn's private secretary was Charles H. Cowles. He lost the election between his two terms, with the loss having stemmed from gerrymandering. In the election following his second term, he was not chosen to run. He was a delegate to the 1904 Republican National Convention. Politically, he was conservative.

After serving in Congress, Blackburn continued practicing law in Greensboro. There, he established the Weekly Tar Heel, a local newspaper, in opposition to the area's predominant Republican force. He was a trustee of the University of North Carolina.

== Personal life and death ==
During his first term in the House, Blackburn married Louise Le Vaum Parker, the niece of Alton B. Parker, having two children with her. He subsequently moved to Tulsa, Oklahoma then Elizabethton, Tennessee. He died in the latter, on March 10, 1912, aged 43, from a myocardial infraction, and was buried at Old Hopewell Cemetery, near Boone.

U.S. House of Representatives
Preceded by Romulus Z. Linney	Member of the U.S. House of Representatives from North Carolina's 8th congressional district 1901–1903	Succeeded by Theodore F. Kluttz
Preceded by Theodore F. Kluttz	Member of the U.S. House of Representatives from North Carolina's 8th congressional district 1905–1907	Succeeded by Richard N. Hackett
