= William H. Bower =

American politician

William Horton Bower (June 6, 1850 – May 11, 1910) was a lawyer and United States Representative in Congress from the state of North Carolina for one term (1893–95).

Born near Wilkesboro, North Carolina, Bower became a prominent attorney in Lenoir, North Carolina after being admitted to the bar in 1870. After four years in California, Bower returned to Lenoir in 1881. He was then elected to the North Carolina House of Representatives in 1882 and to the North Carolina State Senate in 1884. Bower was appointed as solicitor (district attorney) of the tenth judicial district of North Carolina by Governor Alfred Moore Scales in 1885–1886, serving a four-year term afterwards from 1886 to 1890.

Upon the retirement of William H. H. Cowles, Bower was elected as a Democrat to represent North Carolina's 8th congressional district in 1892, but was unsuccessful in his 1894 bid for re-election, losing to Republican Romulus Z. Linney, who was running on a Fusion ticket with the Populists.

== Notes ==
U.S. House of Representatives
Preceded by William H. H. Cowles	Member of the U.S. House of Representatives from North Carolina's 8th congressional district 1893–1895	Succeeded by Romulus Z. Linney
