= Transversal Theater Company =

Amsterdam-based experimental theater company

The Transversal Theater Company (TTC) is a nonprofit organization of American and European artists based in Amsterdam. Founded in 2003 by Bryan Reynolds, Lonnie Alcaraz, Douglas-Scott Goheen, and a number of other artists, TTC is an experimental theater company known for creating original performance works that explore charged social, cultural, conceptual, and political realities of today through the combined social-cognitive theory, performance aesthetics, and research methodology known as Transversal Poetics. The products of this praxis (combining theory and practice) or practice research (practice-as-research) approach have been various and far-reaching, including a theory of acting and design aesthetics. TTC has toured productions to festivals and other venues in the United States, Europe, the Middle East, and Asia, such as to the national theaters of Poland and Romania, Armenia's HIGH FEST, Romania's National Theatre Festival, Sibiu International Performing Arts Festival, and Interferences Festival, the Gdansk International Shakespeare Festival. TTC's core members and contributing artists have included Robert Cohen, Gary Busby, Lonnie Alcaraz, Niels Horeman, David Backovsky, Sky Reynolds, Shira Wolfe, Laila Burane, Christopher Marshall, Saskia Polderman, Luke Cantarella, Alan Terricciano, Christa Mathis, Kayla Emerson, Karyn Lawrence, Amanda McRaven, Michael Hooker, Stan Limburg, Henk Danner, Matthias Quadekker, Babette Holtmann, Mathieu van den Berk, Erik Lint, Alex Hoffman, Sam Kolodezh, Jon McKenzie, Saviana Stănescu, Gosia Lorenz, Emilia Simeonov, Vinnie Olivieri, Sammie Dasia Moore, Jacob Dovan Nguyen, Richard Brestoff, Bob Boross, Oscar Seip, Jessica Dunn, James Intriligator, Jesús López Vargas, Merle DeWitt III, Mires Peniushkevych, and Segun Adefila.

== Notable projects by Transversal Theater Company ==
- Unbuckled (play) Written by Bryan Reynolds; Directors Bryan Reynolds & Jef Vowell. The Flight Theatre, Hollywood, California, July 2004; Andrei Muresanu Theatre, Sfântu-Gheorghe, Romania, June 2004; Ariel Theatre, Târgu Mureş, Romania, June 2004; The National Theatre, Cluj, Romania, June 2004; Sibiu International Theatre Festival, Romania, May–June 2004.
- Woof, Daddy (play), Written by Bryan Reynolds. Director Amanda McRaven, Linhart Theater, New York City, August 2007. Director Amanda McRaven, Exit Theatre, San Francisco, September 2006. Director Eli Simon: Rampa-Teatr Na Targówku, Warsaw, Poland, April 2005; Teatr Polski-Malarnia, Poznan, Poland, April 2005; Teatr Kana, Szczecin, Poland, April 2005. Director Bryan Reynolds, Melkweg Theater, Amsterdam, the Netherlands, September 2008.
- Railroad (play), Written by Bryan Reynolds; Director Robert Cohen: Sibiu International Theatre Festival, Romania, May–June 2006; The National Theatre, Cluj, Romania, May 2006. Director Bryan Reynolds, Regionteatern Blekinge-Kronoberg, Växjö, Sweden, October 2013.
- Blue Shade (play), Written by Bryan Reynolds; Director Robert Cohen: Teatr Lalek, Wrocław, Poland, June 2007; Teatr Modjeska, Legnica, Poland, June 2007; Teatr 77, Łódź, Poland, May 2007; Divadlo DISK, Academy of Performing Arts (DAMU), Prague, Czech Republic, May 2007; Teatrul Mic, 17th Annual National Theatre Festival, Bucharest, Romania, November 2007. Director Bryan Reynolds, Rozentheater, Amsterdam Fringe Festival, Netherlands, September 2009; Utrecht University Theater, Netherlands, September 2009; Severins-Burg-Theater, Cologne, Germany, May 2010.
- Lumping in Fargo (musical), Book and Lyrics by Bryan Reynolds; Music by Michael Hooker. Director Christopher Marshall, Los Angeles New American Music Theatre Festival, June 2008; Teatr Rozrywki, Chorzów, Poland, July 2008; and 12th International Shakespeare Festival, Gdańsk, Poland, August 2008.
- Eve's Rapture (play), Written by Bryan Reynolds. Director Robert Cohen, Hayworth Theatre, Los Angeles, May–June 2009.
- The Green Knight (play), Book and Lyrics by Bryan Reynolds; Music by Michael Hooker. Director Bryan Reynolds, World Premiere, 17th Annual Festivalul International de Teatru de la Sibiu, Cisnădioara Fortress, Romania, June 2010.
- Macbeth, Adapted and Directed by Bryan Reynolds, Studio-T, University College Utrecht, Netherlands, September 2010.
- Romeo & Juliet, Adapted and Directed by Bryan Reynolds, Studio-T, University College Utrecht, Netherlands, September 2011.
- Titus Andronicus, Adapted and Directed by Bryan Reynolds, Studio-T, University College Utrecht, Netherlands, September 2012
- Fractalicious! (intermedial performance), Written by Bryan Reynolds; Director Guy Zimmerman; Director of Film Michael Moshe Dahan; Principal actors Bryan Reynolds & Jessica Emmanuel (originally Kayla Emerson).
  - Productions: University of Amsterdam Theater, March 2012; Studio-T, Utrecht University, September 2012; University of Amsterdam Theater, September 2012; University of California, San Diego, Dance Studio 3 Theater, October 2012; University of California, Davis, Lab A Theater, November 2012; University of California, Irvine, xMPL Theater, Contemporary Arts Center, April 2013; University of California, San Diego, Calit2 Theater, April 2013; University of California, Los Angeles, Royce Hall, May 2013; 2014 Interferences Festival, Hungarian State Theatre of Cluj, Cluj-Napoca, Romania, December 2014; Zoukak Theatre, Beirut, Lebanon, May 2015.
- Bzzap! (play), Directed by Bryan Reynolds; Written by Robert Cohen. University of Amsterdam Theater, Netherlands, August 2014.

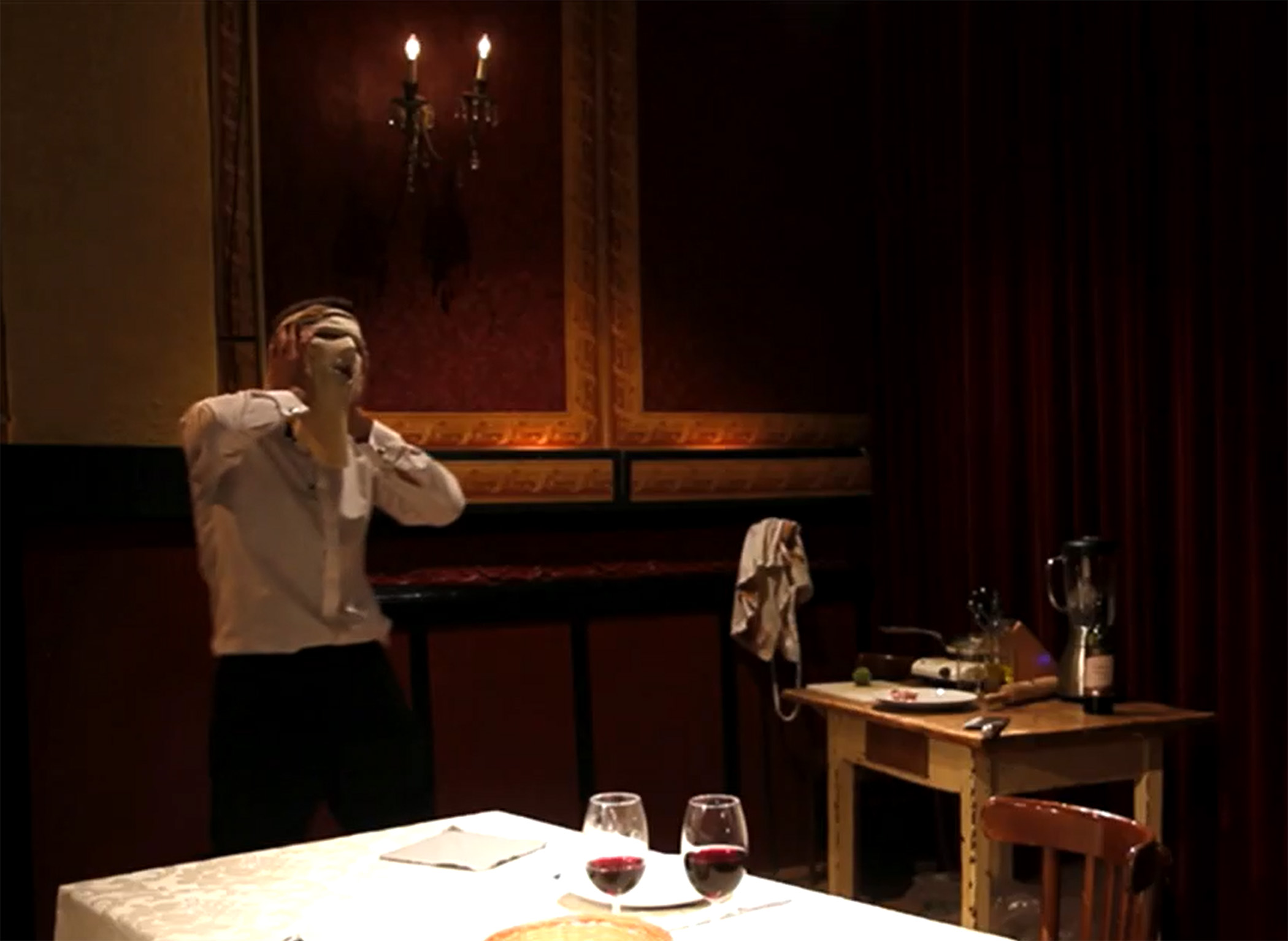
My Dinner With You

- Nabi Saleh (play), Written and Directed by Bryan Reynolds, workshop production in collaboration with the Jenin Freedom Theatre of a work-in-progress, Cinema Jenin Theatre, Palestine, March 2015.
- Railroad, (play), Written and Directed by Bryan Reynolds, a collaboration between Transversal Theater Company and the University of Nairobi, Ed Theatre, University of Nairobi, Kenya, September 2016.
- My Dinner With You (play), Written by Niels Horeman, Directed by Bryan Reynolds, Amsterdam Fringe Festival (TF2), part of Dutch and Flemish National Theater Festival (TF1), Roode Bioscoop Theater, September 2017.
- Railroad (play), Written and Directed by Bryan Reynolds, European Heritage Puzzle, Erasmus+ project, European Commission, produced in conjunction with the Adolphe Saxophone International Competition, Citadelle de Dinant, Belgium, November 2019.
- Railroad (play), Written and Directed by Bryan Reynolds, 28th Annual Festival Internazionale del Teatro Patologico, Rome, Italy, May 2020 (produced as part of European Heritage Puzzle, Erasmus+ Project); winner of the Tor Vergata Award.
- No Erasure (dance theater/play), Co-Directed & Co-Written with Jesús E. López Vargas, a collaboration between Transversal Theater and Dawar Arts, Jesuit Theater, Cairo, Egypt, April 2021.
- Curie, Curie (dance theater/play), Written and Directed by Bryan Reynolds, Choreography by Jessica Dunn, University of California, Irvine, xMPL Theater, Contemporary Arts Center, October 2021; Teatr STUDIO, Palace of Culture, Warsaw, Poland, January 2022.
- Interview the Dead (performance art/theater), Created and Directed by Bryan Reynolds, Apartment Theater, Commodore Building, Leon Street, Hamra and at the American University of Beirut, Beirut, Lebanon, December 2021; Eugène Millon Theatre, Paris, France, July 2022); Mezrab Theater, Amsterdam, Netherlands, September 2022; Amsterdam University of the Arts, Academy of Theater and Dance, IDlab Theater September 2023.
- Anatomy of a Home (theater), Directed by Bryan Reynolds, Written by Raffi Feghali, Theater Bellevue, Amsterdam Fringe Festival, Amsterdam, Netherlands, September 2022; Theater Podium Mozaïek, International Storytelling Festival Amsterdam, Netherlands, November 2022; Little Theater, UC Irvine, January 2023; Thiemeloods Theater, Nijmegen, Netherlands, March 2023; Neufeld Auditorium, LCC International University, Klaipėda, Lithuania, March 2023; Tumanyan International Storytelling Festival, Factory Building Theater, Yerevan, Armenia, August 2023; Amsterdam University of the Arts, Academy of Theater and Dance, IDlab September 2023; Theater Bellevue, Amsterdam, Netherlands, December 2023; Rederij Lampedusa, Amsterdam, Netherlands, 2024; Fortellerfestivalen, Nordic Black Theatre, Oslo, Norway, April 2025.
- After Images, or Marie Curie Remembers (dance theater/play), Written and Directed by Bryan Reynolds, Choreography by Jessica Dunn, Théâtre de Sax du Centre Culturel de Dinant, Dinant, Belgium, September 2022; University Theater, University of Amsterdam, Netherlands, September 2022.
- The Passage (dance theater/play), Written and Directed by Bryan Reynolds, Choreography by Jessica Dunn, University of California, Irvine, xMPL Theater, Contemporary Arts Center, October 2022.
- LifeLines (dance theater/play), written by Jon McKenzie, Bryan Reynolds & Saviana Stănescu, Directed by Bryan Reynolds, Glicker-Milstein Theatre, Diana Center, Barnard College, NYC, New York, January 2024; xMPL Theater, Contemporary Arts Center, University of California, Irvine, March 2024; Divadlo Konvikt, Palacký University Olomouc, Czech Republic, October 2025; Teatr Bez Rzędów, Krakow, Poland, October 2025; Marta Studio Theater, Janáček Academy of Music and Performing Arts, Brno, Czech Republic, October 2025; xMPL Theater, Contemporary Arts Center, University of California, Irvine, February 2026; Toplocentrala, Sofia, Bulgaria, October 2026; The Crossroads International Theatre Festival, Niš, Serbia, October 2026; Montenegrin Royal Theater Zetski Dom, Cetinje Montenegro, October 2026.
- Eve’s Rapture, co-production with The Crown Troupe of Africa, written by Bryan Reynolds, Directed by Segun Adefila, Lagos International Theater Festival, Muson Centre Theatre, Lagos, Nigeria, November 2025; Glover Memorial Hall Theater, Lagos, Nigeria, December 2025.
- Railroad, co-production with TTC, written by Bryan Reynolds, Directed by Mires Peniushkevych, Kyivska Mala Opera House, Kyiv, Ukraine, March 2026; Ivan Franko National University of Lviv, University Theater, Lviv, Ukraine, November 2026; Vasyl Stefanyk Carpathian National University, University Theater, Ivano-Frankivsk, Ukraine, November 2026.

== Transversal Acting ==
Transversal acting is a unique acting technique that emerged during the Transversal Theater Company's initial attempts to combine theory and practice, and continues to develop through ongoing Transversal Acting Workshops that have been taught in North America, Europe, the Middle East, and Asia. It takes as its premise that vulnerabilities, surrenders, and slippages can be more productive than control, domination, and regulation. Actors, sets, props, narratives, objects, histories, media, things, ideas, and experiences all form an interrelational dynamism. Instead of privileging experiences, identities, or narratives as the driving forces of performance and interpretation, transversal acting privileges intensity, contact, and creation.
