= Joseph Pearson Caldwell =

American politician and lawyer (1808–1853)

Member of the U.S. House of Representatives from North Carolina's 2nd district
- In office March 4, 1849 – March 3, 1853
- Preceded by: Nathaniel Boyden
- Succeeded by: Thomas Hart Ruffin

Member of the North Carolina House of Representatives from the Iredell County district
- In office 1838–1844

Member of the North Carolina Senate from the Iredell County district
- In office 1833–1834

Personal details
- Born: March 5, 1808 Olin, North Carolina, US
- Died: June 30, 1853 (aged 45) Statesville, North Carolina, US
- Party: Whig
- Relations: David Franklin Caldwell (brother); William Sharpe (grandfather); Theodore F. Kluttz (son-in-law)
- Occupation: Politician, lawyer

Joseph Pearson Caldwell (March 5, 1808 – June 30, 1853) was an American politician and lawyer. A Whig, he was a member of the United States House of Representatives from North Carolina.

== Biography ==
Caldwell was born on March 5, 1808, near Olin, North Carolina, the fifth son born to Andrew Caldwell and Ruth Reese Sharpe Caldwell. His eldest brother was judge David Franklin Caldwell. Through his mother, his grandfather was politician William Sharpe. He studied at Bethany Academy, near Statesville. He then read law under his brother David, being admitted to the bar and practicing law in Statesville. He owned slaves.

Caldwell was a Whig. In 1833 and 1834, he represented Iredell County in the North Carolina Senate, and from 1838 to 1844, represented the county in the North Carolina House of Representatives. While in the House, he was a member of the Committee on Propositions and Grievances. In 1840, he introduced a bill to consolidate part of Iredell County into Wilkes County. Also in 1840, he introduced amendments to the bill introducing common schools to the state. He was a member of the United States House of Representatives, from March 4, 1849, to March 3, 1853, representing North Carolina's 2nd district. He was not nominated to the following election. Politically, he was liberal.

In 1842, Caldwell married Amanda McCulloch, a descendent of military officer Thomas Polk. His son, Joseph Jr., became a newspaperman, and his daughter, Sallie, married politician Theodore F. Kluttz. He died on June 30, 1853, aged 45, in Statesville, and was buried at the Old Statesville Cemetery.

U.S. House of Representatives
Preceded by Nathaniel Boyden	Member of the U.S. House of Representatives from North Carolina's 2nd congressional district 1849–1853	Succeeded by Thomas H. Ruffin
