= Richard N. Hackett =

American politician

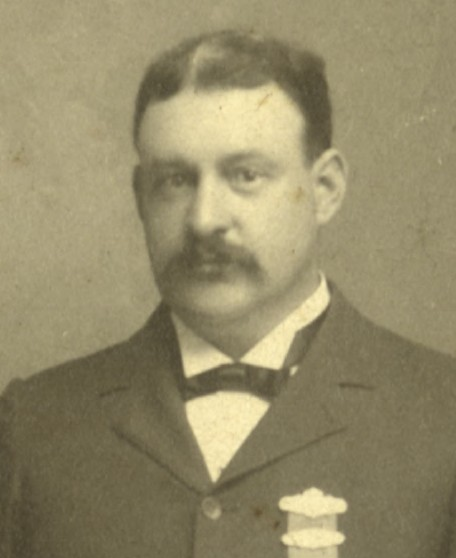
Hackett c. 1900-1901

Richard Nathaniel Hackett (December 4, 1866 – November 22, 1923) was a United States representative in Congress from North Carolina from 1907 through 1909.

Born in Wilkesboro, Wilkes County, North Carolina on December 4, 1866, Hackett graduated from the University of North Carolina at Chapel Hill and became a lawyer.

Hackett chaired the Wilkes County Democratic Party organization for many years, and served as mayor of Wilkesboro. He was unsuccessful in a run for the U.S. Congress in 1896, but won a seat ten years later representing North Carolina's 8th congressional district in the 60th United States Congress (defeating incumbent Republican E. Spencer Blackburn). In 1908, Hackett was defeated for re-election by Charles Holden Cowles, and he returned to practicing law. Hackett died in Statesville, Iredell County, NC, on November 22, 1923.

U.S. House of Representatives
Preceded by E. Spencer Blackburn	Member of the U.S. House of Representatives from North Carolina's 8th congressional district 1907–1909	Succeeded by Charles H. Cowles
