= Gdańsk Shakespeare Theatre =

- Gdański Teatr Szekspirowski
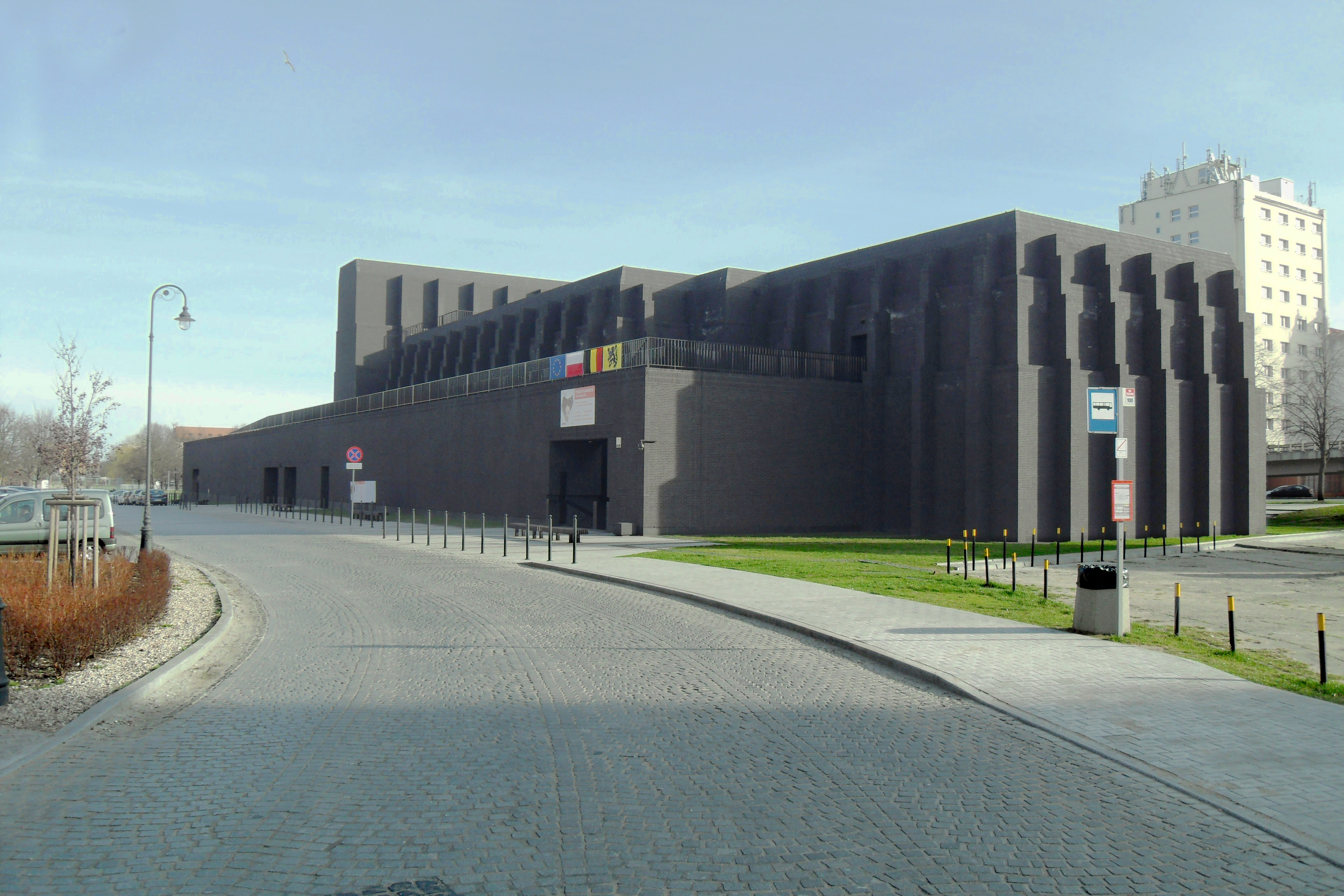
- The theatre from the northwest, with the fly tower left of the main block
- Interactive map of the Gdańsk Shakespeare Theatre area

General information
- Type: Dramatic theatre
- Location: Gdańsk, ul. Wojciecha Bogusławskiego 1, 80-818, Poland
- Coordinates: 54°20′53.52″N 18°39′11.52″E
- Opened: February 20, 2008; 18 years ago

Design and construction
- Architect: Renato Rizzi

Other information
- Seating capacity: 600

The Gdańsk Shakespeare Theatre (Polish: Gdański Teatr Szekspirowski) is a Shakespearean theatre in Gdańsk, Poland. It is built on the site of a 17th-century theatre, known as the Fencing School, where English travelling players performed works of English Renaissance theatre. The leading figure in the project to construct the new theatre is Jerzy Limon, a founder of the Gdańsk Shakespeare Festival.

It was built by architect Renato Rizzi in the light of Limon's research which suggests that the Fencing School was modelled on the Fortune Playhouse in London. Though not an attempt at an exact reproduction, the new theatre combines elements from the design of these earlier theatres with modern technology. It opened in September 2014.

== History ==
Gdańsk was one of the most important destinations for English travelling players in the first half of the 17th century. Their first documented visit was in 1601. Typically they would perform at the courts of Königsberg and Warsaw during winter, and in Gdańsk or Elbląg in the summer. Performances in Gdańsk took place during St. Dominic's Fair, in August.

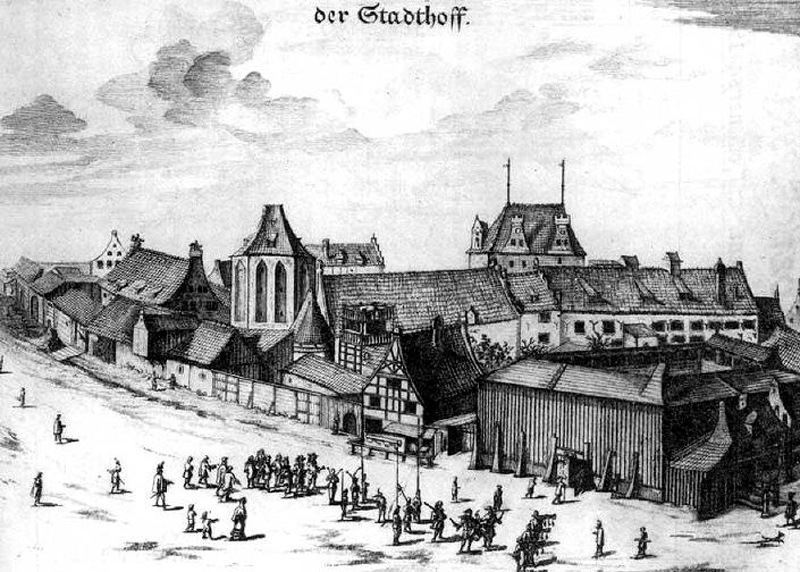
The Fencing School (shown on the right), engraving by Peter Willer published in 1687

Gdańsk's first public playhouse was built during this period. Known as the Fencing School (Fechtschule), it hosted a variety of other entertainments and activities besides the theatrical. After comparing an engraving by Dutch artist Peter Willer published in 1687 to the dimensions given in the builder's contract of 1600 for the Fortune Playhouse in London, Jerzy Limon concluded that the Fencing School was built c. 1611 and modelled after the Fortune. He found support for this from archaeological excavations carried out by Marcin Gawlicki on the Gdańsk site in 1997–2000 and 2004. These suggested a plan of 22.4 m (73 ft) by 19.6 m (64 ft), slightly smaller and less square than the Fortune, which measured 24 m (79 ft) by 24 m (79 ft). A 1739 ground plan of the area discovered by Jerzy Michalak was published in 1998, which showed the Fencing School with a square plan.

The excavations found remnants of timber posts dating from the 1630s, which according to Limon were the result of a documented renovation of the theatre in 1635. Michalak has suggested that the excavated building was actually Gdańsk's second Fencing School, built in 1635, and that there was an earlier Fencing School, also a theatre, built in 1603 but on a different site.

The Fencing School was replaced in the 1740s on the same site, or adjacent to it, by a new municipal theatre known as the Comedy House (Comoedienhaus). This was then demolished in the early 19th century, and the site used for housing. The city's Great Synagogue subsequently stood there until it was demolished by the Nazis in 1939. The site was later used as a car park.

The Theatrum Gedanense Foundation was founded in 1991, with Charles, Prince of Wales as its patron. In 1993 it established Shakespeare Week, which in 1997 became the Gdańsk Shakespeare Festival. The annual event accompanies Gdańsk's St. Dominic's Fair. In 2004 the Foundation initiated an architectural competition for the new theatre, won in January 2005 by Italian architect Renato Rizzi. Construction became possible when European Union funds were offered in 2007. In September 2009 the groundbreaking ceremony was attended by Polish Prime Minister Donald Tusk. Construction started on 5 March 2011. The theatre was completed at a cost of 95 million zlotys (£18 million), of which 75% was funded by the European Union, with other funds coming from local government.

Donald Tusk also attended the theatre's opening on 19 September 2014. It was followed by British Week featuring British touring companies, starting with a Shakespeare's Globe production of Hamlet. For 2014 only, the start of the Shakespeare Festival was moved from August to 27 September, to follow the theatre's opening week. The Shakespeare Festival, British Week and Flemish Week will each recur annually in the theatre's program.

On July 18, 2017, the theatre was visited by Prince William, Duke of Cambridge and Catherine, Duchess of Cambridge as part of their royal trip to Poland and Germany where they met the theatre's director Jerzy Limon and saw a short play.

== Architecture ==
The building is of anthracite-black brick, massively buttressed and with few apertures, thereby expressing itself as a Black Box. A thick wall in the same material runs around the building, creating courtyards of various sizes, except to the west where the building projects beyond it. There is public access to internal walkways within the wall and external ones along its top. The main entrance, at the western end of the northern side, leads into the lobby and the theatre space, with the stage at the eastern end of the auditorium, surmounted by a fly tower. To the east of the tower is a lower block containing backstage areas, dressing rooms, accommodation and offices.

The main block's brick shell houses a wooden playhouse structure. Though taking account of the discoveries regarding the earlier theatre, and similarly having three storeys of galleries, the playhouse is not an exact reproduction. Full use is made of modern technology in the retractable roof, which can open or close in three minutes, and a system of 56 lifts, which enables a variety of theatrical configurations, including thrust stage, proscenium stage and theatre in the round. The two opening wings of the retractable roof each weigh 46 tonnes (51 tons). Seating capacity is up to 600.
