= Alonzo C. Shuford =

American politician and farmer (1858–1933)

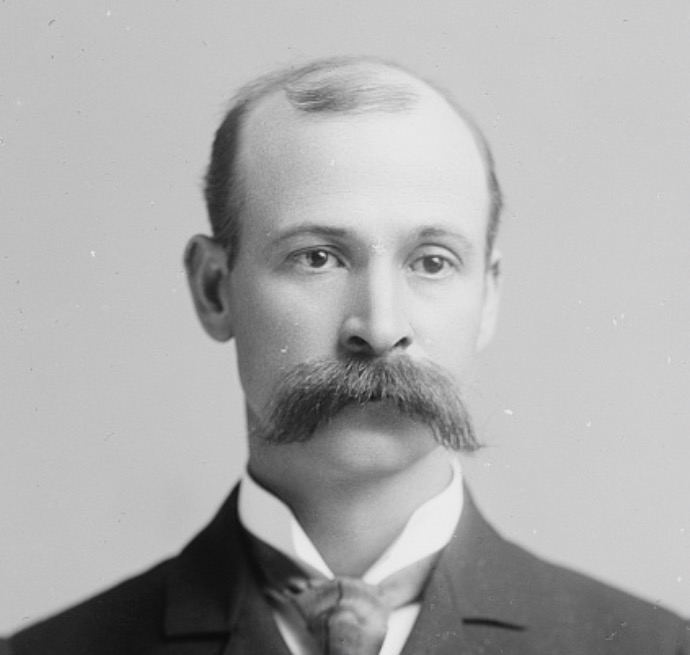
- Portrait of Shuford by Charles Milton Bell, taken between February 1894 and February 1901

Member of the U.S. House of Representatives from North Carolina's 7th district
- In office March 4, 1895 – March 3, 1899
- Preceded by: John S. Henderson
- Succeeded by: Theodore F. Kluttz

Personal details
- Born: Alonzo Craig Shuford; March 1, 1858 Newton, North Carolina, US
- Died: February 8, 1933 (aged 74) Chapel Hill, North Carolina, US
- Party: Populist
- Occupation: Politician, farmer

Alonzo Craig Shuford (March 1, 1858 – February 8, 1933) was an American politician and farmer. A member of the Populist Party, he was a member of the United States House of Representatives from North Carolina.

== Biography ==
Shuford was born on March 1, 1858, on a farm near Newton, North Carolina, the son of George Philip Shuford and Eliza Baker Shuford. He was of German ancestry. Educated at common schools, he studied at Catawba College. He worked as a cattle farmer and co-owned the Startown Nursery Company, a fruit company.

In 1889, Shuford joined the Farmers' Alliance, acting as a local lecturer of the movement. In February 1892, he was a delegate to the labor conference in St. Louis, and in July of the same year, was a delegate to the Populist convention in Omaha, Nebraska. In 1894, he was elected vice president of the State Alliance. From 1905 to 1925, he was an organizer of the National Farmers Union.

Shuford was a member of the Populist Party, though The Political Graveyard states he was a Republican. He unsuccessfully ran for United States House of Representatives in 1892. He was a member of the House from March 4, 1895, to March 3, 1899, representing North Carolina's 7th district. While serving, he was a member of the Committees on Agriculture and on Education and Workforce. He was not nominated for the following election. He was a Presidential elector in the 1924 election, as which he voted for Robert M. La Follette and Burton K. Wheeler. Politically, he was liberal. He supported Governor Charles Aurelius Smith.

After serving in Congress, Shuford returned to farming near Newton. He retired in 1928. On November 21, 1882, he married Ellen Lowe, with whom he had seven children. He died there on February 8, 1933, aged 74, and was buried at Chapel Hill Cemetery.

U.S. House of Representatives
Preceded by John S. Henderson	Member of the U.S. House of Representatives from North Carolina's 7th congressional district 1895–1899	Succeeded by Theodore F. Kluttz
