= Thomas Hart Ruffin =

American politician (1820–1863)

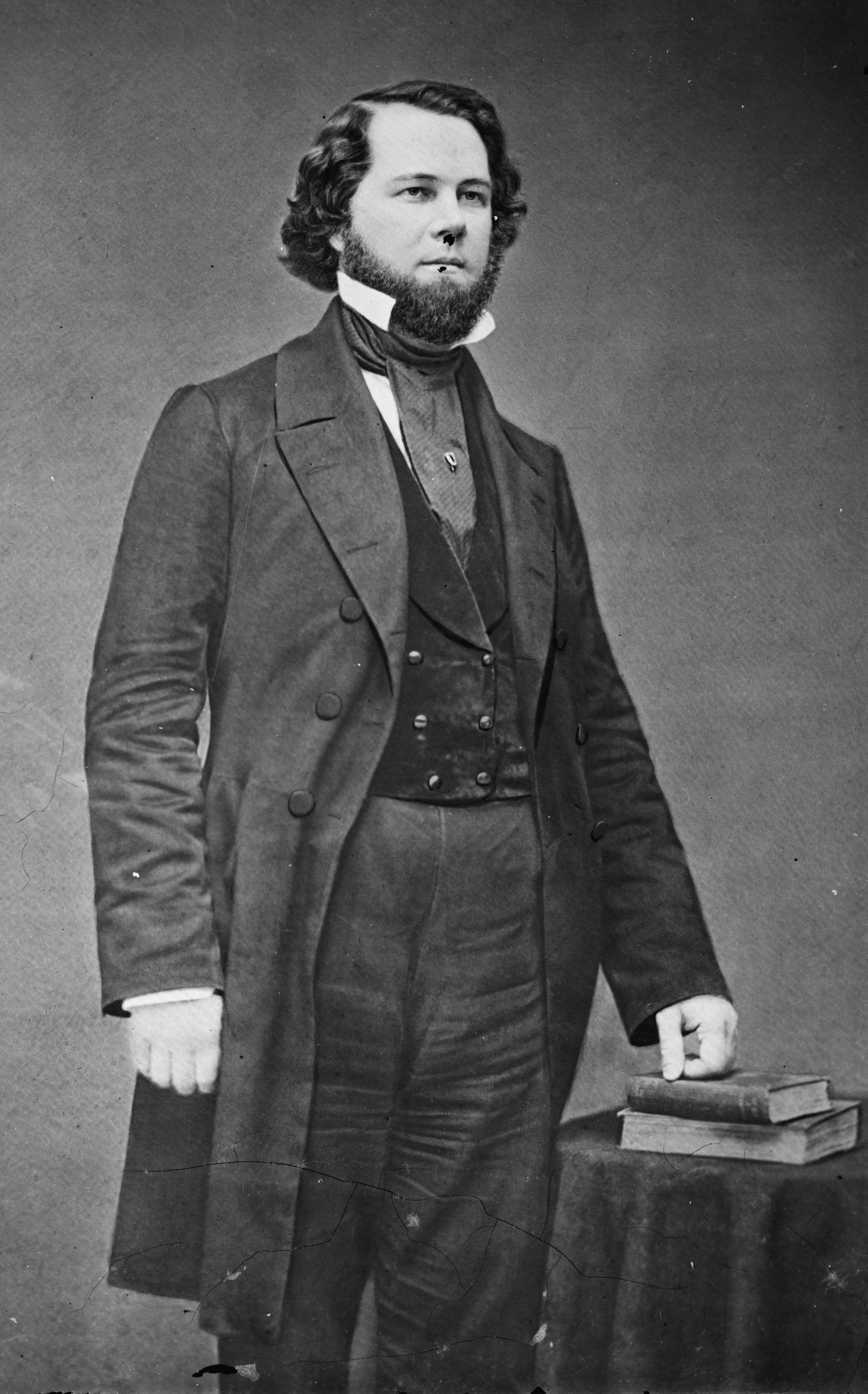
- Brady-Handy collection portrait of Ruffin, taken between 1855 and 1865

Member of the U.S. House of Representatives from North Carolina's 2nd district
- In office March 4, 1853 – March 3, 1861
- Preceded by: Joseph Pearson Caldwell
- Succeeded by: David Heaton

Delegate to the Provisional Congress of the Confederate States from North Carolina
- In office June 18 – July 25, 1861
- Preceded by: Position established
- Succeeded by: Position abolished

Personal details
- Born: September 9, 1820 Louisburg, North Carolina, US
- Died: October 13, 1863 (aged 43) Alexandria, Virginia, US
- Relations: Thomas Ruffin (cousin); Josiah Ogden Watson (uncle-in-law); Edmund Ruffin (cousin); Charles R. Thomas; Charles R. Thomas
- Occupation: Politician, lawyer, military officer

Military service
- Allegiance: United States (until 1861); Confederate States of America (1861–1863)
- Branch/service: Confederate States Army
- Unit: 1st North Carolina Cavalry Regiment
- Battles/wars: Mexican–American War; American Civil War; Battle of Savage's Station; Battle of Gettysburg; Battle of Bristoe Station

Thomas Hart Ruffin (September 9, 1820 – October 13, 1863) was an American politician, lawyer, and military officer. A Democrat, he was a member of the United States House of Representatives from North Carolina, and later a delegate to the Provisional Congress of the Confederate States. He died fighting in the American Civil War.

== Early life and education ==
Ruffin was born on September 9, 1820, in Louisburg, North Carolina, the son of Henry John Gray Ruffin and Mary (née Polly) Tartt Ruffin. He was a distant cousin of judge Thomas Ruffin (The Philadelphia Inquirer erroneously claims Thomas was his father), and was thereby related to politicians Charles R. Thomas and Charles R. Thomas Jr. He was also a second cousin of Edmund Ruffin.

Educated at common schools, Ruffin received a Bachelor of Arts from the University of North Carolina School of Law in 1841; he was awarded a Master of Arts in 1846. He read law under George Edmund Badger then began practicing law in Goldsboro. He never married.

== Career ==
Ruffin later moved to the Ozarks of Missouri. From 1844 to 1848, he was the attorney of Missouri's 7th Circuit Court. During the Mexican–American War, he served as a first lieutenant in a Missouri regiment during the Texan Santa Fe Expedition. He returned to Goldsboro in 1850, and in 1852, inherited a large Johnston County plantation and 51 slaves from his uncle-in-law, Josiah Ogden Watson.

Ruffin was a Democrat. He was a member of the United States House of Representatives from March 4, 1853, to March 3, 1861, representing North Carolina's 2nd district. He resigned following Southern secession. From June 18 to July 25, 1861, he was a delegate to the Provisional Congress of the Confederate States from North Carolina. Politically, he was liberal. He supported secession on the basis of states' rights.

== Military service and death ==
Ruffin graduated from the United States Military Academy. During the American Civil War, he declined the rank of colonel and became a captain of the 1st North Carolina Cavalry Regiment of the Confederate States Army. During the Battle of Savage's Station, he was captured by the Union army in Virginia, being held at Fort Warren until a prisoner exchange on August 5. He was cut in the head by a sabre during the Battle of Gettysburg. He was promoted to major and to lieutenant colonel, on June 29, 1863, and July 23, 1863, respectively.

During the Battle of Bristoe Station, Ruffin fell off his horse and took a Minié ball to the forehead. He died on October 13, 1863, aged 43, in Alexandria, Virginia. His body was held in a burial vault and maintained until a burial could be done. He was buried at a private cemetery near Louisburg.

U.S. House of Representatives
Preceded by Joseph Pearson Caldwell	Representative of North Carolina's 2nd congressional district 1853–1861	Succeeded by David Heaton after Civil War
Preceded by none	Representative to the Provisional Confederate Congress from North Carolina; 1861	Succeeded by none
