= Theodore F. Kluttz =

American politician and lawyer (1848–1918)

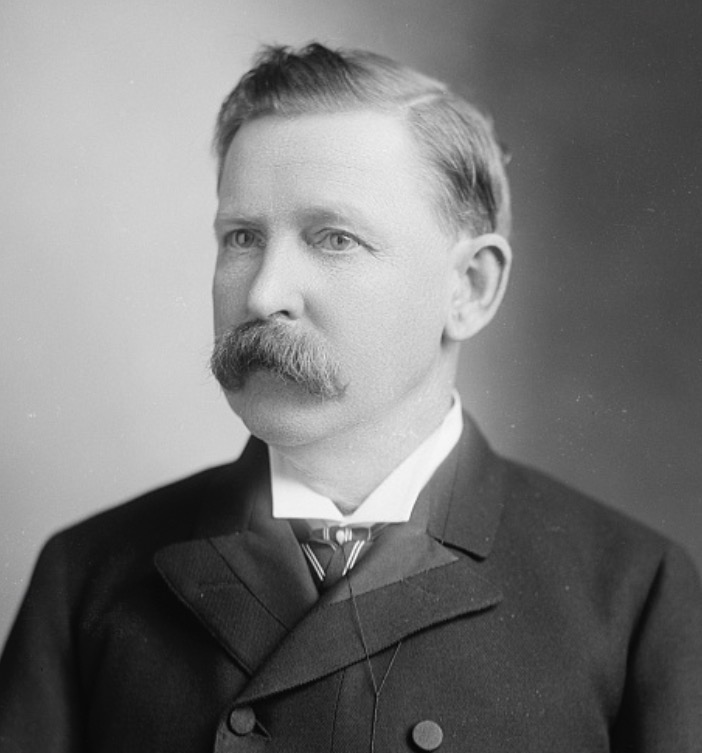
- Portrait of Klutzz by Charles Milton Bell, taken between February 1894 and February 1901

Member of the U.S. House of Representatives from North Carolina
- In office March 4, 1899 – March 3, 1905
- Preceded by: Alonzo C. Shuford (7th); E. Spencer Blackburn (8th)
- Succeeded by: Robert N. Page (7th); E. Spencer Blackburn (8th)
- Constituency: 7th district (1899–1903); 8th district (1903–1905)

Personal details
- Born: Theodore Franklin Kluttz; October 4, 1848 Salisbury, North Carolina, US
- Died: November 18, 1918 (aged 70)
- Party: Democratic
- Relations: Joseph Caldwell (brother-in-law); Joseph Pearson Caldwell (father-in-law)
- Occupation: Politician, lawyer

Theodore Franklin Kluttz (October 4, 1848 – November 18, 1918) was an American politician and lawyer. A Democrat, he was a member of the United States House of Representatives from North Carolina.

Born in Salisbury, North Carolina, Kluttz was orphaned at a young age and became self-sustaining. He worked as a pharmacist and later a lawyer. He served in the House from 1899 to 1905. Politically, he was liberal.

== Early life ==
Kluttz was born on October 4, 1848, in Salisbury, North Carolina, the son of farmer and sheriff Caleb Kluttz and Elizabeth Moose Kluttz. He was orphaned as a child and educated at common schools. At age sixteen, he became a clerk for a drugstore, becoming a partial owner four or five years later.

== Career ==
In 1880, Kluttz read law under James M. McCorkle, being admitted to the bar in 1881, after which he commenced practice in Salisbury. From 1884 until his resignation in 1886, he was judge of the Rowan County interior court.

As a businessman, Kluttz was vice-president of the Yadkin Valley Railroad and was director of the North Carolina Railroad. He was president of Chestnut Hill Cemetery Association, Davis and Wiley Bank, the Rowan Knitting Company, the Salisbury Building and Loan Association, the Salisbury Chamber of Commerce. He was director of the North Carolina Steel and Iron Company, Salisbury Cotton Mills, and the Salisbury Water Works.

Kluttz was a Democrat. He was a Presidential elector in the 1880 and 1896 elections, as which he voted for Winfield Scott Hancock and William Hayden English, and for William Jennings Bryan, respectively. He was a delegate to the 1896 Democratic National Convention.

Kluttz was a member of the United States House of Representatives from March 4, 1899, to March 3, 1905. He representing North Carolina's 7th district from 1899 to 1903, then its 8th district from 1903 to 1905. In his first Congressional election, he won with the largest plurality in North Carolina Congressional history. He refused to run in the following election. Politically, he was liberal, though was relatively conservative compared to his partymen.

After serving in Congress, Kluttz practiced law in Salisbury. From 1912 to 1914, he served as a Rowan County judge.

== Personal life and death ==
In 1873, Kluttz married Sallie C. Caldwell, the daughter of Joseph Pearson Caldwell and sister of Joseph Caldwell; they had six children together, including Whitehead Kluttz. He was Presbyterian, as well as a member of the Improved Order of Heptasophs, the Independent Order of Odd Fellows, the Junior Order of United American Mechanics, and the Knights of Pythias. He died on November 18, 1918, aged 70, in Salisbury, from an illness which paralyzed him for the last days of his life. He was buried at Chestnut Hill Cemetery, in Salisbury.

U.S. House of Representatives
| Preceded by Alonzo C. Shuford | Member of the U.S. House of Representatives from North Carolina's 7th congressional district 1899–1903 | Succeeded by Robert N. Page |
| Preceded by E. Spencer Blackburn | Member of the U.S. House of Representatives from North Carolina's 8th congressional district 1903–1905 | Succeeded by E. Spencer Blackburn |
