= William H. H. Cowles =

American politician

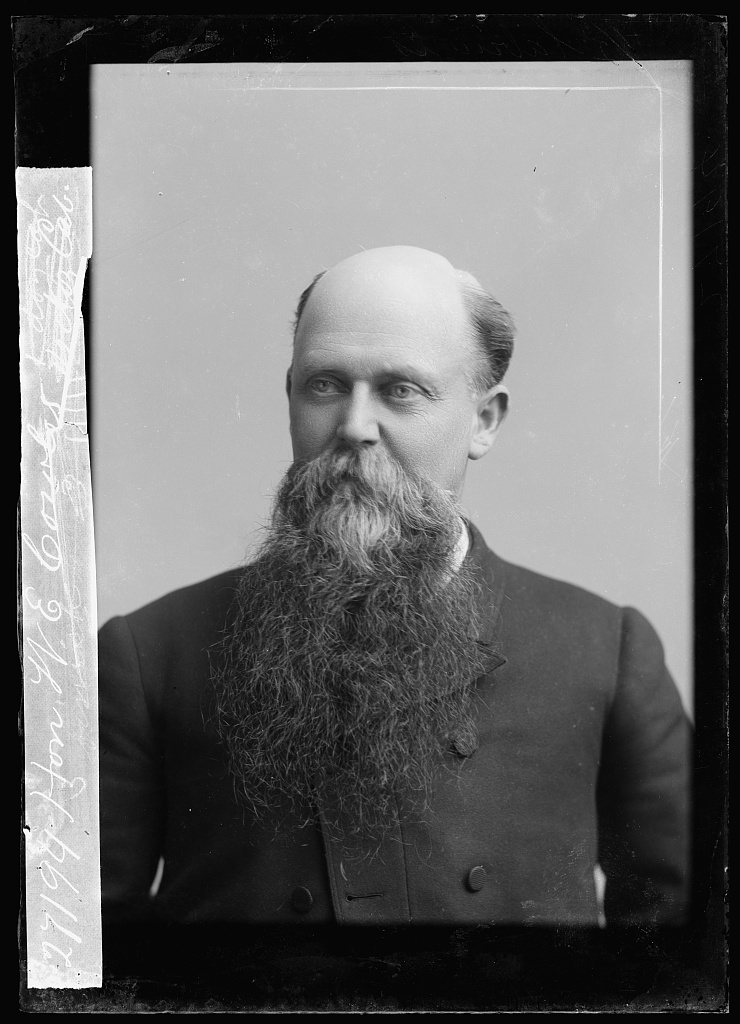
Cowles, Photographed by C. M. Bell

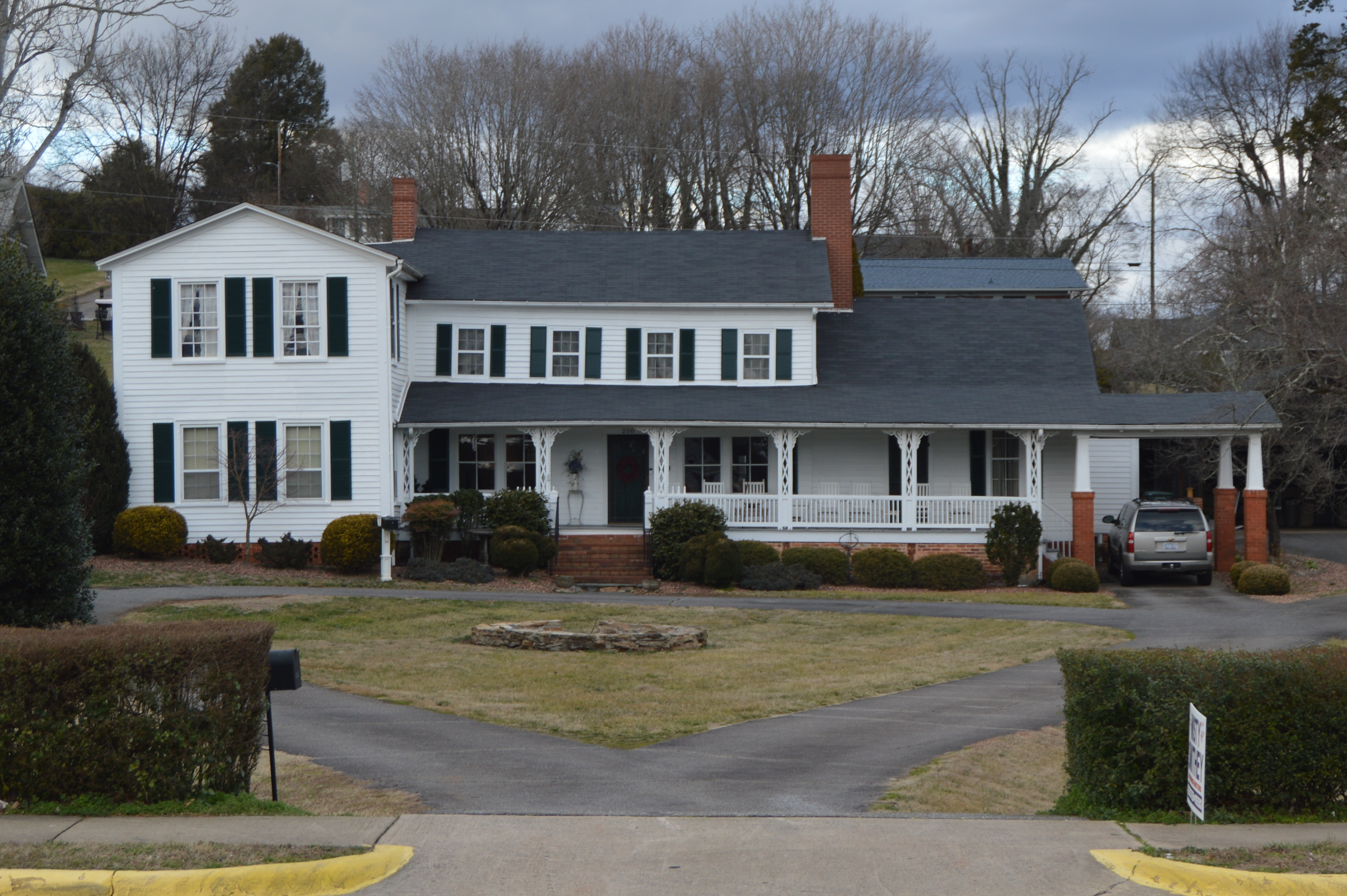
Cowles' house at Wilkesboro

William Henry Harrison Cowles (April 22, 1840 – December 30, 1901) was a North Carolina Democratic politician who served four terms in the United States House of Representatives.

== Biography ==
A native of Yadkin County, North Carolina, Cowles served in the Confederate States Army during the American Civil War. In 1861 he enlisted in the 1st North Carolina Cavalry Regiment and by the war's end had risen to the rank of lieutenant colonel. He fought under Jeb Stuart and led Stuart's rear guard when crossing the last river back to Confederate territory ending Stuart's "ride around McClellan". Upon Stuart's death in 1864, General Wade Hampton took command and Cowles was with Hampton until capture at Petersburg at the war's end. He was wounded twice during the war.

After the war, he attended Richmond Hill Law School and moved to Wilkesboro and practiced law. From 1874 through 1878, Cowles served as the elected solicitor (district attorney) for the state's 10th judicial district. In 1884, he was elected as a Democrat to the 49th United States Congress, and was re-elected for three additional terms. He did not run for a fifth term. While in Congress, Cowles chaired the Committee on Expenditures in the Department of Justice (Fiftieth Congress) and the Committee on Mines and Mining (Fifty-second Congress).

He was the uncle of Republican Congressman Charles H. Cowles, and he was the grandfather of Democratic N.C. state Senator Lura S. Tally.

His home and law office at Wilkesboro was listed on the National Register of Historic Places in 1982.

U.S. House of Representatives
Preceded by Robert B. Vance	Member of the U.S. House of Representatives from North Carolina's 8th congressional district 1885–1893	Succeeded by William H. Bower
