= Romulus Linney (playwright) =

American dramatist (1930–2011)

- Born: Romulus Zachariah Linney IV; September 21, 1930; Philadelphia, Pennsylvania, U.S.
- Died: January 15, 2011 (aged 80); Germantown, New York, U.S.
- Education: Oberlin College (BA); Yale University (MFA)
- Occupations: Dramatist; librettist; playwright; professor
- Spouses: Ann Leggett Perse (m. 1963; div. 1966); Margaret Andrews (m. 1967; div. 1994); Laura Callanan (m. 1996)
- Children: 2, including Laura Linney
- Relatives: Romulus Zachariah Linney (great-grandfather)

Romulus Zachariah Linney IV (September 21, 1930 – January 15, 2011) was an American playwright and novelist.

== Life and career ==
Linney was born in Philadelphia, the son of Maitland (née Thompson) Linney and physician Romulus Zachariah Linney III. His great-grandfather was Romulus Zachariah Linney, a North Carolinian who served the Confederate States of America in the American Civil War and was a U.S. Congressman. Linney grew up in the town of Madison, Tennessee, where his father was an M.D. He also lived with his extended family for a few years during the Great Depression in the Linney–Coffey homestead in Boone, North Carolina, and returned to the homestead to visit his favorite cousins, the Coffeys, throughout his life. Linney recalled that his mother "was a very good amateur actress" and when she starred in the Nashville Community Theatre's 1940 production of Our Town as Mrs. Gibbs, he was deeply moved by her performance, particularly by her character's death. "I became really connected to my mother and it was the first time I was really shattered by a play. And in many ways that was the beginning. It, in a very visceral way, showed me the profound impact theater can have... Music might give you exultation or something else equally profound, but theater at a great stroke can just shatter you, can break you." Linney's father died of throat cancer when Linney was 13 years old. Linney said about his father's death, "I've never gotten over it. My father was a very good man...I think his death is in everything I do. All other experiences in life pall beside the death of a parent you dearly love, when you have to deal with that as a child. No religion can console you for it. Nothing can." After his father's death, Linney and his mother moved to Washington, D.C., where he attended middle school and high school.

He earned a Bachelor of Arts degree from Oberlin College and a Master of Fine Arts degree from the Yale School of Drama. He was an alumnus of HB Studio in New York City. He authored three novels, four opera librettos, twenty short stories, and 85 plays which have been staged throughout the United States from South Coast Repertory in California to the Virginia Museum Theater (VMT) in Richmond, and in Europe and Asia. His plays include The Sorrows of Frederick, Holy Ghosts, Childe Byron, Heathen Valley, and an adaptation of Ernest J. Gaines's novel, A Lesson Before Dying, which has been produced in New York and in numerous regional theaters. Many of his plays were set in Appalachia (Tennessee, Holy Ghosts, Sand Mountain, Gint and Heathen Valley), while others focused on historical subjects (The Sorrows of Frederick, King Philip, 2: Goering at Nuremberg). His adaptations for the American stage of several modern foreign classics—plays and tales from Tolstoy, Chekhov, Ibsen and others—have been performed from New York to Minneapolis, and his melding of two novels by Henry Adams into the comedy Democracy was premiered by artistic director Keith Fowler at VMT. Linney's vivid biographical reconstructions of controversial personalities are remarkable for their power to retain a lifelike vigor—as in his treatment of Hermann Goering in 2: Goering at Nuremberg, and Lord Byron in Childe Byron.

In 2010 before his death, Linney completed a libretto for an opera by Scott Wheeler based on his first play The Sorrows of Frederick commissioned by The Metropolitan Opera and Lincoln Center Theater. He also completed a full-length play about Alzheimer's disease, Over Martinis, Driving Somewhere, which received a workshop at New York Stage and Film in the summer of 2010.

Among Linney's many awards were two Obie awards, one for sustained excellence in play writing; two National Critics Awards; three Drama-Logue Awards; and fellowships from the Guggenheim and Rockefeller foundations, the New York Foundation for the Arts and the National Endowment of the Arts. He was a member of the American Academy of Arts and Letters, which conferred upon him its Award in Literature, Award of Merit and its highest award, the gold medal. He received honorary doctorates from Oberlin College in 1994, from Appalachian State University in 1995, and from Wake Forest University in 1998.

He was a member of the Ensemble Studio Theatre, the Fellowship of Southern Writers, National Theatre Conference, College of Fellows of the American Theatre, American Academy of Arts and Sciences, the American Academy of Arts and Letters, and the Corporation of Yaddo. Linney had been chair of the MFA Playwriting program at Columbia University’s School of the Arts and Professor of Playwriting in the Actors Studio MFA Program at The New School in New York. He also taught over the years at Princeton, University of Pennsylvania, Connecticut College, and the Sewanee Writers Conference among others.

Linney was the founding playwright of Signature Theatre Company, which named a theater in his honor in the new Signature Center, which opened in 2012. On his birthday September 21, 2012, the University of North Carolina at its Appalachian State University campus in Boone, NC opened his archives for researchers and scholars.

== Death ==
Linney died from lung cancer at his home in Germantown, New York on January 15, 2011.

== Family ==
He was the father of two daughters, Laura and Susan Linney, from different marriages.

At the time of death, he was married to Laura Callanan, former senior deputy chair of the National Endowment for the Arts and founding partner of Upstart Co-Lab.

== Bibliography ==
=== Plays ===
The plays of Romulus Linney include:

- 2: Goering at Nuremberg
- Akhmatova
- Ambrosio
- Appalachia Sounding
- April Snow
- Ave Maria
- Can Can
- The Captivity of Pixie Shedman
- Childe Byron
- Choir Practice
- A Christmas Carol
- Clair de Lune
- The Death of King Philip
- Democracy
- Democracy and Esther
- El Hermano
- F.M.
- Gardens of Eden
- Gint
- Gold and Silver Waltz
- Goodbye Oscar
- Goodbye, Howard
- Heathen Valley
- Holy Ghosts
- Hrosvitha
- Juliet
- Just Folks
- Klonsky and Schwartz
- Komachi
- Lark
- Laughing Stock
- A Lesson Before Dying
- Love Drunk
- The Love Suicide at Schofield Barracks
- Masterbuilder Johnson
- Mountain Memory
- Old Man Joseph and His Family
- Oscar Over Here
- Over Martinis, Driving Somewhere
- Pageant
- Patronage
- Pops
- Precious Memories
- Sand Mountain
- Sand Mountain Matchmaking
- The Seasons, Man's Estate
- Shotgun
- Songs of Love
- The Sorrows of Frederick
- Southern Comfort
- Spain
- Stars
- Strindberg: Miss Julie and The Ghost Sonata
- Tennessee
- Three Poets
- True Crimes
- Two Whores
- Unchanging Love
- Why the Lord Come to Sand Mountain
- A Woman Without a Name
- Wrath
- Yancey
- Yankee Doodle

=== Novels ===
- Jesus tales. North Point Press. 1980.
