= Childe Byron =

1977 play by Romulus Linney

Childe Byron is a 1977 play by Romulus Linney about the strained relationship between the poet, Lord Byron, and his daughter, Ada Lovelace. Of Linney's more than sixty plays, Childe Byron is one he identified as holding a "deeply personal" connection. In his own words, he approached it through "the pain of a divorced father who can't reach his own daughter." In his narrative poem, Childe Harold's Pilgrimage, Byron wrote of the female infant he left behind when he went into exile: "I see thee not. I hear thee not. But none can be so rapt in thee.” When Linney re-read these words in preparation for the play, he recalled "My daughter Laura, the actress... her mother and I were separated and divorced when she was a baby, so these lines just laid me out."

== World premiere ==
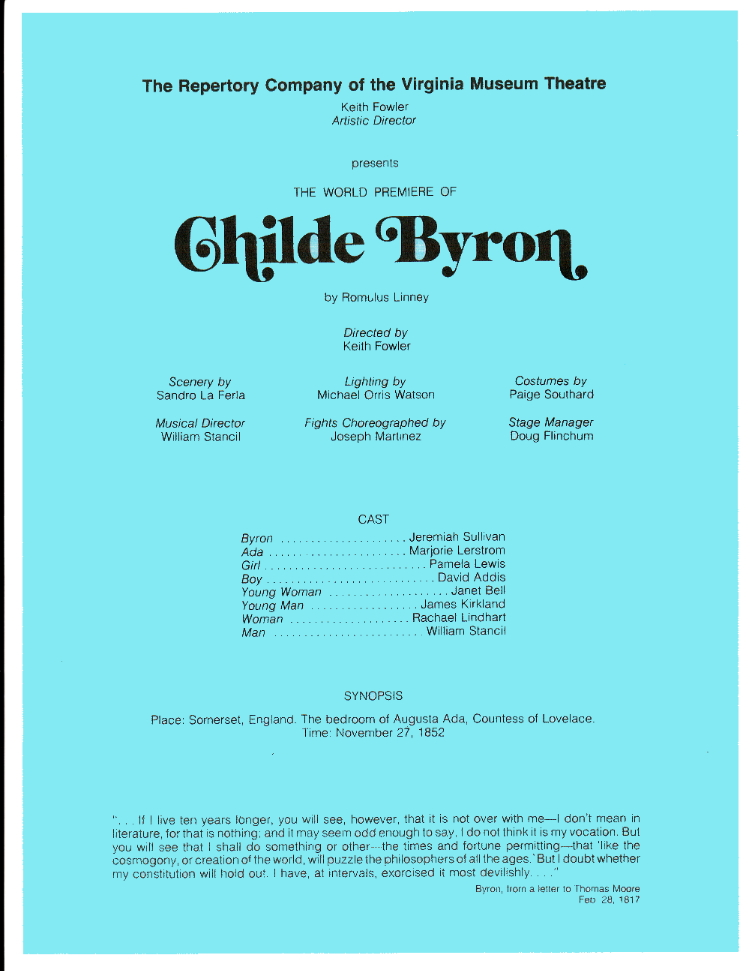
Program credits for the 1977 premiere of Romulus Linney's Childe Byron

The play received its first production on March 4, 1977 in the Virginia Museum of Fine Arts, on the stage of the Virginia Museum Theater (now the Leslie Cheek Theater) in Richmond, Virginia.

== Synopsis ==
The word "Childe" is an honorific once given to young aristocratic men who had not yet attained knighthood, and its use in the play's title is a reference to Lord Byron's poem, Childe Harold's Pilgrimage. The drama begins with Ada, the Countess of Lovelace, writing her will. She is a mathematician and the daughter of the infamous George Gordon, Lord Byron, a man reputed to be "mad, bad, and dangerous to know." She is dying of a painful cancer at age thirty-six, the same age he was when he died. Separated from him while he lived, she now hates his memory. As her own end is near, however, she desires to know more about the man. Her medicines stimulate her imagination, and she envisions him alive again. In incisive, witty dialogue she digs into the truth behind the legends surrounding her father. Six other actors play a diverse range of characters as she observes scenes from Byron's life, including his youthful incestuous relations with his sister, his homosexual adventures, his foolish marriage, and the causes of his disapprobation by British society.

Author Linney is known for his strong female characters, from Esther Dudley and Mrs. Madeline Lee in his Democracy to Lucy Lake in The Love Suicide at Schofield Barracks. His Ada Lovelace is one of his richest roles. Beginning with a deeply negative perception of her absent father, yet driven to understand his contradictions, Ada challenges his spirit remorselessly. In the contest she matches his masculine flippancy, but comes to see his essential honesty.

Discussing his dramatized women in The New York Times, Linney commented, "I'm not writing about what you're supposed to think of women, but what you really think of them. … Oh, they get credit for doing the right thing or the wrong thing, but not the unique or surprising thing. … I love the contradictions in women." In the end of Childe Byron, a compromising reconciliation between daughter and sire is reached—providing a freshly intimate view of the major Romantic poet of the early 19th century.

== Controversy ==
“The perils of the state as patron of the arts” was the headline of a Washington Post editorial criticizing the Virginia Museum’s reaction to its own theater's premiere of Childe Byron. In his commentary, staff writer Paul G. Edwards noted that America’s tradition of free speech and first amendment prohibition on governmental interference with public expression were challenged anew by the Virginia Museum trustees’ “obnoxious” attempts to censor the play that had been commissioned by their own artistic director. Indeed, the first production of Childe Byron caused a stir in conservative Richmond, the capitol of the old Confederacy. The play's subject matter drew controversy when the administrative director of the museum, in response to pressure from some trustees and a few influential patrons, called on artistic director Keith Fowler to remove a homosexual kiss and delete the word "fuck" from an historical quotation attributed to Byron. With playwright Linney's backing, Fowler declined the censorship directive.

National attention turned to the Byron conflict. Interviewed on NPR's "All Things Considered," Fowler said that he stood by author Linney's script despite the museum director's threat to close the show. "The order impinged directly on an area of artistic prerogative ... I discussed the problem with cast members and... they were very supportive of my stand." The Post editorial complained of the state-sponsored Virginia Museum's "Big Brother government" interference in theater art. A museum trustee was quoted as saying, "Accountability is the name of the game," to which the editorial replied, "Maybe in government, but not in theater. Theater goers have a right to assume that the art they pay to hear and see reflects the genius and biases of the playwright, players and play director, not the government." Local letter writers noted ironically that the sense of scandal that accompanied Byron in his lifetime seemed reflected in the new storm attending his stage debut. "Throughout his life," commented one correspondent, "Byron and his poetry drew both acclaim and outrage. The controversial reception of Childe Byron is a tribute to its success." Patrons on either side threatened to cancel subscriptions. Letters to editorial pages grew heated for and against the museum's attempt to impose revisions on the play.

Citing a dramatist's guild contract that protects a playwright's text, director Fowler prevailed, and the show remained intact throughout its run—although the artistic victory was to prove costly. When he called on the trustees to promise no further attempts to censor VMT productions, Fowler's contract was allowed to expire. Although the theater's subscriptions had more than doubled under his directorship, the administration found it expedient to let him go. His departure gave emphasis to the issue of artistic freedom, with some letter writers sensing that a golden age of Richmond theater was drawing to an end and lamenting the end of VMT as a "bastion of culture." The public response triggered by Childe Byron did not remain confined to the play. The museum's censorship attempt stirred citizen groups to challenge the powerful institution, including a letter of protest circulated by local artists who alleged that the museum had a pattern of peremptory censorship. The letter accused the museum of forcing Fowler's resignation and interfering with other artists' exhibitions. According to the minutes of the trustees' meetings, complaints of censorship occupied the institution's director and trustees for the ensuing three months In May, the Childe Byron incident was cited among other grounds for a possible "first amendment court case through the American Civil Liberties Union" against the Virginia Museum.

At the end of the 1977 theater season, Fowler was awarded Richmond Newspapers' "Phoebe" prize for "Best Direction" for the staging of Childe Byron. He was subsequently hired by his alma mater, the Yale School of Drama, to head the directing program there.

== Revivals ==
Childe Byron is one of prolific author Linney's most frequently revived plays. Not long after its Richmond premiere, the play was performed in 1979 by the Actors Theater in Louisville, where it was directed by Jon Jory. Its New York premiere was in 1981 in a production by Circle Repertory Company, directed by Marshall W. Mason and starring William Hurt as Byron and Lindsay Crouse as Ada. It was first produced on the West Coast in 1981 by South Coast Repertory in Costa Mesa, California. The play's first international production was by London's Young Vic in 1981, with pop star David Essex in the title role and Simon Gipps-Kent as the young Byron. The Penguin Repertory Theater of Rockland County, New York, presented a well-reviewed revival in 1987. Scarcely a year goes by without a revival by a regional American theater or a university. Philadelphia's Wilma Theater produced the drama in 1986; Baylor University presented its version in 2003; a revival by the Players Club in Swarthmore was in 2005, while Drake University offered it in 2013, over thirty-five years following its premiere. Childe Byron, acknowledged by Linney as a personal attempt by a divorced father to speak to his daughter (cf. footnotes 1 and 2), eventually led to a direct real-life link when actress Laura Linney performed the role of Ada in 1986 during her senior year at Brown University, a performance which her father described as the play's "crowning" event. Through the years, various directors have shown how the play can be staged as an historic spectacle—as in Philadelphia's Allens Lane production in 2012 where the focus was on Byron's relations with his large "entourage"... like a "modern-day posse"—or as an intimate, unpretentious study—as in the "compact, elegant little production" with "beauty and power" offered by the Eclipse Theater in 2001 at the Athenaeum in Chicago.
