= Charles H. Cowles =

American politician (1875–1957)

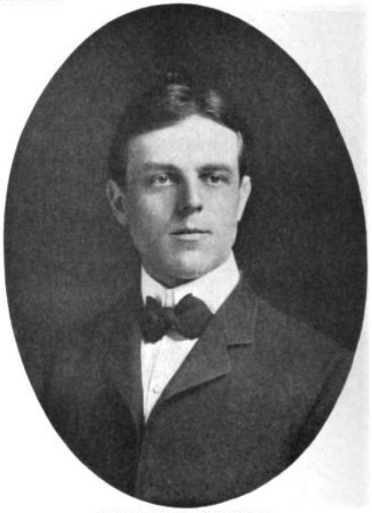

Member of the U.S. House of Representatives from North Carolina's 8th district
- In office March 4, 1909 – March 3, 1911
- Preceded by: Richard N. Hackett
- Succeeded by: Robert L. Doughton

Member of the North Carolina Senate
- In office 1938–1940

Member of the North Carolina House of Representatives
- In office 1904–1908
- In office 1920–1924
- In office 1928–1930
- In office 1932–1934
- In office 1909–1911

Personal details
- Born: Charles Holden Cowles; July 16, 1875 Charlotte, North Carolina, U.S.
- Died: October 2, 1957 (aged 82) Wilkesboro, North Carolina, U.S.
- Party: Republican
- Occupation: Politician

Charles Holden Cowles (July 16, 1875 – October 2, 1957) was a North Carolina Republican politician who served one term in the United States House of Representatives. He was the son of Calvin J. Cowles, a prominent Republican who was the son-in-law of William W. Holden. His uncle was Democratic Congressman William H. H. Cowles.

== Biography ==
A native of Charlotte, North Carolina, Cowles moved to Wilkesboro at a young age. He worked as a deputy clerk for the federal court at Statesville and then as secretary for Congressman Edmond S. Blackburn before being elected to the North Carolina House of Representatives (1904–1908). Cowles entered the newspaper business in 1906 when he established the Wilkes Patriot (today the Wilkes Journal-Patriot). In 1908, Cowles was elected to the 61st United States Congress as a Republican. He was defeated for re-election in 1910 by Robert L. Doughton.

Later, Cowles was again elected to terms in the North Carolina House of Representatives (1920–1924, 1928–1930, and 1932–1934) and to one term in the North Carolina Senate (1938–1940). From 1941 through 1956, he returned to one of his first jobs: serving as a federal court clerk.

He died at a rest home in Wilkesboro on October 2, 1957.

U.S. House of Representatives
Preceded by Richard N. Hackett	Member of the U.S. House of Representatives from North Carolina's 8th congressional district 1909–1911	Succeeded by Robert L. Doughton
