= Romulus Z. Linney =

American politician (1841–1910)

Romulus Zachariah Linney
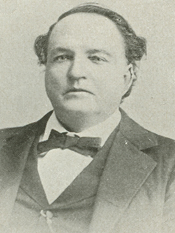

Member of the U.S. House of Representatives from North Carolina's 8th district
- In office March 4, 1895 – March 3, 1901
- Preceded by: William H. Bower
- Succeeded by: Edmund Spencer Blackburn

Member of the North Carolina Senate
- In office 1870; 1873; 1882

Personal details
- Born: December 26, 1841 Rutherford County, North Carolina, U.S.
- Died: April 15, 1910 (aged 68) Taylorsville, North Carolina, U.S.
- Party: Republican
- Relatives: Romulus Linney (great-grandson); Laura Linney (great-great-granddaughter)

Military service
- Allegiance: Confederate States of America
- Branch/service: Confederate States Army
- Rank: Private
- Unit: 7th North Carolina Infantry
- Battles/wars: American Civil War: Battle of Chancellorsville (WIA)

Romulus Zachariah Linney (December 26, 1841 – April 15, 1910) was an American politician who was a Republican U.S. Congressman from North Carolina between 1895 and 1901.

== Life and career ==
Linney was born in Rutherford County, North Carolina, the son of Martha (née Baxter) and William Coplin Linney. He attended common schools, York's Collegiate Institute, and Doctor Millen's School in Taylorsville, North Carolina. During the American Civil War, he served in the Confederate Army of Northern Virginia as a private in Company A of the 7th North Carolina Infantry. He was seriously wounded at the Battle of Chancellorsville.

After the war, he engaged in agricultural pursuits and studied law. Admitted to the bar in 1868, he opened a practice in Taylorsville. He was elected to the North Carolina Senate in 1870, 1873, and 1882 and then to the United States Congress in 1894, serving three terms in the 44th, 45th, and 46th Congresses (March 4, 1895 – March 3, 1901). While in the North Carolina Senate, Linney was a major proponent of the construction of the Alexander Railroad, then known as the Statesville & Western Railroad.

Linney died in Taylorsville in 1910 and is buried in the Taylorsville Cemetery. He is the great-grandfather of playwright Romulus Linney and great-great-grandfather of actress Laura Linney.

U.S. House of Representatives
Preceded by William H. Bower	Member of the U.S. House of Representatives from North Carolina's 8th congressional district 1895–1901	Succeeded by E. Spencer Blackburn
