= Jerzy Limon =

Polish literary scholar (1950–2021)

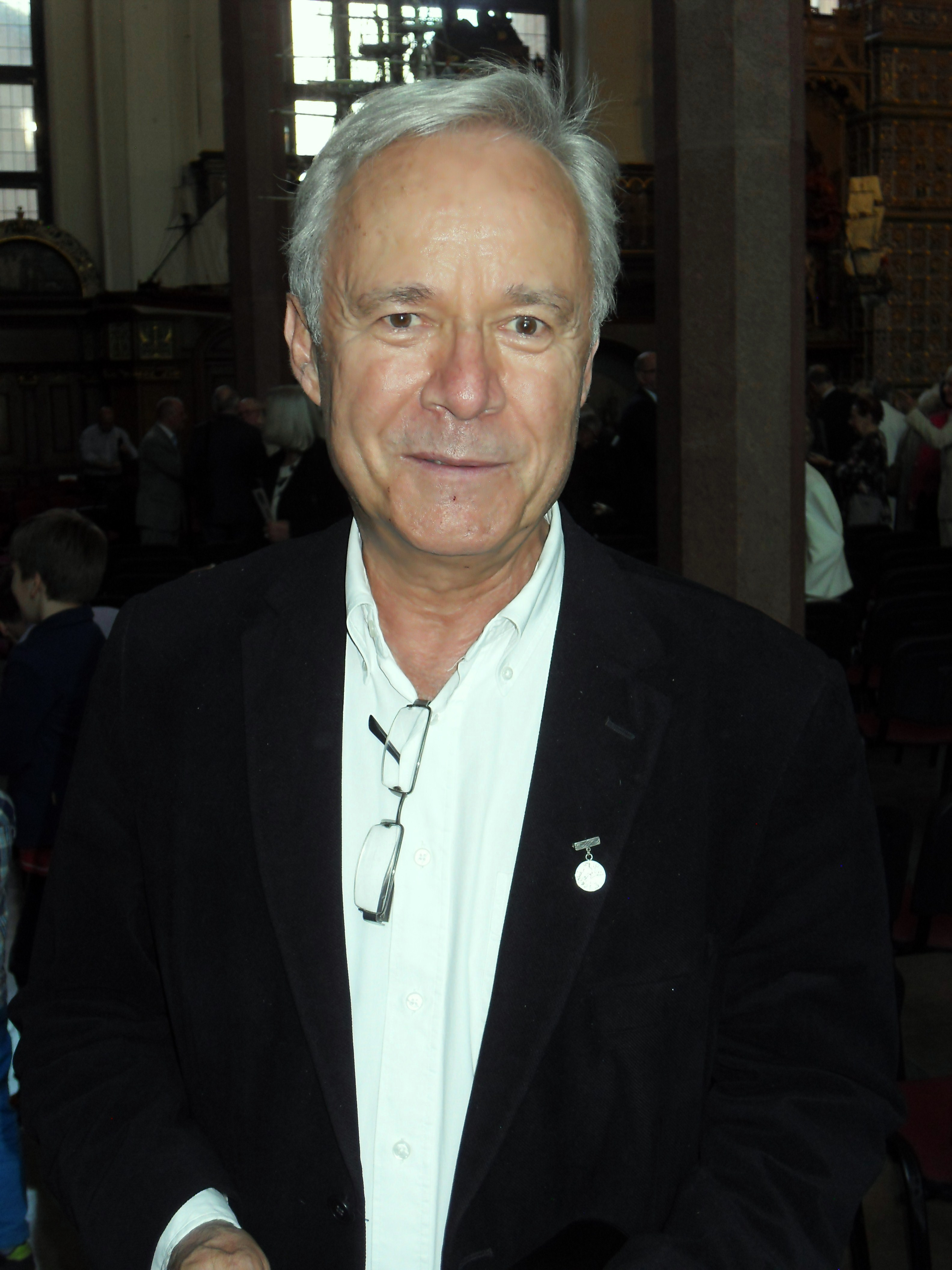
- Born: 24 May 1950; Malbork, Poland
- Died: 3 March 2021 (aged 70); Gdańsk, Poland
- Occupation: Theatrologist
- Spouse: Justyna Limon

Jerzy Limon (24 May 1950 – 3 March 2021) was a Polish literary scholar, translator and writer specialising in Shakespearean and Elizabethan theatre. He initiated the creation of the Gdańsk Shakespeare Theatre and served as its first director.

== Biography ==
He was born in Malbork to a family deported from the Polish Eastern Borderlands. His father Zenon Limon was a gynaecologist and his mother Wanda a nurse. When he was 12, Limon sailed on the ocean liner MS Batory to the United States and spent over a year there with his uncle in Chapel Hill, North Carolina. It was there that he learned to speak English fluently.

He studied English philology and the History of Art at the University of Poznań, graduating in 1975. He wrote his master's thesis and then his doctoral dissertation under the supervision of Professor Henryk Zbierski, a historian of English literature and a Shakespearologist. Under his supervision, he explored the repertoire of London theatres in the years 1623–1624, and Cambridge University Press published his work in 1986 under the title Dangerous Matter. English Drama and Politics in 1623/24 as a fruit of his one-year scholarship at the British Council.

Limon taught at the University of Gdańsk and, as visitor, at New York's Hunter College, Washington's Shakespeare Institute and at the University of Delaware and the University of Colorado. His main topic of study became the activity of English actors in Central and Eastern Europe in the 17th century and the Elizabethan theatre in Gdańsk. In the 1990s, inspired by his research, Limon started working on organising the construction of the Gdańsk Shakespeare Theatre and reviving Shakespearean traditions in Gdańsk. To this end he created the Theatrum Gedanense Foundation, which organised the Gdańsk Shakespearean Days, and then the International Shakespeare Festival. Construction of the Gdańsk Shakespeare Theatre began on 5 March 2011, and the building was officially opened on 19 September 2014. Prince Charles and director Andrzej Wajda were patrons of the project, and Prince William and Catherine, Duchess of Cambridge, took a tour of the theatre with Limon in 2017. In 2014 Limon received the Order of the British Empire.

Jerzy Limon died on 3 March 2021, as a result of a COVID-19 infection. His funeral was held on 27 March 2021, World Theatre Day. He was buried at the Communal Cemetery in Sopot.
