= Practical aesthetics =

Acting technique

Practical Aesthetics is an action-based acting technique originally conceived by David Mamet and William H. Macy, based on the teachings of Aristotle, Stanislavsky, Sanford Meisner, Joseph Campbell, and the Stoic philosopher Epictetus.

The method emphasizes script analysis and physical action over emotional recall, encapsulated in its core principle of prioritizing purposeful choices onstage.

The technique originated and developed at the Atlantic Theater Company and Atlantic Acting School in New York City. The book, A Practical Handbook for the Actor, written by members of the Atlantic Theater Company, outlines the technique of Practical Aesthetics.

== Technique ==
Practical Aesthetics is based on the practice of breaking down the process of acting into two essential components: Action and Moment, with the goal of simplifying the process of acting for the actor. The action is defined as "what you are doing onstage," while moment is about "how you are going to do it."

“Once you are deeply immersed in the given circumstances and have applied a clear method to the analysis of the text, then you can go onstage and completely let go.” -Anya Saffir, Atlantic Acting School

=== Action ===
That method begins by breaking down any script scene-by-scene, using four-step analysis that entails the following:

1) The Literal: An un-interpretive description of what the character is doing or saying through the scene. "What is the character literally doing?" For example, "The character is literally proposing marriage to their partner of six months."

2) The Want: What does one character ultimately want the other character to say or do. "What does my character want from the other person within the scene?" For example; 'Character A wants Character B to agree that they have found their soulmate"

3) The Essential Action: A universal ideal that relates to the specific and essential nature of what your character wants within the scene, stated as a verb/objective with its test in the other person. The Action is an interpretive choice made the actor, and there is an important separation between what the character wants and what the actor’s objective in the scene will be.

In this step, the actor distills the given circumstances and the behavior of the character, all given by the playwright, into a core objective/active onstage goal that underlies the text. For example, if the Literal is that the character is proposing to their partner of only six months, and the Want is "A wants B to agree that they have found their soulmate," the Essential Action underlying that specific Want could be, "To get someone to throw all caution to the wind."

If the Literal and Want were slightly different–say, “The character is literally proposing marriage to their partner of thirty-four years,” and the Want is “Character A wants B to agree it’s finally time to enjoy better insurance and tax advantages,” then the Essential Action might be, “To cut a good deal,” or “To get someone to fall in line,” or "To make a responsible choice."

4) The As If: This relates the Essential Action to the actor's own life. An important distinction is that this personalizes for the actor not the given circumstances of the scene, but rather their chosen action ("what you are doing onstage"). The As-If is used as a training and rehearsal device that makes the playing of action urgent and visceral to the actor, and helps them stay grounded and honest in an improvised encounter opposite their scene partner(s).

For example: If the Essential Action is, "to retrieve what is rightfully mine," then an actor's personal As If might be, "It’s as if my grandfather, who has dementia, has given away a precious family heirloom to a nosy neighbor who manipulated their way into getting it. I need to retrieve something that should rightfully stay in our family."

This step is not meant to be a memory device, but a way to activate the actor's imagination and body toward a personally meaningful, truthful task. Using Practical Aesthetics, actors are taught that using the memory of past experiences limits the improvisational play within a scene because they already know how that remembered experience went and how it ended.

“We don’t use emotional recall, but we engage our imagination, becoming an open vessel for the emotions.” -Mary McCann, Atlantic Acting School

Instead, the As-If ties the actor to an active goal, inviting them to think of something that could happen, but has not yet happened in their life, be it a personal worry or dread or dream or fantasy, that keeps the playing of action in the now, and gives the actor something to truthfully explore and fight for within a scene, with an outcome that is unknown.

Despite knowing how the scene unfolds for the characters because the actors have read the script, this tool helps actors to play their way through an objective that motivates the lines, rather than act their idea of how the scene should play out. Like an athlete playing a sport, using the As-If in rehearsal, the actor may improvise their action opposite the other actor’s action, trying to win their goal, eventually replacing the words of the As-If with the words of the scene, so that the acting maintains a spirit of discovery and suspense.

=== Moment ===
Once the actor has applied a clear analysis method to the text that immerses them in the given circumstances, they can enter the scene, onstage or on camera, with improvisational freedom in the moment.

“The writer has provided the words-the context. Script Analysis defines the action-the intention. How should you say the line? Perhaps, instead, you should ask, 'How does my scene partner need to hear the line? What would be the best way to achieve my action in this moment? Determine that, and then say the line in order to further that goal.'” -Robert Bella, Training of the American Actor

Actors are trained to put their attention outward toward the other actor(s), with tools that heighten their listening, physical engagement, and responsiveness.

"We are really interested in the live, spontaneous, improvised, unforeseeable moment." -Anya Saffir, Atlantic Acting School

Moment work involves the actor responding authentically to other actors and stimuli, grounded in the previously established Essential Action.

=== Comparison with other methods ===
Practical Aesthetics differs from Method acting and other classical systems by focusing on actionable objectives rather than emotional memory, emphasizing concrete goals and problem-solving. Reliable comparisons in secondary sources should be cited.

== Practitioners ==
Famous practitioners of Practical Aesthetics include William H Macy, Felicity Huffman, Elizabeth Olsen, Rose Byrne, Gina Rodriguez, Jessica Alba, Rhea Seehorn, Stephanie Hsu, and Clark Gregg.

Master teachers of Practical Aesthetics include Scott Zigler, Mary McCann, Karen Kohlhaas, Anya Saffir, Melissa Bruder, Lee Michael Cohn, Robert Bella, and Jacquelyn Landgraf.

== Bibliography ==
- Bruder, Melissa, et al. (1986). A Practical Handbook for the Actor. New York: Vintage Books. ISBN 0-394-74412-8
- Cohen, Robert (1978). Acting Power. New York: McGraw-Hill. ISBN 0-87-484408-8
- Cohen, Robert (2003). Acting Professionally: Raw Facts About Careers in Acting. New York: McGraw-Hill. ISBN 0-07-256259-5
- Mamet, David (1999). True and False: Heresy and Common Sense for the Actor. New York: Vintage Books. ISBN 0-679-77264-2
