= Bryan Reynolds (scholar) =

American writer and scholar (born 1965)

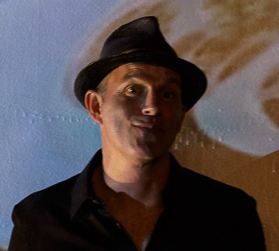
- Born: 1965 (age 60–61); Scarsdale, New York, United States
- Spouse(s): Kristine Lang (m. 2002; div. 2018) Partner: Gosia Lorenz
- Children: 2

Education
- Education: Harvard University (PhD, MA); UC Berkeley (BA)

Philosophical work
- Era: 21st-century
- Region: Western critical theory
- School: Performance studies, poststructuralism, theatre, postmodernism, phenomenology, Shakespeare
- Main interests: Performativity, critical theory, subjectivity, theatre, consciousness
- Notable ideas: Transversal poetics: a sociocognitive theory, performance aesthetics, and research methodology

Bryan Reynolds (born 1965), Claire Trevor Professor, Distinguished Professor, and Chancellor's Professor at the University of California-Irvine, is an American critical theorist, performance theorist, and Shakespeare scholar who developed the combined sociopolitical theory, performance aesthetics, and research methodology known as transversal poetics. He is also a playwright, director, performer, and cofounder of the Transversal Theater Company (an Amsterdam-based collective of international artists), whose plays have been produced in over twenty-five countries.

Reynolds received his bachelor's degree in English Literature at the University of California, Berkeley, and his master's and doctoral degrees in English and American Literature and Language at Harvard University. He has been a Professor of Drama at the University of California, Irvine since 1998. He has held visiting professorships at the University of London-Drama, the University of Amsterdam-Theater Studies, Utrecht University-Theater Studies, University of Cologne-American Studies, Johann Wolfgang Goethe University Frankfurt am Main-American Studies, University College Utrecht-Arts and Humanities, the University of California, San Diego-Theatre, Literature, Cognitive Science, the American University of Beirut-English, University of Tsukuba-Humanities and Social Sciences, University of Nairobi-Department of Literature, Alpen-Adria-Universität Klagenfurt-Communications, University of Lorraine-Arts, Sciences, & Business Management, INSEEC Business School (L'Institut des hautes études économiques et commerciales)-Marketing, Paris, Bordeaux, Lyon, École supérieure des sciences commerciales d'Angers (ESSCA); and he has taught at Deleuze Camp at Schloss Wahn, University of Cologne, Germany, and the Grotowski Institute in Wrocław, Poland, among other academic and performing arts institutions. Reynolds is also a regular contributor to Freeskier Magazine, where he publishes articles from his ongoing research on extreme sports.

== Early life ==
Born in New York City to Donna Reynolds, a VP of marketing at General Foods, and Donald Reynolds, a VC, Reynolds’ family moved from the Upper East Side to the Westchester County suburb of Scarsdale when he was a toddler. He attended Heathcote Elementary School, where he played soccer for the famed Heathcote Hornets through 8th grade, which was coached by New York Cosmos first general manager Clive Toye. He was also an avid skate boarder, BMXer, and skier, which informs his research on action sports. Not an enthusiastic student, Reynolds was encouraged to leave Scarsdale High School for the more disciplinary Archbishop Stepinac High School in White Plains. Reynolds returned to Scarsdale for his junior and senior years, where he joined a special program, called CORE, for students who had difficulties making it to class. Reynolds graduated in 1983 with a D average. His pursuit of a career racing motorcycle motocross brought him out to San Diego in 1985, where he attended Grossmont Community College. From there, he attended the University of California, Berkeley for his BA, and then Harvard University for his MA and PhD.

== Honours ==
- 2023: Awarded title, "Distinguished Professor," by the University of California.
- 2020: Tor Vergata Award, Railroad (director/playwright), 28th Annual Festival Internazionale del Teatro Patologico, Rome, Italy.
- 2016: Awarded endowed chair, "Claire Trevor Professor," University of California, Irvine.
- 2014: Research Award, International Centre for Muslim and non-Muslim Understanding (MnM), University of South Australia.
- 2014: Invitation Fellowship Award, Japan Society for the Promotion of Science.
- 2014: Distinguished Visiting Scholar, American University of Beirut, Lebanon.
- 2012: Awarded title of "Chancellor's Professor" by the University of California.
- 2008: Silver Award: Experimental Web Site, 5th Annual Pcom Creative Awards (Creative Director, Bryan Reynolds; Designer/Illustrator/Animator/Programmer, Alex Sacui).
- 2006: Honored as a Distinguished Alumnus of Scarsdale High School, New York.
- 2005: Awarded title of "Chancellor's Fellow" by the University of California.
- 2004: Honored by the University of Alabama's Hudson Strode Program in Renaissance Studies, directed by Gary Taylor, as "one of the six most brilliant Renaissance scholars in the world under 40," "for work on 'transversal poetics.'"
- 2001-2002: Distinguished Early-Career Faculty Award for Teaching, University of California, Irvine.

== Publications & theater works ==
=== Books written ===
- Art Beyond the Edge: Creativity and Conflict in a World on Fire, with Mark LeVine (University of California Press, 2026).
- Excess & Joy: Philosophical Transversations, with Guy Zimmerman (San Francisco: PCP Press, 2022).
- The Transversality of Gregory de la Haba: The Future of Art and Myth are Upon Us (San Francisco: PCP Press, 2022).
- Intermedial Theater: Performance Philosophy, Transversal Poetics, and the Future of Affect (London: Palgrave Macmillan, 2017).
- Transversal Subjects: From Montaigne to Deleuze after Derrida (London: Palgrave Macmillan, 2009).
- Transversal Enterprises in the Drama of Shakespeare and his Contemporaries: Fugitive Explorations (London: Palgrave Macmillan, 2006).
- Performing Transversally: Reimagining Shakespeare and the Critical Future (New York: Palgrave Macmillan, 2003).
- Becoming Criminal: Transversal Performance and Cultural Dissidence in Early Modern England (Baltimore: Johns Hopkins University Press, 2002).

=== Books edited ===
- Performance Studies: Key Words, Concepts and Theories, Editor (Houndmills, Basingstoke, UK: Palgrave Macmillan, 2014).
- The Return of Theory in Early Modern English Studies, Volume II, Co-Editor, with Paul Cefalu and Gary Kuchar (Houndmills, Basingstoke, UK: Palgrave Macmillan, 2014).
- The Return of Theory in Early Modern English Studies: Tarrying with the Subjunctive, Co-Editor, with Paul Cefalu (Houndmills, Basingstoke, UK: Palgrave Macmillan, 2011).
- Critical Responses to Kiran Desai, Co-Editor, with Sunita Sinha (New Delhi, India: Atlantic Publishers 2009).
- Rematerializing Shakespeare: Authority and Representation on the Early Modern English Stage, Co-Editor, with William West (London: Palgrave Macmillan, 2005).
- Shakespeare Without Class: Misappropriations of Cultural Capital, Co-Editor, with Donald Hedrick (New York: Palgrave Macmillan, 2000).

=== Plays ===
- Unbuckled (play), Written by Bryan Reynolds, The Anthology of Contemporary Plays 2004 (Sibiu, Romania: Annual Publication of the Sibiu International Theatre Festival, 2004).
- Woof, Daddy (play), Written by Bryan Reynolds.
- Railroad (play), Written by Bryan Reynolds, in Plays International (London: The Performing Arts Trust, October 2006).
- Blue Shade (play), Written by Bryan Reynolds, in Plays International (London: The Performing Arts Trust, October 2008) and in English and Romanian (Cluj: Babes-Bolyai University of Cluj Press, 2007).
- Lumping in Fargo (musical), Book and Lyrics by Bryan Reynolds; Music by Michael Hooker.
- Eve's Rapture (play), Written by Bryan Reynolds.
- The Green Knight (play), Book and Lyrics by Bryan Reynolds; Music by Michael Hooker.
- Macbeth, Adapted and Directed by Bryan Reynolds, Studio-T, University College Utrecht, Netherlands, September 2010.
- Romeo & Juliet, Adapted and Directed by Bryan Reynolds, Studio-T, University College Utrecht, Netherlands, September 2011.
- Titus Andronicus, Adapted and Directed by Bryan Reynolds, Studio-T, University College Utrecht, Netherlands, September 2012
- Fractalicious! (intermedial performance), Written by Bryan Reynolds; Director Guy Zimmerman; Director of Film Michael Moshe Dahan; Principal actors Bryan Reynolds & Jessica Emmanuel (originally Kayla Emerson).
- Bzzap! (play), Directed by Bryan Reynolds, Written by Robert Cohen, University of Amsterdam Theater, Netherlands, August 2014.
- Nabi Saleh (musical), Written and Directed by Bryan Reynolds, Music by Abed Hathout, a collaboration between Transversal Theater and the Jenin Freedom Theatre, workshop performance, Cinema Jenin Theatre, film presentation, Nabi Saleh, March 2015.
- My Dinner With You (play), Directed by Bryan Reynolds, Written by Niels Horeman.
- No Erasure (dance theater/play), Co-Directed & Co-Written with Jesús E. López Vargas, a collaboration between Transversal Theater and Dawar Arts, Jesuit Theater, Cairo, Egypt, April 2021.
- Curie, Curie (dance theater/play), Written and Directed by Bryan Reynolds, Choreography by Jessica Dunn, University of California, Irvine, xMPL Theater, Contemporary Arts Center, October 2021; Teatr STUDIO, Palace of Culture, Warsaw, Poland, January 2022.
- Interview the Dead (performance art/theater), Created and Directed by Bryan Reynolds.
- Anatomy of a Home (theater), Directed by Bryan Reynolds, Written by Raffi Feghali.
- After Images, or Marie Curie Remembers (dance theater/play), Written and Directed by Bryan Reynolds, Choreography by Jessica Dunn.
- The Passage (dance theater/play), Written and Directed by Bryan Reynolds, Choreography by Jessica Dunn.
- LifeLines (dance theater/play), written by Jon McKenzie, Bryan Reynolds & Saviana Stănescu, Directed by Bryan Reynolds.

=== Selected articles ===
- "The Devil's House, 'or worse': Transversal Power and Antitheatrical Discourse in Early Modern England," Theatre Journal 49:2 (May 1997).
- "The Transversality of Michel de Certeau: Foucault's Panoptic Discourse and the Cartographic Impulse," with Joseph Fitzpatrick in Diacritics 29:3 (Fall 1999).
- "The Making of Authorships: Transversal Navigation in the Wake of Hamlet, Robert Wilson, Wolfgang Wiens, and Shakespace," with D.J. Hopkins, in Shakespeare After Mass Media, Ed. Richard Burt (New York: Palgrave Macmillan, 2002).
- "The Reckoning of Moll Cutpurse: A Transversal Enterprise," with Janna Segal, Rogues and Early Modern English Culture, Eds. Craig Dionne and Steve Mentz (Ann Arbor: University of Michigan Press, 2004).
- "Transversal Poetics and Fugitive Explorations: Subject Performance, Early Modern English Theatre, and Macbeth," in Early Theatre 7:2 (2004).
- "EuroShakespace and the Witness-Function: Convergences of History, Memory, and Affective Presence," in Multicultural Shakespeare: Translation, Appropriation, Performance vol. 4, Ed. Lawrence Gunter (University of Łódź Press, 2007).
- "Transversal Acting," with Chris Marshall in Semiotic Review of Books 17.1 (2007).
- "From Homo Academicus to Poeta Publicus: Celebrity and Transversal Knowledge in Robert Greene's Friar Bacon and Friar Bungay (c. 1589)," with Henry Turner, Writing Robert Greene: New Essays on England's First Professional Writer, Eds. Edward Gieskes and Kirk Melnikoff (Hampshire, UK: Ashgate Press, 2008).
- "Theater of Immediacy, Transversal Poetics," with Mark LeVine, Performance Studies: Key Words, Concepts and Theories, Editor Bryan Reynolds (Houndmills, Basingstoke, UK: Palgrave Macmillan, 2014); about Mohamed Bouazizi and performance activism during the 2011 revolutions in Tunisia and Egypt.
- "No Brain, No Gain: The Mind-Body Fusion of The Backcountry Shredder," Freeskier Magazine 19:2 (2017)..
- "Skiing for Life: A Miracle Sport for Generative Happiness," Freeskier Magazine 20:2 (2017)..
- "Positive Visualization: From Believing to Performing," Freeskier Magazine May 6, 2019..
- "Every skier is an artist: Creativity, stoke and brain network dynamics," Freeskier Magazine January 21, 2020..
- "Cosmography via LifeLines: A Traumaturgy of Making Cures," with Jon McKenzie, Leeny Sack, & Saviana Stănescu, special issue of La Deleuziana, Making Cosmos: The Tangle of The Universe, N. 15: 2023..
- "Allorealist Ethics and the Transversal Power of Suicide: The Immanence of Deleuze and Guattari in Woof, Daddy," with Sam Kolodezh, Performing Ethos: International Journal of Ethics in Theatre & Performance PEET) 16 (2) pp. 167–190, 2026.
