= William Chamberlin =

William Chamberlin may refer to:

- William Henry Chamberlin (1897–1969), American historian and journalist
- William Henry Chamberlin (philosopher) (1870–1921), American theologian and Mormon philosopher
- William Chamberlain (politician) (1755–1828), Vermont politician who signed his name "Chamberlin"

== See also ==
- William Chamberlain (disambiguation)
- William Chamberlayne (disambiguation)
