= Virginia State Route 23 =

Virginia State Route 23 may refer to:

- State Route 23 (Virginia 1918-1933), Stuart to West Virginia towards Bluefield
- U.S. Route 23 (Virginia), from the early 1930s

== See also ==
- Virginia's 23rd congressional district (VA 23)
