= Massachusetts's 19th congressional district =

Obsolete district in Massachusetts, US

- Obsolete district
- Created: 1813
- Eliminated: 1820
- Years active: 1813–1821

Massachusetts's current districts, since 2013

Massachusetts's 19th congressional district is an obsolete district. During its short tenure of 1813–1821 it was located in the District of Maine, prior to Maine achieving statehood.

== List of members representing the district ==
Representative	Party	Years	Cong ress	Electoral history	District location
District created March 4, 1813
James Parker (Gardiner)	Democratic-Republican	March 4, 1813 – March 3, 1815	13th	Elected in 1813 on the second ballot. Redistricted to the 18th district and lost re-election.	1813 – 1821 "6th Eastern district," District of Maine
Samuel S. Conner (Waterville)	Democratic-Republican	March 4, 1815 – March 3, 1817	14th	Elected in 1815 on the second ballot. Ran in the 18th district and lost re-election.	1813 – 1821 "6th Eastern district," District of Maine
Joshua Gage (Augusta)	Democratic-Republican	March 4, 1817 – March 3, 1819	15th	Elected in 1817 on the fifth ballot. [data missing]	1813 – 1821 "6th Eastern district," District of Maine
Joshua Cushman (Winslow)	Democratic-Republican	March 4, 1819 – March 3, 1821	16th	Elected in 1818. District moved to Maine.	1813 – 1821 "6th Eastern district," District of Maine
District moved to Maine March 3, 1821
