= William Chamberlayne =

William Chamberlayne may refer to:

- William Chamberlayne (poet)
- William Chamberlayne (MP)
- William Chamberlayne (soldier)
- William Chamberlayne (burgess)

== See also ==
- William Chamberlain (disambiguation)
