= Joshua Gage =

American politician (1763–1831)

Member of the Executive Council of Maine
- In office 1822–1824
- Governor: Albion Parris

Member of the Maine Senate from Kennebec County
- In office 1820–1822

Member of the U.S. House of Representatives from Massachusetts's 19th district
- In office March 4, 1817 – March 3, 1819
- Preceded by: Samuel S. Conner
- Succeeded by: Joshua Cushman

Member of the Massachusetts House of Representatives from Augusta
- In office 1815–1817
- In office 1805–1807

Member of the Massachusetts Senate from Kennebec County
- In office 1813

Personal details
- Born: August 7, 1763 Harwich, Province of Massachusetts Bay, British America
- Died: January 24, 1831 (aged 67) Augusta, Maine, U.S.
- Party: Democratic-Republican
- Spouse: Abigail
- Children: Daniel, Henry, Caroline, Franklin
- Occupation: Mariner

Joshua Gage (August 7, 1763 – January 24, 1831) was a U.S. representative from Massachusetts. Born in Harwich, Massachusetts, Gage completed preparatory studies. In 1795, he moved to Augusta (then a part of Massachusetts' District of Maine). He was a master mariner, and subsequently became engaged in mercantile pursuits. Gage was the Chairman of the Augusta, Massachusetts, Board of Selectmen, in 1803. He served as member of the Massachusetts House of Representatives, and served in the Massachusetts State Senate. He also served as Treasurer of Kennebec County from 1810 to 1831.

Gage was elected as a Democratic-Republican to the Fifteenth Congress (March 4, 1817 – March 3, 1819). After leaving the House Gage served as member of the Executive Council of Maine in Governor Parris' administration. Gage died in Augusta on January 24, 1831.

U.S. House of Representatives
Preceded by Samuel S. Conner	Member of the U.S. House of Representatives from Massachusetts's 19th congressional district March 4, 1817 - March 3, 1819	Succeeded by Joshua Cushman
