= William Chamberlain =

William Chamberlain may refer to:

- William Chamberlain (MP), (died 1445), British politician, MP for Truro and Southampton
- William Tankerville Chamberlain (1751–1802), Irish judge
- William Chamberlain (politician) (1755–1828), American Representative from Vermont
- William Charles Chamberlain (1818–1878), British Royal Navy rear admiral
- William H. Chamberlain (1931–1972), American politician
- William Chamberlain (technologist), author of the poetry-generating computer program Racter
- Bill Chamberlain (1949–2025), American basketball player
- Bill Chamberlain (baseball) (1909–1994), American Major League Baseball pitcher
- William Chamberlain (priest) (died 1666), English canon of Windsor
- William Joseph Chamberlain (died 1945), English journalist and pacifist

== See also ==
- William Chamberlin (disambiguation)
- William Chamberlayne (disambiguation)
