= List of United States congressional districts =

U.S. congressional districts of the 119th Congress (2025–2027) with territories Interactive map version

Change in apportionment of congressional districts, starting in 2023, as a result of the 2020 United States census

Congressional districts in the United States are electoral divisions of the purpose of electing members of the United States House of Representatives. The number of voting seats within the House of Representatives is currently set at 435, with each one representing an average of 761,169 people following the 2020 United States census. The number of voting seats has applied since 1913, excluding a temporary increase to 437 after the admissions of Alaska and Hawaii. The total number of state members is capped by the Reapportionment Act of 1929. In addition, each of the five inhabited U.S. territories and the federal district of Washington, D.C., sends a non-voting delegate to the House of Representatives.

The Bureau of the Census conducts a constitutionally mandated decennial census whose figures are used to determine the number of congressional districts to which each state is entitled, in a process called "apportionment". The 2022 elections were the first to be based on the congressional districts which were defined based on the 2020 United States census.

Each state is responsible for the redistricting of districts within their state, while several states have one "at-large" division (Alaska, Delaware, North Dakota, South Dakota, Vermont, and Wyoming). Redistricting must take place if the number of members changes following a re-apportionment, or may take place at any other time if demographics represented in a district have changed substantially. Setting the boundaries of states' congressional districts is the responsibility of state governments, who often gerrymander districts for various reasons. Districts may sometimes retain the same boundaries, while changing their district numbers.

Each congressional district is expected to be equal in population to all other congressional districts in a state. The boundaries and numbers shown for the congressional districts are established by their respective state's constitution or court orders in the apportionment and redistricting cycle.

== Delimitation ==
Many other nations assign independent bodies to oversee and mandate the delimitation of boundaries; however, in some nations the legislature manages this process. In the United States, legislatures play a commanding role in the redistricting (as delimitation is referred to in the United States) of congressional districts. The redrawing of boundaries occurs after the decennial census; single-member constituencies are responsible for the election of the legislators that govern this process. In 25 states the state legislature is responsible for creating the redistricting plan, but six states (Alaska, Delaware, North Dakota, South Dakota, Vermont and Wyoming) do not require redistricting for the House of Representatives and instead elect a single representative for the entire state. Each state has its own constitution and laws surrounding the redistricting process, and most of the modern criteria applied federally have come about through rulings by the U.S. Supreme Court.

Prior to 1962, there was limited federal and state government regulation on redistricting, and these were rarely enforced. However, after the Baker v. Carr (1962) decision redistricting became justiciable and courts became an active participant in the redistricting process of congressional districts as the decision allowed voters to challenge redistricting plans. Since Shaw v. Reno (1993) and Abrams v. Johnson (1997), the courts have invalidated numerous congressional redistricting plans upon the basis of traditional districting principles. These decisions have been surrounded in controversy as the Supreme Court has not identified these 'traditional' criteria explicitly, resulting in the major political parties attempting to abuse the lack of legislation and definition to advantage their respective parties. According to the database of redistricting laws in all fifty states and previous court decisions, the de facto principles are: compactness, contiguity, equal population, and preserving county and city boundaries.

== Extremes ==
=== Population ===
- Average population: 761,169 people based on 2020 U.S. census. It was 708,377 in 2010.
- State with the highest average district population: Delaware (989,948). In 2010, Montana: 994,416.
- State with the lowest average district population: Montana (542,113). In 2010, Rhode Island: 527,624.
- District with the most people: Delaware at-large (989,948). In 2010, Montana at-large: 994,416.
- District with the fewest people: Rhode Island's 1st (545,085). In 2010, also Rhode Island's 1st: 526,283.

=== Area ===
- District with the greatest area: Alaska at-large, same as in 2010.
- District with the greatest area that comprises less than an entire state: Montana's 2nd. In 2010: New Mexico's 2nd.
- District with the smallest area: New York's 12th. In 2010: New York's 13th.

=== Oldest district ===
- Delaware at-large, same geographical borders since 1789.

=== Cook Partisan Voting Index ===
- District with the highest Cook PVI score for the Democratic Party: Pennsylvania's 3rd
- District with the highest Cook PVI score for the Republican Party: Alabama's 4th

== List of districts by area and population ==
The following is a complete list of the 435 current congressional districts for the House of Representatives, and 248 obsolete districts, and the six current and one obsolete non-voting delegations. The list includes the 435 voting districts of the 119th United States Congress, effective from 2025 to 2027.

Rank	District	Land area (mi^{2})	Land area (km^{2})	Population estimate (2024)
1	Alaska at-large	571,241.61	1,479,508.97	740,133
2	Montana 2	105,382.55	272,939.56	558,158
3	Wyoming at-large	97,088.55	251,458.19	587,618
4	South Dakota at-large	75,807.94	196,341.67	924,669
5	Oregon 2	72,158.83	186,890.52	704,768
6	Nebraska 3	69,613.74	180,298.76	649,934
7	North Dakota at-large	68,994.26	178,694.32	796,568
8	Nevada 2	65,065.49	168,518.85	802,677
9	Texas 23	58,788.47	152,261.44	806,011
10	Arizona 2	58,353.74	151,135.50	853,923
11	New Mexico 3	52,316.48	135,499.06	708,684
12	New Mexico 2	51,426.16	133,193.13	710,491
13	Colorado 3	49,950.41	129,370.97	742,698
14	Kansas 1	49,634.61	128,553.04	731,386
15	Idaho 2	43,245.56	112,005.50	967,957
16	Nevada 4	41,790.41	108,236.67	833,125
17	Montana 1	40,167.69	104,033.84	579,075
18	Idaho 1	39,399.80	102,045.01	1,033,662
19	Utah 2	39,218.27	101,574.85	880,783
20	Texas 13	35,104.57	90,920.42	799,858
21	Oklahoma 3	32,613.10	84,467.53	797,016
22	Colorado 4	32,138.01	83,237.06	789,599
23	Minnesota 8	31,239.65	80,910.32	727,411
24	Minnesota 7	31,039.41	80,391.69	722,392
25	Texas 19	30,169.59	78,138.89	787,118
26	Utah 3	28,715.22	74,372.07	830,117
27	Maine 2	27,548.04	71,349.09	697,280
28	Michigan 1	26,920.07	69,722.66	787,617
29	California 1	26,393.41	68,358.62	759,259
30	Arizona 9	23,229.33	60,163.69	915,903
31	Wisconsin 7	23,110.54	59,856.02	754,076
32	Arkansas 4	22,676.60	58,732.14	744,382
33	California 3	21,666.74	56,116.60	807,351
34	Oklahoma 2	21,630.58	56,022.95	815,354
35	Iowa 4	21,433.05	55,511.35	801,546
36	Missouri 6	20,254.59	52,459.15	788,896
37	Arkansas 1	19,849.09	51,408.90	754,656
38	Texas 11	19,205.73	49,742.61	802,030
39	Washington 5	18,711.90	48,463.59	801,690
40	Missouri 8	18,315.28	47,436.36	776,269
41	Mississippi 2	17,996.03	46,609.52	694,703
42	California 23	17,966.66	46,533.43	758,179
43	Washington 4	17,885.49	46,323.19	794,949
44	New Mexico 1	17,570.09	45,506.33	711,081
45	Illinois 15	16,752.80	43,389.55	739,197
46	New York 21	16,288.85	42,187.94	767,674
47	Arizona 7	15,417.65	39,931.54	813,289
48	Kansas 2	15,298.46	39,622.83	739,248
49	Louisiana 4	14,603.32	37,822.42	767,466
50	Kansas 4	14,563.96	37,720.49	745,885
51	Missouri 4	14,355.14	37,179.63	784,156
52	West Virginia 1	14,340.14	37,140.79	861,893
53	Illinois 12	14,015.96	36,301.17	745,901
54	Arizona 6	13,691.88	35,461.79	833,838
55	California 2	13,038.54	33,769.65	752,654
56	Pennsylvania 15	12,982.18	33,623.68	758,111
57	Iowa 2	12,902.70	33,417.83	797,329
58	Minnesota 1	12,238.15	31,696.67	718,116
59	California 25	11,955.87	30,965.57	792,416
60	Kentucky 5	11,748.97	30,429.69	736,508
61	Mississippi 3	11,722.42	30,360.94	734,735
62	Oregon 4	11,613.07	30,077.72	712,690
63	Kentucky 1	11,499.40	29,783.31	759,138
64	Colorado 2	11,445.07	29,642.60	728,333
65	Texas 28	11,357.29	29,415.25	825,116
66	Wisconsin 3	11,227.74	29,079.72	740,873
67	Georgia 8	10,928.22	28,303.96	787,897
68	Iowa 1	10,844.57	28,087.31	804,704
69	Iowa 3	10,673.35	27,643.86	837,909
70	Louisiana 5	10,456.54	27,082.31	763,961
71	Texas 17	10,437.15	27,032.09	798,340
72	Texas 27	10,428.06	27,008.56	793,985
73	Alabama 7	10,274.64	26,611.19	718,912
74	Utah 1	10,271.32	26,602.61	871,848
75	Virginia 9	10,070.55	26,082.60	782,270
76	Georgia 2	9,953.18	25,778.63	757,227
77	Mississippi 1	9,942.04	25,749.77	753,783
78	Florida 2	9,853.83	25,521.31	819,004
79	Washington 8	9,827.75	25,453.76	794,910
80	California 5	9,807.72	25,401.89	772,810
81	Oklahoma 4	9,733.71	25,210.18	819,271
82	Michigan 2	9,704.77	25,135.24	788,872
83	West Virginia 2	9,701.10	25,125.73	908,086
84	California 20	9,672.81	25,052.46	816,324
85	Georgia 12	9,632.95	24,949.22	786,415
86	Alabama 2	9,465.03	24,514.32	703,362
87	Texas 1	9,464.63	24,513.29	795,955
88	Virginia 5	9,464.11	24,511.93	805,334
89	Tennessee 8	9,226.41	23,896.29	774,995
90	Vermont at-large	9,217.26	23,872.59	648,493
91	Texas 25	8,994.96	23,296.84	826,421
92	Illinois 16	8,914.43	23,088.27	752,764
93	Alabama 4	8,630.11	22,351.89	735,310
94	North Carolina 1	8,342.08	21,605.90	753,478
95	New York 19	8,225.38	21,303.64	776,282
96	Indiana 8	8,096.08	20,968.75	758,402
97	Texas 10	7,667.75	19,859.38	832,921
98	Louisiana 3	7,625.36	19,749.60	777,847
99	Missouri 3	7,584.79	19,644.52	799,877
100	Ohio 2	7,383.46	19,123.06	790,454
101	Georgia 1	7,360.10	19,062.57	806,580
102	Florida 3	7,321.91	18,963.66	845,635
103	Washington 3	7,309.49	18,931.50	802,855
104	Kentucky 2	7,291.99	18,886.16	775,395
105	Mississippi 4	7,264.08	18,813.89	759,824
106	Alabama 1	7,240.75	18,753.46	760,389
107	Colorado 7	7,161.21	18,547.45	728,241
108	New York 24	7,088.57	18,359.31	772,889
109	Washington 6	6,956.61	18,017.54	799,758
110	South Carolina 6	6,926.08	17,938.45	762,934
111	North Carolina 3	6,850.07	17,741.59	775,182
112	New Hampshire 2	6,810.15	17,638.22	700,189
113	Alabama 3	6,690.22	17,327.58	737,665
114	Wisconsin 8	6,680.87	17,303.37	747,225
115	Tennessee 4	6,473.25	16,765.63	826,508
116	New York 23	6,458.25	16,726.78	773,707
117	Florida 18	6,449.60	16,704.38	875,428
118	Pennsylvania 13	6,362.38	16,478.49	769,505
119	Texas 21	6,297.31	16,309.95	846,025
120	California 13	6,292.60	16,297.75	790,923
121	Virginia 6	6,264.60	16,225.23	797,837
122	North Carolina 11	6,242.65	16,168.40	770,851
123	Texas 15	6,230.46	16,136.81	812,527
124	Hawaii 2	6,219.49	16,108.40	727,086
125	Indiana 4	6,096.60	15,790.13	789,018
126	Pennsylvania 9	6,073.27	15,729.69	770,915
127	Indiana 9	6,037.01	15,635.78	764,291
128	Nebraska 1	5,982.30	15,494.09	672,915
129	Texas 36	5,944.78	15,396.91	816,162
130	Tennessee 6	5,919.07	15,330.32	803,181
131	Tennessee 7	5,891.32	15,258.45	816,216
132	Texas 6	5,858.52	15,173.49	848,575
133	Missouri 7	5,775.52	14,958.52	803,037
134	South Carolina 3	5,633.91	14,591.76	766,747
135	Texas 31	5,612.90	14,537.36	901,458
136	Oregon 5	5,591.62	14,482.23	717,312
137	Ohio 12	5,580.81	14,454.22	812,727
138	Ohio 5	5,528.22	14,318.02	796,997
139	South Carolina 7	5,407.67	14,005.81	794,163
140	Arkansas 2	5,301.54	13,730.93	773,214
141	Michigan 5	5,233.18	13,553.87	775,260
142	Georgia 10	5,204.81	13,480.39	835,755
143	Texas 4	5,201.82	13,472.66	874,662
144	South Carolina 5	5,160.49	13,365.62	782,718
145	Wisconsin 6	5,030.60	13,029.20	743,039
146	California 24	4,886.14	12,655.03	756,496
147	Ohio 4	4,879.90	12,638.89	810,105
148	Louisiana 6	4,869.79	12,612.70	753,643
149	Kentucky 4	4,844.51	12,547.21	776,082
150	North Carolina 7	4,841.79	12,540.17	805,748
151	Ohio 6	4,779.15	12,377.95	775,304
152	Pennsylvania 14	4,774.73	12,366.50	752,379
153	Michigan 9	4,638.21	12,012.91	782,471
154	California 18	4,572.91	11,843.79	766,286
155	Illinois 17	4,481.92	11,608.12	743,507
156	Alabama 6	4,448.50	11,521.57	728,184
157	Washington 2	4,404.09	11,406.54	789,531
158	Utah 4	4,390.89	11,372.35	920,865
159	Indiana 3	4,390.44	11,371.18	774,688
160	Tennessee 1	4,354.28	11,277.53	797,902
161	Indiana 2	4,349.54	11,265.25	751,821
162	California 22	4,313.07	11,170.80	770,684
163	Wisconsin 2	4,300.90	11,139.29	763,361
164	North Carolina 5	4,201.04	10,880.63	755,224
165	Georgia 3	4,166.22	10,790.46	799,818
166	Arkansas 3	4,164.71	10,786.55	816,102
167	Texas 34	4,121.86	10,675.56	796,178
168	Tennessee 3	3,956.32	10,246.81	809,872
169	Illinois 2	3,916.79	10,144.45	732,352
170	Alabama 5	3,901.77	10,105.55	773,877
171	Maryland 1	3,866.41	10,013.95	791,864
172	Pennsylvania 16	3,840.90	9,947.90	758,988
173	Kentucky 6	3,792.81	9,823.32	777,299
174	California 4	3,780.05	9,790.27	760,875
175	North Carolina 8	3,725.02	9,647.75	788,892
176	North Carolina 13	3,715.91	9,624.17	835,054
177	Louisiana 1	3,652.62	9,460.24	798,569
178	California 48	3,614.69	9,362.01	768,439
179	Texas 5	3,597.13	9,316.51	856,312
180	Oklahoma 5	3,540.68	9,170.31	836,356
181	Virginia 4	3,427.39	8,876.91	810,465
182	Florida 6	3,410.11	8,832.15	834,806
183	Georgia 9	3,405.52	8,820.25	828,902
184	Oregon 1	3,351.98	8,681.58	716,626
185	Maine 1	3,297.05	8,539.31	707,732
186	Indiana 6	3,282.32	8,501.18	777,157
187	North Carolina 9	3,254.05	8,427.95	790,294
188	Florida 1	3,197.64	8,281.85	817,541
189	Texas 22	3,156.50	8,175.31	894,683
190	South Carolina 2	3,113.05	8,062.76	764,414
191	Virginia 1	3,039.12	7,871.28	823,798
192	Georgia 14	2,942.34	7,620.62	795,580
193	Texas 8	2,848.23	7,376.88	946,825
194	California 19	2,816.56	7,294.86	741,135
195	Pennsylvania 8	2,769.36	7,172.61	773,187
196	Michigan 7	2,766.00	7,163.91	792,585
197	Virginia 7	2,723.77	7,054.54	825,445
198	South Carolina 1	2,589.15	6,705.86	797,468
199	Ohio 9	2,588.55	6,704.30	776,236
200	Tennessee 2	2,576.12	6,672.13	813,928
201	Minnesota 6	2,484.44	6,434.68	755,084
202	Texas 14	2,450.81	6,347.56	787,873
203	Ohio 14	2,432.65	6,300.55	785,649
204	New York 22	2,421.90	6,272.69	765,288
205	Maryland 6	2,395.10	6,203.29	821,685
206	Michigan 4	2,386.19	6,180.21	785,367
207	Florida 26	2,300.65	5,958.66	851,047
208	Illinois 13	2,264.31	5,864.53	741,808
209	Kansas 3	2,261.58	5,857.46	754,087
210	Massachusetts 1	2,233.36	5,784.38	779,993
211	Michigan 8	2,230.81	5,777.78	769,318
212	Indiana 5	2,194.78	5,684.44	791,265
213	North Carolina 14	2,192.36	5,678.18	792,862
214	Florida 28	2,184.62	5,658.15	791,591
215	Florida 20	2,151.66	5,572.78	818,131
216	Virginia 2	2,150.83	5,570.62	788,048
217	New Hampshire 1	2,143.64	5,551.99	708,843
218	Wisconsin 5	2,143.50	5,551.64	750,363
219	Tennessee 5	2,059.04	5,332.90	835,216
220	Connecticut 2	2,021.15	5,234.75	731,305
221	Louisiana 2	2,005.26	5,193.59	736,254
222	Nevada 3	2,004.83	5,192.50	839,433
223	New Jersey 2	1,994.30	5,165.22	794,193
224	Illinois 14	1,974.93	5,115.05	766,577
225	Texas 26	1,965.74	5,091.24	884,703
226	Delaware at-large	1,948.54	5,046.69	1,051,917
227	Ohio 15	1,925.67	4,987.47	823,011
228	Oregon 6	1,895.03	4,908.11	720,968
229	North Carolina 10	1,871.94	4,848.30	787,565
230	New York 18	1,862.87	4,824.80	791,202
231	Ohio 8	1,792.67	4,642.98	791,238
232	Missouri 2	1,790.83	4,638.24	773,921
233	Massachusetts 2	1,783.82	4,620.06	801,772
234	Florida 4	1,782.00	4,615.36	842,213
235	Minnesota 2	1,727.80	4,474.97	746,020
236	California 26	1,714.89	4,441.53	751,974
237	Virginia 10	1,690.49	4,378.36	821,178
238	North Carolina 6	1,652.02	4,278.70	794,243
239	Florida 12	1,650.67	4,275.21	871,072
240	Florida 9	1,650.42	4,274.56	909,540
241	Florida 8	1,640.02	4,247.63	831,434
242	Florida 11	1,600.09	4,144.21	893,440
243	Arizona 1	1,597.51	4,137.52	819,479
244	Wisconsin 1	1,533.90	3,972.78	739,693
245	Maryland 5	1,516.81	3,928.53	805,367
246	California 27	1,516.11	3,926.71	748,971
247	Florida 21	1,506.29	3,901.27	859,087
248	Pennsylvania 11	1,501.23	3,888.18	781,923
249	Georgia 11	1,475.93	3,822.63	811,695
250	Colorado 5	1,471.80	3,811.94	745,409
251	Florida 17	1,453.66	3,764.95	877,095
252	Texas 3	1,435.72	3,718.50	920,628
253	Oregon 3	1,386.21	3,590.26	700,007
254	New York 20	1,366.03	3,538.01	790,733
255	New Jersey 7	1,347.62	3,490.31	789,429
256	California 9	1,346.85	3,488.34	784,710
257	California 41	1,327.17	3,437.35	824,187
258	Ohio 7	1,320.78	3,420.81	789,433
259	Massachusetts 9	1,255.16	3,250.84	797,381
260	Pennsylvania 10	1,254.75	3,249.79	792,599
261	Connecticut 5	1,246.13	3,227.45	728,034
262	South Carolina 4	1,233.75	3,195.40	810,387
263	Nebraska 2	1,218.96	3,157.10	682,617
264	Pennsylvania 7	1,167.73	3,024.40	788,445
265	Florida 16	1,154.48	2,990.09	882,786
266	Indiana 1	1,102.37	2,855.12	760,512
267	Georgia 7	1,101.44	2,852.73	815,698
268	New Jersey 3	1,080.77	2,799.19	795,627
269	Oklahoma 1	1,078.63	2,793.65	827,396
270	North Carolina 4	1,052.90	2,726.99	804,357
271	Colorado 8	1,010.07	2,616.08	757,119
272	Nevada 1	999.63	2,589.03	792,232
273	Ohio 10	990.48	2,565.33	791,001
274	Michigan 6	978.11	2,533.30	768,949
275	Texas 12	964.72	2,498.62	852,259
276	Pennsylvania 6	925.01	2,395.76	796,009
277	Illinois 11	918.71	2,379.45	766,584
278	Pennsylvania 17	893.14	2,313.23	753,416
279	California 21	891.31	2,308.48	775,200
280	Florida 7	834.48	2,161.28	813,213
281	New York 17	824.68	2,135.92	783,152
282	Maryland 2	811.19	2,100.96	783,097
283	Michigan 3	804.84	2,084.53	791,175
284	California 28	787.85	2,040.52	750,492
285	Tennessee 9	768.53	1,990.48	749,932
286	Rhode Island 2	766.01	1,983.96	556,563
287	Massachusetts 3	750.36	1,943.43	792,213
288	Pennsylvania 4	725.88	1,880.03	786,204
289	Washington 10	707.98	1,833.65	776,532
290	New York 25	707.68	1,832.89	768,525
291	Pennsylvania 1	699.56	1,811.85	768,164
292	California 7	680.45	1,762.37	764,481
293	Florida 19	679.40	1,759.64	826,915
294	Massachusetts 4	672.20	1,740.99	802,402
295	New York 1	663.47	1,718.38	782,097
296	Connecticut 1	656.44	1,700.16	734,950
297	Florida 15	654.30	1,694.62	835,404
298	New Jersey 4	651.25	1,686.73	795,125
299	New Jersey 5	649.45	1,682.06	794,119
300	Texas 2	628.51	1,627.83	882,070
301	Ohio 13	621.80	1,610.47	785,020
302	Illinois 1	611.55	1,583.92	735,259
303	Ohio 1	601.39	1,557.59	809,863
304	Florida 5	592.02	1,533.33	852,413
305	California 14	580.46	1,503.39	728,854
306	Arizona 8	575.29	1,489.99	815,902
307	California 10	537.41	1,391.89	773,816
308	Georgia 13	534.20	1,383.58	820,432
309	Massachusetts 6	532.67	1,379.62	796,651
310	California 16	529.07	1,370.28	751,938
311	Texas 35	520.74	1,348.70	873,155
312	Georgia 6	517.34	1,339.90	803,570
313	Illinois 10	510.14	1,321.25	749,775
314	Maryland 3	500.61	1,296.56	782,840
315	California 49	495.94	1,284.48	748,243
316	California 8	481.18	1,246.25	748,589
317	Connecticut 3	473.93	1,227.48	741,529
318	Minnesota 3	468.11	1,212.39	710,658
319	Connecticut 4	444.85	1,152.16	739,251
320	New Jersey 12	438.34	1,135.30	808,427
321	Pennsylvania 12	425.68	1,102.51	754,530
322	Missouri 5	422.31	1,093.78	776,496
323	North Carolina 2	408.99	1,059.28	790,747
324	Arizona 5	405.28	1,049.67	902,036
325	New Jersey 11	394.49	1,021.72	800,060
326	California 40	391.18	1,013.15	744,076
327	New Jersey 1	368.05	953.23	784,146
328	Texas 30	355.20	919.97	788,414
329	Washington 1	332.09	860.12	810,553
330	Texas 16	315.48	817.10	784,072
331	Michigan 11	315.15	816.24	787,210
332	Kentucky 3	307.75	797.07	763,950
333	Texas 38	307.68	796.89	810,804
334	Colorado 6	306.67	794.28	730,108
335	Minnesota 4	303.19	785.26	708,464
336	California 32	296.24	767.25	763,344
337	Massachusetts 8	293.39	759.88	784,982
338	Illinois 8	285.45	739.32	752,591
339	California 39	284.12	735.86	780,819
340	Indiana 7	276.01	714.86	757,121
341	Maryland 8	273.44	708.20	773,463
342	North Carolina 12	273.35	707.96	801,527
343	Texas 24	270.75	701.24	772,892
344	Georgia 4	269.42	697.81	759,754
345	Florida 14	269.11	696.99	826,751
346	Rhode Island 1	267.88	693.81	555,745
347	New York 26	261.43	677.11	760,693
348	Florida 10	256.79	665.07	802,532
349	California 50	256.53	664.41	759,815
350	Virginia 3	252.37	653.64	775,248
351	California 6	251.52	651.43	761,692
352	Virginia 11	250.95	649.96	792,747
353	Florida 22	250.75	649.43	804,159
354	Missouri 1	247.95	642.19	742,814
355	New York 2	238.59	617.94	777,625
356	Texas 18	230.76	597.66	825,192
357	Pennsylvania 5	229.20	593.63	768,273
358	Florida 13	227.70	589.75	762,930
359	Michigan 10	227.27	588.62	775,317
360	Illinois 6	225.22	583.31	764,465
361	Georgia 5	225.10	583.01	771,555
362	Texas 37	223.50	578.85	775,784
363	Massachusetts 5	219.31	568.01	790,877
364	Texas 33	218.79	566.66	790,618
365	Ohio 3	217.80	564.10	787,191
366	Texas 9	217.55	563.45	822,791
367	Maryland 4	217.17	562.46	763,420
368	Ohio 11	215.59	558.38	759,075
369	Michigan 13	215.30	557.63	784,609
370	California 42	212.29	549.84	722,218
371	California 31	207.67	537.87	724,696
372	Arizona 3	205.87	533.20	834,750
373	Texas 29	205.63	532.58	755,796
374	Hawaii 1	203.10	526.03	719,060
375	Florida 25	198.76	514.78	807,029
376	New York 3	192.83	499.44	775,796
377	New Jersey 6	191.78	496.70	786,792
378	Michigan 12	191.05	494.82	751,709
379	California 51	189.93	491.91	766,304
380	California 33	189.19	490.00	783,103
381	Washington 9	182.64	473.03	775,676
382	Texas 20	179.50	464.90	766,778
383	California 17	179.32	464.45	762,984
384	California 30	179.30	464.38	741,397
385	Arizona 4	178.85	463.21	793,264
386	California 35	177.22	459.01	764,929
387	California 47	173.09	448.29	756,257
388	Illinois 9	167.73	434.43	740,435
389	Florida 23	165.04	427.46	802,266
390	Illinois 5	155.10	401.72	773,710
391	Colorado 1	153.90	398.60	735,987
392	Illinois 3	153.85	398.46	732,771
393	California 38	149.33	386.77	722,610
394	Texas 32	149.12	386.22	765,626
395	Virginia 8	147.21	381.28	788,825
396	Wisconsin 4	139.97	362.53	722,345
397	Washington 7	137.41	355.88	811,726
398	California 52	135.29	350.39	756,396
399	Minnesota 5	130.81	338.81	705,006
400	Texas 7	130.71	338.55	770,214
401	Maryland 7	130.22	337.28	741,484
402	California 29	128.97	334.03	724,033
403	New York 16	124.04	321.27	773,517
404	Florida 27	119.23	308.81	788,713
405	California 15	116.24	301.07	723,474
406	New York 4	114.05	295.40	777,491
407	New Jersey 9	110.74	286.82	772,342
408	California 45	103.62	268.38	741,928
409	Florida 24	99.61	257.98	830,040
410	California 36	97.11	251.52	754,490
411	Illinois 4	95.76	248.01	712,078
412	California 12	92.66	239.98	756,336
413	California 44	91.14	236.04	742,823
414	New Jersey 10	77.54	200.83	800,200
415	California 46	74.78	193.68	763,396
416	California 43	72.18	186.94	719,690
417	Illinois 7	68.43	177.22	760,384
418	New York 11	64.23	166.35	759,734
419	Pennsylvania 2	64.02	165.81	738,540
420	Massachusetts 7	60.69	157.19	789,900
421	Pennsylvania 3	53.06	137.44	767,563
422	California 37	52.77	136.66	744,775
423	New Jersey 8	50.63	131.12	780,391
424	California 34	49.68	128.66	754,617
425	New York 5	47.10	121.99	766,680
426	California 11	41.37	107.15	729,775
427	New York 14	29.33	75.97	737,491
428	New York 8	26.68	69.10	739,447
429	New York 6	25.80	66.83	726,418
430	New York 7	21.95	56.84	777,946
431	New York 15	18.60	48.17	754,448
432	New York 10	15.33	39.71	757,254
433	New York 9	15.21	39.38	711,601
434	New York 13	11.01	28.51	747,542
435	New York 12	9.57	24.78	752,016

== Alabama ==
Alabama's congressional districts since 2025 Interactive map version

- Territory: 1818–1819 (obsolete since statehood)
- At-large: 1819–1823, 1841–1843, 1873–1877, 1913–1917, 1963–1965 (obsolete)
- 1st district: 1823–1841, 1843–1963, 1965–present
- 2nd district: 1823–1841, 1843–1963, 1965–present
- 3rd district: 1823–1841, 1843–1963, 1965–present
- 4th district: 1833–1841, 1843–1963, 1965–present
- 5th district: 1833–1841, 1843–1963, 1965–present
- 6th district: 1843–1963, 1965–present
- 7th district: 1843–1863, 1877–1963, 1965–present
- 8th district: 1877–1963, 1965–1973 (obsolete since the 1970 census)
- 9th district: 1893–1963 (obsolete since the 1960 census)
- 10th district: 1917–1933 (obsolete since the 1930 census)

== Alaska ==
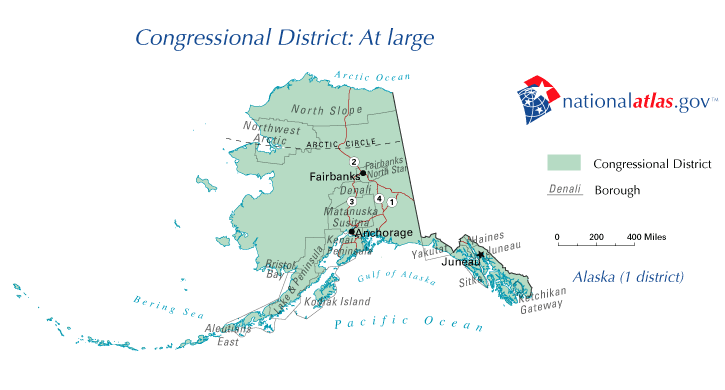
Alaska's at-large district since 1959

- Territory: 1906–1959 (obsolete since statehood)
- At-large: 1959–present

== American Samoa ==
See Non-voting delegations, below.

== Arizona ==
Arizona's congressional districts since 2023 Interactive map version

- Territory: 1863–1912 (obsolete since statehood)
- At-large: 1912–1949 (obsolete)
- 1st district: 1949–present
- 2nd district: 1949–present
- 3rd district: 1963–present
- 4th district: 1973–present
- 5th district: 1983–present
- 6th district: 1993–present
- 7th district: 2003–present
- 8th district: 2003–present
- 9th district: 2013–present

== Arkansas ==
Arkansas's congressional districts since 2023 Interactive map version

- Territory: 1819–1836 (obsolete since statehood)
- At-large: 1836–1853, 1873–1875, 1883–1885 (obsolete)
- 1st district: 1853–present
- 2nd district: 1853–present
- 3rd district: 1863–present
- 4th district: 1875–present
- 5th district: 1885–1963 (obsolete since the 1960 census)
- 6th district: 1893–1963 (obsolete since the 1960 census)
- 7th district: 1903–1953 (obsolete since the 1950 census)

== California ==
California's congressional districts since 2023 Interactive map version

- At-large: 1849–1865, 1883–1885 (obsolete)
- 1st district: 1865–present
- 2nd district: 1865–present
- 3rd district: 1865–present
- 4th district: 1873–present
- 5th district: 1885–present
- 6th district: 1885–present
- 7th district: 1893–present
- 8th district: 1903–present
- 9th district: 1913–present
- 10th district: 1913–present
- 11th district: 1913–present
- 12th district: 1933–present
- 13th district: 1933–present
- 14th district: 1933–present
- 15th district: 1933–present
- 16th district: 1933–present
- 17th district: 1933–present
- 18th district: 1933–present
- 19th district: 1933–present
- 20th district: 1933–present
- 21st district: 1943–present
- 22nd district: 1943–present
- 23rd district: 1943–present
- 24th district: 1953–present
- 25th district: 1953–present
- 26th district: 1953–present
- 27th district: 1953–present
- 28th district: 1953–present
- 29th district: 1953–present
- 30th district: 1953–present
- 31st district: 1963–present
- 32nd district: 1963–present
- 33rd district: 1963–present
- 34th district: 1963–present
- 35th district: 1963–present
- 36th district: 1963–present
- 37th district: 1963–present
- 38th district: 1963–present
- 39th district: 1973–present
- 40th district: 1973–present
- 41st district: 1973–present
- 42nd district: 1973–present
- 43rd district: 1973–present
- 44th district: 1983–present
- 45th district: 1983–present
- 46th district: 1993–present
- 47th district: 1993–present
- 48th district: 1993–present
- 49th district: 1993–present
- 50th district: 1993–present
- 51st district: 1993–present
- 52nd district: 1993–present
- 53rd district: 2003–2023 (obsolete due to the 2020 census)

== Colorado ==
Colorado's congressional districts since 2023 Interactive map version

- Territory: 1861–1876 (obsolete since statehood)
- At-large: 1876–1893, 1903–1915 (obsolete)
- 1st district: 1893–present
- 2nd district: 1893–present
- 3rd district: 1915–present
- 4th district: 1915–present
- 5th district: 1973–present
- 6th district: 1983–present
- 7th district: 2003–present
- 8th district: 2023–present

== Connecticut ==
Connecticut's congressional districts since 2023 Interactive map version

- At-large: 1789–1837, 1903–1913, 1933–1965 (obsolete)
- 1st district: 1837–present
- 2nd district: 1837–present
- 3rd district: 1837–present
- 4th district: 1837–present
- 5th district: 1837–1843, 1913–present
- 6th district: 1837–1843, 1965–2003 (obsolete since the 2000 census)

== Delaware ==
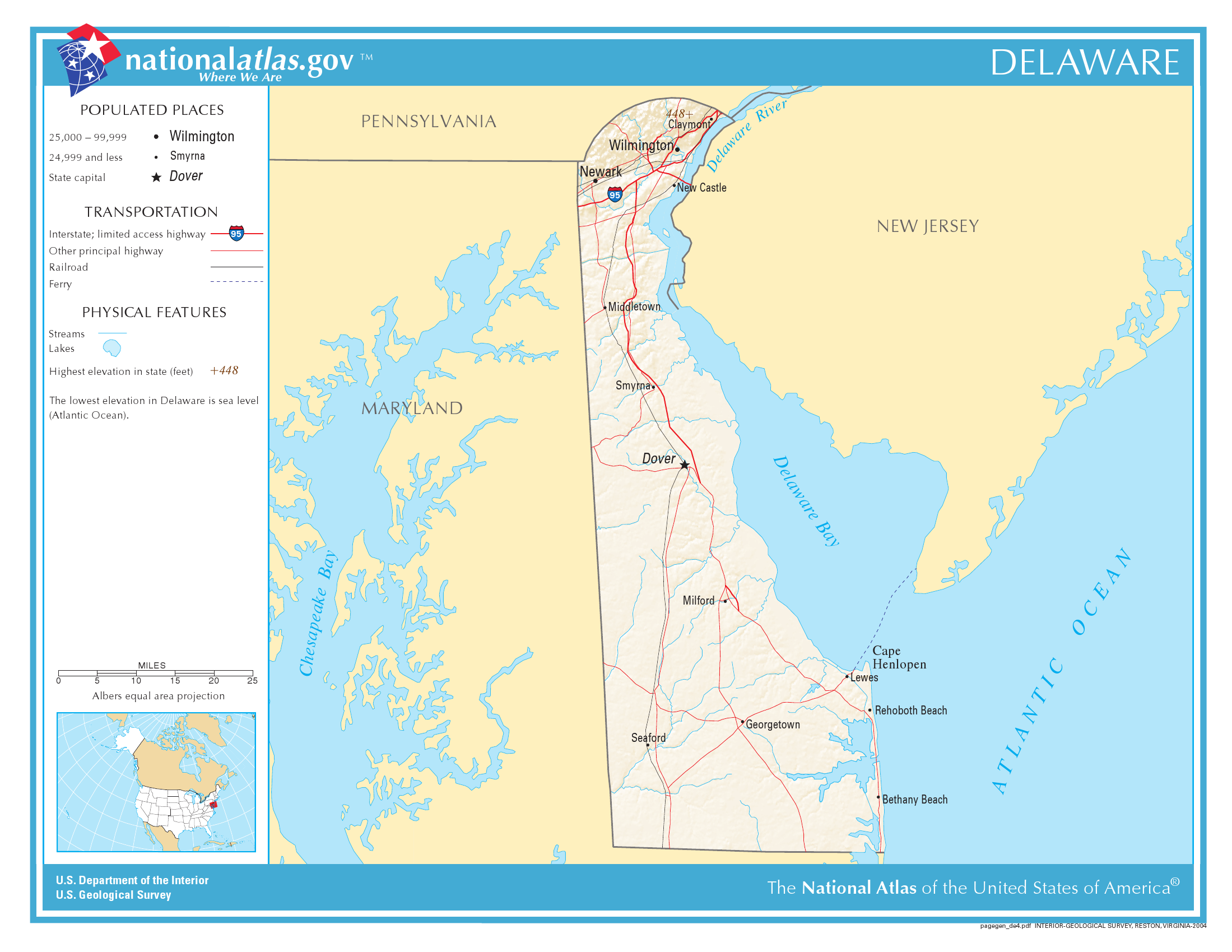
Delaware's at-large district since 1789

- At-large: 1789–present

The oldest district in the country, it has never changed its shape or size. From 1813 to 1823, Delaware had two representatives — both chosen at-large on a general ticket from the same statewide district.

== District of Columbia ==
See Non-voting delegations, below.

== Florida ==
Florida's congressional districts since 2023 Interactive map version

- Territory: 1822–1845 (obsolete since statehood)
- At-large: 1845–1875, 1913–1915, 1933–1937, 1943–1945 (obsolete)
- 1st district: 1875–present
- 2nd district: 1875–present
- 3rd district: 1903–present
- 4th district: 1915–present
- 5th district: 1937–present
- 6th district: 1945–present
- 7th district: 1953–present
- 8th district: 1953–present
- 9th district: 1963–present
- 10th district: 1963–present
- 11th district: 1963–present
- 12th district: 1963–present
- 13th district: 1973–present
- 14th district: 1973–present
- 15th district: 1973–present
- 16th district: 1983–present
- 17th district: 1983–present
- 18th district: 1983–present
- 19th district: 1983–present
- 20th district: 1993–present
- 21st district: 1993–present
- 22nd district: 1993–present
- 23rd district: 1993–present
- 24th district: 2003–present
- 25th district: 2003–present
- 26th district: 2013–present
- 27th district: 2013–present
- 28th district: 2023–present

== Georgia ==
Georgia's congressional districts since 2025 Interactive map version

- At-large: 1793–1827, 1829–1845, 1883–1885 (obsolete)
- 1st district: 1789–1793, 1827–1829, 1845–present
- 2nd district: 1789–1793, 1827–1829, 1845–present
- 3rd district: 1789–1793, 1827–1829, 1845–present
- 4th district: 1827–1829, 1845–present
- 5th district: 1827–1829, 1845–present
- 6th district: 1827–1829, 1845–present
- 7th district: 1827–1829, 1845–present
- 8th district: 1845–1863, 1873–present
- 9th district: 1873–present
- 10th district: 1885–present
- 11th district: 1893–1933, 1993–present
- 12th district: 1913–1933, 2003–present
- 13th district: 2003–present
- 14th district: 2013–present

== Guam ==
See Non-voting delegations, below.

== Hawaii ==
Hawaii's congressional districts since 2023 Interactive map version

- Territory: 1900–1959 (obsolete since statehood)
- At-large: 1959–1971 (obsolete)
- 1st district: 1971–present
- 2nd district: 1971–present

== Idaho ==
Map of Idaho's congressional districts since 2023 Interactive map version

- Territory: 1864–1890 (obsolete since statehood)
- At-large: 1890–1919 (obsolete)
- 1st district: 1919–present
- 2nd district: 1919–present

== Illinois ==
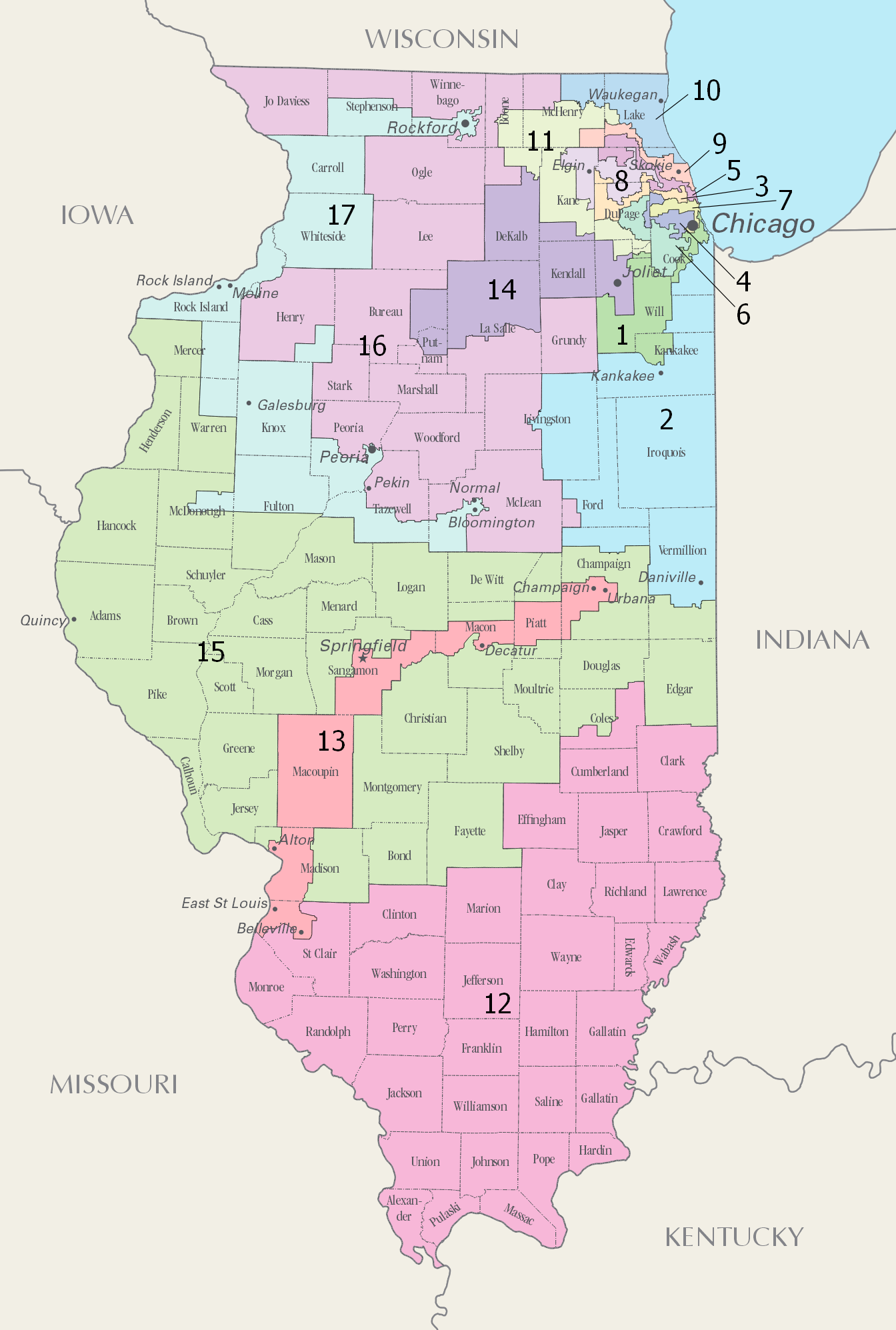
Illinois's congressional districts since 2023 Interactive map version

- Territory: 1812–1818 (obsolete since statehood)
- At-large: 1818–1833, 1863–1873, 1893–1895, 1913–1949 (obsolete)
- 1st district: 1833–present
- 2nd district: 1833–present
- 3rd district: 1833–present
- 4th district: 1843–present
- 5th district: 1843–present
- 6th district: 1843–present
- 7th district: 1843–present
- 8th district: 1853–present
- 9th district: 1853–present
- 10th district: 1863–present
- 11th district: 1863–present
- 12th district: 1863–present
- 13th district: 1863–present
- 14th district: 1873–present
- 15th district: 1873–present
- 16th district: 1873–present
- 17th district: 1873–present
- 18th district: 1873–2023 (obsolete due to the 2020 census)
- 19th district: 1873–2013 (obsolete since the 2010 census)
- 20th district: 1883–2003 (obsolete since the 2000 census)
- 21st district: 1895–1993 (obsolete since the 1990 census)
- 22nd district: 1895–1993 (obsolete since the 1990 census)
- 23rd district: 1903–1983 (obsolete since the 1980 census)
- 24th district: 1903–1983 (obsolete since the 1980 census)
- 25th district: 1903–1963 (obsolete since the 1960 census)
- 26th district: 1949–1953 (obsolete since the 1950 census)

== Indiana ==
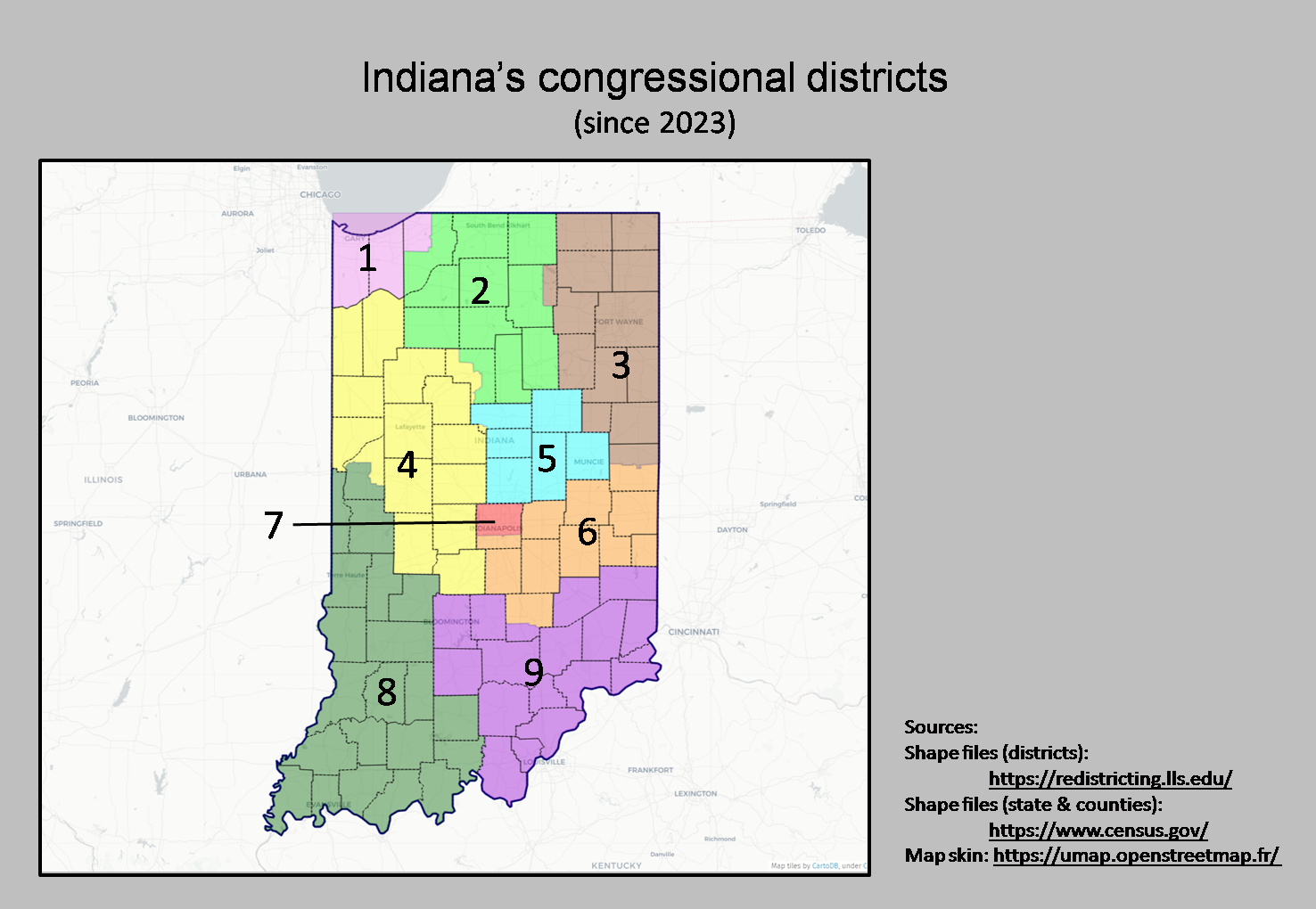
Indiana's congressional districts since 2023 Interactive map version

- Territory: 1805–1816 (obsolete since statehood)
- At-large: 1816–1823, 1873–1875 (obsolete)
- 1st district: 1823–present
- 2nd district: 1823–present
- 3rd district: 1823–present
- 4th district: 1833–present
- 5th district: 1833–present
- 6th district: 1833–present
- 7th district: 1833–present
- 8th district: 1843–present
- 9th district: 1843–present
- 10th district: 1843–2003 (obsolete since the 2000 census)
- 11th district: 1853–1983 (obsolete since the 1980 census)
- 12th district: 1875–1943 (obsolete since the 1940 census)
- 13th district: 1875–1933 (obsolete since the 1930 census)

== Iowa ==
Iowa's congressional districts since 2023 Interactive map version

- Territory: 1838–1846 (obsolete since statehood)
- At-large: 1846–1847 (obsolete)
- 1st district: 1847–present
- 2nd district: 1847–present
- 3rd district: 1863–present
- 4th district: 1863–present
- 5th district: 1863–2013 (obsolete since the 2010 census)
- 6th district: 1863–1993 (obsolete since the 1990 census)
- 7th district: 1873–1973 (obsolete since the 1970 census)
- 8th district: 1873–1963 (obsolete since the 1960 census)
- 9th district: 1873–1943 (obsolete since the 1940 census)
- 10th district: 1883–1933 (obsolete since the 1930 census)
- 11th district: 1883–1933 (obsolete since the 1930 census)

== Kansas ==
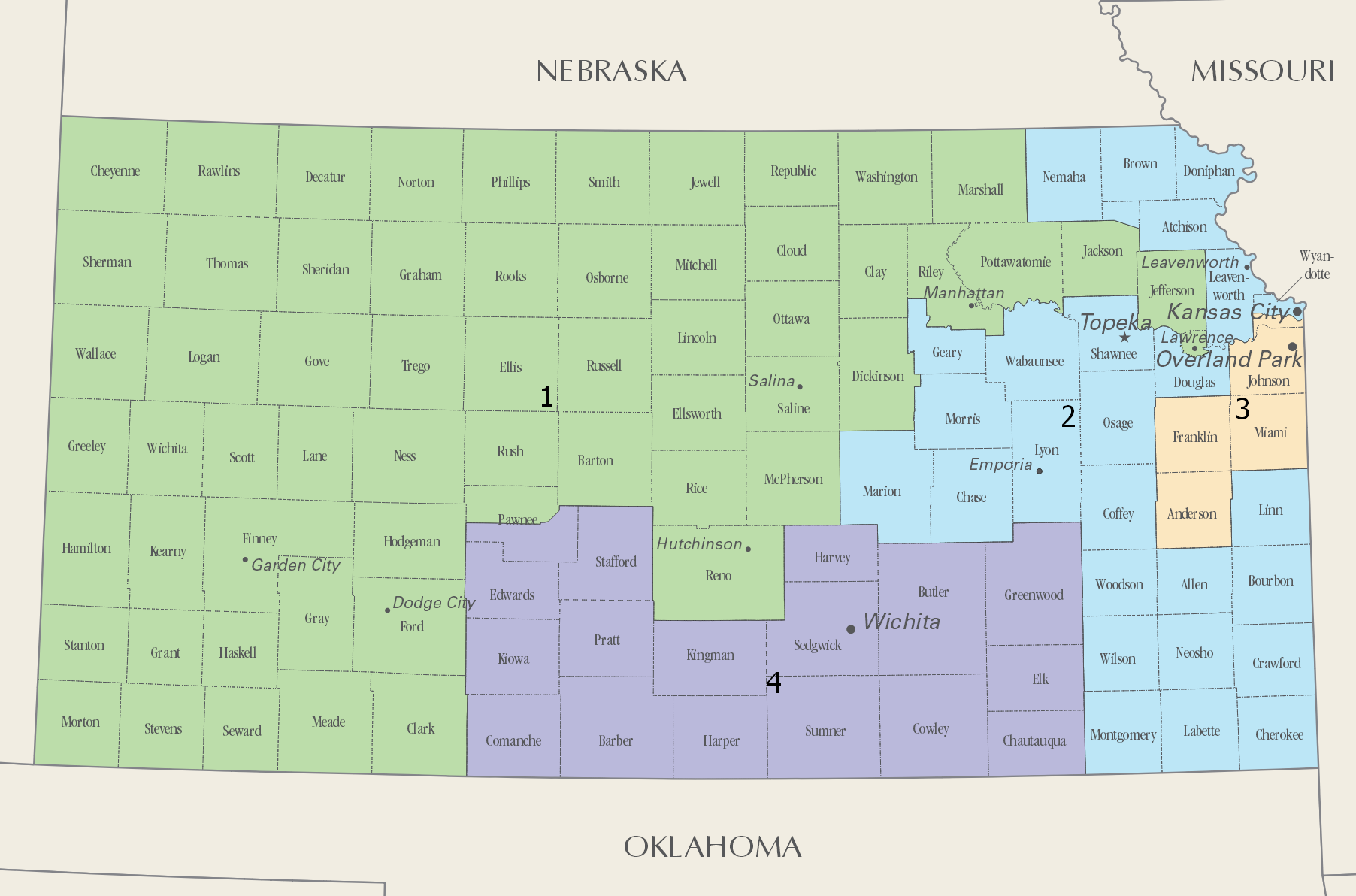
Kansas's congressional districts since 2023 Interactive map version

- Territory: 1854–1861 (obsolete since statehood)
- At-large: 1861–1875, 1883–1885, 1893–1907 (obsolete)
- 1st district: 1875–present
- 2nd district: 1875–present
- 3rd district: 1875–present
- 4th district: 1885–present
- 5th district: 1885–1993 (obsolete since the 1990 census)
- 6th district: 1885–1963 (obsolete since the 1960 census)
- 7th district: 1885–1943 (obsolete since the 1940 census)
- 8th district: 1907–1933 (obsolete since the 1930 census)

== Kentucky ==
Kentucky's congressional districts since 2023 Interactive map version

- At-large: 1933–1935 (obsolete)
- 1st district: 1792–1933, 1935–present
- 2nd district: 1792–1933, 1935–present
- 3rd district: 1803–1933, 1935–present
- 4th district: 1803–1933, 1935–present
- 5th district: 1803–1933, 1935–present
- 6th district: 1803–1933, 1935–present
- 7th district: 1813–1933, 1935–1993 (obsolete since the 1990 census)
- 8th district: 1813–1933, 1935–1963 (obsolete since the 1960 census)
- 9th district: 1813–1933, 1935–1953 (obsolete since the 1950 census)
- 10th district: 1813–1863, 1873–1933 (obsolete since the 1930 census)
- 11th district: 1823–1843, 1883–1933 (obsolete since the 1930 census)
- 12th district: 1823–1843 (obsolete since the 1840 census)
- 13th district: 1833–1843 (obsolete since the 1840 census)

== Louisiana ==
Louisiana's congressional districts since 2025 Interactive map version

- Orleans Territory: 1806–1812 (obsolete since statehood)
- At-large: 1812–1823, 1873–1875 (obsolete)
- 1st district: 1823–present
- 2nd district: 1823–present
- 3rd district: 1823–present
- 4th district: 1843–present
- 5th district: 1863–present
- 6th district: 1875–present
- 7th district: 1903–2013 (obsolete since the 2010 census)
- 8th district: 1913–1993 (obsolete since the 1990 census)

== Maine ==
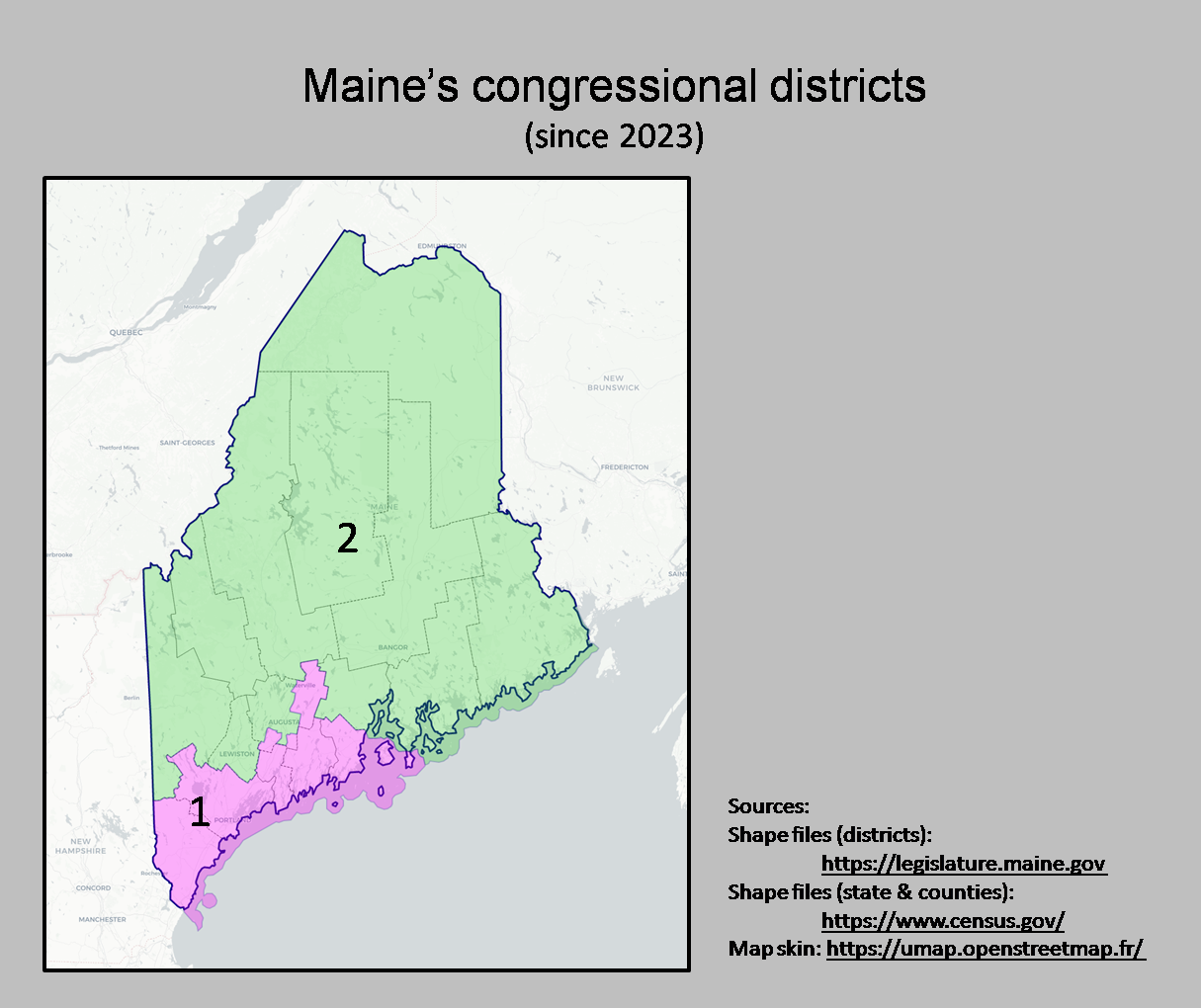
Maine's congressional districts since 2023 Interactive map version

Until 1820, Maine was part of Massachusetts. After the 1810 census, Massachusetts was allocated 20 districts. Seven Massachusetts districts (then numbered 14 through 20) were credited to Maine soon after it became a state in 1820. See District of Maine.

- At-large: 1820–1821, 1883–1885 (obsolete)
- 1st district: 1821–1883, 1885–present
- 2nd district: 1821–1883, 1885–present
- 3rd district: 1821–1883, 1885–1963 (obsolete since the 1960 census)
- 4th district: 1821–1883, 1885–1933 (obsolete since the 1930 census)
- 5th district: 1821–1883 (obsolete since the 1880 census)
- 6th district: 1821–1863 (obsolete since the 1860 census)
- 7th district: 1821–1853 (obsolete since the 1850 census)
- 8th district: 1833–1843 (obsolete since the 1840 census)

== Maryland ==
Maryland's congressional districts since 2023 Interactive map version

- At-large: 1963–1967 (obsolete)
- 1st district: 1789–present
- 2nd district: 1789–present
- 3rd district: 1789–present
- 4th district: 1789–present
- 5th district: 1789–present
- 6th district: 1789–1863, 1873–present
- 7th district: 1793–1843, 1953–present
- 8th district: 1793–1835, 1967–present

== Massachusetts ==
Massachusetts's congressional districts since 2023 Interactive map version

- At-large: 1793–1795 (obsolete)
- 1st district: 1789–present
- 2nd district: 1789–present
- 3rd district: 1789–present
- 4th district: 1789–present
- 5th district: 1789–1793, 1795–present
- 6th district: 1789–1793, 1795–present
- 7th district: 1789–1793, 1795–present
- 8th district: 1789–1793, 1795–present
- 9th district: 1795–present
- 10th district: 1795–2013 (obsolete since the 2010 census)
- 11th district: 1795–1843, 1853–1863, 1873–1993 (obsolete since the 1990 census)
- 12th district: 1795–1843, 1883–1983 (obsolete since the 1980 census)
- 13th district: 1795–1833, 1893–1963 (obsolete since the 1960 census)
- 14th district: 1795–1820 (moved to Maine), 1903–1963 (obsolete since the 1960 census)
- 15th district: 1803–1820 (moved to Maine), 1913–1943 (obsolete since the 1940 census)
- 16th district: 1803–1820 (moved to Maine), 1913–1933 (obsolete since the 1930 census)
- 17th district: 1803–1820 (obsolete since 1820 move to Maine (Note: Maine used to be part of Massachusetts. After the 1810 census, Massachusetts was allocated 20 districts. Seven districts (numbers 14 through 20) were credited to Maine soon after it became a state in 1820.))
- 18th district: 1813–1820 (obsolete since 1820 move to Maine)
- 19th district: 1813–1820 (obsolete since 1820 move to Maine)
- 20th district: 1813–1820 (obsolete since 1820 move to Maine)

== Michigan ==
Michigan's congressional districts since 2023 Interactive map version

- Territory: 1819–1837 (obsolete since statehood)
- At-large: 1837–1843, 1913–1915, 1963–1965 (obsolete)
- 1st district: 1843–present
- 2nd district: 1843–present
- 3rd district: 1843–present
- 4th district: 1853–present
- 5th district: 1863–present
- 6th district: 1863–present
- 7th district: 1873–present
- 8th district: 1873–present
- 9th district: 1873–present
- 10th district: 1883–present
- 11th district: 1883–present
- 12th district: 1893–present
- 13th district: 1915–present
- 14th district: 1933–2023 (obsolete since the 2020 census)
- 15th district: 1933–2013 (obsolete since the 2010 census)
- 16th district: 1933–2003 (obsolete since the 2000 census)
- 17th district: 1933–1993 (obsolete since the 1990 census)
- 18th district: 1953–1993 (obsolete since the 1990 census)
- 19th district: 1965–1983 (obsolete since the 1980 census)

== Minnesota ==
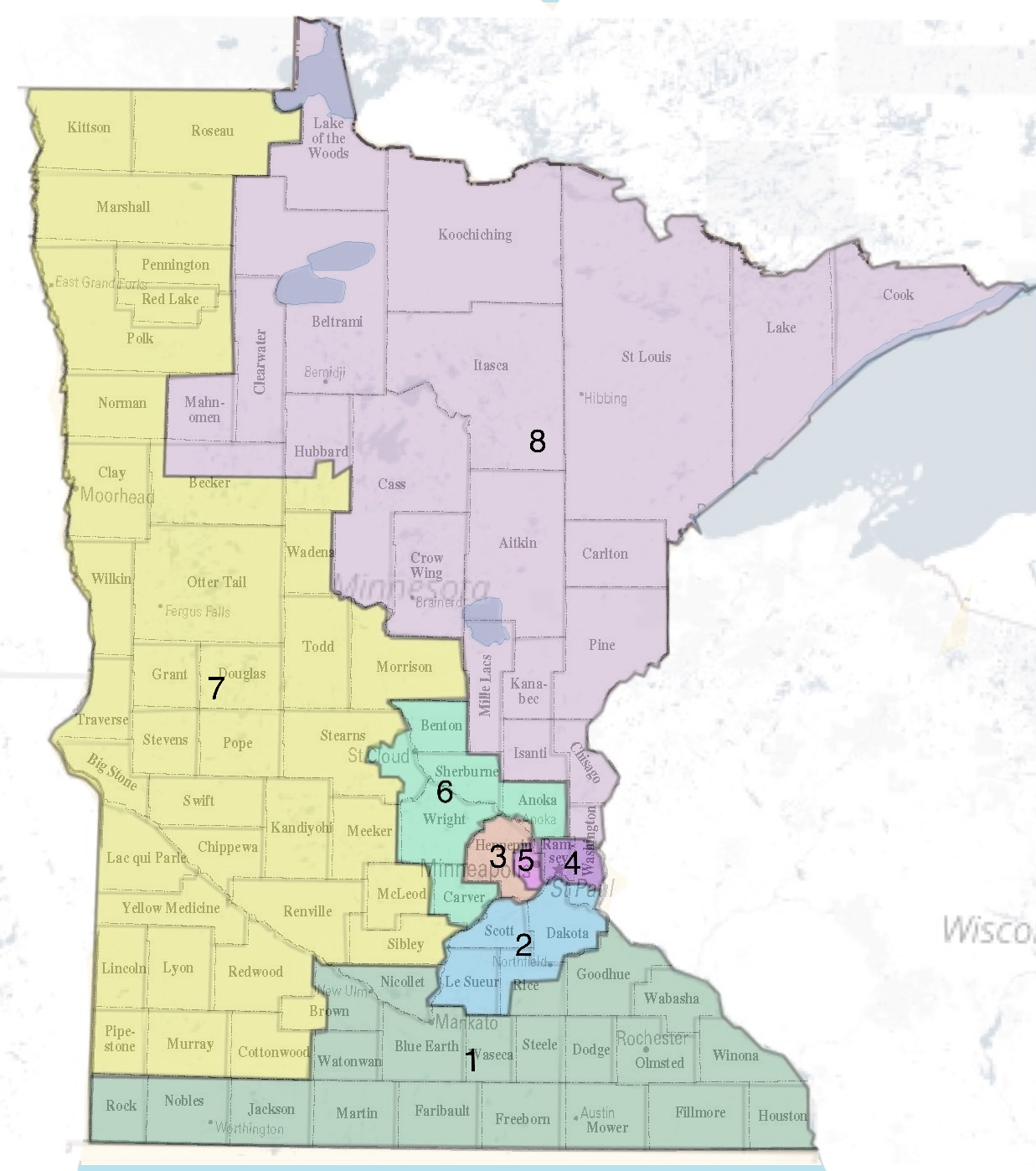
Minnesota's congressional districts since 2023 Interactive map version

- Territory: 1849–1858 (obsolete since statehood)
- At-large: 1858–1863, 1913–1915, 1933–1935 (obsolete)
- 1st district: 1863–1933, 1935–present
- 2nd district: 1863–1933, 1935–present
- 3rd district: 1873–1933, 1935–present
- 4th district: 1883–1933, 1935–present
- 5th district: 1883–1933, 1935–present
- 6th district: 1893–1933, 1935–present
- 7th district: 1893–1933, 1935–present
- 8th district: 1903–1933, 1935–present
- 9th district: 1903–1933, 1935–1963 (obsolete since the 1960 census)
- 10th district: 1915–1933 (obsolete since the 1930 census)

== Mississippi ==
Mississippi's congressional districts since 2023 Interactive map version

- Territory: 1801–1817 (obsolete since statehood)
- At-large: 1817–1847, 1853–1855 (obsolete)
- 1st district: 1847–present
- 2nd district: 1847–present
- 3rd district: 1847–present
- 4th district: 1847–present
- 5th district: 1855–2003 (obsolete since the 2000 census)
- 6th district: 1873–1963 (obsolete since the 1960 census)
- 7th district: 1883–1953 (obsolete since the 1950 census)
- 8th district: 1903–1933 (obsolete since the 1930 census)

== Missouri ==
Missouri's congressional districts from 2023 Interactive map version

- Territory: 1812–1821 (obsolete since statehood)
- At-large: 1821–1847, 1933–1935 (obsolete)
- 1st district: 1847–1933, 1935–present
- 2nd district: 1847–1933, 1935–present
- 3rd district: 1847–1933, 1935–present
- 4th district: 1847–1933, 1935–present
- 5th district: 1847–1933, 1935–present
- 6th district: 1853–1933, 1935–present
- 7th district: 1853–1933, 1935–present
- 8th district: 1863–1933, 1935–present
- 9th district: 1863–1933, 1935–2013 (obsolete since the 2010 census)
- 10th district: 1873–1933, 1935–1983 (obsolete since the 1980 census)
- 11th district: 1873–1933, 1935–1963 (obsolete since the 1960 census)
- 12th district: 1873–1933, 1935–1953 (obsolete since the 1950 census)
- 13th district: 1873–1933, 1935–1953 (obsolete since the 1950 census)
- 14th district: 1883–1933 (obsolete since the 1930 census)
- 15th district: 1893–1933 (obsolete since the 1930 census)
- 16th district: 1903–1933 (obsolete since the 1930 census)

== Montana ==
Montana's congressional districts since 2023 Interactive map version

- Territory: 1865–1889 (obsolete since statehood)
- At-large: 1889–1919, 1993–2023 (obsolete)
- 1st district: 1919–1993, 2023–present
- 2nd district: 1919–1993, 2023–present

== Nebraska ==
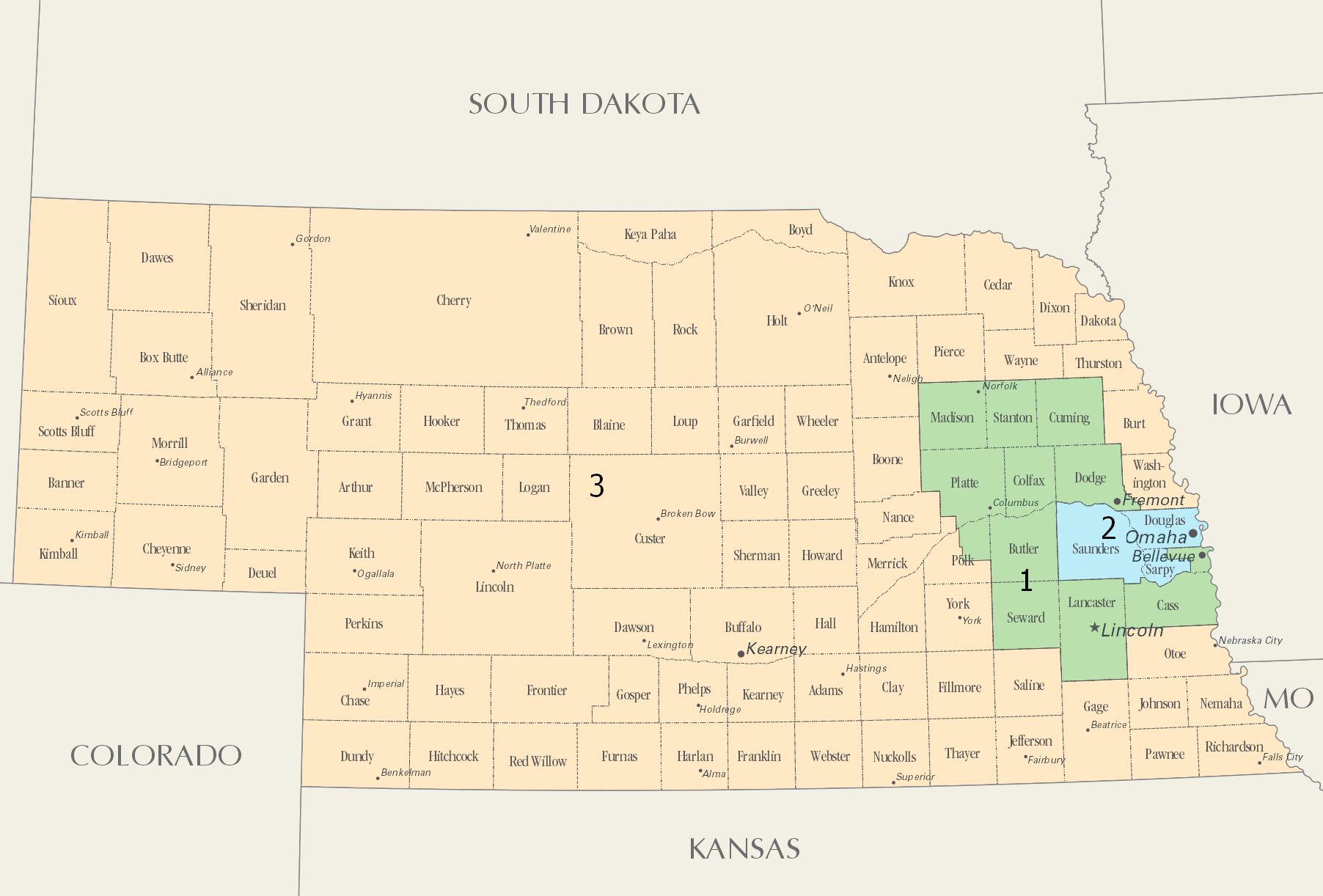
Nebraska's congressional districts since 2023 Interactive map version

- Territory: 1855–1867 (obsolete since statehood)
- At-large: 1867–1883 (obsolete)
- 1st district: 1883–present
- 2nd district: 1883–present
- 3rd district: 1883–present
- 4th district: 1893–1963 (obsolete since the 1960 census)
- 5th district: 1893–1943 (obsolete since the 1940 census)
- 6th district: 1893–1933 (obsolete since the 1930 census)

== Nevada ==
Nevada's congressional districts since 2023 Interactive map version

- Territory: 1861–1864 (obsolete since statehood)
- At-large: 1864–1983 (obsolete)
- 1st district: 1983–present
- 2nd district: 1983–present
- 3rd district: 2003–present
- 4th district: 2013–present

== New Hampshire ==
New Hampshire's congressional districts since 2023 Interactive map version

- At-large: 1789–1847 (obsolete)
- 1st district: 1847–present
- 2nd district: 1847–present
- 3rd district: 1847–1883 (obsolete since the 1880 census)
- 4th district: 1847–1853 (obsolete since the 1850 census)

== New Jersey ==
New Jersey's congressional districts since 2023 Interactive map version

- At-large: 1789–1799, 1801–1813, 1815–1843 (obsolete)
- 1st district: 1799–1801, 1813–1815, 1843–present
- 2nd district: 1799–1801, 1813–1815, 1843–present
- 3rd district: 1799–1801, 1813–1815, 1843–present
- 4th district: 1799–1801, 1843–present
- 5th district: 1799–1801, 1843–present
- 6th district: 1873–present
- 7th district: 1873–present
- 8th district: 1893–present
- 9th district: 1903–present
- 10th district: 1903–present
- 11th district: 1913–present
- 12th district: 1913–present
- 13th district: 1933–2013 (obsolete since the 2010 census)
- 14th district: 1933–1993 (obsolete since the 1990 census)
- 15th district: 1963–1983 (obsolete since the 1980 census)

== New Mexico ==
New Mexico's congressional districts since 2023 Interactive map version

- Territory: 1851–1912 (obsolete since statehood)
- At-large: 1912–1969 (obsolete)
- 1st district: 1969–present
- 2nd district: 1969–present
- 3rd district: 1983–present

== New York ==
New York's congressional districts since 2023 Interactive map version

- At-large: 1873–1875, 1883–1885, 1933–1945 (obsolete)
- 1st district: 1789–present
- 2nd district: 1789–present
- 3rd district: 1789–present
- 4th district: 1789–present
- 5th district: 1789–present
- 6th district: 1789–present
- 7th district: 1793–present
- 8th district: 1793–present
- 9th district: 1793–present
- 10th district: 1793–present
- 11th district: 1803–present
- 12th district: 1803–present
- 13th district: 1803–present
- 14th district: 1803–present
- 15th district: 1803–present
- 16th district: 1803–1809, 1813–present
- 17th district: 1803–1809, 1813–present
- 18th district: 1813–present
- 19th district: 1813–present
- 20th district: 1813–present
- 21st district: 1813–present
- 22nd district: 1821–present
- 23rd district: 1823–present
- 24th district: 1823–present
- 25th district: 1823–present
- 26th district: 1823–present
- 27th district: 1823–2023 (obsolete since the 2020 census)
- 28th district: 1823–2013 (obsolete since the 2010 census)
- 29th district: 1823–2013 (obsolete since the 2010 census)
- 30th district: 1823–2003 (obsolete since the 2000 census)
- 31st district: 1833–2003 (obsolete since the 2000 census)
- 32nd district: 1833–1863, 1873–1993 (obsolete since the 1990 census)
- 33rd district: 1833–1863, 1875–1993 (obsolete since the 1990 census)
- 34th district: 1843–1853, 1885–1993 (obsolete since the 1990 census)
- 35th district: 1903–1983 (obsolete since the 1980 census)
- 36th district: 1903–1983 (obsolete since the 1980 census)
- 37th district: 1903–1983 (obsolete since the 1980 census)
- 38th district: 1913–1983 (obsolete since the 1980 census)
- 39th district: 1913–1983 (obsolete since the 1980 census)
- 40th district: 1913–1973 (obsolete since the 1970 census)
- 41st district: 1913–1973 (obsolete since the 1970 census)
- 42nd district: 1913–1963 (obsolete since the 1960 census)
- 43rd district: 1913–1963 (obsolete since the 1960 census)
- 44th district: 1945–1953 (obsolete since the 1950 census)
- 45th district: 1945–1953 (obsolete since the 1950 census)

== North Carolina ==
North Carolina's congressional districts since 2025 Interactive map version

- At-large: 1883–1885 (obsolete)
- 1st district: 1789–present
- 2nd district: 1789–present
- 3rd district: 1789–present
- 4th district: 1789–present
- 5th district: 1789–present
- 6th district: 1793–present
- 7th district: 1793–present
- 8th district: 1793–1863, 1873–present
- 9th district: 1793–1853, 1885–present
- 10th district: 1793–1843, 1903–present
- 11th district: 1803–1843, 1933–present
- 12th district: 1803–1843, 1943–1963, 1993–present
- 13th district: 1813–1843, 2003–present
- 14th district: 2023–present

== North Dakota ==
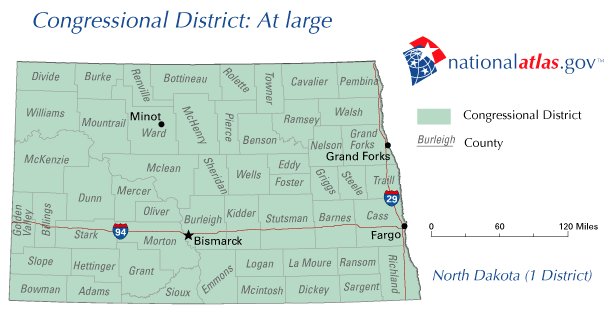
North Dakota's at-large district since 1973

- Dakota Territory: 1861–1889 (obsolete since statehood)
- At-large: 1889–1913, 1933–1963, 1973–present
- 1st district: 1913–1933, 1963–1973 (obsolete since the 1970 census)
- 2nd district: 1913–1933, 1963–1973 (obsolete since the 1970 census)
- 3rd district: 1913–1933 (obsolete since the 1930 census)

== Northern Mariana Islands ==
See Non-voting delegations, below.

== Ohio ==
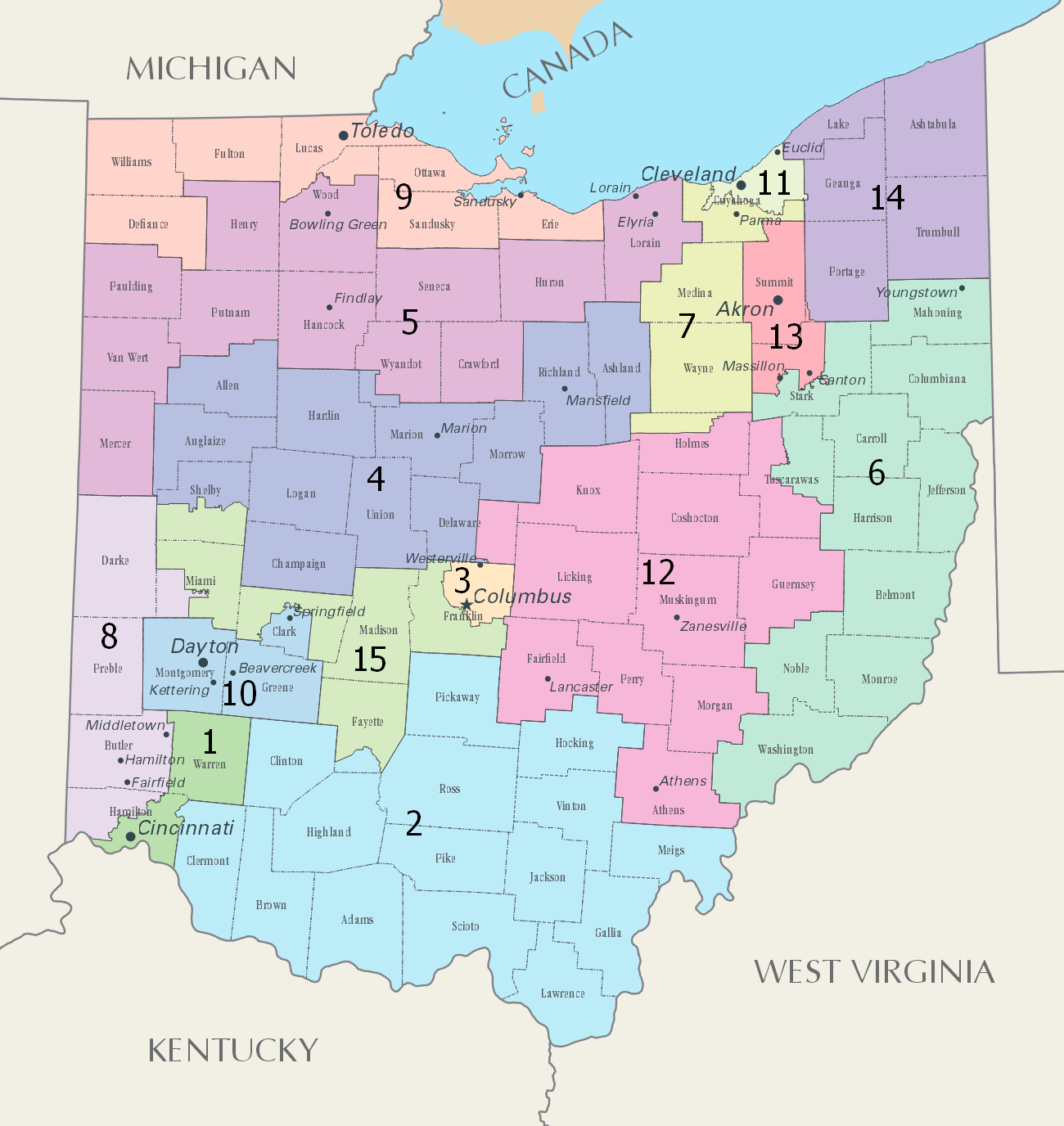
Ohio's congressional districts since 2023 Interactive map version

- Northwest Territory: 1799–1803 (obsolete since statehood)
- At-large: 1803–1813, 1913–1915, 1933–1953, 1963–1967 (obsolete)
- 1st district: 1813–present
- 2nd district: 1813–present
- 3rd district: 1813–present
- 4th district: 1813–present
- 5th district: 1813–present
- 6th district: 1813–present
- 7th district: 1823–present
- 8th district: 1823–present
- 9th district: 1823–present
- 10th district: 1823–present
- 11th district: 1823–present
- 12th district: 1823–present
- 13th district: 1823–present
- 14th district: 1823–present
- 15th district: 1833–present
- 16th district: 1833–2023 (obsolete since the 2020 census)
- 17th district: 1833–2013 (obsolete since the 2010 census)
- 18th district: 1833–2013 (obsolete since the 2010 census)
- 19th district: 1833–2003 (obsolete since the 2000 census)
- 20th district: 1843–1863, 1873–1993 (obsolete since the 1990 census)
- 21st district: 1843–1863, 1883–1993 (obsolete since the 1990 census)
- 22nd district: 1915–1983 (obsolete since the 1980 census)
- 23rd district: 1953–1983 (obsolete since the 1980 census)
- 24th district: 1967–1973 (obsolete since the 1970 census)

== Oklahoma ==
Oklahoma's congressional districts since 2023 Interactive map version

- Territory: 1890–1907 (obsolete since statehood)
- At-large: 1913–1915, 1933–1943 (obsolete)
- 1st district: 1907–present
- 2nd district: 1907–present
- 3rd district: 1907–present
- 4th district: 1907–present
- 5th district: 1907–present
- 6th district: 1915–2003 (obsolete since the 2000 census)
- 7th district: 1915–1953 (obsolete since the 1950 census)
- 8th district: 1915–1953 (obsolete since the 1950 census)

== Oregon ==
Oregon's congressional districts since 2023 Interactive map version

- Territory: 1849–1859 (obsolete since statehood)
- At-large: 1859–1893 (obsolete)
- 1st district: 1893–present
- 2nd district: 1893–present
- 3rd district: 1913–present
- 4th district: 1943–present
- 5th district: 1983–present
- 6th district: 2023–present

== Pennsylvania ==
Pennsylvania's congressional districts since 2023 Interactive map version

- At-large: 1789–1791, 1793–1795, 1873–1875, 1883–1889, 1893–1903, 1913–1923, 1943–1945 (obsolete)
- 1st district: 1791–1793, 1795–present
- 2nd district: 1791–1793, 1795–present
- 3rd district: 1791–1793, 1795–present
- 4th district: 1791–1793, 1795–present
- 5th district: 1791–1793, 1795–present
- 6th district: 1791–1793, 1795–present
- 7th district: 1791–1793, 1795–present
- 8th district: 1791–1793, 1795–present
- 9th district: 1795–present
- 10th district: 1795–present
- 11th district: 1795–present
- 12th district: 1795–1803, 1813–present
- 13th district: 1813–present
- 14th district: 1813–present
- 15th district: 1813–present
- 16th district: 1823–present
- 17th district: 1823–present
- 18th district: 1823–2023 (obsolete since the 2020 census)
- 19th district: 1833–2013 (obsolete since the 2010 census)
- 20th district: 1833–2003 (obsolete since the 2000 census)
- 21st district: 1833–2003 (obsolete since the 2000 census)
- 22nd district: 1833–1993 (obsolete since the 1990 census)
- 23rd district: 1833–1993 (obsolete since the 1990 census)
- 24th district: 1833–1983 (obsolete since the 1980 census)
- 25th district: 1833–1843, 1853–1863, 1875–1983 (obsolete since the 1980 census)
- 26th district: 1875–1973 (obsolete since the 1970 census)
- 27th district: 1875–1973 (obsolete since the 1970 census)
- 28th district: 1889–1963 (obsolete since the 1960 census)
- 29th district: 1903–1963 (obsolete since the 1960 census)
- 30th district: 1903–1963 (obsolete since the 1960 census)
- 31st district: 1903–1953 (obsolete since the 1950 census)
- 32nd district: 1903–1953 (obsolete since the 1950 census)
- 33rd district: 1923–1953 (obsolete since the 1950 census)
- 34th district: 1923–1943 (obsolete since the 1940 census)
- 35th district: 1923–1933 (obsolete since the 1930 census)
- 36th district: 1923–1933 (obsolete since the 1930 census)

== Puerto Rico ==
See Non-voting delegations, below.

== Rhode Island ==
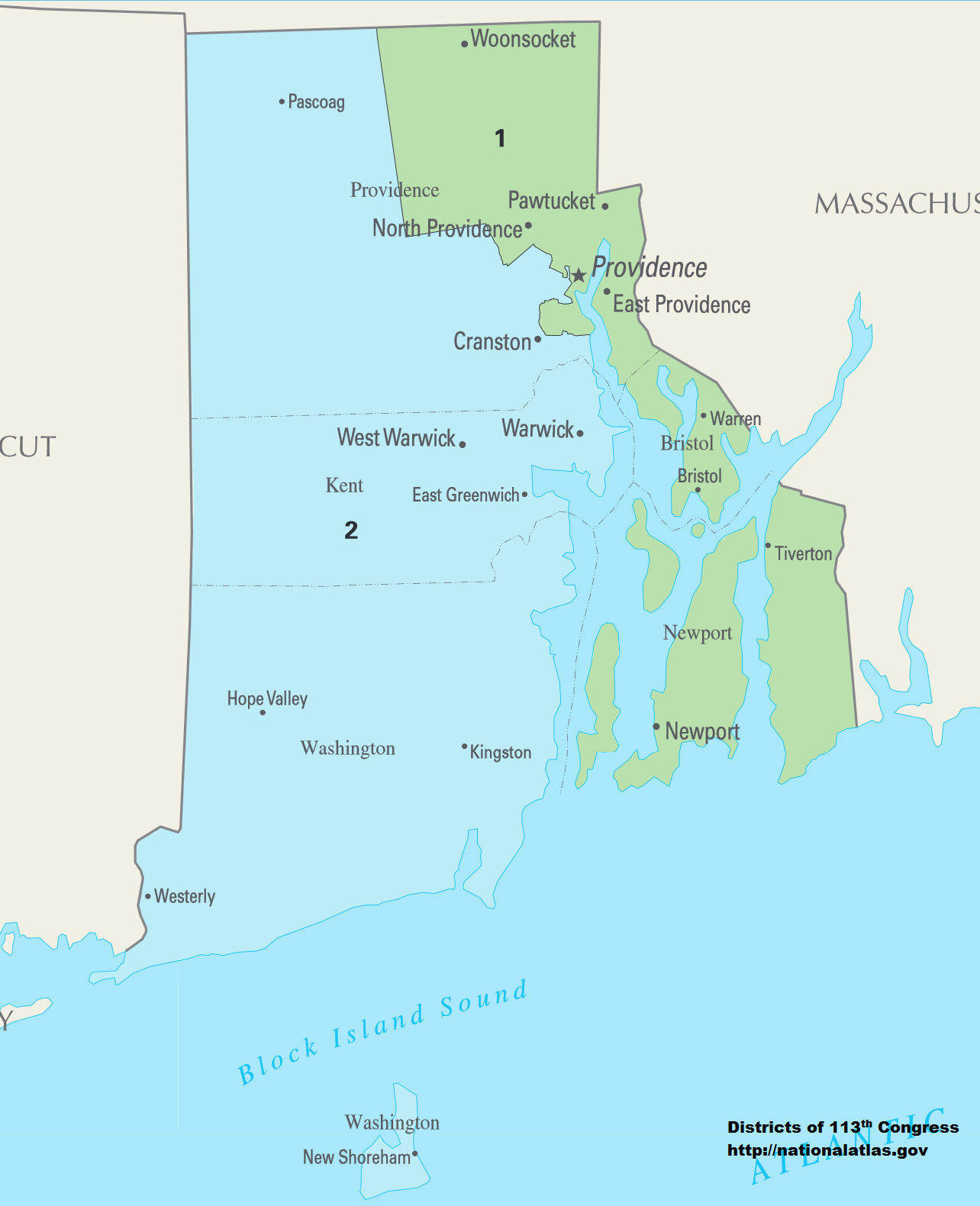
Rhode Island's congressional districts since 2013 Interactive map version

- At-large: 1790–1843 (obsolete)
- 1st district: 1843–present
- 2nd district: 1843–present
- 3rd district: 1913–1933 (obsolete since the 1930 census)

== South Carolina ==
South Carolina's congressional districts since 2023 Interactive map version

- At-large: 1873–1875 (obsolete)
- 1st district: 1789–present
- 2nd district: 1789–present
- 3rd district: 1789–present
- 4th district: 1789–present
- 5th district: 1789–1863, 1875–present
- 6th district: 1793–1863, 1883–present
- 7th district: 1803–1853, 1883–1933, 2013–present
- 8th district: 1803–1843 (obsolete since the 1840 census)
- 9th district: 1813–1843 (obsolete since the 1840 census)

== South Dakota ==
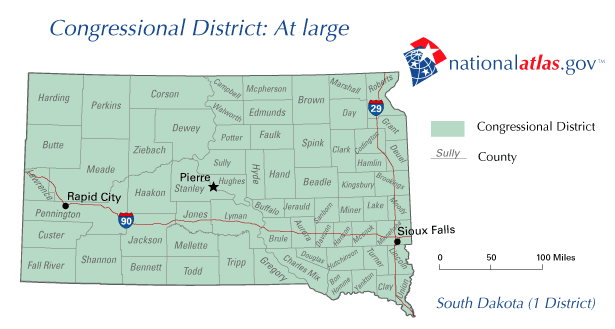
South Dakota's at-large district since 1983

- Dakota Territory 1861–1889 (obsolete since statehood)
- At-large: 1889–1913, 1983–present
- 1st district: 1913–1983 (obsolete since the 1980 census)
- 2nd district: 1913–1983 (obsolete since the 1980 census)
- 3rd district: 1913–1933 (obsolete since the 1930 census)

== Tennessee ==
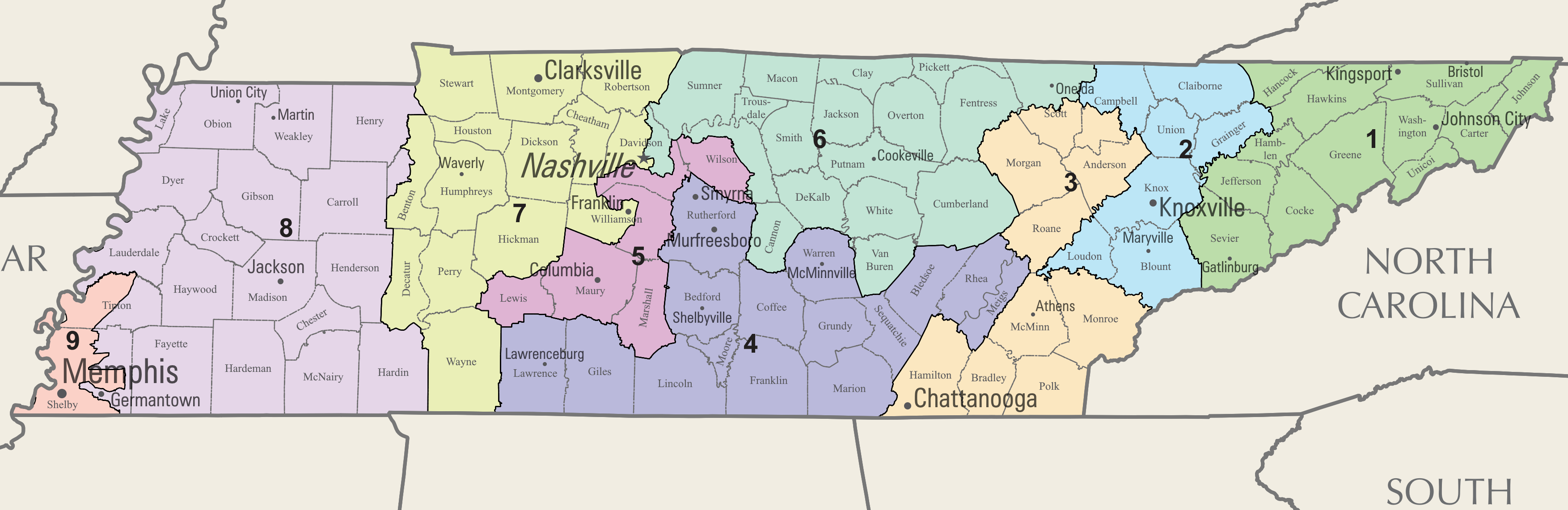
Tennessee's congressional districts since 2023 Interactive map version

- Southwest Territory: 1794–1796 (obsolete since statehood)
- At-large: 1796–1805, 1873–1875 (obsolete)
- 1st district: 1805–present
- 2nd district: 1805–present
- 3rd district: 1805–present
- 4th district: 1813–present
- 5th district: 1813–present
- 6th district: 1813–present
- 7th district: 1823–present
- 8th district: 1823–present
- 9th district: 1823–1863, 1873–1973, 1983–present
- 10th district: 1833–1863, 1875–1933, 1943–1953 (obsolete since the 1950 census)
- 11th district: 1833–1853 (obsolete since the 1850 census)
- 12th district: 1833–1843 (obsolete since the 1840 census)
- 13th district: 1833–1843 (obsolete since the 1840 census)

== Texas ==
Texas's congressional districts since 2023 Interactive map version

- At-large: 1873–1875, 1913–1919, 1933–1935, 1953–1959, 1963–1967 (obsolete)
- 1st district: 1845–present
- 2nd district: 1845–present
- 3rd district: 1863–present
- 4th district: 1863–present
- 5th district: 1875–present
- 6th district: 1875–present
- 7th district: 1883–present
- 8th district: 1883–present
- 9th district: 1883–present
- 10th district: 1883–present
- 11th district: 1883–present
- 12th district: 1893–present
- 13th district: 1893–present
- 14th district: 1903–present
- 15th district: 1903–present
- 16th district: 1903–present
- 17th district: 1919–present
- 18th district: 1919–present
- 19th district: 1935–present
- 20th district: 1935–present
- 21st district: 1935–present
- 22nd district: 1959–present
- 23rd district: 1967–present
- 24th district: 1973–present
- 25th district: 1983–present
- 26th district: 1983–present
- 27th district: 1983–present
- 28th district: 1993–present
- 29th district: 1993–present
- 30th district: 1993–present
- 31st district: 2003–present
- 32nd district: 2003–present
- 33rd district: 2013–present
- 34th district: 2013–present
- 35th district: 2013–present
- 36th district: 2013–present
- 37th district: 2023–present
- 38th district: 2023–present

== U.S. Virgin Islands ==
See Non-voting delegations, below.

== Utah ==
Utah's congressional districts since 2023 Interactive map version

- Territory: 1851–1896 (obsolete since statehood)
- At-large: 1896–1913 (obsolete)
- 1st district: 1913–present
- 2nd district: 1913–present
- 3rd district: 1983–present
- 4th district: 2013–present

== Vermont ==
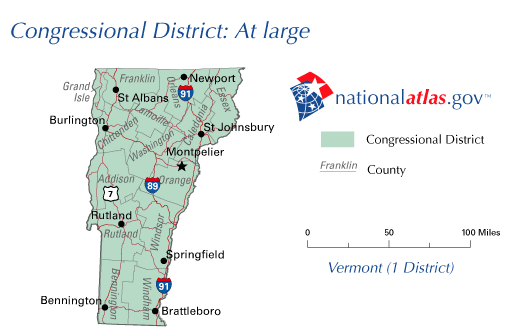
Vermont's at-large district since 1933

- At-large: 1813–1821, 1823–1825, 1933–present
- 1st district: 1791–1813, 1821–1823, 1825–1933 (obsolete since the 1930 census)
- 2nd district: 1791–1813, 1821–1823, 1825–1933 (obsolete since the 1930 census)
- 3rd district: 1803–1813, 1821–1823, 1825–1883 (obsolete since the 1880 census)
- 4th district: 1803–1813, 1821–1823, 1825–1853 (obsolete since the 1850 census)
- 5th district: 1821–1823, 1825–1843 (obsolete since the 1840 census)
- 6th district: 1821–1823 (obsolete since the 1820 census)

== Virginia ==
Virginia's congressional districts since 2023 Interactive map version

- At-large: 1883–1885, 1933–1935 (obsolete)
- 1st district: 1789–1933, 1935–present
- 2nd district: 1789–1933, 1935–present
- 3rd district: 1789–1933, 1935–present
- 4th district: 1789–1933, 1935–present
- 5th district: 1789–1933, 1935–present
- 6th district: 1789–1933, 1935–present
- 7th district: 1789–1933, 1935–present
- 8th district: 1789–1933, 1935–present
- 9th district: 1789–1863, 1873–1933, 1935–present
- 10th district: 1789–1863, 1885–1933, 1953–present
- 11th district: 1793–1863, 1993–present
- 12th district: 1793–1863 (obsolete since the 1863 move to West Virginia)
- 13th district: 1793–1863 (obsolete since the 1863 move to West Virginia)
- 14th district: 1793–1853 (obsolete since the 1850 census)
- 15th district: 1793–1853 (obsolete since the 1850 census)
- 16th district: 1793–1843 (obsolete since the 1840 census)
- 17th district: 1793–1843 (obsolete since the 1840 census)
- 18th district: 1793–1843 (obsolete since the 1840 census)
- 19th district: 1793–1843 (obsolete since the 1840 census)
- 20th district: 1803–1843 (obsolete since the 1840 census)
- 21st district: 1803–1843 (obsolete since the 1840 census)
- 22nd district: 1803–1833 (obsolete since the 1830 census)
- 23rd district: 1813–1823 (obsolete since the 1820 census)

== Washington ==
Washington's congressional districts since 2023 Interactive map version

- Territory: 1854–1889 (obsolete since statehood)
- At-large: 1889–1909, 1913–1915, 1953–1959 (obsolete)
- 1st district: 1909–present
- 2nd district: 1909–present
- 3rd district: 1909–present
- 4th district: 1915–present
- 5th district: 1915–present
- 6th district: 1933–present
- 7th district: 1959–present
- 8th district: 1983–present
- 9th district: 1993–present
- 10th district: 2013–present

== West Virginia ==
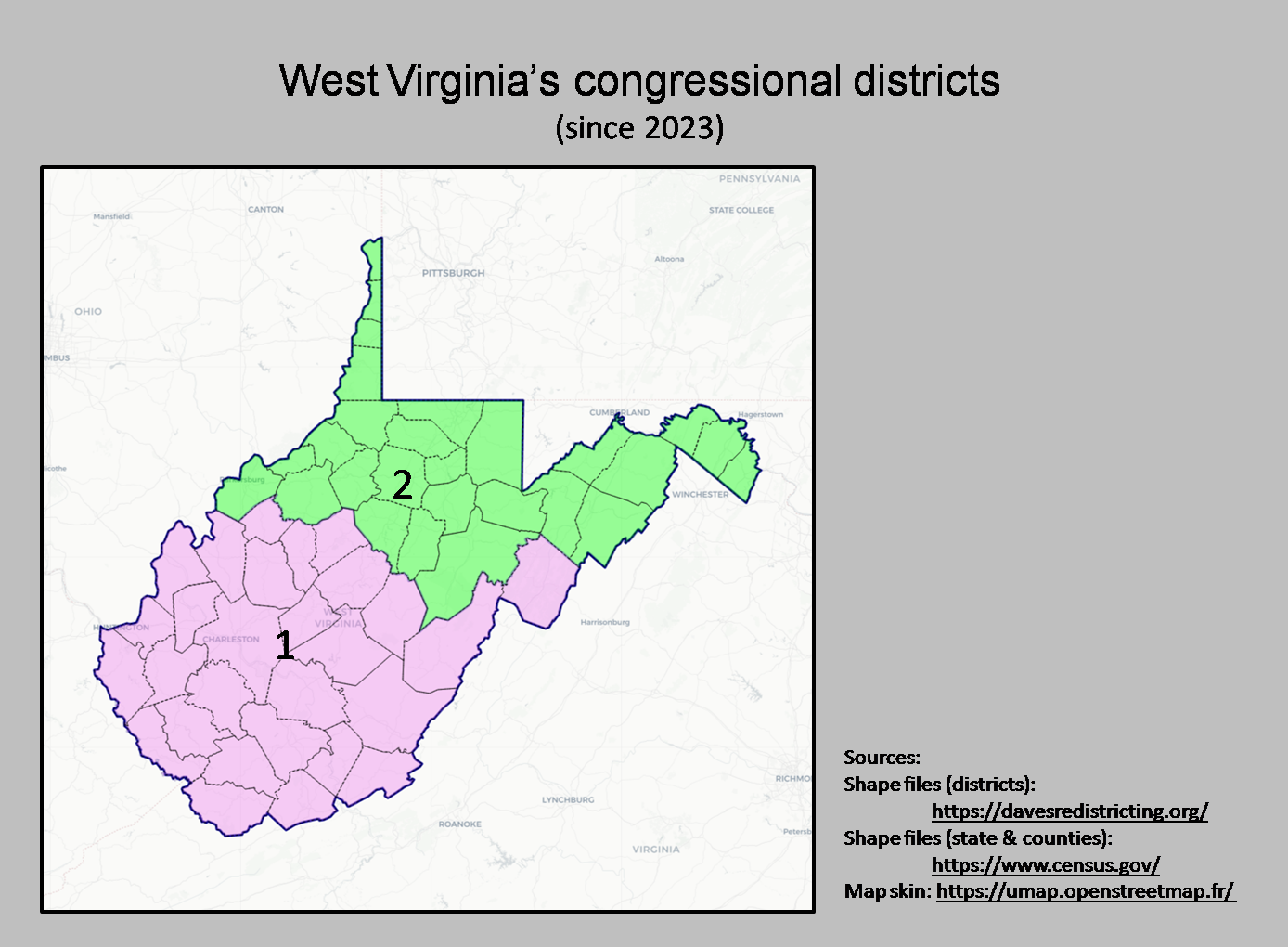
West Virginia's congressional districts since 2023 Interactive map version

- At-large: 1913–1917 (obsolete)
- 1st district: 1863–present
- 2nd district: 1863–present
- 3rd district: 1863–2023 (obsolete since the 2020 census)
- 4th district: 1883–1993 (obsolete since the 1990 census)
- 5th district: 1903–1973 (obsolete since the 1970 census)
- 6th district: 1917–1963 (obsolete since the 1960 census)

== Wisconsin ==
Map of Wisconsin's congressional districts from 2023 Interactive map version

- 1st district: 1848–present
- 2nd district: 1848–present
- 3rd district: 1849–present
- 4th district: 1863–present
- 5th district: 1863–present
- 6th district: 1863–present
- 7th district: 1873–present
- 8th district: 1873–present
- 9th district: 1883–2003 (obsolete since the 2000 census)
- 10th district: 1893–1973 (obsolete since the 1970 census)
- 11th district: 1903–1933 (obsolete since the 1930 census)

== Wyoming ==
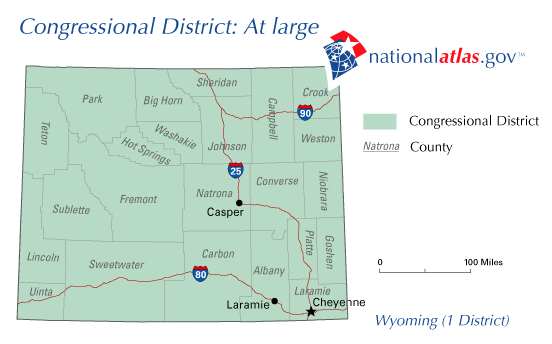
Wyoming's at-large district since 1869

- Territory: 1869–1890 (obsolete since statehood)
- At-large: 1890–present

== Non-voting delegations ==
- American Samoa, 1978–present
- Cherokee Nation, 1835 and 2019–present (yet to be seated) (Cherokee delegate)
- Choctaw Nation, 1830 (never seated)
- District of Columbia, 1871–1875 and 1971–present
- Guam, 1970–present
- Northern Mariana Islands, 2009–present
- Philippines, 1907–1946 (obsolete since independence)
- Puerto Rico, 1901–present
- United States Virgin Islands, 1970–present

== See also ==
- List of current United States representatives
- Seniority in the United States House of Representatives
- United States congressional district
- Apportionment
  - United States congressional apportionment
- General ticket
- Redistricting
  - Apportionment paradox
  - Gerrymandering
  - Voting Rights Act
- Representation
- United States Census Bureau
- Better Know a District: A recurring segment on The Colbert Report, in which Stephen Colbert profiled a congressional district and interviewed its representative. Described by Colbert as a "435-part series".

=== Comparisons ===
- Constituency
- Australia
- Canada
- European Parliament
- France
- Ireland
- New Zealand
- Philippines
- Singapore: Group representation constituency, Non-constituency Member of Parliament
- United Kingdom

== Sources ==
- "United States Census 2010". U.S. Census Bureau.
- Martis, Kenneth C. (1989). The Historical Atlas of Political Parties in the United States Congress, 1789–1989. Macmillan Publishing. ISBN 0029201705.
