= John Clopton =

American politician (1756–1816)

Member of the U.S. House of Representatives from Virginia
- In office March 4, 1795 – March 3, 1799
- Preceded by: Samuel Griffin
- Succeeded by: John Marshall
- Constituency: 13th district
- In office March 4, 1801 – September 11, 1816
- Preceded by: Littleton Tazewell (13th); District established (22nd, 23rd)
- Succeeded by: John J. Trigg (13th); Hugh Nelson (22nd); John Tyler (23rd)
- Constituency: 13th district (1801-03); 22nd district (1803-13); 23rd district (1813-16)

Member of the Virginia House of Delegates from New Kent County
- In office October 19, 1789 – October 1, 1792
- Preceded by: John Dandridge
- Succeeded by: John Dandridge

Personal details
- Born: February 7, 1756 New Kent County, Colony of Virginia, British America
- Died: September 11, 1816 (aged 60) New Kent, Virginia, U.S.
- Party: Democratic-Republican
- Spouse: Sarah Bacon
- Education: College of Philadelphia

Military service
- Allegiance: United States
- Branch/service: Virginia Militia
- Rank: Captain
- Battles/wars: American Revolutionary War

John Clopton (February 7, 1756 – September 11, 1816) was a Virginia lawyer, patriot and politician who served as a military officer in the American Revolutionary War, and later in the Virginia House of Delegates and United States House of Representatives.

== Early life and education ==
John Clopton was born in St. Peter's Parish, near Tunstall, New Kent County in the Colony of Virginia on February 7, 1756. His mother was Elizabeth Dorrell Ford (1727–1785), whose brother was Rev. Reuben Ford. His father was William Clopton (1718–1798), descended from the 17th century William Clopton who emigrated from Warwickshire or Suffolk in England to York County, then married the daughter of York County's clerk of court and moved sometime after 1683 to New Kent County. This John Clopton studied law and graduated from the College of Philadelphia (now the University of Pennsylvania) in 1773.

== Military service ==
Upon returning to Virginia, Clopton served in the New Kent County militia with many of his relatives, and his father furnished them with supplies and clothing. He held the rank of lieutenant and refused promotion to captain because such would require transfer to another unit. During the American Revolutionary War Clopton was wounded at the Battle of Brandywine.

== Career ==
Upon being admitted to the bar, Clopton practiced law in New Kent County and surrounding areas. In the 1787 Virginia tax census, Clopton paid taxes in New Kent County for owning three enslaved teenaged Blacks and two Black adults, as well as four horses and 11 cattle, and his father also paid taxes, for about double that number of slaves. New Kent County voters elected Clopton as one of their representatives in the Virginia House of Delegates in 1789 and re-elected him twice, so he served until 1791, first alongside veteran legislator Burwell Bassett, then John Hockaday and finally William Chamberlayne.

Voters from Virginia's 13th congressional district elected Clopton as a Democratic-Republican to the Fourth and Fifth Congresses, and he served from March 4, 1795, to March 3, 1799. Clopton then served as a member of the Virginia Privy Council from 1799 to 1801.

Voters from New Kent and surrounding areas then elected Clopton to the Seventh and to the seven succeeding Congresses, so he served from March 4, 1801, until his death in office in 1816 (albeit back home in Virginia, and with the congressional district changing due to census-based reapportionment from Virginia's 22nd congressional district to Virginia's 23rd congressional district). During the Tenth Congress, Clopton was chairman of the Committee on Revisal and Unfinished Business. A leading proponent of strict constructionist views in the House, Clopton was one of the few representatives who opposed the Second Bank of the United States on constitutional grounds.

== Personal life ==
He married Sarah Bacon on May 15, 1784, daughter of Edmund Bacon and Elizabeth Edloe. They had several children: Izard (1785–?), Maria L. Adelaide (1788–?), John Bacon (1789–1860), William Edmund (1791–1848), and Sarah Elizabeth (1804–1843).

== Death and legacy ==
Clopton died near Tunstall on September 11, 1816; interment was in the family burying ground on his plantation. Future President John Tyler was elected to fill the vacancy caused by Clopton's death.

== See also ==
- List of members of the United States Congress who died in office (1790–1899)

U.S. House of Representatives
Preceded by Samuel Griffin	Member of the U.S. House of Representatives from Virginia's 13th congressional district 1795–1799	Succeeded by John Marshall
Preceded by Littleton W. Tazewell	Member of the U.S. House of Representatives from Virginia's 13th congressional district 1801–1803	Succeeded by John J. Trigg
Preceded by District created	Member of the U.S. House of Representatives from Virginia's 22nd congressional district 1803–1813	Succeeded by Hugh Nelson
Preceded by District created	Member of the U.S. House of Representatives from Virginia's 23rd congressional district 1813–1816	Succeeded by John Tyler
