= James Parker (Massachusetts politician) =

American politician (1768–1837)

Member of the U.S. House of Representatives from Massachusetts
- In office March 4, 1813 – March 3, 1815
- Preceded by: new seat
- Succeeded by: Samuel S. Conner
- Constituency: 19th district
- In office March 4, 1819 – March 3, 1821
- Preceded by: Thomas Rice
- Succeeded by: 18th District eliminated in 1820
- Constituency: 18th district

Personal details
- Born: 1768 Boston, Province of Massachusetts Bay, British America
- Died: November 9, 1837 (aged 68–69) Gardiner, Maine, U.S.
- Party: Democratic-Republican
- Occupation: Physician

James Parker (1768 – November 9, 1837) was an American politician.

Parker was born and educated in Boston in the Province of Massachusetts Bay. He studied medicine, became a doctor, and started a practice in Gardiner in Massachusetts' District of Maine.

In addition to practicing medicine, Parker was an inventor, and received a patent for an improved brick and tile making process.

Active in politics as a Democratic-Republican, he served in the Massachusetts State Senate from 1811 to 1812. Parker represented Massachusetts's 19th district in the United States House of Representatives from 1813 to 1815, and the 18th district from 1819 to 1821.

In 1824 Parker was chosen as a presidential elector pledged to support John Quincy Adams.

Parker died in Gardiner on November 9, 1837, and was buried at Gardiner's Oak Grove Cemetery.

== Sources ==
- United States Congress. "James Parker (id: P000060)". Biographical Directory of the United States Congress.

U.S. House of Representatives
Preceded by None; district created.	Member of the U.S. House of Representatives from Massachusetts's 19th congressional district March 4, 1813 – March 3, 1815	Succeeded by Samuel S. Conner
Preceded by Thomas Rice	Member of the U.S. House of Representatives from Massachusetts's 18th congressional district March 4, 1819 – March 3, 1821	Succeeded by None; Maine District split
