= Thomas Rice (Massachusetts politician, born 1768) =

American politician

Member of the U.S. House of Representatives from Massachusetts's 18th district
- In office March 4, 1815 – March 3, 1819
- Preceded by: John Wilson
- Succeeded by: James Parker

Member of the Massachusetts House of Representatives
- In office 1814–1814

Personal details
- Born: March 30, 1768 Pownalborough, Massachusetts Bay, British America (now Wiscasset, Maine)
- Died: June 23, 1832 (aged 64) Winslow, Maine, U.S.
- Resting place: Pine Grove Cemetery, Waterville, Maine
- Party: Federalist
- Spouse(s): Sarah Swan, d. September 26, 1840; Susanna Greene m. February 16, 1841, d. December 1, 1879.
- Children: Thomas Rice, III., Rebecca Rice (Parker)
- Education: Harvard
- Profession: Attorney

Thomas Rice (March 30, 1768 – August 25, 1854) was a U.S. representative from Massachusetts.

Thomas Rice was born March 30, 1768, in Pownalborough in the Province of Massachusetts Bay (now known as Wiscasset, Maine), to Thomas Rice and Rebecca (Kingsbury) Rice. He graduated from Harvard University in 1791. He studied law and was admitted to the bar in Suffolk County, Massachusetts, in 1794 and commenced practice in Winslow in Massachusetts' District of Maine, the following year. Thomas Rice married Sarah Swan on October 22, 1796. He was appointed in 1807 by the supreme judicial court of Maine one of the examiners of counselors and attorneys for Kennebec County. He served as member of the Massachusetts House of Representatives in 1814.

Rice was elected as a Federalist to the Fourteenth and Fifteenth Congresses (March 4, 1815 – March 3, 1819). He was an unsuccessful candidate for reelection in 1818 to the Sixteenth Congress. He resumed the practice of law. After Sarah Swan Rice died September 26, 1840, Rice remarried to Susanna Greene, daughter of Col R. H. Greene, on February 16, 1841, at Winslow, Maine. To this marriage, he had a son, Thomas III, who was born in 1843. He died in Winslow, Maine, on August 25, 1854. He was interred at Pine Grove Cemetery, Waterville, Maine.

Thomas Rice was a direct descendant of Edmund Rice an early immigrant to Massachusetts Bay Colony as follows:

- Thomas Rice, son of

- Thomas Rice (November 27, 1734 - April 21, 1812), son of
- Noah Rice (1705 - Feb 1759), son of

- Thomas Rice (30 Jun 1654 - 1747), son of
- Thomas Rice (26 Jan 1625 - 16 Nov 1681), son of

- Edmund Rice (1594 - 3 May 1663)

== Sources ==
- United States Congress. "Thomas Rice (id: R000204)". Biographical Directory of the United States Congress.

U.S. House of Representatives
Preceded by John Wilson	Member of the U.S. House of Representatives from Massachusetts's 18th congressional district March 4, 1815-March 3, 1819	Succeeded by James Parker
Political offices
Preceded by	Member of the Massachusetts House of Representatives; 1814– 1814	Succeeded by
