= Samuel S. Conner =

American politician

Samuel Shepard Conner

Member of the U.S. House of Representatives from Massachusetts's 19th district
- In office March 4, 1815 – March 3, 1817
- Preceded by: James Parker
- Succeeded by: Joshua Gage

Personal details
- Born: c. 1783 Exeter, New Hampshire
- Died: December 17, 1820 (aged 36–37) Covington, Kentucky
- Party: Democratic-Republican
- Spouse: Elizabeth Denniston
- Education: Phillips Exeter Academy, Yale College
- Profession: Attorney

Military service
- Allegiance: United States
- Branch/service: United States Army
- Years of service: March 12, 1812-July 14, 1814
- Rank: Lieutenant colonel
- Commands: Twenty-first Infantry; Thirteenth Infantry
- Battles/wars: War of 1812; Battle of York

Samuel Shepard Conner (c. 1783 – December 17, 1820) was a U.S. representative from Massachusetts.

Born in Exeter, New Hampshire, Conner attended Phillips Exeter Academy in 1794. He was graduated from Yale College in 1806. He studied law.

Conner married Elizabeth Denniston of Albany, New York. He was admitted to the bar and commenced practice in Waterville, Maine (at that time a district of Massachusetts), in 1810. Conner served in the War of 1812. Conner was first a major of the Twenty-first Infantry. In the beginning of 1813 Conner served as aide-de-camp to General Henry Dearborn. He was one of the American officers who accepted the British surrender at the Battle of York. He was promoted to lieutenant colonel of the Thirteenth Infantry March 12, 1813. He resigned July 14, 1814. He resumed the practice of law in Waterville, Maine.

Conner was elected as a Democratic-Republican to the Fourteenth Congress (March 4, 1815 – March 3, 1817). He was appointed surveyor general of the Ohio land district in 1819. He died in Covington, Kentucky, December 17, 1820.

== Sources ==
- United States Congress. "Samuel S. Conner (id: C000692)". Biographical Directory of the United States Congress.

U.S. House of Representatives
| Preceded by James Parker | Member of the U.S. House of Representatives from Massachusetts's 19th congressional district March 4, 1815 - March 3, 1817 | Succeeded by Joshua Gage |
Military offices
| Preceded by | Major of the Twenty-first Infantry; March 12, 1812 – March 12, 1813 | Succeeded by John Johnson |
| Preceded by | Aide-de-camp to General Henry Dearborn; 1813 – 1813 | Succeeded by |
| Preceded by John Christie | Lieutenant colonel of the Thirteenth Infantry; March 12, 1813– July 14, 1814 | Succeeded by R. N. Malcolm |
