= William Chamberlayne (burgess) =

American lawyer and politician (d. 1736)

Member of the Virginia House of Burgesses from New Kent County
- In office 1728–1736 Serving with Richard Richardson, William Bassett (burgess), Mr. Bacon
- Succeeded by: Mr. Doran
- Preceded by: John Thornton

Personal details
- Born: Hereford, England
- Died: New Kent County, Colony of Virginia
- Spouse: Elizabeth Littlepage
- Relations: William Chamberlayne (soldier), William Byrd Chamberlayne (grandsons)
- Children: Thomas Chamberlayne, Jr.,
- Occupation: planter, merchant, politician

William Chamberlayne (died circa 1736) emigrated from England to the Virginia colony, where he became a merchant, planter and politician in New Kent County, which he represented in the House of Burgesses for multiple terms. Complicating matters, several descendants shared the same name as their emigrant ancestor, including two members of the Virginia House of Delegates following the Revolutionary War, a Confederate States Army officer and U.S.Army officer.

Chamberlayne emigrated from Hereford, England. He married Elizabeth Littlepage, daughter of Richard Littlepage, who had represented New Kent County in the House of Burgesses in 1685–1686. They had children, including sons Thomas Chamberlayne whose son William Byrd Chamberlayne would also serve in the Virginia General Assembly, and Richard whose some William Chamberlayne would serve in both houses of the Virginia General Assembly as well as in the Continental Army during the American Revolutionary War and led Virginia militiaman as Brigadier General during the War of 1812. Their cousin Byrd Chamberlayne served as a naval lieutenant during the Revolutionary war and was lost at sea with his son Otway Byrd Chamberlayne in 1799.

Chamberlayne became a merchant in New Kent County, and then a large landowner. The family's main plantation was "Poplar Grove"

New Kent County voters twice elected Chamberlayne as one of their representatives in the House of Burgesses, although he died before his second term began and was succeeded by Mr. Doran.

A memorial plaque at St. Peter's Church in New Kent County honors his service.
