= Thomas Rice (Massachusetts politician, born 1734) =

American politician

Thomas Rice (November 27, 1734 – April 21, 1812) was a Massachusetts state legislator and judge prior to and after the American Revolution. He was a physician, educator and clergyman active in Federalist Party politics serving as a presidential elector in the 1792, 1796 and 1800 elections.

== Biography ==
Thomas Rice was born November 27, 1734, to Noah Rice and Hannah (Warren) Rice in Westborough, Province of Massachusetts. He graduated in 1756 from Harvard University studying medicine. Thomas Rice married Rebecca Kingsbury on January 16, 1767, in Westborough. He resided at Pownalborough in Maine, now known as Wiscasset, was a practicing physician and he was elected as a town selectman in 1776. In addition to elective office, Rice was appointed as a Justice of the Peace in 1764 in Pownalborough and as Judge in the Court of Common Pleas for Lincoln County, serving from 1763 to 1774. He was also a clergyman and teacher.

Rice served as a member of the Massachusetts House of Representatives in 1775 and 1776 and was a member of the 1779 State convention that, on the part of Massachusetts, adopted the Constitution of the United States, and voted for it. He was elected to the Massachusetts Senate, serving from 1780 to 1782, and he was a presidential elector for the Federalist Party in the elections of 1792, 1796 and 1800. Rice died April 21, 1812, in Pownalborough, and his widowed wife Rebecca died four years later in 1816.

== Family relations ==
Thomas and Rebecca (Kingsbury) Rice had 13 children. His eldest son Thomas Rice (1768-1854) became a United States Congressman from the Maine District of Massachusetts. Rice was a direct descendant of Edmund Rice an early immigrant to Massachusetts Bay Colony as follows:

- Thomas Rice (Nov 27, 1734 – April 21, 1812), son of

- Noah Rice (1705 - Feb 1759), son of

- Thomas Rice (Jun 30, 1654 - 1747), son of
- Thomas Rice (Jan 26, 1625 – November 16, 1681), son of

- Edmund Rice (1594 - May 3, 1663)
