= Virginia's 23rd congressional district =

1813–1823 US congressional district

Coordinates: 37°30′N 77°6′W

- Obsolete district
- Created: 1810
- Eliminated: 1820
- Years active: 1813–1823

Virginia's 23rd congressional district is an obsolete congressional district. It was eliminated in 1823 after the 1820 U.S. census. Its last congressman was Andrew Stevenson.

== List of members representing the district ==
Representative	Party	Dates	Cong ress	Electoral history
District established March 4, 1813
John Clopton (Tunstall)	Democratic-Republican	March 4, 1813 – September 11, 1816	13th 14th	Redistricted from the 22nd district and re-elected in 1813. Re-elected in 1815. Died.
Vacant		September 12, 1816 – December 16, 1816	14th	
John Tyler (Charles City)	Democratic-Republican	December 17, 1816 – March 3, 1821	14th 15th 16th	Elected to finish Clopton's term. Re-elected in 1817. Re-elected in 1819. Retired.
Andrew Stevenson (Richmond)	Democratic-Republican	March 4, 1821 – March 3, 1823	17th	Elected in 1821. Redistricted to the 9th district.
District dissolved March 4, 1823
