= Massachusetts's 18th congressional district =

Obsolete district in Massachusetts, US

- Obsolete district
- Created: 1813
- Eliminated: 1820
- Years active: 1813–1821

Massachusetts's current districts, since 2013

Massachusetts's 18th congressional district is an obsolete district. During its short tenure of 1813–1821 it was located in the District of Maine, prior to Maine achieving statehood.

== List of members representing the district ==
Representative	Party	Years	Cong ress(es)	Electoral history	District location
District created March 4, 1813
John Wilson (Belfast)	Federalist	March 4, 1813 – March 3, 1815	13th	Elected in 1812. Redistricted to the 17th district and lost renomination.	1813 – 1821 "5th Eastern district," District of Maine
Thomas Rice (Augusta)	Federalist	March 4, 1815 – March 3, 1819	14th 15th	Elected in 1814. Elected in 1817 on the sixth ballot. Lost re-election.	1813 – 1821 "5th Eastern district," District of Maine
James Parker (Gardiner)	Democratic-Republican	March 4, 1819 – March 3, 1821	16th	Elected in 1819 on the second ballot. Redistricted to Maine's 5th district and lost re-election.	1813 – 1821 "5th Eastern district," District of Maine
District moved to Maine March 4, 1821
