= William Chamberlayne (soldier) =

American politician and soldier (c. 1765–1836)

Member of the Virginia Senate from Charles City, James City and New Kent Counties
- In office December 2, 1805 – December 6, 1818
- Preceded by: Burwell Bassett
- Succeeded by: George Hay

Member of the Virginia House of Delegates from New Kent County
- In office December 7, 1801 – December 5, 1802 Serving with Archibald Christian
- Preceded by: John Dandridge Watkins
- Succeeded by: James Taylor
- In office October 17, 1791 – December 31, 1797 Serving with John Clopton, John Dandridge, Robert B. Armistead
- Preceded by: John Hockaday
- Succeeded by: Joseph Foster

Personal details
- Born: 1765 Poplar Grove, New Kent County, Colony of Virginia
- Died: September 2, 1836 (aged 70–71) Henrico County, Virginia
- Spouse: Margaret Wilkinson
- Occupation: officer, Planter, politician

Military service
- Allegiance: United States
- Branch/service: Continental Army; United States Army
- Years of service: 1776–1783; 1793–1815
- Rank: Brigadier General (Virginia Militia)
- Battles/wars: American Revolutionary War; War of 1812

William Chamberlayne (c. 1765 – September 2, 1836) (sometimes referred to as "General Chamberlayne") was a Virginia planter, politician and military officer who served in both houses of the Virginia General Assembly representing New Kent County for several terms, and that and two adjoining counties in the Virginia senate for 16 years. Nonetheless, he may be better known as a correspondent with President Thomas Jefferson or for his service in the Virginia Line during the American Revolutionary War, and as Brigadier General led the Virginia militia during the War of 1812.

== Early and family life ==
Born in New Kent County to Richard Chamberlayne and his wife Mary (whose maiden name was probably Wilkinson), he inherited status and land from his paternal grandfather, a merchant who immigrated to the Virginia colony as the 18th century began. He received a private education appropriate to his class.

== Military service ==
According to obituaries, Chamberlayne served in patriotic forces during the American Revolution (probably a Virginia militia unit, although his biographer believes his life sometimes confused with that of his contemporary and cousin William Byrd Chamberlayne). William Chamberlayne accepted a commission as Captain of the New Kent county militia in 1793, when all white males were required to serve in such units. He was promoted to Major on January 24, 1798, and Lt. Colonel on June 5, 1807.

Virginia's legislature elected Chamberlayne (then a state senator as described below) as Brigadier General of his region's militia on December 12, 1807. During the second year of the War of 1812, he commanded Virginia militia units between the James and York Rivers, including defensive preparations in the strategically important Hampton Roads area, especially at Hampton, Jamestown and Yorktown during the failed British assault against Craney Island near Portsmouth. Despite his efforts, the British captured Hampton on June 25. In March 1814, Virginia's governor ordered Chamberlayne to Norfolk to command the units there, but officers of the U.S. Army also defending the important port city refused to serve under a militia general. Chamberlayne also led militia units near Richmond from late August until the end of November 1814 as Virginians feared a British attack on Richmond. Despite these responsibilities, Chamberlayne was not personally engaged in any fighting. As the conflict ended, Chamberlayne resigned his commission on April 28, 1815, believing that younger men than he should be entrusted with defending the Commonwealth in the future.

== Career ==
Chamberlayne became a justice of the peace in New Kent County in 1789, and a member of St. Peter's parish vestry by 1792.

New Kent voters elected him as one of their representatives in the Virginia House of Delegates in 1791 and re-elected Chamberlayne six times before he was defeated. They also elected him to a single term in 1801-1802. He gained influence in the legislature, in part due to his relative proximity to the state capitol, so during the final year of his re-elected terms, he was a member of five of the most influential standing committees, including of Claims, Courts of Justice, Privileges and Elections, Propositions and Grievances, and of Religion.

In 1805 Chamberlayne won the first of four consecutive (but also part-time) four-year terms to the Virginia senate, where he represented a district consisting of Charles City, James City and New Kent Counties, all to the east of Henrico County. During the 1815-1816 and 1816-1817 sessions Chamberlayne was a member of the senate's only standing committee, that of Privileges and elections.

By the early 19th century, Chamberlayne owned more than 2,000 acres of land in New Kent County, and in complicated transactions in 1810 he acquired a plantation in neighboring Henrico County from his father in law that contained more than 700 acres. Thus by 1817 he owned about 3,300 acres of land combined in New Kent and Henrico counties. According to the 1810 census, Chamberlayne owned 78 slaves in New Kent County, double the number of his neighbor Thomas Claiborne. However, the number of slaves he owned in Henrico county is complicated by the similarities between his name and that of his cousin, William Byrd Chamberlayne, who represented Henrico County several times in the House of Delegates. The 1810 census mentions both men, with simple William Chamberlayne owning 25 slaves in Henrico County. In 1820, Chamberlayne owned 84 slaves in New Kent County, but only 22 members of his household were engaged in agriculture and the larger plantation in his vicinity was run by a steward for George Washington Parke Custis. In the last census of his lifetime, this Chamberlayne owned 74 slaves in New Kent County. Chamberlayne also owned a grist mill in New Kent county, as well as a commercial fishery in season. He also gambled with friends, bred fighting cocks, kept a stud stallion and in 1815 owned a four wheeled carriage. His orchard included more than 20 varieties of apples, as well as cherries and pears, and he distilled brandy and whiskey for sale using his farm's produce.

== Personal life ==
Chamberlayne married Margaret Wilkinson in Henrico County, but few records of their family life survived, since New Kent County sent its official records to Richmond during the American Civil War, where they presumably burned during the conflagration started by the Confederate Army as it left the state capital in the war's final days.

== Death ==
Following his retirement from public life in 1818, Chamberlayne resumed his career as gentleman planter. In 1828 he sold the Henrico County plantation which he had acquired from his father in law to Edward C. Mosby, who may have married one of his daughters. Chamberlayne died at that plantation, by then Mosby's residence, on September 2, 1836.
