= Impeachment of Samuel Chase =

1804 US charging of Supreme Court justice

- Accused: Samuel Chase, associate justice of the Supreme Court of the United States
- Date: March 12, 1804 to March 1, 1805
- Outcome: Acquitted by the U.S. Senate, remained in the office of the United States Supreme Court
- Charges: Eight high crimes and misdemeanors

Key congressional votes

Voting in the U.S. House of Representatives
- Accusation: High crimes and misdemeanors
- Votes in favor: 73
- Votes against: 32
- Result: Approved resolution of impeachment

Voting in the U.S. Senate
- Result: Acquitted on each article of impeachment

Samuel Chase, an associate justice of the Supreme Court of the United States, was impeached by the United States House of Representatives on March 12, 1804, on eight articles of impeachment alleging misconduct. His impeachment trial before the United States Senate delivered an acquittal on March 1, 1805, with none of the eight articles receiving the two-thirds majority needed for a conviction.

The impeachment was a partisan affair. It was an effort by the Thomas Jefferson-led Democratic–Republican Party to weaken a judiciary that had been largely shaped by the opposing Federalist Party. The outcomes helped to solidify norms of an independent judiciary and impeachments requiring more than just a disagreement between an official and the Congress. Chase remains the only United States Supreme Court justice to have been impeached.

== Background ==
The impeachment of Samuel Chase, an associate justice of the United States Supreme Court, was politically motivated. A high-profile affair at the time, the impeachment pitted the two major United States political parties of the era against each other amid a battle between the parties over, among other things, what the role of Federal courts should look like. The era preceding the impeachment had seen heated political battle between the Federalists, led by John Adams, and the Democratic–Republicans, led by Thomas Jefferson. The Supreme Court of the United States was regarded at the time to be strongly partisan to the Federalist Party. The impeachment was in large part a reaction to this lean of the Supreme Court. Associate Justice Chase was viewed to be the most partisan justice on the Supreme Court. He was a strong Federalist and publicly made known his opposition to President Thomas Jefferson. He had campaigned for Federalist incumbent John Adams during the 1800 presidential election.

The impeachment was also, in part, a reaction to the increase in the power of the Supreme Court in the previous years under Chief Justice John Marshall, including the landmark Marbury v. Madison decision. Democratic–Republicans saw the judiciary, and especially the Supreme Court, as an obstacle to their consolidation of power in government. When Jefferson took office, all six Supreme Court justices were Federalists, and by 1804, Jefferson had only gotten the chance to make a single appointment to fill a Supreme Court vacancy. President Jefferson, alarmed at the seizure of power by the judiciary through their claim of exclusive judicial review in Marbury v. Madison, led his party's efforts to remove the Federalists from the bench. When Thomas Jefferson took office as president in 1801, after defeating Federalist incumbent president John Adams in the 1800 presidential election, he became impatient with the independence of the judiciary. He believed that Congress or the executive should have more sway over federal judges, and believed that their appointment and removal should be more routine along the lines of other appointed public officers. The 1800 United States elections had not only seen Jefferson unseat Adams, but had also seen the Democratic–Republicans capture control of both chambers of the United States Congress in what Jefferson referred to as the "Revolution of 1800". The party had won a sizable enough number of seats in the chambers of the legislature to make the party hypothetically capable of impeaching and removing a federal official with only the votes of its own members.

Jefferson's allies in Congress had, shortly after his inauguration, repealed the Judiciary Act of 1801, abolishing the lower courts created by the legislation and terminating their Federalist judges despite lifetime appointments. In May 1803, two years after this repeal, Chase denounced it in his charge to a Baltimore grand jury, saying that it would "take away all security for property and personal liberty, and our Republican constitution will sink into a mobocracy." This would play a role in the impeachment charges, along with several events from 1800. The first event from 1800 was that Chase, in April 1800 while acting as a district judge, made strong attacks upon Thomas Cooper, who had been indicted under the Alien and Sedition Acts; Chase had taken the tack of a prosecutor rather than a judge. This conduct angered Democratic–Republicans. His conduct soon after in the trial of John Fries further angered Democratic–Republicans. Even more angering was his conduct in the May 1800 trial of James T. Callender. Later in 1800, when a grand jury in New Castle, Delaware declined to indict a local printer, Chase refused to discharge them, saying he was aware of one specific printer whom he wished them to indict for seditious behavior. Jefferson saw the attack as indubitable bad behavior and an opportunity to reduce the Federalist influence on the judiciary by impeaching Chase, helping prompt the House's consideration of impeaching Chase two weeks later when he wrote to Congressman Joseph Hopper Nicholson of Maryland, asking: "Ought the seditious and official attack [by Chase] on the principles of our Constitution . . .to go unpunished?"

In 1803, Federal District Judge John Pickering, whose mental state had declined, was impeached and removed on charges of habitual drunkenness. Pickering was only the second official to be impeached by the United States House of Representatives, and was the first official to be thereafter removed after a trial by the United States Senate. This successful removal of a judge from office through impeachment emboldened many in Congress to use the tool of impeachment as a means of pushing the Supreme Court towards subservience. Similarly encouraging was the removal of Pennsylvania judge Alexander Addison through an impeachment by that state's legislature. The resolution that officially impeached Chase was adopted by the House of Representatives only an hour after Pickering was convicted in his impeachment trial on March 12, 1804. Democratic–Republicans took a broad view of what impeachment could be used for. They effectively believed that the Congress could use impeachment to remove judges whose opinions were disfavored by more than one-third of senators, viewing this as a means of keeping judges in line with the sentiments of "the people".

== Inquiry prior to the impeachment ==
=== Vote to launch inquiry ===
An impeachment inquiry into Chase was precipitated by Congressman John Randolph of Roanoke, a staunch partisan of the Democratic–Republicans. On January 5, 1804, Randolph introduced a resolution to appoint a special committee "to inquire into the official conduct of Samuel Chase, one of the associate Justices of the Supreme Court of the United States". Randolph wanted formal inquiry to be made into a report that Democratic–Republican John Smilie had made in the previous session of congress which had questioned Chase's conduct in the Fries trial.

Federalist James Elliott raised objection. Arguing that a vote for inquiry would be a "prima facie censure", Elliott argued that there was an absence of evidence of any "flagrant misconduct" and that the House could not censure a judge for merely questionable conduct. However, Democratic–Republicans such as Smilie and Matthew Clay argued that an inquiry was necessary for the very purpose of enabling the House to find facts to inform how it would proceed. Clay argued that examining judicial conduct was important, arguing that "judicial independence" if unscrutinized could "become dangerous to the liberties of our country." During debate, Federalist Roger Griswold laid-out a preemptive defense for Chase, arguing that even if he may have erred in his interpretation of a matter of law during the Fries trial, it would not be a grounds for impeachment since it would be an error in judgment and not an act of malice. Throughout the debate, House members such as Clay and Griswold denied holding any bias on the matter, despite their obvious partisan stances.

The following day, investigation of Judge Peters was added by amendment to the proposed resolution in a 79–37 vote of the House, adding the language, "..and of Richard Peters, the district judge of the district of Pennsylvania". Elliott attempted delay the resolution, but lacked the votes to do so. The amended resolution was adopted by the House on January 7, 1804, in an 81–40 vote.

Randolph's advancing of an impeachment process against Chase alarmed a number of Federalists who had already feared the potential politicalization of impeachment. Former congressman Fisher Ames perceived the effort to impeach Chase as an escalation of political conflict.

Impeachment inquiry authorization vote
March 12, 1804	Party		Total votes
March 12, 1804	Federalist	Democratic-Republican	Total votes
Yea	0	81	81
Nay	38	2	40

Votes by member on the impeachment inquiry authorization
District	Member	Party	Vote
North Carolina 10	Nathaniel Alexander	D–R	Yea
North Carolina 2	Willis Alston	D–R	Yea
Pennsylvania 3 (seat B)	Isaac Anderson	D–R	Absent
Maryland 6	John Archer	D–R	Absent
Connecticut at-large (seat B)	Simeon Baldwin	F	Nay
Pennsylvania 4 (seat B)	David Bard	D–R	Yea
Kentucky 6	George M. Bedinger	D–R	Yea
New Hampshire at-large (seat A)	Silas Betton	F	Nay
Massachusetts 9	Phanuel Bishop	D–R	Yea
North Carolina 4	William Blackledge	D–R	Yea
Maryland 2	Walter Bowie	D–R	Absent
New Jersey at-large (seat A)	Adam Boyd	D–R	Yea
Kentucky 2	John Boyle	D–R	Yea
Pennsylvania 2 (seat A)	Robert Brown	D–R	Yea
Georgia at-large (seat C)	Joseph Bryan	D–R	Yea
South Carolina 2	William Butler	D–R	Yea
Tennessee at-large (seat B)	George W. Campbell	D–R	Absent
Maryland 1	John Campbell	F	Nay
South Carolina 6	Levi Casey	D–R	Yea
Vermont 3	William Chamberlain	F	Nay
Vermont 4	Martin Chittenden	F	Nay
New Hampshire at-large (seat E)	Clifton Clagett	F	Nay
Virginia 17	Thomas Claiborne	D–R	Absent
Pennsylvania 1 (seat A)	Joseph Clay	D–R	Yea
Virginia 14	Matthew Clay	D–R	Absent
Virginia 22	John Clopton	D–R	Yea
Pennsylvania 2 (seat B)	Frederick Conrad	D–R	Absent
Massachusetts 2	Jacob Crowninshield	D–R	Yea
Massachusetts 3	Manasseh Cutler	F	Nay
Massachusetts 14	Richard Cutts	D–R	Yea
Connecticut at-large (seat G)	Samuel W. Dana	F	Nay
Connecticut at-large (seat F)	John Davenport	F	Nay
Virginia 10	John Dawson	D–R	Absent
Maryland 8	John Dennis	F	Nay
Tennessee at-large (seat A)	William Dickson	D–R	Yea
Massachusetts 5	Thomas Dwight	F	Nay
South Carolina 8	John B. Earle	D–R	Yea
Georgia at-large (seat B)	Peter Early	D–R	Yea
Vermont 2	James Elliot	F	Nay
New Jersey at-large (seat B)	Ebenezer Elmer	D–R	Yea
Virginia 16	John Wayles Eppes	D–R	Yea
Massachusetts 1	William Eustis	D–R	Yea
Pennsylvania 8	William Findley	D–R	Yea
Kentucky 5	John Fowler	D–R	Yea
North Carolina 5	James Gillespie	D–R	Yea
Connecticut at-large (seat E)	Calvin Goddard	F	Absent
Virginia 18	Peterson Goodwyn	D–R	Absent
Virginia 19	Edwin Gray	D–R	Yea
Pennsylvania 5	Andrew Gregg	D–R	Yea
Virginia 12	Thomas Griffin	F	Nay
New York 15	Gaylord Griswold	F	Nay
Connecticut at-large (seat D)	Roger Griswold	F	Nay
Georgia at-large (seat D)	Samuel Hammond	D–R	Absent
South Carolina 4	Wade Hampton I	D–R	Absent
Pennsylvania 4 (seat A)	John A. Hanna	D–R	Yea
New York 7	Josiah Hasbrouck	D–R	Yea
Massachusetts 10	Seth Hastings	F	Nay
New Jersey at-large (seat C)	William Helms	D–R	Absent
Pennsylvania 3 (seat A)	Joseph Hiester	D–R	Absent
Pennsylvania 10	William Hoge	D–R	Yea
North Carolina 11	James Holland	D–R	Yea
Virginia 4	David Holmes	D–R	Yea
New Hampshire at-large (seat D)	David Hough	F	Nay
South Carolina 3	Benjamin Huger	F	Nay
New Hampshire at-large (seat B)	Samuel Hunt	F	Nay
Virginia 1	John G. Jackson	D–R	Yea
Virginia 8	Walter Jones	D–R	Yea
North Carolina 3	William Kennedy	D–R	Yea
Rhode Island at-large (seat B)	Nehemiah Knight	D–R	Yea
Pennsylvania 1 (seat C)	Michael Leib	D–R	Yea
Virginia 7	Joseph Lewis Jr.	F	Nay
Virginia 5	Thomas Lewis Jr.	F	Nay
New York 8	Henry W. Livingston	F	Nay
South Carolina 1	Thomas Lowndes	F	Nay
Pennsylvania 11	John Baptiste Charles Lucas	D–R	Yea
Kentucky 1	Matthew Lyon	D–R	Yea
North Carolina 6	Nathaniel Macon	D–R	Did not vote (speaker)^{α}
New York 5	Andrew McCord	D–R	Yea
Maryland 5 (seat B)	William McCreery	D–R	Absent
Georgia at-large (seat A)	David Meriwether	D–R	Yea
Massachusetts 7	Nahum Mitchell	F	Nay
New York 3	Samuel Latham Mitchill	F	Nay
Maryland 5 (seat A)	Nicholas Ruxton Moore	D–R	Yea
South Carolina 7	Thomas Moore	D–R	Yea
Ohio at-large	Jeremiah Morrow	D–R	Yea
New Jersey at-large (seat D)	James Mott	D–R	Nay
Virginia 11	Anthony New	D–R	Yea
Virginia 20	Thomas Newton Jr.	D–R	Yea
Maryland 7	Joseph Hopper Nicholson	D–R	Yea
Vermont 1	Gideon Olin	D–R	Yea
New York 11	Beriah Palmer	D–R	Yea
New York 16	John Paterson	D–R	Yea
New York 17	Oliver Phelps	D–R	Yea
Maryland 3	Thomas Plater	F	Nay
North Carolina 7	Samuel D. Purviance	F	Nay
Virginia 15	John Randolph of Roanoke	D–R	Yea
Virginia 21	Thomas Mann Randolph Jr.	D–R	Yea
Pennsylvania 7	John Rea	D–R	Yea
Tennessee 1	John Rhea	D–R	Yea
Pennsylvania 1 (seat B)	Jacob Richards	D–R	Yea
Delaware at-large	Caesar Augustus Rodney	D–R	Absent
New York 14	Erastus Root	D–R	Yea
New York 13	Thomas Sammons	D–R	Yea
Kentucky 4	Thomas Sandford	D–R	Yea
New York 2	Joshua Sands	F	Nay
Massachusetts 13	Ebenezer Seaver	D–R	Yea
Massachusetts 12	Thomson J. Skinner	D–R	Yea
New Jersey at-large (seat F)	James Sloan	D–R	Yea
Pennsylvania 9	John Smilie	D–R	Yea
New York 1	John Smith	D–R	Nay
Virginia 3	John Smith	D–R	Yea
Connecticut at-large (seat C)	John Cotton Smith	F	Nay
New Jersey at-large (seat E)	Henry Southard	D–R	Absent
North Carolina 8	Richard Stanford	D–R	Yea
Rhode Island at-large (seat A)	Joseph Stanton Jr.	D–R	Yea
Massachusetts 11	William Stedman	F	Nay
Virginia 2	James Stephenson	F	Nay
Pennsylvania 6	John Stewart	D–R	Yea
Massachusetts 6	Samuel Taggart	F	Nay
Connecticut at-large (seat A)	Benjamin Tallmadge	F	Absent
New Hampshire at-large (seat C)	Samuel Tenney	F	Nay
Massachusetts 16	Samuel Thatcher	F	Nay
New York 12	David Thomas	D–R	Yea
Virginia 9	Philip R. Thompson	D–R	Yea
New York 10	George Tibbits	F	Nay
Virginia 6	Abram Trigg	D–R	Yea
Virginia 13	John Johns Trigg	D–R	Yea
New York 4	Philip Van Cortlandt	D–R	Yea
Pennsylvania 2 (seat C)	Isaac Van Horne	D–R	Yea
New York 9	Killian K. Van Rensselaer	F	Nay
Massachusetts 4	Joseph Bradley Varnum	D–R	Yea
New York 6	Daniel C. Verplanck	D–R	Yea
Massachusetts 15	Peleg Wadsworth	F	Nay
Kentucky 3	Matthew Walton	D–R	Yea
Pennsylvania 3 (seat C)	John Whitehill	D–R	Yea
Massachusetts 8	Lemuel Williams	F	Nay
North Carolina 9	Marmaduke Williams	D–R	Yea
South Carolina 5	Richard Winn	D–R	Yea
North Carolina 12	Joseph Winston	D–R	Yea
North Carolina 1	Thomas Wynns	D–R	Yea
Notes:^α Nathaniel Macon was serving as Speaker of the House. Per House rules, "the Speaker is not required to vote in ordinary legislative proceedings, except when such vote would be decisive or when the House is engaged in voting by ballot."

=== Early inquiry developments ===
The congressmen appointed to the special committee to run the inquiry were John Boyle, Joseph Clay, Peter Early, Roger Griswold, Benjamin Huger, Joseph Hopper Nicholson, John Randolph of Roanoke.

Members of the special committee
Democratic–Republicans	Federalists
John Boyle, Kentucky; Joseph Clay, Pennsylvania; Peter Early, Georgia; Joseph Hopper Nicholson, Maryland; John Randolph of Roanoke, Virginia	Roger Griswold, Connecticut; Benjamin Huger, South Carolina

On January 10, 1804, the House authorized the special committee to send for people, papers, and records. On January 30, 1804, the House authorized them to print any documents and papers that they deemed to be necessary.

With Randolph usurping Nicholson to lead the impeachment effort, Jefferson became somewhat hesitant over whether he would continue to support it. He and Randolph had previously politically fought over their different positions on the Louisiana Purchase, and believed Randolph could potentially head a rival splintering of the Democratic–Republican party. Randolph attempted to keep respectful relations with the Jefferson's administration, but recognized that Jefferson did not hold positive regard for him. This tension lessened the degree of unified party support for the impeachment, and played some role in the extended delay between the launch of the inquiry and the adoption of articles of impeachment. During the inquiry, Randolph's health became seriously strained. He remained unceasing in his pursuit of impeachment to the detriment of his own health.

Randolph, despite having read law, had not frequently practiced as a lawyer and did not take a very legalistic approach to questioning and arguments during the inquiry. Instead of legal-based concerns, he argued common-sense based concerns, which played well among the membership of the House. Federalists sought to slow the inquiry by bringing up complex questions of procedure.

== Impeachment vote ==
The special committee running the impeachment inquiry submitted a report to the House on March 6, 1804, recommending the impeachment of Chase along with an impeachment resolution. On March 12, 1804, the special committee formally presented its report on its investigations to the full House. The reported read,

That in consequence of the evidence collected by them, in virtue of the powers with which they have been invested by the house, and which is hereunto subjoined, they are of the opinion,

1. That Samuel Chase, Esq., one of the justices of the Supreme Court of the United States, be impeached of high crimes and misdemeanors.

2. That Richard Peters, district judge of the district of Pennsylvania, has not so acted in his judiciary capacity as to require the interposition of the Constitutional powers of this House.

The committee had also created a great number of printed documents that outlined a number of testimonies and depositions taken both by the committee itself and by others.

On March 12, 1804, after the special committee reported to the House, the House proceeded without debate to vote on the impeachment resolution. The House voted 73–32 to adopt the resolution to impeach Chase. This marked the third time that the United States House of Representatives had voted to practice its power to impeach a federal civil officer, with the two previous incidents being the 1797 impeachment of William Blount (which saw the United States Senate vote to dismiss the charges due to questions over whether members of the United States Congress were actually constitutionally subject to its own impeachment powers) and the 1803 impeachment of New Hampshire federal district court judge John Pickering. The vote to adopt the Chase impeachment resolution, incidentally, came only one hour after the Senate voted to convict Pickering in Pickering's impeachment trial.

The impeachment resolution read:

Resolved, That Samuel Chase Esquire, one of the Associate Justices of the Supreme Court of the United States, be impeached of high crimes and misdemeanors.

After the adoption of the resolution, Congressmen John Randolph of Roanoke and Peter Early were appointed to a committee to go before the Senate and inform them of the impeachment vote. On March 14, 1804, the House received a message from the Senate that the Senate would take proper order on impeachment.

Impeachment resolution vote
March 12, 1804	Party		Total votes
March 12, 1804	Federalist	Democratic-Republican	Total votes
Yea	1	72	73
Nay	30	2	32

Votes by member on the impeachment resolution
District	Member	Party	Vote
North Carolina 10	Nathaniel Alexander	D–R	Absent
North Carolina 2	Willis Alston	D–R	Yea
Pennsylvania 3 (seat B)	Isaac Anderson	D–R	Yea
Maryland 6	John Archer	D–R	Yea
Connecticut at-large (seat B)	Simeon Baldwin	F	Nay
Pennsylvania 4 (seat B)	David Bard	D–R	Yea
Kentucky 6	George M. Bedinger	D–R	Yea
New Hampshire at-large (seat A)	Silas Betton	F	Nay
Massachusetts 9	Phanuel Bishop	D–R	Absent
North Carolina 4	William Blackledge	D–R	Yea
Maryland 2	Walter Bowie	D–R	Yea
New Jersey at-large (seat A)	Adam Boyd	D–R	Yea
Kentucky 2	John Boyle	D–R	Yea
Pennsylvania 2 (seat A)	Robert Brown	D–R	Yea
Georgia at-large (seat C)	Joseph Bryan	D–R	Yea
South Carolina 2	William Butler	D–R	Yea
Tennessee at-large (seat B)	George W. Campbell	D–R	Absent
Maryland 1	John Campbell	F	Nay
South Carolina 6	Levi Casey	D–R	Yea
Vermont 3	William Chamberlain	F	Nay
Vermont 4	Martin Chittenden	F	Nay
New Hampshire at-large (seat E)	Clifton Clagett	F	Nay
Virginia 17	Thomas Claiborne	D–R	Yea
Pennsylvania 1 (seat A)	Joseph Clay	D–R	Yea
Virginia 14	Matthew Clay	D–R	Yea
Virginia 22	John Clopton	D–R	Yea
Pennsylvania 2 (seat B)	Frederick Conrad	D–R	Yea
Massachusetts 2	Jacob Crowninshield	D–R	Yea
Massachusetts 3	Manasseh Cutler	F	Nay
Massachusetts 14	Richard Cutts	D–R	Yea
Connecticut at-large (seat G)	Samuel W. Dana	F	Nay
Connecticut at-large (seat F)	John Davenport	F	Nay
Virginia 10	John Dawson	D–R	Yea
Maryland 8	John Dennis	F	Absent
Tennessee at-large (seat A)	William Dickson	D–R	Yea
Massachusetts 5	Thomas Dwight	F	Nay
South Carolina 8	John B. Earle	D–R	Yea
Georgia at-large (seat B)	Peter Early	D–R	Yea
Vermont 2	James Elliot	F	Yea
New Jersey at-large (seat B)	Ebenezer Elmer	D–R	Absent
Virginia 16	John Wayles Eppes	D–R	Absent
Massachusetts 1	William Eustis	D–R	Absent
Pennsylvania 8	William Findley	D–R	Yea
Kentucky 5	John Fowler	D–R	Yea
North Carolina 5	James Gillespie	D–R	Yea
Connecticut at-large (seat E)	Calvin Goddard	F	Absent
Virginia 18	Peterson Goodwyn	D–R	Yea
Virginia 19	Edwin Gray	D–R	Absent
Pennsylvania 5	Andrew Gregg	D–R	Yea
Virginia 12	Thomas Griffin	F	Nay
New York 15	Gaylord Griswold	F	Nay
Connecticut at-large (seat D)	Roger Griswold	F	Nay
Georgia at-large (seat D)	Samuel Hammond	D–R	Yea
South Carolina 4	Wade Hampton I	D–R	Absent
Pennsylvania 4 (seat A)	John A. Hanna	D–R	Absent
New York 7	Josiah Hasbrouck	D–R	Absent
Massachusetts 10	Seth Hastings	F	Nay
New Jersey at-large (seat C)	William Helms	D–R	Nay
Pennsylvania 3 (seat A)	Joseph Hiester	D–R	Absent
Pennsylvania 10	William Hoge	D–R	Absent
North Carolina 11	James Holland	D–R	Yea
Virginia 4	David Holmes	D–R	Yea
New Hampshire at-large (seat D)	David Hough	F	Absent
South Carolina 3	Benjamin Huger	F	Nay
New Hampshire at-large (seat B)	Samuel Hunt	F	Absent
Virginia 1	John G. Jackson	D–R	Absent
Virginia 8	Walter Jones	D–R	Yea
North Carolina 3	William Kennedy	D–R	Yea
Rhode Island at-large (seat B)	Nehemiah Knight	D–R	Yea
Pennsylvania 1 (seat C)	Michael Leib	D–R	Yea
Virginia 7	Joseph Lewis Jr.	F	Nay
New York 8	Henry W. Livingston	F	Nay
South Carolina 1	Thomas Lowndes	F	Nay
Pennsylvania 11	John Baptiste Charles Lucas	D–R	Absent
Kentucky 1	Matthew Lyon	D–R	Yea
North Carolina 6	Nathaniel Macon	D–R	Did not vote (speaker)^{α}
New York 5	Andrew McCord	D–R	Yea
Maryland 5 (seat B)	William McCreery	D–R	Yea
Georgia at-large (seat A)	David Meriwether	D–R	Yea
Massachusetts 7	Nahum Mitchell	F	Nay
New York 3	Samuel Latham Mitchill	F	Absent
Virginia 5	Andrew Moore	D–R	Yea
Maryland 5 (seat A)	Nicholas Ruxton Moore	D–R	Yea
South Carolina 7	Thomas Moore	D–R	Absent
Ohio at-large	Jeremiah Morrow	D–R	Yea
New Jersey at-large (seat D)	James Mott	D–R	Absent
Virginia 11	Anthony New	D–R	Yea
Virginia 20	Thomas Newton Jr.	D–R	Yea
Maryland 7	Joseph Hopper Nicholson	D–R	Yea
Vermont 1	Gideon Olin	D–R	Yea
New York 11	Beriah Palmer	D–R	Absent
New York 16	John Paterson	D–R	Yea
New York 17	Oliver Phelps	D–R	Absent
Maryland 3	Thomas Plater	F	Nay
North Carolina 7	Samuel D. Purviance	F	Nay
Virginia 15	John Randolph of Roanoke	D–R	Yea
Virginia 21	Thomas Mann Randolph Jr.	D–R	Yea
Pennsylvania 7	John Rea	D–R	Yea
Tennessee 1	John Rhea	D–R	Yea
Pennsylvania 1 (seat B)	Jacob Richards	D–R	Yea
Delaware at-large	Caesar Augustus Rodney	D–R	Yea
New York 14	Erastus Root	D–R	Absent
New York 13	Thomas Sammons	D–R	Yea
Kentucky 4	Thomas Sandford	D–R	Yea
New York 2	Joshua Sands	F	Absent
Massachusetts 13	Ebenezer Seaver	D–R	Yea
Massachusetts 12	Thomson J. Skinner	D–R	Absent
New Jersey at-large (seat F)	James Sloan	D–R	Yea
Pennsylvania 9	John Smilie	D–R	Yea
New York 1	John Smith	D–R	Absent
Virginia 3	John Smith	D–R	Nay
Connecticut at-large (seat C)	John Cotton Smith	F	Nay
New Jersey at-large (seat E)	Henry Southard	D–R	Yea
North Carolina 8	Richard Stanford	D–R	Yea
Rhode Island at-large (seat A)	Joseph Stanton Jr.	D–R	Yea
Massachusetts 11	William Stedman	F	Nay
Virginia 2	James Stephenson	F	Nay
Pennsylvania 6	John Stewart	D–R	Yea
Massachusetts 6	Samuel Taggart	F	Nay
Connecticut at-large (seat A)	Benjamin Tallmadge	F	Absent
New Hampshire at-large (seat C)	Samuel Tenney	F	Nay
Massachusetts 16	Samuel Thatcher	F	Nay
New York 12	David Thomas	D–R	Yea
Virginia 9	Philip R. Thompson	D–R	Yea
New York 10	George Tibbits	F	Absent
Virginia 6	Abram Trigg	D–R	Yea
Virginia 13	John Johns Trigg	D–R	Yea
New York 4	Philip Van Cortlandt	D–R	Absent
Pennsylvania 2 (seat C)	Isaac Van Horne	D–R	Yea
New York 9	Killian K. Van Rensselaer	F	Nay
Massachusetts 4	Joseph Bradley Varnum	D–R	Yea
New York 6	Daniel C. Verplanck	D–R	Absent
Massachusetts 15	Peleg Wadsworth	F	Nay
Kentucky 3	Matthew Walton	D–R	Absent
Pennsylvania 3 (seat C)	John Whitehill	D–R	Absent
Massachusetts 8	Lemuel Williams	F	Nay
North Carolina 9	Marmaduke Williams	D–R	Yea
South Carolina 5	Richard Winn	D–R	Yea
North Carolina 12	Joseph Winston	D–R	Yea
North Carolina 1	Thomas Wynns	D–R	Absent
Notes:^α Nathaniel Macon was serving as Speaker of the House. Per House rules, "the Speaker is not required to vote in ordinary legislative proceedings, except when such vote would be decisive or when the House is engaged in voting by ballot."

== Subsequent months of inquiry ==
The period after the impeachment resolution was passed saw months of continued impeachment inquiry investigating the activities of Chase along with a months-long effort by the Democratic–Republicans to shape public opinion in favor of removing Chase. It would only be eleven months after the inquiry originally began in January that articles of impeachment were adopted.

== Adoption of articles of impeachment ==
In early United States federal impeachments, it was practice to first pass a general impeachment resolution, and only afterwards adopt articles of impeachment outlining specific charges. This differs from modern United States federal impeachment practices.

On March 13, 1804, a special committee was appointed to draw up article of impeachment against Chase. Appointed to the committee were Congressmen John Boyle, Joseph Clay, Peter Early, Joseph Hopper Nicholson, and John Randolph of Roanoke. Seven articles of impeachment were reported to the House by Randolph on March 26, 1804, but were ordered to lie on the table and no action was taken on them before the congress entered a recess. On November 6, 1804, the articles were referred to a special committee consisting of Congressmen Joseph Clay, Peter Early, and John Randolph of Roanoke, and John Rhea.

On November 30, 1804, at the end of impeachment inquiry activities, Congressman Randolph reported eight articles of impeachment to the House. On December 4, 1804, the House of Representatives held votes to adopt the eight articles of impeachment.

All the counts involved Chase's work as a trial judge in lower circuit courts. In that day, Supreme Court justices had the added duty of individually serving on circuit courts. The Supreme Court's justices would only spend a small fraction of their time meeting together as appellate judges in Washington, D.C. The bulk of their time was spent acting as circuit judges in separate geographic areas of the United States. In this role they would serve in tandem with a federal district judge permanently assigned to that area's court. The Supreme Court's judges were not fond of the arrangement that saw them tasked with these circuit court duties. The heart of the allegations made against Chase was that political bias had led Chase to treat defendants and their counsel in a blatantly unfair manner.

Despite the Democratic–Republican theory that impeachment did not require a criminal act, many of the articles focused on acts that were dubiously alleged to be criminal. It is unclear the exact reason that these charges were included among the articles of impeachment, but one theory is that John Randolph of Roanoke was interested in proving criminality on Chase's part, regardless of his own theory of impeachment not requiring criminality.

The order of the articles of impeachment placed the offending events in chronological order.

=== Article I ===
The first article of impeachment charged Chase of acting improperly during the circuit court treason trial of John Fries in 1800, accusing Chase of having failed to act as an impartial judge and instead having acted, "in a manner high arbitrary, oppressive, and unjust". The article accused Chase of being biased against Fries' defense.

Three examples of Chase's alleged lack of impartiality were cited in the article. The first example claimed that Chase had delivered a written opinion on the matter of law upon which the defense of Fries materially rested before his defense counsel had been able to speak before the jury, thereby prejudicing the jury against Fries' defense. The second example claimed that Chase had restricted Fries' defense counsel from citing a number of English legal authorities and a number of United States statutes that they had held would be illustrative of the positions they were outlining in their defense. The third example claimed that he had debarred Fries from, "his constitutional privilege of addressing the jury (through his counsel) on the law, as well on the fact, which, was to determine his guilt or innocence, and at the same time endeavoring to wrest from the jury their indisputable right to hear argument and determine upon the question of law, as well as the question of fact, involved in the verdict which they were required to give".

The article was adopted by a vote of 82–34.

=== Article II ===
The second article accused Chase of acting improperly in the May 1800 trial in which James T. Callender was charged under the Alien and Sedition Act with seditious libel against President John Adams by ruling against the request of a jury member, John Basset, to be excused from serving due to having already reached a personal judgement on the case before the trial. The article was adopted by a vote of 83–35.

=== Article III ===
The third article accused Chase of misconduct in the James T. Callender trial by refusing to permit John Taylor to testify as a material witness on behalf of Callender. The article was adopted by a vote of 83–34.

=== Article IV ===
The fourth article related to the conduct of Chase during the Callender trial, accusing him of conduct that was marked by "manifest injustice, partiality, and intemperance." The article cited several examples. The article was adopted by a vote of 84–34.

=== Article V ===
The fifth article alleged that his issuing of a warrant instead of a summons during the Callender trial was not in keeping with the statutory language of "An act to establish the judicial courts of the United States". No evil intent was alleged, with the article effectively arguing that an error could constitute an impeachable offense. The article was adopted by a vote of 70–45.

=== Article VI ===
The sixth article alleged that his refusal of a continuance during the Callender trial was not in keeping with the statutory language of "An act to establish the judicial courts of the United States". The article was adopted by a vote of 73–42.

=== Article VII ===
The seventh article dealt with Chase's conduct at the New Castle, Delaware grand jury. The article was adopted by a vote of 73–38.

=== Article VIII ===
The eighth article dealt with Chase's conduct at the Baltimore grand jury. It accused Chase of being, "highly indecent, extra-judicial," and also accused him of, "tending to prostitute the high judicial character with which he was invested, to the low purpose of an electioneering partizan." The article, arguably, was most reflective of the primary motivation for the impeachment: the view that Chase was a partisan Federalist. The first section of the article, outlining the charges, was adopted by a vote of 74–39. A second segment of the article, which outlined some general aspects of the impeachment process and preparation for trial, was adopted by a separate vote of 78–32.

==== Vote overview ====
Summary of the House of Representatives adoption of the articles of impeachment
December 4, 1804 Article I	Party		Total votes
December 4, 1804 Article I	Federalist	Democratic-Republican	Total votes
Yea	0	82	82
Nay	33	1	34
December 4, 1804 Article II	Party		Total votes
December 4, 1804 Article II	Federalist	Democratic-Republican	Total votes
Yea	0	83	83
Nay	33	2	35
December 14, 1804 Article III	Party		Total votes
December 14, 1804 Article III	Federalist	Democratic-Republican	Total votes
Yea	0	83	83
Nay	33	1	34
December 4, 1804 Article IV	Party		Total votes
December 4, 1804 Article IV	Federalist	Democratic-Republican	Total votes
Yea	0	84	84
Nay	33	1	34
December 4, 1804 Article V	Party		Total votes
December 4, 1804 Article V	Federalist	Democratic-Republican	Total votes
Yea	0	70	70
Nay	32	13	45
December 4, 1804 Article VI	Party		Total votes
December 4, 1804 Article VI	Federalist	Democratic-Republican	Total votes
Yea	0	73	73
Nay	33	9	42
December 4, 1804 Article VII	Party		Total votes
December 4, 1804 Article VII	Federalist	Democratic-Republican	Total votes
Yea	0	73	73
Nay	32	6	38
December 4, 1804 Article VIII (Sec. 1)	Party		Total votes
December 4, 1804 Article VIII (Sec. 1)	Federalist	Democratic-Republican	Total votes
Yea	0	74	74
Nay	32	7	39
December 4, 1804 Article VIII (Sec. 2)	Party		Total votes
December 4, 1804 Article VIII (Sec. 2)	Federalist	Democratic-Republican	Total votes
Yea	0	78	78
Nay	30	2	32

Votes by member
District	Member	Party	Votes on articles								
District	Member	Party	1st	2nd	3rd	4th	5th	6th	7th	8th (Sec. 1)	8th (Sec. 2)
North Carolina 10	Nathaniel Alexander	D–R	Absent	Absent	Absent	Absent	Absent	Absent	Absent	Absent	Absent
North Carolina 2	Willis Alston	D–R	Yea	Yea	Yea	Yea	Nay	Nay	Yea	Nay	Yea
Pennsylvania 3 (seat B)	Isaac Anderson	D–R	Yea	Yea	Yea	Yea	Yea	Yea	Yea	Yea	Yea
Maryland 6	John Archer	D–R	Yea	Yea	Yea	Yea	Yea	Yea	Yea	Yea	Yea
Connecticut at-large (seat B)	Simeon Baldwin	F	Nay	Nay	Nay	Nay	Absent	Nay	Nay	Nay	Nay
Pennsylvania 4 (seat A)	David Bard	D–R	Yea	Yea	Yea	Yea	Yea	Yea	Yea	Absent	Absent
Kentucky 6	George M. Bedinger	D–R	Yea	Yea	Yea	Yea	Yea	Yea	Yea	Yea	Yea
New Hampshire at-large (seat A)	Silas Betton	F	Nay	Nay	Nay	Nay	Nay	Nay	Nay	Nay	Nay
Massachusetts 9	Phanuel Bishop	D–R	Yea	Yea	Yea	Yea	Yea	Absent	Absent	Absent	Absent
North Carolina 4	William Blackledge	D–R	Yea	Yea	Yea	Yea	Nay	Yea	Nay	Nay	Yea
Maryland 2	Walter Bowie	D–R	Absent	Absent	Absent	Absent	Absent	Absent	Absent	Absent	Absent
New Jersey at-large (seat A)	Adam Boyd	D–R	Yea	Yea	Yea	Yea	Yea	Yea	Yea	Yea	Yea
Kentucky 2	John Boyle	D–R	Yea	Yea	Yea	Yea	Yea	Yea	Yea	Yea	Yea
Pennsylvania 2 (seat A)	Robert Brown	D–R	Yea	Yea	Yea	Yea	Yea	Yea	Yea	Yea	Yea
Georgia at-large (seat C)	Joseph Bryan	D–R	Yea	Yea	Yea	Yea	Yea	Yea	Absent	Yea	Yea
South Carolina 2	William Butler	D–R	Yea	Yea	Yea	Yea	Yea	Yea	Yea	Yea	Yea
Tennessee at-large (seat B)	George W. Campbell	D–R	Yea	Yea	Yea	Yea	Absent	Absent	Nay	Absent	Absent
Maryland 1	John Campbell	F	Nay	Nay	Nay	Nay	Nay	Nay	Nay	Nay	Nay
South Carolina 6	Levi Casey	D–R	Yea	Yea	Yea	Yea	Yea	Yea	Yea	Yea	Yea
Vermont 3	William Chamberlain	F	Nay	Nay	Nay	Nay	Nay	Nay	Nay	Nay	Nay
Vermont 4	Martin Chittenden	F	Nay	Nay	Nay	Nay	Nay	Nay	Nay	Nay	Nay
New Hampshire at-large (seat E)	Clifton Clagett	F	Nay	Nay	Nay	Nay	Nay	Nay	Nay	Nay	Nay
Virginia 17	Thomas Claiborne	D–R	Yea	Yea	Yea	Yea	Yea	Yea	Yea	Yea	Yea
Virginia 13	Christopher H. Clark	D–R	Yea	Yea	Yea	Yea	Yea	Nay	Yea	Yea	Yea
Pennsylvania 1 (seat A)	Joseph Clay	D–R	Yea	Yea	Yea	Yea	Yea	Yea	Absent	Yea	Yea
Virginia 14	Matthew Clay	D–R	Yea	Yea	Yea	Yea	Yea	Yea	Yea	Yea	Yea
Virginia 22	John Clopton	D–R	Absent	Absent	Absent	Absent	Absent	Absent	Absent	Absent	Absent
Pennsylvania 2 (seat B)	Frederick Conrad	D–R	Yea	Yea	Yea	Yea	Yea	Yea	Yea	Yea	Yea
Massachusetts 2	Jacob Crowninshield	D–R	Yea	Yea	Yea	Yea	Yea	Yea	Yea	Yea	Yea
Massachusetts 3	Manasseh Cutler	F	Nay	Nay	Nay	Nay	Nay	Nay	Nay	Nay	Nay
Massachusetts 14	Richard Cutts	D–R	Yea	Yea	Yea	Yea	Yea	Yea	Absent	Absent	Absent
Connecticut at-large (seat G)	Samuel W. Dana	F	Nay	Nay	Nay	Nay	Nay	Nay	Nay	Nay	Nay
Connecticut at-large (seat F)	John Davenport	F	Nay	Nay	Nay	Nay	Nay	Nay	Nay	Nay	Nay
Virginia 10	John Dawson	D–R	Yea	Yea	Yea	Yea	Yea	Yea	Yea	Yea	Yea
Maryland 8	John Dennis	F	Absent	Absent	Absent	Absent	Absent	Absent	Absent	Absent	Absent
Tennessee at-large (seat A)	William Dickson	D–R	Absent	Yea	Yea	Yea	Yea	Yea	Yea	Yea	Yea
Massachusetts 5	Thomas Dwight	F	Nay	Nay	Nay	Nay	Nay	Nay	Nay	Nay	Nay
South Carolina 8	John B. Earle	D–R	Yea	Yea	Yea	Yea	Yea	Yea	Yea	Nay	Yea
Georgia at-large (seat B)	Peter Early	D–R	Yea	Yea	Yea	Yea	Absent	Yea	Yea	Yea	Yea
Vermont 2	James Elliot	F	Nay	Nay	Nay	Nay	Nay	Nay	Nay	Nay	Nay
New Jersey at-large (seat B)	Ebenezer Elmer	D–R	Yea	Yea	Yea	Yea	Nay	Nay	Nay	Yea	Yea
Virginia 16	John Wayles Eppes	D–R	Yea	Yea	Yea	Yea	Yea	Yea	Yea	Yea	Yea
Massachusetts 1	William Eustis	D–R	Absent	Absent	Absent	Absent	Absent	Absent	Absent	Absent	Absent
Pennsylvania 8	William Findley	D–R	Yea	Yea	Yea	Yea	Yea	Yea	Yea	Yea	Yea
Kentucky 5	John Fowler	D–R	Absent	Absent	Absent	Absent	Absent	Absent	Absent	Absent	Absent
North Carolina 5	James Gillespie	D–R	Yea	Yea	Yea	Yea	Yea	Yea	Yea	Yea	Yea
Connecticut at-large (seat E)	Calvin Goddard	F	Nay	Nay	Nay	Nay	Nay	Nay	Absent	Nay	Nay
Virginia 18	Peterson Goodwyn	D–R	Yea	Yea	Yea	Yea	Yea	Yea	Yea	Yea	Yea
Virginia 19	Edwin Gray	D–R	Yea	Yea	Yea	Yea	Yea	Yea	Yea	Yea	Yea
Pennsylvania 5	Andrew Gregg	D–R	Yea	Yea	Yea	Yea	Yea	Yea	Yea	Yea	Yea
Virginia 12	Thomas Griffin	F	Nay	Nay	Nay	Nay	Nay	Nay	Nay	Nay	Nay
New York 15	Gaylord Griswold	F	Nay	Nay	Nay	Nay	Nay	Nay	Nay	Nay	Nay
Connecticut at-large (seat D)	Roger Griswold	F	Nay	Nay	Nay	Nay	Nay	Nay	Nay	Nay	Nay
Georgia at-large (seat D)	Samuel Hammond	D–R	Absent	Absent	Absent	Absent	Absent	Absent	Absent	Absent	Absent
South Carolina 4	Wade Hampton I	D–R	Absent	Absent	Absent	Absent	Absent	Absent	Absent	Absent	Absent
Pennsylvania 4 (seat B)	John A. Hanna	D–R	Absent	Absent	Absent	Absent	Absent	Absent	Absent	Absent	Absent
New York 7	Josiah Hasbrouck	D–R	Yea	Yea	Yea	Yea	Yea	Yea	Yea	Yea	Yea
Massachusetts 10	Seth Hastings	F	Nay	Nay	Nay	Nay	Nay	Nay	Nay	Nay	Nay
New Jersey at-large (seat C)	William Helms	D–R	Absent	Absent	Absent	Absent	Absent	Absent	Absent	Absent	Absent
Pennsylvania 3 (seat A)	Joseph Hiester	D–R	Yea	Yea	Yea	Yea	Yea	Yea	Yea	Yea	Yea
Pennsylvania 10	William Hoge	D–R	Absent	Absent	Absent	Absent	Absent	Absent	Absent	Absent	Absent
North Carolina 11	James Holland	D–R	Yea	Yea	Yea	Yea	Nay	Yea	Yea	Yea	Yea
Virginia 4	David Holmes	D–R	Yea	Yea	Yea	Yea	Yea	Yea	Yea	Yea	Yea
New Hampshire at-large (seat D)	David Hough	F	Nay	Nay	Nay	Nay	Nay	Nay	Nay	Nay	Absent
South Carolina 3	Benjamin Huger	F	Absent	Absent	Absent	Absent	Absent	Absent	Absent	Absent	Absent
New Hampshire at-large (seat B)	Samuel Hunt	F	Nay	Nay	Nay	Nay	Nay	Nay	Nay	Nay	Nay
Virginia 1	John G. Jackson	D–R	Yea	Yea	Yea	Yea	Nay	Absent	Yea	Yea	Yea
Virginia 8	Walter Jones	D–R	Yea	Yea	Yea	Yea	Yea	Yea	Absent	Absent	Absent
North Carolina 3	William Kennedy	D–R	Yea	Yea	Yea	Yea	Nay	Yea	Yea	Nay	Yea
Rhode Island at-large (seat B)	Nehemiah Knight	D–R	Yea	Yea	Yea	Yea	Yea	Yea	Yea	Yea	Yea
Massachusetts 12	Simon Larned	D–R	Yea	Yea	Yea	Yea	Yea	Yea	Yea	Yea	Yea
Pennsylvania 1 (seat C)	Michael Leib	D–R	Yea	Yea	Yea	Yea	Yea	Yea	Yea	Yea	Yea
Virginia 7	Joseph Lewis Jr.	F	Nay	Nay	Nay	Nay	Nay	Nay	Nay	Nay	Nay
New York 8	Henry W. Livingston	F	Nay	Nay	Nay	Nay	Nay	Nay	Nay	Nay	Nay
South Carolina 1	Thomas Lowndes	F	Nay	Nay	Nay	Nay	Nay	Nay	Nay	Absent	Absent
Pennsylvania 11	John Baptiste Charles Lucas	D–R	Yea	Yea	Yea	Yea	Yea	Yea	Yea	Yea	Yea
Kentucky 1	Matthew Lyon	D–R	Absent	Absent	Absent	Absent	Absent	Yea	Absent	Yea	Yea
North Carolina 6	Nathaniel Macon	D–R	Did not vote (speaker)^{α}								
New York 5	Andrew McCord	D–R	Yea	Yea	Yea	Yea	Yea	Yea	Yea	Yea	Yea
Maryland 5 (seat B)	William McCreery	D–R	Yea	Yea	Yea	Yea	Nay	Nay	Yea	Yea	Yea
Georgia at-large (seat A)	David Meriwether	D–R	Yea	Yea	Yea	Yea	Yea	Yea	Yea	Yea	Yea
Massachusetts 7	Nahum Mitchell	F	Nay	Nay	Nay	Nay	Nay	Nay	Nay	Nay	Nay
Maryland 5 (seat A)	Nicholas Ruxton Moore	D–R	Yea	Yea	Yea	Yea	Yea	Yea	Yea	Yea	Yea
South Carolina 7	Thomas Moore	D–R	Yea	Yea	Yea	Yea	Yea	Yea	Yea	Yea	Yea
Ohio at-large	Jeremiah Morrow	D–R	Yea	Yea	Yea	Yea	Yea	Yea	Yea	Yea	Yea
New Jersey at-large (seat D)	James Mott	D–R	Yea	Nay	Yea	Yea	Nay	Nay	Nay	Nay	Nay
Maryland 4	Roger Nelson	D–R	Yea	Yea	Yea	Yea	Yea	Yea	Yea	Yea	Yea
Virginia 11	Anthony New	D–R	Yea	Yea	Yea	Yea	Yea	Yea	Yea	Yea	Yea
Virginia 20	Thomas Newton Jr.	D–R	Yea	Yea	Yea	Yea	Yea	Yea	Yea	Yea	Yea
Maryland 7	Joseph Hopper Nicholson	D–R	Yea	Yea	Yea	Yea	Yea	Yea	Yea	Yea	Yea
Vermont 1	Gideon Olin	D–R	Yea	Yea	Yea	Yea	Yea	Yea	Yea	Yea	Yea
New York 11	Beriah Palmer	D–R	Yea	Yea	Yea	Yea	Yea	Yea	Yea	Yea	Yea
New York 16	John Paterson	D–R	Yea	Yea	Absent	Yea	Yea	Absent	Absent	Yea	Yea
New York 17	Oliver Phelps	D–R	Absent	Absent	Absent	Absent	Absent	Absent	Absent	Absent	Absent
Maryland 3	Thomas Plater	F	Nay	Nay	Nay	Nay	Nay	Nay	Nay	Nay	Nay
North Carolina 7	Samuel D. Purviance	F	Nay	Nay	Nay	Nay	Nay	Nay	Nay	Nay	Absent
Virginia 15	John Randolph of Roanoke	D–R	Yea	Yea	Yea	Yea	Yea	Yea	Yea	Yea	Yea
Virginia 21	Thomas Mann Randolph Jr.	D–R	Yea	Yea	Yea	Yea	Yea	Yea	Yea	Yea	Yea
Pennsylvania 7	John Rea	D–R	Yea	Yea	Yea	Yea	Yea	Yea	Yea	Yea	Yea
Tennessee 1	John Rhea	D–R	Yea	Yea	Yea	Yea	Yea	Yea	Yea	Yea	Yea
Pennsylvania 1 (seat B)	Jacob Richards	D–R	Absent	Absent	Absent	Absent	Absent	Absent	Absent	Absent	Absent
New York 1	Samuel Riker	D–R	Yea	Yea	Yea	Yea	Yea	Yea	Yea	Yea	Yea
Delaware at-large	Caesar Augustus Rodney	D–R	Yea	Yea	Yea	Yea	Nay	Nay	Yea	Yea	Yea
New York 14	Erastus Root	D–R	Yea	Yea	Yea	Yea	Nay	Nay	Yea	Yea	Yea
New York 13	Thomas Sammons	D–R	Yea	Yea	Yea	Yea	Yea	Yea	Yea	Yea	Yea
Kentucky 4	Thomas Sandford	D–R	Yea	Yea	Yea	Yea	Yea	Yea	Yea	Yea	Yea
New York 2	Joshua Sands	F	Absent	Absent	Absent	Absent	Absent	Absent	Absent	Absent	Absent
Massachusetts 13	Ebenezer Seaver	D–R	Yea	Yea	Yea	Yea	Yea	Yea	Yea	Yea	Yea
New Jersey at-large (seat F)	James Sloan	D–R	Yea	Yea	Yea	Yea	Yea	Yea	Yea	Yea	Yea
Pennsylvania 9	John Smilie	D–R	Yea	Yea	Yea	Yea	Yea	Yea	Yea	Yea	Yea
Virginia 3	John Smith	D–R	Nay	Nay	Nay	Nay	Nay	Nay	Nay	Nay	Nay
Connecticut at-large (seat C)	John Cotton Smith	F	Nay	Nay	Nay	Nay	Nay	Nay	Nay	Nay	Nay
New Jersey at-large (seat E)	Henry Southard	D–R	Yea	Yea	Yea	Yea	Yea	Yea	Yea	Yea	Yea
North Carolina 8	Richard Stanford	D–R	Yea	Yea	Yea	Yea	Yea	Yea	Yea	Yea	Yea
Rhode Island at-large (seat A)	Joseph Stanton Jr.	D–R	Yea	Yea	Yea	Yea	Nay	Yea	Yea	Yea	Yea
Massachusetts 11	William Stedman	F	Nay	Nay	Nay	Nay	Nay	Nay	Nay	Nay	Nay
Virginia 2	James Stephenson	F	Nay	Nay	Nay	Nay	Nay	Nay	Nay	Nay	Nay
Pennsylvania 6	John Stewart	D–R	Absent	Yea	Yea	Yea	Yea	Yea	Yea	Yea	Yea
Massachusetts 6	Samuel Taggart	F	Nay	Nay	Nay	Nay	Nay	Nay	Nay	Nay	Nay
Connecticut at-large (seat A)	Benjamin Tallmadge	F	Nay	Nay	Nay	Nay	Nay	Nay	Nay	Nay	Nay
New Hampshire at-large (seat C)	Samuel Tenney	F	Nay	Nay	Nay	Nay	Nay	Nay	Nay	Nay	Nay
Massachusetts 16	Samuel Thatcher	F	Nay	Nay	Nay	Nay	Nay	Nay	Nay	Nay	Nay
New York 12	David Thomas	D–R	Yea	Yea	Yea	Yea	Yea	Yea	Yea	Yea	Yea
Virginia 9	Philip R. Thompson	D–R	Yea	Yea	Yea	Yea	Yea	Yea	Yea	Yea	Yea
New York 10	George Tibbits	F	Nay	Nay	Nay	Nay	Nay	Nay	Nay	Nay	Nay
Virginia 6	Abram Trigg	D–R	Yea	Yea	Yea	Yea	Yea	Yea	Yea	Yea	Absent
New York 4	Philip Van Cortlandt	D–R	Absent	Absent	Absent	Absent	Absent	Absent	Absent	Absent	Absent
Pennsylvania 2 (seat C)	Isaac Van Horne	D–R	Yea	Yea	Yea	Yea	Yea	Yea	Yea	Yea	Yea
New York 9	Killian K. Van Rensselaer	F	Absent	Absent	Absent	Absent	Absent	Absent	Absent	Absent	Absent
Massachusetts 4	Joseph Bradley Varnum	D–R	Yea	Yea	Yea	Yea	Yea	Yea	Yea	Yea	Yea
New York 6	Daniel C. Verplanck	D–R	Absent	Absent	Absent	Absent	Absent	Absent	Absent	Absent	Absent
Massachusetts 15	Peleg Wadsworth	F	Nay	Nay	Nay	Nay	Nay	Nay	Nay	Nay	Nay
Kentucky 3	Matthew Walton	D–R	Absent	Absent	Absent	Absent	Absent	Absent	Absent	Absent	Absent
Pennsylvania 3 (seat C)	John Whitehill	D–R	Yea	Yea	Yea	Yea	Yea	Yea	Yea	Yea	Yea
Massachusetts 8	Lemuel Williams	F	Absent	Absent	Absent	Absent	Absent	Absent	Absent	Absent	Absent
North Carolina 9	Marmaduke Williams	D–R	Yea	Yea	Yea	Yea	Nay	Nay	Nay	Nay	Yea
Virginia 5	Alexander Wilson	D–R	Yea	Yea	Yea	Yea	Yea	Yea	Yea	Yea	Yea
South Carolina 5	Richard Winn	D–R	Yea	Yea	Yea	Yea	Yea	Yea	Yea	Yea	Yea
North Carolina 12	Joseph Winston	D–R	Yea	Yea	Yea	Yea	Yea	Yea	Yea	Yea	Yea
North Carolina 1	Thomas Wynns	D–R	Yea	Yea	Yea	Yea	Yea	Yea	Yea	Yea	Yea
Notes:^α Nathaniel Macon was serving as Speaker of the House. Per House rules, "the Speaker is not required to vote in ordinary legislative proceedings, except when such vote would be decisive or when the House is engaged in voting by ballot."

== Appointment of House managers ==
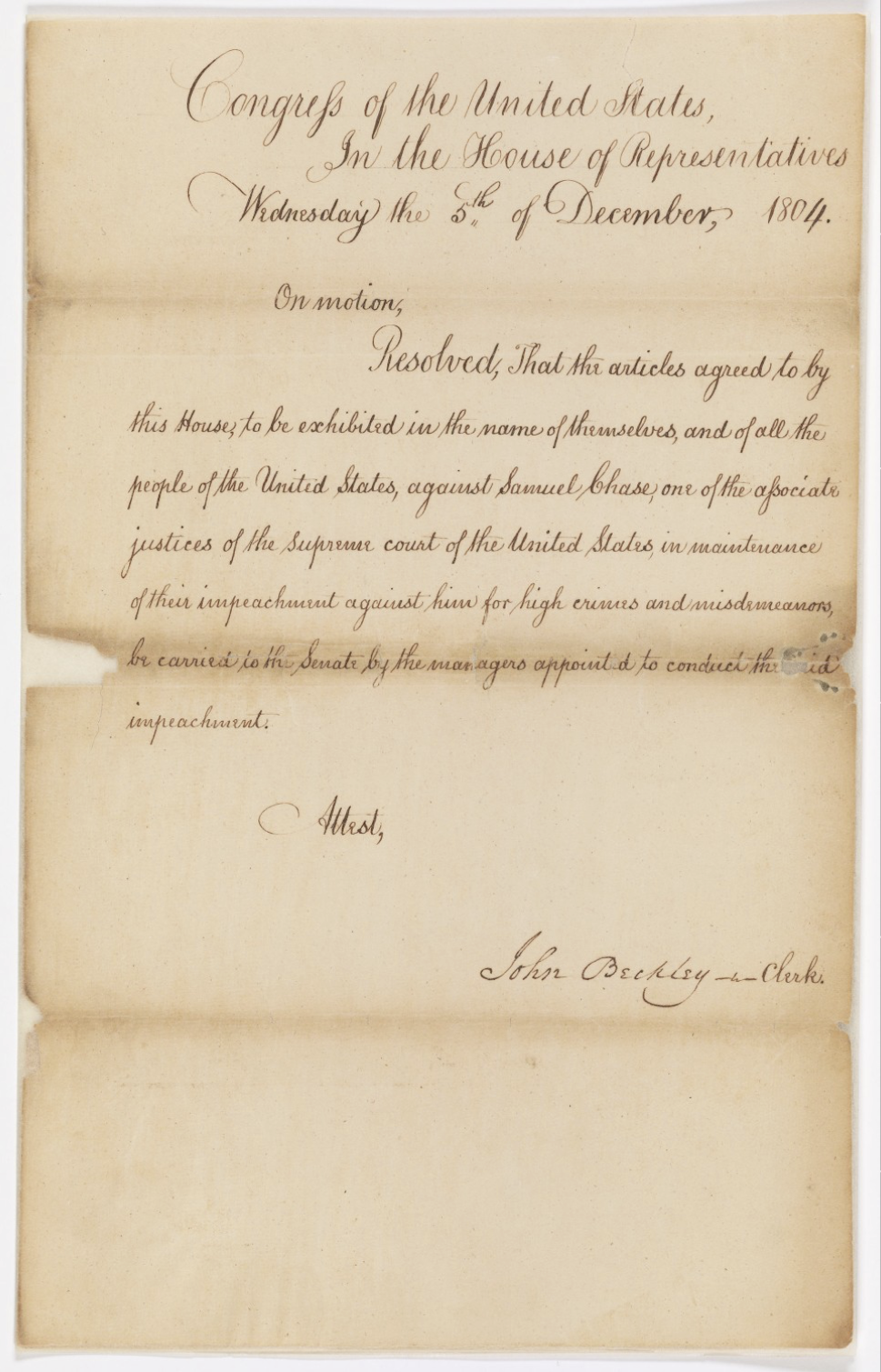
House resolution passed on December 5, 1804, ordering for the impeachment managers to carry the articles of impeachment to the Senate and display them

After adopting the eight articles of impeachment, the House considered a motion to appoint by ballot the House managers that would act as the prosecution in the impeachment trial before the Senate. However, a vote on this motion was postponed until the following day. On December 5, 1804, the House approved the motion and voted by ballot to appoint seven house managers. On the first ballot, six individuals met the required majority of votes to be selected as managers (John Boyle, Peter Early, Roger Nelson, Joseph Hopper Nicholson, John Randolph of Roanoke, and Caesar Augustus Rodney). Thereafter, a second ballot was held to fill the final slot. Nobody received the needed majority in this round. Speaker Nathaniel Macon opined that, per a House standing rule related to such a situation on a second ballot that he believed was applicable, the individual with the greatest plurality should be considered duly elected. As George W. Campbell had the greatest plurality on the second ballot, it was Speaker Macon's opinion that Campbell was therefore duly elected the seventh impeachment manager. However, two congressmen appealed the speaker's decision, and the House voted that the Speaker Macon's decision not to be "in order". Therefore, a third ballot was held. On with ballot, Campbell received the required majority of the vote, and was therefore elected as the seventh manager. All seven members individuals were members of the Democratic–Republican party. After the election of the impeachment managers, the House approved a motion ordering for the managers to bring the articles before the Senate. After this, a motion was approved ordering for a message to be sent by the clerk of the United States House of Representatives to the Senate to notify them that the House had appointed the impeachment managers and had directed them to carry the articles to the Senate. On December 6, 1804, Roger Nelson declined his appointment to be an impeachment manager, as he would have to absent from Washington, D.C. during the trial. Nelson was replaced with Christopher H. Clark. During the tiral, Randolph served as the chairman and main spokesman of the impeachment managers.

== Impeachment as a campaign issue in the 1804 elections ==
In late 1804, ahead of the 1804 United States elections, Federalist Senator John Quincy Adams warned voters in his state of Massachusetts that a strong result for Federalists was the only means through which voters could curtail what he warned was an intended crusade by Democratic–Republicans to target federal judges for removal.

== Senate trial ==
The Senate was controlled by Jeffersonian Democratic-Republicans at the time of the trial. With a 25–9 majority, they had a two-thirds supermajority hypothetically capable of securing Chase's conviction in even a party-line vote.

=== Arguments made ===
The case presented by the prosecution was twofold. They argued that impeachment was a process through which the Senate was allowed to remove officers such as Chase at their own prerogative, and no grounds were therefore required to be proven in the impeachment trial. They alternatively, for those unconvinced by this, presented other argument aimed at proving that Chase had committed content that constituted a high crime or misdemeanor worthy of removal from office. As an impeachment manager, Randolph argued to the Senate, "[Chase] stands charged with having sinned against his law and against his sacred oath, by acting in his judicial capacity unfaithfully, partially, and with respect to persons."

The defense argued that the constitution only intended impeachment to be for charges related to accusations of a civil officer having committed an indictable crime. It began with remarks by Robert Goodloe Harper on February 15, 1805. The defense called 32 witnesses in their presentation. Arguing for the defense, Joseph Hopkinson asserted an interpretation of the Constitutional prescription of impeachment being allowed for treason, bribery, or other high crimes and misdemeanors which held that, under the constitution, "No judge can be impeached and removed from office for any act or offense for which he could not be indicted." He argued that Congress could not, on their own accord, decide what constituted impeachable conduct, but rather, had to heed this interpretation of the Constitution. He declared that while the House of impeachment, "had the power of impeachment", that, "what they are to impeach in what cases they may exercise this delegated power depends on...the Constitution, and not on their opinion, whim, or caprice." He outlined an argument for the value of an independent judiciary, and further argued that removal for the circumstances that Chase was being impeached for would undermine judicial independence, asking,

[I]f a judge is forever to be exposed to prosecutions and impeachment for his official conduct, on mere suggestions of caprice, and to be condemned by the mere voice of prejudice...can he hold that firm and steady hand his high functions required?

After Joseph Hopkinson's presentation, Philip Barton Key and Charles Lee next spoke on February 22, 1805. On February 23, 1805, Luther Martin spoke. In his remarks, Luther Martin, who had been a delegate to United States Constitutional Convention himself, declared,

The principle I have endeavored to establish is that no judge or other officer can, under the Constitution of the United States, be removed from office but by impeachment, and for the violation of some law, which the violation must not simply be a crime or misdemeanor, but a high crime or misdemeanor.

Martin defended Chase's conduct in the Fries trial and the Callender trial. Martin defended some of the specific behavior of Chase's that had been under attack by the prosecution. He justified Chase's judicial conduct in the Callender trial, including examining the Sedition law that was in question itself. Martin conceded that Chase had, occasionally, been overly influenced by his personal emotions, but argued that this behavior was,

Rather a violation of the principles of politeness, than of the principles of law; rather the want of decorum than the commission of a high crime and misdemeanor.

Martin argued that impeachment was being used in a partisan manner, which threatened the integrity of the judiciary by placing it under discipline by a political party. For the defense, Robert Goodloe Harper argued,

An impeachment is not a mere inquiry, in the nature of an inquest of office, whether an officer be qualified for his place, or whether some reason of policy or expediency may not demand his removal, but a criminal prosecution, for the support of which the proof of some willful violation of a known law of the land is known to be indispensably required.

=== Verdict ===
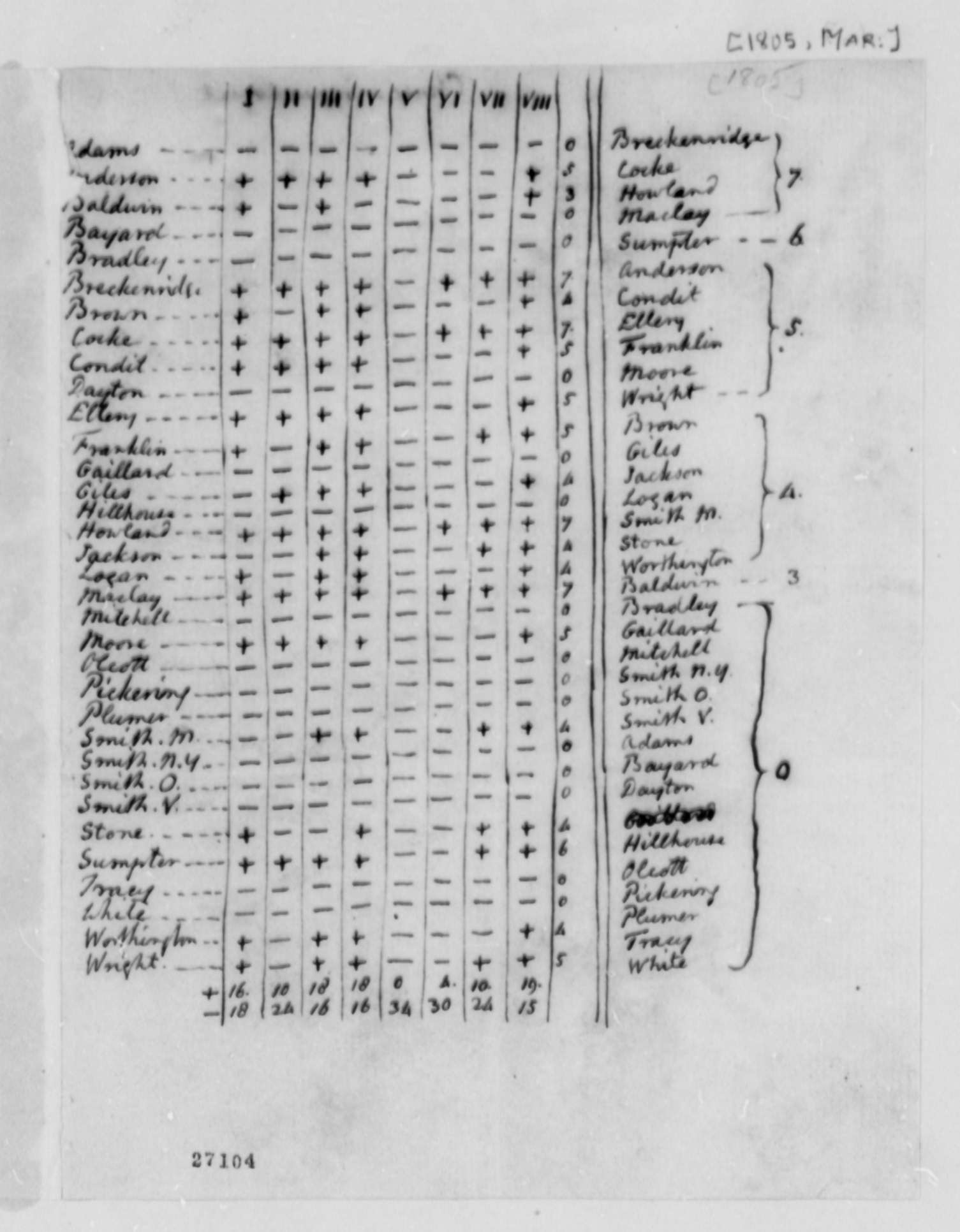
Tally of the verdict

The Senate convened on March 1, 1805, to vote on verdicts for each of the articles. With 25 members, the Democratic–Republicans had enough votes on their own to hypothetically convict Chase. However, the Senate voted to acquit Chase of all charges, with each articles seeing at least six Democratic–Republican senators joining all Federalist senators in voting to acquit.

There were 34 senators (25 Democratic-Republicans and 9 Federalists). Therefore, with all senators voting, 23 "guilty" votes were needed to reach the required two-thirds majority for conviction/removal from office. No articles reached this threshold. The article that received the most guilty votes (Article VIII) still fell four votes short of a two-thirds majority for conviction.

Articles of Impeachment, U.S. Senate judgment (A two-thirds "guilty" margin necessary for a conviction)
March 1, 1805 Article I	Party		Total votes
March 1, 1805 Article I	Federalist	Democratic-Republican	Total votes
Yea (guilty)	0	16	16
Nay (not guilty)	9	9	18
March 1, 1805 Article II	Party		Total votes
March 1, 1805 Article II	Federalist	Democratic-Republican	Total votes
Yea (guilty)	0	10	10
Nay (not guilty)	9	15	24
March 1, 1805 Article III	Party		Total votes
March 1, 1805 Article III	Federalist	Democratic-Republican	Total votes
Yea (guilty)	0	18	18
Nay (Not guilty)	9	7	16
March 1, 1805 Article IV	Party		Total votes
March 1, 1805 Article IV	Federalist	Democratic-Republican	Total votes
Yea (guilty)	0	18	18
Nay (Not guilty)	9	7	16
March 1, 1805 Article V	Party		Total votes
March 1, 1805 Article V	Federalist	Democratic-Republican	Total votes
Yea (guilty)	0	0	0
Nay (Not guilty)	9	25	34
March 1, 1805 Article VI	Party		Total votes
March 1, 1805 Article VI	Federalist	Democratic-Republican	Total votes
Yea (guilty)	0	4	4
Nay (Not guilty)	9	19	30
March 1, 1805 Article VII	Party		Total votes
March 1, 1805 Article VII	Federalist	Democratic-Republican	Total votes
Yea (guilty)	0	10	10
Nay (Not guilty)	9	15	24
March 1, 1805 Article VIII	Party		Total votes
March 1, 1805 Article VIII	Federalist	Democratic-Republican	Total votes
Yea (guilty)	0	19	19
Nay (Not guilty)	9	6	15
Detail of roll call: Senator / Party / State / Art. I vote / Art. II vote / Art. III vote / Art. IV vote / Art. V vote / Art. VI vote / Art. VII vote / Art. VIII vote; John Quincy Adams / F / MA / Nay / Nay / Nay / Nay / Nay / Nay / Nay / Nay; Joseph Anderson / D–R / TN / Yea / Yea / Yea / Yea / Nay / Nay / Nay / Yea; Abraham Baldwin / D–R / GA / Yea / Nay / Yea / Nay / Nay / Nay / Nay / Yea; James A. Bayard / F / DE / Nay / Nay / Nay / Nay / Nay / Nay / Nay / Nay; Stephen R. Bradley / D–R / VT / Nay / Nay / Nay / Nay / Nay / Nay / Nay / Nay; John Breckinridge / D–R / KY / Yea / Yea / Yea / Yea / Nay / Yea / Yea / Yea; John Brown / D–R / KY / Yea / Nay / Yea / Yea / Nay / Nay / Nay / Yea; William Cocke / D–R / TN / Yea / Yea / Yea / Yea / Nay / Yea / Yea / Yea; John Condit / D–R / NJ / Yea / Yea / Yea / Yea / Nay / Nay / Nay / Yea; Jonathan Dayton / F / NJ / Nay / Nay / Nay / Nay / Nay / Nay / Nay / Nay; Christopher Ellery / D–R / RI / Yea / Yea / Yea / Yea / Nay / Nay / Nay / Yea; Jesse Franklin / D–R / NC / Yea / Nay / Yea / Yea / Nay / Nay / Yea / Yea; John Gaillard / D–R / SC / Nay / Nay / Nay / Nay / Nay / Nay / Nay / Nay; William Branch Giles / D–R / VA / Nay / Yea / Yea / Yea / Nay / Nay / Nay / Yea; James Hillhouse / F / CT / Nay / Nay / Nay / Nay / Nay / Nay / Nay / Nay; Benjamin Howland / D–R / RI / Yea / Yea / Yea / Yea / Nay / Yea / Yea / Yea; James Jackson / D–R / GA / Nay / Nay / Yea / Yea / Nay / Nay / Yea / Yea; George Logan / D–R / PA / Yea / Nay / Yea / Yea / Nay / Nay / Nay / Yea; Samuel Maclay / D–R / PA / Yea / Yea / Yea / Yea / Nay / Yea / Yea / Yea; Samuel L. Mitchill / D–R / NY / Nay / Nay / Nay / Nay / Nay / Nay / Nay / Nay; Andrew Moore / D–R / VA / Yea / Yea / Yea / Yea / Nay / Nay / Nay / Yea; Simeon Olcott / F / NH / Nay / Nay / Nay / Nay / Nay / Nay / Nay / Nay; Timothy Pickering / F / MA / Nay / Nay / Nay / Nay / Nay / Nay / Nay / Nay; William Plumer / F / NH / Nay / Nay / Nay / Nay / Nay / Nay / Nay / Nay; Israel Smith / D–R / VT / Nay / Nay / Nay / Nay / Nay / Nay / Nay / Nay; John Smith / D–R / NY / Nay / Nay / Nay / Nay / Nay / Nay / Nay / Nay; John Smith / D–R / OH / Nay / Nay / Nay / Nay / Nay / Nay / Nay / Nay; Samuel Smith / D–R / MD / Nay / Nay / Yea / Yea / Nay / Nay / Yea / Yea; David Stone / D–R / NC / Yea / Nay / Nay / Yea / Nay / Nay / Yea / Yea; Thomas Sumter / D–R / SC / Yea / Yea / Yea / Yea / Nay / Nay / Yea / Yea; Uriah Tracy / F / CT / Nay / Nay / Nay / Nay / Nay / Nay / Nay / Nay; Samuel White / F / DE / Nay / Nay / Nay / Nay / Nay / Nay / Nay / Nay; Thomas Worthington / D–R / OH / Yea / Nay / Yea / Yea / Nay / Nay / Nay / Yea; Robert Wright / D–R / MD / Yea / Nay / Yea / Yea / Nay / Nay / Yea / Yea; Sources:

== Aftermath ==
=== Immediate aftermath ===
Chase remained on the court until his June 1811 death. The acquittal of Chase handed a political defeat to Thomas Jefferson. Jefferson would have possibly moved next to impeach Chief Justice John Marshall had the Senate convicted Chase.

The failure of the Democratic–Republicans in the United States Congress to remove Chase followed the failure of the Democratic–Republicans to remove all three Federalist justices of the Pennsylvania Supreme Court (Edward Shippen IV and Thomas Smith, Jasper Yeates) that had been similarly impeached on political grounds on March 23, 1804, Democratic–Republican-led Pennsylvania House of Representatives but acquitted in their impeachment trial before the Pennsylvania Senate in the vote held on January 28, 1805. Not willing to surrender defeat, some Democratic–Republicans in both the federal government and state judiciaries turned their attention to amending their constitutions. John Randolph of Roanoke appeared on the House floor the very afternoon to propose and amendment to the United States Constitution that would allow the president, upon the request of both Houses of congress, to remove any federal judge. Joseph Hopper Nicholson proposed a Constitutional amendment that would allow for state legislatures to recall (remove) senators for any reason. In the Pennsylvania state legislature, amendments to the state constitution were proposed that would allow judges to be removed by a simple majority vote, make the threshold for an impeachment conviction a simple majority, and have judges hold terms of years rather than lifetime appointments. A major issue of the 1805 Pennsylvania gubernatorial election would be the prospect of a holding a state constitutional convention.

=== Legacy ===
Chase is the only U.S. Supreme Court justice that has ever been impeached. The impeachment raised constitutional questions over the nature of the judiciary and was the end of a series of efforts to define the appropriate extent of judicial independence under the Constitution. It set the unofficial limits of the impeachment power, fixed the concept that the judiciary was prohibited from engaging in partisan politics, defined the role of the judge in a criminal jury trial, and clarified judicial independence. The construction was largely attitudinal, as it modified political norms without codifying new legal doctrines.

The acquittal of Chase (by lopsided margins on several of the counts) set an unofficial precedent that many historians say helped ensure the independence of the judiciary. Historian Adam A. Perlin has opined that the House-appointed impeachment managers sought to expand the ability of Congress to, "create offenses at their will and pleasure," and argued that a conviction of Chase would have led to Congress being able to remove judges for purely political purposes. In 1992, then Chief Justice William Rehnquist noted in his book Grand Inquests that some senators declined to convict Chase despite their partisan hostility to him, apparently because they doubted that the mere quality of his judging was grounds for removal. All impeachments of federal judges since Chase have been based on allegations of legal or ethical misconduct, not on judicial performance. For their part, federal judges since that time have generally been much more cautious than Chase in trying to avoid the appearance of political partisanship.

While the impeachment was a major event at the time it took place, it has since been relegated to relative historical obscurity in both the general public consciousness and even in terms of scholarly coverage.
