= 8th United States Congress =

1803-1805 U.S. Congress

←	7th	9th	→
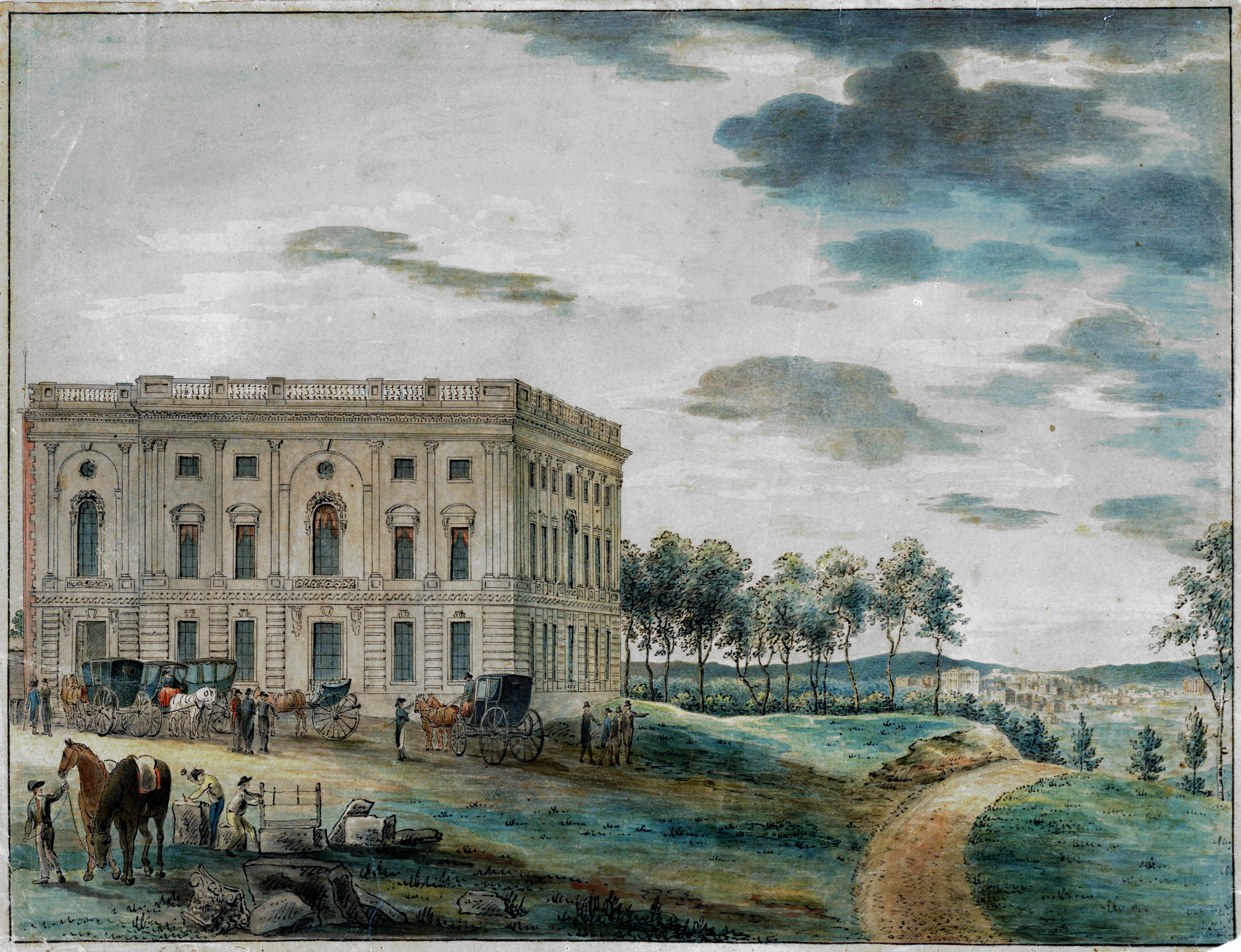
- United States Capitol (1800)

Overview
- Legislative body: United States Congress
- Jurisdiction: United States
- Term: March 4, 1803 – March 4, 1805

Senate
- Members: 34
- President: Aaron Burr (DR)
- President pro tempore: John Brown (DR); Jesse Franklin (DR); Joseph Anderson (DR)
- Party control: Democratic-Republican

House of Representatives
- Members: 142 representatives 1 non-voting delegates
- Speaker: Nathaniel Macon (DR)
- Party control: Democratic-Republican

Sessions
- 1st: October 17, 1803 – March 27, 1804
- 2nd: November 5, 1804 – March 3, 1805

The 8th United States Congress was a meeting of the legislative branch of the United States federal government, consisting of the United States Senate and the United States House of Representatives. It met in Washington, D.C. from March 4, 1803, to March 4, 1805, during the last two years of Thomas Jefferson's first term in office. The apportionment of seats in the House of Representatives was based on the 1800 United States census. Both chambers had a Democratic-Republican majority.

== Major events ==
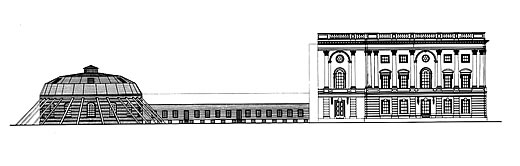
United States Capitol with "Brick Oven"

- April 30, 1803: The Louisiana Purchase was made by the United States from France
- February 16, 1804: In the First Barbary War, Stephen Decatur led a raid to burn the pirate-held frigate Philadelphia
- May 14, 1804: Lewis and Clark Expedition departed from Camp Dubois to begin their historic journey by traveling up the Missouri River
- July 11, 1804: Aaron Burr killed Alexander Hamilton
- November 30, 1804: Impeachment trial of Supreme Court Justice Samuel Chase
- December 3, 1804: 1804 United States presidential election: Incumbent Thomas Jefferson (DR) beat challenger Charles Cotesworth Pinckney (F)
- March 1, 1805: Samuel Chase acquitted of impeachment charges by the U.S. Senate

== Constitutional amendments ==
- December 9, 1803: Approved an amendment to the United States Constitution providing a new procedure for electing the President and Vice President, and submitted it to the state legislatures for ratification 2 Stat. 306
  - June 15, 1804: Twelfth Amendment was ratified by the requisite number of states (then 13) to become part of the Constitution

== Treaties ==
- October 20, 1803: Senate ratified the Louisiana Purchase Treaty

== Territories organized ==
- March 26, 1804: Territory of Orleans was organized from the portion of the Louisiana Purchase south of the 33rd parallel; the portion north of the 33rd parallel was organized as the District of Louisiana. 2 Stat. 283
- January 11, 1805: Michigan Territory was organized. 2 Stat. 309
- March 3, 1805: Louisiana Territory was organized from the District of Louisiana. 2 Stat. 331

== Party summary ==
The count below identifies party affiliations at the beginning of the first session of this Congress, and includes members from vacancies and newly admitted states, when they were first seated. Changes resulting from subsequent replacements are shown below in the "Changes in membership" section.

=== Senate ===
	Party (shading shows control)		Total	Vacant
	Democratic- Republican (DR)	Federalist (F)	Total	Vacant
End of previous congress	18	14	32	2
Begin	21	9	30	4
End	25	9	34	0
Final voting share	73.5%	26.5%		
Beginning of next congress	27	7	34	0

=== House of Representatives ===
Following the 1800 census, the size of the House was increased to 142 seats from 108.

	Party (shading shows control)		Total	Vacant
	Democratic- Republican (DR)	Federalist (F)	Total	Vacant
End of previous congress	64	41	105	3
Begin	100	39	139	3
End	101	39	140	2
Final voting share	72.1%	27.9%		
Beginning of next congress	113	26	139	3

== Leadership ==
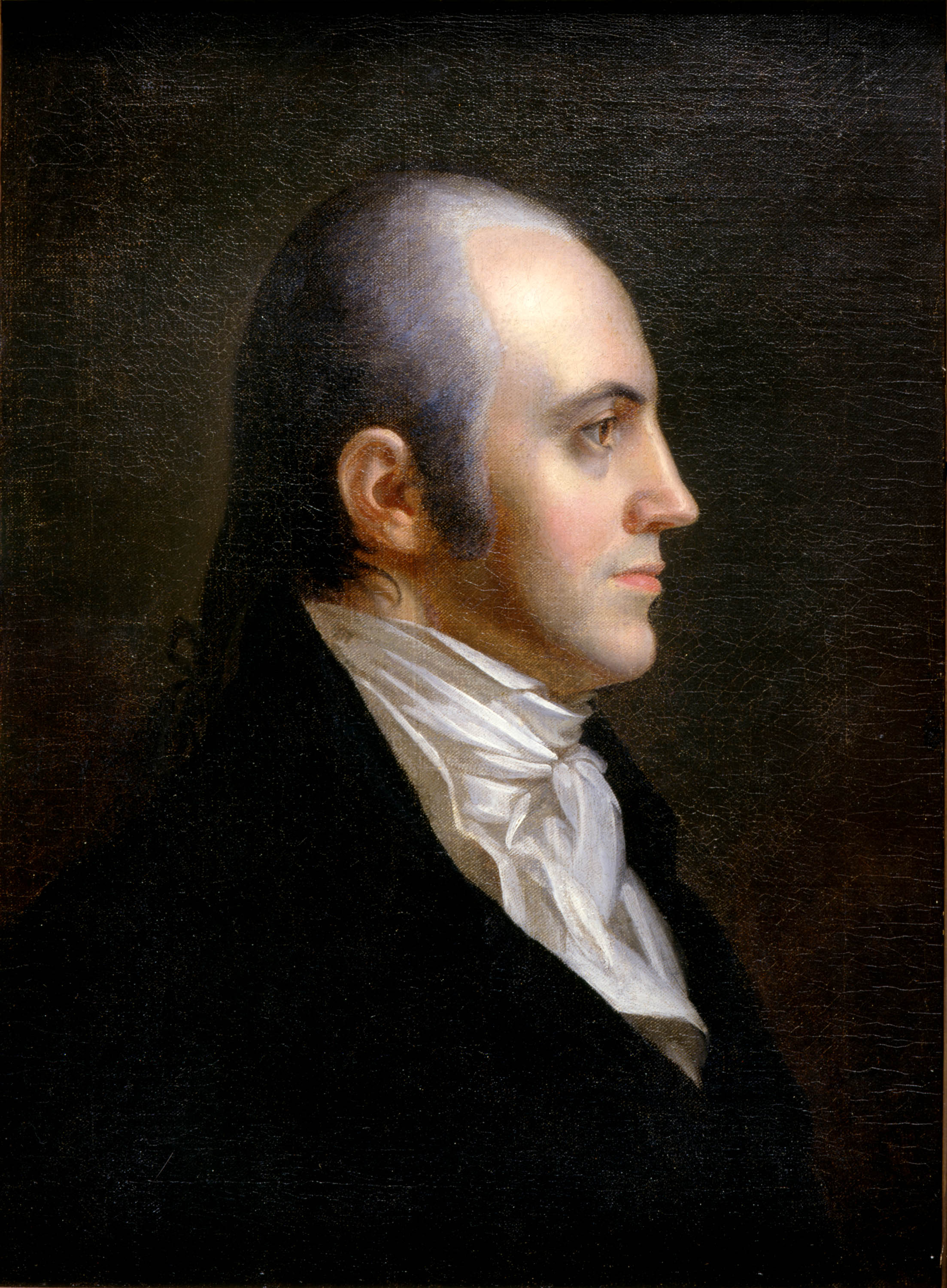
President of the Senate Aaron Burr

=== Senate ===
- President: Aaron Burr (DR)
- President pro tempore: Stephen R. Bradley (DR), March 4, 1803-October 16, 1803
  - John Brown (DR), October 17, 1803 – February 26, 1804
  - Jesse Franklin (DR), March 10, 1804 – November 4, 1804
  - Joseph Anderson (DR), January 15, 1805 – December 1, 1805

=== House of Representatives ===
- Speaker: Nathaniel Macon (DR)

== Members ==
This list is arranged by chamber, then by state. Senators are listed in order of seniority, and representatives are listed by district.

Skip to House of Representatives, below

=== Senate ===
Senators were elected by the state legislatures every two years, with one-third beginning new six-year terms with each Congress. Preceding the names in the list below are Senate class numbers, which indicate the cycle of their election. In this Congress, Class 1 meant their term began with this Congress, requiring reelection in 1808; Class 2 meant their term ended in this Congress, requiring reelection in 1804; and Class 3 meant their term began in the last Congress, requiring reelection in 1806.

==== Connecticut ====
▌1. James Hillhouse (F)
▌3. Uriah Tracy (F)

==== Delaware ====
▌1. Samuel White (F)
▌2. William H. Wells (F), until November 6, 1804

▌James A. Bayard (F), from November 13, 1804

==== Georgia ====
▌2. Abraham Baldwin (DR)
▌3. James Jackson (DR)

==== Kentucky ====
▌2. John Brown (DR)
▌3. John Breckinridge (DR)

==== Maryland ====
▌1. Samuel Smith (DR)
▌3. Robert Wright (DR)

==== Massachusetts ====
▌1. John Quincy Adams (F)
▌2. Timothy Pickering (F)

==== New Hampshire ====
▌2. Simeon Olcott (F)
▌3. William Plumer (F)

==== New Jersey ====
▌1. John Condit (DR), from September 1, 1803
▌2. Jonathan Dayton (F)

==== New York ====
▌1. Theodorus Bailey (DR), until January 16, 1804

▌John Armstrong Jr. (DR), February 25, 1804 – June 30, 1804
▌Samuel L. Mitchill (DR), from November 23, 1804

▌3. DeWitt Clinton (DR), until November 4, 1803

▌John Armstrong Jr. (DR), December 7, 1803 – February 23, 1804
▌John Smith (DR), from February 23, 1804

==== North Carolina ====
▌2. Jesse Franklin (DR)
▌3. David Stone (DR)

==== Ohio ====
▌1. John Smith (DR), from April 1, 1803
▌3. Thomas Worthington (DR), from April 1, 1803

==== Pennsylvania ====
▌1. Samuel Maclay (DR)
▌3. George Logan (DR)

==== Rhode Island ====
▌1. Samuel J. Potter (DR), until October 14, 1804

▌Benjamin Howland (DR), from October 29, 1804

▌2. Christopher Ellery (DR)

==== South Carolina ====
▌2. Thomas Sumter (DR)
▌3. Pierce Butler (DR), resigned November 21, 1804

▌John Gaillard (DR), from December 6, 1804

==== Tennessee ====
▌1. Joseph Anderson (DR), from September 22, 1803
▌2. William Cocke (DR)

==== Vermont ====
▌1. Israel Smith (DR)
▌3. Stephen R. Bradley (DR)

==== Virginia ====
▌1. Stevens Mason (DR), until May 10, 1803

▌John Taylor of Caroline (DR), June 4, 1803 – December 7, 1803
▌Abraham B. Venable (DR), December 7, 1803 – June 7, 1804
▌William B. Giles (DR), August 11, 1804 - December 4, 1804
▌Andrew Moore (DR), from December 4, 1804

▌2. Wilson C. Nicholas (DR), until May 22, 1804

▌Andrew Moore (DR), August 11, 1804 – December 4, 1804
▌William B. Giles (DR), from December 4, 1804

Senators' party membership by state at the opening of the 8th Congress in March 1803. 2 Democratic-Republicans 1 Democratic-Republican and 1 Federalist 2 Federalists

=== House of Representatives ===
The names of representatives are preceded by their district numbers.

==== Connecticut ====
All representatives were elected statewide on a general ticket.

▌At-large. Simeon Baldwin (F)
▌At-large. Samuel W. Dana (F)
▌At-large. John Davenport (F)
▌At-large. Calvin Goddard (F)
▌At-large. Roger Griswold (F)
▌At-large. John Cotton Smith (F)
▌At-large. Benjamin Tallmadge (F)

==== Delaware ====
▌At-large. Caesar A. Rodney (DR)

==== Georgia ====
All representatives were elected statewide on a general ticket.

▌At-large. Joseph Bryan (DR)
▌At-large. Peter Early (DR)
▌At-large. Samuel Hammond (DR), until February 2, 1805, Vacant thereafter
▌At-large. David Meriwether (DR)

==== Kentucky ====
▌1. Matthew Lyon (DR)
▌2. John Boyle (DR)
▌3. Matthew Walton (DR)
▌4. Thomas Sandford (DR)
▌5. John Fowler (DR)
▌6. George M. Bedinger (DR)

==== Maryland ====
The 5th district was a plural district with two representatives.

▌1. John Campbell (F)
▌2. Walter Bowie (DR)
▌3. Thomas Plater (F)
▌4. Daniel Hiester (DR), until March 7, 1804

▌Roger Nelson (DR), from November 6, 1804

▌5. William McCreery (DR)
▌5. Nicholas R. Moore (DR)
▌6. John Archer (DR)
▌7. Joseph H. Nicholson (DR)
▌8. John Dennis (F)

==== Massachusetts ====
▌1. William Eustis (DR)
▌2. Jacob Crowninshield (DR)
▌3. Manasseh Cutler (F)
▌4. Joseph Bradley Varnum (DR)
▌5. Thomas Dwight (F)
▌6. Samuel Taggart (F)
▌7. Nahum Mitchell (F)
▌8. Lemuel Williams (F)
▌9. Phanuel Bishop (DR)
▌10. Seth Hastings (F)
▌11. William Stedman (F)
▌12. Thomson J. Skinner (DR), until August 10, 1804

▌Simon Larned (DR), from November 5, 1804

▌13. Ebenezer Seaver (DR)
▌14. Richard Cutts (DR)
▌15. Peleg Wadsworth (F)
▌16. Samuel Thatcher (F)
▌17. Phineas Bruce (F)

==== New Hampshire ====
All representatives were elected statewide on a general ticket.

▌At-large. Silas Betton (F)
▌At-large. Clifton Clagett (F)
▌At-large. David Hough (F)
▌At-large. Samuel Hunt (F)
▌At-large. Samuel Tenney (F)

==== New Jersey ====
All representatives were elected statewide on a general ticket.

▌At-large. Adam Boyd (DR)
▌At-large. Ebenezer Elmer (DR)
▌At-large. William Helms (DR)
▌At-large. James Mott (DR)
▌At-large. James Sloan (DR)
▌At-large. Henry Southard (DR)

==== New York ====
▌1. John Smith (DR), until February 23, 1804

▌Samuel Riker (DR), from November 5, 1804

▌2. Joshua Sands (F)
▌3. Samuel L. Mitchill (DR), until November 22, 1804

▌George Clinton Jr. (DR), from February 14, 1805

▌4. Philip Van Cortlandt (DR)
▌5. Andrew McCord (DR)
▌6. Isaac Bloom (DR), until April 26, 1803

▌Daniel C. Verplanck (DR), from October 17, 1803

▌7. Josiah Hasbrouck (DR), from October 17, 1803
▌8. Henry W. Livingston (F)
▌9. Killian K. Van Rensselaer (F)
▌10. George Tibbits (F)
▌11. Beriah Palmer (DR)
▌12. David Thomas (DR)
▌13. Thomas Sammons (DR)
▌14. Erastus Root (DR)
▌15. Gaylord Griswold (F)
▌16. John Paterson (DR)
▌17. Oliver Phelps (DR)

==== North Carolina ====
▌1. Thomas Wynns (DR)
▌2. Willis Alston (DR)
▌3. William Kennedy (DR)
▌4. William Blackledge (DR)
▌5. James Gillespie (DR), until January 11, 1805; vacant thereafter
▌6. Nathaniel Macon (DR)
▌7. Samuel D. Purviance (F)
▌8. Richard Stanford (DR)
▌9. Marmaduke Williams (DR)
▌10. Nathaniel Alexander (DR)
▌11. James Holland (DR)
▌12. Joseph Winston (DR)

==== Ohio ====
▌At-large. Jeremiah Morrow (DR), from October 17, 1803

==== Pennsylvania ====
There were four plural districts, the 1st, 2nd, & 3rd had three representatives each, the 4th had two representatives.

▌1. Joseph Clay (DR)
▌1. Michael Leib (DR)
▌1. Jacob Richards (DR)
▌2. Robert Brown (DR)
▌2. Frederick Conrad (DR)
▌2. Isaac Van Horne (DR)
▌3. Isaac Anderson (DR)
▌3. Joseph Hiester (DR)
▌3. John Whitehill (DR)
▌4. David Bard (DR)
▌4. John A. Hanna (DR)
▌5. Andrew Gregg (DR)
▌6. John Stewart (DR)
▌7. John Rea (DR)
▌8. William Findley (DR)
▌9. John Smilie (DR)
▌10. William Hoge (DR), until October 15, 1804

▌John Hoge (DR), from November 2, 1804

▌11. John B. C. Lucas (DR)

==== Rhode Island ====
Both representatives were elected statewide on a general ticket.

▌At-large. Nehemiah Knight (DR)
▌At-large. Joseph Stanton Jr. (DR)

==== South Carolina ====
▌1. Thomas Lowndes (F)
▌2. William Butler Sr. (DR)
▌3. Benjamin Huger (F)
▌4. Wade Hampton (DR)
▌5. Richard Winn (DR)
▌6. Levi Casey (DR)
▌7. Thomas Moore (DR)
▌8. John B. Earle (DR)

==== Tennessee ====
All representatives were elected statewide on a general ticket.

▌At-large. George W. Campbell (DR)
▌At-large. William Dickson (DR)
▌At-large. John Rhea (DR)

==== Vermont ====
▌1. Gideon Olin (DR)
▌2. James Elliott (F)
▌3. William Chamberlain (F)
▌4. Martin Chittenden (F)

==== Virginia ====
▌1. John G. Jackson (DR)
▌2. James Stephenson (F)
▌3. John Smith (DR)
▌4. David Holmes (DR)
▌5. Thomas Lewis Jr. (F), until March 5, 1804

▌Andrew Moore (DR), March 5, 1804 – August 11, 1804
▌Alexander Wilson (DR), from December 4, 1804

▌6. Abram Trigg (DR)
▌7. Joseph Lewis Jr. (F)
▌8. Walter Jones (DR)
▌9. Philip R. Thompson (DR)
▌10. John Dawson (DR)
▌11. Anthony New (DR)
▌12. Thomas Griffin (F)
▌13. John J. Trigg (DR), until May 17, 1804

▌Christopher H. Clark (DR), from November 5, 1804

▌14. Matthew Clay (DR)
▌15. John Randolph (DR)
▌16. John W. Eppes (DR)
▌17. Thomas Claiborne (DR)
▌18. Peterson Goodwyn (DR)
▌19. Edwin Gray (DR)
▌20. Thomas Newton Jr. (DR)
▌21. Thomas M. Randolph (DR)
▌22. John Clopton (DR)

==== Non-voting members ====
Mississippi Territory. William Lattimore

== Changes in membership ==
The count below reflects changes from the beginning of the first session of this Congress.

=== Senate ===
Senate changes
State (class)	Vacated by	Reason for change	Successor	Date of successor's formal installation (Note: When seated or oath administered, not necessarily when service began.)
Ohio (1)	Vacant	Failure to elect	John Smith (DR)	Seated April 1, 1803
Ohio (3)	Vacant	Failure to elect	Thomas Worthington (DR)	Seated April 1, 1803
New Jersey (1)	Vacant	Failure to elect	John Condit (DR)	Seated September 1, 1803
Tennessee (1)	Vacant	Failure to elect	Joseph Anderson (DR)	Elected September 22, 1803
Virginia (1)	Stevens T. Mason (DR)	Died May 10, 1803	John Taylor (DR)	Appointed June 4, 1803
New York (3)	DeWitt Clinton (DR)	Resigned November 4, 1803, to become Mayor of New York City	John Armstrong Jr. (DR)	Appointed December 7, 1803
Virginia (1)	John Taylor (DR)	Successor elected December 7, 1803	Abraham B. Venable (DR)	Elected December 7, 1803
New York (1)	Theodorus Bailey (DR)	Resigned January 16, 1804, to become Postmaster of New York City	John Armstrong Jr. (DR)	Seated February 25, 1804
New York (3)	John Armstrong Jr. (DR)	Successor elected February 23, 1804	John Smith (DR)	Elected February 23, 1804
Virginia (2)	Wilson C. Nicholas (DR)	Resigned May 22, 1804, to become Collector of Port of Norfolk	Andrew Moore (DR)	Appointed August 11, 1804
Virginia (1)	Abraham B. Venable (DR)	Resigned June 7, 1804	William B. Giles (DR)	Appointed August 11, 1804
New York (1)	John Armstrong Jr. (DR)	Resigned June 30, 1804, after being appointed Minister to France	Samuel Latham Mitchill (DR)	Seated November 23, 1804
Rhode Island (1)	Samuel J. Potter (DR)	Died October 14, 1804	Benjamin Howland (DR)	Seated October 29, 1804
Delaware (2)	William H. Wells (F)	Resigned November 6, 1804	James A. Bayard (F)	Seated November 13, 1804
South Carolina (3)	Pierce Butler (DR)	Resigned November 21, 1804	John Gaillard (DR)	Seated December 6, 1804
Virginia (1)	William B. Giles (DR)	Successor elected December 4, 1804	Andrew Moore (DR)	Elected December 4, 1804
Virginia (2)	Andrew Moore (DR)	Successor elected December 4, 1804	William B. Giles (DR)	Elected December 4, 1804

=== House of Representatives ===
House changes
District	Vacated by	Reason for change	Successor	Date of successor's formal installation
New York; 7th	Vacant	John Cantine (DR) was elected, but resigned before the Congress began.	Josiah Hasbrouck (DR)	October 17, 1803
Connecticut at-large	Vacant	Incumbent Elias Perkins (F) elected but chose not to serve. Successor elected September 5, 1803.	Simeon Baldwin (F)	October 17, 1803
Ohio at-large	Vacant	Seat vacant following Ohio's admission to Union until special election held on June 21, 1803.	Jeremiah Morrow (DR)	October 17, 1803
New York; 6th	Isaac Bloom (DR)	Died April 26, 1803	Daniel C. Verplanck (DR)	October 17, 1803
New York; 1st	John Smith (DR)	Resigned February 23, 1804, after being elected to U.S. Senate	Samuel Riker (DR)	November 5, 1804
Virginia; 5th	Thomas Lewis Jr. (F)	Lost contested election March 5, 1804	Andrew Moore (DR)	March 5, 1804
Maryland; 4th	Daniel Hiester (DR)	Died March 7, 1804	Roger Nelson (DR)	November 6, 1804
Virginia; 13th	John J. Trigg (DR)	Died May 17, 1804	Christopher H. Clark (DR)	November 5, 1804
Massachusetts; 12th	Thomson J. Skinner (DR)	Resigned August 10, 1804	Simon Larned (DR)	November 5, 1804
Virginia; 5th	Andrew Moore (DR)	Resigned August 11, 1804, after being appointed to U.S. Senate	Alexander Wilson (DR)	December 4, 1804
Pennsylvania; 10th	William Hoge (DR)	Resigned October 15, 1804	John Hoge (DR)	November 2, 1804
New York; 3rd	Samuel L. Mitchill (DR)	Resigned November 22, 1804, after being elected to U.S. Senate	George Clinton Jr. (DR)	February 14, 1805
North Carolina; 5th	James Gillespie (DR)	Died January 11, 1805	Vacant	Not filled for remainder of term
Georgia at-large	Samuel Hammond (DR)	Resigned February 2, 1805, after becoming Civil and Military Governor of the Upper Louisiana Territory	Vacant	Not filled for remainder of term

== Committees ==
Lists of committees and their party leaders.

=== Senate ===
- Whole

=== House of Representatives ===
- Claims (Chairman: John C. Smith then Samuel W. Dana)
- Commerce and Manufactures (Chairman: Samuel L. Mitchill)
- Elections (Chairman: William Findley)
- Revisal and Unfinished Business (Chairman: Samuel Tenney)
- Rules (Select)
- Standards of Official Conduct
- Ways and Means (Chairman: John Randolph)
- Whole

=== Joint committees ===
- Enrolled Bills (Chairman: N/A)

== Officers ==
=== Legislative branch agency directors ===
- Architect of the Capitol: Benjamin H. Latrobe, appointed March 6, 1803
- Librarian of Congress: John J. Beckley

=== Senate ===
- Secretary: Samuel A. Otis
- Sergeant at Arms: James Mathers
- Chaplain: Edward Gantt, Episcopalian, until November 7, 1804
  - Alexander T. McCormick, Episcopalian, elected November 7, 1804

=== House of Representatives ===
- Clerk: John Beckley
- Sergeant at Arms: Joseph Wheaton
- Doorkeeper: Thomas Claxton
- Chaplain: William Parkinson, Baptist, until November 5, 1804
  - The Rev. James Laurie, Presbyterian, elected November 5, 1804

== See also ==
- 1802 United States elections (elections leading to this Congress)
  - 1802–03 United States Senate elections
  - 1802–03 United States House of Representatives elections
- 1804 United States elections (elections during this Congress, leading to the next Congress)
  - 1804 United States presidential election
  - 1804–05 United States Senate elections
  - 1804–05 United States House of Representatives elections
