= Samuel Purviance =

Samuel Purviance is the name of:

- Samuel Anderson Purviance (1809–1882), U.S. Representative from Pennsylvania
- Samuel D. Purviance (1774–1806), U.S. Representative from North Carolina
