= James West Clark =

American politician

James West Clark (October 15, 1779 – December 20, 1843) was a United States representative from North Carolina. Born in Bertie County to Hannah and Christopher Clark, a successful sea captain and import/export merchant. James Clark graduated from Princeton College in 1797, was a member of the State House of Commons in 1802, 1803 and 1811, and was a presidential elector on the Madison ticket in 1812. He was a member of the North Carolina Senate from 1812 to 1814 and was elected as a Republican to the Fourteenth Congress, serving from March 4, 1815, to March 3, 1817. Clark was appointed chief clerk of the Navy Department by Secretary John Branch and served from 1829 to 1831. He resigned his appointment in protest (as did John Branch) as a result of the Petticoat affair (or Peggy Eaton affair), which rocked Washington society and the Jackson administration.

In private life, Clark was a planter, businessman and slave owner. He owned several hundred acres of lands in North Carolina and at least 5,000 acres (20 km^{2}) in Dyer County, Tennessee. In 1835 he moved the bulk of his male slaves to Livingston, Alabama, where he made a substantial profit in the slave hire business. Clark's son, Henry Toole Clark, helped his father manage the family plantations and their local business interests, which included a grist mill and operating a canal. His son would later become governor of North Carolina during the Civil War from 1861 to 1862.

He died at home in Tarboro, North Carolina, at the age of 64.

U.S. House of Representatives
Preceded by William Kennedy	Member of the U.S. House of Representatives from North Carolina's 3rd congressional district 1815–1817	Succeeded by Thomas H. Hall
