= James Meriwether =

American politician (1789–1854)

James Meriwether (1789–1854) was a United States representative and lawyer from Georgia. His father was David Meriwether and his nephew was James Archibald Meriwether.

== Early years and education ==
Meriwether was born near Washington, Georgia, Wilkes County in 1789. He attended the common schools, and graduated from the University of Georgia in Athens with a Bachelor of Arts (A.B.) degree in 1807 and was a tutor at the University for a year.

== Career in law and military service ==
After studying law in Elberton, Georgia and gaining admittance to the state bar, he practiced law for a short time and then focused on farming. From 1811 to 1813, he was judge of the inferior court of Clarke County, Georgia. In 1813, Meriwether fought in the Creek War under the command of General John Floyd. Meriwether served as a trustee of UGA from 1816 until 1831.

== Political office ==
From 1821 to 1823, Meriwether served in the Georgia House of Representatives representing Clarke County. President James Monroe appointed Meriwether as a commissioner to negotiate with the Creek in 1823. In 1824, he was elected as a Jacksonian Representative to the 19th United States Congress and served one term from March 4, 1825 until March 3, 1827, as he did not seek reelection in 1826.

== Later years ==
James Meriwether returned to his farming and died while on a trip near Memphis, Tennessee, in 1854. He was buried at his family plantation in Clarke County.

U.S. House of Representatives
Preceded by Richard Henry Wilde	Member of the U.S. House of Representatives from Georgia's at-large congressional district March 4, 1825 – March 3, 1827	Succeeded by Wilson Lumpkin
