= James Sloan (politician) =

American politician (1748–1831)

Member of the U.S. House of Representatives from New Jersey's at-large district
- In office March 4, 1803 – March 3, 1809
- Preceded by: District created
- Succeeded by: Jacob Hufty

Personal details
- Born: October 10, 1748 Newton Township, Province of New Jersey, Kingdom of Great Britain
- Died: September 7, 1831 (aged 82) Southport, New York, U.S.
- Party: Democratic-Republican
- Profession: Politician

James Sloan (October 10, 1748 – September 7, 1831) was a U.S. representative from New Jersey.

Born in Newton Township in the Province of New Jersey, Sloan engaged in agricultural pursuits. He was assessor of Newton township for several years, and held several other local offices.

Sloan was elected as a Democratic-Republican to the Eighth, Ninth, and Tenth Congresses (March 4, 1803 – March 3, 1809). He was not a candidate for renomination.

Sloan fell seriously ill in 1811, which resulted in some newspapers reporting that he had died. However, Sloan ultimately did recover from his illness.

Sloan died in September 1831 in the town of Southport, New York.

U.S. House of Representatives
Preceded by District created	Member of the U.S. House of Representatives from New Jersey's at-large congressional district 1803–1809	Succeeded by Jacob Hufty
