= Alexander Wilson (Virginia politician) =

U.S. Representative from Virginia

Member of the U.S. House of Representatives from Virginia's 5th district
- In office December 4, 1804 – March 4, 1809
- Preceded by: Andrew Moore
- Succeeded by: James Breckinridge

Member of the Virginia House of Delegates from Botetourt County
- In office 1803; Alongside Martin McFerran

Personal details
- Born: Unknown
- Died: Unknown
- Party: Democratic-Republican

Alexander Wilson (birth and death dates unknown) was a U.S. representative from Virginia.

== Biography ==
Born in Virginia, Wilson completed preparatory studies. He served as member of the Virginia House of Delegates, 1803 and 1804.

Wilson was elected as a Democratic-Republican to the Eighth Congress to fill the vacancy caused by the resignation of United States Representative Andrew Moore. He was reelected to the Ninth and Tenth Congresses (December 4, 1804 – March 3, 1809).

== Electoral history ==
- 1804; Wilson was elected to the U.S. House of Representatives in a special election unopposed.
- 1805; Wilson was re-elected with 60.65% of the vote, defeating Federalist Robert Bailey
- 1807; Wilson was re-elected with 57.2% of the vote, defeating fellow Democrat-Republican Oliver Towles and Federalist Bailey.

== Sources ==
- United States Congress. "Alexander Wilson (id: W000568)". Biographical Directory of the United States Congress.

U.S. House of Representatives
Preceded by Andrew Moore	Member of the U.S. House of Representatives from Virginia's 5th congressional district 1804–1809	Succeeded by James Breckinridge
