= Thomas Sandford =

American politician

Thomas Sandford (1762 – December 10, 1808) was an American soldier and politician.

He was born in Westmoreland County, Virginia, in 1762, son of Youell Sanford (d. January 24, 1794 in Cople Parish, Westmoreland County) and Elizabeth Pope (b. 1732), daughter from a family long important in Virginia politics. In 1770, he inherited 150 acres of land from his paternal grandfather, Youell Sanford Sr.

He rose to become a General in the American War of Independence. Following the Revolution, he settled in Kentucky, where he had been granted land, in 1792. In his political career, he was a state representative and senator, then a representative in the Eighth and Ninth Congresses (1803–1807). He drowned in the Ohio River near Covington, Kentucky on December 10, 1808.

== Family ==
Thomas Sandford was born in 1762. He first married Sarah Redman (1768–1805) around 1786 in Westmoreland County, Virginia. They had two sons:

- Alfred Sandford was born on February 19, 1788, in Virginia. During the War of 1812 he was a Major appointed as Adjutant of the First Regiment (Lt. Col. Scott's) Kentucky Volunteers. Before 1843, Alfred built the palatial Sandford House beside Russell Street in Covington that is extant as of 2015. He died on February 2, 1863, at Jefferson City, Cole County, Missouri. By his wife, Susan Lewis Martin (1798–1832), he had at least six daughters and two sons.
- Alexander Pope Sandford (September 21, 1794 in Covington, Campbell County, Kentucky – October 13, 1847 in Covington) married Lucy Mary Berry (February 20, 1807 – 1856); they had three daughters then four sons.

Following the death of his first wife, Thomas Sanford married Margaret Bell (1771–1845). Their son Cassius Bell Sandford (June 17, 1808 in Covington - FEB 1871 in Covington) married Francis Susan Leathers (1815 - May 27, 1879). Their sons were Thomas C. Sandford (1836–1864) and John Leathers Sandford (1837–1895), the banker and former CSA colonel who was shot to death by a political rival, William Goebel.

U.S. House of Representatives
| Preceded by District created | Member of the U.S. House of Representatives from Kentucky's 4th congressional district 1803–1807 | Succeeded by Richard M. Johnson |
