= David Meriwether (Georgia politician) =

American politician (1755–1822)

Member of the U.S. House of Representatives from Georgia's at-large district
- In office December 6, 1802 – March 3, 1807
- Preceded by: Benjamin Taliaferro
- Succeeded by: George M. Troup

Speaker Georgia House of Representatives
- In office 1797–1800
- Preceded by: Thomas Stevens
- Succeeded by: Abraham Jackson

Presidential Elector - Georgia
- In office 1817–1821

Personal details
- Born: April 10, 1755 Charlottesville, Virginia Colony, British America
- Died: November 16, 1822 (aged 67) Athens, Georgia, U.S.
- Party: Jeffersonian Democratic-Republican
- Children: James Meriwether

Military service
- Allegiance: United States
- Branch/service: Continental Army; Georgia Militia 3rd Division
- Years of service: 1776–1779 Continental Army; 1797–1802 Georgia Militia
- Rank: Lieutenant; Brigadier General
- Commands: 3rd Georgia Division
- Battles/wars: Monmouth; Trenton; Brandywine; Siege of Savannah

David Meriwether (April 10, 1755 – November 16, 1822) was a United States representative from the state of Georgia. U.S. congressman James Meriwether was his son.

== Early years ==
David Meriwether was born at "Clover Fields" (home of the Meriwether family), near Charlottesville in the Virginia Colony, on April 10, 1755. During his early years in Virginia, Meriwether developed a personal friendship with Thomas Jefferson who was a plantation neighbor of the family. Some time later, Jefferson hired one of Meriwether's cousins, Meriwether Lewis as his personal secretary, before eventually commissioning the young Captain to undertake the exploration of the newly acquired Louisiana Purchase along with William Clark.

== Military service ==
David Meriwether joined the Continental Army in 1776 during the Revolutionary War. He fought in the Battle of Trenton (1776), Battle of Brandywine (1777), and the Battle of Monmouth (1778). Upon joining troops from his native state of Virginia, he was commissioned a lieutenant in New Jersey on May 15, 1779. Shortly thereafter, the Virginia troops marched south, to participate in the Siege of Savannah. During the march from Virginia to the outskirts of Savannah, Meriwether's column passed through Wilkes County. In his diary, he remarked that the countryside in that area of Georgia was particularly pleasing. In the subsequent Siege of Savannah, Meriwether was captured by the British and was paroled shortly thereafter. Following his parole, Meriwether returned to Wilkes County, where he married Frances Wingfield. They eventually had seven sons and one daughter. Meriwether continued to serve in the Army through the end of the war in 1783. In 1785, the couple settled in Wilkes County, where Meriwether had been granted land for his service in the Continental Army. During this period, his occupation was that of "planter". On September 21, 1797, Meriwether was commissioned a brigadier general in the Georgia militia by Governor Jared Irwin. In 1804, the family moved to Clarke County, near the city of Athens, where the General resided for the rest of his life.

== Political office ==
Meriwether was the Wilkes County Tax Collector in the year 1794, before being elected to the Georgia House of Representatives where he served as speaker from 1797 until 1800. He was then elected as a Jeffersonian to the 7th United States Congress to fill the vacancy caused by the resignation of Benjamin Taliaferro and was reelected to the 8th and 9th Congresses. His time in federal office spanned from December 6, 1802, to March 3, 1807. He did not run for reelection in 1806 to the 10th Congress and retired to his plantation near Athens, Georgia. After his congressional service, Meriwether was appointed a commissioner to the Creek Indians in 1804 and repeatedly reappointed to treat with other tribes. Meriwether served as a Presidential Elector from Georgia in the election cycles of 1816 and 1820, voting for James Monroe.

== Death and legacy ==
David Meriwether died near Athens, Georgia on November 16, 1822, and was buried in the private burial ground on his plantation.

He is the namesake of Meriwether County, Georgia.

== See also ==
- List of speakers of the Georgia House of Representatives
- Seventh United States Congress
- Eighth United States Congress
- Ninth United States Congress

U.S. House of Representatives
Preceded by Benjamin Taliaferro	Member of the U.S. House of Representatives from Georgia's at-large congressional district December 6, 1802 – March 3, 1807	Succeeded by George M. Troup
