= Thomas Plater =

American politician (1769–1830)

Thomas Plater (May 9, 1769 – May 1, 1830) was an American lawyer and politician from Maryland. He represented the third district of Maryland in the U.S. House from 1801 to 1805.

Thomas was born in Annapolis, Maryland, and brought up on his father's plantation of Sotterly in St. Mary's County, Maryland. He was the fourth of six children of George and Elizabeth (Rousby) Plater. His father, George Plater, served Maryland in the Continental Congress and governor. As the third son, Thomas wasn't likely to inherit the plantation. He did follow his father's example in that he went to the College of William and Mary in Virginia and read law.

Plater was admitted to the bar and practiced law. He made his home in Georgetown and held several local offices before being elected to the 7th Congress as a Federalist in 1800. He was re-elected to the 8th Congress and served until 1805.

After Plater's congressional service he resumed the private practice of law. He later moved to Poolesville in Montgomery County, Maryland, where he died in 1830.

U.S. House of Representatives
Preceded by William Craik	U.S. Congressman from Maryland's 3rd District; 1801–1805	Succeeded by Patrick Magruder
