= Beriah Palmer =

American politician (1740–1812)

Beriah Palmer (1740 in Bristol County, Massachusetts – May 20, 1812 in Ballston Spa, New York) was a United States representative from New York.

In 1769 he moved to Cornwall, Orange County. He studied law, was admitted to the bar and practiced in New York. He engaged in surveying and farming near Burnt Hills in Saratoga County, and in 1774 moved to Ballston Spa.

He served in the Twelfth Regiment of the New York militia during the Revolutionary War. He then served as assessor in 1779, commissioner of roads, district of Ballston, in 1780, 1783, and 1784, and served as postmaster in 1784. He was a member of the committee of safety of Albany County, and supervisor of Saratoga County in 1790, 1791, and 1799. He was moderator of the first board of supervisors of Saratoga County in 1791, and was appointed judge of the Court of Common Pleas in 1791. He was a member of the New York State Assembly from 1792 to 1795, and was a delegate to the New York constitutional convention in 1801.

Palmer was elected as a Democratic-Republican to the Eighth Congress, holding office from March 4, 1803 to March 3, 1805. He was surrogate of Saratoga County from 1808 to 1812 and in the latter year died in Ballston Spa and was interred in the Village Cemetery.

U.S. House of Representatives
New district	Member of the U.S. House of Representatives from New York's 11th congressional district 1803–1805	Succeeded by Peter Sailly
