= Marmaduke Williams =

American politician

Member of the Alabama House of Representatives
- In office 1821–1839

Member of the U.S. House of Representatives from North Carolina's 9th district
- In office March 4, 1803 – March 3, 1809
- Preceded by: Willis Alston
- Succeeded by: James Cochran

Member of the North Carolina Senate
- In office 1802

Personal details
- Born: April 6, 1774 Caswell County, North Carolina, British America
- Died: October 29, 1850 (aged 76) Tuscaloosa, Alabama, U.S.
- Party: Democratic-Republican
- Spouse: Agnes Payne (m. 1798)
- Children: 9

Marmaduke Williams (April 6, 1774 – October 29, 1850) was a Democratic-Republican U.S. Congressman from North Carolina from 1803 to 1809.

== Family ==
Williams was born in Caswell County, North Carolina. He was a brother of Mississippi Territorial Governor Robert Williams (1766–1836). He was first cousin of the brothers: Robert Williams (1773–1821), John Williams (Tennessee politician) (1778–1837) and Lewis Williams (1786–1842).

== Career ==
He studied law and was admitted to the North Carolina bar. He was elected to the North Carolina State Senate, serving 1802, and then was elected that same year to the 8th United States Congress. Williams was re-elected twice, serving in the 9th and 10th Congresses (March 4, 1803 – March 3, 1809). He declined to run for a fourth term and moved to the Mississippi Territory in 1810, then to Huntsville, Alabama, and by 1819, to Tuscaloosa, Alabama.

He was part of the people who pleaded in favor of the "zeal and patriotic spirit" of the people "west of the Allegany", at a time when US Easterners doubted the right-standing faith of Western settlers.

Williams was a delegate to the Alabama Constitutional Convention of 1819 and ran unsuccessfully that year for the post of Governor of Alabama against William Wyatt Bibb. He was the first Tuscaloosan to run for governor, and wanted to make Tuscaloosa the State's capital.

He served in the Alabama House of Representatives from 1821 to 1839, was the Secretary of the Board of Trustees of The University of Alabama from 1835 to 1841 and was a judge of the Tuscaloosa County court from 1832 to 1842.

== Private life ==
On October 26, 1798, in Caswell County, North Carolina, Williams married Agnes Payne (1775–1850), a first cousin of Dolley Madison. They raised 9 children. He was the grandfather of Lafayette Guild (1825–1870).

He died in Tuscaloosa in 1850 and is buried in Greenwood Cemetery.

Williams built (with slave labor) the Greek Revival three-story house (today the Foster-Murfee-Caples House) in Tuscaloosa’s Druid City Historic District. He then gave it to his daughter Agnes Payne Williams and her husband Hopson Owen. His Tuscaloosa home has been completely renovated.

U.S. House of Representatives
Preceded by Willis Alston	Member of the U.S. House of Representatives from North Carolina's 9th congressional district 1803–1809	Succeeded by James Cochran
