= Matthew Walton =

American politician

Member of the U.S. House of Representatives from Kentucky's 3rd district
- In office March 4, 1803 – March 3, 1807
- Preceded by: District created
- Succeeded by: John Rowan

Personal details
- Born: 1750
- Died: January 18, 1819 (aged 68–69) Springfield, Kentucky, U.S.
- Spouse: Frances Watkins (m. 1791)

Matthew Walton (1750 – January 18, 1819) was a U.S. representative from Kentucky, cousin of George Walton and John Walton.

Walton received a limited schooling. He served as member of the conventions held in Danville in 1785 and 1787. He served as member of the first State constitutional convention, 1792. He served as member of the Kentucky House of Representatives, 1792, 1795, and 1808.

Walton was elected as a Democratic-Republican to the Eighth and Ninth Congresses (March 4, 1803 – March 3, 1807). He died in Springfield, Kentucky on January 18, 1819.

U.S. House of Representatives
Preceded by District created	Member of the U.S. House of Representatives from Kentucky's 3rd congressional district 1803–1807	Succeeded by John Rowan
