= Samuel Hammond =

American politician (1757–1842)

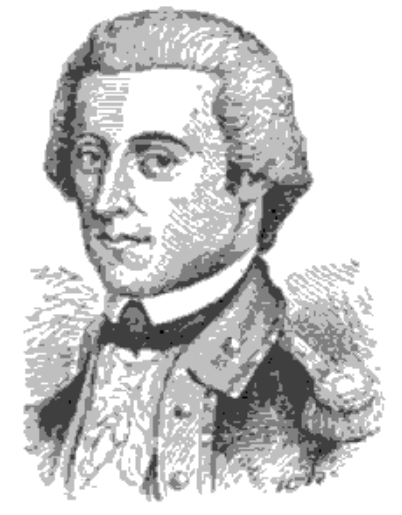

Member of the U.S. House of Representatives from Georgia's at-large district (seat D)
- In office March 4, 1803 – February 2, 1805
- Preceded by: Seat created
- Succeeded by: Cowles Mead

Personal details
- Born: September 21, 1757 Farnham Parish, Virginia Colony, British America
- Died: September 11, 1842 (aged 84) Beech Island, South Carolina, U.S.
- Resting place: Hammond Cemetery, North Augusta, South Carolina, U.S.
- Party: Republican

Samuel Hammond (September 21, 1757 – September 11, 1842) was a lieutenant colonel during the American Revolutionary War, governor and leader in the Louisiana and Missouri Territories, and United States Representative from Georgia in the 8th United States Congress.

== Early life ==
He was born in Farnham Parish in the Virginia Colony, to Elizabeth Hammond Steele and Charles Hammond; his parents were second cousins. Charles Hammond worked for the Virginia House of Delegates as a secretary. Like his son and three additional sons, Charles served during the Revolutionary War. Samuel attended the common schools. (Note: Stella Drumm, author of the biography on Samuel Hammond, contends that the Hammonds descended from Sir Anthony Hammond of County of Kent, England. He was of the St. Alban's Court and died in 1661.)

== Adult life ==
=== Virginia ===
Hammond served as a volunteer under Governor Dunmore against Native Americans and "distinguished himself" at the Battle of Kanawha, now more commonly known as the Battle of Point Pleasant. The battle took place on October 10, 1774.

In July 1776, Hammond fought against the Cherokee under Colonel Andrew Williamson.

During the American Revolutionary War, he served in the Continental Army. In December 1776, led a company of minutemen he raised in the Battle of Great Bridge in an area since named Great Bridge, Virginia. He served several years in Pennsylvania and New Jersey with his troops from Virginia.

=== Carolinas ===
In 1779 Charles Hammond moved to South Carolina. Samuel moved with his family and served the Revolutionary War in his new home state. He was promoted to Assistant Quartermaster at the siege of Savannah. He served as member of the "council of capitulation" at Charleston and was made lieutenant colonel. He commanded troops in battle at Augusta, Blackstock's Farm, Cowpens, Eutaw Springs, Guilford Courthouse, Hanging Rock, and Kings Mountain. Shortly after the war he settled in Savannah, Georgia.

=== Georgia ===
He served during the conflict with the Creek or Muscogee peoples in the latter 1780s and early 1790s, commanding a corps of Georgia Volunteers in 1793.

Hammond was Surveyor General of Georgia in 1796. He was a member of the Georgia House of Representatives 1796-1798 and a member of the Georgia Senate 1799 and 1800. He was elected as a Republican to the Eighth Congress and served from March 4, 1803, until February 2, 1805.

=== Louisiana and Missouri Territories ===
February 2, 1805 he became Colonel Commandant of the St. Louis District of the Louisiana Territory where he served from 1805 to 1824. He was made the first president (governor) of the Missouri Territorial Council in 1813. He was a receiver of public moneys in Missouri and president of the Bank of St. Louis.

=== South Carolina ===
Hammond moved to South Carolina in 1824 and became a member of the South Carolina House of Representatives. He then served as Surveyor General of South Carolina in 1825 and Secretary of State of South Carolina in 1831–1835.

== Marriage and children ==
Hammond married widow Rebecca Rae in 1783 and they settled in Savannah, Georgia. Rebecca's deceased husband was Colonel John Rae of Augusta, Georgia.

Rebecca died in 1798. Then, Hammond moved to Rae's Hall Plantation. He married a second time to Eliza Amelia O'Keefe on May 5, 1802. Their daughter, Mary Anne Magdalene Washington, founded the Daughters of the American Revolution in Georgia. In the early 20th century, a marble bust of her was erected in Continental Hall, Washington, D.C.

He had eight children.

== Freemason ==
Samuel Hammond was also a Freemason and member of Solomon's Lodge No. 1, F. & A. M. at Savannah, Georgia. This lodge was established by the renowned Freemason and founder of the Georgia colony, James Edward Oglethorpe, on February 21, 1734, and is now the "Oldest Continuously Operating English Constituted Lodge of Freemasons in the Western Hemisphere".

== Death ==
He retired from public life and died in 1842 at his home, "Varello Farm," at Beech Island, South Carolina, which is on the South Carolina side of the Savannah River, near Augusta, Georgia.

He is now buried near the Hammond Cemetery at the Charles Hammond House, North Augusta, South Carolina. A memorial commemorates the heroic actions of Colonel Samuel Hammond, Colonel LeRoy Hammond Jr., and Colonel LeRoy Hammond Sr.

== Bibliography ==
- United States Congress. "Samuel Hammond (id: H000133)". Biographical Directory of the United States Congress.

== Notes ==
U.S. House of Representatives
Preceded by seat created	Member of the U.S. House of Representatives from Georgia's at-large congressional district March 4, 1803 – February 2, 1805	Succeeded by Cowles Mead
