= William Kennedy (North Carolina politician) =

American politician

Member of the U.S. House of Representatives from North Carolina's 3rd district
- In office January 30, 1813 – March 3, 1815
- Preceded by: Thomas Blount
- Succeeded by: James West Clark
- In office March 4, 1809 – March 3, 1811
- Preceded by: Thomas Blount
- Succeeded by: Thomas Blount
- In office March 4, 1803 – March 3, 1805
- Preceded by: Robert Williams
- Succeeded by: Thomas Blount

Personal details
- Born: July 31, 1768 Washington, North Carolina, British America
- Died: October 11, 1834 (aged 66) Washington, North Carolina, U.S.
- Party: Democratic-Republican
- Education: University of Pennsylvania

William Kennedy (July 31, 1768 – October 11, 1834) was a member of the United States House of Representatives from North Carolina. He was born near Washington, North Carolina. He graduated from the University of Pennsylvania at Philadelphia in 1782.

Kennedy was elected as a Democratic-Republican to the Eighth United States Congress in 1802, serving from 1803 to 1805.

He was again elected to Congress in 1808, serving in the Eleventh United States Congress. Kennedy's re-election bid was defeated by Thomas Blount in 1810, though Kennedy was subsequently elected in a special election to fill the vacancy caused by Blount's death. He served the remainder of the term in the Twelfth United States Congress, and in 1812 won re-election for the Thirteenth United States Congress.

Kennedy died in Washington, North Carolina in 1834. He is interred in Kennedy Cemetery, near Washington, NC.

== Sources ==
- Biographical entry from the US Congress

U.S. House of Representatives
Preceded by Robert Williams	Member of the U.S. House of Representatives from North Carolina's 3rd congressional district March 4, 1803 – March 3, 1805	Succeeded by Thomas Blount
Preceded by Thomas Blount	Member of the U.S. House of Representatives from North Carolina's 3rd congressional district March 4, 1809 – March 3, 1811	Succeeded by Thomas Blount
Preceded by Thomas Blount	Member of the U.S. House of Representatives from North Carolina's 3rd congressional district January 30, 1813 – March 3, 1815	Succeeded by James W. Clark
