= James Mott (New Jersey politician) =

American politician

James Mott (January 18, 1739 – October 18, 1823) was a United States representative from New Jersey. Born near Middletown Township, Monmouth County, he was privately taught and became engaged in agricultural pursuits. He attained the rank of captain in the Second Regiment of Monmouth County Militia in 1775. Mott was a member of the New Jersey General Assembly from 1776 to 1779, and State Treasurer from 1783 to 1799. He was elected as a Democratic-Republican to the Seventh and Eighth Congresses, serving from March 4, 1801 to March 3, 1805. He died on his farm near Middletown in 1823, and was interred in Middletown Baptist Churchyard.

U.S. House of Representatives
Preceded by Thomas Sinnickson	Member of the U.S. House of Representatives from New Jersey's at-large congressional district 1801–1805	Succeeded by John Lambert
