= Samuel D. Purviance =

American politician

Samuel Dinsmore Purviance

Personal details
- Born: January 7, 1774 Wilmington, North Carolina
- Died: 1806 Red River
- Profession: lawyer

Samuel Dinsmore Purviance (January 7, 1774 – 1806) was a U.S. representative from North Carolina; born on Masonboro Sound at Castle Fin House, near Wilmington, North Carolina; attended a private school; studied law; was admitted to the bar and practiced at Fayetteville, North Carolina; also owned and operated a large plantation; In about 1792 he married Mary Brownlow (c.1774–January 23, 1802), daughter of John Brownlow and Rebecca Evans of Cumberland County, North Carolina. He was member of the State house of commons in 1798 and 1799; member of the North Carolina Senate from Cumberland County in 1801; trustee of Fayetteville Academy in 1803; elected as a Federalist to the Eighth Congress (March 4, 1803 – March 3, 1805); continued the practice of law in Fayetteville; died on the Red River in 1806, while on an exploring expedition into the West.

== See also ==
- Eighth United States Congress

U.S. House of Representatives
Preceded by William B. Grove	Member of the U.S. House of Representatives from North Carolina's 7th congressional district 1803–1805	Succeeded by Duncan McFarlan
