= Andrew Moore (politician) =

American politician (1752–1821)

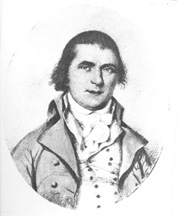

United States Senator from Virginia
- In office December 4, 1804 – March 3, 1809
- Preceded by: William Branch Giles
- Succeeded by: Richard Brent
- In office August 11, 1804 – December 4, 1804
- Appointed by: John Page
- Preceded by: Wilson Cary Nicholas
- Succeeded by: William Branch Giles

Member of the U.S. House of Representatives from Virginia's 5th district
- In office March 5, 1804 – August 11, 1804
- Preceded by: Thomas Lewis, Jr.
- Succeeded by: Alexander Wilson

Member of the U.S. House of Representatives from Virginia's 2nd district
- In office March 4, 1793 – March 3, 1797
- Preceded by: John Brown
- Succeeded by: David Holmes

Member of the U.S. House of Representatives from Virginia's 3rd district
- In office March 4, 1789 – March 3, 1793
- Preceded by: Position established
- Succeeded by: Joseph Neville

Personal details
- Born: 1752 near Fairfield, Virginia Colony, British America
- Died: April 14, 1821 (aged 68–69) Lexington, Virginia, U.S.
- Party: Democratic-Republican

Military service
- Branch/service: Continental Army; Virginia Militia
- Rank: Major General
- Battles/wars: American Revolutionary War; Battle of Saratoga

Andrew Moore (1752 – April 14, 1821) was an American lawyer and politician from Lexington, Virginia. Moore studied law under George Wythe and was admitted to the bar in 1774. He rose to the rank of captain in the Continental Army during the American Revolutionary War, seeing action at Saratoga. After the war he was eventually commissioned a major general in the Virginia militia in 1803. He was a delegate to the Virginia convention that ratified the United States Constitution in 1788. He was a member of the Virginia legislature from 1791 to 1789 and from 1799 to 1800. He represented Virginia in both the U.S. House (1789–1797, 1804) and the U.S. Senate (1804–1809). He died near Lexington, Virginia; on April 14, 1821.

== Electoral history ==
- 1789; Moore was elected to the U.S. House of Representatives with 84.16% of the vote, defeating Independent George Hancock.
- 1790; Moore was re-elected unopposed.
- 1793; Moore was re-elected unopposed.
- 1795; Moore was re-elected unopposed.

In 1803, Moore initially lost a very close race to Thomas Lewis and Lewis was seated. But Moore contested the result and in 1804, after Congress determined that several votes were cast - for both candidates - by someone who was unqualified, Moore was declared the winner.

U.S. House of Representatives
Preceded by Position established	Member of the U.S. House of Representatives from Virginia's 3rd congressional district 1789–1793	Succeeded by Joseph Neville
Preceded by John Brown	Member of the U.S. House of Representatives from Virginia's 2nd congressional district 1793–1797	Succeeded by David Holmes
Preceded by Thomas Lewis, Jr.	Member of the U.S. House of Representatives from Virginia's 5th congressional district 1804	Succeeded by Alexander Wilson
U.S. Senate
Preceded by Wilson C. Nicholas	U.S. senator (Class 2) from Virginia; 1804; Served alongside: William B. Giles	Succeeded by William B. Giles
Preceded by William B. Giles	U.S. senator (Class 1) from Virginia; 1804–1809; Served alongside: William B. Giles	Succeeded by Richard Brent
