= Willis Alston =

American politician (1769–1837)

Member of the U.S. House of Representatives from North Carolina
- In office March 4, 1825 – March 3, 1831
- Preceded by: George Outlaw
- Succeeded by: John Branch
- Constituency: 2nd district
- In office March 4, 1799 – March 3, 1815
- Preceded by: Thomas Blount
- Succeeded by: Joseph Hunter Bryan
- Constituency: 9th district (1799–1803); 2nd district (1803–1815)

Personal details
- Born: Willis Alston Jr. 1769 near Littleton, Province of North Carolina, British America
- Died: April 10, 1837 (aged 67–68) Halifax, North Carolina, U.S.
- Party: Jacksonian (since 1825)
- Other political affiliations: Federalist (until 1803); Democratic-Republican (1803–1825)
- Children: 1
- Relatives: Nathaniel Macon (uncle); James Boyd Hawkins (son-in-law)
- Occupation: Planter, politician

Willis Alston Jr. (1769 – April 10, 1837) was a politician and planter from North Carolina. A member of the Democratic-Republican Party and later a Jacksonian, he served as a U.S. representative in the 6th to the 13th Congresses (1799–1815) and the 19th to the 21st Congresses (1825–1831). He was the nephew of Nathaniel Macon.

== Early life ==
Willis Alston was born in 1769 near Littleton in the Province of North Carolina.

== Career ==
Alston engaged in agricultural pursuits at his slave plantation, Butterwood Plantation. He was elected to the North Carolina House of Commons in 1790 and served for two years; in 1794 he was elected to a single term in the North Carolina Senate.

=== Congress ===
In 1798, Alston was elected as a Federalist to the U.S. House, defeating incumbent Thomas Blount and two other candidates. Alston served from March 4, 1799, to March 4, 1815. Early in the Jefferson administration, Alston changed parties and became affiliated with the Republican Party. Local Federalists recruited former Gov. William R. Davie to challenge Alston in 1803, but Alston survived Davie's challenge. Alston chaired the House Committee on Revisal and Unfinished Business during the 13th U.S. Congress. In the election of April 1813, Alston defeated Daniel Mason, the Peace candidate, with the smallest margin of his re-election campaigns (56%-44%), and Alston retired at the end of the term.

=== Return to state legislature ===
He returned to the state House of Commons between 1820 and 1824, and then returned to Washington in 1825, elected as a Jacksonian Democrat. Serving three terms (March 4, 1825 – March 4, 1831), Alston chaired the Committee on Elections during the 21st Congress. He declined to seek re-election in 1830 and returned to agriculture.

== Relationship with John Randolph ==
Alston and John Randolph of Roanoke had an intense dislike for each other, and once had a pitched fight in a Washington boarding house, where heated words led to them throwing tableware at each other. Six years later, they fought again in a stairwell at the House after Alston loudly referred to Randolph as a "puppy". Randolph beat Alston bloody with his cane and the two had to be separated by other congressmen. Randolph was fined $20 for this breach of the peace.

== Death and legacy ==
Alston died on April 10, 1837, in Halifax, North Carolina, and is buried at his plantation home of Butterwood, near Littleton. His granddaughter, Missouri Alston Pleasants, established the Alston-Pleasants scholarship fund in his memory.

In his will, he divided up ownership of his approximately 90 slaves among his family members.

== Notes ==
U.S. House of Representatives
Preceded by Thomas Blount	Member of the U.S. House of Representatives from North Carolina's 9th congressional district 1799–1803	Succeeded by Marmaduke Williams
Preceded by Matthew Locke	Member of the U.S. House of Representatives from North Carolina's 2nd congressional district 1803–1815	Succeeded by Joseph H. Bryan
Preceded by George Outlaw	Member of the U.S. House of Representatives from North Carolina's 2nd congressional district 1825-1831	Succeeded by John Branch
