= Philip R. Thompson =

American politician (1766–1837)

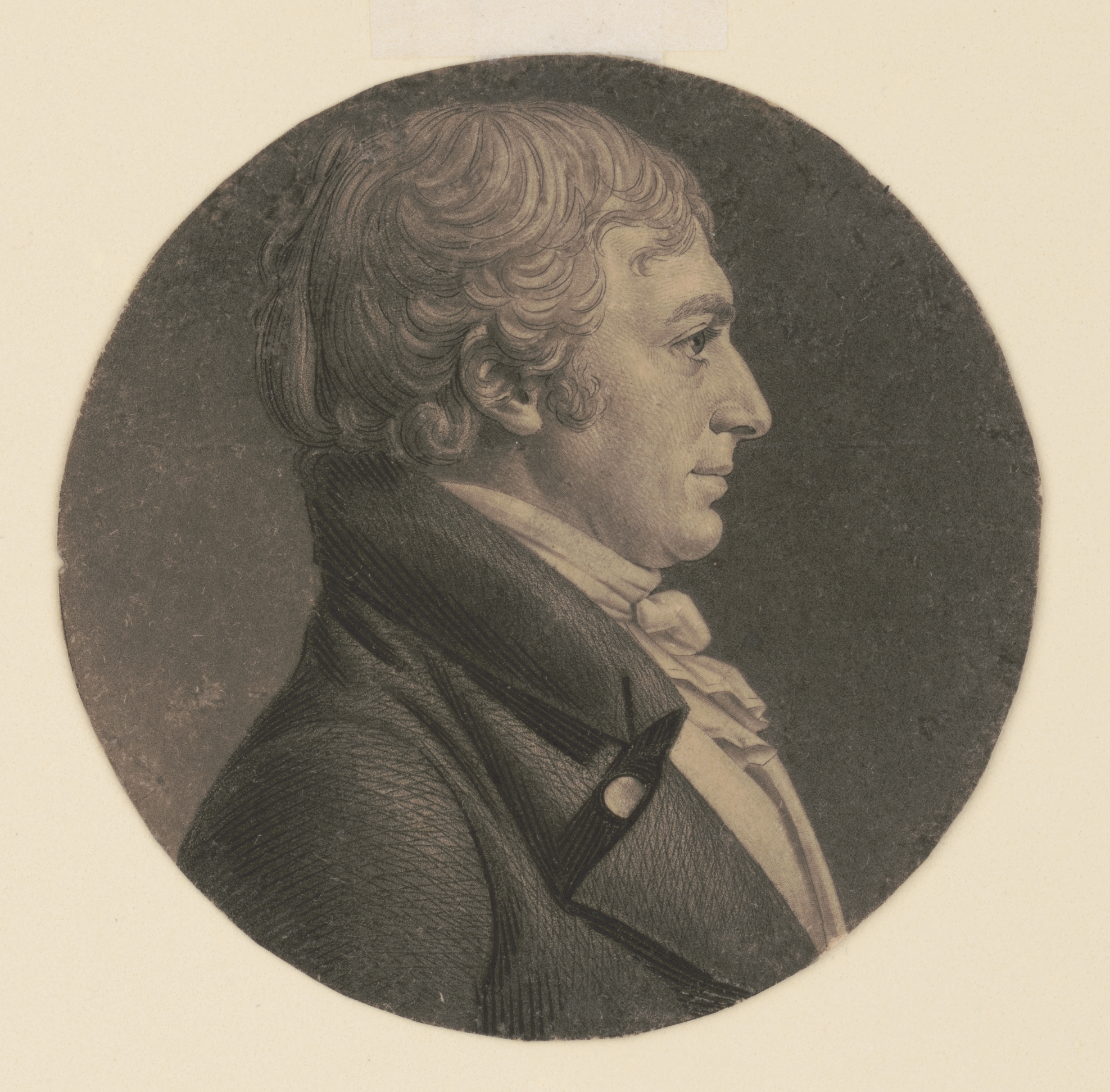
- Philip Rootes Thompson, head-and-shoulders portrait

Member of the U.S. House of Representatives from Virginia's 18th district
- In office March 4, 1801 – March 3, 1807
- Preceded by: John Nicholas
- Succeeded by: Peterson Goodwyn

Member of the Virginia House of Delegates from Culpeper County
- In office 1793–1796

Personal details
- Born: March 26, 1766 Fredericksburg, Virginia Colony, British America
- Died: July 27, 1837 (aged 71) Kanawha County, Virginia, U.S.
- Party: Democratic-Republican Party
- Education: College of William & Mary
- Occupation: attorney, farmer, judge

Philip Rootes Thompson (March 26, 1766 – July 27, 1837) was an 18th-century and 19th-century politician and lawyer from Virginia.

Born near Fredericksburg in the Colony of Virginia, Thompson was educated by private teachers as a child. He graduated from the College of William and Mary, studied law and was admitted to the bar, commencing practice in Fairfax, Virginia. He was a member of the Virginia House of Delegates from 1793 to 1797 and was elected a Democratic-Republican to the United States House of Representatives in 1800, serving from 1801 to 1807. Afterwards, Thompson continued to practice law until his death on July 27, 1837, in Kanawha County, Virginia (now West Virginia) and was interred in Coals Mouth, Virginia (now St. Albans, West Virginia).

U.S. House of Representatives
Preceded by John Nicholas	Member of the U.S. House of Representatives from Virginia's 18th congressional district March 4, 1801 – March 3, 1803 (obsolete district)	Succeeded by Peterson Goodwyn
Preceded by William B. Giles	Member of the U.S. House of Representatives from Virginia's 9th congressional district March 4, 1803 – March 3, 1807	Succeeded by John Love
