= William McCreery (Maryland politician) =

American politician

William McCreery (1750 – March 8, 1814) was a U.S. representative from Maryland.

Born in the Province of Ulster in the Kingdom of Ireland, McCreery received a limited education and immigrated to the Thirteen Colonies in his youth, where he located in Maryland. He engaged in agricultural pursuits, and was elected as a Democratic-Republican to the Eighth and to the two succeeding Congresses (March 4, 1803 – March 3, 1809). In Congress, McCreery served as chair of the Committee on Commerce. After his tenure in Congress, he resumed agricultural pursuits, and also served as a member of the Maryland Senate from September 1811 until his death at his country home, "Clover Hill", near Reisterstown, Baltimore County, Maryland.

U.S. House of Representatives
Preceded by Samuel Smith	Member of the U.S. House of Representatives from Maryland's 5th congressional district 1803–1809	Succeeded by Alexander McKim
