= Thomas Lewis Jr. =

American politician

Member of the U.S. House of Representatives from Virginia's 5th district
- In office March 4, 1803 – March 5, 1804
- Preceded by: John J. Trigg
- Succeeded by: Andrew Moore

Member of the Virginia House of Delegates from Kanawha County
- In office December 3, 1798 – December 1, 1800 Serving with William Morris, David Ruffner
- Preceded by: Edward Graham
- Succeeded by: William Clendinen
- In office November 10, 1795 – November 8, 1796 Serving with George Clendinen
- Preceded by: William Morris
- Succeeded by: William Morris, Jr.

Personal details
- Born: January 26, 1760 Augusta County, Virginia Colony, British America
- Died: 1847 (aged 86–87)
- Party: Federalist

Thomas Lewis Jr. (January 26, 1760 – 1847) was an American politician from Rockingham County, Virginia. He represented Virginia in the U.S. House in 1803 and 1804, after several terms in the Virginia House of Delegates representing Kanawha County.

== Early and family life ==
Thomas Jr. was the son of Jane Strother, whose family held various political offices in Virginia, and her lawyer husband Thomas, whose father John Lewis had emigrated from Ireland. Born on his father's plantation of Lynwood in what was then vast Augusta County in the Colony of Virginia, but which became Rockingham County during the American Revolutionary War.

Kanawha County voters elected him to terms in Virginia's House of Delegates. Although he served nearly a year in Congress, his election had been contested by Andrew Moore. After some consideration in a committee, the House voted on March 5, 1804 to declare his election invalid and awarded his seat to Moore.

== Electoral history ==
1803 - Lewis was elected to the U.S. House of Representatives with 47.03% of the vote, defeating fellow Federalist John Woodward and Democrat-Republican Andrew Moore; Moore successfully contested the result though, and was seated.

U.S. House of Representatives
Preceded by John J. Trigg	Member of the U.S. House of Representatives from Virginia's 5th congressional district 1803–1804	Succeeded by Andrew Moore
