= Gaylord Griswold =

American politician (1767–1809)

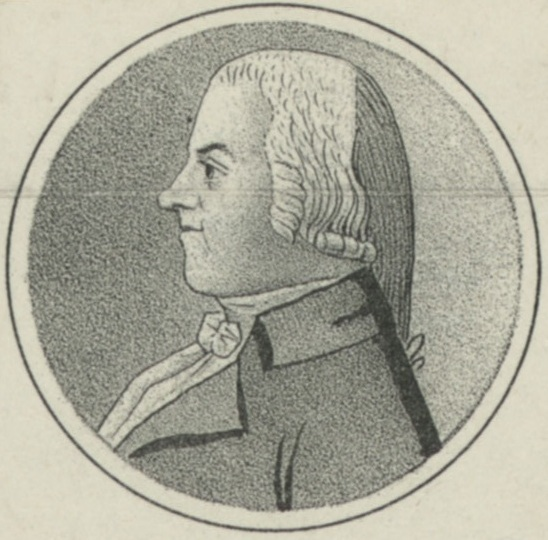
Gaylord Griswold, New York Congressman

Gaylord Griswold (December 18, 1767 – March 1, 1809) was a United States representative from New York. Born in Windsor, Connecticut, he pursued classical studies and graduated from Yale College in 1787. He studied law and was admitted to the bar in 1790, commencing practice in Windsor. He moved to Herkimer, New York in 1792 with his friend Thomas R. Gold, with whom he practiced law. Griswold was a member of the New York State Assembly from 1796 to 1798.

Griswold was elected as a Federalist to the Eighth Congress, holding office from March 4, 1803 to March 3, 1805. During his term Griswold played a leading role in drafting and passing the Twelfth Amendment to the United States Constitution.

During the 1804 election for Governor of New York between Morgan Lewis and Aaron Burr, both Democratic-Republicans, Burr actively courted the support of Federalists. Griswold authored a private letter advocating that Federalists support Burr, arguing that it was the best way to keep the Federalist Party viable for future elections. Griswold's letter was eventually made public, and appeared in an 1807 handbill accusing the Federalists of unseemly political intriguing, to the party's detriment.

He resumed the practice of law in Herkimer, and died there March 1, 1809; interment was in Oak Hill Cemetery.

U.S. House of Representatives
New district	Member of the U.S. House of Representatives from New York's 15th congressional district 1803–1805	Succeeded by Nathan Williams
