= John Fowler (politician) =

American politician

Member of the U.S. House of Representatives from Kentucky's 5th district
- In office March 4, 1803 – March 3, 1807
- Preceded by: Constituency established
- Succeeded by: Benjamin Howard

Member of the U.S. House of Representatives from Kentucky's 2nd district
- In office March 4, 1797 – March 3, 1803
- Preceded by: Alexander D. Orr
- Succeeded by: John Boyle

Member of the Virginia House of Delegates from the Woodford County district
- In office October 17, 1791 – December 20, 1791 Serving with John Grant
- Preceded by: John Craig
- Succeeded by: position abolished

Member of the Virginia House of Delegates from the Fayette County district
- In office October 16, 1786 – June 22, 1788 Serving with Joseph Crockett, Thomas Marshall,
- Preceded by: Christopher Greenup
- Succeeded by: James Trotter

Personal details
- Born: April 27, 1756 Chesterfield County, Colony of Virginia, British America
- Died: August 22, 1840 (aged 84) Lexington, Kentucky, U.S.
- Resting place: Old Episcopal Cemetery

John Fowler (April 27, 1756 – August 22, 1840) was an American planter and political leader in Virginia and Kentucky. After serving in the American Revolutionary War, Fowler became an early settler and civic leader in Lexington, Kentucky. A Jeffersonian Democrat, he variously represented Fayette County and nearby Woodford County in the Virginia House of Delegates and the Virginia Ratifying Convention before Kentucky's statehood, then became a Democratic-Republican member of the United States House of Representatives and served from 1797 to 1807.

== Early life and education ==
Fowler was born in Chesterfield County, Virginia, on April 27, 1756, to John and Judith (Hudson) Fowler. He received an education appropriate to his class, including at the private common schools.

=== American Revolutionary War ===
Fowler fought in the American Revolutionary War, joining Captain Patterson's company in 1777 as a first lieutenant and rising to the rank of captain in 1783. Meanwhile, Fowler also studied at the College of William & Mary in Williamsburg 1780, and became a member of the Williamsburg Lodge Freemasons.

== Kentucky career ==
In 1783, Fowler moved to Lexington, Kentucky, with surrounding Fayette County then considered a part of Virginia. Fayette County voters elected Fowler as one of the two delegates representing them in the Virginia House of Delegates, and re-elected him the following year (but replaced his fellow part-time legislator). While Fowler attended the legislative session in Richmond in October 1786, fellow legislators appointed him as one of the trustees of the new city of Frankfort, Kentucky.

In June 1787, Fowler joined Captain James Brown's company of Kentucky volunteers, which fought Indians, and continued to serve intermittently until 1794. Fowler held the rank of ensign in the Lexington Light Infantry. In 1787, Fowler was part of the Danville convention of 1787 (Kentucky's third statehood convention), also representing Fayette County.

In June 1788, Fowler and Humphrey Marshall were Fayette County's delegates to the Virginia Ratifying Convention, which ratified the United States Constitution. However, neither represented Fayette County in the legislative session that began on June 23. Fowler again won election to the Virginia legislature representing Woodford County on the outskirts of Lexington in 1791, and thus served in the session which approved Kentucky's statehood (and terminated this man's Virginia legislative service).

Also in 1788, Fowler, along with Richard Clough Anderson Sr. and Green Clay, established Lexington Freemason Lodge No. 1. Fowler also was a member of Kentucky Society for Promoting Useful Knowledge, which was associated with the Danville Political Club. Fowler was also the treasurer of Transylvania Seminary from 1789 to 1793.

Fowler served as a "gentleman justice" of the peace for Woodford County, Kentucky from May 5, 1789, to 1794. From 1792 to 1794, Fowler served as clerk of the court of oyer and terminer, as well as clerk to the directors of public buildings. In the 1794 elections, Fowler ran for U.S. Senate from Kentucky, but Kentucky legislators eliminated him on the first ballot: Humphrey Marshall received eighteen votes, John Breckinridge sixteen, Fowler eight, and incumbent John Edwards seven.

Kentucky voters first elected Fowler to the United States House of Representatives in 1797, after Alexander D. Orr of Maysville (who represented what was then Kentucky's northern district) announced his retirement. Fowler defeated fellow former Virginian Notley Conn and won re-election four times (although the district numbers changed after the census-based reorganization in 1803) and thus served a decade, in the Fifth, Sixth, Seventh, Eighth, and Ninth congresses.

After leaving that legislative office in 1807, Fowler served as a member of the board of trustees for Lexington, and chairman of the board from 1817 to 1818. Fowler also served as Lexington's fourth postmaster, from 1814 to 1822.

Fowler had large land holdings in Virginia and Kentucky, which he operated at least in part using enslaved labor. He was one of the founders of the Kentucky Agricultural Society. Sometime before 1800, Fowler established "Fowler's Gardens" on three hundred acres near Lexington. This large tract of land on the eastern edge of Lexington opened as a park in 1817, and the area was used for fairs, picnics, barbeques, political gatherings, and other events.

In 1802, Fowler donated ninety-three acres of land near Carlisle, Kentucky, to the Concord Presbyterian Church.

== Personal life ==
Fowler married Millicent Wills of Virginia sometime before 1789, and they had five children. Millicent Wills Fowler predeceased him in July 1833. Fowler died in Lexington on August 22, 1840. He is buried in the Old Episcopal Cemetery in Lexington. In the 1810 federal census, he and his wife owned 7 slaves in Lexington. A decade late, he owned 27 slaves, of which 5 boys and 7 girls were younger than 14 years old. However, in the 1830 census, Fowler owned a dozen slaves (of whome 4 boys and 1 girl were younger than 10 years old) and had two free blacks in his household.
