= Annie Chambers Ketchum =

American educator, lecturer, and writer

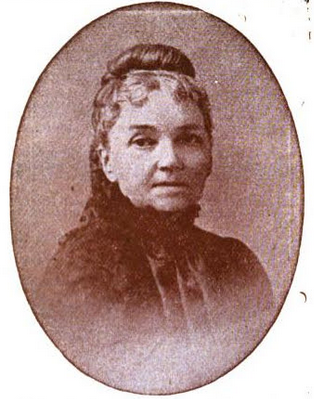
- Annie Chambers Bradford Ketchum; Sister Amabilis
- Born: Annelizah Chambers; November 8, 1824 near Georgetown, Kentucky, U.S.
- Died: January 27, 1904 (aged 79); New York City, U.S.
- Occupations: educator, lecturer, writer, Capitular Tertiary of St. Dominic
- Spouse(s): William Bradford (m. 1844); Leonidas Ketchum (m. 1858)
- Children: 2 children
- Writing career
- Language: English
- Subjects: botany, botanical illustration, education, literature, elocution, poetry
- Notable works: Botany for Academies and Colleges: Consisting of Plant Development and Structure from Seaweed to Clematis

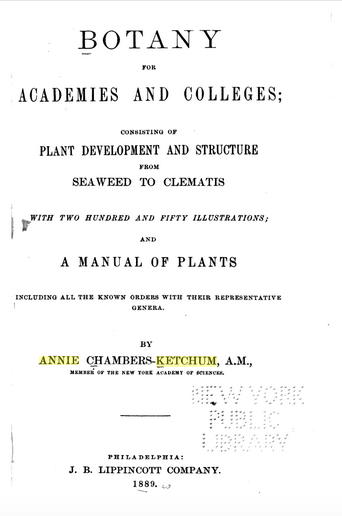
Botany for Academies and Colleges (1889)

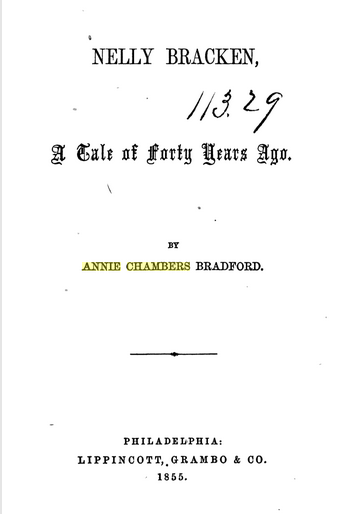
Nelly Bracken: A Tale of Forty Years Ago (1855)

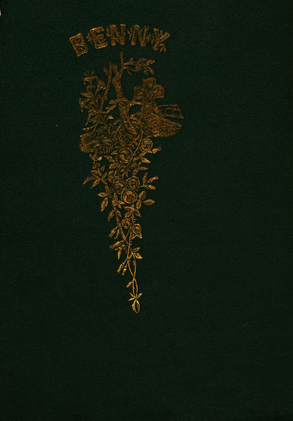
Benny: a Christmas Ballad (1870)

Annie Chambers Ketchum (religious name, Sister Amabilis; November 8, 1824 – January 27, 1904) was an American educator, lecturer, and writer. She was a member of the New York Academy of Sciences and became a Capitular Tertiary of St. Dominic in her later years. Chambers served as principal of the High School for Girls in Memphis, Tennessee, where she established a girls school. She opened a normal school for advanced pupils in Georgetown, Kentucky.

Ketchum did not write for publication previous to the civil war, but her first productions brought instant recognition of her merit and ability. Two volumes of verse and two novels were published by her. Ketchum was the founding editor of The Lotus, a monthly magazine, and she published the textbook, Botany for academies and colleges: consisting of plant development and structure from seaweed to clematis. Noted for her poetic talent, her "Semper Fidelis," published in Harper's Magazine, was said to be one of the most finished productions of American literature in its day.

== Early life and education ==
Annelizah (nickname, "Annie") Chambers was born near Georgetown, Kentucky, November 8, 1824, in Scott County, Kentucky. Her siblings included Fielding Thomas, Fenora Thomas, Beline, Renette, and Le Wilma. She was the youngest living daughter of Violetta Bradford and Major Benjamin Stuart Chambers, a lawyer. Major Chambers was one of the twenty who made the "forlorn hope" at the Battle of the River Thames in 1813, and one of the six who came out alive from that massacre. Violetta was the eldest daughter of Judge Fielding Bradford of Kentucky who with his brother, John, founded the Kentucky Gazette, at Lexington, Kentucky, in August, 1787, the first newspaper west of the Allegheny Mountains.

In early childhood, while growing up at Acacia Grove (now called Cardome), Ketchum was often found reading books which children usually considered dull. She benefited from the best educational advantages. In the classics, she was equally adept with belles-lettres, natural sciences, and mathematics. In modern languages, music and drawing, she excelled. She had good knowledge of Greek, Latin and French, and a fair knowledge of Italian and German. She was tutored at home until she attended Georgetown Female College where she graduated with the M.A. degree.

== Early career ==
Subsequent to her father's death, she married her cousin, William Bradford, on December 22, 1844, after her father's death, she married her cousin, William Bradford. (Note: According to another source, his name may have been Joseph Woods Bradford.) Within a few years, she was left alone, raising two children. (Note: According to one account, the husband died and she was left a widow, while another source states that she separated from her husband and was divorced.)

She was appointed principal in 1855 of the High School for Girls in Memphis, Tennessee, where she partnered with the Young Men's High School to establish a co-educational class in elocution. She met Charlotte Cushman, a famous actress who gave her lessons in public speaking. During school vacations, she gave a series of popular lectures which then paid for the girls school's equipment for chemistry, physics and astronomy.

In 1858, she married Leonidas Ketchum of Memphis. From 1859 to 1861, she served as the founding editor of The Lotus, a monthly magazine. It published a few numbers at Memphis, when the magazine was suspended on account of the American Civil War in 1861. It published some of the earliest verses of the Massachusetts writer, Nora Perry, who subsequently won a national reputation.

== Civil War years ==
When the American Civil War began, her husband enlisted in the Army of the C.S.A. and became an Adjutant of the 38th Tennessee Infantry, which led the confederate army at the Battle of Shiloh. There, he was wounded and died in 1863. When Memphis fell to the Federal army, a British Legation visited the city and Sir Henry Percy Anderson met Ketchum, her poetry having become very popular in England. The British delegate asked her to improve up on the latest popular Civil War song, "The Bonnie Blue Flag," and she published the new verses under the title The Gathering Song. The Federal authorities then arrested Ketchum and required her to take the Ironclad Oath of allegiance to the Union. Upon her refusal, she and her children were banished from Memphis. She returned north to her native town, Georgetown, Kentucky, and there opened a normal school for advanced pupils.

== Post-war ==
After the Civil War, she returned to Memphis in 1866 to find her home destroyed. She established a girls school in which she was assisted by her daughter. In the summer of 1867, her son, who was on vacation from Sewanee where he was studying for the ministry, died of cholera.

Upon his death, she left Memphis for Europe, residing for several years in England and France. She documented her journeys while living abroad in a series of articles called "Gypsying" which she sold to U.S. magazines to pay her way. Eventually, she converted and became a Roman Catholic. While in Paris, she became a novitiate in a Dominican convent on May 24, 1876. Because she did not live in a cloister, she became a Capitular Tertiary of St. Dominic. She wore traditional women's clothes but donned a Dominican habit on the Catholic Church's holy feast days and she was buried in it. Her religious name was Sister Amabilis, which she used while she continued her intellectual life as a botanist. (Note: See, for example, the reference to correspondence with Sister Amabilis in the biography of Tennessee botanist, Dr. Augustin Gattinger.)

Upon her return to the U.S., she resided in New York City, writing for journals and building up over 100 lectures on literature, science and art. It was during this time that she published her novel with Lippincott, and her textbook, Botany for academies and colleges: consisting of plant development and structure from seaweed to clematis, which included illustrations she had made during her visits to European gardens. In Will Hale's 1903 summary of Southern periodicals, he expressed his great respect for her as a scientist and writer.

Ketchum's writings were numerous and included Nellie Bracken: a tale of forty years ago, (a novel published in 1855 by Lippincott); Gypsying (letters of travel); Christmas Carillons: and other poems, (a volume of poems published by Appleton in 1888), as well as a large number of lectures on science, literature and art. She composed an entirely original work on botany, Botany for academies and colleges: consisting of plant development and structure from seaweed to clematis, as a textbook for academies and colleges, containing in its three hundred duodecimo pages twice as much instruction as could be found in other textbooks in use.

Ketchum died at St. Vincent's Hospital, New York, January 27, 1904.

== Selected works ==
- Hines. A story of New Orleans.
- Nelly Bracken, a tale of forty years ago., 1855
- Benny : a christmas ballad., 1870
- Lotos-flowers, gathered in sun and shadow, 1877
- Christmas carillons, and other poems., 1888
- Botany for academies and colleges: consisting of plant development and structure from seaweed to clematis, 1889
