= John Breckinridge (U.S. Attorney General) =

American politician (1760–1806)

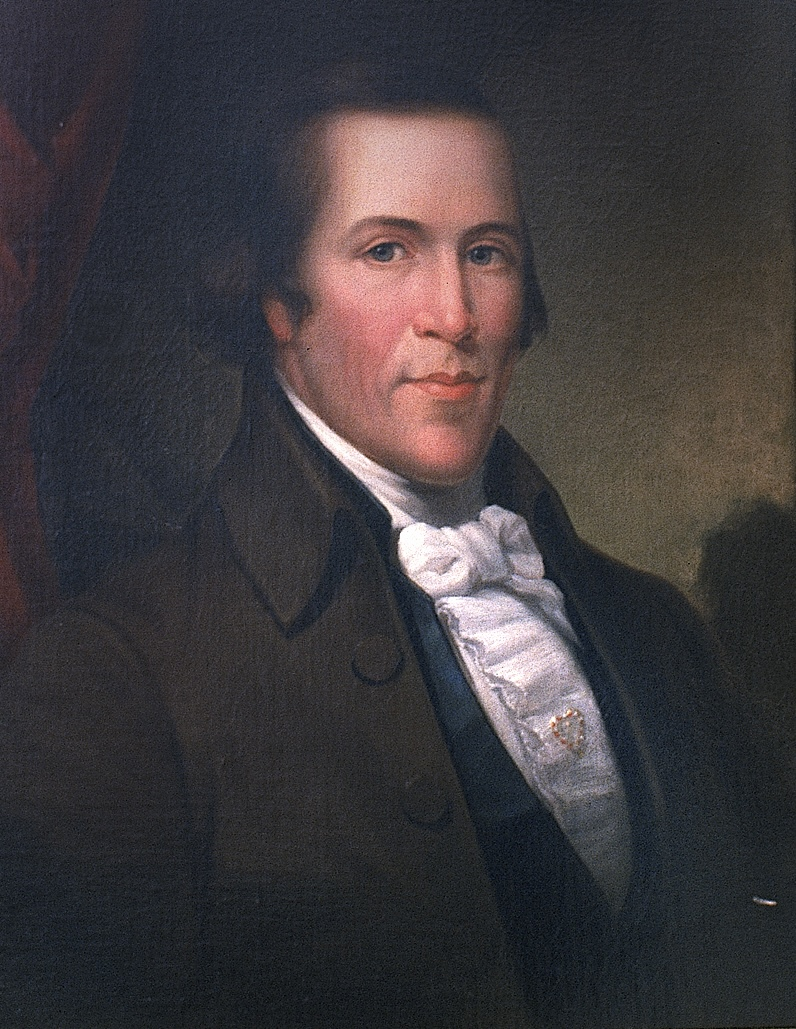
- Posthumous portrait by Alban Jasper Conant, c. 1863

5th United States Attorney General
- In office August 7, 1805 – December 14, 1806
- President: Thomas Jefferson
- Preceded by: Levi Lincoln Sr.
- Succeeded by: Caesar A. Rodney

United States Senator from Kentucky
- In office March 4, 1801 – August 7, 1805
- Preceded by: Humphrey Marshall
- Succeeded by: John Adair

3rd Speaker of the Kentucky House of Representatives
- In office 1799–1800
- Preceded by: Edmund Bullock
- Succeeded by: John Adair

Member of the Kentucky House of Representatives for Fayette County
- In office 1798–1800

Attorney General of Kentucky
- In office December 19, 1793 – November 30, 1797
- Governor: Isaac Shelby; James Garrard
- Preceded by: George Nicholas
- Succeeded by: James Blair

Member of the Virginia House of Delegates representing Montgomery County
- In office 1784–1785 Serving with Robert Sayers
- Preceded by: John Preston
- Succeeded by: Daniel Trigg

Member of the Virginia House of Delegates representing Botetourt County
- In office 1783–1784 Serving with Archibald Stuart
- Preceded by: Thomas Madison
- Succeeded by: George Hancock
- In office 1781 Serving with Samuel Lewis
- Preceded by: Thomas Madison
- Succeeded by: Thomas Madison

Personal details
- Born: December 2, 1760 Augusta County, Virginia, British America
- Died: December 14, 1806 (aged 46) Fayette County, Kentucky, U.S.
- Resting place: Lexington Cemetery
- Party: Democratic-Republican
- Spouse: Mary Hopkins Cabell (m. 1785)
- Children: 9, including Cabell and Robert
- Relatives: Breckinridge family
- Education: Washington and Lee University; College of William & Mary

Military service
- Allegiance: United States
- Branch/service: Virginia militia
- Battles/wars: American Revolutionary War

John Breckinridge (December 2, 1760 – December 14, 1806) was an American politician, militia officer, planter, and lawyer. He served several terms in the state legislatures of Virginia and Kentucky before being elected to the United States Senate. Breckinridge also served as the United States Attorney General during the second term of President Thomas Jefferson. He was the progenitor of Kentucky's Breckinridge family and the namesake of Breckinridge County, Kentucky.

Breckinridge's father was a landowner and colonel in the Virginia militia who married into the Preston family. Breckinridge attended the College of William & Mary intermittently between 1780 and 1784. His attendance there was interrupted by the American Revolutionary War, and also he was elected thrice to the Virginia House of Delegates, becoming one of the youngest members of the house; this allowed him to meet many prominent politicians. In 1785, Breckinridge married "Polly" Cabell, a member of the Cabell family. Despite his successful political career, letters from relatives in Kentucky convinced him to move to the western frontier. He established a slave plantation named "Cabell's Dale" near Lexington, Kentucky, in 1793.

Breckinridge continued his legal and political career and was appointed as the Attorney General of Kentucky soon after arriving. In November 1797, he resigned his office and was subsequently elected to the Kentucky House of Representatives. As a legislator, Breckinridge secured the passage of a more humane criminal code which abolished capital punishment for all offenses except first-degree murder. On a 1798 trip back to Virginia, an intermediary gave him Jefferson's Kentucky Resolutions, which denounced the Alien and Sedition Acts. At Jefferson's request, Breckinridge assumed credit for the modified resolutions he shepherded through the Kentucky General Assembly; Jefferson's authorship was not discovered until after Breckinridge's death. Although Breckinridge opposed calling a constitutional convention for the new state in 1799, he was elected as a Kentucky delegate. Due to his influence, the state's government remained comparatively aristocratic, maintaining protections for slaveowners and limiting the power of the electorate. Called the father of the resultant constitution, he emerged from the convention as the acknowledged leader of the state's Democratic-Republican Party and fellow delegates elected him as speaker of the Kentucky House of Representatives in 1799 and 1800.

Elected to the Senate in 1800, Breckinridge functioned as Jefferson's floor leader, guiding administration bills through the chamber that was narrowly controlled by his party. Residents of the western frontier called for his nomination as vice president in 1804, but Jefferson appointed him as Attorney General in 1805 instead. He was the first cabinet-level official from the West but had little impact before his death from tuberculosis on December 14, 1806, at the age of 46.

== Early life and family ==
John Breckinridge's grandfather, Alexander Breckenridge (1686–1743), immigrated from Ireland to Bucks County, Pennsylvania, around 1728; the Breckinridge family had originated in Ayrshire, Scotland, before migrating to Ulster (possibly County Antrim or County Londonderry) probably in the late 17th century. (Note: Davis notes that John Breckinridge changed the spelling of the family name for unknown reasons during his time in the Virginia House of Delegates between 1781 and 1784. See Davis, p. 5.) In 1740, the family moved to Augusta County, Virginia, near the city of Staunton, and Alexander died there in 1743.

John Breckinridge was born in Augusta County on December 2, 1760, the second of six children of Robert Breckenridge (1720–1773) and his second wife, Lettice (Preston) Breckenridge (1728–1797). His mother was the daughter of John Preston of Virginia's Preston political family. Robert Breckenridge had two children by a previous marriage, and through one of these half-brothers John Breckinridge was uncle to future Congressman James D. Breckinridge. (Note: The paternity of James D. Breckinridge is disputed; see The Breckinridges of Kentucky, p. 8.) A veteran of the French and Indian War, Robert Breckenridge had farmed as well as served first as Augusta County's under-sheriff, then as sheriff, then justice of the peace. Soon after John Breckinridge's birth, the family moved southward along the Wilderness Road to Botetourt County where Robert Breckenridge farmed, as well as became a constable and justice of the peace, and served in the Virginia militia. He died in 1773, leaving 12-year-old John 300 acres (1.2 km^{2}) of land, one slave, and half-ownership of another slave.

Breckinridge received a private education suitable to his class, possibly including Augusta Academy (now Washington and Lee University), but any records containing this information have been lost. After his father's death, the younger Breckinridge helped support the family by selling whiskey, brandy, and hemp. He learned surveying from his uncle, William Preston, and between 1774 and 1779, held a clerical job in the Botetourt County land office in Fincastle. Preston sought opportunities for his nephew to attend private schools alongside his sons, but Breckinridge's other responsibilities interfered with his attendance. Preston also nominated Breckinridge as deputy surveyor of Montgomery County, a position he accepted after passing the requisite exam on February 1, 1780. Later that year, he joined his cousin, future Kentucky Senator John Brown, at the College of William & Mary. The instructors who influenced him most were Reverend James Madison and George Wythe.

The American Revolutionary War forced the college to close in 1781, and during various times during the conflict British, French, and American troops used them as barracks while controlling the surrounding area. Although William C. Davis records that Breckinridge had previously served as an ensign in the Botetourt County militia, Harrison notes that the most reliable records of Virginians' military service do not indicate his participation in the Revolutionary War, and less reliable sources mention him as a subaltern in the Virginia militia. If Breckinridge served, Harrison speculates that such occurred in one or two short 1780 militia campaigns supporting Nathanael Greene's army in southwest Virginia.

=== Early political career ===
Although he had not sought the office and was not old enough to serve, Botetourt County voters twice elected Breckinridge to represent them part-time as one of the western county's representatives in the Virginia House of Delegates in late 1780. Though without documentary support, some claim fellow delegates twice refused Breckinridge his seat because of his age, but his constituents reelected him each time, and he was seated the third time. His legislative colleagues included Patrick Henry, Benjamin Harrison, John Tyler, John Taylor of Caroline, George Nicholas, Daniel Boone, and Benjamin Logan.

Prevented from meeting at Williamsburg due to fears of a British attack there, the House convened May 7, 1781, in Richmond, but failed to achieve a quorum. Due to British General Charles Cornwallis' advance on Richmond on May 10, the legislators adjourned to Charlottesville on May 24. Breckinridge arrived in Charlottesville on May 28; a quorum was present to conduct legislative business through June 3. The next morning, Jack Jouett rode into the city, warning the legislators that 250 light cavalrymen under Banastre Tarleton were approaching. Legislators quickly adjourned to Staunton and fled for their horses. Days later, they completed the session's business there. Breckinridge stayed at his mother's house between sessions, rejoining the legislature in Richmond in November 1781. Much of the session consisted of adopting resolutions of thanks for individuals who had made that city safe by defeating Cornwallis at Yorktown.

Financial difficulties prevented Breckinridge's return to college. He did not seek reelection in 1782; instead, he spent a year earning money by surveying, and was reelected to the House of Delegates in 1783, joining his legislative colleagues in May. He also joined the Constitutional Society of Virginia; fellow society members included future U.S. presidents James Madison and James Monroe. The House adjourned June 28, 1783, and Breckinridge returned to the William and Mary College, studying through the end of the year, excepting the legislative session in November and December. With the war over, he urged that no economic or political penalties be imposed on former Loyalists. In contrast to his later political views, he desired a stronger central government than provided for in the Articles of Confederation; he argued that the national government could not survive unless it could tax its citizens, a power it did not have under the Articles.

Financial problems caused Breckinridge to leave the college after the spring semester in 1784. Because of his studies earlier in the year, he had no time to campaign for reelection to the House of Delegates, so he asked his brother Joseph and his cousin John Preston to campaign on his behalf. Initially, his prospects seemed favorable, but he was beaten by future Virginia Congressman George Hancock. After the defeat, voters from Montgomery County – where Breckinridge had previously been a surveyor – chose him to represent them in the House. As a Virginia legislator, Breckinridge served on the prestigious committees on Propositions and Grievances, Courts of Justice, Religion, and Investigation of the Land Offices. His fellow committee members included Henry Tazewell, Carter Henry Harrison, Edward Carrington, Spencer Roane, John Marshall, Richard Bland Lee, and Wilson Cary Nicholas. Inspired by his legislative service, he spent the summer between legislative sessions studying to become a lawyer. The legislative session focused on domestic issues like whether Virginia should establish a tax to benefit religion in the state. Breckinridge was not associated with any denomination, and his writings indicate that he was opposed to such a tax. Instead, he and James Madison secured approval of a religious liberty bill first proposed by Thomas Jefferson over five years earlier. The legislature rose on January 7, 1785, and Breckinridge was admitted to the bar later that year, beginning practice in Charlottesville.

=== Marriage and children ===
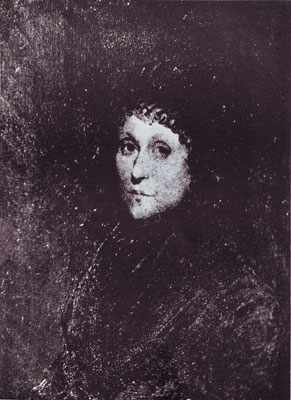
Mary Hopkins ("Polly") Cabell Breckinridge

On June 28, 1785, Breckinridge married Mary Hopkins ("Polly") Cabell (1769–1858), daughter of Joseph Cabell (1732–1798), a member of the Cabell political family. Polly's dowry included a 400-acre (1.6-km^{2}) plantation in Albemarle County dubbed "The Glebe". Nine children were born to the John and Polly Breckinridge – Letitia Preston (1786–1831), Joseph "Cabell" (1788–1823), Mary Hopkins (1790–1793), Robert Wright (1792–1870), Mary Ann (1795–1817), John (1797–1841), Robert Jefferson (1800–1871), William Lewis (1803–1876), and James Monroe (1806–1820).

Polly, Cabell, and Letitia all fell ill but survived a smallpox epidemic in 1793; however, Mary Hopkins and their first son named Robert died. Cabell Breckinridge would later follow a similar career as a planter, lawyer and politician, and become Speaker of the Kentucky House of Representatives and later Kentucky's Secretary of State. Other sons became ministers and planters; the family's loyalties would be split during the American Civil War long after this man's death. Cabell Beckinridge's son John C. Breckinridge continued the family legal, planter and political traditions and become U.S. vice president and a presidential candidate, only to side with the Confederacy during the American Civil War. Meanwhile his brother John Breckinridge also attended the same university, receiving a degree from Princeton Theological Seminary, before serving as chaplain of the U.S. House of Representatives, and president of Oglethorpe College (now Oglethorpe University) in Georgia. Robert Jefferson Breckinridge became superintendent of public instruction under Governor William Owsley and became known as the father of Kentucky's public education system. William Lewis Breckinridge became a prominent Presbyterian minister, serving as moderator of the Presbyterian General Assembly in 1859 and later as president of Centre College in Danville, Kentucky, and Oakland College in Yale, Mississippi. In 1804, this Breckinridge's daughter Letitia married Alfred W. Grayson, son of Virginia Senator William Grayson. Alfred Grayson died in 1808, and in 1816, the widowed Letitia married Peter Buell Porter, who would later serve as Secretary of War under President John Quincy Adams.

Meanwhile, farming at the Glebe proved barely enough for Breckinridge's growing family. Breckinridge's legal career provided enough money for some comforts but required long hours and difficult work. Patrick Henry regularly represented clients opposite Breckinridge, and John Marshall both referred clients to him and asked him to represent his own clients in his absence. Though still interested in politics, Breckinridge refused to campaign for the people's support. He believed changes were needed to the Articles of Confederation and agreed with much of the proposed U.S. constitution, but he did not support equal representation of the states in the Senate nor the federal judiciary. Heeding the advice of his brother James and his friend, Archibald Stuart, he did not seek election as a delegate to Virginia's ratification convention.

== Relocation to Kentucky ==
Breckinridge's half-brothers, Andrew and Robert, moved to Kentucky in 1781, and his brother William followed in 1783. By 1785, Andrew and Robert were trustees of Louisville. Their letters described Kentucky's abundant land and plentiful legal business, in contrast to the crowded bar and scarce unclaimed land in Virginia. By 1788, Breckinridge was convinced that Kentucky offered him more opportunity, and the next year, he traveled west to seek land on which to construct an estate. Although inaccurate reports of his death reached Virginia, he arrived safely in Kentucky on April 15, 1789, and returned to Virginia in June. The following year, he paid 360 pounds sterling for 600 acres (2.4 km^{2}) along the North Elkhorn Creek about 6 miles (9.7 km) from present-day Lexington, Kentucky. The land, purchased from his only sister Betsy's father-in-law, lay adjacent to land owned by his sister, and in 1792, he purchased an adjacent 1,000 acres (4.0 km^{2}), bringing his total holdings in Kentucky to 1,600 acres (6.5 km^{2}). After the purchase, he instructed William Russell, a friend already living in Kentucky, to find tenants to lease and improve the land.

In February 1792, Breckinridge, a Democratic-Republican, was elected to the U.S. House of Representatives over token opposition. On the date of the election, he wrote to Archibald Stuart, "The People appearing willing to elect, I could have no objection to serve them one Winter in Congress." Despite this, he left for Kentucky in March 1793 and resigned without serving a day in Congress, which convened on March 4. He chose the longer but safer route to Kentucky, joining a group of flatboats at Brownsville, Pennsylvania, for the trip down the Monongahela and Ohio rivers to Limestone (now Maysville, Kentucky). His family, along with 25 slaves, arrived in April and established a slave plantation which they named "Cabell's Dale". By the time of Breckinridge's move, he owned 30,000 acres (120 km^{2}) in Kentucky.

== Domestic life in Kentucky ==
When he arrived in Kentucky, much of Breckinridge's land was occupied by tenant farmers whose leases had not yet expired. He planted rye and wheat on 20 acres (0.081 km^{2}) of unleased land and sent 11 slaves and an overseer to clear land for the fall planting. Eventually, his crops at Cabell's Dale included corn, wheat, rye, barley, hay, grass seed, and hemp, but he refused to grow tobacco, a major cash crop, which he found too vulnerable to over-cultivation. He also bred thoroughbred horses, planted an orchard, and practiced law. He engaged in land speculation, particularly in the Northwest Territory, and at various times owned interests in iron and salt works, but these ventures were never very successful.

As his plantation became more productive, Breckinridge became interested in ways to sell his excess goods. On August 26, 1793, he became a charter member of the Democratic Society of Kentucky, which lobbied the federal government to secure unrestricted use of the Mississippi River from Spain. Breckinridge was elected chairman, Robert Todd and John Bradford were chosen as vice-chairmen, and Thomas Todd and Thomas Bodley were elected as clerks. Breckinridge authored a tract entitled Remonstrance of the Citizens West of the Mountains to the President and Congress of the United States and may have also written To the Inhabitants of the United States West of the Allegany (sic) and Apalachian (sic) Mountains. He pledged funding to French minister Edmond-Charles Genêt's proposed military operation against Spain, but Genêt was recalled before it could be executed. Although alarmed that frontier settlers might initiate war with Spain, President George Washington made no immediate attempt to obtain use of the Mississippi, which the society maintained was "the natural right of the citizens of this Commonwealth". The resistance of the eastern states, particularly Federalist politicians, caused Breckinridge to reconsider his support of a strong central government.

Breckinridge was also concerned with easing overland transport of goods to Virginia. In mid-1795, he, Robert Barr, Elijah Craig, and Harry Toulmin formed a committee to raise funds for a road connecting the Cumberland Gap to central Kentucky. Breckinridge was disappointed with the quality of the route, which was finished in late 1796, concluding that the individual maintaining it was keeping most of the tolls instead of using them for the road's upkeep.

Breckinridge was also interested in education. Before moving to Kentucky, he accumulated a substantial library of histories, biographies, law and government texts, and classical literature. Frequently, he allowed aspiring lawyers and students access to the library, which was one of the most extensive in the west. He also provided funding for a municipal library in Lexington. His lobbying for a college to be established in Lexington bore fruit with the opening of Transylvania Seminary (now Transylvania University) in 1788. He was elected to the seminary's board of trustees on October 9, 1793, and supported hiring Harry Toulmin as president in February 1794 and consolidating the seminary with Kentucky Academy in 1796. Conservatives on the board and in the Kentucky General Assembly forced Toulmin – a liberal Unitarian – to resign in 1796, and Breckinridge's enthusiasm for his trusteeship waned. He attended board meetings less frequently and resigned in late 1797.

== Kentucky Attorney General ==
Kentucky needed qualified governmental leaders, and on December 19, 1793, Governor Isaac Shelby appointed Breckinridge attorney general. Three weeks after accepting, he was offered the post of District Attorney for the Federal District of Kentucky, but he declined. Secretary of State Edmund Randolph directed Shelby to prevent French agents in Kentucky from organizing an expedition against Spanish Louisiana. On Breckinridge's advice, Shelby responded that he lacked the authority to interfere. Lack of funding prevented the expedition, but Shelby's noncommittal response helped prompt passage of the Neutrality Act of 1794 which outlawed participation by U.S. citizens in such expeditions.

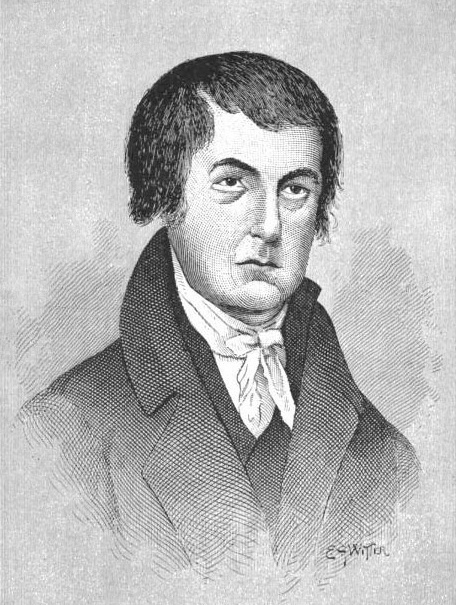
Humphrey Marshall defeated Breckinridge for a Senate seat in 1794.

In November 1794, the Democratic-Republicans nominated Breckinridge to succeed John Edwards in the U.S. Senate. Federalists were generally unpopular in Kentucky, but the signing of Pinckney's Treaty – which temporarily secured Kentucky's use of the Mississippi River – and Anthony Wayne's expedition against the Indians in the Northwest Territory prompted a surge of support for the federal government in Kentucky. The election's first ballot reflected this, as Federalist candidate Humphrey Marshall received 18 votes to Breckinridge's 16, John Fowler's 8, and 7 votes for the incumbent Edwards. On the runoff ballot, Marshall was elected over Breckinridge by a vote of 28–22. Harrison posits that Marshall's incumbency in the General Assembly may have aided his election but notes that Marshall downplayed its significance.

In May 1796, Kentucky's gubernatorial electors convened to choose Shelby's successor. Their votes were split among four candidates; frontiersman Benjamin Logan received 21 votes, Baptist minister James Garrard received 17, Thomas Todd received 14, and Breckinridge's cousin, Senator John Brown, received 1. The Kentucky Constitution did not specify whether a plurality or a majority was required for election, but the electors held a runoff vote. Most of Todd's supporters voted for Garrard, and he won the election. Breckinridge claimed he had no authority to intervene but declared that, as a private citizen, he believed Logan should be governor. The state senate was authorized to settle disputed elections, but they, too, refused to intervene. Breckinridge resigned as attorney general on November 30, 1797; the extension of the attorney general's duties to include representing the state in federal district court as well as the Kentucky Court of Appeals, and reluctance to serve under Garrard after publicly declaring he had no right to his office may have contributed to the decision. A month later, he declared his candidacy to fill a vacancy in the Fayette County delegation to the Kentucky House of Representatives. Of the 1,323 votes cast, he garnered 594 (45%), the most of any of the six candidates in the race.

== Kentucky House of Representatives ==
Breckinridge pressed to reform the state's criminal code, which was based on the English system and imposed the death penalty for over 200 different crimes. Inspired by Thomas Jefferson's failed attempt to reform Virginia's code, he first asked the Lexington Democratic Society to study ways to make punishments more proportional to crimes in November 1793. By 1796, he was drafting a new code based on the principles that criminals should be rehabilitated, victims should be compensated for their injury, the public should be reimbursed for the cost of prosecuting the criminal, and the punishment's severity should serve as a deterrent for would-be offenders. In January 1798, he introduced his proposed code in the General Assembly. A month later, the Assembly reformed the code, abolishing the death penalty for every crime except first-degree murder.

=== Kentucky Resolutions ===
In August, Breckinridge traveled to Virginia's Sweet Springs to improve his health. He visited family and friends while there, but the exact dates and locations he visited are not known. At some point, he obtained a draft of resolutions written by Vice President Thomas Jefferson denouncing the recently enacted Alien and Sedition Acts. Jefferson wished to keep his authorship secret, and Breckinridge accepted credit for them during his life. In 1814, John Taylor revealed Jefferson's authorship; Breckinridge's grandson, John C. Breckinridge, wrote Jefferson for confirmation of Taylor's claims. Cautioning that the passage of time and his failing memory might cause him to inaccurately recount the details, Jefferson responded that he, Breckinridge, Wilson Nicholas, and possibly James Madison met at Monticello, at a date Jefferson could not recall, to discuss the need for resolutions denouncing the Alien and Sedition Acts. They decided that Jefferson would pen the resolutions and that Breckinridge would introduce them in the Kentucky legislature upon his return to that state.

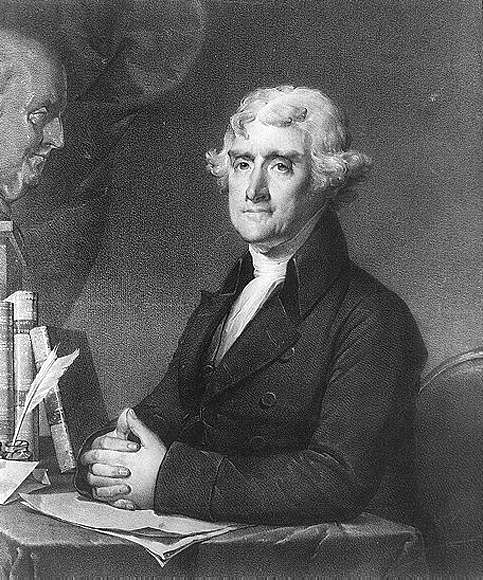
Thomas Jefferson composed the original Kentucky Resolutions.

Letters between Nicholas and Jefferson indicate a different series of events. In a letter dated October 4, 1798, Nicholas informed Jefferson that he had given "a copy of the resolutions you sent me" to Breckinridge, who would introduce them in Kentucky. The letter also indicated that this was a deviation from the original plan to deliver the draft to a legislator in North Carolina for introduction in the legislature there. Nicholas felt that recipient was too closely associated with Jefferson, risking his being discovered as the resolutions' author. According to Nicholas, Breckinridge wanted to discuss the draft with Jefferson, but Nicholas advised against the meeting, fearing it could implicate Jefferson. A subsequent letter from Jefferson expressed his approval of Nicholas' actions. Lowell Harrison notes that after Breckinridge left Virginia, his contacts with Jefferson were few until his election to the Senate in 1801. Harrison considered it unlikely that Jefferson was mistaken about a meeting between the two to discuss a matter as important as the resolutions, positing that Jefferson may have met separately with Breckinridge and Nicholas to discuss the resolutions, and that the meeting with Breckinridge was kept secret from Nicholas. Because of the uncertainty surrounding Breckinridge's activities in Virginia in 1798, the extent of his influence on Jefferson's original draft of the resolutions is unknown.

In Garrard's November 5, 1798, State of the Commonwealth address, he encouraged the General Assembly to declare its views on the Alien and Sedition Acts. Breckinridge was chosen as chairman of a three-person committee to carry out the governor's charge. The resolutions that the committee brought to the floor on November 10 became known as the Kentucky Resolutions. The first seven were exactly as Jefferson had written them, but Breckinridge modified the last two, eliminating Jefferson's suggestion of nullifying the unpopular acts. During the debate on the House floor, Breckinridge endorsed nullification if Congress would not repeal the acts after a majority of states declared their opposition to them. Federalist William Murray led opposition to the resolutions in the House but was the only dissenting vote on five of the nine; John Pope led similarly unsuccessful Federalist opposition in the Senate. Upon concurrence of both houses, Garrard signed the resolutions.

Federalist state legislatures, primarily those north of the Potomac River, sent the Kentucky General Assembly negative responses to the resolutions. Nicholas convinced Jefferson that Kentucky should adopt a second set of resolutions affirming the first, lest the lack of a reply be seen acquiescence. Jefferson refused to compose these resolutions, maintaining that there were sufficiently talented individuals in Kentucky to compose them and fearing still that he would be discovered as the author of the first set. Breckinridge, chosen Speaker of the Kentucky House of Representatives at the outset of the 1799 session, took on the task, drafting resolutions reasserting the original principles and endorsing nullification. (Note: Although some historians have questioned Breckinridge's authorship of the second set of resolutions, Jefferson biographer Nathan Schachner noted that original drafts of those resolutions, in Breckinridge's handwriting, are among his papers housed at the Library of Congress. See Schachner, p. 628.) The resolutions unanimously passed the House. The Federalist minority in the Senate opposed them, especially the endorsement of nullification, but that chamber also adopted the resolutions as written. Breckinridge's presumed authorship of the original resolutions and his subsequent defense of them caused his popularity to soar in Kentucky.

=== Kentucky Constitution of 1799 ===
Some Kentucky citizens were already displeased with parts of the state's constitution, and the disputed gubernatorial election of 1796 had added to the enthusiasm of those calling for a constitutional convention to revise it. Breckinridge opposed such a call, fearing changes would imperil his wealth and power. John Breckinridge asked, "Where is the difference whether I am robbed of my horse by a highway-man, or of my slave by a set of people called a Convention?... If they can by one experiment emancipate our slaves; the same principle pursued, will enable them at a second experiment to extinguish our land titles; both are held by rights equally sound." The desire for a convention was so strong, even in aristocratic Fayette County, that Breckinridge's position nearly cost him his seat in the legislature. Seeking election to a full term in May 1798, he was the seventh-highest vote-getter, securing the last of Fayette County's seats in the legislature by only eight votes. Despite the efforts of conservatives like Breckinridge and George Nicholas, in late 1798, the General Assembly called a convention for July 22, 1799. Delegates to the convention were to be elected in May 1799, and the conservatives immediately began organizing slates of candidates that would represent their interests. Popular because of his role in securing adoption of the Kentucky Resolutions, Breckinridge was among the six conservative candidates promoted in Fayette County, all of whom were elected. Out of the fifty-eight men who arrived in Frankfort in late July as convention delegates, 57 were slaveowners and 50 held substantial property. Between the election and the convention, Breckinridge and Judge Caleb Wallace worked with Nicholas (who did not seek election as a delegate) to draft resolutions that Breckinridge would introduce at the convention in an attempt to steer the proceedings toward conservative positions.

The largest group of delegates at the convention – about 18 in number – were aristocrats who advocated protection of their wealth and status, including instituting voice voting in the legislature (which left legislators vulnerable to intimidation), safeguarding slavery, and limiting the power of the electorate. A smaller group led by Green Clay and Robert Johnson consisted mostly of planters who opposed most limits on the power of the legislature, which they believed was superior to the executive and judicial branches. A third group, led by future governor John Adair, agreed with the notion of legislative supremacy, but opposed limits on other branches of the government. The smallest group was the most populist and was led by John Bailey. The conservative faction strengthened the previous constitution's slavery protections by denying suffrage to free blacks and mulattoes. Legislative apportionment based on population, the addition of a lieutenant governor, and voice voting of the legislature – all issues advocated by Breckinridge – were also adopted. He was unable to preserve the electoral college that elected the governor and state senators, but the direct election of these officers was balanced by a provision that county sheriffs and judges be appointed by the governor and confirmed by the Senate. Attempts to make judicial decisions subject to legislative approval were defeated after Breckinridge defended the extant judicial system. He was also the architect of the constitution's provisions for amendment, which made changing the document difficult, but not entirely impossible. Because of his leading role in the convention, Breckinridge was regarded as the father of the resultant constitution, which was ratified in 1799, and emerged from the convention as the leader of his party. He was reelected as Speaker of the House in 1800.

== U.S. Senator ==
On November 20, 1800, the Kentucky General Assembly elected Breckinridge to the U.S. Senate by a vote of 68–13 over John Adair. He was eligible for the special congressional session called for March 4, 1801, but his summons to the session remained undelivered at the Lexington post office until March 5, and he consequently missed the entire session. When he left for Washington, D.C., late in the year, he left several of his pending legal cases in the hands of rising attorney Henry Clay, who would later become U.S. Secretary of State.

Although Democratic-Republicans held a narrow majority in the Senate, the Federalist senators were both experienced and devoted to their cause. Breckinridge acted as floor leader for the Democratic-Republicans and newly elected president, Thomas Jefferson. His proposed repeal of the Federalist-supported Judicial Act of 1801, which had increased the number of federal courts and judges, was particularly controversial. On January 4, 1802, he presented caseload data to argue that the new courts and judges were unnecessary. Federalist leader Gouverneur Morris countered that the proposal was unconstitutional; once established, courts were inviolate, he maintained. On January 20, Federalist Jonathan Dayton moved to return the bill to a committee to consider amendments. South Carolina's John E. Colhoun, a Democratic-Republican, voted with the Federalists, and the result was a 15–15 tie. Empowered to break the tie, Jefferson's vice president, Aaron Burr, voted with the Federalists. The five-man committee consisted of three Federalists, enough to prevent the bill's return to the floor, but when Vermont Senator Stephen R. Bradley, who had traveled home because of a family illness, returned to the chamber, the Democratic-Republicans regained a majority and introduced a successful discharge petition. In one last attempt to derail the legislation in debate, Federalists argued that the judiciary would strike down the repeal as unconstitutional; Breckinridge denied the notion that the courts had the power to invalidate an act of Congress. On February 3, the Senate repealed the act by a vote of 16–15, with the House concurring a month later.

=== Louisiana Purchase ===
Breckinridge advocated internal improvements and formed a coalition of legislators from South Carolina, Georgia, Tennessee and Kentucky to support a system of roads connecting the Southern coastal states with the western frontier, but the routes they proposed proved impossible to construct with the technology available at the time. Spanish revocation of Kentucky's right of deposit at New Orleans – in violation of Pinckney's Treaty – further frustrated and angered frontier residents. Although many desired war with Spain, Jefferson believed a diplomatic resolution was possible and urged restraint. Federalists, seeking to divide the Democratic-Republicans and curry favor with the West, abandoned their usual advocacy of peace. Pennsylvania Federalist James Ross introduced a measure allocating $5 million and raising 50,000 militiamen to seize the Louisiana Territory from Spain. Cognizant of Jefferson's desire for more time, Breckinridge offered a substitute resolution on February 23, 1803, allocating 80,000 troops and unlimited funds for the potential invasion of New Orleans, but he left their use at the discretion of the president. Breckinridge's resolution was adopted after a heated debate.

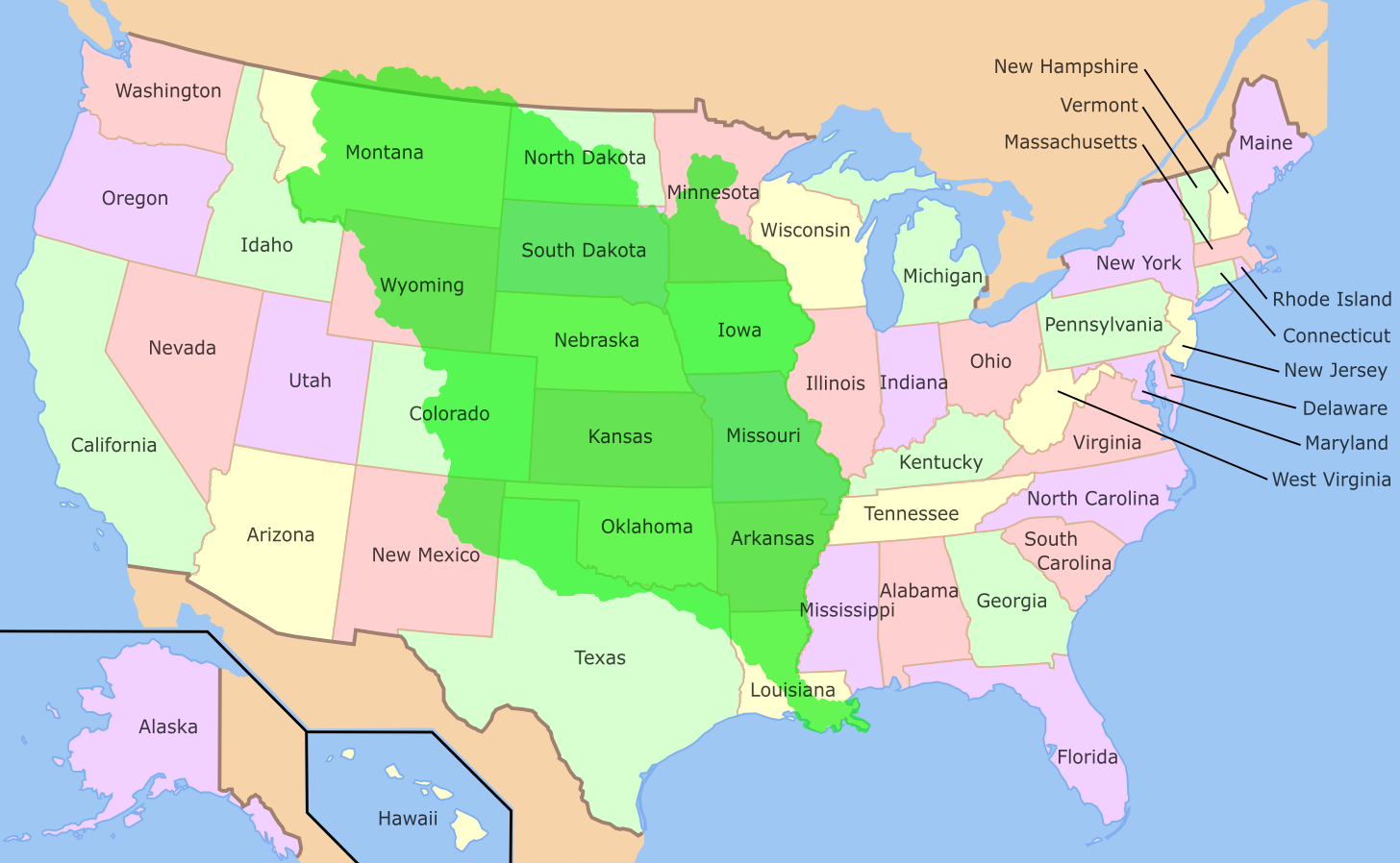
The Louisiana Purchase, superimposed on a map of the modern United States

Before an invasion became necessary, U.S. ambassadors learned that Spain had ceded Louisiana to France via the Third Treaty of San Ildefonso, and France offered to sell the territory to the U.S. Robert R. Livingston and James Monroe, U.S. ministers to France, agreed to the purchase, even though they had not been given the authority to do so. Jefferson was pleased with the purchase, but feared he had no constitutional authority to effect it. In an August 12, 1803, letter to Breckinridge, Jefferson discussed his constitutional misgivings about the Louisiana Purchase and proposed that Breckinridge introduce a simple constitutional amendment in the Senate: "Louisiana, as ceded by France to the U.S., is made a part of the U.S." Breckinridge ignored the proposed amendment and immediately formed a coalition of western senators to approve the purchase.

After the purchase was approved, Jefferson drafted a system of governing the newly acquired territory. Fearing that the Federalists would oppose any system he had devised, he delivered his draft to Breckinridge and asked him to introduce it in the Senate as his own. To maintain the ruse, Breckinridge moved that a committee be formed to recommend a plan for governing Louisiana Territory. Working through the committee, he brought Jefferson's plan to the Senate floor with its essentials intact. Because the plan provided for the taxation of Louisiana residents without giving them representation in Congress, Federalists and some Democratic-Republicans opposed it. Nevertheless, it passed by a vote of 26–6.

=== Consideration for the vice presidency ===
By July 1803, citizens of the western states, desiring more representation in the federal government and intent on breaking the pattern of nominating a Virginians and New Yorkers for most important federal offices, were advocating Breckinridge's nomination as vice president in the 1804 presidential election. Thomas Jefferson was expected to be reelected, but most Democratic-Republicans had grown disenchanted with Vice President Aaron Burr; he would not be Jefferson's running mate. Breckinridge's service as Senate floor leader made him a natural choice.

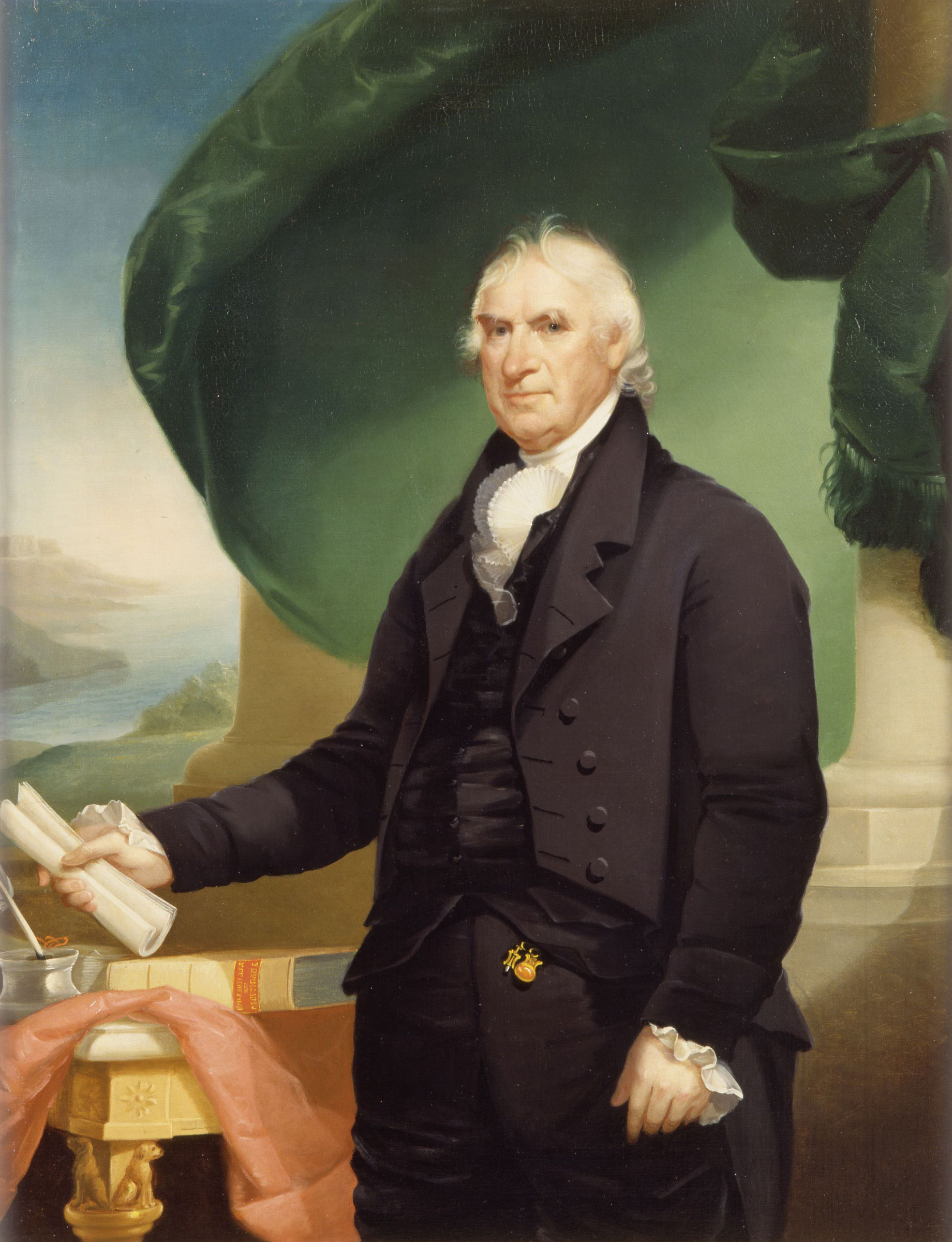
George Clinton was nominated for vice president in 1804 instead of Breckinridge.

The Democratic-Republican congressional caucus convened February 25, 1804. Contrary to previous conventions, the proceedings were open and formal. Afraid that taking vice presidential nominations from the floor would precipitate divisive oratory, chairman Stephen Bradley called for open balloting for the nomination. New York's George Clinton received a majority with 67 votes; Breckinridge garnered 20 votes, mostly from western delegates, and the remaining votes were scattered among 4 other candidates. Historian James C. Klotter concluded that the solons felt a ticket composed of Jefferson, a Virginian, and Breckinridge, a former Virginian, made little political sense. Breckinridge acceded to the choice; some reports hold that he asked his colleagues not to vote for him at all. Before the caucus adjourned, a thirteen-man committee was formed to promote the election of the Democratic-Republican ticket; Breckinridge represented Kentucky on the committee.

Westerners expressed dissent over Clinton's nomination instead of their preferred candidate. The June 29, 1804, edition of Philadelphia's Independent Gazetteer carried an editorial, signed "True American", that denounced the Virginia–New York coalition, attacked Clinton as too old, and called for electors to vote for Breckinridge for vice president. Potential electors in western states pledged to carry out "True American"'s proposal. Allan B. Magruder attempted to warn Breckinridge in advance of the editorial's publication, but his letter – dated June 23, 1804 – did not reach Breckinridge until July 1. On July 5, Breckinridge published a response in the Kentucky Palladium denouncing the proposal and encouraging electors to vote for the Democratic-Republican slate as nominated. He requested that all newspapers that had printed the "True American" editorial also print his response.

In the same edition that carried Breckinridge's response, Daniel Bradford, editor of the Kentucky Gazette, penned an editorial revealing Breckinridge's close friend, William Stevenson, as the author of the "True American" article and noting that Breckinridge had waited nearly a week to publish a response, and claiming the delay was intended to allow him to gauge public sentiment before denouncing Stevenson's proposal. Bradford had been at odds with Breckinridge since the 1799 constitutional convention, and his dislike intensified when Breckinridge refused to use his influence to gain appointments for Bradford's relatives – John Bradford and James Bradford – as Public Printer of the United States and Secretary of Louisiana Territory, respectively. Bradford's claims were quickly endorsed by anonymous editorial writers in newspapers across the west.

Stevenson swore under oath that Breckinridge had no part in composing the "True American" article. Breckinridge publicly stated that Bradford's brother, Charles, had shown him a draft of the "True American" editorial prior to its publication and asked his opinion of it; Breckinridge advised him not to publish it, and Bradford temporarily obliged. An illness, Breckinridge said, had confined him to his home at the time of the editorial's publication, and he was not aware that the Independent Gazetteer had printed it until he attended the court at Frankfort days later; he immediately returned home and composed his rebuttal. In light of this evidence, few still maintained the credibility of the reports in the Kentucky Gazette by the time of the election. Every Kentucky elector voted for both Jefferson and Clinton.

=== Other Senate matters ===
After the Louisiana Purchase, Breckinridge focused on securing a vote to present the Twelfth Amendment to the states for ratification. He did not agree with all the changes effected by the amendment, the primary purpose of which was to direct presidential electors to vote separately for president and vice president; he supported abolishing the electoral college, electing both officials by popular vote. Democratic-Republicans wanted the amendment adopted before the 1804 election to avoid Jefferson's being saddled with a hostile vice president again, and Breckinridge announced his support for the amendment in late October. With several members of his party absent, he would not be able to secure the two-thirds majority needed to send the amendment to the states for ratification. Recognizing this fact, Federalists pushed for an immediate vote, putting Breckinridge in the position of trying to delay a vote on a measure both he and his constituents supported. Debate began on November 23 after several Democratic-Republicans had returned. South Carolina Federalist Pierce Butler contended that the amendment would allow large states to pick the president; James Jackson, a Democratic-Republican from Georgia, countered by taunting, "Never will there be a Federal President or Vice-President again elected, to the end of time." Federalists moved adjournment at 6:00 p.m. on December 2, but Breckinridge, determined to hold a vote that night, blocked the move and took the floor for the first time in days. By 10:00 p.m., senators clamored for a vote, and the measure was approved 22–10. State legislatures quickly acted on the amendment, and by September 23, 1804, it was declared in force for the upcoming election.

Other business in the session included creating a special fund that would allow Jefferson to recover the USS Philadelphia, which had been captured off the coast of northern Africa, and the repeal of the Bankruptcy Act of 1800; Breckinridge supported the passage of both measures. He feared that passage of an act making permanent the pay raises for executive administrative personnel first enacted in 1799 would hurt his party in the upcoming elections, especially in the House, but the act passed and there was no significant backlash at the polls. Robert Wright's measure adjourning Congress to Baltimore, Maryland, in protest of legislators' poor accommodations in Washington, D.C., was defeated by a vote of 9–19, but Breckinridge considered the issue of moving the U.S. capital worthy of further study. Breckinridge supported the successful impeachment of federal judge John Pickering and also served on the Senate committee that prepared the rules governing the impeachment trial of Supreme Court Justice Samuel Chase. The latter impeachment was widely seen as politically motivated, and some Democratic-Republicans joined the Federalist minority in voting for acquittal. Majorities were obtained on only three of the eight articles of impeachment, and each of those fell at least three votes short of the required two-thirds majority. Breckinridge and three other Democratic-Republicans voted to convict on every article except the fifth, on which every senator sided with Chase.

== U.S. Attorney General ==
When U.S. Attorney General Levi Lincoln resigned in December 1804, Jefferson and Treasury Secretary Albert Gallatin sought a replacement. Virginia's John Thomson Mason, Gallatin's first choice, declined the appointment. U.S. Navy Secretary Robert Smith desired the office, and Jefferson agreed to appoint him, contingent upon finding a suitable replacement for Smith as Secretary of the Navy. Jefferson appointed Massachusetts Congressman Jacob Crowninshield to replace Smith, and both appointments were confirmed by the Senate March 3, 1805. Crowninshield refused his appointment, however, and Smith was forced to remain as Secretary of the Navy. Jefferson then offered the position to Breckinridge, Gallatin's second choice. Breckinridge resigned from the Senate on August 7, 1805, to accept the appointment. He was the first U.S. cabinet-level official from west of the Allegheny Mountains, and his appointment boosted Jefferson's popularity in the west. Lowell Harrison called the appointment a mistake by Jefferson, not because Breckinridge lacked any qualifications, but because Jefferson was not able to replace his leadership in the Senate. He noted that after Breckinridge's departure from the chamber, the Federalist minority experienced a revival of influence under the leadership of Connecticut's Uriah Tracy.

Stopping to visit with friends en route to Washington, D.C., Breckinridge arrived on December 7, 1805. His nomination was confirmed by the Senate on December 20. He was influential in Jefferson's infrequent cabinet meetings, where he served as the lone voice of the west. His most notable advisory opinion – that no local government in the Territory of Orleans had the power to tax federal property there – was upheld in the Supreme Court by Chief Justice John Marshall in McCulloch v. Maryland. He was sworn in to represent the federal government before the Supreme Court when it convened – about a week late because of the illness of several justices – on February 12, 1806. He was spared the awkwardness of practicing before a judge he had voted to impeach because Samuel Chase was absent for the Court's entire six-week term. The court heard only six cases during the term; most of them were cases Breckinridge had inherited from his predecessor, and Harrison wrote that none were of lasting importance. Cases such as Maley v. Shattuck involved international maritime law – an area with which Breckinridge was not familiar – and arose from the Napoleonic Wars, which complicated neutral American trade with both Britain and France. During the term, Breckinridge lost four cases, won one, and the justices sent one back for retrial in a lower court.

== Death and legacy ==
Breckinridge returned to Cabell's Dale in early 1806 and fell ill in June. In July, he visited Kentucky's Olympian Springs, hoping it would aid his recovery, but it did not. Doctors disagreed on the cause of his illness, with diagnoses ranging from typhus fever to stomach ailments. He attempted to return to Washington, D.C., on October 22, but while his horse was being prepared for the journey, he collapsed in pain and had to be helped back inside. Friends and relatives hoped for a recovery that never came, and he died on December 14, 1806. The cause of death was eventually determined to be tuberculosis. According to family tradition, Polly Breckinridge was so distraught over her husband's death that she went blind from her incessant crying. Breckinridge was first buried at Cabell's Dale on December 16 but was later reinterred in Lexington Cemetery.

At the time of his death, Breckinridge owned over 20,000 acres (81 km^{2}) of land, and his net worth was estimated at more than $20,000. With a workforce of nearly 70 slaves, he was one of the largest slaveholders in the state. The breeding of horses and mules at Cabell's Dale had become more profitable than selling the excess crops raised there. His daughter, Mary Ann, and her husband, David Castleman, inherited the horse and mule breeding operations, which eventually became the thoroughbred stable of Castleton Lyons. Breckinridge County, Kentucky, created from a portion of Hardin County in 1799, was named in Breckinridge's honor.

== Notes ==
Legal offices
Preceded by George Nicholas	Attorney General of Kentucky; 1793–1797	Succeeded by James Blair
Preceded by Levi Lincoln	U.S. Attorney General; Served under: Thomas Jefferson; 1805–1806	Succeeded by Caesar A. Rodney
U.S. Senate
Preceded by Humphrey Marshall	U.S. senator (Class 3) from Kentucky; 1801–1805; Served alongside: John Brown, Buckner Thruston	Succeeded by John Adair
