= Humphrey Marshall (politician) =

American politician (1760–1841)

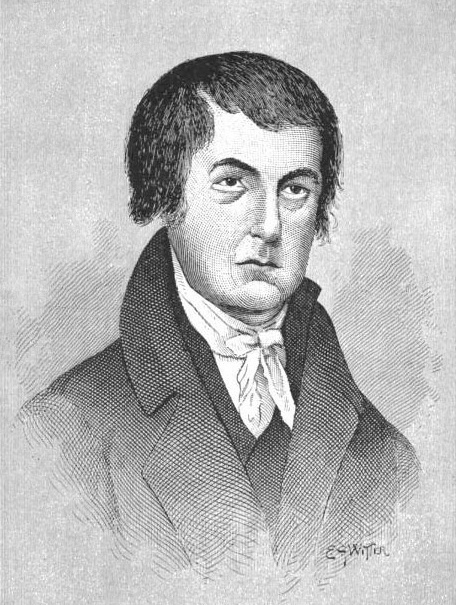

United States Senator from Kentucky
- In office March 4, 1795 – March 3, 1801
- Preceded by: John Edwards
- Succeeded by: John Breckinridge

Member of the Kentucky House of Representatives
- In office 1823–1824
- In office 1807–1809
- In office 1793–1794

Personal details
- Born: 1760 Orlean, Virginia
- Died: July 3, 1841 (aged 80–81) Lexington, Kentucky
- Resting place: Glen Willis
- Party: Federalist
- Spouse: Anna Maria ("Mary") Marshall
- Relations: Nephew of Thomas Marshall (U.S. politician); Cousin and brother-in-law of John Marshall, Louis Marshall, and James Markham Marshall; Brother-in-law of Joseph Hamilton Daveiss; Grandfather of Humphrey Marshall
- Children: Three children, including Thomas Alexander Marshall
- Occupation: Surveyor
- Profession: Lawyer

Military service
- Allegiance: United States
- Branch/service: Virginia militia
- Years of service: 1778–1782
- Rank: Captain lieutenant
- Unit: Virginia State Regiment of Artillery
- Battles/wars: Revolutionary War

Humphrey Marshall (1760 – July 3, 1841) was a politician from the U.S. states of Virginia and Kentucky. He served in the state legislatures of both states and represented Kentucky in the United States Senate from 1795 to 1801. He was a member of the Marshall political family which included his cousins Chief Justice of the United States John Marshall, federal judge James Markham Marshall, and noted educator Louis Marshall. All the prominent members of this family were Federalists. Marshall was also the father of Congressman Thomas Alexander Marshall and the grandfather of Congressman and Confederate General Humphrey Marshall.

During the Revolutionary War, Marshall served with the Virginia State Regiment of Artillery. After the war, he moved to the Kentucky District of Virginia where he became extremely wealthy as a farmer and surveyor. He was a delegate to two of the ten Kentucky statehood conventions and was one of only three delegates from the Kentucky District to vote in favor of ratifying the U.S. Constitution at the 1788 Virginia Ratifying Convention. After Kentucky gained statehood in 1792, Marshall was elected to the state legislature despite the fact that he was a Federalist and zealously antireligious – both of which made him unpopular with many Kentuckians. The Federalist cause received a slight boost when federal forces were successful in quashing the Whiskey Rebellion and ending the Indian threat at the Battle of Fallen Timbers. As a result, the General Assembly elected Marshall to the U.S. Senate in 1794. As a senator, Marshall clung to Federalist principles, supporting the Alien and Sedition Acts and voting to ratify the Jay Treaty. For the latter action, his constituents stoned him and tried to throw him in the Kentucky River. In 1801, he was defeated for reelection by John Breckinridge. He would once again be elected to the state legislature in 1807, 1808, and 1823. During the 1809 legislative session, a disagreement between him and Henry Clay led to a duel between the two men in which both were slightly wounded.

As early as 1786, Marshall had been implicating several prominent Kentucky politicians in a scheme to take Kentucky out of the Union and into alliance with Spain. After the expiration of his Senate term, he resumed these charges through the pages of the Western World newspaper. His allegations resulted in a legislative investigation of Kentucky Court of Appeals judge Benjamin Sebastian, who was found to be receiving a pension from Spain and resigned from the bench. Federal judge Harry Innes was also a target of Marshall's allegations, and the two became embroiled in a legal battle that lasted almost a decade. Innes hired William Littell to write and publish a book giving Innes' version of his dealings with Spain. Marshall countered by publishing his History of Kentucky in 1812. Although blatantly partisan, it became the most widely read history of the state at the time. Marshall and Innes ended their legal battle with an agreement, signed in 1815, that neither would publish anything negative about the other again. Innes upheld his part of the agreement, but in 1824, years after Innes' death, Marshall published an updated edition of his History of Kentucky which was just as vitriolic as the previous version had been. Marshall faded from public life during his later years. He died at the home of his son in Lexington, Kentucky on July 3, 1841.

== Early life ==
Humphrey Marshall was born in Orlean, Virginia in 1760. He was the son of John and Mary (Quisenberry) Marshall and apparently named in honor of his maternal grandfather, Humphrey Quisenberry. Marshall's father was a man of meager means despite being a member of a prominent Virginia family. Little is known of Marshall's early years, but one tradition holds that he had no formal education during his childhood and that his cousin Mary (later, his wife) taught him to read. Eventually, John sent Humphrey to live with his brother, Thomas Marshall, and to be educated by the same Scottish tutors that educated Thomas' children. Among Thomas' children (Humphrey's cousins) were John Marshall, future Chief Justice of the United States; James Markham Marshall, future federal judge; and Louis Marshall, a noted educator. In addition, one of Thomas' daughters, Nancy Marshall, married Joseph Hamilton Daveiss, a future U.S. Attorney. After receiving his education, Marshall became a surveyor.

On January 4, 1778, Marshall enlisted as a cadet for a three-year term in the Virginia State Regiment of Artillery for service in the Revolutionary War. The unit was under the command of his uncle Thomas, who held the rank of colonel. Marshall was assigned to the company of Captain Elisha Edwards. Most of his service records have been lost, but according to his pension application, he held the rank of third lieutenant later in 1778, first lieutenant in 1779, and on December 18, 1789, he was promoted to the rank of captain lieutenant. When the three-year commitment of Marshall and his fellow soldiers expired, their unit was disbanded; on February 6, 1781, Marshall was designated a supernumerary officer. He ended his military service in 1782, and was rewarded with 4,000 acres (1,600 ha) of land on the western frontier.

In 1782, Marshall moved to present-day Kentucky and became deputy surveyor of Fayette County, again serving under his uncle Thomas. Settling in Lexington, he purchased a lot in 1783. On September 18, 1784, he married his cousin, Anna Maria ("Mary") Marshall, Thomas' daughter, . The couple had two sons, Thomas Alexander Marshall, who became a US Congressman; and John Jay Marshall, father of Congressman and Confederate general Humphrey Marshall. They also had a daughter who was killed in infancy by lightning.

Shortly after the creation of Woodford County, Marshall moved within its borders and was appointed county surveyor by Virginia Governor Beverley Randolph. In this capacity, he surveyed and claimed significant additional tracts of land, becoming one of Kentucky's most wealthy citizens. According to tradition, Marshall was known to boast that he could ride from Frankfort to Versailles, a distance of some 20 miles (32 km), and never enter a tract of land that he didn't own. He was also supposed to have boasted that he measured his silver coinage by the peck, not having time to count the individual coins.

Marshall did not believe in rule by the masses, frequently expressing his disdain for the common people. His sharp wit and lack of tact in writing did little to endear him to his neighbors. Like most of the members of his family, he subscribed to Federalist principles, although the majority of Kentuckians were affiliated with the Democratic-Republicans. He was also ostracized by many of his neighbors for being zealously antireligious. He wrote pamphlets denouncing religion of all kinds and published them at his own expense. His later descendants were so embarrassed of his anti-religious writings that they had his personal papers burned.

== Early political career ==
A 1788 letter in the Kentucky Gazette indicated that Marshall had unsuccessfully sought election to the Virginia General Assembly, although the year of the contest is not given. The letter continued that the defeat convinced Marshall that he could not win elected office in Fayette County and that he subsequently lobbied for the creation of Bourbon County, hoping that he might gain an office in that new county. When the county was created in 1785, he immediately applied to become the county lieutenant, but that office had apparently already been promised to someone else. Marshall applied for appointment as deputy lieutenant, and received the appointment.

Although it is not known when Marshall began studying law, nor who his tutor was, he was practicing as early as 1785. In that year, he discovered a flaw in the original 1774 survey of the town of Frankfort. Due to the flaw, several choice acres of land in the northern part of Frankfort remained unclaimed, and Marshall quickly entered claims for them at the land office. Marshall also gained membership in the Kentucky Society for Promoting Useful Knowledge, a Danville-based society dedicated to disseminating information to farmers, mechanics, and other common citizens. He apparently was not accepted for membership in the Danville Political Club, although some sources report that he was accepted as a member after initially being rejected.

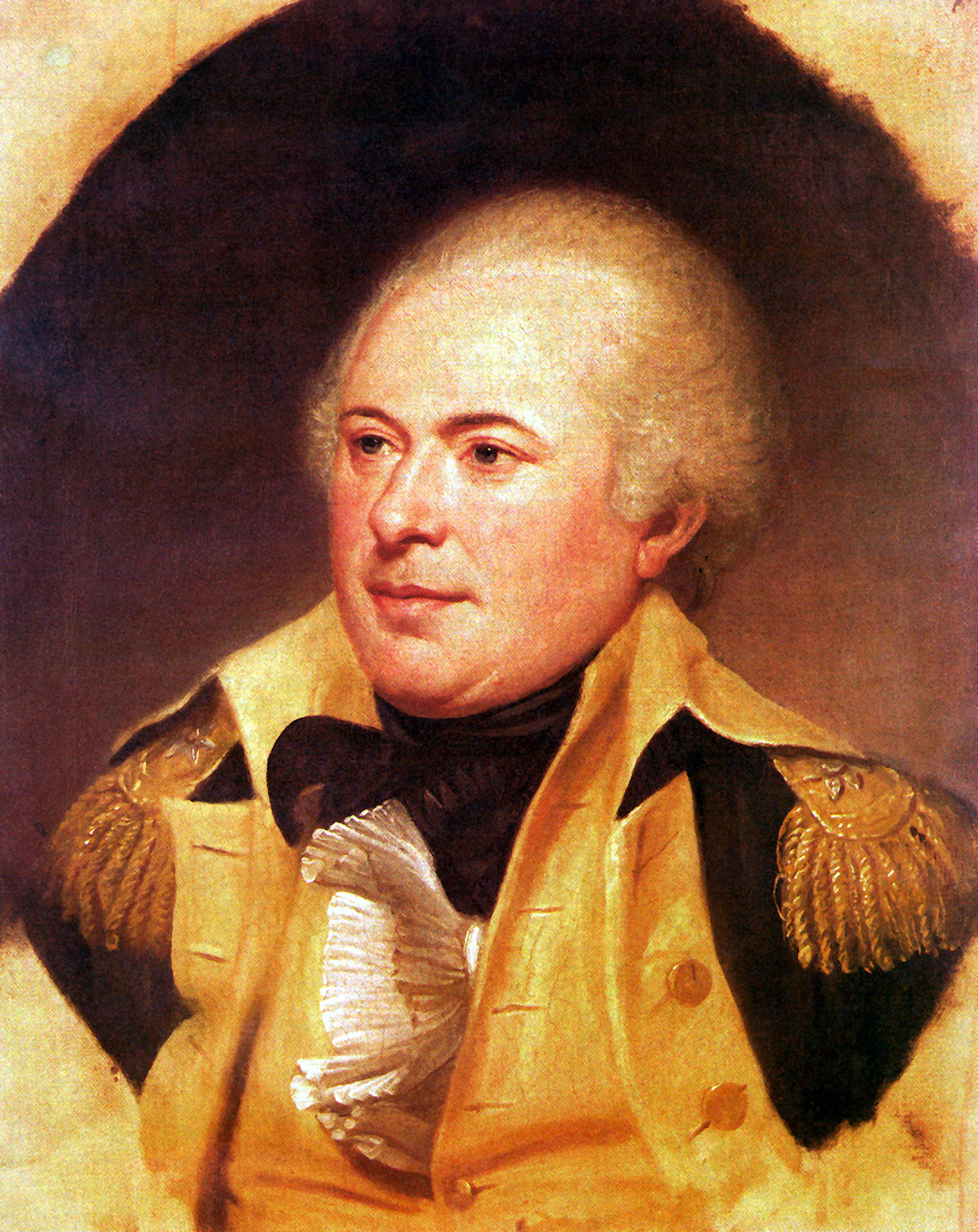
James Wilkinson, accused by Marshall of conspiring with Spain

Around 1786, Marshall gained public attention by expressing his suspicions about James Wilkinson's negotiations with Spain for free use of the Mississippi River and the possibility of Kentucky's secession from the United States to affiliate with Spanish possessions. For the remainder of his life, he vigorously opposed Wilkinson and anyone else he suspected of being involved with the Spanish Conspiracy.

Marshall was a delegate to a 1787 convention in Danville to consider separating Kentucky from Virginia. There were, at that time, two primary positions with regard to the question of separation. The first favored an immediate separation with or without Virginia's consent, while the other favored waiting for legal approval from Virginia and the U.S. Congress. Marshall was among the latter group, and his uncle Thomas was the primary spokesman for this position. Biographer Anderson Chenault Quisenberry notes, "As to Humphrey Marshall's prominence in the Danville convention, or as to what notable part he acted there, nothing is said by the historians."

In 1788, Marshall announced his candidacy to be a delegate to the Virginia Ratifying Convention. The proposed constitution was very unpopular in all parts of Kentucky except Jefferson County, but Marshall openly favored its ratification. Hoping to wreck Marshall's candidacy, a man named Jordan Harris charged that Marshall had, in a letter to John Crittenden, Sr., acknowledged himself to be a liar. In the pages of the Kentucky Gazette, Marshall called on Harris to publish the letter. Harris was so insulted by Marshall's demand that he threatened to cane him. At their next meeting, Harris fired two pistols at Marshall. Neither shot injured Marshall, who retaliated by beating Harris with a stick severely enough to force his retreat from the encounter.

Despite his favorable position toward the proposed federal constitution, Marshall was chosen as a delegate to the convention from Fayette County. On June 25, 1788, he joined Jefferson County delegates Robert Breckinridge and Rice Bullock in voting for ratification. Ten other Kentucky delegates opposed ratification and one abstained. The final convention vote was 89–79 in favor of ratification. It was reported that even the Jefferson County delegates were beginning to waver in their commitment to the proposed constitution, but that Marshall steeled their resolve and also influenced several delegates from other parts of Virginia to favor it.

In 1789 Marshall was elected again to a convention to consider separation from Virginia. After Kentucky's separation from Virginia in 1792, he was elected to represent Woodford County in the Kentucky House of Representatives. The most notable piece of legislation he authored was an act that simplified the classification and taxation of land. He was reelected to his position in 1794. He opposed allocating men or supplies for George Rogers Clark's proposed attack upon the Spanish at New Orleans. The attack was promoted by Edmond-Charles Genêt, and Marshall accused sitting governor Isaac Shelby of complicity in the matter.

== U.S. Senate ==
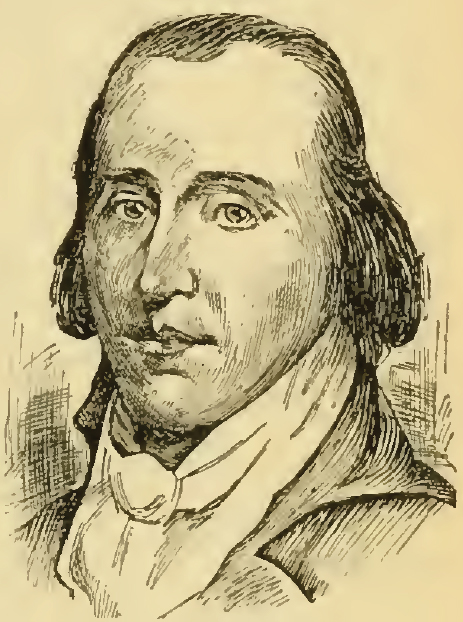
John Breckinridge, Marshall's opponent for the U.S. Senate

Partly as a result of Marshall's attacks on prominent Democratic-Republicans such as Governor Shelby, the Federalists gained influence in the state legislature. The Federalist cause was also bolstered by the quashing of the Whiskey Rebellion by federal forces in 1794, and the federal victory over the Northwest Indians at the Battle of Fallen Timbers on August 20, 1794. Later that year, the Federalists in the General Assembly nominated Marshall for the United States Senate. On the first ballot, Marshall garnered 18 votes, compared with 16 for Democratic-Republican John Breckinridge, 8 for John Fowler, and 7 for incumbent John Edwards. On the runoff ballot that followed, Marshall defeated Breckinridge by a vote of 28–22.

Shortly after Marshall departed for Philadelphia, the temporary national capital, George Muter and Benjamin Sebastian, both justices of the Kentucky Court of Appeals, published a pamphlet stating that Marshall had perjured himself in a Court of Appeals case between himself and James Wilkinson. No known copies of the pamphlet are extant, and related surviving documents do not relate the exact nature of the charges. Marshall, being out of the state, was unable to reply immediately to the charges, and his enemies in the General Assembly drafted a memorial to the U.S. Senate requesting an investigation of the charges. On December 16, 1795, the memorial was approved by the General Assembly and transmitted to the Senate. The Senate appointed a committee to recommend action on the memorial, and the committee found that the charges against Marshall were not specific, that the authors had provided no evidence upon which to evaluate the charges, that no one was empowered to prosecute the charges in the Senate, and that further action by the Senate was inappropriate. On March 22, 1796, the Senate approved the committee's report by a vote of 16–8. Muter and Sebastian never filed formal charges against Marshall for perjury.

Although Marshall was not frequently active in debate on the Senate floor, he was a strong advocate of nearly every Federalist measure considered in that body. Many of these were unpopular in Kentucky, including the Alien and Sedition Acts. Marshall's vote in favor of the Jay Treaty was particularly unpopular with his constituents, and when he returned home after the vote, a mob of angry citizens in Frankfort stoned him. Next, the mob tried to throw Marshall into the Kentucky River. Marshall appealed to the Baptists in the crowd, declaring, "Now allow me to say that according to Baptist rules, it is irregular to administer baptism before the receiver gives his experience. If you are determined to proceed, let the exercise be performed in decent order. Let me give my experience first." The thought of hearing a religious testimony from Marshall, a noted atheist, so humored the mob that it disbanded in a fit of laughter, and Marshall escaped. In the subsequent senatorial election, however, Breckinridge defeated Marshall for his seat.

== Later political career ==
After the expiration of his Senate term in 1801, Marshall returned to his farm and his law practice, seldom acting in the realm of public affairs. In 1806, however, he resumed his attacks on suspected participants in the Spanish Conspiracy. His articles in the newly founded Frankfort Western World newspaper – written under the pseudonym "Observer" – prompted the Kentucky House of Representatives to form a select committee to investigate his charges. The committee found that Benjamin Sebastian had received a pension of $2,000 a year from Spain in return for his involvement in the Conspiracy. Federal judge Harry Innes, a frequent object of Marshall's suspicions, testified against Sebastian before the committee. Sebastian resigned his position on the Court, and the House declined to pursue further action against him. Marshall also unsuccessfully lobbied through his brother-in-law, U.S. Attorney Joseph Hamilton Daveiss, for a grand jury to indict Aaron Burr for attempting to enlist Kentuckians to participate in the Burr conspiracy. Marshall's intensified attacks on Judge Harry Innes in the pages of the Western World became so severe that they prompted Innes to sue both Marshall and Western World co-founder Joseph M. Street for libel. Both cases dragged on for several years in the courts.

Buoyed by his involvement in the exposure of Benjamin Sebastian, Marshall declared his candidacy for a seat in the Kentucky House in 1807. Friends of Innes and others implicated by Marshall in the Spanish Conspiracy recruited Nathaniel Richardson, a lawyer turned farmer, to oppose Marshall. Approximately 1,100 votes were cast, and Marshall was elected by a majority of 11 votes. Marshall's biographer records that "the records of Humphrey Marshall's services in the Legislature at this time are scanty, the journals of the session being not in existence, as it is believed; or, at any rate, extremely rare." He is believed to have introduced a measure that reduced the limitation on ejectments from twenty years to seven.

=== Duel with Henry Clay ===
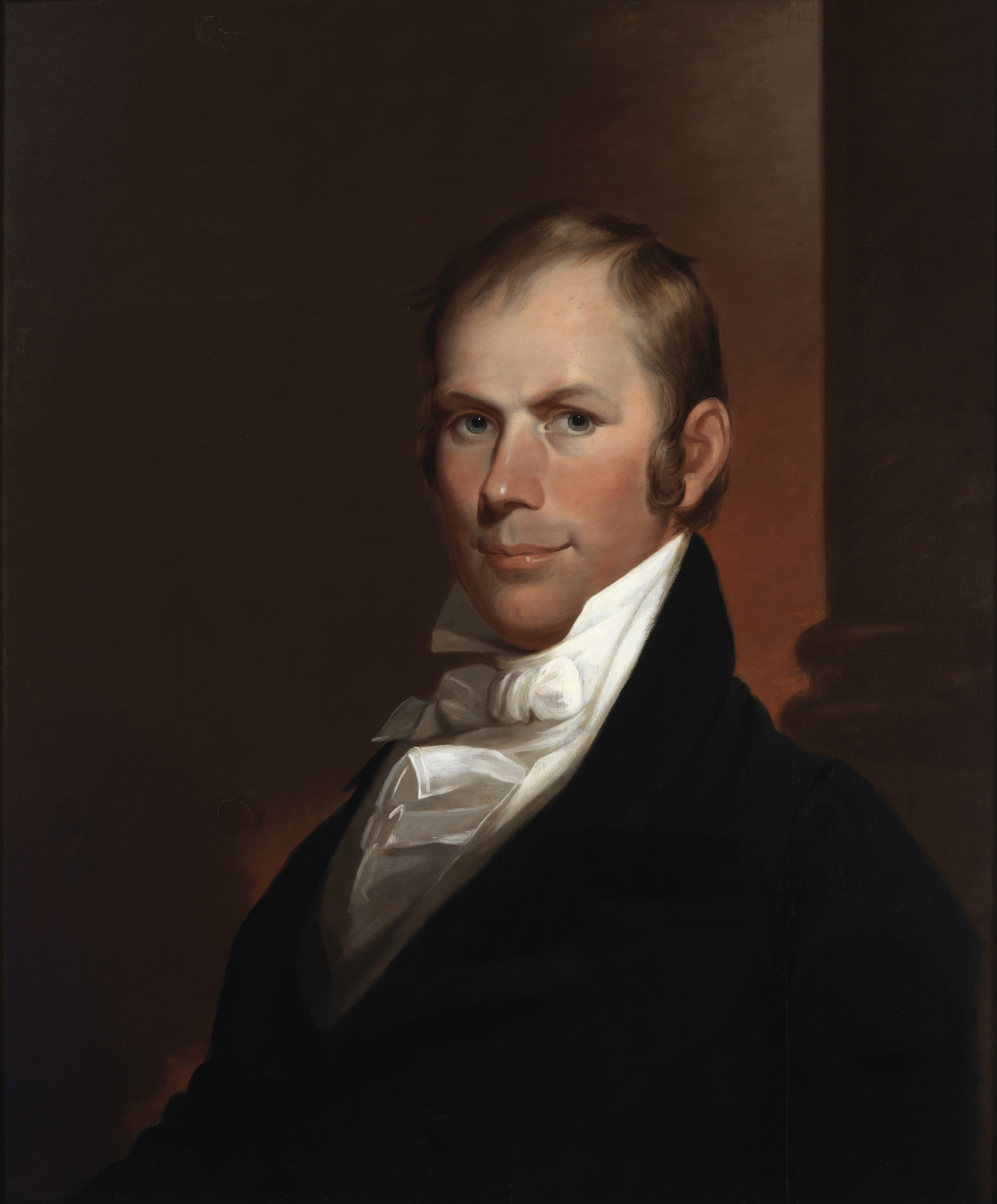
Henry Clay fought a duel with Marshall on January 19, 1809.

Marshall sought reelection in 1808 and defeated his opponent, John M. Scott, by a majority of 11 votes, identical to his margin the previous year. Expectations of a confrontation between Marshall and fellow representative Henry Clay were high during the session, owing to tensions between the two dating back to Clay's defense of Aaron Burr during the Burr conspiracy. George D. Prentice, in his biography of Clay, records that some of Clay's allies in the House refused to vote for him for Speaker of the House so that Clay would remain on the chamber floor, from whence he was better able to counter Marshall. Clay's chair in the chamber was separated from Marshall's only by that of General Christopher Riffe, the representative from Lincoln County, who was described as "a burly German of almost gigantic size and herculean strength".

A few minor quarrels passed between Marshall and Clay early in the session, but the relative peace dissolved in December 1808 when Clay introduced a resolution calling for all members of the General Assembly to wear "homespun" garments as a means of encouraging local manufacturing and reducing British imports. Although Clay typically wore finer garments than Marshall, for the duration of the debate on his motion, Clay wore simple homemade clothes. Marshall regarded the measure as demagoguery and employed a tailor to make him a suit of British broadcloth to wear on the House floor. The two men exchanged insults on the House floor and would have commenced a physical altercation if not for Riffe's intervention. Instead, on January 4, 1809, Clay challenged Marshall to a duel, which he quickly accepted.

The duel took place in Indiana on January 19, 1809, just across the Ohio River from Shippingport, Kentucky. Joseph Hamilton Daveiss provided the pistols. On the first shot, Marshall missed and Clay lightly grazed Marshall's stomach. Marshall missed again on the second shot, and Clay's pistol misfired. Marshall's third shot lightly wounded Clay in the thigh, while Clay missed Marshall entirely. Clay insisted that the two each take another shot, but Marshall declined on grounds that Clay's injury put him on unequal footing with his adversary, and the matter was ended.

=== Expulsion from and reelection to the House ===
Tensions between Marshall and Innes continued during Marshall's tenure in the legislature. When Innes, acting on a recommendation from an advisory jury, dismissed an unrelated fraud case brought by Marshall in Innes' district court, Marshall retaliated by convincing Congressman John Rowan to file an impeachment petition against Innes in the House of Representatives. Innes countered by having his son-in-law, Thomas Bodley, pursue a censure of Marshall in the state House. Rowan's petition against Innes failed, but Bodley's against Marshall succeeded, and Marshall was expelled from the House in 1808, only to be re-elected the following year.

Marshall sought reelection in 1810, but was defeated by George Adams by a margin of 76 votes. From 1812 to 1813, he served on the board of trustees for the city of Frankfort. He made another unsuccessful run for the Kentucky House of Representatives in 1813, losing to John Arnold.

After a long absence from politics, Marshall was called to one final act of public service. Upon the death of Martin D. Hardin who had been elected to the Kentucky House of Representatives in 1823 but died before he could take office, Marshall pursued an abbreviated campaign for the vacant seat and defeated Jeptha Dudley by a margin of 3 votes. The primary issue of the day was the Old Court – New Court controversy, an attempt by the legislature to abolish the extant Court of Appeals and replace it with a new court in retaliation for overturning a replevin law passed in a previous legislative session. Marshall enjoyed a higher level of support in this election by virtue of his support for the Old Court, which was the prevailing sentiment in his district. His actions in the session, however, appear to have been unremarkable, and he did not seek reelection at the end of his term.

== Later life and death ==
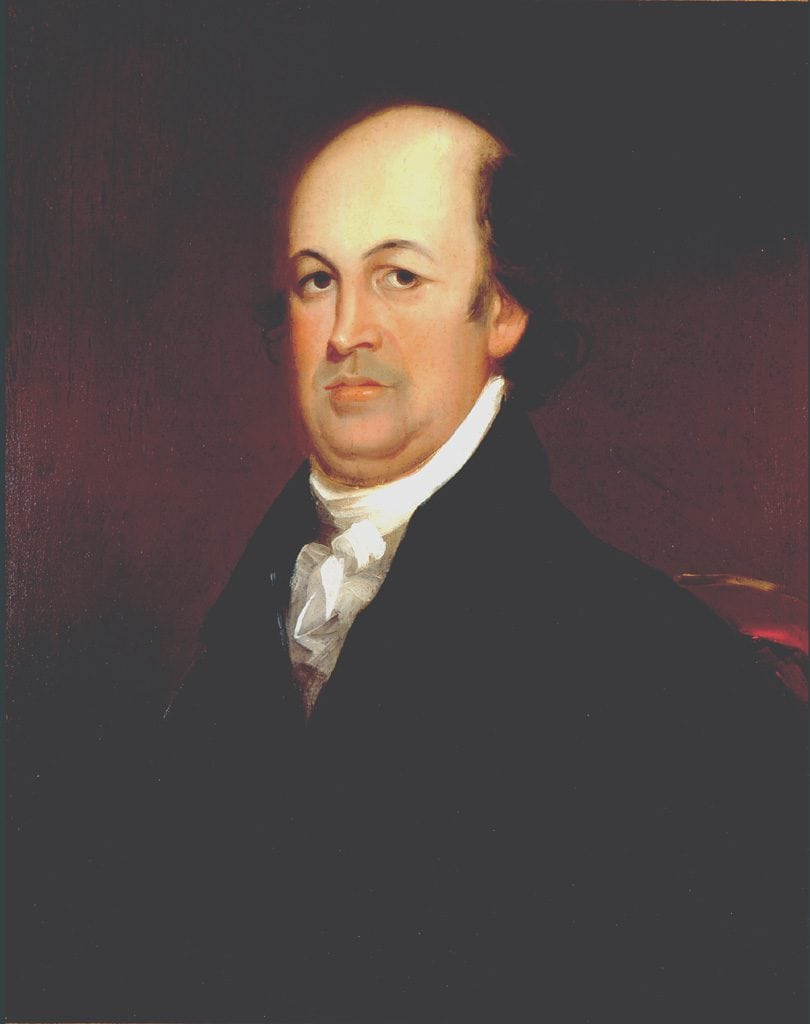
Harry Innes and Marshall engaged in a long legal battle over Innes' alleged role in the Spanish Conspiracy.

After his political career, Marshall became more interested in writing. He frequently contributed content to the state's newspapers and occasionally wrote poetry. He founded the American Republic, the only Federalist newspaper in the state, and published its first issue on June 26, 1810. Newspapers sympathetic to the Democratic-Republicans soon derided the American Republic as "The Snake". Undaunted, Marshall added a rattlesnake and the inscription "Tread Not On Me. For My Country." to the paper's masthead. Marshall soon changed the name of the paper to the Harbinger, and eventually sold it to Patrick Darby in 1825. Darby immediately changed the name of the newspaper again, dubbing it the Constitutional Advocate.

=== Resolution of legal disputes ===
Harry Innes' libel suit against Joseph Street was not fully adjudicated in the Jessamine County Circuit Court until 1811. The jury found in Innes' favor and awarded $750 in damages, although Innes' counsel, Henry Clay and Robert Wickliffe, insisted that Innes only desired the vindication of a guilty verdict against Street and would not collect the damages. Soon after, Street shuttered the Western World and moved to Illinois.

As the libel suit against Marshall dragged on in Mercer County Circuit Court, Innes and his allies hired author William Littell to publish Innes' version of his interactions with Spain. Marshall countered by publishing his History of Kentucky in 1812. Although blatantly partisan, it became the most popular history of Kentucky at the time. When Street returned to Kentucky to give a deposition in the case in 1814, Innes swore out a writ against him to collect the damages awarded in his case against Street. Unable to pay, Street was imprisoned.

Innes' case against Marshall ended in a hung jury in 1814. Rather than retry the case, Marshall and Innes signed an agreement to end the legal battle in 1815. The agreement stipulated that neither man would write or publish anything that was disrespectful of the other. Innes upheld his part of the agreement, but in 1824, eight years after Innes' death, Marshall published an updated two-volume version of his History of Kentucky that was even more critical of Innes and others he suspected of participating in the Spanish Conspiracy.

=== Death ===
Marshall retired from public life altogether after selling the Harbinger in 1825. His wife had died the previous year, and soon after selling his newspaper, he became paralyzed by a palsy on one side. Thus disabled, he soon moved to Lexington to live with his son, Thomas, then a professor at Transylvania University. He died at his son's home on July 3, 1841. A slaveholder for his entire life, Marshall's will dictated that all of his slaves be emancipated upon his death. He was buried at Glen Willis, his estate in Leestown, Kentucky. No marker was erected above his grave. In 1888, the General Assembly allocated $300 to rebury Marshall's remains in Frankfort Cemetery and place a marker above the grave, but his family members asked that his remains be undisturbed.

U.S. Senate
Preceded by John Edwards	U.S. senator (Class 3) from Kentucky; 1795–1801; Served alongside: John Brown	Succeeded by John Breckinridge
