= Senator Breckinridge =

Senator Breckinridge may refer to:

- John C. Breckinridge (1821–1875), U.S. Senator from Kentucky in 1861
- John Breckinridge (U.S. Attorney General) (1760–1806), U.S. Senator from Kentucky from 1801 to 1805
