= Middleburg, Kentucky =

Middleburg
- Unincorporated community
- Location within the state of Kentucky Middleburg (the United States)
- Coordinates: 37°21′28″N 84°49′16″W
- Country: United States
- State: Kentucky
- County: Casey
- Elevation: 860 ft (260 m)
- Time zone: UTC-5 (Eastern (EST))
  - Summer (DST): UTC-4 (EST)
- ZIP codes: 42541
- GNIS feature ID: 498151

Middleburg is a rural unincorporated community with a post office sitting just off the Green River in central Casey County, Kentucky, United States. The first land owner in the area was Abraham Lincoln I, the grandfather of president Abraham Lincoln, who purchased 800 acres (3.2 km^{2}) in the area in 1784. In 1800, Lincoln transferred the land to Christopher Riffe.

Riffe built a home there and operated a mill, which began the focal point of the community. He was also the community's first postmaster when the post office first opened on February 11, 1837. He may have named it for Middleburg, Virginia; another theory cites its location "midway between Liberty and Hustonville" but the road connecting those two places does not go through Middleburg. Another possibiity is that the place got its name from being near the "middle" of Kentucky; it sits at the southern apex of a triangle formed by the geographic center of Kentucky, three miles north-northwest of Lebanon, and the place in Kentucky farthest from any other state, Buckeye in Garrard County.
