= Fielding Bradford House =

Historic house in Kentucky, United States

- U.S. National Register of Historic Places
- Location within Kentucky Location within the United States
- Coordinates: 38°14′42″N 84°34′46″W
- NRHP reference No.: 73000831
- Added to NRHP: December 4, 1973

The Fielding Bradford House is an historic house built on a tract of land near North Elkhorn and Cane Run Creeks in Scott County, Kentucky. The house was originally owned by Fielding Bradford and is an example of an early Kentucky weatherboarded log house. The property was added to the U.S. National Register of Historic Places on December 4, 1973.

Fielding Bradford was the brother of printer and early Kentucky settler John Bradford. He left working on the Kentucky Gazette in the spring of 1788 when he married Eleanor Smith Barbee and moved to Scott County where he became a political and military leader. He served in the Kentucky General Assembly as a State Representative in 1802, 1803, 1808, 1809 and 1811. During the War of 1812 he was quartermaster for George Trotter's Regiment of Kentucky Mounted Militia. He was also a county court judge.
