= Benjamin Howard (Missouri politician) =

First governor of Missouri Territory (1760–1814)

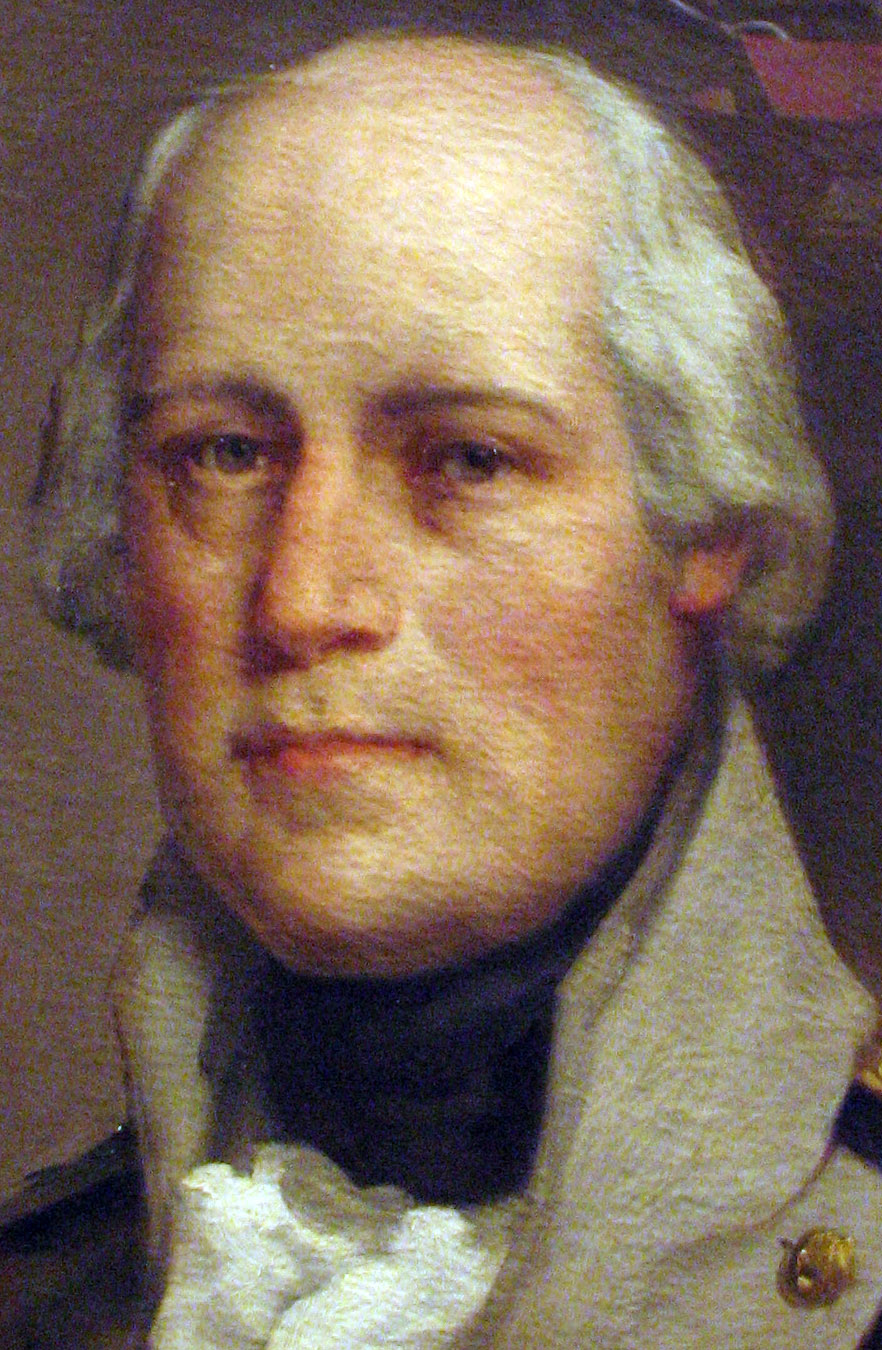

3rd Governor of Missouri Territory
- In office October 11, 1809 – July 1, 1813
- Preceded by: Meriwether Lewis
- Succeeded by: William Clark

Member of the U.S. House of Representatives from Kentucky's 5th district
- In office March 4, 1807 – April 10, 1810
- Preceded by: John Fowler
- Succeeded by: William T. Barry

Personal details
- Born: 1760 Lexington, Colony of Virginia, (modern-day Lexington, Kentucky) British America
- Died: September 18, 1814 (aged 53–54) St. Louis, Missouri, U.S.
- Party: Democratic-Republican
- Education: College of William & Mary

Benjamin Howard (1760 – September 18, 1814) was a United States representative (congressman), serving in the United States House of Representatives, the lower chamber of the bicameral Congress of the United States, from Kentucky, the first governor serving 1809-1813 of the new federal Missouri Territory (1812–1821), with its capital city established at St. Louis, the prosperous wealthy river port town on the west bank of the Mississippi River, and a brigadier general of the United States Army in the War of 1812 (1812–1815).

== Early life and education ==
Howard was born in Lexington, Kentucky, (then part of Virginia) and graduated in 1797 from the College of William & Mary.

== Career ==
=== Election to Kentucky General Assembly ===
Howard was elected to the Kentucky General Assembly in 1800. Continuing in politics, he was elected to the 10th and 11th Congresses (D-R-KY), from 1807 until April 10, 1810. One week later, on April 17, 1810, President James Madison appointed him as governor of the Louisiana Territory (the Louisiana Purchase district north of modern-day Louisiana). It was renamed the Missouri Territory in June 1812.

=== War of 1812 ===
During the War of 1812, Howard resigned his post and was commissioned as a brigadier general of the Eighth Military Department. In September 1813, Brigadier General Benjamin Howard led an expedition of about 1,400 men against Indian villages around Lake Pimiteoui. The first portion of the expedition, a detachment of 150 troops of the First United States Infantry under the command of Lt. Colonel Robert Carter Nicholas, arrived at Lake Pimiteoui on August 29. The troops came from St. Louis in reinforced keel boats and immediately began to build a stockade adjacent to the river at the former French village. Trees were cut on the eastern shore of the lake and rafted across to the western shore.

While the first blockhouse was under construction, 150 Indians under the command of Black Partridge made an attack on the troops, but were driven off. Eight hundred mounted rangers from the Illinois and Missouri militia reached the settlement three days after the arrival of the regulars. The rangers marched to the two Indian villages at the head of Lake Pimiteoui; on the eastern shore was the village of Black Partridge, and on the western shore was a Potawatomi village, led by Chief Gomo. When the rangers arrived, the occupants of both villages had already fled. The rangers burned what remained of the villages and returned to the French village. With over 1,000 men to assist, the construction of a new fort was completed on September 23. A brass six-pound cannon was mounted and fired in celebration. The fort was named Fort Clark, in honor of General George Rogers Clark.

Howard sent a force in two boats under Major William Christy to pursue the Indians on the upper Illinois River. Another force, under Major Nathan Boone, followed the course of the Spoon River for 50 miles. Upon their return to Fort Clark, both officers reported that their troops were unable to overtake the fleeing Indians. The rangers were relieved of duty at Fort Clark in mid-October and returned to their home stations, leaving the regulars to garrison the post.

=== Death ===
Howard fell ill while returning to St. Louis and died in the city. His original burial location is unknown, although probably somewhere in downtown St. Louis. Some time between 1817 and 1844, his remains were reinterred at the Old Grace Church Graveyard just north of downtown St. Louis (11th and Warren streets). He was reportedly transferred to Bellefontaine Cemetery some time after 1851, but the cemetery has no record of his interment. The true location of his body is unknown.

== Legacy ==
Fort Howard in Green Bay, Wisconsin, was named after him in 1816. He is also the namesake of Howard County, Missouri.

Benjamin Howard was the son of John Howard and the grandson of Allen Howard, born in 1685, was an elected justice to Albemarle county, Virginia. Benjamin's father, uncles and grandfathers fought as Patriots in the Revolutionary War. West Cote and Howardsville, Virginia, were founded by his grandfather Allen Howard. Benjamin Howard was born in Virginia and moved to Kentucky and then Missouri, his father followed.
