= Danville Political Club =

Debating society in Danville, Kentucky

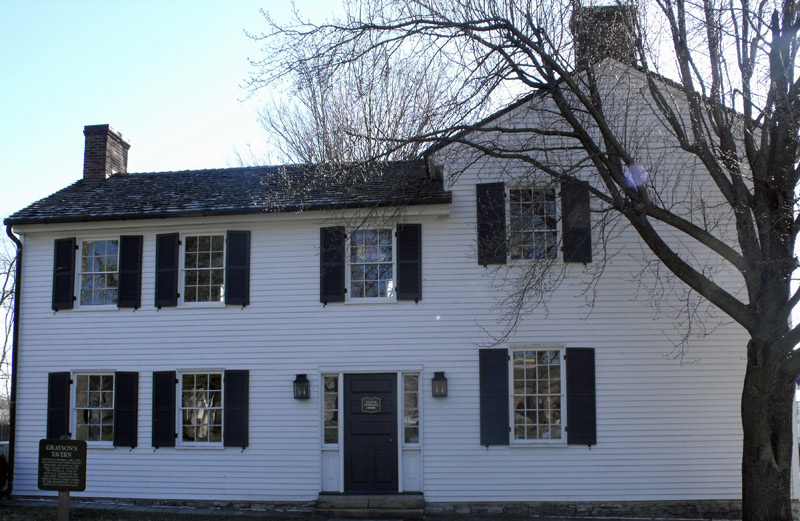
A replica of Grayson's Tavern, the meeting place of the Danville Political Club

The Danville Political Club was a debating society based in Danville, Kentucky from 1786 to 1790.

== Discovery ==
There are very few extant contemporary references to the Political Club. A U.S. army paymaster by the name of Major Beatty wrote in his journal that, while staying in Danville, he and his companions were "very much disturbed by a Political Club which met in the next house where we slept and kept us awake till 12 or 1 o'clock." Also, two letters mentioning the club were written from Peter Tardeveau, a member of the club, to two other members. Beyond this, no references to the club have been found. Whether the club was meant to be kept secret or the lack of references to it was purely accidental is not known.

The existence of the club may never have been known if not for the discovery made by Thomas Speed II in 1878. Speed, the grandson of the club's secretary Thomas Speed, discovered a bundle of papers labeled "Political Club papers" while cleaning out his grandfather's desk. The elder Thomas Speed had kept meticulous notes of the club's activities throughout its existence, though some were scribbled on bits of newspapers and old letters. Speed's grandson published the documents through The Filson Historical Society in 1894.

== Membership ==
According to the club's first constitution, new members of the club had to be elected unanimously. Later, the requirement was lowered to a two-thirds majority.

Thirty men belonged to the club at one time or another, though no more than fifteen were ever present at any given meeting. A list of these members follows, with founding members listed in italics:

- Thomas Allin
- Joshua Barbee
- John Belli
- James Brown
- John Brown
- Abraham Buford
- Robert Craddock
- Robert Dougherty
- Baker Ewing
- Willis Green
- Christopher Greenup
- Harry Innes
- Gabriel Jones Johnson
- William Kennedy
- William McClung
- Samuel McDowell
- William McDowell
- George Muter
- James Nourse
- Stephen Ormsby
- James Overton
- John Overton Jr.
- Benjamin Sebastian
- Peyton Short
- James Speed
- Thomas Speed
- Peter Tardeveau
- Thomas Todd
- David Walker
- Matthew Walton

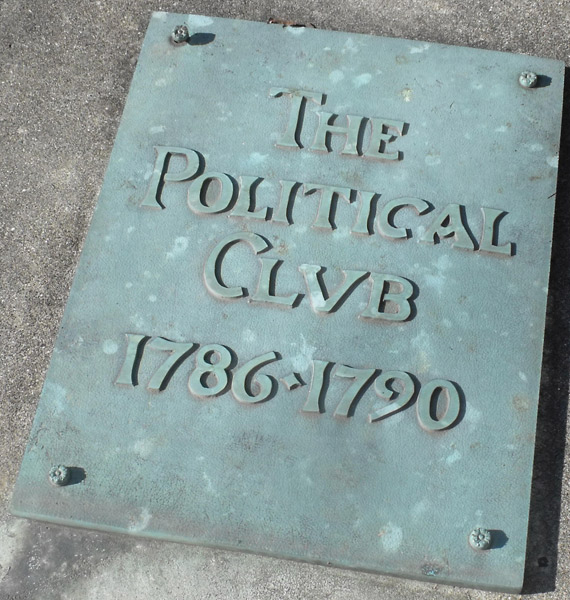
A plaque commemorating the meetings of the Danville Political Club is fixed near the replica of Grayson's Tavern in Constitution Square State Historic Site.

So prominent were these men in the history of Kentucky that Thomas Speed II opined "Full and complete biographies of some of the members would present a history of Kentucky from the beginning of its settlement past the first quarter of the ensuing century." Eleven different club members participated in at least one of the ten constitutional conventions that helped separate Kentucky from Virginia. Samuel McDowell was president and Todd was secretary of the 1792 convention that produced the first Kentucky Constitution.

The Kentucky Society for the Promotion of Useful Knowledge was closely associated with the Danville Political Club. Fifteen men were members of both organizations, and some believe the Society was an adjunct of the Danville Political Club. Both organizations were active at about the same time and frequently debated the same or similar subjects.

== Meetings ==
The first meeting of the Political Club was at the residence of Samuel McDowell on the night of December 27, 1786. The founding members of the club resolved to invite Muter, Short, Ormsby, Johnson, Tardeveau, Allen, William McDowell, Thomas Speed, and James Overton to join the club. Also at the first meeting, Innes, Greenup, Belli, and John Brown were tasked with drafting a constitution for the club.

While studying at The College of William & Mary, Brown had been a member of the first ever chapter of Phi Beta Kappa, and he borrowed heavily from that organization's constitution. Consequently, by the second meeting, held a week later at the home of Thomas Barbee, Brown was able to present a draft document to the club. After two readings and several amendments, the constitution was approved.

Initially, meetings took place on Saturday nights at Grayson's Tavern in Danville, although fewer than half of the club's members were residents of that city. In May 1787, the club relocated their meetings to the courthouse in Danville and convene at 3:30 PM. Fines were levied against members for being late to meetings, leaving a meeting early, or missing a meeting without an acceptable excuse. (One acceptable excuse was the wooing of a woman, but only if doing so out-of-town.) Six members were considered a quorum, and at each meeting, a president was elected for the duration of that meeting. The club's constitution also called for the election of a secretary and treasurer who would serve until removed or unable to execute their duties. Thomas Speed was chosen as the secretary and Thomas Allin was chosen treasurer at the second meeting.

The topic of debate for each night was selected a month in advance. Some nights, the topic was related to the district of Kentucky's relationship to Virginia; other nights it was national in scope. For several consecutive meetings, the members debated the federal constitution, clause by clause, and suggested amendments. The resulting document was found in Thomas Speed's desk under the title "The Constitution of the United States as Amended and Approved by the Political Club." Perhaps the most remarkable suggestion was offered by George Muter on February 23, 1788: "[T]he Federal Constitution ought to be preceded by a Declaration of Rights!" A committee composed of Innes, Greenup, Belli, Craddock, Todd, and John Brown were charged with drafting such a declaration, but if they carried out this charge, the result has been lost to history.
