= Christopher Riffe =

German-American pioneer and politician in Kentucky

Christopher Riffe (1764-1850) accompanied Col. William Casey (great-grandfather of Mark Twain) to Kentucky in 1784. Riffe lived at Bryan's Station, Boonesborough, Logan's Station and Carpenter's Station. He bought 800 acres (3.2 km^{2}) of land from the grandfather of Abraham Lincoln. Riffe became the first Euro-American settler of Casey County in 1793. He was the first State Representative from Casey County, serving seven terms. He fought in the Battle of the Thames in the Kentucky Sixth Regiment. He was Lieutenant-General of the Kentucky State Militia.

During his time as Lincoln County representative, Riffe, who was described as "a burly German of almost gigantic size and herculean strength", sat between rivals Humphrey Marshall and Henry Clay in the House chamber, and once broke up a fight between the two men.

== Sources ==
- Kentucky Historical Marker No. 250 located at Middleburg Cemetery, Lynn St., Middleburg, Ky
- Quisenberry, Anderson Chenault (1892). The life and times of Hon. Humphrey Marshall. Winchester, Kentucky: Sun Publishing Company.
