= John Brown (Kentucky politician, born 1757) =

American lawyer and statesman, Virginia (1757–1837)

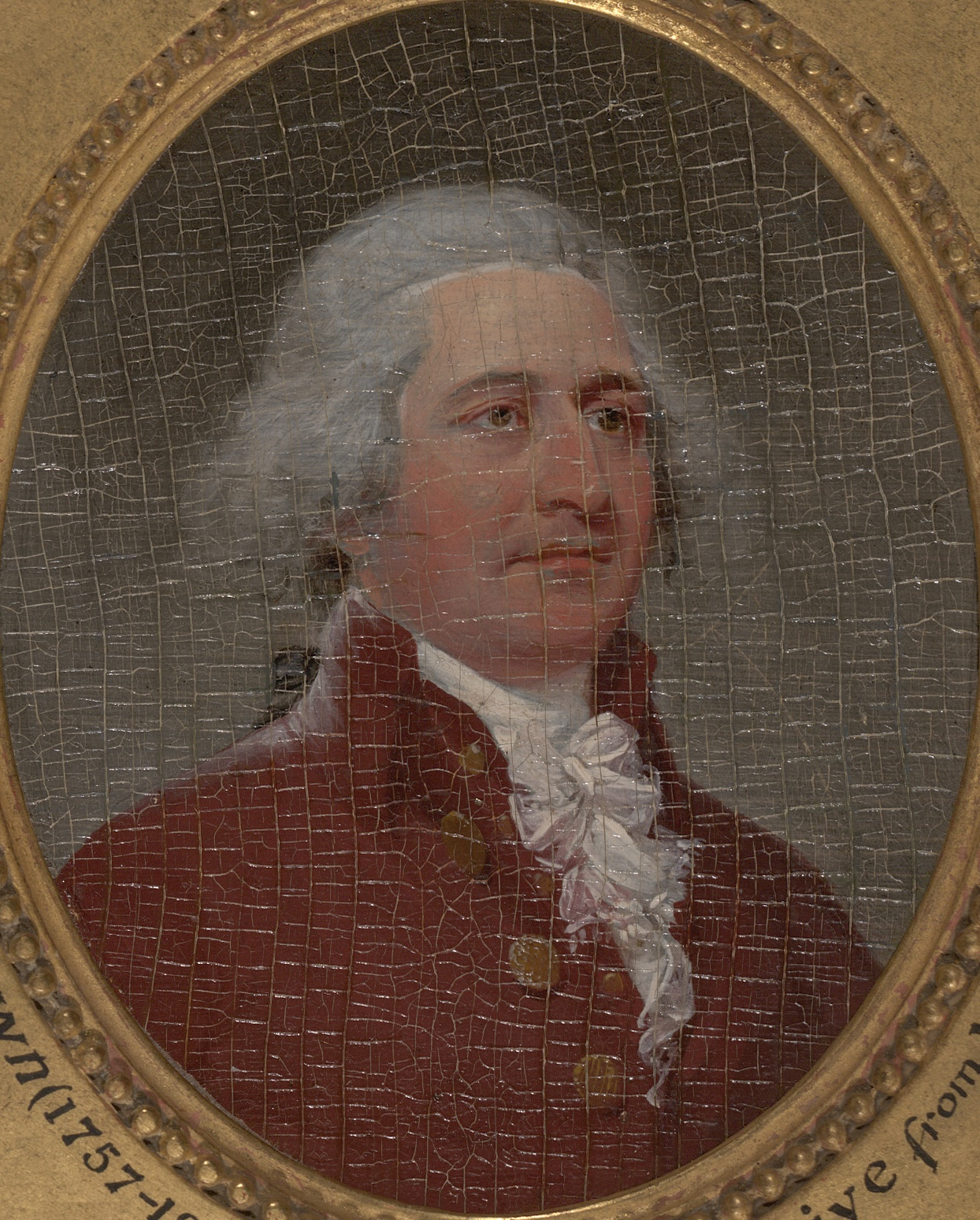
- Portrait miniature by John Trumbull, c. 1792

President pro tempore of the United States Senate
- In office October 16, 1803 – February 26, 1804
- Preceded by: Stephen R. Bradley
- Succeeded by: Jesse Franklin

United States Senator from Kentucky
- In office June 18, 1792 – March 3, 1805
- Preceded by: Position established
- Succeeded by: Buckner Thruston

Member of the U.S. House of Representatives from Virginia's 2nd district
- In office March 4, 1789 – June 1, 1792
- Preceded by: Position established
- Succeeded by: Andrew Moore

Delegate from Virginia to the Congress of the Confederation
- In office November 5, 1787 – October 21, 1788

Member of the Virginia Senate from Botetourt, Washington, Jefferson, Fayette, Lincoln and Greenbrier Counties
- Preceded by: William Christian

Personal details
- Born: September 12, 1757 Augusta County, Virginia Colony, British America
- Died: August 29, 1837 (aged 79) Lexington, Kentucky, U.S.
- Resting place: Frankfort Cemetery
- Party: Democratic-Republican
- Other political affiliations: Anti-Administration
- Spouse: Margaretta Mason
- Children: 5 (including Mason and Orlando)
- Education: Liberty Hall Academy; College of William & Mary; College of New Jersey

John Brown (September 12, 1757 – August 29, 1837) was an American lawyer and statesman who participated in the development and formation of the State of Kentucky after the American Revolutionary War.

Brown represented Virginia in the Continental Congress (1777–1778) and the U.S. Congress (1789–1791). While in Congress, he introduced the bill granting Statehood to Kentucky. Once that was accomplished, he was elected by the new state legislature as a U.S. Senator for Kentucky. From 1803 to 1804, Brown served as President pro tempore of the United States Senate.

== Early life ==
John Brown was born in Augusta County in the Colony of Virginia, on September 12, 1757. He was a son of Reverend John Brown and Margaret Preston Brown, immigrants from northern Ireland. The son of a Presbyterian minister and schoolmaster, John was well educated, first at his father's Liberty Hall Academy (now Washington and Lee University), and then at the College of New Jersey (now Princeton University). His studies at Princeton were halted, temporarily, as a result of the approach of English troops during the American Revolutionary War.

Brown's role during the Revolutionary War is unclear. The family tradition was that Brown served under General George Washington and the Marquis de Lafayette in the Continental Army; however, no known documentation supports this account. Two years after he left the College of New Jersey (1778), Brown enrolled at The College of William & Mary where he studied law. In the fall of 1780, his studies were interrupted by the War and the arrival of the British forces to the city. Brown continued to study law by 'reading it' while working in the office of Thomas Jefferson near Charlottesville, Virginia.

== Family life ==
Brown married Margaretta Mason, daughter of a Presbyterian minister of New York City, on February 21, 1799. They had five children together, only two of whom lived to adulthood:

- Mason Brown (November 10, 1799 – January 27, 1867) was born in Philadelphia.
- Orlando (September 26, 1801 – July 26, 1867) was born at Liberty Hall.
- Alfred was born at Liberty Hall on February 23, 1803, and died on January 29, 1804;
- a second Alfred was born on May 9, 1804, and died on July 30, 1805.
- Euphemia Helen, their youngest child and only daughter, was born on May 24, 1807. She died of a calomiel overdose on October 1, 1814.

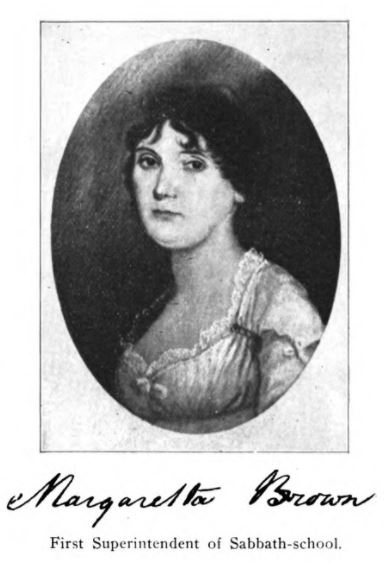
Margaretta Mason Brown (1772-1838), First Superintendent of Sabbath School in Frankfort, Kentucky

In 1810 Margaretta Brown and other women took over the teaching of the first Sunday School west of the Alleghenies (the first was established in Pittsburgh a year before) - this was for boys only. In 1816, the Browns helped found Frankfort's First Presbyterian Church; and, three years later, Margaretta Brown became the first superintendent of a Sabbath school for girls. In 1824, Margaretta Brown published Food for Lambs or Familiar Explanations of Some Religious Terms for her students to use.

Descendants of John and Margaretta Brown include Senator Benjamin Gratz Brown, the 20th governor of Missouri and vice presidential candidate in the 1872 election, and children's author Margaret Wise Brown.

== Politics ==
=== Secret mission ===
In May 1783 the young John Brown was commissioned by Robert Morris, Superintendent of Finance and President of the Secret Committee of Foreign Affairs Correspondence of the US government to visit Luis de Unzaga "le Conciliateur", who served him as an intermediary in his secret mission to free the trade with the United States thanks to bills of exchange from the bankers Le Couteulx. Brown's secret mission was a failure because of a "want of confidence" by Spanish officials in Cuba regarding American financial stability.

=== Virginia legislature ===
Brown became politically active after being admitted to the bar. He was elected to the Virginia state Senate, succeeding William Christian, where he served from 1783 to 1788. He was succeeded by William Russell.

The Virginia legislature sent him as a delegate to the Continental Congress in 1787 and 1788. When the U.S. Constitution became effective, Brown was twice elected to the U.S. House of Representatives, serving from 1789 to 1792.

=== Kentucky statehood and Senate tenure ===
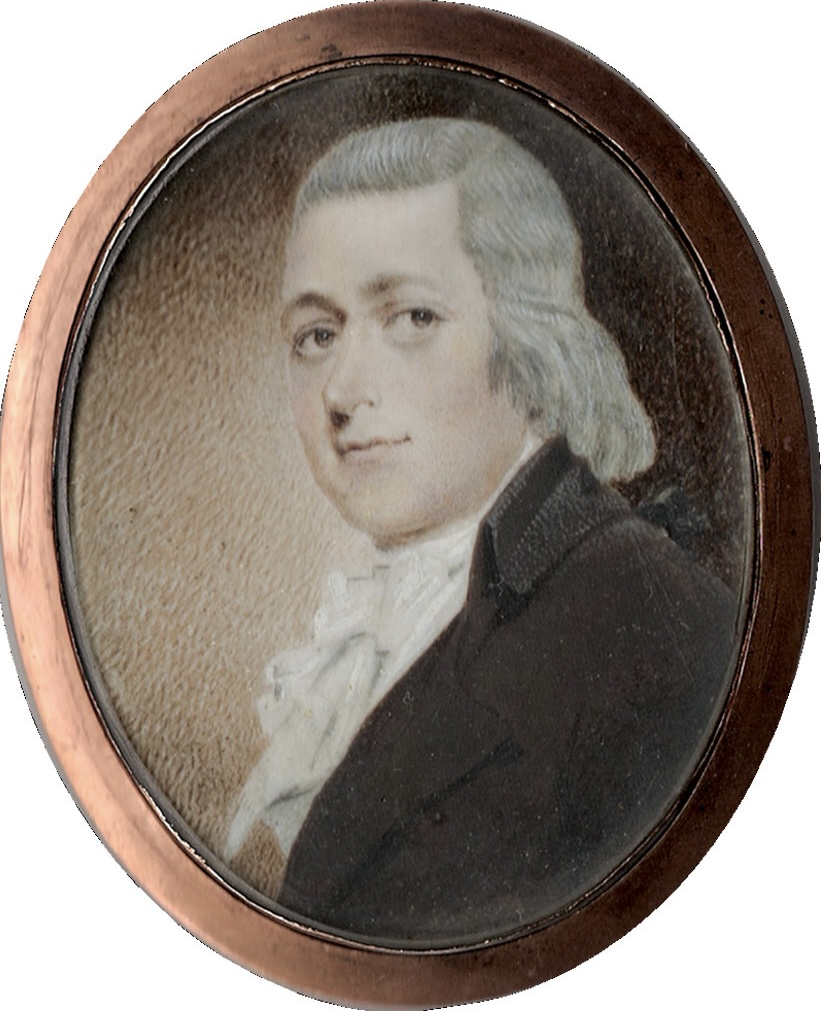
Portrait miniature attributed to Robert Field, c. 1800

As a Congressman representing Virginia, Brown introduced the petition for Kentucky Statehood. When Kentucky became a state in 1792, he resigned from the House on June 1, 1792. On June 18, the Kentucky legislature elected him to the United States Senate (as was the practice then) for a term ending in 1793. He was re-elected twice and served until 1805. He was President pro tem during the Eighth Congress. During Brown's Senate service, he moved to Frankfort, Kentucky, the capital of the state.

Brown was one of four senators to oppose authorizing military force for the Quasi-War.

== Other works ==
In 1805, Brown was defeated for re-election to the Senate and retired to Liberty Hall. He remained active in a number of public matters for the remaining thirty years of his life. In 1800, he purchased a ferry that crossed the Kentucky River at Frankfort. Brown managed large areas of property in central Kentucky and 20,000 acres (81 km^{2}) near Chillicothe, Ohio. He was a founding member of the Frankfort Water Company and director of the first Bank of Kentucky.

In 1812 Brown was appointed by the legislature to oversee the construction of a public house of worship on the public square of Frankfort. In 1829 Brown was elected as the Sheriff of Franklin County.

He also served on the board that oversaw the construction of the brick Capitol building and the limestone one that replaced it (now known as the Old Capitol). In 1836, Brown presided over the organizational meeting of the Kentucky Historical Society.

== Liberty Hall ==
John Brown died on August 29, 1837, in Lexington, Kentucky, at age 79, and was brought to Frankfort for burial. In 1847, he was re-interred in the Frankfort Cemetery.

The home he occupied in his later years is preserved as Liberty Hall Historic Site located at 202 Wilkinson Street in Frankfort. The site contains two houses: Liberty Hall (1796) built by John Brown, and the Orlando Brown House (1835), designed by Gideon Shryock, and owned by Senator Brown's second son. Liberty Hall is operated as a house museum and is open to the public. Liberty Hall Historic Site is a 501(c)3 organization owned and operated by Liberty Hall, Inc., and The National Society of the Colonial Dames of America in the Commonwealth of Kentucky.

U.S. House of Representatives
Preceded by Position established	Member of the U.S. House of Representatives from Virginia's 2nd congressional district 1789–1792	Succeeded by Andrew Moore
U.S. Senate
Preceded by None; first in line	U.S. senator (Class 2) from Kentucky; 1792–1805; Served alongside: John Edwards, Humphrey Marshall, John Breckinridge	Succeeded by Buckner Thruston
Political offices
Preceded by Stephen R. Bradley	President pro tempore of the United States Senate; 1803–1804	Succeeded by Jesse Franklin
