= John Edwards (Kentucky politician) =

American politician

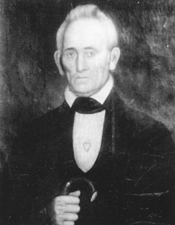

United States Senator from Kentucky
- In office June 18, 1792 – March 4, 1795
- Preceded by: Position established
- Succeeded by: Humphrey Marshall

Member of the Kentucky Senate
- In office 1796–1800

Member of the Kentucky House of Representatives
- In office 1795

Member of the Virginia House of Delegates
- In office 1781–1783, 1785, 1786

Personal details
- Born: 1748 Stafford County, Virginia
- Died: 1837 (aged 88–89) Paris, Kentucky
- Party: Anti-Administration

John Edwards (1748–1837) was an American planter and statesman who played a key role in securing Kentucky statehood, and represented the new state in the United States Senate.

Edwards was born in Stafford County, Virginia, and moved to Fayette County to start a plantation in what is now Bourbon County, Kentucky, around 1780. He represented his county in the Virginia House of Delegates in several years and was part of the commission that determined the borders for Kentucky in 1788. In 1792 he was a delegate to the convention that drafted the first constitution for the new state, and when statehood was accomplished he and John Brown were the first U.S. senators for Kentucky.

After his term as a senator he served in both houses of the state legislature. He died on his plantation and was buried in the family graveyard near Paris, Kentucky.

His sons, Haden Edwards and Benjamin W. Edwards, were land speculators in Texas who led the failed Fredonian Rebellion against Mexican control.

U.S. Senate
Preceded by First	U.S. senator (Class 3) from Kentucky; 1792–1795; Served alongside: John Brown	Succeeded by Humphrey Marshall
