= John Bradford (printer) =

American printer

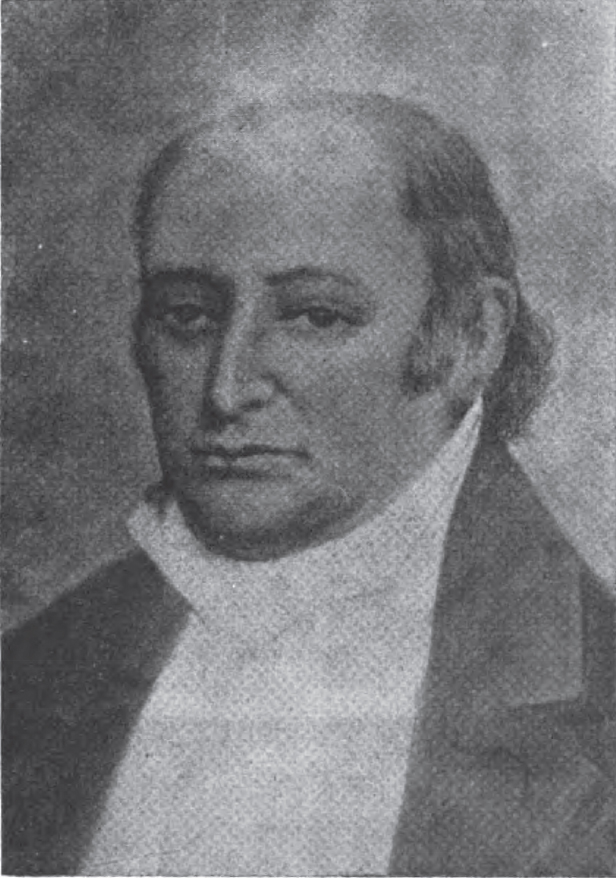
- Born: 1749; Prince William County, Virginia
- Died: 1830 (aged 80–81); Lexington, Kentucky
- Occupations: Printer, publisher, historian
- Spouse: Eliza James Bradford

John Bradford (1749–1830) was an early American settler in Kentucky, where he established himself as one of the territory's leading printers.

== Biography ==
Bradford was born in Prince William County, Virginia in 1749. He first arrived in Kentucky with a surveying party in 1775. He moved his family there in 1784 or 1785. Although he had little experience in printing or editing, he founded the Kentucky Gazette in 1787. It was the first newspaper printed in Kentucky and had no rivals within 500 miles until 1795. It remains in circulation today. He also printed the first book published in Kentucky, a compilation of the first session of the Kentucky legislature in 1792, shortly after Kentucky became the 15th state of the United States.

Bradford also contributed to the founding of Transylvania University. He was chairman of the Board of Trustees of that university from 1793 until his death in 1830.

== Historical article series ==
In August 1828, Bradford began a series of 66 newspaper articles that chronicled the history of Kentucky. Most of the articles concern events that occurred before 1800, with the exception of some articles about controversies at Transylvania University. The articles dealt with four main topics. The first was the warfare with Native Americans that had occurred through the 1790s. Bradford cast the settlers in a favorable light in this struggle. The second topic was the effort to secure free use of the Mississippi River and port at New Orleans from Spain. This was a valuable outlet for surplus produce during the formation of the state. Third, Bradford chronicled the series of ten conventions that led to Kentucky's separation from Virginia and admittance into the union in 1792. The articles concerning events at Transylvania University constitute the fourth topic.

== See also ==
- Fielding Bradford House
