= Kentucky Gazette =

The Kentucky Gazette, or Kentucke Gazette, was the first newspaper published in the state of Kentucky. It was started in Lexington by Fielding and John Bradford in 1787 (as Kentucke Gazette), and continued into 1789 with the current spelling of the state.

The first issue was published on August 11, 1787.

Currently, the newspaper is published monthly in Frankfort.
