= Blenheim =

Blenheim (/ˈblɛnɪm/ BLEN-im) is the English name of Blindheim, a village in Bavaria, Germany, which was the site of the Battle of Blenheim in 1704. Almost all places and other things called Blenheim are named directly or indirectly in honour of the battle.

== Places ==
=== United Kingdom ===
- Blenheim, Leeds, an inner city area of the English city of Leeds, West Yorkshire
- Blenheim, Oxfordshire, a civil parish in England
  - Blenheim Palace, a large stately home built for the victor of the Battle of Blenheim, John Churchill, 1st Duke of Marlborough

=== United States ===
- Blenheim (Maryland), the historic Maryland estate of the Lees of Virginia
- Blenheim, New Jersey, an unincorporated community in Gloucester Township, New Jersey
- Blenheim, New York, a town in Schoharie County, New York
- Blenheim, South Carolina, a town in Marlboro County, South Carolina
- Blenheim, Virginia, an unincorporated area in Albemarle County, Virginia
  - Blenheim (Blenheim, Virginia), a historic home and farm complex in Albemarle County, Virginia
  - Blenheim Vineyards, modern winery in Albemarle County, Virginia honoring late 18th century winery nearby
- Blenheim (Spring Mills, Virginia), a historic home in Campbell County, Virginia
- Historic Blenheim, a 19th-century Greek Revival farm house near Fairfax, Virginia
- Blenheim (Ballsville, Virginia), a historic home in Powhatan County, Virginia
- Blenheim (Wakefield Corner, Virginia), a historic home in Westmoreland County, Virginia

=== Other places ===
- Blenheim, Queensland, a rural locality in Australia
- Blenheim, Ontario, a town in Chatham-Kent, Ontario, Canada
- Blandford-Blenheim, a township in Oxford County, Ontario
- Blenheim, Jamaica, a place on the List of National Heritage Sites in Jamaica
- Blenheim, New Zealand, a town in the north of the South Island of New Zealand
- Blenheim Reef, part of the Chagos Archipelago

== Military ==
- Battle of Blenheim, a 1704 battle of the War of the Spanish Succession
- HMS Blenheim, several ships of the Royal Navy
- Bristol Blenheim, a World War II-era light bomber used primarily by the Royal Air Force

== Plants ==
- Blenheim Orange, a cultivar of apple
- Blenheim apricot, a variety of apricot
- Blenheim Royal (Schreiner 1990), a tall, blue, bearded iris

== Other uses ==
- Blenheim (horse) (1927–1958), a Thoroughbred racehorse that won the Epsom Derby
- Blenheim (ship), several vessels by that name
- Blenheim, the brown/red and white Cavalier King Charles Spaniel
- Blenheim Ginger Ale, a drink originally bottled in Blenheim, South Carolina, United States
- Blenheim High School, a school in Surrey, United Kingdom
- Blenheim Horse Trials, a competition held at Blenheim Palace
- Blenheim Music and Camping Festival, a two-day music festival held in the Clare Valley in South Australia
