= Blenheim (Blenheim, Virginia) =

Historic house in Virginia, United States

- U.S. National Register of Historic Places
- Virginia Landmarks Register
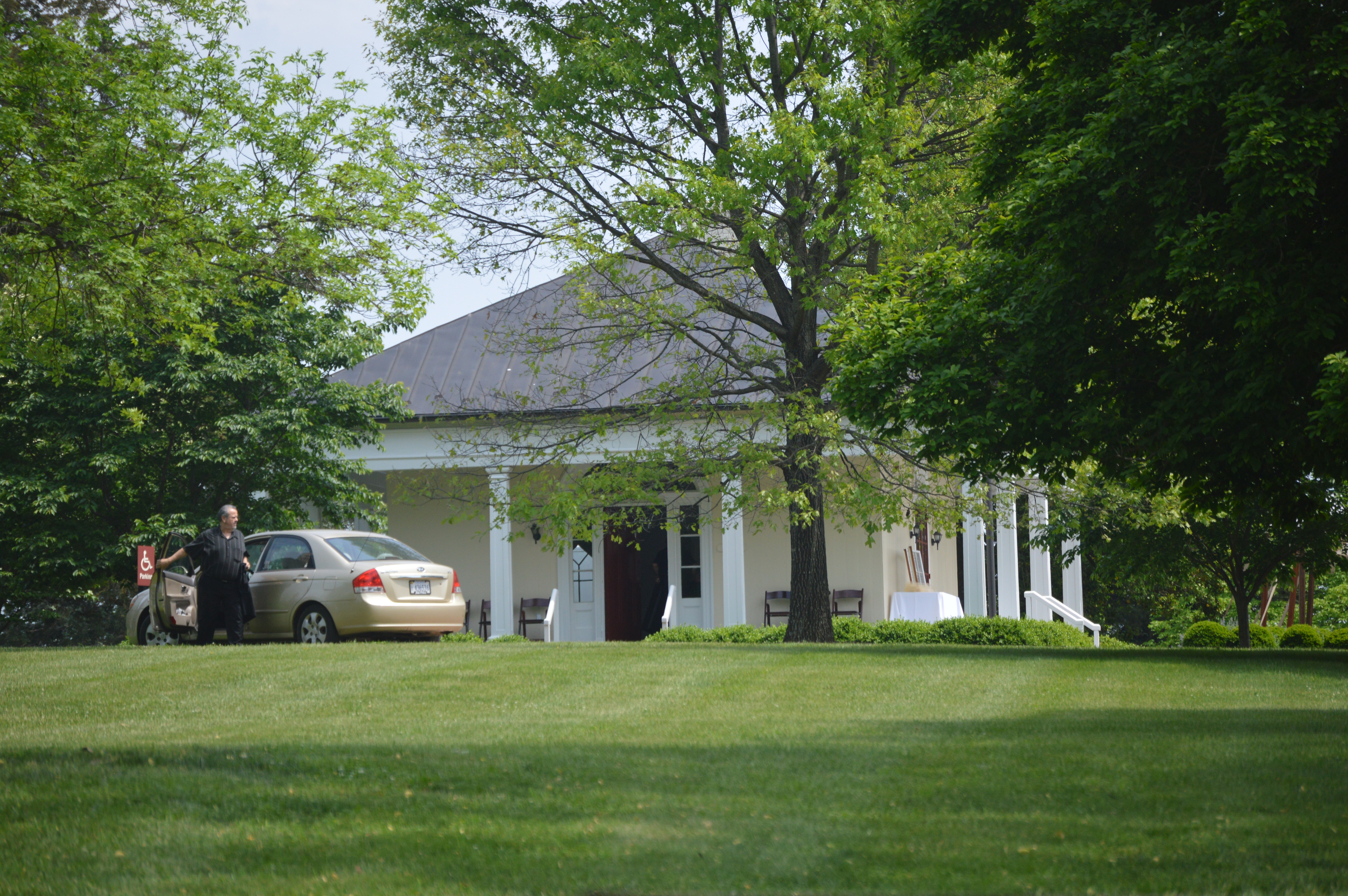
- Roadside view of the main house

- Location within Virginia Location within the United States
- Location: South of Charlottesville on Blenheim Road, Blenheim, Virginia
- Coordinates: 37°55′46″N 78°29′31″W
- Area: 175 acres (71 ha)
- Built: 1750, 1846
- Architectural style: Greek Revival, Gothic Revival
- NRHP reference No.: 76002089
- VLR No.: 002-0005

Significant dates
- Added to NRHP: May 17, 1976
- Designated VLR: December 16, 1975

Blenheim is a historic home and farm complex located at Blenheim, Albemarle County, Virginia. The once very large surrounding plantation was established by John Carter. Late in the 18th century, his son Edward Carter became the county's largest landowner, and in addition to public duties including service in the Virginia General Assembly built a mansion on this plantation where he and his family resided mostly in summers (and which he leased to the Virginia government during the American Revolutionary War to house captured British officers pending prisoner exchanges), but which was destroyed by fire and sold by auction circa 1840.

The current historic main house and outbuildings were built by politician and diplomat Andrew Stevenson in 1846. It is a 1 1/2-story, six-bay, gable-roofed frame building with Gothic Revival and Greek Revival style details. It has an ell at the rear of the west end. The front facade features a pair of one-story tetrastyle porches with pairs of Doric order piers. A notable outbuilding is the square "Athenaeum", a one-story, one-room, frame Greek Revival building with a pyramidal hipped roof and portico supported on Doric piers. Also on the property are a frame kitchen/laundry, a "chapel" or schoolhouse, and two smoke houses. Also on the property are two dwellings, one of which is supposed to have been built to accommodate Justice Roger B. Taney on his visits to Blenheim.

It was added to the National Register of Historic Places in 1976.

Blenheim Vineyards was established in 2000 on part of the property once owned by Edward Carter (of Blenheim), who sold a parcel to Thomas Jefferson which was in turn sold to Filippo Mazzei, who established one of the first Virginia wineries early in the 19th century.

Sites with a similar names but in other Virginia counties include

- Blenheim (Spring Mills, Virginia), a historic home in Campbell County, Virginia
- Historic Blenheim, a 19th-century Greek Revival farm house in Fairfax County, Virginia
- Blenheim (Ballsville, Virginia), a historic home in Powhatan County, Virginia
- Blenheim (Wakefield Corner, Virginia), a historic home in Westmoreland County, Virginia
