= Attorney General Nicholas =

Attorney General Nicholas may refer to:

- George Nicholas (politician) (died 1799), Attorney General of Kentucky
- Philip N. Nicholas (1773–1849), Attorney General of Virginia

== See also ==
- Joey San Nicolas (born 1973), Attorney General of the Northern Mariana Islands
- Herbert Nicholls (1868–1940), Attorney-General of Tasmania
