= Wilson Cary Nicholas =

American politician (1761–1820)

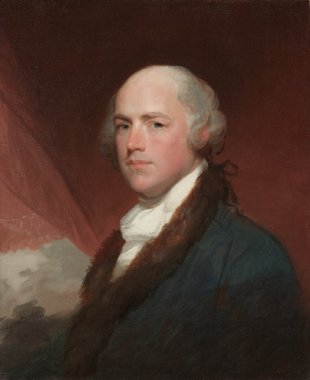
- Wilson Cary Nicholas, by Gilbert Stuart. 1805.

19th Governor of Virginia
- In office December 1, 1814 – December 1, 1816
- Preceded by: James Barbour
- Succeeded by: James P. Preston

Member of the U.S. House of Representatives from Virginia's 21st district
- In office March 4, 1807 – November 27, 1809
- Preceded by: Thomas M. Randolph, Jr.
- Succeeded by: David S. Garland

United States Senator from Virginia
- In office December 5, 1799 – May 22, 1804
- Preceded by: Henry Tazewell
- Succeeded by: Andrew Moore

Member of the Virginia House of Delegates from Albemarle County
- In office 1794 – December 1799 Serving with Edward Moore, Joseph Jones Monroe, Francis Walker
- Preceded by: William Clarke
- Succeeded by: William Woods

Member of the Virginia House of Delegates from Albemarle County
- In office 1788–1789 Serving with Francis Walker
- Preceded by: George Nicholas
- Succeeded by: William Clarke

Member of the Virginia House of Delegates from Albemarle County
- In office 1784–1786 Serving with Joshua Fry; Edward Carter
- Preceded by: George Nicholas
- Succeeded by: George Nicholas

Personal details
- Born: January 31, 1761 Williamsburg, Colony of Virginia, British America
- Died: October 10, 1820 (aged 59) Charlottesville, Albemarle County, Virginia, U.S.
- Party: Democratic-Republican
- Spouse: Margaret “Peggy” Smith (m.1785)
- Relations: Robert Carter Nicholas Sr. (Father); George Nicholas (Brother); John Nicholas (Brother); Robert C. Nicholas (Nephew); Samuel Smith (Brother in law); Robert Smith (Brother in Law)
- Children: 10
- Education: College of William & Mary

Wilson Cary Nicholas (January 31, 1761 – October 10, 1820) was an American politician who served in the U.S. Senate from 1799 to 1804 and was the 19th governor of Virginia from 1814 to 1816.

== Early life ==
Nicholas was born in Williamsburg in the Colony of Virginia on January 31, 1761. The son of Robert Carter Nicholas Sr. and his wife Ann Cary, he was born into the First Families of Virginia and had ten siblings (of whom seven reached adulthood). His eldest brother George Nicholas (1754–1799) became a Virginia legislator before moving to Kentucky, and his elder brother John Nicholas (1756–1820) would serve as a Virginia legislator and U.S. Congressman before moving to New York. His youngest brother, Philip Norborne Nicholas (1776–1849), served as Virginia's attorney general from 1800 to 1819 before becoming a state judge. Only their brother Lewis Nicholas (1766–1840) failed to enter politics. His eldest sister Sarah married John Hatley Norton of Winchester, and his sister Elizabeth Carter Nicholas (1753–1810) married Edmund Jennings Randolph (1753–1813), who preceded Nicholas as Governor of Virginia. However, his sisters Mary (1759–1796) and Judith (b. 1765) and brother Robert (b. 1768) never reached adulthood.

=== Education ===
As was customary for his class, Nicholas received a private education and later attended the College of William & Mary. Nicholas studied law, probably with his father and possibly with George Wythe.

=== Family ===
Nicholas married Margaret Smith (1765–1849) of Baltimore, and they had nine children. His brother George married Margaret's sister, Mary. Thus his brothers-in-law (the sisters' brother) were Samuel Smith and Robert Smith.

Three of the children of Wilson Cary Nicholas and Margaret Smith Nicholas married Baltimore residents, including Mary Nicholas, who married John Patterson; Sarah, who married J. Howard McHenry; and John Nicholas (b. 1800), who married Mary Jane Carr Hollins. Their son Wilson Nicholas and daughter Margaret died unmarried. Sidney Nicholas married Dabney Carr, and Cary Ann Nicholas married John Spear Smith, all of whom had children.

Perhaps the most famous of his family members was his nephew Robert C. Nicholas, who moved to Louisiana and became a U.S. Senator. Another significant family member was Jane Hollins Nicholas (1798–1871), who married Thomas Jefferson's grandson Thomas Jefferson Randolph (1792–1875). Randolph spent years disentangling the financial arrears of his father-in-law's estate.

== Revolutionary War ==
Nicholas served as a lieutenant in the Albemarle County Militia during the American Revolution.

== Career ==
=== Lawyer and planter ===
Nicholas was admitted to the Virginia bar in 1778 and returned to Albemarle County after the war. By 1794, he settled his family at a plantation along the James River, which he called "Mount Warren". Like his father and relatives, Nicholas farmed and operated his household using enslaved labor. Tobacco was the main crop in Albemarle County. Still, in the 1790s, Richmond merchant Robert Gamble convinced W.C. Nicholas to switch to wheat when everyone was aware of the damage erosion and tobacco's nutrient demands made to the local soil, and wheat prices had risen. However, Nicholas would have a longstanding feud with the Scott family over the location of the tobacco and wheat warehouses along the James River in Albemarle County. Nicholas temporarily won in 1789, as the town of Warren was established on his lands. Still, by 1817, the terminus of the Rockfish Gap turnpike became Scottsville. In the 1787 Virginia tax census, Nicholas enslaved 39 adults and 23 children, as well as 22 horses and 49 cattle and a four-wheeled phaeton in Albemarle County. In the final census in his lifetime, Nicholas enslaved 57 people in Albemarle County, of whom 32 worked in agriculture, including 9 girls and 8 boys under age 14, and 6 men and 6 women more than 45 years old.

=== Politician ===
Meanwhile, Albemarle County voters elected (and re-elected) Nicholas as one of their two members of the Virginia House of Delegates several times, and he served in that part-time position from 1784 to 1785 and again from 1788 to 1789.

Both he and his brother George (who served several times when W.C. Nicholas did not run) represented Albemarle County in the ratifying convention of 1788. They favored the adoption of the federal Constitution. During the convention's debates, on June 6, 1788, Wilson Cary Nicholas countered Patrick Henry's objection that correcting defects in the new national Constitution by way of the Article V convention would be challenging. Nicholas said, "The conventions which shall be so called will have their deliberations confined to a few points; no local interest to divert their attention; nothing but the necessary alterations. They will have many advantages over the last Convention. No experiments to devise; the general and fundamental regulations being already laid down." The Convention ultimately voted to ratify the federal Constitution, despite the opposition of most other representatives of Piedmont counties. The Nicholas family (and that of relative Edward Carter of Blenheim) remained Federalists for years, despite the popularity within the county of Thomas Jefferson. From 1794 to 1800, Nicholas again won election and several times on re-election as one of Albemarle County's two representatives in the House of Delegates.

Fellow legislators elected Nicholas as a Democratic-Republican to the U.S. Senate to fill the vacancy caused by the death of Henry Tazewell. Nicholas served as one of Virginia's senators from December 5, 1799, until May 22, 1804, when he resigned to become a port collector of Norfolk 1804–1807.

Nicholas re-entered the public arena and won election to the U.S. House of Representatives in the Tenth and Eleventh Congresses. He served from March 4, 1807, until his resignation on November 27, 1809. He was elected Governor of Virginia in 1814 and served until 1816, when he retired from office, as the state constitution forbade second terms.

=== Bank of the United States ===
Nicholas became president of the Richmond branch of the Second Bank of the United States, charted by fellow Virginian and President James Madison in 1816, after Nicholas' daughter Jane married Thomas Jefferson Randolph, eldest and favorite grandson of Nicholas' longtime neighbor and friend, Thomas Jefferson. The bank made several loans to the former president, who was beset with high expenses. However, Nicholas also speculated in western lands, which put him in serious debt during the Panic of 1819. Jefferson had endorsed two of Nicholas's notes for $10,000 each, believing that Nicholas' plantations were worth more than $350,000. However, after Nicholas' death, his lands were worth only a third of that amount, and the estate was insolvent, which indebtedness considerably worsened Jefferson's financial situation, as described below.

== Death ==
He died on October 11, 1820, at Tufton, the plantation home of his daughter Jane and her husband, Thomas Jefferson Randolph, now part of Jefferson's Monticello near Charlottesville, Virginia. Nicholas was interred in the Jefferson burying ground at Monticello, near Charlottesville. However, when Jefferson died on July 4, 1826, and an inventory was taken of his estate, debts attributable to Nicholas' insolvency far exceeded those incurred by Jefferson personally, which led to the sale of the furnishing and enslaved people of Monticello, and which was not finally extinguished by his descendants until 1878, following Jeff Randolph's death.

== Legacy ==
The Virginia General Assembly named Nicholas County, West Virginia in his honor in 1818. Also named for him is a residence hall at William and Mary.

U.S. Senate
Preceded by Henry Tazewell	U.S. senator (Class 2) from Virginia; December 5, 1799 – May 22, 1804; Served alongside: Stevens T. Mason, John Taylor, Abraham B. Venable	Succeeded by Andrew Moore
U.S. House of Representatives
Preceded by Thomas M. Randolph, Jr.	Member of the U.S. House of Representatives from Virginia's 21st congressional district March 4, 1807 – November 27, 1809	Succeeded by David S. Garland
Political offices
Preceded by James Barbour	Governor of Virginia; December 1, 1814 – December 1, 1816	Succeeded by James P. Preston
