= John Robertson (Virginia politician) =

American politician

John Robertson (April 13, 1787 – July 5, 1873) was a nineteenth-century politician and lawyer from the U.S. state of Virginia. He was the brother of Thomas B. Robertson and Wyndham Robertson.

== Biography ==
Born at "Bellefield" near Petersburg, Virginia, Robertson completed preparatory studies and graduated from the College of William and Mary. He studied law and was admitted to the bar, commencing practice in Richmond, Virginia. He served as Attorney General of Virginia before being elected an Anti-Jacksonian and Whig to the United States House of Representatives to fill a vacancy, serving from 1834 to 1839. Afterwards, Robertson served as judge of the circuit court of chancery for Henrico County, Virginia for several years and was a delegate to the peace convention in Washington, D.C. in 1861. He was a member of the Virginia State Senate from 1861 to 1863 before his death at "Mount Athos" near Lynchburg, Virginia on July 5, 1873. He was interred in a private cemetery on the property.

Legal offices
Preceded by Philip Norborne Nicholas	Attorney General of Virginia; 1819–1834	Succeeded by Sidney Smith Baxter
U.S. House of Representatives
Preceded by Andrew Stevenson	Member of the U.S. House of Representatives from Virginia's 18th congressional district December 1, 1834 – March 3, 1835	Succeeded by George Loyall
Preceded by William McComas	Member of the U.S. House of Representatives from Virginia's 19th congressional district March 4, 1835 – March 3, 1837	Succeeded by Archibald Stuart
Preceded by John Roane	Member of the U.S. House of Representatives from Virginia's 11th congressional district March 4, 1837 – March 3, 1839	Succeeded by Green Samuels
