= Robert Carter Nicholas Sr. =

American legislator and judge (1728–1780)

Judge of the High Court of Chancery of Virginia
- In office 14 January 1778 – November 1780

Member of the Virginia House of Delegates for James City County
- In office 1776–1777 Serving with William Norvell
- Preceded by: position established
- Succeeded by: Nathaniel Burwell

Member of the House of Burgesses for James City County
- In office 1766–1776 Serving with Lewis Burwell, William Norvell
- Preceded by: Philip Johnson
- Succeeded by: position abolished

Member of the House of Burgesses for York County
- In office 1756–1761 Serving with Dudley Digges
- Preceded by: John Norton
- Succeeded by: Thomas Nelson Jr.

Personal details
- Born: 28 January 1728/9
- Died: November 1780
- Spouse: Anne Cary
- Relatives: Wilson Cary Nicholas. John Nicholas, George Nicholas, Philip Norborne Nicholas, Lewis Nicholas (sons); Robert C. Nicholas (grandson)
- Education: College of William and Mary

Virginia Colony currency

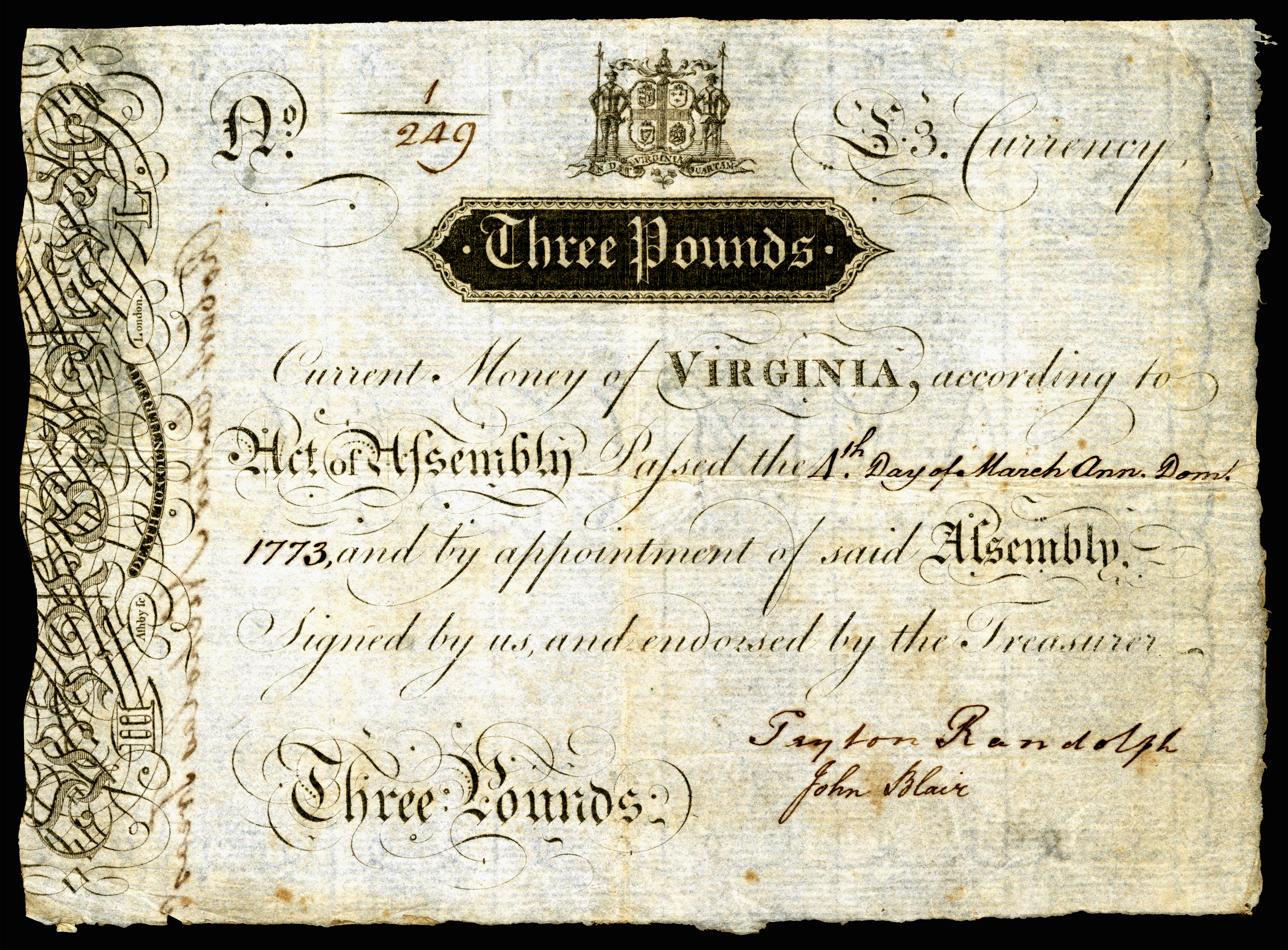
Signatures of Peyton Randolph and John Blair Jr.

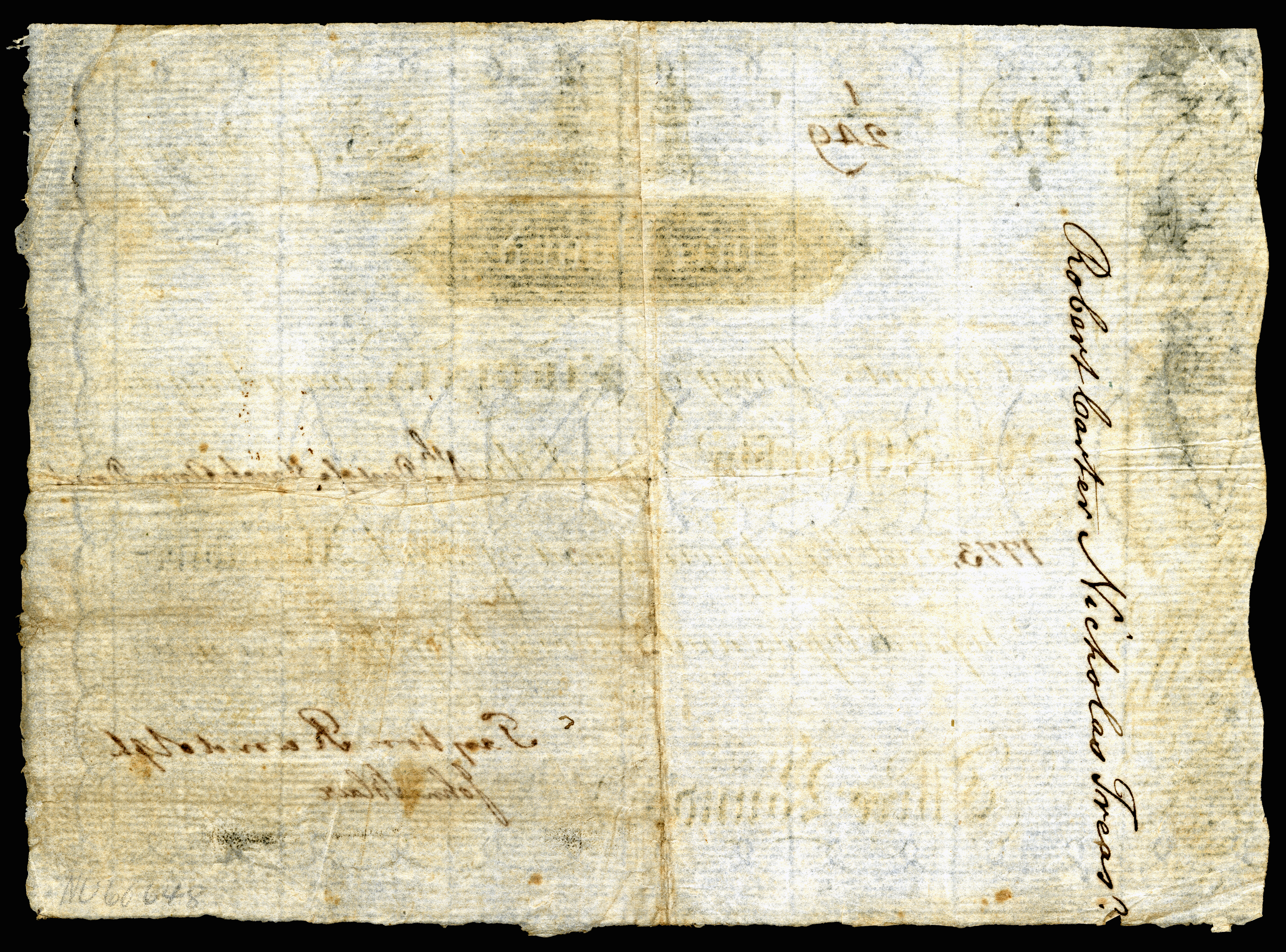
Countersigned by Robert Carter Nicholas Sr. as Treasurer.

Robert Carter Nicholas (January 28, 1728-September 8, 1780) was a Virginia lawyer, patriot, legislator and judge. He served in the Virginia House of Burgesses and its successor, the Virginia House of Delegates. He became the last treasurer of the Colony of Virginia, and sat on the first High Court of Chancery, one of the predecessors of the Supreme Court of Virginia.

== Early life and education ==
Robert Carter Nicholas was born on January 28, 1728 or 1729, in Hanover County to Elizabeth Carter Burwell (1692-1734; widow of Nathaniel Burwell of Williamsburg, Virginia) and her second husband, Dr. George Nicholas (1685-1734). His father was a British medical doctor and convict, transported for forgery. His mother was the daughter of wealthy Virginia landowner, Robert "King" Carter of Corotoman. Carter and his full brother would arguably found another of the First Families of Virginia. He had several elder Burwell half-brothers (Lewis Burwell and Carter Burwell — both of whom died in 1756 — and Robert Carter Burwell who died in 1777) as well an elder full brother, John Nicholas (1726-1814), who served in the House of Burgesses representing Buckingham County, and after its creation served forty years as the clerk of Albemarle County (and was succeeded by his son John Jr.). Earlier, the year Robert Carter Nicholas was born, his father became the burgess representing the College of William and Mary. However, Dr. Nicholas only served two years, and both boys were orphaned in March 1734, when both their parents died. Their uncle John Carter, the colony's secretary and a wealthy planter, became at least Nicholas' guardian and raised him with his sons (future legislators Charles Hill Carter and Edward Carter) at Shirley Plantation. All three boys were schooled in Gloucester County, and after John Carter died, all three boys became the wards of their uncle Landon Carter. The three cousins completed their education at the College of William and Mary, where R.C. Nicholas studied law under professor George Wythe, who was also litigating aspects of Secretary John Carter's estate.

== Early career ==
Nicholas was admitted to the bar and practiced in the general court under the royal government while Virginia was a colony. His first documented court appearance concerned announcement that he would settle the estate of his wealthy half-brother Lewis Burwell, who has been a burgess for Gloucester county before being appointed to the Governor's Council and briefly serving as its president before his death in 1756.

In October 1765 Nicholas, along with John Randolph and George Wythe, were the committee that heard Thomas Jefferson's bar examinations. Later when Nicholas became Treasurer of Virginia, he stopped taking new cases and turned over many of his existing cases to Jefferson, also a Wythe protege.

From 1761 to 1774, Nicholas served as one of the trustees of the Bray School - a charity school for black children - in Williamsburg, Virginia. He was the principal correspondent with Dr. Bray's Associates in England, who financed the school.

== Political career and American Revolutionary War ==
In late 1755, York County voters first elected Nicholas as one of their representatives in the House of Burgesses, a part-time position, and he took his seat in March 1756, then won re-election in 1758, serving from 1756 to 1761. During this term, the Governor's Council appointed Nicholas to the committee of correspondence, where he served with Peyton Randolph, George Wythe and John Robinson even when not a burgess. Nicholas then moved to nearby James City County where elections were held in July 1765, and he took his seat in November, then was elected and re-elected one of its representative from 1766 to 1775. He was conservative but patriotic, supporting the Stamp Act resolutions in 1764, but deeming further resolutions offered by Patrick Henry the following year premature. Following the corruption scandal disclosed upon the death of powerful speaker of the House of Burgesses, John Robinson, who also served as the colony's Treasurer and thus could conceal his improperly lending out paper money scheduled to be burned to political supporters, the House of Burgesses at Nicholas' urging, separated the two positions. Nicholas became the Treasurer of Virginia, and served from 1766 to 1775, when Lord Dunmore, the colony's last governor, suppressed the legislature.

When in 1769 Peyton Randolph, Speaker of the House of Burgesses, chose Thomas Jefferson to write a response to Royal Governor Lord Botetourt's opening remarks to the House, his motions although accepted and passed were felt in committee to be "lean and tepid" requiring rewrite by Nicholas. Jefferson never forgot this humiliation. In fact, in 1774 Jefferson had to rewrite a motion written by Nicholas objecting to the next Royal Governor Lord Dunmore's land proclamation.

In 1773, fellow burgesses made him Nicholas a member of the committee of correspondence, and when Peyton Randolph resigned, Nicholas served as the president pro tem of the House of Burgesses in July 1775. Continuing his cautious conservatism, in May 1774, Nicholas introduced a motion making June 1 a "day of fasting, humiliation, and prayer" to express sympathy of Virginia for their sister colony of Massachusetts as a result of the closing of the Port of Boston by the British under the Boston Port Act. In March 1775, Nicholas opposed Patrick Henry's proposal to organize the militia or raise 10,000 regulars to serve throughout the war.

On December 13, 1775, after the battle of Great Bridge, Nicholas introduced a motion in the House of Burgesses denouncing Lord Dunmore as champion of "tyranny" a monster, "inimical and cruel" for pronouncing martial law and assuming powers, the "King himself could not exercise." Two days later he also submitted a motion to grant pardons to black slaves who he claimed had been deluded by the British to join Loyalist forces.

After Lord Dunmore suppressed the House of Burgesses, James City County voters elected Nicholas as one of their representatives to all five Virginia Revolutionary Conventions, serving with William Norvell and (in the first revolutionary convention, with Lewis Burwell as well). When the Virginia House of Delegates was formed as the successor to the House of Burgesses, Nicholas and Norvell again became James City County's delegates, and won re-election in 1777, serving from 1776 to 1778.

Nicholas opposed the adoption of a Declaration of Independence on May 15, 1776, but declined to vote so that the convention's action might "go out with the prestige of unanimity". Nicholas became a member of the committee appointed to draft a declaration of rights and a new form of government for Virginia.

== Judicial career ==
In November 1776, Nicholas resigned as treasurer, and by the following July began moving his family to the Retreat, a plantation near the Pamunkey River in eastern Hanover County. His biographer explains that his reference to "indisposition" could indicate a chronic illness, in that era likely malaria or tuberculosis. Nonetheless, in 1779 fellow legislators appointed Nicholas to the high court of chancery, where he served with his mentor George Wythe, as well as Edmund Pendleton and John Blair. The court is now considered a predecessor of the Supreme Court of Virginia, but records for his relatively brief judicial career have been lost, as were files relating to those years in the counties in which he lived, and his last will and testament and the inventory of his estate. Although Edmund Pendleton would become the first president (chief judge) of its successor the Court of Appeals, and George Wythe chose to remain as chancellor, Judge Nicholas had already died, at his Hanover County residence, the Retreat, on September 8, 1780, and a Richmond newspaper noted his demise a few days later. He was buried, probably in the church of St. Peter's parish. A memorial marker now exists at Mount Brilliant cemetery, whose other famous interment is of John Henry, father of this man's sometime rival, Patrick Henry.

== Personal life ==
In 1751, Nicholas married Anne Cary (1735-1786), daughter of burgess Wilson Miles Cary of Warwick County. The couple had four daughters and six sons. All their sons became lawyers (although the two youngest were too young to read law under their father), and most served in the legislature. The most distinguished was Wilson Cary Nicholas (1761-1820), who became a U.S. senator and Virginia governor. Their son George Nicholas (1754-1799) served in the Continental Army, Virginia legislature and Ratifying Convention, but declined the post of U.S. Attorney for the District of Kentucky.George's son, Robert C. Nicholas moved to Kentucky and eventually became a United States Senator from Louisiana. John Nicholas (1764-1819) served in the U.S. House of Representatives from Virginia before moving to New York where he became a judge. The youngest son, Philip Norborne Nicholas (1776-1849) became Virginia's Attorney General not long after his father's death, and later a Virginia judge, but perhaps today is best known either as the prosecutor of George Wythe's murderer or as a member of the powerful Richmond junto. His twin brother, Lewis Valentine Nicholas (1776-1840), lived mostly in Albemarle County. Nicholas's daughter Elizabeth (1753–1810) married Edmund Randolph, a Virginia lawyer who became Governor and later the first United States Attorney General. His daughter Sally married John Norton, son of a London merchant who was one of her father's friends and himself a merchant in Yorktown, Virginia.

Edmund Randolph described Nicholas: "By nature he was benevolent and liberal. But he appeared to many who did not thoroughly understand him, to be haughty and austere; because they could not appreciate the preference of gravity for levity, when in conversation the sacredness of religion was involved in ridicule or language forgot its chastity."

== See also ==
- Golladay, Victor Dennis. "The Nicholas Family of Virginia, 1722-1820," PhD Diss, University of Virginia, 1973.
- Randall, William Sterne. "Thomas Jefferson, A Life"
