= Senator Tazewell =

Senator Tazewell may refer to:

- Henry Tazewell (1753–1799), U.S. Senator from Virginia
- Littleton Waller Tazewell (1774–1860), U.S. Senator from Virginia
