= Spring Mills, Virginia =

Unincorporated community in Virginia, United States

Spring Mills
- Unincorporated community
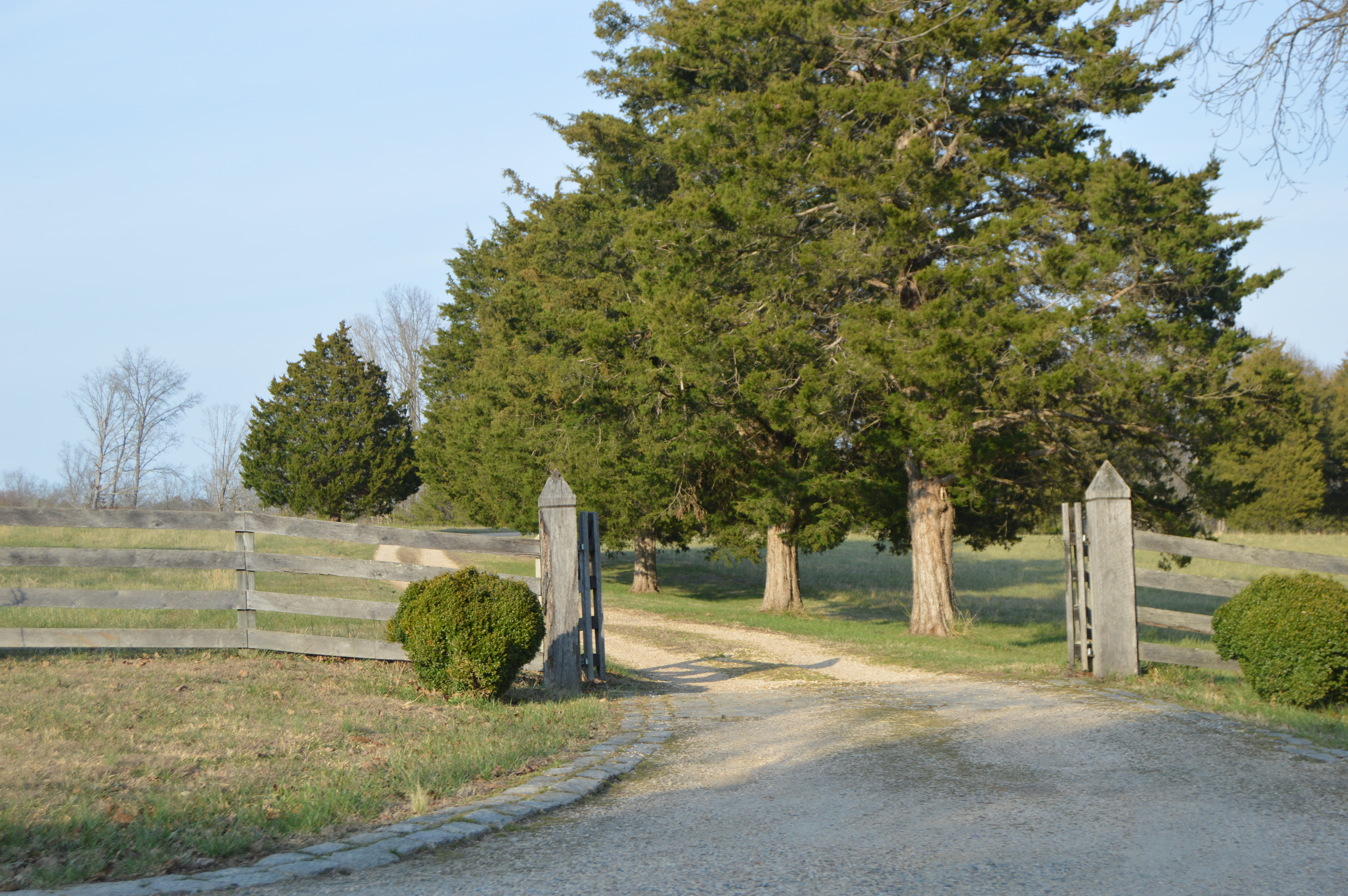
- Blenheim on the National Register of Historic Places

- Location within the state of Virginia Spring Mills (the United States)
- Coordinates: 37°14′43″N 78°55′09″W
- Country: United States
- State: Virginia
- County: Appomattox, Campbell
- Time zone: Eastern (EST)
  - Summer (DST): EDT
- ZIP codes: 24538
- GNIS feature ID: 1477779

Spring Mills is an unincorporated community in Appomattox County, Virginia, United States.

Blenheim was listed on the National Register of Historic Places in 1979, with a boundary increase in 1994.
