= Andrew Stevenson =

American politician (1784–1857)

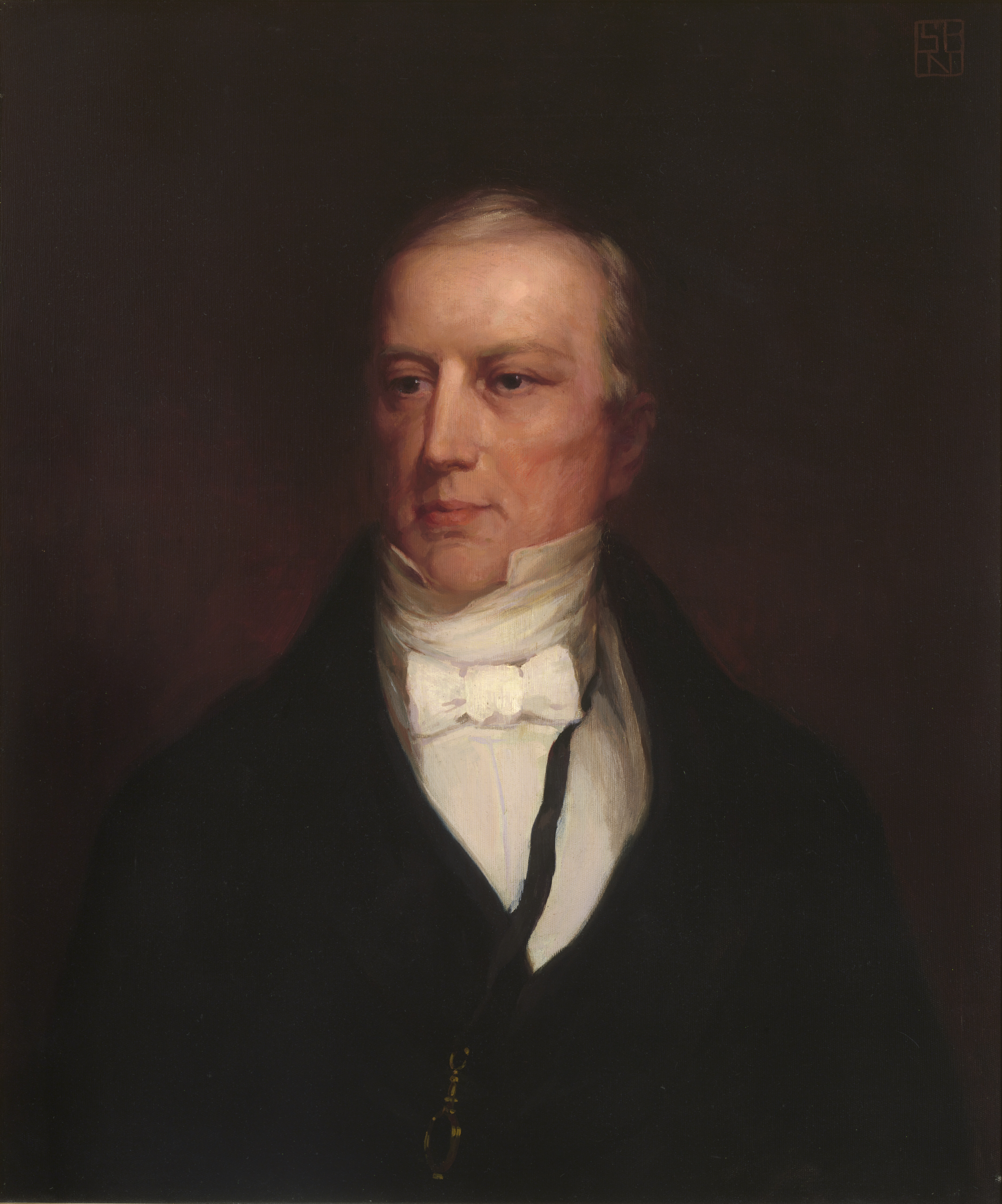
- Portrait by Spencer Baird Nichols, c. 1911

United States Minister to the United Kingdom
- In office July 13, 1836 – October 21, 1841
- President: Andrew Jackson; Martin Van Buren; William Henry Harrison; John Tyler
- Preceded by: Aaron Vail (as chargé d'affaires)
- Succeeded by: Edward Everett

11th Speaker of the United States House of Representatives
- In office December 3, 1827 – June 2, 1834
- Preceded by: John W. Taylor
- Succeeded by: John Bell

Member of the U.S. House of Representatives from Virginia
- In office March 4, 1821 – June 2, 1834
- Preceded by: John Tyler
- Succeeded by: John Robertson
- Constituency: 23rd district (1821–23); 9th district (1823–33); 11th district (1833–34)

Member of the Virginia House of Delegates from Richmond City
- In office December 4, 1809 – November 11, 1816
- Preceded by: William Wirt
- Succeeded by: John Robertson
- In office January 1819 – December 3, 1821
- Preceded by: John Robertson
- Succeeded by: Jacqueline B. Harvie

Personal details
- Born: January 21, 1784 Culpeper County, Virginia
- Died: January 25, 1857 (aged 73) Albemarle County, Virginia
- Party: Democratic
- Spouses: Mary Page White (m. 1809; died 1812) Sarah Coles (m. 1816; died 1848) Mary Schaff (m. 1849)
- Children: John White Stevenson
- Education: College of William & Mary
- Profession: Law

Andrew Stevenson (January 21, 1784 – January 25, 1857) was an American politician, lawyer and diplomat. He represented Richmond, Virginia in the Virginia House of Delegates and eventually became its speaker before being elected to the United States House of Representatives; its members subsequently elected him their Speaker. Stevenson also served in the Jackson administration for four years as the U.S. ambassador to the United Kingdom before retiring to his slave plantation in Albemarle County. He also served on the board of visitors of the University of Virginia and briefly as its rector before his death.

== Early life ==
Andrew Stevenson was born in Culpeper County, Virginia on January 21, 1784. He was the son of James Stevenson (1739–1809) and Frances Arnette (née Littlepage) Stevenson (1750–1808).

He received a private education appropriate to this class, then attended the College of William & Mary where he studied law.

== Career ==
Admitted to the Virginia bar in 1809, Stevenson practiced in Richmond.

=== Legislator ===
Richmond voters elected Stevenson as a member of the Virginia House of Delegates, and he served in that part-time position from 1809 to 1816 and 1818 to 1821. Fellow members elected him as Speaker of the House of Delegates during the War of 1812 and he served from 1812 to 1815. In both 1814 and 1816, Stevenson unsuccessfully sought a seat in the U.S. House of Representatives.

=== U.S. Congress ===
In 1820, Stevenson won election to the 17th U.S. Congress as a Democratic-Republican. When the party fragmented during the contentious 1824 presidential election, he first aligned himself with the Crawford faction during the 18th Congress, and then, for the remainder of his time in Congress, identified with the Jacksonians. He was elected Speaker of the House on December 3, 1827, the opening day of the 20th Congress. Reelected three times (1829, 1831 and 1833) he served until his resignation on June 2, 1834.

=== Minister to the United Kingdom ===
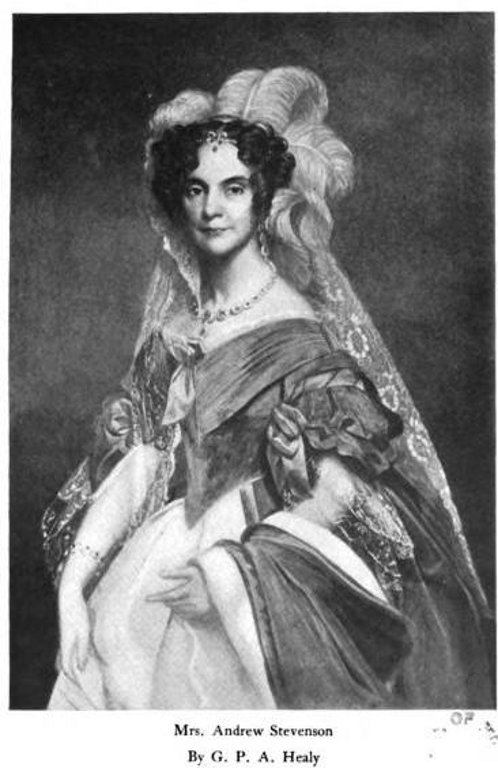
Sarah Coles, Stevenson's second wife

In June 1834, Stevenson resigned from Congress to accept appointment from Andrew Jackson as Minister to the United Kingdom. In June of that year, the United States Senate denied him confirmation by a vote of 23 to 22. Jackson's opponents in Congress argued that Jackson had offered Stevenson the appointment in 1833, and that when Congress convened later that year, Stevenson had organized the House, including committee assignments and chairmanships, in accordance with Jackson's preferences. In the Anti-Jacksonian view, this amounted to a quid pro quo that allowed executive branch interference with the prerogatives of the legislative branch. Following his denial by the Senate, he returned to Virginia and resumed the practice of law and in addition, he presided over the 1835 Democratic National Convention.

In February 1836, President Andrew Jackson renominated Stevenson for Minister to the United Kingdom. The second time around, he was confirmed 26 votes to 19, and served from 1836 to 1841.

His term as Minister to the United Kingdom was marked by controversy: the abolitionist cause was growing in strength, and some sections of public opinion resented the choice of Stevenson, who was a slaveowner, for this role. The Irish statesman Daniel O'Connell was reported to have denounced Stevenson in public as a slave breeder, generally thought to be a more serious matter than simply being a slaveowner. Stevenson, outraged, challenged O'Connell to a duel, but O'Connell, who had a lifelong aversion to dueling, refused, and suggested that he had been misquoted. The controversy became public and the repeated references to slave breeding caused Stevenson a good deal of embarrassment; there was a widespread view that if O'Connell's charges were false Stevenson would have done better to simply ignore them rather than engaging in a public squabble.

=== Later life ===
In 1846, Stevenson purchased the Blenheim estate in Albemarle County, Virginia. In the 1850 U.S. Federal Census, the last of his lifetime, Stevenson owned 63 enslaved people in Albemarle County. He had owned eight enslaved people in Richmond during the 1820 federal census, and 1830 federal census.

Stevenson presided over the 1848 Democratic National Convention. In 1845 he was elected to the board of visitors of the University of Virginia, and from 1856 to 1857, he served as the university's rector.

== Personal life ==
Stevenson married three times. In 1809, he married Mary Page White, a granddaughter of Carter Braxton, a signer of the Declaration of Independence. She died during childbirth in 1812, giving birth to:

- John White Stevenson (1812–1886), a Congressman, U.S. Senator, and who also served as Governor of Kentucky after the American Civil War. During his father's lifetime, he married Sibella Winston (1823–1904) in 1843. The marriage produced five children (this man's grandchildren): Sally C. (Stevenson) Colston, Mary W. (Stevenson) Colston, Judith W. (Stevenson) Winslow, Samuel W. Stevenson, and John W. Stevenson. (Note: Morton gives both Mary and John Stevenson's middle initials as "D." instead of "W." She also omits Samuel W. Stevenson from the list of children, including instead Andrew Stevenson of Philadelphia, Pennsylvania. She later writes that his son John White Stevenson was survived by six children, despite having previously listed only five names. Vaux (p. 14) lists sons Andrew and John, although he states that Andrew lives in Montana. Vaux also mentions three unnamed daughters.)

In 1816, Stevenson married his second wife, Sarah "Sally" Coles (1789–1848), who was a cousin of Dolley Madison and a sister of Edward Coles, who served as Governor of Illinois. She died in 1848. In 1849, he married for the third and final time to Mary Schaff.

== Death and legacy ==
Stevenson died at his Blenheim estate on January 25, 1857. He was buried at Enniscorthy Cemetery in Keene, Virginia. His firstborn son, John White Stevenson, followed his father's career path into law and politics, serving as Congressman during his father's lifetime, then as Governor of Kentucky following the American Civil War and later as U.S. Senator.

Stevenson's manor house, Blenheim, remains today, having been listed on the National Register of Historic Places in 1976.

== Notes ==
U.S. House of Representatives
Preceded by John Tyler	Member of the U.S. House of Representatives from Virginia's 23rd congressional district March 4, 1821 – March 3, 1823 (obsolete district)	Succeeded by (none)
Preceded by William L. Ball	Member of the U.S. House of Representatives from Virginia's 9th congressional district March 4, 1823 – March 3, 1833	Succeeded by William P. Taylor
Preceded by John M. Patton	Member of the U.S. House of Representatives from Virginia's 11th congressional district March 4, 1833 – June 2, 1834	Succeeded by John Robertson
Political offices
Preceded by John W. Taylor	Speaker of the U.S. House of Representatives; December 3, 1827 – March 3, 1829; December 7, 1829 – March 3, 1831; December 5, 1831 – March 3, 1833; December 2, 1833 – June 2, 1834	Succeeded by John Bell
Diplomatic posts
Preceded by Aaron Vail (Chargé d'Affaires)	U.S. Minister to Britain; 1836–1841	Succeeded by Edward Everett
