= French's Tavern =

Historic house in Virginia, United States

- U.S. National Register of Historic Places
- Virginia Landmarks Register
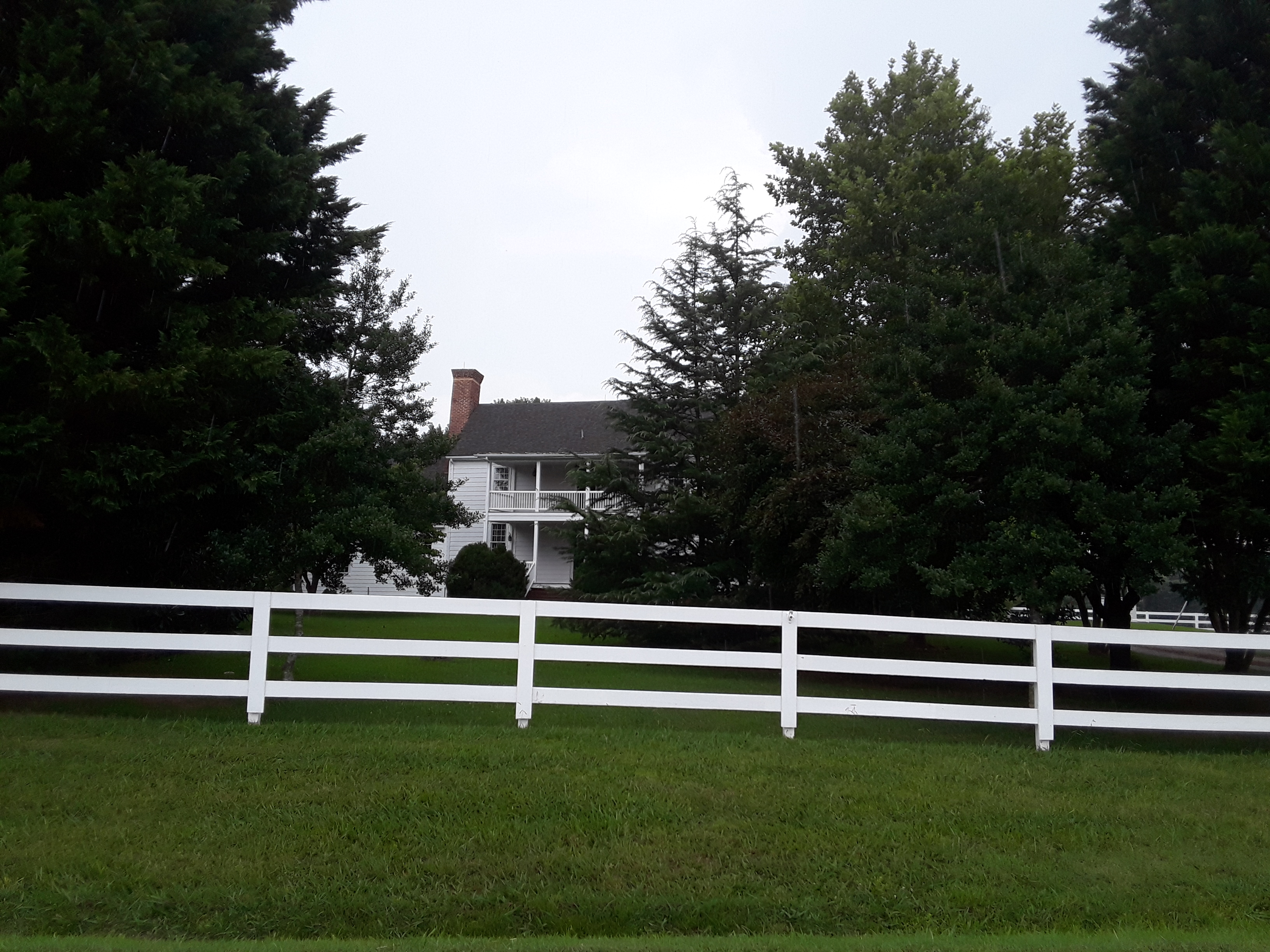

- Location within Virginia Location within the United States
- Location: 6100 Old Buckingham Rd., near Ballsville, Virginia
- Coordinates: 37°29′34″N 78°04′58″W
- Area: 120 acres (49 ha)
- Built: c. 1730
- NRHP reference No.: 89000293
- VLR No.: 072-0105

Significant dates
- Added to NRHP: April 21, 1989
- Designated VLR: December 13, 1988

French's Tavern, also known as Swan's Creek Plantation, Indian Camp, Harris's Store, and The Coleman Place, is a historic house and tavern located near Ballsville, Powhatan County, Virginia. The two-story, frame building complex is in five distinct sections, with the earliest dated to about 1730. The sections consist of the main block, the wing, the annex, the hyphen and galleries. It was built as the manor home for a large plantation, and operated as an ordinary in the first half of the 19th century.

It was added to the National Register of Historic Places in 1989.
