= 1814 Virginia gubernatorial election =

- November 12, 1814
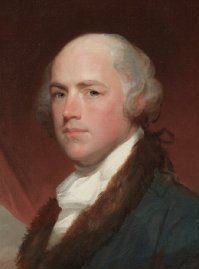

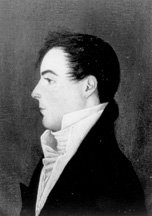

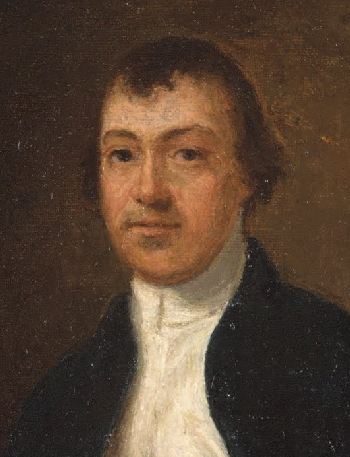
Nominee	Wilson Cary Nicholas	Armistead Thomson Mason	Thomas Mann Randolph Jr.
1st ballot	88	69	35
2nd ballot	102	90	Eliminated
Governor before election
James Barbour
Democratic-Republican
Elected Governor
Wilson Cary Nicholas
Democratic-Republican (Note: Lampi lists no parties for this election. Both Kallenbach and Kallenbach and Sobel and Raimo list Nicholas as a Democratic-Republican during his tenure.)

A gubernatorial election was held in Virginia on November 12, 1814. The former U.S. representative from Virginia's 21st congressional district Wilson Cary Nicholas defeated the brigadier general of the Virginia militia Armistead Thomson Mason and the United States Army colonel Thomas Mann Randolph Jr.

The incumbent governor of Virginia James Barbour was ineligible for re-election due to term limits established by the Constitution of Virginia. The election was conducted by the Virginia General Assembly in joint session. No candidate had a majority after the first ballot, requiring a second round of voting. Nicholas was elected with a majority on the second ballot.

== General election ==
1814 Virginia gubernatorial election
Candidate	First ballot		Second ballot	
Candidate	Count	Percent	Count	Percent
Wilson Cary Nicholas	88	45.83	102	53.12
Armistead Thomson Mason	69	35.94	90	46.88
Thomas Mann Randolph Jr.	35	18.23	—N/a	
Total	192	100.00	192	100.00

== Bibliography ==
- Kallenbach, Joseph E.; Kallenbach, Jessamine S. (1977). American State Governors, 1776–1976. Vol. 1. Dobbs Ferry, NY: Oceana Publications.
- Lampi, Philip J. (2012a). "Virginia 1814 Governor". A New Nation Votes. American Antiquarian Society.
- Lampi, Philip J. (2012b). "Virginia 1814 Governor, Ballot 2". A New Nation Votes. American Antiquarian Society.
- Sobel, Robert; Raimo, John (1978). Biographical Directory of the Governors of the United States 1789–1978. Vol. 4. Westport, CT: Meckler Books.
