= Blenheim (ship) =

A number of sailing ships have been named Blenheim:

- Blenheim (1704), a 260-ton merchant ship built in Deptford in 1704 for the East India Company. The ship was attacked by the French ship Duguay-Trouin and blown up in 1714.
- Blenheim (1783 ship) may have been launched in 1776 in Philadelphia as Britannia. By 1777 she was the Massachusetts-based privateer American Tartar and had taken several prizes. She had also participated in an inconclusive single-ship action with a British merchantman. The British Royal Navy captured American Tartar late in 1777 and she became HMS Hinchinbrook. The Royal Navy sold her in 1783 and she became the West Indiaman Blenheim. In 1785-86 she became a Greenland whaler and she continued in that trade until two French frigates captured and burnt her in 1806.
- Blenheim (1790 ship) was launched as a West Indiaman and spent almost all of her career as a West Indiaman. In 1818 she made one voyage to Bengal under a license from the British East India Company (EIC). On her return from Bengal, she reverted to the West Indies trade. Later she traded between London and Quebec and was last listed in 1837.
- Blenheim was launched in 1804 but the Royal Navy purchased her almost immediately. She served as HMS Cormorant until the Navy sold her in 1817. She became the West Indiaman Blenheim, and disappeared, presumed foundered, in 1821.
- Blenheim (1834 ship), a 357-ton merchant ship built in Jarrow in 1834. The ship was used to transport convicts to Port Jackson in 1834 and 1839 and Hobart Town in 1837.
- Blenheim (1845 ship), an 808-ton merchant ship built by the Middle Dock Co. in West Holborn, South Shields, that transported convicts to Hobart Town in 1849 and 1850. She foundered in 1859.
- Blenheim (1848 ship), of 1,848 GRT, was a sailing ship built by T.& W. Smith at St Peter's Yard, St. Peter's, Newcastle upon Tyne. In 1867 a cyclone dismasted her as she sailed from Madras to Calcutta. It was not cost-effective to repair her, so her owners sold her to the Indian government, which used her as a coal hulk in the Nicobar Islands.

== See also ==
- HMS Blenheim
