= Blenheim, Virginia =

Unincorporated community in Virginia, United States

Blenheim
- Unincorporated community
- Location within the state of Virginia Blenheim (the United States)
- Coordinates: 37°54′13″N 78°29′18″W
- Country: United States
- State: Virginia
- County: Albemarle
- Time zone: UTC−5 (Eastern (EST))
  - Summer (DST): UTC−4 (EDT)
- GNIS feature ID: 1477123

Blenheim is an unincorporated community in Albemarle County, Virginia, United States.

Blenheim, the home of politician and diplomat Andrew Stephenson was added to the National Register of Historic Places in 1976.

Another historic site, Historic Blenheim, is located considerably north in Fairfax County.
