= George Nicholas (politician) =

American politician

Member of the Virginia House of Delegates from Albemarle County
- In office October 16, 1786 – June 23, 1788 Serving with John Nicholas, Edward Carter
- Preceded by: Thomas Walker
- Succeeded by: Wilson Cary Nicholas
- In office May 5, 1783 – May 2, 1784 Serving with Edward Carter
- Preceded by: Thomas Walker
- Succeeded by: Wilson Cary Nicholas

Member of the Virginia House of Delegates from Hanover County
- In office May 7, 1781 – May, 1782 Serving with John Syme
- Preceded by: Parke Goodall
- Succeeded by: Parke Goodall

Member of the Virginia House of Delegates from Williamsburg
- In office May 4, 1778 – May 2, 1779
- Preceded by: George Wythe
- Succeeded by: Henry Tazewell

Personal details
- Born: circa 1754 Williamsburg, Colony of Virginia, British America
- Died: July 25, 1799 (aged 45) Lexington, Kentucky, U.S.
- Party: Federalist
- Relations: Robert Carter Nicholas Sr. (Father); Wilson Cary Nicholas, John Nicholas (Brother); Robert C. Nicholas (Nephew); Samuel Smith, Robert Smith (Brother in Law)
- Education: College of William and Mary

George Nicholas (c. 1754 – July 25, 1799) was an American lawyer, planter, patriot, military officer and politician who helped to write the first Kentucky constitution and became the first professor of law at Transylvania University. He also briefly served as Attorney General of Kentucky, and several terms in the Virginia House of Delegates.

== Early and family life ==
Nicholas was born in Williamsburg in the Colony of Virginia in 1754. The firstborn son of prominent lawyer Robert Carter Nicholas Sr. and his wife Ann Cary was born into the First Families of Virginia, and named after an uncle who had served in the House of Burgesses, representing the College of William and Mary. He would have ten siblings (of whom seven reached adulthood). His somewhat younger brother John Nicholas (1756–1820) would serve as a Virginia legislator and U.S. Congressman before moving to New York, and Wilson Cary Nicholas (1761–1820) would serve alongside this man, but remained in Virginia and became its governor (after George's death). Their youngest brother, Philip Norborne Nicholas (1776–1849) would also serve as Virginia's attorney general (from 1800 to 1819) before becoming a Virginia judge. Only their brother Lewis Nicholas (1766–1840) failed to enter politics. Their eldest sister Sarah married John Hatley Norton of Winchester, Elizabeth Carter Nicholas (1753–1810) married Edmund Jennings Randolph (1753–1813) who became Governor of Virginia and U.S. Attorney General. However, their sisters Mary (1759–1796), Judith (b. 1765) and brother Robert (b. 1768) never reached adulthood.

=== Military service ===
A fervent patriot during the American Revolutionary War, Nicholas became a Captain of the 2nd Virginia regiment in October 1775, was promoted to major in the 10th Virginia regiment in November 1776, and lieutenant colonel of the 11th Virginia regiment in September 1777, but resigned that post after two months. However, he spent most of his time in Baltimore (where he courted his wife), and did not lead troops into battle.

=== Marriage and family ===
In 1778 he married Mary Smith of Baltimore, whose sister would marry his brother Wilson Cary Nicholas. His brother in laws Samuel Smith and Robert Smith, would become a Congressman in this man's lifetime (then U.S. Senator) and Secretary of the Navy, respectively. George and Mary Nicholas had at least eight children. Their son Samuel Smith Nicholas became a judge and married Matilda Prather. Three of their sons would have military careers: Capt. Robert Carter Nicholas, Major Cary Nicholas and Captain George Nicholas Jr. Other sons included Smith Nicholas and Nelson Nicholas (1791–1826, the editor of the Kentucky Whig). Their daughter Maria Nicholas married Col. Owings of Kentucky (two of their sons would die in battle), and Ann Nicholas married Lewis Saunders

== Career ==
George Nicholas read law under his father, and represented Williamsburg in the Assembly of 1778, succeeding fellow lawyer George Wythe, who became the first professor of law at the College of William and Mary and may have also helped with this man's legal education during this part-time legislative service. Nicholas would later represent Hanover County (where his father who died in 1780 had been born and owned land) for a single term, then Albemarle County, where he served with his younger brothers Wilson Cary Nicholas and John Nicholas.

In his last Virginia legislative service, George and his brother Wilson Cary Nicholas represented Albemarle County in the ratifying convention of 1788. They favored adoption of the federal Constitution, which was approved. In the 1787 Virginia tax census, Nicholas owned 27 adult slaves and 16 enslaved children, as well as 21 horses and 31 cattle and a four-wheeled phaeton in Albemarle County. A friend and correspondent of James Madison; he became extremely obese, and Madison laughed until he cried at a caricature of Nicholas, during the Virginia convention to ratify the United States Constitution, as a plum pudding with legs.

Soon after helping ensure the federal Constitution's ratification, Nicholas and his family moved to Lexington, Kentucky, where he built a home, and also helped draft the new state's constitution as a member of the constitutional convention of 1792. Nicholas also had a large plantation just outside of Danville, Kentucky. In 1789, President Washington appointed Nicholas as the first United States Attorney for the District of Kentucky. However, Nicholas was a controversial figure and soon stepped down from the role as he could not "accommodate himself fully to the democratic government.". In 1799, Nicholas was appointed the first professor of law at Transylvania University.

== Death and legacy ==
However, Nicholas died suddenly on July 25, 1799. He is buried in the Old Episcopal Burial Ground on Lexington's Third Street.

The city of Nicholasville and Nicholas County were named in his honor. The University of Chicago Special Collections Research Center managed to secure some of his papers among those collected by Reuben T. Durrett.

== Quotes ==
"If the federal government try to reach any supplementally condition to impose upon us, we would be in Virginia exonerated."

== Notes ==
Legal offices
Preceded by new office	Attorney General of Kentucky; 1792	Succeeded by John Breckinridge
