= Robert C. Nicholas =

American politician

Robert Carter Nicholas
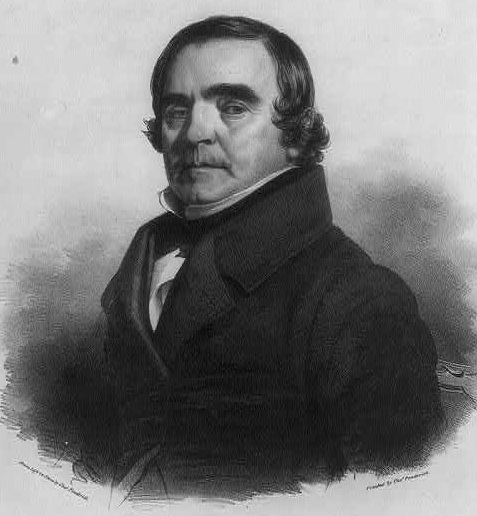

United States Senator from Louisiana
- In office January 13, 1836 – March 3, 1841
- Preceded by: George A. Waggaman
- Succeeded by: Alexander Barrow

Secretary of State of Louisiana
- In office 1845–1845
- Governor: Alexandre Mouton
- Preceded by: Levi Pierce
- Succeeded by: Zenon Ledoux, Jr.

Louisiana Superintendent of Education
- In office 1849–1853
- Preceded by: Alexander Dimitry
- Succeeded by: John N. Carrigan

Personal details
- Born: January 10, 1787 Hanover, Virginia
- Died: December 24, 1856 (aged 69) Terrebonne Parish, Louisiana, U.S.
- Resting place: Saint Louis Cemetery No. 1
- Party: Democratic
- Education: College of William & Mary

Robert Carter Nicholas (January 10, 1787 – December 24, 1856) was a United States senator from Louisiana. He was a veteran of the War of 1812, and also served as Secretary of State of Louisiana and Louisiana's Superintendent of Education.

== Early life and education ==
Born in Hanover, Virginia, on January 10, 1787, he was the son of Revolutionary war veteran and politician George Nicholas (1754–1799) and his wife Mary (Smith) Nicholas (d. 1806). and the grandson of Robert Carter Nicholas (1728–1780)., and named for his late grandfather Robert Carter Nicholas, Sr. In 1816 and 1817 Nicholas attended the College of William & Mary in Williamsburg, Virginia.

== Military service ==
Nicholas joined the United States Army in 1808, receiving a commission as a Captain in the 7th Infantry Regiment. Nicholas was promoted to major in 3rd Infantry Regiment in 1810 and became Lieutenant Colonel of the 1st Infantry Regiment in 1812. He served with his regiment in the War of 1812, including combat at the Battle of Chippewa. After serving with the 30th Infantry, in 1814 he was promoted to colonel, and he commanded the 8th Infantry Regiment until resigning his commission in 1819.

== Career ==
After his military service, Nicholas relocated to Kentucky, and in 1821 received an appointment as U.S. Indian Agent to the Chickasaw Nation.

Nicholas later moved to Louisiana, where he owned a sugarcane plantation in Terrebonne Parish while residing in St. James Parish. He operated that plantation using enslaved labor. In the last federal census in his lifetime, Nicholas owned 236 enslaved people.

Nicholas was elected as a Jacksonian (later a Democrat) to the U.S. Senate to fill the vacancy caused by the resignation of Senator-elect Charles E.A. Gayarre, and served from January 13, 1836, to March 3, 1841.

He was Secretary of State of Louisiana in 1845. From 1849 to 1853 he was Louisiana's Superintendent of Education.

== Death and legacy ==
Nicholas died in Terrebonne Parish on December 24, 1856.

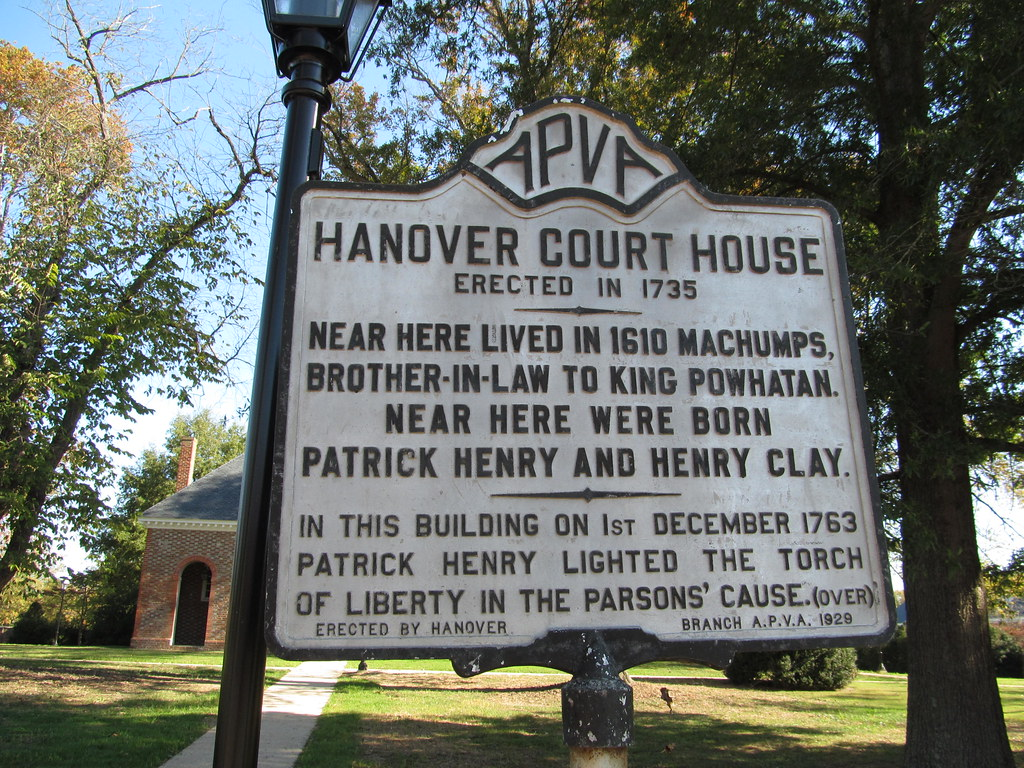
Hanover, VA

== Personal life ==
He married Susan Adelaide Vinson, and their children included a daughter, Mary. Mary Nicholas was the wife of Frederick George Burthe.

Nicholas was a nephew of John Nicholas, a U.S. Representative from Virginia and Wilson Cary Nicholas, a Senator from Virginia.

Political offices
Preceded by Levi Pierce	Secretary of State of Louisiana; 1845	Succeeded by Zenon Ledoux, Jr.
U.S. Senate
Preceded by George A. Waggaman	U.S. senator (Class 2) from Louisiana; 1836–1841; Served alongside: Alexander Porter, Alexandre Mouton	Succeeded by Alexander Barrow
