= Ballsville, Virginia =

Ballsville
- unincorporated community
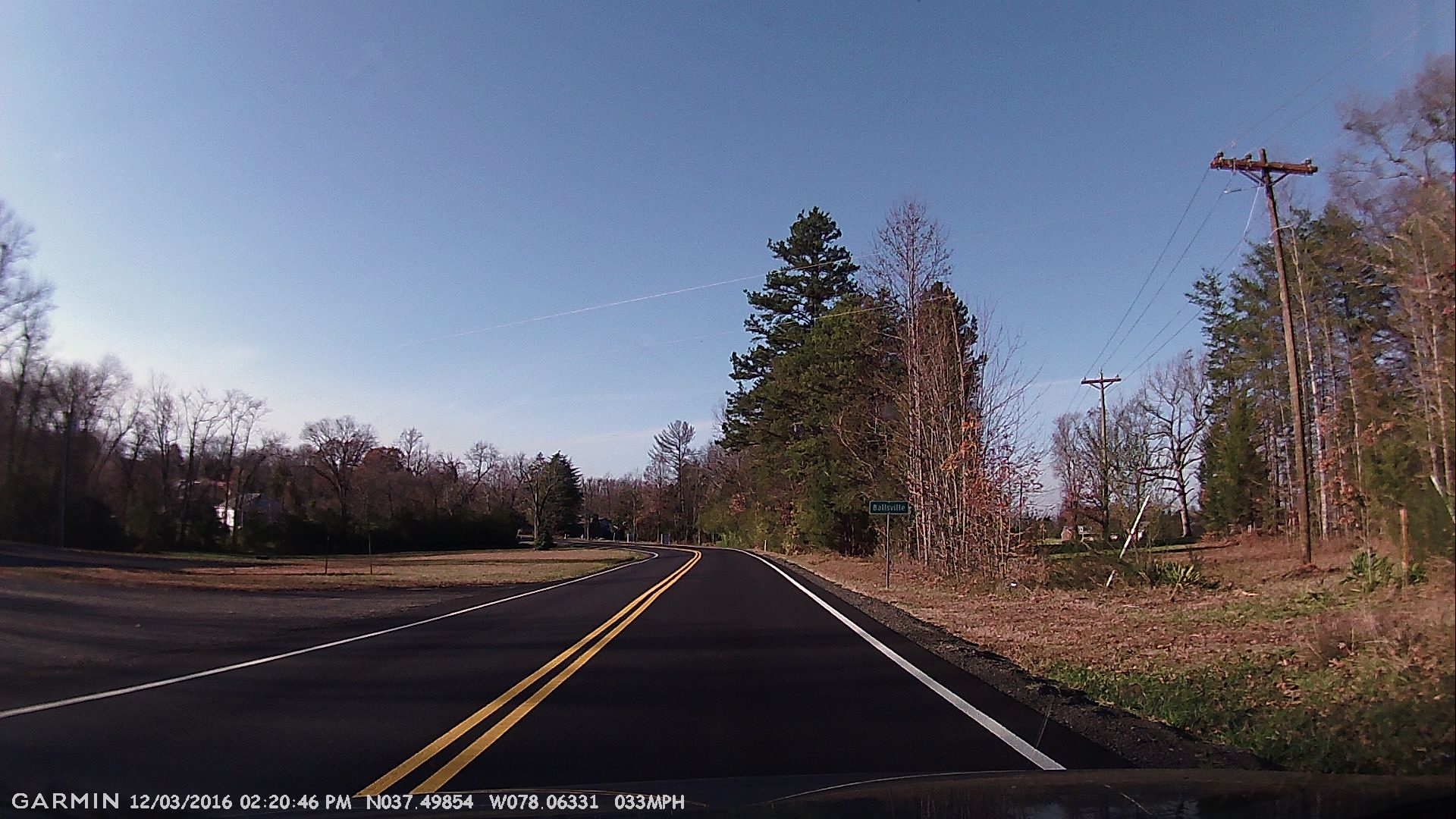

- Location within the state of Virginia Ballsville (the United States)
- Coordinates: 37°29′55″N 78°04′01″W
- Country: United States
- State: Virginia
- County: Powhatan
- Time zone: UTC−5 (Eastern (EST))
  - Summer (DST): UTC−4 (EDT)
- GNIS feature ID: 1462755

Ballsville is an unincorporated community in Powhatan County, Virginia, United States. The community is located approximately forty miles due west of Richmond. It is on Virginia State Route 13 between Powhatan and Cumberland.

It is not to be confused with the fictional town of Ballsville found at ballsville.com, which was a publicity stunt for the band Korn, debuted in conjunction with the music video for their song "Hold On".

Blenheim and French's Tavern and the Allen's are listed on the National Register of Historic Places. Ballsville, Virginia was a stop on the Farmville and Powhatan Railroad from 1884 to 1905 and then on the Tidewater and Western Railroad from 1905 to 1917.
