= An Act further to protect the commerce of the United States =

Law authorizing the quasi-war with France

- Enacted by: the 5th United States Congress
- Effective: July 9, 1798

Citations
- Statutes at Large: 1 Stat. 578

Legislative history
- Passed the House of Representatives on July 3, 1798 (Voice vote); Passed the Senate on July 6, 1798 (18-4); Signed into law by President John Adams on July 9, 1798

An Act further to protect the commerce of the United States, (5th Congress, Sess. 2, ch. 68, 1 Stat. 578) is an act of Congress approved July 9, 1798, authorizing the President of the United States to use military force in the Quasi-War with France.

== Legislative history ==
On June 28, 1798, a committee appointed to consider President Adams' recommendations to Congress reported a bill further to protect the commerce of the United States which was received and read the first and second time. On July 2, 1798, the bill was amended and engrossed and the next day was read the third time, passed and sent to the Senate for concurrence.

On July 3, 1798, the Senate received the bill from the House and read it the first and second time. On July 6, 1798, the Senate passed the bill by a vote of 18 ayes and 4 nays, with the dissenting votes coming from Joseph Anderson of Tennessee, John Brown of Kentucky, John Langdon of New Hampshire, and Henry Tazewell of Virginia, all Anti-Federalists. The bill was signed into law by President Adams on July 9, 1798.
