= John Nicholas (American politician) =

American politician

Member of the New York Senate from the Western District
- In office 1806-1809

Member of the U.S. House of Representatives from Virginia's 18th district
- In office March 4, 1793 – March 3, 1801
- Preceded by: Position established
- Succeeded by: Philip R. Thompson

Personal details
- Born: January 19, 1764 Williamsburg, Virginia Colony, British America
- Died: December 31, 1819 (aged 55) Geneva, New York, U.S.
- Party: Anti-Administration (1793–95); Democratic-Republican (after 1795)
- Relations: Peter Myndert Dox (grandson)
- Education: College of William & Mary
- Occupation: attorney, farmer, judge

John Nicholas (January 19, 1764 – December 31, 1819) was an American lawyer, farmer, and politician from Williamsburg, Virginia. He represented Virginia in the U.S. House from 1793 to 1801.

== Early life ==
Nicolas was born on January 19, 1764, in Williamsburg, in what was then the Colony of Virginia in British America. He was a son of Judge Robert Carter Nicholas (1729–1780) and Ann (née Cary) Nicholas (1735–1786), a daughter of Wilson Miles Cary, who was from one of Virginia's oldest and wealthiest families. Among his siblings were Kentucky Attorney General George Nicholas (father of U.S. Senator Robert C. Nicholas), and Governor Wilson Cary Nicholas.

After attending the common schools he graduated from the College of William and Mary in Williamsburg, studied law, and was admitted to the bar and practiced in his native county.

== Career ==
Nicolas was elected as an Anti-Administration candidate to the Third Congress and reelected as a Republican to the three succeeding Congresses, serving from March 4, 1793, until March 3, 1801.

In 1798, before the enactment of the Sedition Act, which made it a crime to publish "false, scandalous, and malicious writing" against the government or its officials, Nicholas declared the proposed Act to be unconstitutional. The Act was inconsistent with the freedom of speech protected by the First Amendment, Nicholas said, because the press could be punished for publishing true statements if it were not possible to prove the truth of the statements, which is often the case. In 1799, when Republicans in the House proposed to repeal the Sedition Act, a party line vote resulted in the rejection of the proposal. Nicholas wrote a minority report describing the policy goal of the Act as being related to Great Britain's form of government: "The King is hereditary, and according to the theory of their Government, can do no wrong. Public officers are his representatives, and derive some portion of his inviolability." Nicholas distinguished this form of deferential respect for public officers to the level of respect owed to their American counterparts, who serve the people and can be removed from office during elections.

=== Later life ===
In 1803, Nicholas moved to Geneva, New York, and started a farm. From 1806 until 1809 he served in the New York State Senate and Judge of the Court of Common Pleas from 1806 until his death in 1819.

== Personal life ==
In 1795, he married Anne Rose Lawson (1770–1838), a daughter of Gavin Lawson and Susanna (née Rose) Lawson. Together, they were the parents of:

- Gavin Lawson Nicholas (1791–1874)
- Ann Cary Nicholas (1793–1860), who married Abraham Dox.
- Jane Lawson Nicholas (1799–1855)
- Robert Carter Nicholas (1801–1854), a New York State Senator who married Mary S. Rose, daughter of Congressman Robert S. Rose, in 1827.
- Elizabeth Randolph Nicholas (1804–1820), who died young.
- Sarah Norton Nicholas (1806–1814), who died young.
- Margaret Caroline Nicholas (1808–1851), who married Frederick Baldwin Leonard, son of Timothy Leonard, in 1835.
- Mary Blair Nicholas (1811–1823), who died young.
- John Nicholas (1814–1854), who married Virginia Gallagher in 1839.

He died at home on December 31, 1819, and is buried in the Glenwood Cemetery in Geneva.

U.S. House of Representatives
Preceded by District created	Member of the U.S. House of Representatives from Virginia's 18th congressional district 1793-1801	Succeeded by Philip R. Thompson
