= Henry Tazewell =

American politician (1753–1799)

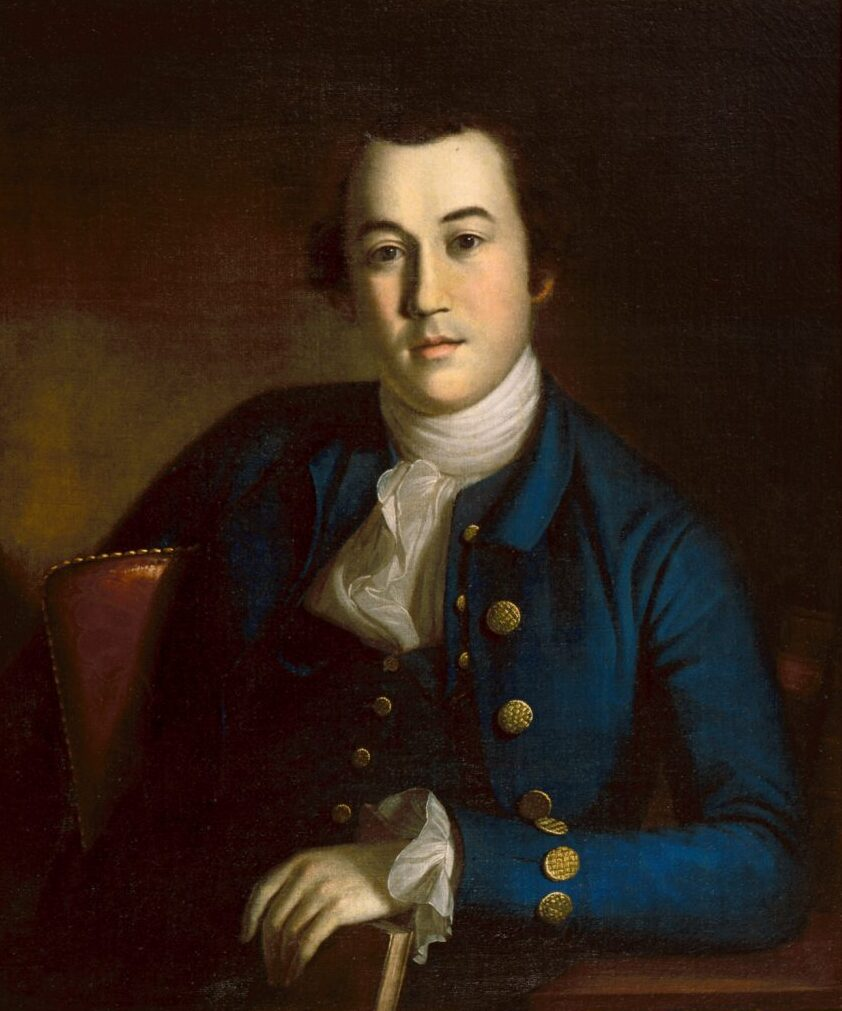
- Portrait by Charles Willson Peale, c. 1774–1775

President pro tempore of the United States Senate
- In office February 20, 1795 – December 8, 1795
- Preceded by: Ralph Izard
- Succeeded by: Samuel Livermore
- In office December 29, 1794 – January 24, 1799
- Preceded by: John Taylor
- Succeeded by: Wilson C. Nicholas

Member of the Virginia Court of Appeals
- In office 1785–1794
- Preceded by: John Blair Jr.

Member of the Virginia House of Delegates from Williamsburg City
- In office October 21, 1782 – March 31, 1785
- In office October 4, 1779 – October 1, 1781

Member of the Virginia House of Delegates from Brunswick County
- In office October 7, 1776 – October 4, 1779

Member of the Virginia House of Burgesses from Brunswick County
- In office June 1, 1775 – May 6, 1776

Personal details
- Born: November 27, 1753 Brunswick County, Virginia, British America
- Died: January 24, 1799 (aged 45) Philadelphia, Pennsylvania, U.S.
- Party: Anti-Administration
- Spouse: Dorothea Elizabeth Waller Tazewell
- Children: Littleton Waller Tazewell; Sophia Ann Tazewell
- Education: College of William & Mary
- Occupation: Lawyer, Politician, Judge
- Profession: Law

Henry Tazewell (November 27, 1753 – January 24, 1799) was an American lawyer, judge and politician who was instrumental in the early government of Virginia, and also served as a US senator. He served as President pro tempore of the United States Senate in 1795. Tazewell County, among other places, is named in his honor.

== Early life ==
Born in Brunswick County, Virginia, Tazewell was the son of the former Mary Gray (1733–1808), and her first husband Littleton Tazewell (1727–1757), the clerk of Brunswick County from 1751 until his death. His mother was descended from Thomas Gray, an "ancient planter" who had emigrated to the Virginia colony before 1616. His mother remarried to the Rev. William Fanning (1728–1782), who attended to the boy's education. Henry Tazewell graduated from the College of William & Mary at Williamsburg in 1770. He then read law under the guidance of his uncle John Tazewell, who would become clerk of the Virginia House of Delegates in its first two sessions (1776 and 1777).

== Personal life ==
Henry Tazewell married Dorothea Elizabeth Waller, the daughter of prominent Williamsburg lawyer Benjamin Waller, on January 13, 1774. Two of their children survived this man and married within the First Families of Virginia. Their son Littleton Waller Tazewell, who had actually been raised by his grandfather Waller during the Revolutionary War, graduated from the College of William & Mary in 1791 and (after studying law in Richmond and receiving his law license) began his legal practice in Williamsburg. By 1798 Littleton Waller had begun following his father's path of public service in the Virginia House of Delegates, and eventually became a senator and governor of Virginia. Their daughter Sophia Ann (like her brother) received a legacy from their grandfather Waller. In 1795 she married Benjamin Taliaferro, who was named one of the executors of this man's will (alongside her brother and this man's friend Richard Cocke of Isle of Wight County who also owned four plantations in Brunswick County before moving to Tennessee and became a Senator in 1799). However, Taliaferro died in 1801. In 1804, the widowed Sophia Ann married Larkin Smith (as his second wife). Smith served as a captain during the Revolutionary War and became the speaker of the Virginia House of Delegate.

== Career ==
Coat of Arms of Henry Tazewell

Tazewell was admitted to the bar in 1773, and began his practice. During the American Revolutionary War, he raised and was commissioned captain of a troop of cavalry.

Brunswick County voters elected Tazewell as one of their representatives to the House of Burgesses in 1775, where he replaced Thomas Stith and served with Frederick Maclin. They elected Maclin and Tazewell to each of the five Virginia Revolutionary Conventions (Thomas Stith also serving with the pair in the First Virginia Convention), and then the first two sessions of the Virginia House of Delegates, but in 1778 Joseph Peebles replaced Maclin as Brunswick's other delegate. Tazewell was a member of the legislative committee that prepared the Virginia Declaration of Rights, as well as drafted the new state's first state constitution.

In 1775, Governor Patrick Henry appointed Tazewell and William Langhorne to number in sequence all treasury notes which the colony issued to finance the war, fearing counterfeiters. That fear proved warranted, for in June 1776, Governor Nash of North Carolina helped capture several counterfeiters spreading bogus money in both states, and in late 1778 information from a slave named Kitt led to the discovery of another ring based in Brunswick and Dinwiddie Counties, so that rewards were offered for twelve named men (four from Brunswick County) and in 1779 the General Assembly passed special legislation awarding Kitt his freedom.

From 1779 to 1785, Tazewell was a member of the Virginia House of Delegates from Williamsburg, where he had moved, succeeding fellow lawyer George Nicholas (who previously had succeeded prominent lawyer and patriot George Wythe who had moved to Richmond, then Nicholas moved to Hanover County). Former Virginia Attorney General and captain of Williamsburg's volunteers in the Revolutionary War James Innes succeeded Tazewell when legislators elected him a judge of the Virginia General Court in 1785.

Elevated to chief judge of that court by his colleagues, Tazewell served from 1789 to 1793. When Virginia legislators reorganized the court in 1793, Tazewell became a judge on what was named the "Supreme Court of Appeals," which after further reorganization later became the Virginia Supreme Court.

In 1794, legislators elected Tazewell to the U.S. Senate to fill the vacancy that had been caused by the resignation of John Taylor. Tazewell may be best known for leading the opposition to John Jay's treaty with England. Re-elected in 1798, Tazewell served from December 29, 1794, until his death in Philadelphia in 1799. Fellow Senators selected him as the president pro tempore of the Senate in 1795.

When Tennessee Senator William Blount was impeached on account of treason in 1797, Tazewell cast the lone dissenting vote against Blount's expulsion from the Senate. Tazewell was one of four senators to vote against authorizing military force for the Quasi-War.

Tazewell owned slaves, and may have leased them out, according to Virginia tax records. In 1786, he lived in Williamsburg and paid taxes for owning nine named Negroes (6 adults and three children), as well as four horses and a cow. The following year he owned 15 adult and 13 teenaged slaves (as well as 7 horses and 24 cattle) in Greensville County (between Brunswick County and Williamsburg, tax notations indicating he lived in Williamsburg), and in 1788 he was likely the nonresident owner of ten adult and one teenaged slave in York County outside Williamsburg.

== Death ==
Tazewell died in Philadelphia, Pennsylvania, on January 24, 1799 (during his Senatorial term), and was interred at Christ Church Burial Ground. He had written his last will and testament in 1797, which was admitted to probate in James City County (one of the two counties which Williamsburg straddles) on April 8, 1799. He had named his son Littleton Tazewell, son-in-law Benjamin Taliaferro and friend Richard Cocke of Isle of Wight County as his executors, and the local court noted John Ambler and Benjamin Carter Waller became sureties for the proper performance of their duties. Tazewell' will named no enslaved people, merely gave instructions for paying a bequest to his daughter Sophia (Benjamin Taliaferro's wife) conditioned upon her renouncing further claims to the estate of her grandfather Waller, and bequeathed the remainder after paying debts, to his son Littleton Tazewell. Although James City County records were later destroyed, the Library of Virginia (the state archives) makes it available online.

Tazewell County, Virginia; Tazewell, Virginia; Tazewell, Tennessee; New Tazewell, Tennessee; and possibly Tazewell County, Illinois are named after him.

== See also ==
- List of members of the United States Congress who died in office (1790–1899)

U.S. Senate
Preceded by John Taylor	U.S. senator (Class 2) from Virginia; 1794–1799; Served alongside: Stevens T. Mason	Succeeded by Wilson C. Nicholas
Political offices
Preceded by Ralph Izard	President pro tempore of the United States Senate; 1795	Succeeded by Samuel Livermore
