= HMS Blenheim =

Five ships of the Royal Navy have been named HMS Blenheim, after the Battle of Blenheim in 1704. The name was chosen for a sixth ship, but was not used.

- HMS Blenheim was a 90-gun second rate launched in 1679 as HMS Duchess. She was renamed HMS Princess Anne in 1701, HMS Windsor Castle in 1702, and HMS Blenheim in 1706. She was broken up in 1763.
- HMS Blenheim (1761) was a 90-gun second rate launched in 1761, reduced to a third rate in 1800 and wrecked in 1807.
- HMS Blenheim was the name the Navy initially selected for the Danish HMS Christian VII, captured in 1807, but the name was not used.
- HMS Blenheim (1813) was a 74-gun third rate launched in 1813. She was reduced to harbour service in 1831, converted to screw propulsion in 1847 and was broken up in 1865.
- HMS Blenheim (1890) was a Blake-class armoured cruiser launched in 1890, used as a depot ship from 1907 and scrapped in 1926.
- HMS Blenheim (F221) was a depot ship, previously SS Achilles. She was purchased in 1940 and scrapped in 1948.
