= Blenheim (Ballsville, Virginia) =

Historic house in Virginia, United States

- U.S. National Register of Historic Places
- Virginia Landmarks Register
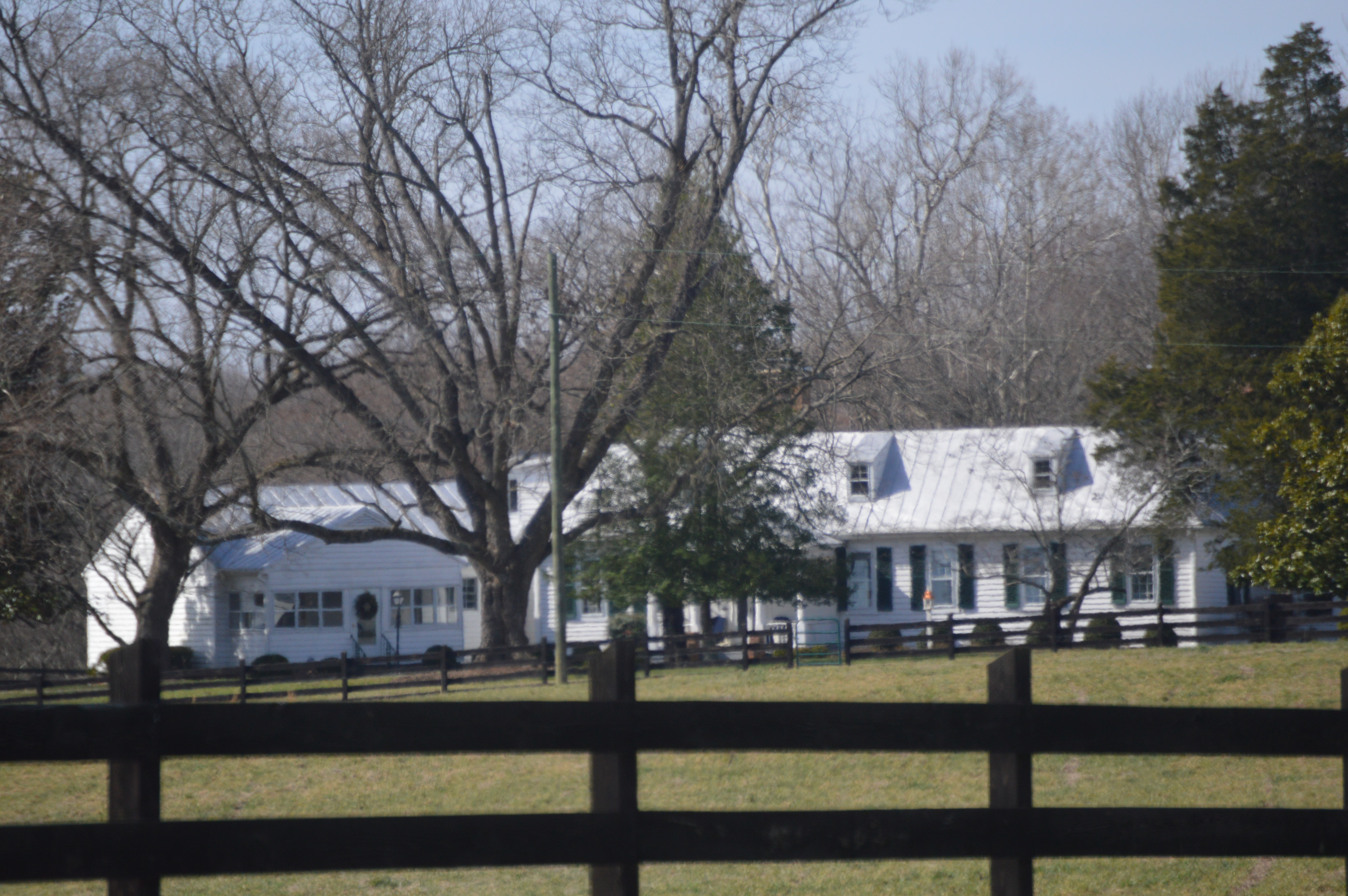
- Distant view from Blenheim Road

- Location within Virginia Location within the United States
- Location: 6177 Blenheim Rd., near Ballsville, Virginia
- Coordinates: 37°30′49″N 78°5′4″W
- Area: 5 acres (2.0 ha)
- Built: c. 1750-1799, 1803-1806, 1830s
- NRHP reference No.: 86003475
- VLR No.: 072-0003

Significant dates
- Added to NRHP: December 11, 1986
- Designated VLR: July 15, 1986

Blenheim is a historic home located near Ballsville, Powhatan County, Virginia. It is a 1 1/2-story, U-shaped vernacular frame dwelling. The earliest section is dated to the 18th century, with the two 19th-century wings, dating to 1803–06 and the mid-1830s. Three minor 20th-century additions have also been constructed. Also on the property is a contributing smokehouse.

It was added to the National Register of Historic Places in 1986.
