= Blenheim (Spring Mills, Virginia) =

Historic house in Virginia, United States

- U.S. National Register of Historic Places
- Virginia Landmarks Register
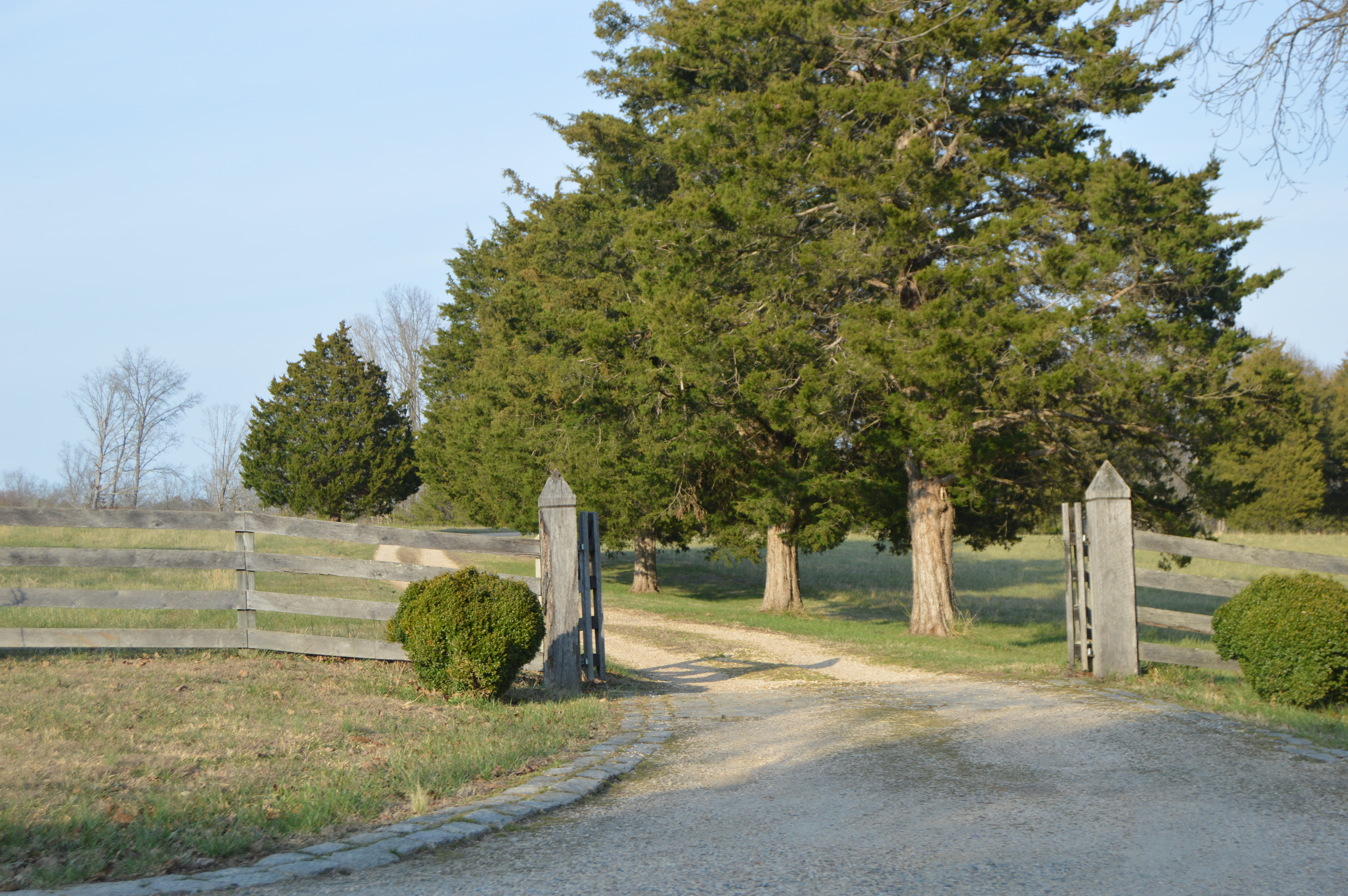
- Entrance to the property

- Location within Virginia Location within the United States
- Location: 2.4 mi. SW of Spring Mills, near Spring Mills, Virginia
- Coordinates: 37°13′15″N 78°57′7″W
- Area: 334 acres (135 ha)
- Built: c. 1828
- Architectural style: Central-passage I
- NRHP reference No.: 79003033, 94000457 (Boundary Increase)
- VLR No.: 015-0066

Significant dates
- Added to NRHP: May 31, 1979, May 26, 1994 (Boundary Increase)
- Designated VLR: February 15, 1977, March 10, 1994

Blenheim is a historic home located near Spring Mills, in Campbell County, Virginia. It was built about 1828, and is a 1 1/2-story, five-bay, single-pile, frame I-house dwelling on a brick basement. It is sheathed with beaded weatherboards and covered with a standing-seam sheet metal roof broken by three pedimented dormers. The interior features elaborate, provincially conceived but skillfully executed, woodwork. Also on the property is a contributing late-19th century frame stable.

It was listed on the National Register of Historic Places in 1979, with a boundary increase in 1994.
