= Historic Blenheim =

Historic house in Virginia, United States

- U.S. National Register of Historic Places
- Virginia Landmarks Register
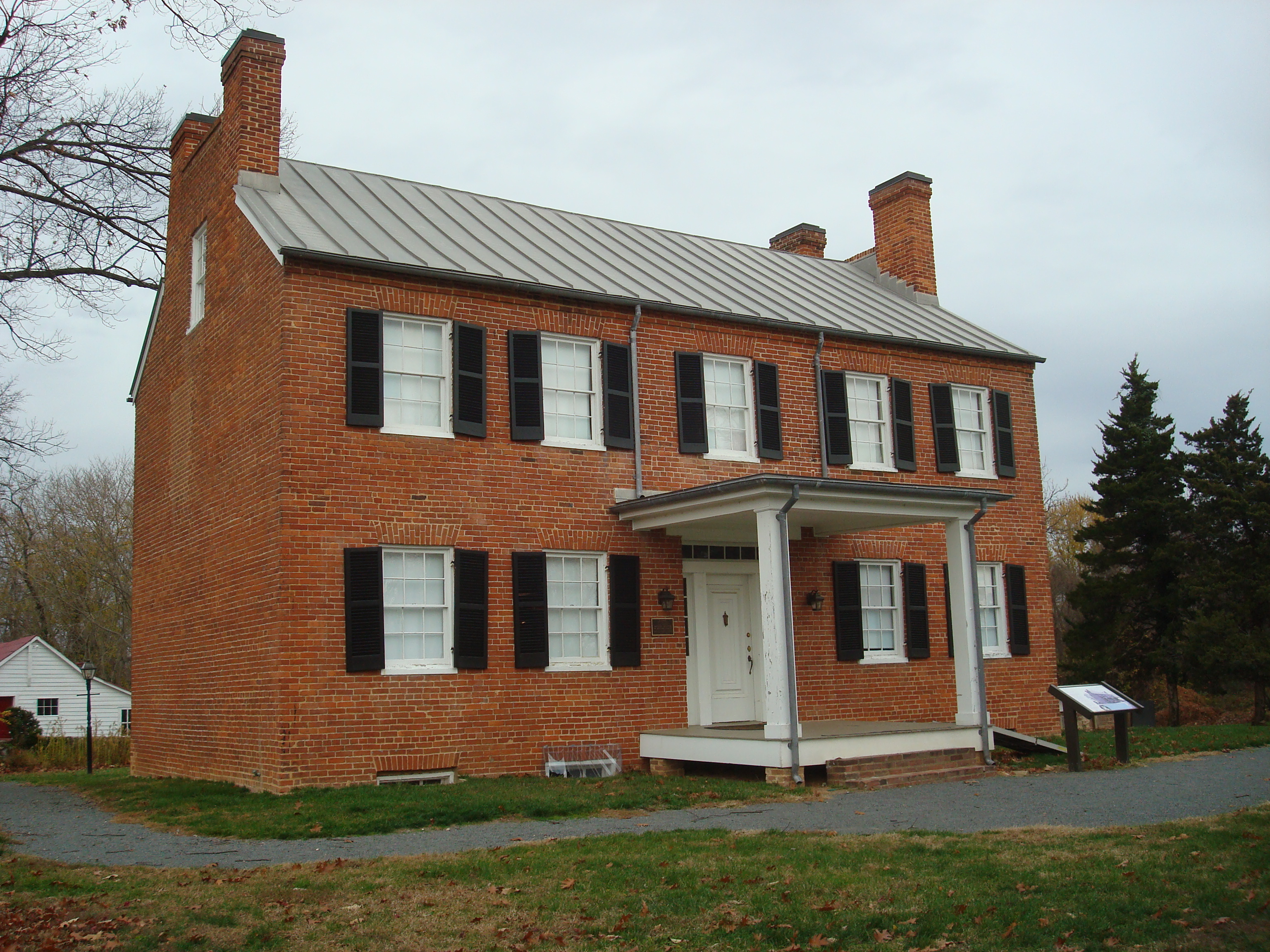
- Blenheim (Willcoxon Farm)

- Location within Fairfax Location within Northern Virginia Location within Virginia Location within the United States
- Location: 3610 Blenheim Boulevard; Fairfax, Virginia
- Coordinates: 38°51′18.94″N 77°17′34.06″W
- Built: c. 1859
- NRHP reference No.: 01000152
- VLR No.: 151-5003
- Designated VLR: December 6, 2000

Historic Blenheim is a c. 1859 brick farm house designed in the Greek Revival style and located in City of Fairfax, Virginia. During the American Civil War, Union soldiers were often encamped on the grounds surrounding the house and utilized it as part of a reserve hospital system. As a result, more than 115 of these soldiers inscribed words and pictures on the first and second floor walls, as well as the attic of the house. Blenheim was added to the National Register of Historic Places in 2001.

== Early history ==
The original owner of the land on which the Blenheim estate is currently located was Captain Rezin Samuel Willcoxon, a veteran of the War of 1812 who, in the early nineteenth century, began to accumulate much land in what is present-day Fairfax, Virginia. At one point, Willcoxon owned over one-thousand acres of land in the area. Rezin married his first wife, Elizabeth DeNeale, in 1805. The couple would have ten children. Elizabeth died in 1845, but in 1851 Willcoxon remarried. His new bride was Fanny Halley Bell.

During the year 1850, according to the U.S. Agricultural Census, Rezin Willcoxon was farming approximately 400 acres of the land he owned. His livestock was estimated to be worth $899, and his farm produced wheat, Indian corn, and Irish potatoes. In April 1854, Rezin's son, Albert T. purchased a large tract of land from his father. It is assumed at this point he had taken over operation of the family farm and had established residency at the farmhouse on the property. According to the Alexandria Gazette and Virginia Advertiser, fire destroyed the farmhouse early in 1855, and evidence suggests the house which stands on the property today was built to replace it. Since the brick bonding for each of the exterior walls is not consistent with the foundation, the new house may have been built on the foundation of the previous house.

When Rezin died in 1855, his property was split among some of his children, but Albert remained in possession of the Willcoxon house and much of the remaining property. On April 20, 1858, Albert married Mary Hunter Eskridge and the couple continued to run the farm, with the help of at least six slaves. Little information is known about them, however. There is a chance that Albert and Mary inherited some of their slaves or received them as wedding gifts from their parents. The names of only three of the slaves are known for certain. Records show that Albert purchased a young man named Charles in 1856. In 1859 he purchased, from his sister, another man named Hanson, who had been in the Willcoxon family since 1806. There are also records of a woman, Maria, whom Albert sold to his sister-in-law, Isabelle K. Eskridge, in 1859. There were most likely two slave quarters on the property.

== The Civil War years ==
Albert and his wife were supporters of secession and supported the Confederate cause by selling Confederate soldiers large quantities of supplies. Some of the items Albert sold during the early war years were beef, hay, blacksmith supplies, horses and pork. By October 1862, however, Fairfax was controlled mainly by the Union army, which ravaged the area and depleted much of the landscape. The Willcoxon estate suffered from this. At some point in 1862, Albert, his wife, and their two children left the area. Since Mary's family was from Leesburg, in Loudoun County, VA, it is possible that the couple and their two children stayed there until the end of the war.

=== Military significance of Fairfax and Blenheim ===
Due to its proximity to the nation's capital, Fairfax was important to the defense of Washington, D.C. Since Blenheim is located at the edge of Fairfax, the Willcoxon family's land was in the middle of wartime activity in the town. Not long after the start of the war, a Confederate force of around 300 men guarded the town. On June 1, 1861, a Union cavalry unit advanced on the town and attacked the Confederate force. Despite the fact that the Confederates were poorly equipped and were not warned of the Union advance, they held off the Northern troops and retained possession of the town. During the skirmish, however, the war saw its first Confederate officer killed.

On July 17, 1861, a Union officer reported that Fairfax was now occupied by the Northern Army. By the end of that year, the Army of the Potomac was using the courthouse in Fairfax as army headquarters. Some evidence suggests that Blenheim may have once served as headquarters as well. Between 1861 and 1863 control of the city changed hands numerous times, but by March 1863, it was solidified as a Union stronghold.

=== Union soldiers and Blenheim ===
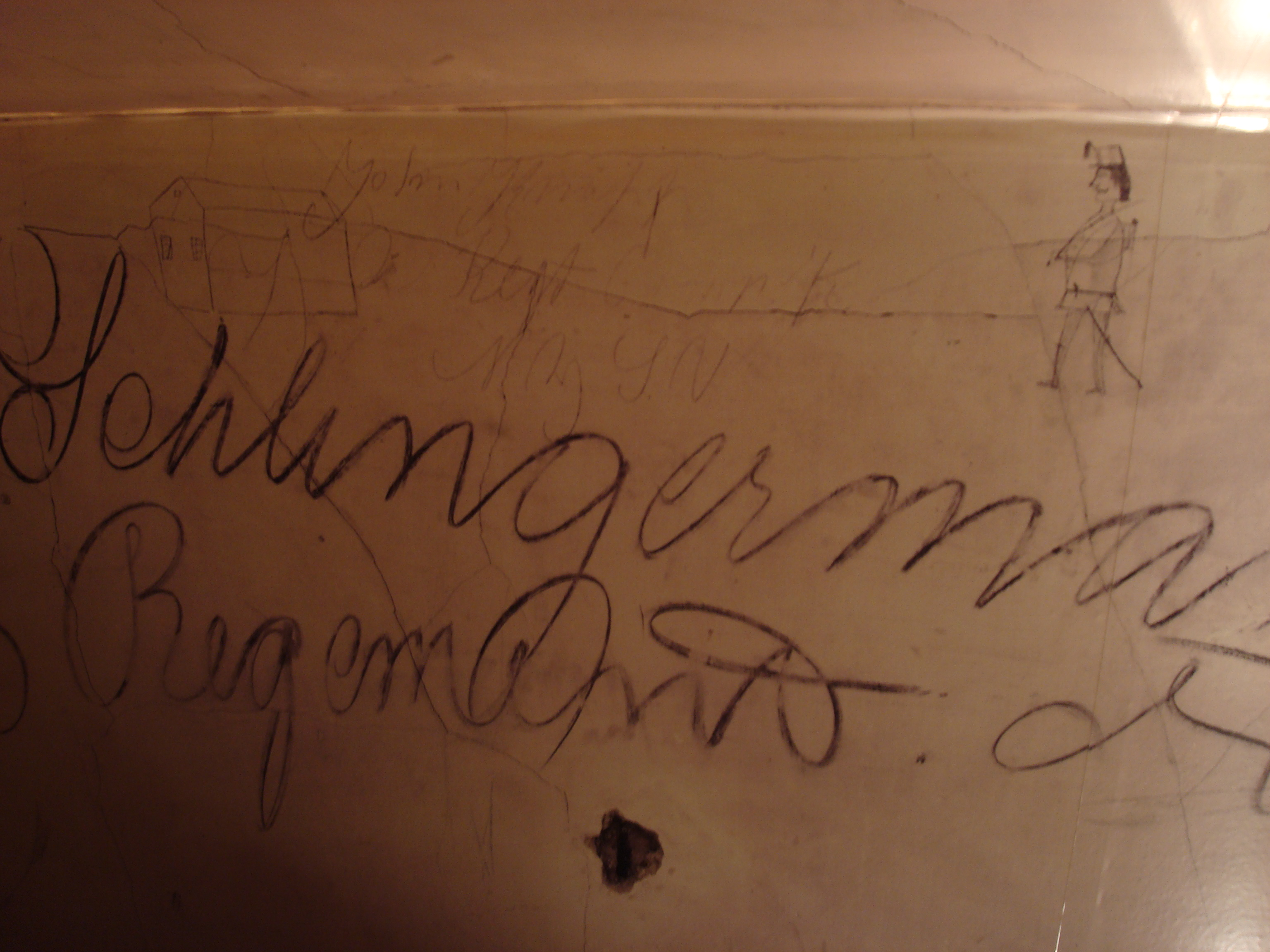
Example of writing and artwork in the attic of Historic Blenheim

Because of Blenheim's location within Fairfax, and its abandonment by its owners, the house eventually became fully occupied by Union soldiers. At various points, the house was most likely used as a hospital for Union soldiers. Union troops not only found refuge in the house, but left their physical mark there as well. Soldiers who stayed at the house left writings on the walls of the first, second, and attic levels. These walls contain over one hundred names, units, dates, poems, and artistic drawings. At least twenty-three different military regiments are represented on the walls, including the 26th Wisconsin Infantry, 83rd Pennsylvania Infantry, 58th New York Infantry, 136th New York Infantry, and the 1st Michigan Cavalry. The earliest writings in the house date to March 1862.

Some of the men who wrote on the walls of Blenheim would later perish at places like 2nd Manassas, Chancellorsville, and Gettysburg. Some of the other inscriptions may have been from men who were wounded during skirmishes right in Fairfax, or who contracted diseases at local encampments.

Research on the Blenheim soldiers began in 1997. Names on the walls were deciphered and checked in basic public resources from the Civil War era and later. Once the name and regiment of a soldier were confirmed, files were pulled from the National Archives and Records Administration. Various historical societies, genealogical groups, state resources, and the internet were also used to reveal the stories of the men of Blenheim.

== Postbellum Blenheim ==
When Albert died in 1889, all his land, which included Willcoxon Place and approximately 367 acres, was split between his children, Harry and Bessie. Harry ran the farm through the start of the twentieth century, and under his leadership the farm prospered. His farm became especially known for its dairy production, and some credited him with providing the best milk in the area. During the year 1903, the earliest use of the name ‘Blenheim’ for Willcoxon Place was recorded in the family obituary for Albert's wife, Mary Eskridge Willcoxon. However, the property continued to be called ‘Willcoxon Place’ throughout the twentieth century.

The 1930s found the farm being run by a tenant farmer. In 1939, Harry willed Blenheim to his niece Marguerite (Daisy), and moved to his other farm in Centreville, VA, where he died in 1942. Farm operations at Blenheim continued through the 1950s. An insurance survey of 1950 listed the farm as having two tenant houses, the main house, a privy, chicken house, pump house, machinery shed and workshop, dairy barn and house, calf house, granary, corn crib, house barn, a second machinery and hay shop, a cow shed, and a hog shed. By 1953, the Willcoxon heirs had begun to sell off large parcels of the farm for development, and soon the original landholdings around Blenheim were reduced to twelve acres. Before her death in 1959 Marguerite (Daisy) had given the estate to her daughter, Barbara Duras, who moved into the house with her husband, William in 1962. Barbara died in 1987, followed by William in 1997. The City of Fairfax purchased the site in January 1999. The family cemetery, located next to the house, includes four generations of the Willcoxon family.

== Today ==
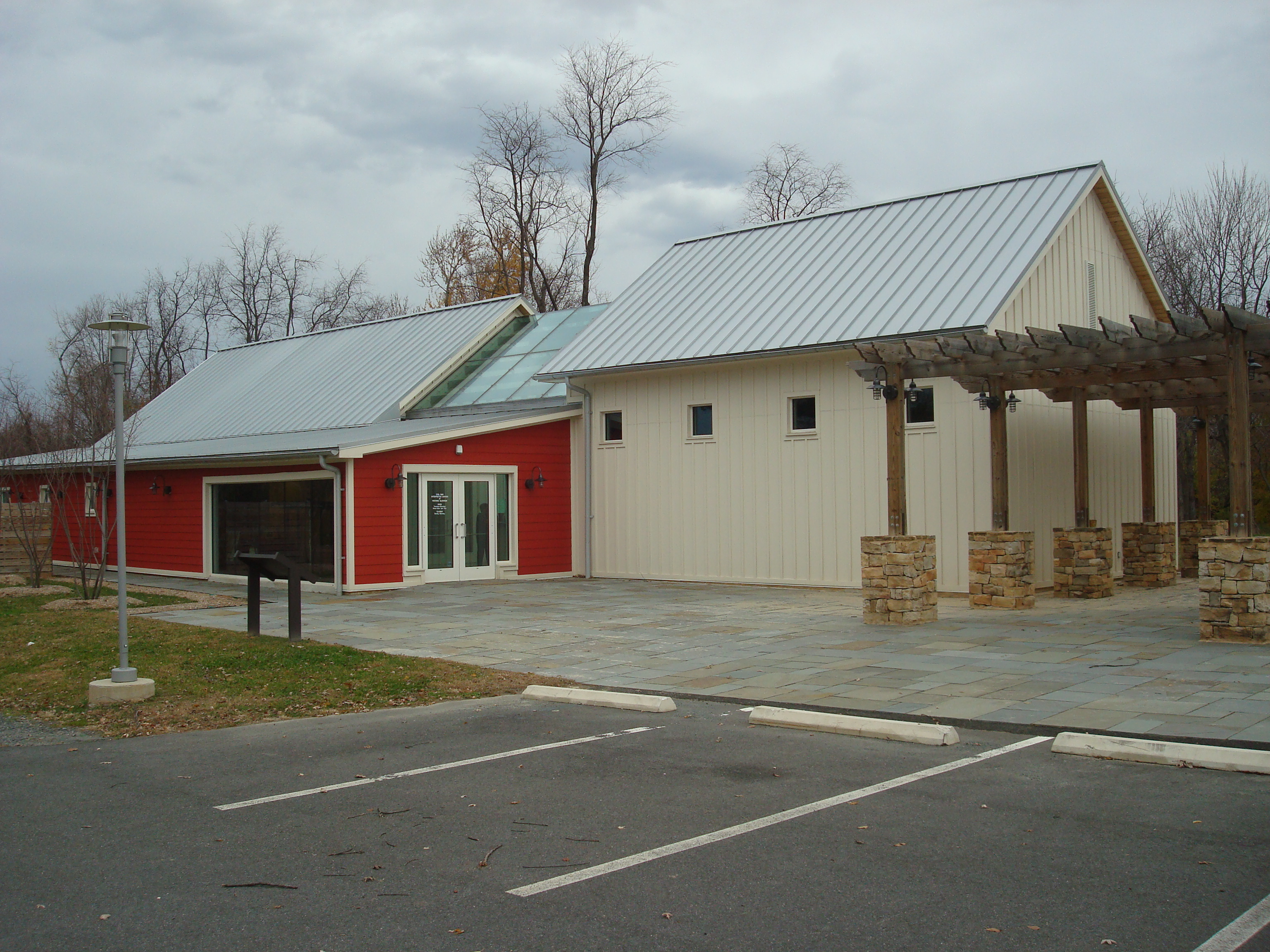
The Civil War Interpretive Center at Historic Blenheim

The Willcoxon family and their descendants never covered the inscriptions in the attic of their home. The attic space was probably used mostly for storage after the war. Many layers of wallpaper were added to the first and second levels of the home through the twentieth century, but the drawings on the walls were never destroyed. Today, the wallpaper on the two main floors has been removed and the inscriptions are visible throughout.

In 2001 Historic Blenheim was added to the National Register of Historic Places. Adjacent to the house is the Civil War Interpretive Center, opened in 2008. The Center's mission is to enhance the educational experience of the site for visitors. A gallery inside the Interpretive Center contains displays which places the Union soldiers who stayed at Blenheim within the larger framework of the American Civil War. Since the second floor and the attic are not accessible by the public, the Center also hosts an exact replica of two-thirds of Blenheim's attic with life-sized images of the inscriptions. Additional features include an assembly room for school groups, tour groups, lectures and special programs, along with temporary exhibits which are displayed on the walls.
