= Philip N. Nicholas =

American jurist (1773–1849)

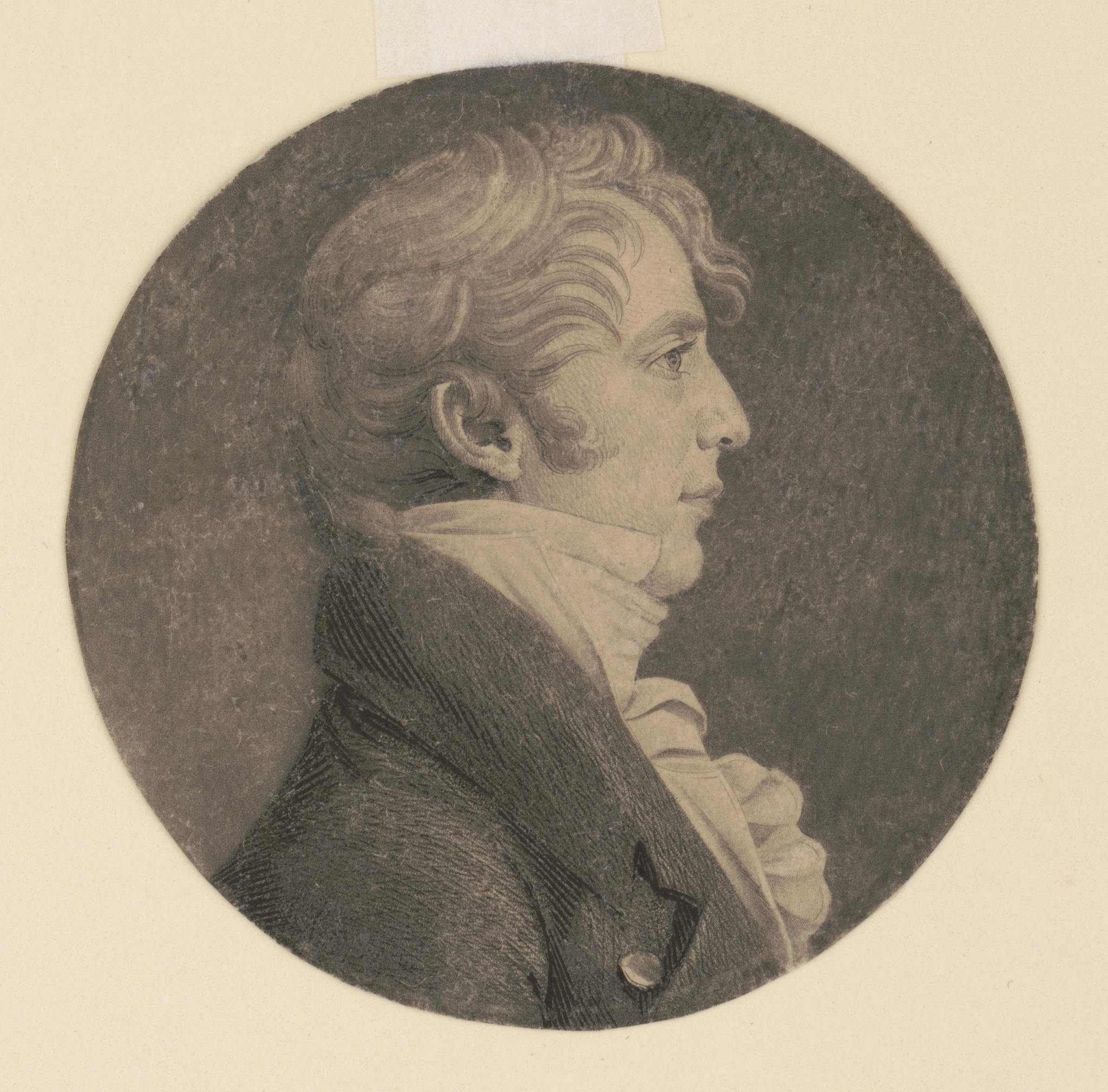
- Born: 1775; Williamsburg, Virginia Colony
- Died: August 18, 1849 (aged 73–74); Richmond Virginia, U.S.
- Education: College of William and Mary
- Occupations: Lawyer, Jurist
- Title: Attorney Generall, Judge

Philip Norborne Nicholas (1775– August 18, 1849) was an American lawyer and jurist from Virginia.

== Early life ==
Educated in the law at the College of William and Mary, Nicholas was appointed by the General Assembly as Attorney General of Virginia in 1794 before his 19th birthday.

== Career ==
The Virginia Capitol at Richmond VA, where 19th century Conventions met

In 1806, while Philip N. Nicholas served as Virginia’s Attorney General, he prosecuted George Wythe Sweeney on the charge of murdering by arsenic poisoning his great uncle George Wythe, the prominent Virginia lawyer and leader in the American Revolution, as well as Wythe's boy servant, Michael. William Wirt and Edmund Randolph defended Sweeney, obtaining an acquittal on the murder charge, but the jury found Sweeney guilty of forging George Wythe’s checks on the Bank of Virginia. The acquittal was based on Virginia law that the testimony of African-Americans that Nicholas had relied upon, could not be used against white men.

Nicholas' career in Richmond included serving as the President of Farmer’s Bank.

In 1823, Philip N. Nicholas was appointed judge to the Virginia General Court, where he served until his death.

From 1809 to 1833, Nicholas served as a Republican Elector in the Electoral College over six presidential elections. He was a member of the ruling Richmond Junto orchestrated by Thomas Ritchie, editor of the Richmond Enquirer.

At the Virginia Constitutional Convention of 1829-1830, Nicholas served as a delegate representing Richmond city from a state senate district including Williamsburg, Charles City, Elizabeth City, James City, Henrico, New Kent, Warwick and York Counties, and the City of Richmond. He served on the Conventions Committee on the Executive Department.

== Death ==
Philip N. Nicholas died in Richmond, Virginia, on August 18, 1849.

== Bibliography ==
- Mumford, George Wythe (1884). "Chancellor Wythe's Death". Encyclopedia Virginia. Virginia Foundation for the Humanities.
- Pulliam, David Loyd (1901). The Constitutional Conventions of Virginia from the foundation of the Commonwealth to the present time. John T. West, Richmond. ISBN 978-1-2879-2059-5.
