= William Radford =

US Navy officer (1809-1890)

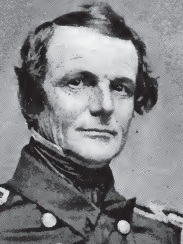
- 1860 daguerreotype
- Born: September 9, 1809; Fincastle, Virginia
- Died: January 8, 1890 (aged 80); Washington, D.C.
- Burial place: Oak Hill Cemetery; Plot: Reno Hill, Lot 916
- Relatives: William Clark; Stephen W. Kearny; Meriwether Lewis Clark, Sr. Sophie Radford de Meissner; William R. Coyle; François E. Matthes; Rosemary Radford Ruether
- Military career
- Allegiance: United States of America
- Branch: United States Navy
- Service years: 1825–1870
- Rank: Rear admiral
- Commands: USS Lexington; USS Dacotah; USS Cumberland; USS New Ironsides; North Atlantic Squadron; European Squadron
- Conflicts: Second Seminole War; Mexican–American War; American Civil War

William Radford (September 9, 1809 – January 8, 1890) was a rear admiral of the United States Navy who served during the Mexican–American War and the American Civil War, in which he remained loyal to the Union, despite his Virginia birth. Radford commanded the Ironclad Division in the attacks on Fort Fisher (December 1864/January 1865) to assert Union control of Cape Fear.

== Ancestry and early life ==
On December 23, 1806, John Radford [May 27, 1785 – April 15, 1817 (aged 31)] married Harriet Kennerly [July 28, 1788 – December 25, 1831 (aged 43)] in Fincastle, Virginia, at Santillane, the estate of her uncle George Hancock. On or after January 5, 1807, William Clark arrived at Greenfield, the estate of army buddy William Preston, missing Harriet's wedding. Instead, Clark asked George Hancock for Julia Hancock's hand in marriage. John and Harriet remained in Fincastle to attend the January 8, 1808, marriage between William and Julia (Harriet's cousin). Then they departed in the spring for Lewis County, Kentucky to live on their 1,000-acre farm between Vanceburg and Concord on the bank of the Ohio River, where William and his two siblings were born.

In 1817, John Radford was killed by the wild boar he was hunting. Widow Harriet moved her three children to join her brothers and first cousin in Saint Louis, Missouri. The Radfords resided with her brother James Kennerly.

Julia Clark succumbed on June 27, 1820. Widower William Clark married Harriet November 28, 1821 in Saint Louis and adopted the Radford children and then added to their combined family:

- Harriet Clark [dates unknown; died as infant].
- Jefferson Kearny Clark [February 29, 1824 – January 10, 1900 (aged 75)]
- Edmund Clark [September 9, 1826 – August 12, 1827 (aged 0)]

After his mother's second marriage, Radford initially refused to move into the Clark house, so he was sent to a school in Perth Amboy, New Jersey, where he became acquainted with the sea. He asked stepfather William Clark for a recommendation to the U.S. Navy. Clark sent a personal request to President John Quincy Adams. Some references state William's birthdate as March 1, 1808, but that date was provided to the Navy so William's age then would be 17 rather than his actual 15½. Family records and the U.S. Federal Census forms support the 1809 date.

William Clark's diaries mention Radford accompanying him in 1824 from Saint Louis to Washington, D.C. Before returning home, they diverted to New York City to observe the hero's welcome for Marquis de Lafayette. On April 29, 1825, Lafayette paid a visit to Saint Louis, where William Clark hosted his stay and Radford introduced himself as a Midshipman in the crew sailing Lafayette back to France.

Radford embarked upon another Clark trip to Washington, D.C., in the fall of 1828. An excursion in early January 1829 to visit stepbrother Meriwether Lewis Clark at West Point was abandoned due to ice floes on the Hudson River. After witnessing the inauguration of President Andrew Jackson they returned to Saint Louis.

== Mediterranean and West Indies Squadrons ==
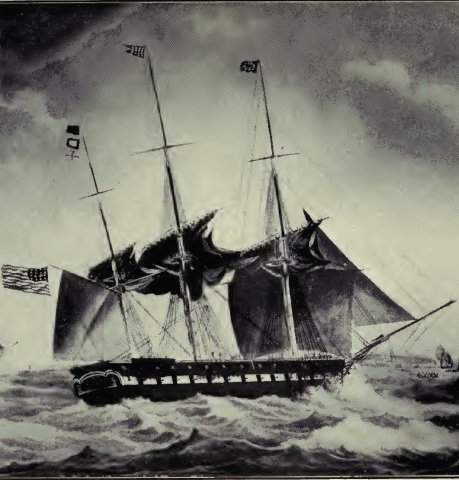
USS Brandywine off Malta, November 6, 1831

Radford was accepted March 1, 1825 into the United States Navy as a midshipman. He reported 1 August 1825 to Captain Charles Morris for duty aboard Brandywine at Washington Navy Yard. While the ship normally carried only 8 to 10 midshipmen, President Adams appointed a total of 24, to represent each state, per the request of Lafayette for his return to France. Radford represented the state of Missouri.

Lafayette was delivered to Le Havre on October 9, 1825. From there Brandywine was attached to the Mediterranean Squadron under Commodore John Rodgers. Upon the departure of Brandywine February 25, 1826, Radford transferred to Constitution to remain in the Mediterranean monitoring the Greek War of Independence and coup against the Janissaries. Rodgers was succeeded by Commodore William Crane March 30, 1827. Constitution, in need of major repairs, was recalled to Boston Navy Yard arriving on July 4, 1828.

Radford returned to Saint Louis and received orders August 10, 1829, to join Erie at Norfolk Naval Shipyard for deployment to the West Indies Squadron commanded by Commodore Charles Ridgely. Radford was promoted to passed midshipman June 4, 1831 and reported for duty in Philadelphia Naval Shipyard. In September 1831, he requested a six-month leave and was with his mother Harriet when she died December 25, 1831, Christmas Day. He was then entered into a furlough due to the general stagnation of naval affairs.

Radford was assigned to the receiving ship Sea Gull at Philadelphia in February 1834. Then in June 1834 he returned to the Mediterranean Squadron aboard John Adams as the acting Master. He suffered an attack of cholera in November 1834 and was sent ashore to recover in the south of France. Still afflicted in January 1836, he was in New Orleans, Louisiana, and, during October 1836, was recuperating at the home of his uncle William Radford II in Lynchburg, Virginia.

On February 9, 1837, Radford was appointed lieutenant. In September he rejoined the West Indies Squadron, reporting to Commodore Alexander Dallas and fighting in the second Seminole War. The maiden voyage of Preble took Radford to Labrador in June 1840. In November, he returned for a third tour with the Mediterranean Squadron, Commodore Isaac Hull in charge. On March 6, 1841, due to the Oregon Question, Radford was summoned to New York via Brandywine.

Radford traveled May 1841 to Norfolk for duty on Pennsylvania. On December 20, 1841, he received Ontario as his first command and delivered her from New York to the Rendezvous at New Orleans where she was employed as a receiving ship. Relieved of recruitment detail in August 1843, he was ordered on board the inaugural cruise of Savannah where she became the flagship of the Pacific Squadron for Commodore Alexander Dallas.

== Pacific Squadron ==
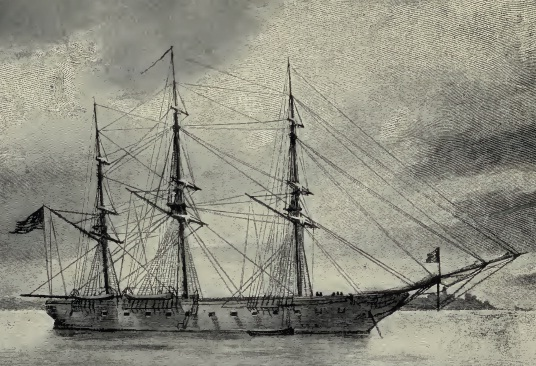
U.S. frigate Savannah, flagship of the Pacific Squadron, 1844

Radford was attached April 24, 1844, to Warren and visited Society Islands, Sandwich Islands and the western coastline of the Americas. Commodore Dallas died at Callao, Peru and was replaced by Commodore John Sloat. Radford's January 1845 letter to brother-in-law Stephen Kearny predicted California "can never be a very densely populated country" and Oregon "is not a very desirable country" yet "we should and ought by rights to have some possessions on the Pacific". He also mentions that "dysentery killed seven of the crew" and that "I was dangerously ill myself".

By May 1845 at Callao, he was again debilitated by dysentery to a degree where ship surgeons recommended he should be removed from the ship "to a more favorable climate". However, he remained aboard and, through mid-1845, patrolled the California coast where rumor of war with Mexico was rife.

Reaching Honolulu October 4, 1845, orders were received that once Mexico declared war, the squadron should "blockade or occupy such ports as force might permit". Warren set return sail on October 16 to Mazatlán to await the onset of war. Months passed until June 6, 1846, when confirmation arrived from William Maxwell Wood that land war had commenced. Warren remained at Mazatlán as the other ships of the squadron captured ports along the California coast, generally with the inhabitants cooperating. English warships, also awaiting news of war, reacted too late to offer their protectorate flags to Mexico.

Warren left Mazatlán with dispatches from Washington, D.C. and arrived at Monterey on August 17, 1846, to find Commodore Robert Stockton in charge of the Pacific Squadron. Ordered back to resume the blockade of Mazatlán, Warren arrived early morning of September 7 to find the Mexican warship Malek Adhel in the harbor. Radford commanded the boarding party which inserted during the siesta hour and securely fastened the hatches while the entire crew was below deck. Over the course of the next months, "13 or 14" additional ships were captured by the blockade, eliminating further threat from the Mexican Navy.

Despite the ease of the Conquest of California for the Navy, hostilities continued on land until a flag of truce was delivered by residents of Los Angeles on January 10, 1847. General Stephen Kearny paid a visit February 17, 1847, to his brother-in-law at Yerba Buena. After nearly four years abroad, Radford was granted leave to depart May 31, 1847, for home overland with Kearny and his troops.

== New York and East India Squadron ==
Radford arrived back in Saint Louis on August 28, 1847. He was ordered December 20, 1847, to testify in the court-martial of John C. Frémont at the Washington Arsenal. A leave was approved March 2, 1848, which indicated Radford intended to revisit Mexico with General Kearny but his letter of July 3, 1848, was sent from New York requesting a three-month extension. He went to see his cousin William Preston Griffin at Morristown, New Jersey, met Mary Lovell, married her and settled there. He commuted to his assignment at the Rendezvous in New York through January 21, 1851.

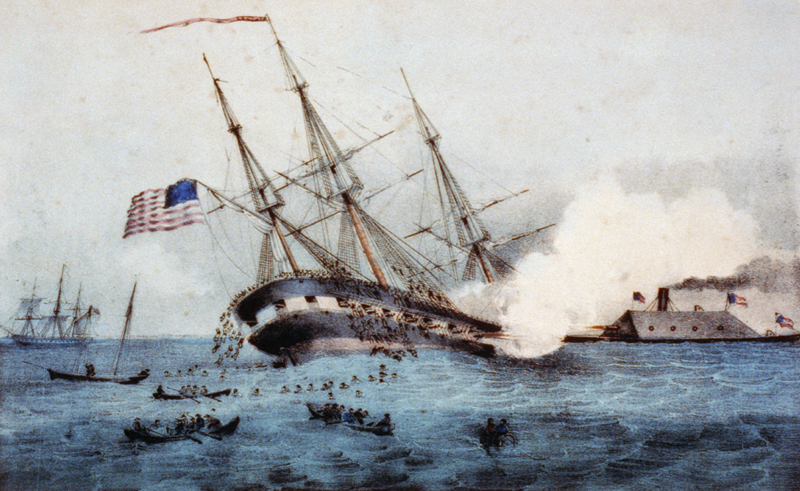
The sinking of Cumberland, 1862

On July 26, 1851, Radford took command of Lexington and sailed again to the Pacific Squadron. By March 1852 he arrived in San Francisco where he met with brother John and brother-in-law Benjamin Lovell. On the way home, a letter from his father-in-law Joseph Lovell advised that Radford's infant son, Willie, had died. Detached from Lexington on September 22, 1852, Radford returned to Morristown.

For the period 1852 until 1860, Radford was assigned shore duties in New York despite his applications for a command. For three years, he worked at the Brooklyn Navy Yard and witnessed for numerous courts-martial. In June 1855, he was given command of U.S. steamer City of Boston to prevent ships connected with filibustering expeditions from leaving the harbor. On July 20 he was appointed a member of a committee to "examine and report on the different Life Boats." Finally, Radford had a brief stint as Inspector of the Third Lighthouse District. During these years, he again shuttled from his residence in Morristown.

Radford was fortunate to receive a commission as commander September 14, 1855. Throughout 1855 and early 1856, promotions were at a standstill in the Navy partly due to the shortage of ships. Many officers were given leave to take command of merchant ships (such as U.S. Mail steamers) at significantly higher pay. To overcome this quandary, a Naval Retiring Board was formed which upset the older officers but cheered younger members of the service.

He took command of Dacotah April 23, 1860, and sailed to Hong Kong as a unit of the East India Squadron for Commodore Cornelius Stribling. However, after the onset of the Civil War, both Radford and Stribling were relieved of their commands and ordered to return Washington, D.C. despite their declarations of allegiance to the Union. Commodore Samuel Du Pont in Washington, D.C. explained to Radford's wife Mary that, with the number of defections from both the Army and Navy, all officers from slave states must be evaluated for risk. Radford arrived home October 12, 1861, seriously ill with smallpox but recovered quickly. After an interview with Secretary of the Navy Gideon Welles, he was reappointed Inspector of the Third Lighthouse District at New York.

== Civil War ==
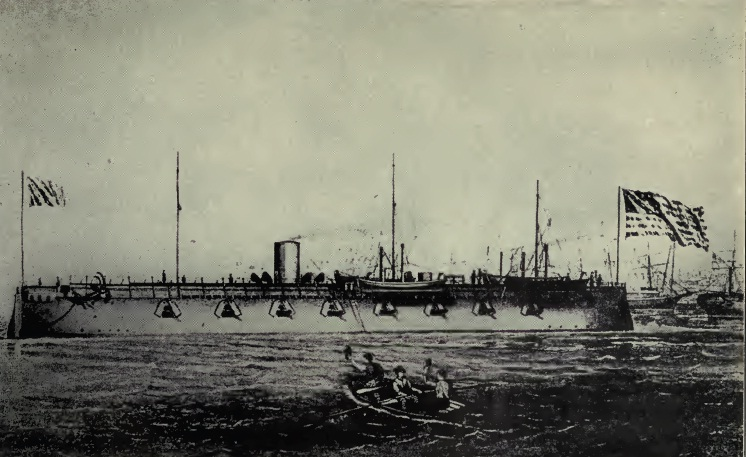
U.S. frigate New Ironsides, Commodore Radford's flagship, 1864

On February 8, 1862, Radford accepted command of Cumberland. He was aboard Roanoke as a member of a Naval Board of Inquiry March 8, 1862, when his ship was sunk by the Confederate ram Virginia during the Battle of Hampton Roads.

A Naval Board convened in April 1862 at the Naval Academy Preparatory School with Radford as a member. He received, June 10, 1862, temporary duty as Executive Officer of Brooklyn Navy Yard under command of Rear Admiral Hiram Paulding. The assignment stretched into almost two years of equipping and fitting-out hundreds of vessels for the Navy. Radford received promotion to captain July 16, 1862, and then to commodore April 24, 1863.

On May 15, 1864, Radford was directed to report to Rear Admiral John Dahlgren at Philadelphia for command of the armored ship New Ironsides. Upon arrival it was determined the ship required repairs so Radford was relieved and ordered to a Naval Board in Washington, D.C. during July 1864. He was recommitted to USS New Ironsides on August 16, 1864, and joined the North Atlantic Blockading Squadron at Hampton Roads. Rear Admiral David Porter assembled a fleet to attack Fort Fisher for the control of Cape Fear River. He placed Radford in command of the Ironclad Division, consisting of flagship USS New Ironsides, Dictator, Monadnock, Canonicus, Saugus and Mahopac during attacks on Fort Fisher in December 1864 and in January 1865. David Porter commended Radford's support for the Union forces ashore and eight members of his crew were awarded the Medal of Honor.

New Ironsides sailed January 24, 1865, up the James River to Bermuda Hundred to protect the stores of the Army of the Potomac from a threatened raid by Confederate rams during the siege of Petersburg. Radford took charge of the flotilla assembled there and coordinated with Generals Ulysses Grant and Edward Ord. Radford transferred his flag to Dumbarton when New Ironsides was sent to Norfolk Naval yard February 18, 1865, for repairs. With the end of war near, Dumbarton departed from the James River March 22, 1865, and officers and crew were detached upon arrival at the Washington Navy Yard.

On April 4, 1865, Radford sailed Phlox from Washington, D.C. up the James River and arrived at City Point, Virginia, the next evening. From there, he conveyed Vice President Andrew Johnson and Preston King to Richmond, Virginia, and back. President Abraham Lincoln was already in Richmond, unaccompanied by any of his Cabinet, to witness the downfall of the Confederate stronghold. He became agitated about the Johnson and King arrival and ordered Radford to keep both of his passengers elsewhere. While moored for two days, Radford discovered stepbrother Meriwether Clark was a prisoner of war and brought him aboard Phlox to await release.

== North Atlantic and European Squadrons ==
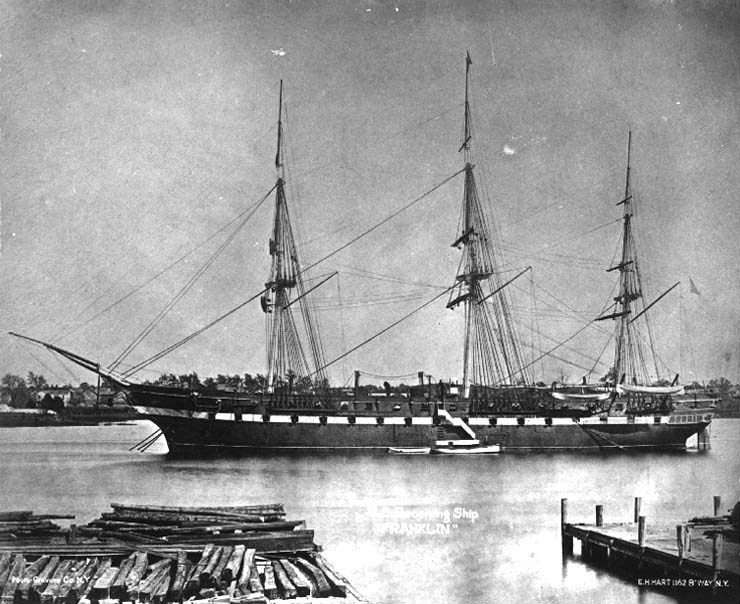
USS Franklin in 1864

Commodore Radford was appointed April 28, 1865, to command the North Atlantic Squadron as Acting Rear Admiral. He transferred his flag May 15, 1865, from Phlox to Malvern, which remained his flagship during his tenure. He was called October 10, 1865, to oversee the Washington Navy Yard. He moved his wife, two daughters and three sons from New Jersey to a Washington, D.C. home in November.

In March 1866, Radford was elected as a companion of the Pennsylvania Commandery of the Military Order of the Loyal Legion of the United States. He was promoted to rear admiral on July 25, 1866.

Radford left Washington January 20, 1869, with his family in tow and arrived in New York to embark on Franklin to Lisbon, Portugal. After seventeen days of stormy passage, Radford arrived to take charge of the European Squadron and found all attached vessels, Ticonderoga, Richmond, Swatara, Frolic and Guard, lying at anchor in the harbor waiting for his orders.

As Radford performed his duties, his family traveled with him on Franklin to Spain, Algiers, France, the Netherlands and Italy. During 1870, the children attended school at Lausanne, Switzerland. A month after the outbreak of the Franco-Prussian War, Radford relinquished his command August 10, 1870, to Rear Admiral Oliver Glisson. He travelled to Lausanne to retrieve his children believing any battles would be distant. After arrival in Paris, the surrender of the French Army on September 2, 1870, caused the Radford family to flee the advancing Prussian Army. At Havre they negotiated commercial passage to the United States.

Radford was listed by the Navy as retired on March 1, 1870. However, from October 1, 1870, through the next two years, he served on several Naval Boards of Inquiry chaired by Rear Admiral Joseph Smith, Rear Admiral Theodorus Bailey and Vice Admiral Stephen Rowan.

== Marriage and family ==
Radford married Mary "Minnie" Elizabeth Lovell [April 12, 1829 – October 27, 1903 (aged 74)] in St. Peter's Church, Morristown, New Jersey November 3, 1848. The ceremony was overcast due to the death of brother-in-law Stephen Kearny a few days before. The Radfords resided on Mount Kemble Avenue for almost twenty years in a house previously owned by John Doughty.

Children of William and Elizabeth (all born in Morristown, New Jersey except Henry who was born in Washington, D.C.) were: Mary Lovell Radford; William Radford; Sophie Adelaide Radford; Stephen Kearny Radford; George Reginald Radford; Edmund Ironsides Radford; and Henry Carlton Radford.

Daughter Sophie became a writer including a play produced on Broadway and her father's biography Old Naval Days.

Son George Reginald and grandson William Radford Coyle (from daughter Mary Lovell Radford Coyle's lineage) married sisters. Mary and Jane Dodson respectively were daughters of Weston Dodson, founder of Weston Dodson & Company in Bethlehem, Pennsylvania. Coyle served three terms from Pennsylvania as a member of the U.S. House of Representatives.

Granddaughter Mary Lovell Radford (from son Stephen Kearny Radford's lineage), on April 5, 1918, during World War I, launched USS Radford (DD-120), a Wickes-class destroyer named for her grandfather.

Granddaughter Edith Lovell Coyle (from daughter Mary Lovell Radford Coyle's lineage) married François E. Matthes. On May 13, 1942, during World War II, she launched the USS Radford (DD-446), a Fletcher-class destroyer in the United States Navy named for her grandfather.

Great-granddaughter (from son Stephen Kearny Radford's lineage) Rosemary Radford Ruether pioneered feminist theology.

Radford died on January 8, 1890. He was interred at Oak Hill Cemetery in Washington, D.C.

== Legacy ==
When the Brandywine arrived in France in 1825, Radford purchased a set of dining room chairs which he shipped back to the Clark household in St. Louis, Missouri. The Clark family referred to them as the "Lafayette Chairs" per the trip's famous passenger.

Radford, as a witness, signed at least three treaties between the United States and American Indian nations. He had attended the ceremonies with stepfather William Clark, who was serving as Superintendent of Indian Affairs.

Radford built an elegant Victorian mansion during 1875 at 1736 (now 1734) N Street NW in the DuPont Circle neighborhood of Washington, D.C. It is now the General Federation of Women's Clubs Headquarters.

Portraits
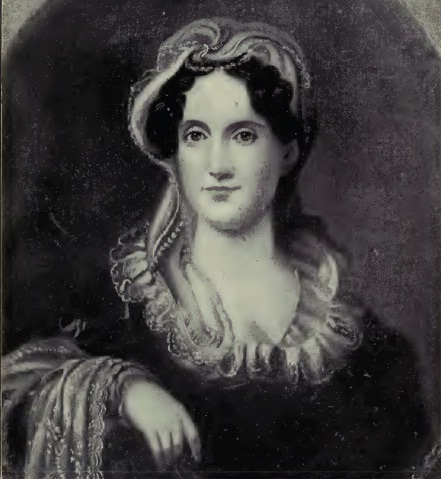
Harriet Kennerly Radford Clark, mother of Admiral Radford

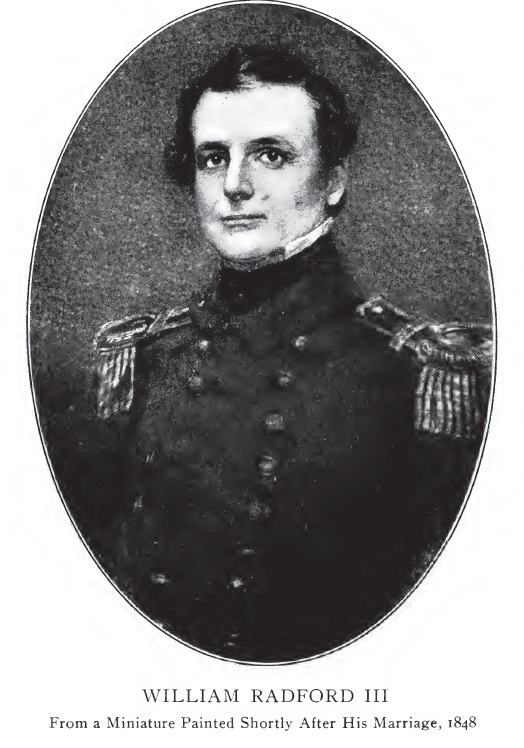
Miniature painted after his marriage, 1848.

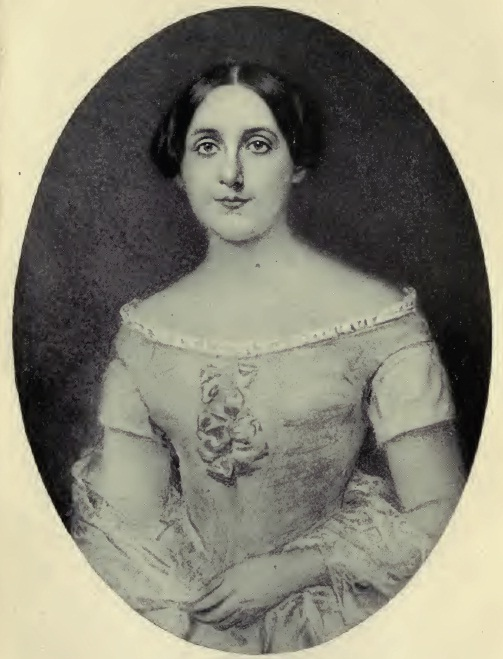
Mary Elizabeth Lovell Radford, wife of Admiral Radford, 1850

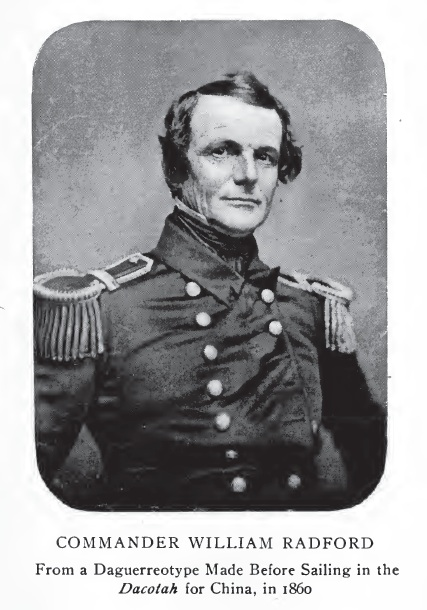
Daguerreotype made before sailing for China, 1860.

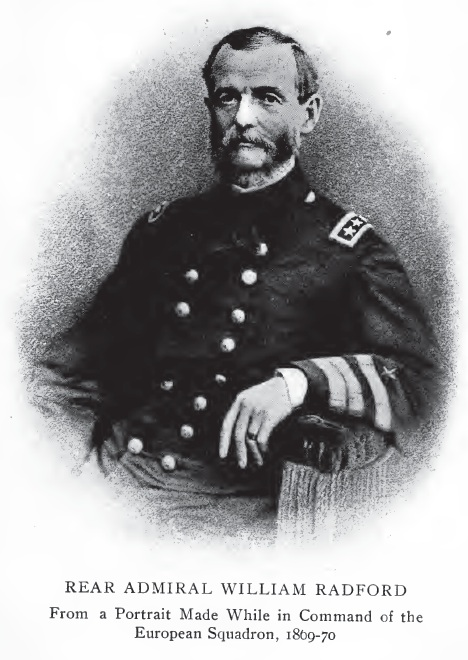
Portrait made when in command of the European Squadron, c. 1870.
