= Big Spring Baptist Church =

Big Spring Baptist Church may refer to:

- Big Spring Baptist Church (Midway, Kentucky), listed on the National Register of Historic Places in Woodford County, Kentucky
- Big Spring Baptist Church (Elliston, Virginia), listed on the National Register of Historic Places in Montgomery County, Virginia
