= Fotheringay (disambiguation) =

Fotheringay is a 1970-71 British folk-rock band.

Fotheringay or Fotheringhay may also refer to:

- "Fotheringay", a 1969 song by Fairport Convention from the album What We Did on Our Holidays
- Fotheringay (album), a 1970 album by the band
- Fotheringay 2, a 2008 album by the band
- Fotheringhay, a village and civil parish in Northamptonshire, England
- Fotheringhay Castle, also known as Fotheringay Castle, a castle in Fotheringhay, England that existed from around 1100 to 1630
- Fotheringay (Elliston, Virginia), a historic plantation home
