= USS Radford (DD-446) =

Fletcher-class destroyer

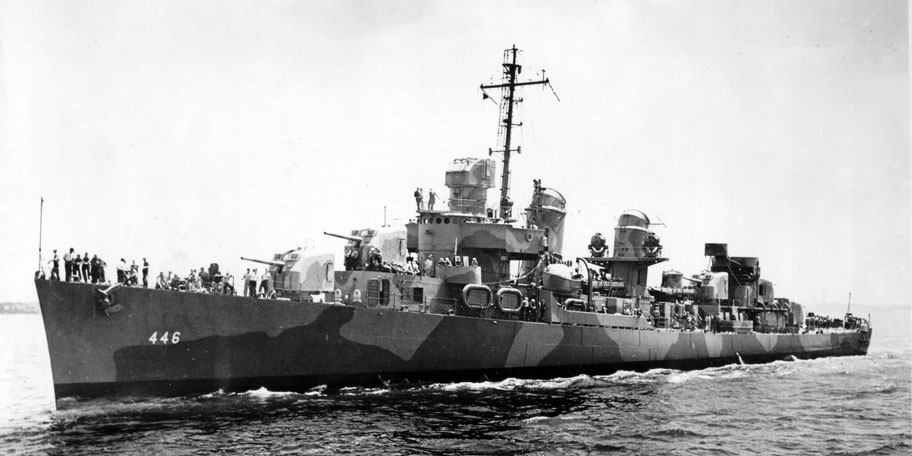
- USS Radford (DD-446)

History

United States
- Name: Radford
- Namesake: Rear Admiral William Radford
- Builder: Federal Shipbuilding and Drydock Company
- Laid down: 2 October 1941
- Launched: 3 May 1942
- Commissioned: 22 July 1942
- Decommissioned: 10 November 1969
- Stricken: 10 November 1969
- Fate: Sold October 1970 for scrap

General characteristics
- Class & type: Fletcher-class destroyer
- Displacement: 2,050 tons
- Length: 376 ft 5 in (114.73 m)
- Beam: 39 ft 7 in (12.07 m)
- Draft: 17 ft 9 in (5.41 m)
- Installed power: 60,000 shp (45,000 kW)
- Propulsion: geared turbines; 2 propellers
- Speed: 38 knots (70 km/h; 44 mph)
- Range: 6,500 nmi (12,000 km; 7,500 mi) at 15 kn (28 km/h; 17 mph)
- Complement: 329 officers and enlisted
- Armament: 5 × single Mk 12 5 in (127 mm)/38 guns; 5 × twin 40 mm (1.6 in) Bofors AA guns; 7 × single 20 mm (0.8 in) Oerlikon AA guns; 2 × quintuple 21 in (533 mm) torpedo tubes; 6 × single depth charge throwers; 2 × depth charge racks; FRAM II modifications: 2 × 5 in/38 cal. guns, 1 Mark 108 ASW rocket launcher, 6 × Mark 44 18 in ASW torpedo tubes, 2 x Hedgehog projectors, 2 x Mark 14 21 in torpedo tubes, 2 × .50 cal (12.7 mm) guns M2 machineguns

USS Radford (DD-446), named for Rear Admiral William Radford, was a Fletcher-class destroyer in the United States Navy. Entering service in 1942 during World War II the ship also saw action during the Korean War and the Vietnam War. The ship was removed from service in 1969 and sold for scrap in 1970.

== Construction and career ==
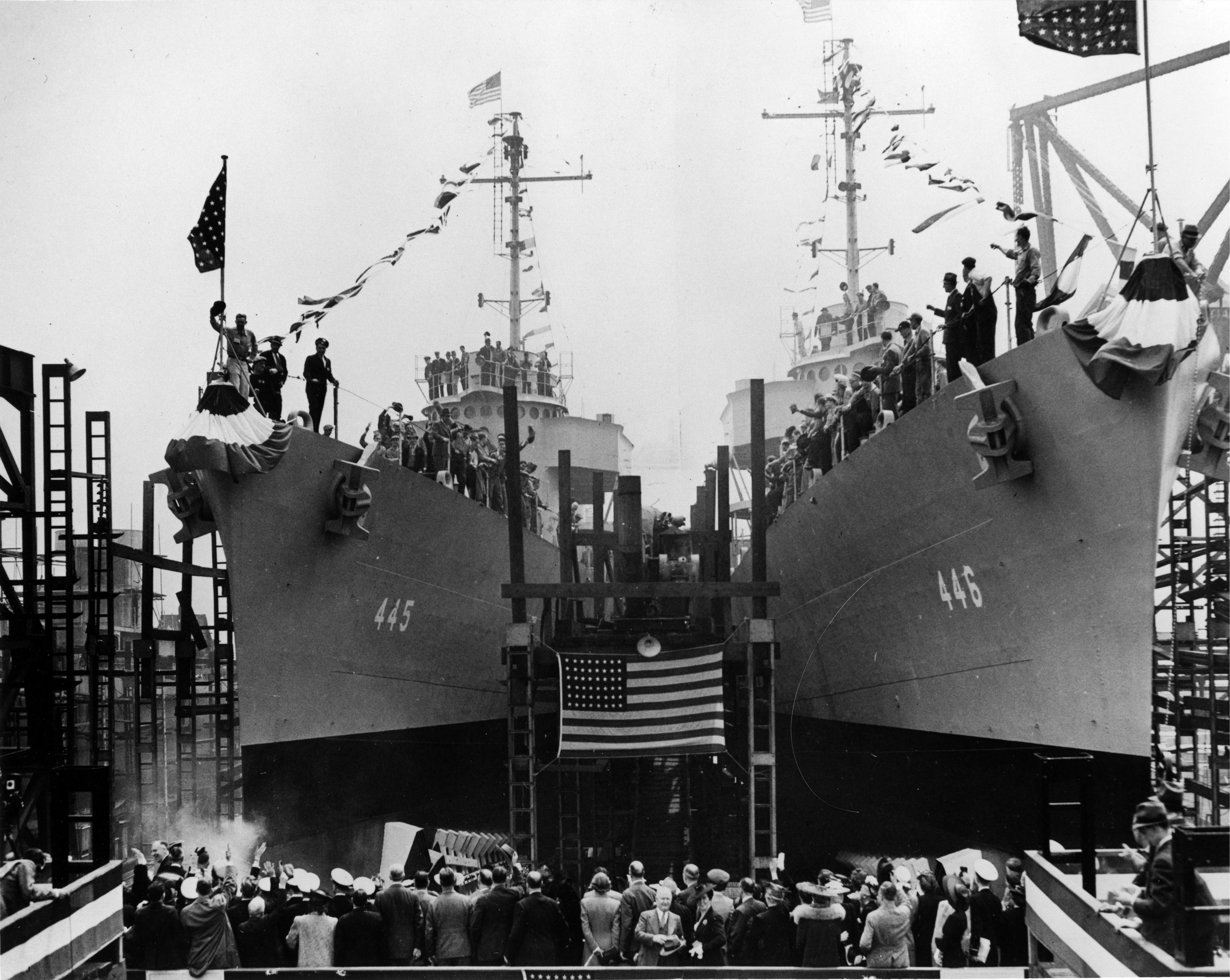
Launch of Fletcher and Radford, 3 May 1942

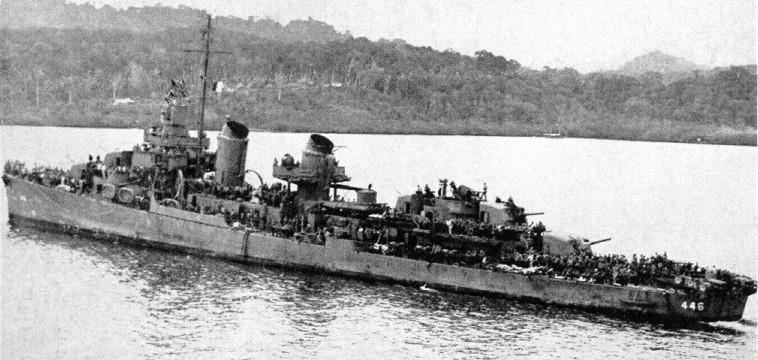
USS Radford returning to Tulagi with some survivors of the cruiser Helena on 6 July 1943

Radford was laid down by the Federal Shipbuilding and Drydock Company at Kearny, New Jersey on 2 October 1941 and was launched on 3 May 1942 by Radford's granddaughter Edith (Mrs. François E. Matthes). The destroyer was commissioned on 22 July 1942.

Radford participated in the Battle of Kula Gulf and the Battle of Kolombangara in July 1943. She engaged in an offensive sweep against the Tokyo Express, and received Presidential Unit Citation for the rescue of 468 survivors from the cruiser USS Helena, which had been sunk at Kula Gulf. Radford depth charged and sank the Japanese submarine I-19, which had previously sunk destroyer USS O'Brien and the aircraft carrier USS Wasp, on 25 November 1943. The destroyer was damaged by a Japanese mine while supporting the liberation of Luzon in December 1944 and received a Presidential Unit Citation from the Philippine government. The ship was decommissioned on the 17th of January 1946 and placed in reserve at San Francisco.

Radford was recommissioned on 17 October 1949, and operated with the United States Seventh Fleet in support of United Nations Forces during the Korean War. Following the armistice in 1953, she alternated operations along the west coast and in Hawaiian waters with annual deployments to the western Pacific with the Seventh Fleet. In 1960, Radford underwent an extensive Fleet Rehabilitation and Modernization (FRAM II) overhaul at the Pearl Harbor Navy Yard.

On 3 March 1965, Radford, in company with other units of Destroyer Division 252, departed Pearl Harbor on short notice to augment destroyer forces for the rapidly expanding naval commitments in the South China Sea. In October and December Radford served as an alternate recovery ship in Project Gemini and participated in Sea Dragon and Market Time operations, patrolled on search and rescue duties and carried out naval gunfire support (NGFS) missions during the Vietnam War from 1965 through 1969.

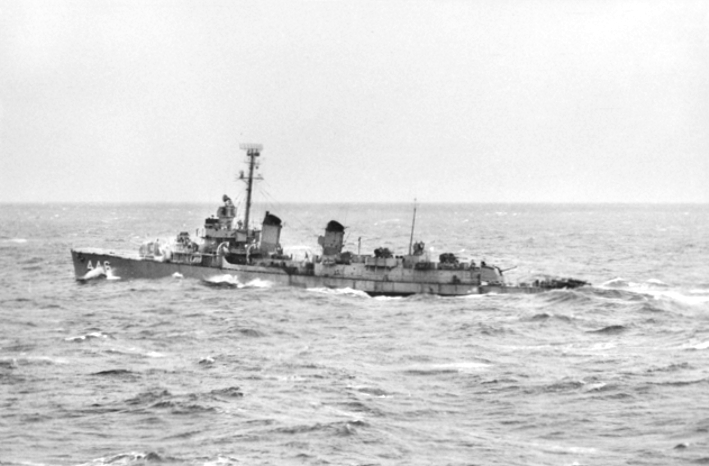
Radford off Korea in 1951.

Her eleventh WestPac tour began on 5 July 1966. During this period, she participated in anti-submarine operations, escorted aircraft carriers in the Gulf of Tonkin, had two tours of duty on NGFS missions, a turn on the Taiwan patrol, served as forward picket for the Seventh Fleet units operating in the South China Sea and escorted President Lyndon B. Johnson's support units to Malaysia during his tour of southeast Asia. DesDiv 252 returned to Pearl Harbor on 16 December 1966.

Radford was decommissioned at San Francisco just months after returning from her 1969 WestPac tour. She was stricken from the Naval Vessel Register on 10 November 1969, and sold for scrap in October 1970, but not before she fought one last battle on her own. She broke away from the tug that was towing her from Vallejo, California to the Portland, Oregon scrap yard, and took them on a 34-mile (55 km), all day chase toward the Oregon coast.

== Awards ==
Radford received twelve battle stars and two Presidential Unit Citations for World War II service, five battle stars for the Korean War, four for the Vietnam War, and the Armed Forces Expeditionary Medal.

== USS Radford National Naval Museum ==
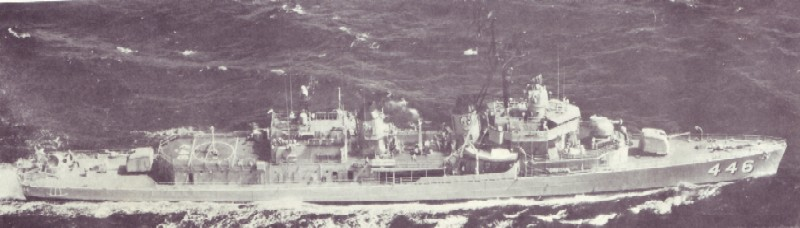
Radford following her FRAM II modernization with DASH-flight deck aft.

The USS Radford National Naval Museum was a collection of memorabilia about the ship that was located in Newcomerstown, Ohio. The museum closed in 2011 and its contents were moved to the USS Orleck Naval Museum that is located in Jacksonville, Florida. Exhibits include photos, uniforms, and displays about the ship and her service.
