= Barnett House (Elliston, Virginia) =

Historic house in Virginia, United States

- U.S. National Register of Historic Places
- Virginia Landmarks Register
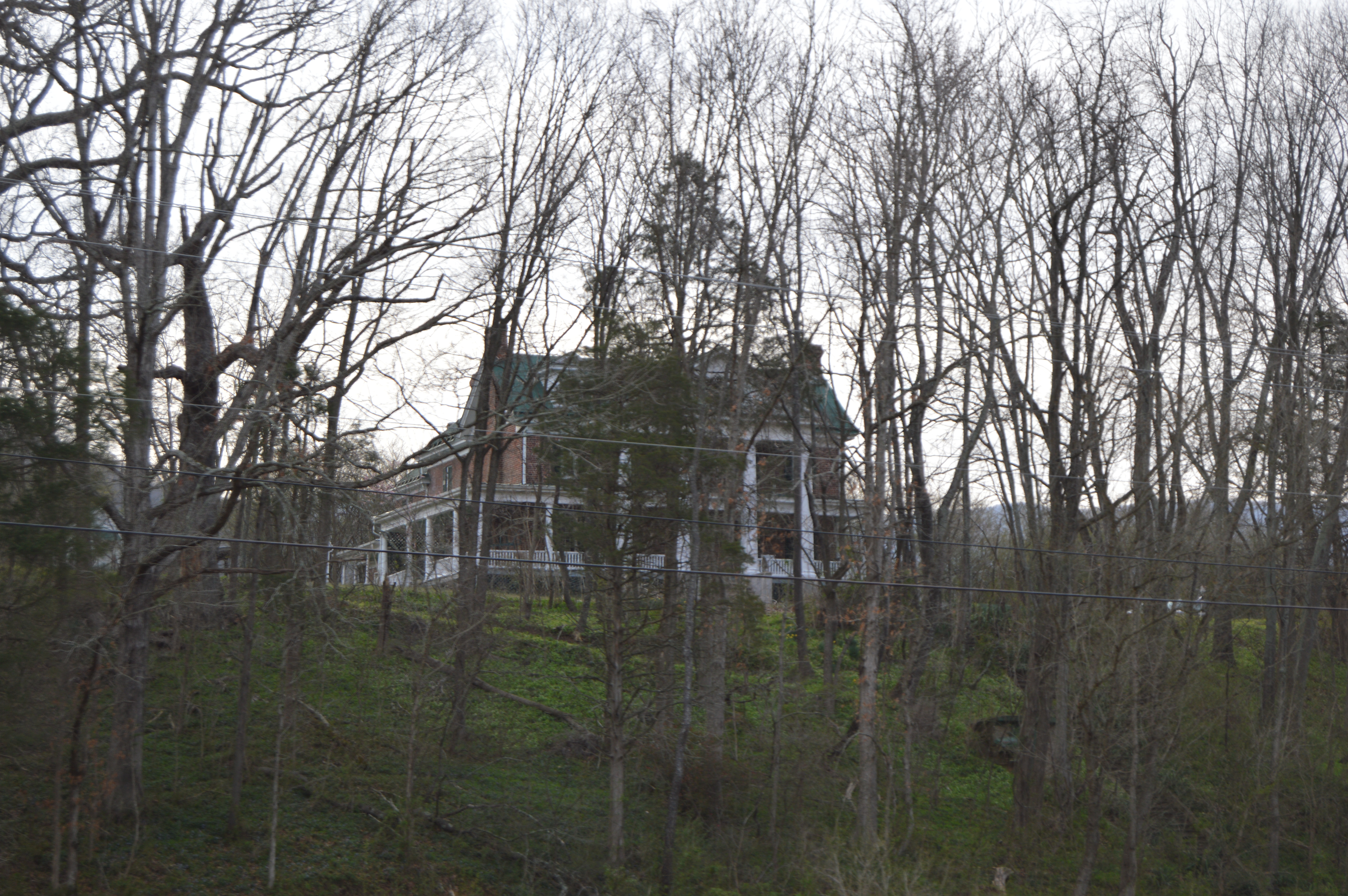
- Seen from U.S. Route 460

- Location within Virginia Location within the United States
- Location: US 460/11, 0.3 miles (0.48 km) south of the junction with VA 631, near Elliston, Virginia
- Coordinates: 37°12′39″N 80°14′0″W
- Area: 1 acre (0.40 ha)
- Built: c. 1808
- Architectural style: Colonial Revival, Single-pile center-passage
- MPS: Montgomery County MPS
- NRHP reference No.: 89001810
- VLR No.: 060-0440

Significant dates
- Added to NRHP: November 13, 1989
- Designated VLR: June 20, 1989

Barnett House, also known as Big Spring, is a historic home located near Elliston, Montgomery County, Virginia. The house was built about 1808, and underwent a radical transformation in the early 20th century. It is a two-story, five bay brick dwelling with a single pile central passage plan. The front facade features a one-story wraparound porch through the two-story portico across the façade. Also on the property is a contributing stuccoed frame meathouse.

It was listed on the National Register of Historic Places in 1989.
