= Christopher H. Clark =

American politician (1767-1828)

Christopher Henderson Clark

Member of the U.S. House of Representatives from Virginia
- In office November 5, 1804 – July 1, 1806
- Preceded by: John J. Trigg
- Succeeded by: William A. Burwell
- Constituency: 13th district

Member of the Virginia House of Delegates from Bedford County
- In office October 18, 1790 – October 16, 1791
- Preceded by: Thomas Leftwich
- Succeeded by: David Saunders

Personal details
- Born: 1767 Albemarle County, Virginia
- Died: November 21, 1828 (aged 60–61) New London, Virginia
- Relatives: James Clark (brother); John Bullock Clark, Sr. (nephew)
- Profession: lawyer, politician

Christopher Henderson Clark (1767 – November 21, 1828)(nicknamed "Chris" or "Kit", sometimes surname spelled "Clarke") was a congressman and lawyer from Virginia. Despite his legislative service, he experienced severe consequences from the Panic of 1819 and might today be best known as a political supporter of and lawyer for Thomas Jefferson, or for his family relationships. A relative of George Rogers Clark, this Clark trained his younger brother James Clark as a lawyer before he became a Kentucky congressman. A nephew was Missouri and Confederate congressman John Bullock Clark, Sr. and a great-nephew was Confederate General and Missouri congressman John Bullock Clark, Jr.

== Early life and education ==
Born in Albemarle County in the Colony of Virginia to the former Susanna Henderson (daughter of John Henderson) and her husband Robert Clark (1738-1816). His parents had married in 1760, and this Christopher was their third of what would become eight sons and six daughters, although he also had an uncle of the same name who he probably never met because he moved to Georgia. His name probably honors his great-grandfather Christopher Clark, a wealthy tobacco planter who owned more than 5,000 acres in Louisa and Albemarle Counties and became a Quaker late in his life. The elder Christopher Clark's son Micajah was this man's grandfather (and a friend of Thomas Jefferson). That elder Christopher Clark of the Camp Creek Quaker meeting in Louisa County and another son, Bowling Clark, had established a Quaker meeting in 1749 near Sugarloaf Mountain and Stony Point in Albemarle County, and the road between them was called "Clark's Tract." That elder Christopher Clark took an Irish boy named Charles Lynch as an indentured servant, oversaw his education and he eventually married Clark's daughter Susan as well as founded Lynchburg on the James River where Charles Lynch had established a ferry. Charles Lynch's widow and executrix donated land in Bedford County to establish another Quaker meeting, at South River near what had become Lynchburg in Bedford County, Virginia in 1754. Her brother Bowling Clark and ferryman Edward Clark became its first overseers, although when the widow remarried to non-Quaker Major John Ward she was disowned (as was her son also Charles Lynch, for engaging in war as well as for making solemn oaths instead of affirmations), though another son, John Lynch, humbled himself and was accepted back into the Quaker meeting. Thus, about 1765 Robert Clark moved his growing family to the Peaks of Otter region of Bedford County.

As the Revolutionary War began (and this boy was not yet a teenager), New London, the Bedford county seat, had about 80 houses and five stores as well as a patriot arsenal depot. His father was elected captain of a militia company in 1778. British raiders led by Col. Banastre Tarleton, who arrived on July 16, 1781 and two days later left for Lunenburg County en route to join General Cornwallis's army at Suffolk on July 25, 1784. Robert Clark served in the Virginia House of Delegates as well as a county judge after the war, and later represented Clark County Kentucky in the Kentucky legislature 1797-1801. In 1786, Robert Clark became one of three trustees (alongside Robert Ewing and William Leftwich) whom Virginia's legislature empowered to sell the old courthouse in New London. This Christopher Clark later attended Liberty Hall Academy in Lexington, then studied law in the office of Patrick Henry.

In 1794, the large Robert Clark family (except this young man and two married sisters) continued their westward migration by moving to Clark County, Kentucky. The eldest brother, Robert Clark Jr., became a Kentucky state senator as well as the first manufacturer of pig iron in what became the new state (and his son Robert Clark III noted for his military service in the War of 1812), and the youngest brother James Clark became a Congressman, but Bennett Clark would continue the family's westward migration to Missouri. In 1790, his elder sister Elizabeth Clark married Stephen Trigg of Kentucky, the son of John Johns Trigg, and her sister Frances/Fannnie married Jeremiah Rogers in Kentucky. This man eventually became an elder of the Hat Creek Church, which had a Baptist minister early in the Revolutionary War, but in the early 19th century called Presbyterian ministers.

== Career ==
Admitted to the Virginia bar in 1788, seven years after Campbell County was created by splitting Bedford County, Clark began a legal practice in New London, the former county seat of Bedford County (Liberty became the new Bedford County street and much later was renamed the town of Bedford). Despite his lack of experience, he was appointed the county's commonwealth attorney (prosecutor) on November 24, 1788 and remained in that position until September 1803. Around 1805 Bayly moved to "Mount Prospect" plantation near Jefferson's Poplar Forest plantation, and a decade later (two days before his second marriage described below), he purchase "The Grove", a 1,050 acre plantation adjacent to Poplar Forest.

In 1790, Bedford County voters elected Clark as their (part-time) representative in the Virginia House of Delegates, and he served one term alongside veteran legislator and future Congressman John J. Trigg (whose son that year had married Clark's elder sister). Clark replaced Thomas Leftwich, but the next year was replaced by Col. David Saunders, a Revolutionary War veteran who would serve three more legislative terms.

In a special election in 1804 to fill a vacancy caused by the death of John J. Trigg, Clark ran as a Democratic-Republican and won election to the United States House of Representatives. However, he resigned, although sources differ as to whether on July 1, or August, 1806. During his term, Clark was one of the impeachment managers against Justice Samuel Chase, although with one speech during the (unsuccessful) proceedings (concerning Chase's improper application of Virginia law in the 1800 trial of journalist James Thomson Callender), he was one of the less active members. Clark was less successful in his attempt to secure the post of minister to Great Britain for John Randolph of Roanoke. Clark generally supported Thomas Jefferson, and later as a lawyer helped Jefferson with legal matters in Bedford County.

Clark resumed practicing law, and his clients included his father-in-law and the wealthy Callaway family of Bedford and nearby counties. He also operated plantations until his death, and in 1812 wrote Jefferson as he considered giving up his legal career to concentrate on agriculture. Bayly was also involved in the New London Academy.

Although the Quakers of the South River meeting sold their slaves, and Susan Clark Lynch's daughter Sarah Lynch-Terrell became an antislavery leader before her death in 1774, Clark's father owned slaves. Clark's household in the 1820 census, the last of his lifetime, included 47 persons, including two free blacks and 40 enslaved. Because of his disastrous financial position after the Panic of 1819, Clark sold property at a loss and finally on July 20, 1820 signed over everything he owned, including 60 slaves, to creditors.

== Personal life ==
Clark survived two wives. In April 1790 in Franklin County, Clark married Elizabeth Hook, daughter of Scottish immigrant and merchant John Hook, who more than a decade earlier had been the target of a famous speech by Patrick Henry at the New London courthouse about beef and war profiteers, as Henry defended of John Venable. Elizabeth Hook bore ten children before her death in 1810, but their first three sons died as boys, and only Christopher Clark Jr. (1802-1828), Edward W. Clark (1805-1865) and Andrew Clark (1809-1854) reached adulthood, as would their sisters Charlotte C. Scott (1795-1820), Elizabeth C. Hendrick (1800-1845, who moved to Jefferson County, Virginia) and Mary C. Joplin (b.1804). In 1815, the widowed Clark later married Mary Norvell, who bore a daughter, Mary Louisa Clark (1809-1891) before her death in 1819, and that daughter who became a widow in Missouri would be the only one of this man's children to survive the American Civil War, eventually dying in Collingsworth County, Texas, not far from her son CSA Sgt. Thomas C. Jopling.

== Death and legacy ==
Clark was devastated by the death of his second wife in 1819, combined with the Panic of 1819 led to financial disaster, and many lawsuits. Destitute and debilitated, he died in a private home near New London on November 21, 1828, and was interred at a private cemetery at Old Lawyers Station near Lynchburg, Virginia.

U.S. House of Representatives
Preceded by John J. Trigg	Member of the U.S. House of Representatives from Virginia's 13th congressional district November 5, 1804 – July 1, 1806 (obsolete district)	Succeeded by William A. Burwell
