= Sophie Radford de Meissner =

American dramatist

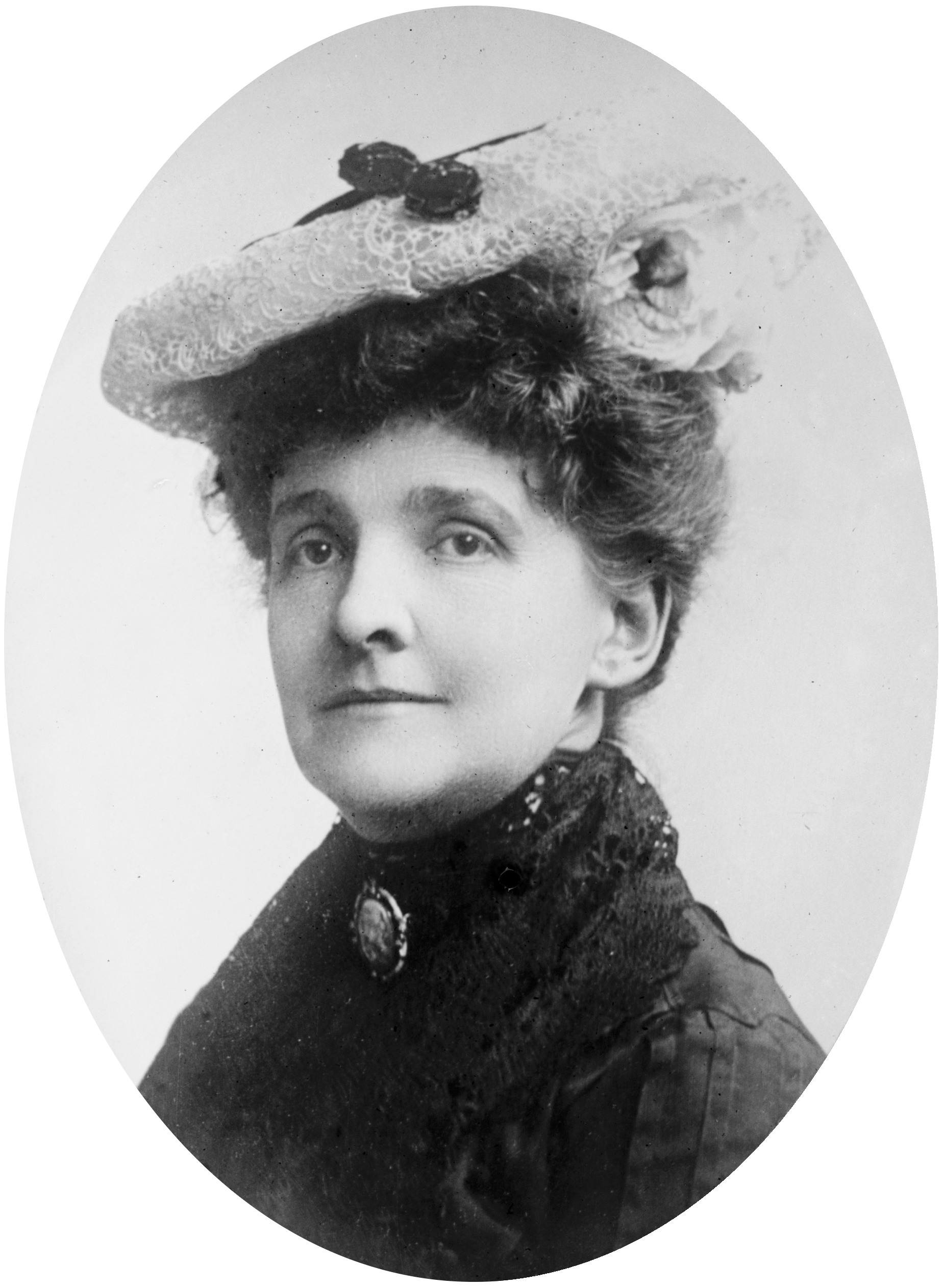
- Circa 1910–15
- Born: Sophie Adelaide Radford; November 17, 1854; Morristown, New Jersey, U.S.
- Died: April 17, 1957 (aged 102); Washington, D.C., U.S.
- Resting place: Oak Hill Cemetery; Washington, D.C., U.S.
- Occupations: Novelist; playwright; historian; spiritualist
- Relatives: William Radford (father)
- Writing career
- Language: English

Sophie Adelaide Radford de Meissner (November 17, 1854 – April 17, 1957) was an American author, playwright, diplomat's wife, spiritualist and socialite.

== Childhood ==
Sophie was born third of seven children to William Radford (September 9, 1809 – January 8, 1890), an officer in the United States Navy, and Mary "Minnie" Elizabeth Lovell (April 12, 1829 – October 27, 1903). All the Radford children were born in Morristown, New Jersey except Henry, who was born in Washington, D.C.

The Radfords resided with their in-laws, the Lovells, on Mount Kemble Avenue in a house previously owned by General John Doughty. At the close of the American Civil War, the Radfords moved to Washington, D.C. Sophie attended Madam Burr's School near Fourteenth Street and New York Avenue where the language was French only, regardless of the subject. She took her grand tour when her father received command of the European Squadron in early 1869 and took his wife and six children to accompany him to Europe.

As Radford performed his naval duties in the Mediterranean Sea and European west coast, his family sailed with him to Spain, Portugal, Algiers, France, the Netherlands, and Italy. During 1870, Sophie and siblings attended school at Lausanne, Switzerland. A month after the outbreak of the Franco-Prussian War, her father relinquished his command and went to Lausanne to retrieve his children believing any battles would be distant. After arrival in Paris, the surrender of the French Army on Sep 2, 1870, caused the Radford family to flee the advancing Prussian Army. At Le Havre they negotiated commercial passage to the United States.

== Marriage and family ==
On February 22, 1877, Sophie fell from her horse while riding in Rock Creek Park and fractured her skull. She remained unconscious into March. Among callers to the family was Waldemar de Meissner, first secretary of the Russian Legation. They married November 20, 1877 in two ceremonies: first at the Episcopal Church and then at the Radford residence on 1736 (now 1734) N Street NW in the DuPont Circle neighborhood. Attendees included President Rutherford B. Hayes and William Tecumseh Sherman.

During the next 20 years, de Meissner's diplomatic career took them to Saint Petersburg, Bern and Lisbon. Their only child was a son, Alexandre (also known as Sacha), born September 24, 1878. Sacha was educated in a military college in Russia and rose to the rank of cornet in the 44th Regiment of Dragoons of the Imperial Russian Army.

In the spring of 1896, Sophie travelled to Russia to visit her son. Waldemar remained in Lisbon, but contracted pneumonia and died during her absence, on April 17, 1896. Sophie moved back to Saint Petersburg to be near her son, accepting a position as lady-in-waiting to another widow, the dowager Empress of Russia, Maria Feodorovna. Three years later, Sacha contracted a throat infection and died on August 28, 1899. Sophie returned to Washington, D.C., widowed and childless at age 45, to reside at her mother's Georgetown home. She died in 1957. She was buried at Oak Hill Cemetery in Washington, D.C.

== Writing career ==
Sophie wrote for magazines, many articles based upon her experiences abroad. Among them are:

- "A Happy Accident" appeared in Scribner's Magazine, April 1888, pp. 461–479.
- "Under Police Protection: An Episode in the Life of the Late Chief of the Russian Police" appeared in Scribner's Magazine, December 1892, pp. 772–778.
- "Two Tests" appeared in The Forum, June 1924, pp. 803–805.
- "The Wild Horseman, Count Chandor" appeared in Wide Awake, November 1888
- "The Origin of "The Magic Flute"" appeared in Wide Awake, September 1889
- "How the Cossacks Play Polo" appeared Wide Awake, August 1891

Many of her books are still in publication and include:

- The Terrace of Mon Desir (1889)
- The Tscherkeese Prince (1892)
- There Are No Dead (1912)
- Old Naval Days: Sketches from the Life of Rear Admiral William Radford, U. S. N. (a biography of her father) (1920)
- Rachel Ogden (1928)
- The Shepherd King (1931)

The Russian play "Ivan the Terrible" was written circa 1866 about Ivan IV Vasilyevich, who ruled as the first Tsar of All the Russias. The play was one of a trilogy written by Count Aleksey Konstantinovich Tolstoy, a cousin of Count Leo Tolstoy. She attended a production of the play in Russia and determined to translate it into English. In 1901, Sophie sent the play to theatrical agent Elisabeth Marbury to show to actor Richard Mansfield.

Mansfield signed a contract with Sophie February 1, 1902 to star in and produce the play. The play premiered March 1, 1904 on Broadway in the New Amsterdam Theatre with Mansfield performing the title row. Mansfield kept the role in his repertoire until his death.

In 1902 during a return trip to Russia, she translated the second play of Tolstoy's trilogy, Tsar Fyodor Ioannovich.

== Spiritualism ==
Sophie became a proponent of spiritualism. Her book There Are No Dead is a collection of conversations with deceased family, friends and others. The first entry was recorded twelve hours after the death of her son. She made newspaper headlines in 1912 when she requested an audience with President William Howard Taft after the sinking of the Titanic. She said she had a message to deliver from a victim of the sinking, Archibald Butt, who was an aide and close friend to Taft.

Two other victims of the Titanic sinking and also associated with Taft, William Thomas Stead (also a spiritualist) and Francis Davis Millet are said to have communicated with Sophie.

== Legacy ==
During a visit to Saint Petersburg in 1905, she served in the Red Cross to tend casualties from the Russo-Japanese War.

Articles in the society pages of Washington D.C. from the early 1900s mention her at gatherings as a speaker for Russian culture, clothing, etc. Her 80th birthday celebration was noticed in the society pages of the Miami Daily Herald.

Sophie spent the last seven years of her life in the Washington D.C. Home For Incurables. At her 100th birthday party, 40 guests, including 3 nieces, attended.

Letters to her niece Edith Lovell (Coyle) Matthes, wife of François E. Matthes, are stored in the François Matthes papers collection, Carton 3, Folder 51, in the Bancroft Library at University of California, Berkeley.

Letters to historian and writer Julia Keese Colles are stored in the Colles Family Papers, Box 4, Folder 37, in the Morristown and Morris Township Library.
