= John Johns Trigg =

American politician (1748–1804)

Member of the U.S. House of Representatives from Virginia's 13th district
- In office March 4, 1803 – May 17, 1804
- Preceded by: John Clopton
- Succeeded by: Christopher H. Clark

Member of the U.S. House of Representatives from Virginia's 5th district
- In office March 4, 1797 – March 4, 1803
- Preceded by: George Hancock
- Succeeded by: Thomas Lewis, Jr.

Member of the Virginia Senate from Franklin, Bedford, Henry, Patrick, Campbell and Pittsylvania Counties
- In office 1792–1796
- Preceded by: Robert Clarke
- Succeeded by: George Penn

Member of the Virginia House of Delegates from Bedford County
- In office 1784–1791; Alongside Robert Clarke, William Leftwich, James Turner, Christopher Clark and David Saunders

Personal details
- Born: 1748 Lunenburg County, Virginia Colony, British America
- Died: May 17, 1804 (aged 55–56) Bedford County, Virginia, U.S.
- Party: Democratic-Republican
- Other political affiliations: Anti-Federalist
- Spouse: Dianna Ayers
- Children: 7

Military service
- Branch/service: Virginia State Militia
- Years of service: 1775–1802
- Rank: Major
- Battles/wars: American Revolutionary War; *Siege of Yorktown

John Johns Trigg (1748 – May 17, 1804) was an American planter and politician from Bedford County, Virginia who served in both houses of the Virginia General Assembly after fighting as a Virginia militiaman in the Revolutionary War, then served in the U.S. Congress from 1797 until his death.

== Early life and education ==
John was born on his father's farm near New London in the Colony of Virginia, specifically in the part of Lunenburg County that became Bedford County in his youth. He was one of the eight children of William Trigg (1716 – 1773) and Mary (Johns) Trigg (1720 – 1773). His father, William served as a judge in Bedford County (which was formed from part of Lunenburg County in 1754) for many years. His brother, Abram, would serve with him in congress, and another brother, Stephen Trigg, who went to Kentucky as a land commissioner, died there in the Battle of Blue Lick. Yet another brother, William Trigg, would father Connally Findlay Trigg and William Robertston Trigg. His grandfather, Abraham Trigg, emigrated from Cornwall around 1710. His maternal Johns ancestors also arrived in Virginia from England in the mid-seventeenth century.

== American Revolutionary War ==
Virginia expanded her militia as the conflict with Great Britain loomed. Trigg helped raise a new militia company in Bedford County in 1775 and became one of its offices, with the rank of lieutenant. He remained with this unit throughout the war, and saw several local actions. He was promoted him to captain on March 23, 1778, and attained the rank of major in 1781. As a major of artillery at the Siege of Yorktown later that year, Trigg was present at the surrender of Lord Cornwallis.

After the war Trigg continued his service in the Virginia militia. He was promoted to lieutenant colonel in 1791, and in 1793 served as a major in the Second Battalion of the Tenth Regiment of the Virginia militia. In 1796 and 1802, he commanded the 91st Regiment of the Virginia militia.

== Political career ==
Around 1781 Trigg became a Justice of the Peace in Bedford County, the justices collectively in that era also governing the county. Bedford voters elected him as one of their representatives in the Virginia House of Delegates, and re-elected him several times so he served (part-time) from 1784 until 1792. In 1788 he represented Bedford County in the Virginia Convention that ratified the U.S. Constitution. However, Trigg voted with Patrick Henry and the Antifederalists against ratification. He served in the Virginia Senate from 1792 until 1796.

He was elected in the United States House of Representatives in 1796 as a Jeffersonian Republican. Trigg was re-elected three times, and served in the Congress from 1797. Trigg arrived on the second day the Fifth Congress of the United States convened, Tuesday, May 16, 1797, and was in time to hear the new President's speech to Congress about his position in regards to France. At this time, Trigg, a Democratic-Republican/Anti-Federalist was in the minority party, as the House was majority Federalist, as was John Adams, the President of the United States. After the President's speech, which caused an uproar among Anti-Federalists as not being sympathetic enough to France and too hawkish, the House debated until May 31 on their response to his address. Their response, with an amendment, basically supported the President's speech. Trigg voted against the response, while his brother Abram voted for it.

Other votes during this session:

- Yea: June 24 - "An act providing a Naval Armament"
- Nay: July 3 - Stamp Duties
- Nay: July 5 - Duty on Salt

When the second session for this Congress returned in November, Trigg arrived three days late on November 16, 1797.

Votes during this session:

- Nay: May 18 - Establishing a Provisional Army

== Planter ==
Like his father, brothers and others of his class, Trigg farmed using enslaved labor. In the 1787 Virginia tax census, he owned nine enslaved teenagers, eight enslaved adults, six horses, a two wheeled carriage and 40 cattle in Bedford county, where William Trigg (possibly his father or brother) owned eight teenage slaves, eight adult slaves, ten horses and 33 cattle. This John Trigg may not be the nonresident of Berkeley County on Virginia's northern border who paid taxes on two horses and two other livestock but no slaves.

== Personal life ==
John married Dianna Ayers on December 17, 1770, and they settled on their own plantation "Old Liberty" near what became the town of Liberty (now Bedford, Virginia). The family would grow to include seven children: Stephen, William, Nancy, Daniel, Theodosia, John Johns Jr., and Mary (Polly).

== Death and legacy ==
Trigg died at his Bedford County home on May 17, 1804, and was buried in a family plot there. His widow, Dianna, survived her husband by at least three years.

=== Electoral history ===
- 1797; Trigg was elected to the U.S. House of Representatives unopposed.
- 1799; Trigg was re-elected with 98.31% of the vote, defeating Federalist George Hancock.
- 1801; Trigg was re-elected unopposed.

== See also ==
- List of members of the United States Congress who died in office (1790–1899)

== Notes ==
U.S. House of Representatives
Preceded by George Hancock	Member of the U.S. House of Representatives from Virginia's 13th congressional district 1797–1803	Succeeded by Thomas Lewis, Jr.
Preceded by John Clopton	Member of the U.S. House of Representatives from Virginia's 5th congressional district 1803–1804	Succeeded by Christopher H. Clark
