= Pompey Callaway House =

Historic house in Virginia, United States

- U.S. National Register of Historic Places
- Virginia Landmarks Register
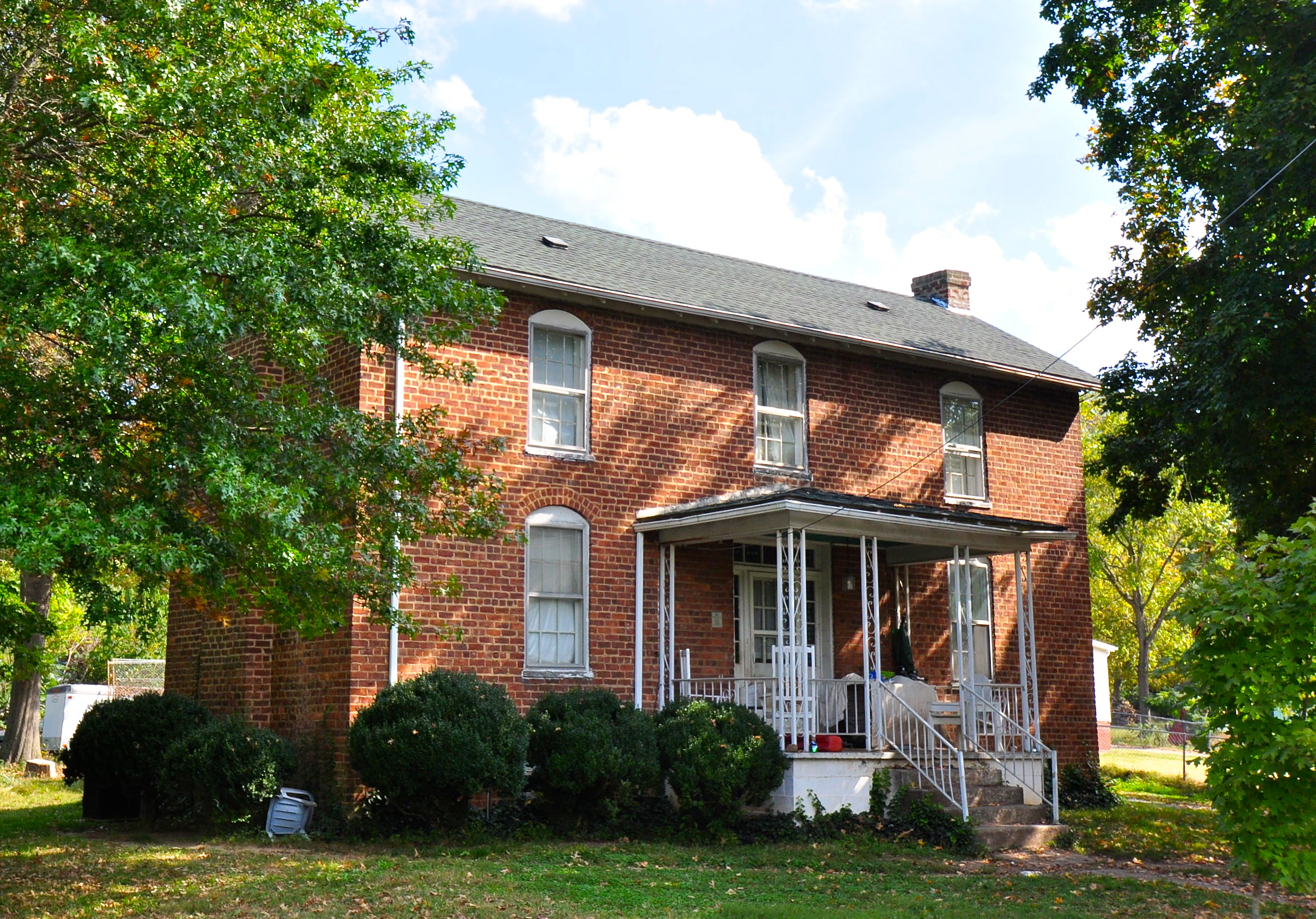
- Pompey Callaway House, October 2013

- Location within Virginia Location within the United States
- Location: VA 754, 0.2 miles (0.32 km) east of US 460, near Elliston, Virginia
- Coordinates: 37°12′59″N 80°13′48″W
- Area: less than one acre
- Built: c. 1910
- Built by: Callaway, Pompey
- Architectural style: Single-pile center-passage
- MPS: Montgomery County MPS
- NRHP reference No.: 89001811
- VLR No.: 060-0434

Significant dates
- Added to NRHP: November 13, 1989
- Designated VLR: June 20, 1989

Pompey Callaway House is a historic home located near Elliston, Montgomery County, Virginia, United States. The house was built about 1910, and is a two-story, three-bay brick dwelling with a single pile central passage plan. Its builder, Pompey Callaway, was an ex-slave from Franklin County. It is one of the most substantial houses built for an African-American owner in Montgomery County before 1920.

It was listed on the National Register of Historic Places in 1989.
