= George Hancock (Virginia politician) =

American politician

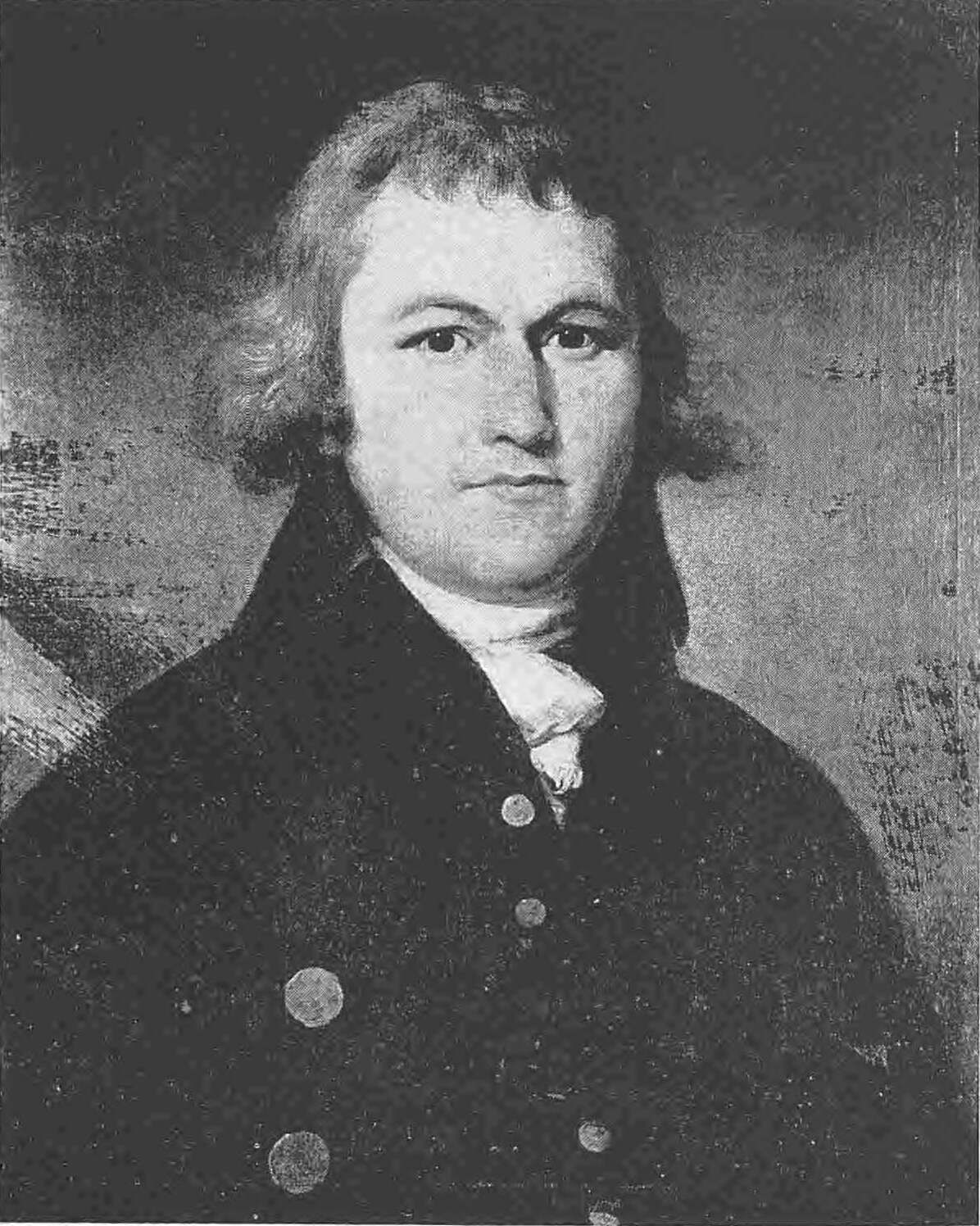
- portrait by Charles Willson Peale, 1794

Member of the U.S. House of Representatives from Virginia's 5th district
- In office March 4, 1793 – March 4, 1797
- Preceded by: James Madison
- Succeeded by: John J. Trigg

Member of the Virginia House of Delegates from Botetourt County
- In office 1792; Alongside Martin McFerran
- In office 1784–1786; Alongside Archibald Stuart, Martin McFerran

Personal details
- Born: June 13, 1754 Chesterfield County, Virginia Colony, British America
- Died: July 18, 1820 (aged 66) Fotheringay, Virginia, U.S.
- Resting place: "Fotheringay," Elliston, Virginia
- Party: Federalist
- Spouse: Margaret Hancock
- Children: Julia Hancock
- Profession: Planter, lawyer

Military service
- Branch/service: Continental Army; Virginia State Militia
- Years of service: 1776–1780; 1785
- Rank: Colonel
- Unit: Virginia Line; Botetourt County Militia
- Battles/wars: American Revolutionary War; *Siege of Savannah

George Hancock (June 13, 1754 – July 18, 1820) was an American planter, lawyer, and slave owner from Virginia. He represented Virginia as a Federalist in the U.S. House from 1793 to 1797.

== Biography ==
He was born in Chesterfield County in the Colony of Virginia to George and Mary (Jones) Hancock. George Hancock was appointed a colonel in the Virginia militia, where he served as aide de camp to Count Casimir Pulaski. When General Pulaski was mortally wounded at the battle of Savannah, it was Colonel Hancock that pulled the general off of his horse. George Hancock married Margaret Strother in 1781. It was in that year that Hancock purchased 300 acres in and around Fincastle, Virginia, that was to become Santillane. Work began in 1795 on Santillane using George Hancock's slaves. The exterior was completed around 1800 using bricks fired on site. The interior was probably completed a couple of years later. The first documented reference to the residence as "Satillane", was on a letter head dated 1805 that was sent by Margaret Hancock. George and Margaret Hancock's daughter, Julia, married General William Clark at Santillane on January 5, 1808, upon his return from exploring the Louisiana Territory with Meriwether Lewis. The newlyweds lived left Santillane in the spring of 1808 for St. Louis, so General Clark could become the Superintendent of Indian Affairs and Commander of Militia in the Missouri/Louisiana territory. Sometime in 1811, a roof fire began at Santillane. Though it's unknown how extreme the damage was to the house, it must have been enough for the family to evacuate. Hancock, along with his wife Peggy and son George moved on to Fotheringay, selling Santillane to Henry Bowyer.

In 1796, Hancock purchased the Fotheringay property near Elliston, Virginia. The Fotheringay house was listed on the National Register of Historic Places in 1969.

== Electoral history ==
Hancock was the Federalist candidate for Virginia's 3rd congressional district in 1789, beating Andrew Moore with 84.2% of the vote. In 1793, Hancock was elected to the 5th congressional district with 60.47% of the vote, defeating Independents Caleb Munsey and Charles Clay. He was re-elected unopposed in 1795. He was one of nine representatives to vote against the Eleventh Amendment to the United States Constitution.

U.S. House of Representatives
Preceded by James Madison	Member of the U.S. House of Representatives from Virginia's 5th congressional district 1793–1797	Succeeded by John J. Trigg
