= Matthes Glaciers =

Glacier in the Sierra Nevada of California

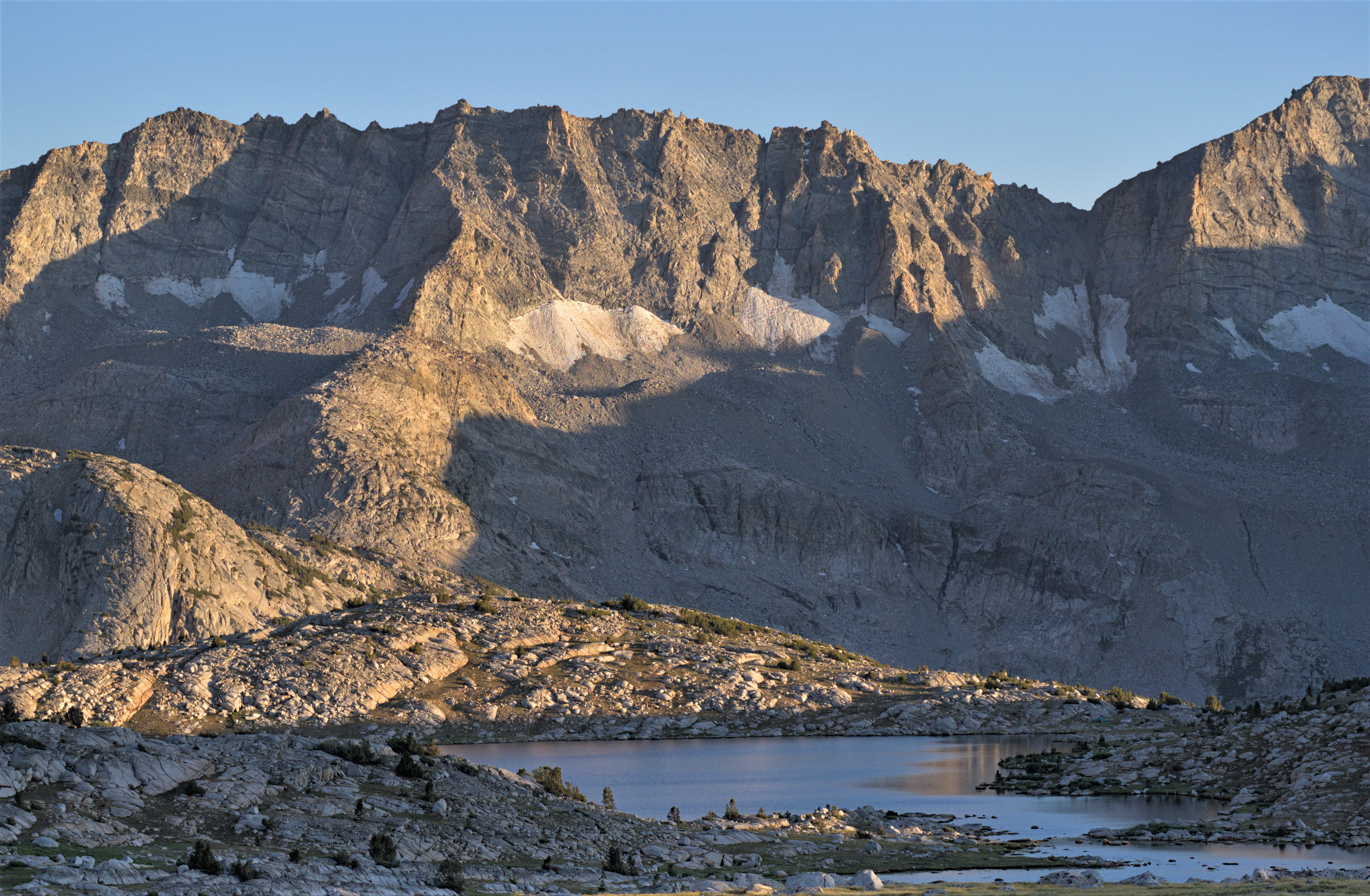
- Matthes Glaciers, from Tomahawk Lake

- Location within California
- Type: Mountain glacier
- Location: Sierra National Forest, Fresno County, California, U.S.
- Coordinates: 37°13′40″N 118°45′33″W
- Length: .10 mi (0.16 km)
- Terminus: Barren rock
- Status: Retreating

The Matthes Glaciers are a group of glaciers east of the Glacier Divide in the Sierra Nevada, in the U.S. state of California. The glaciers were named for François E. Matthes. There are approximately 10 small glacierets situated above 12,200 feet (3,700 m) in the John Muir Wilderness of Sierra National Forest which comprise the Matthes Glaciers.

== See also ==
- List of glaciers in the United States
