= Elliston, Virginia =

- CDP
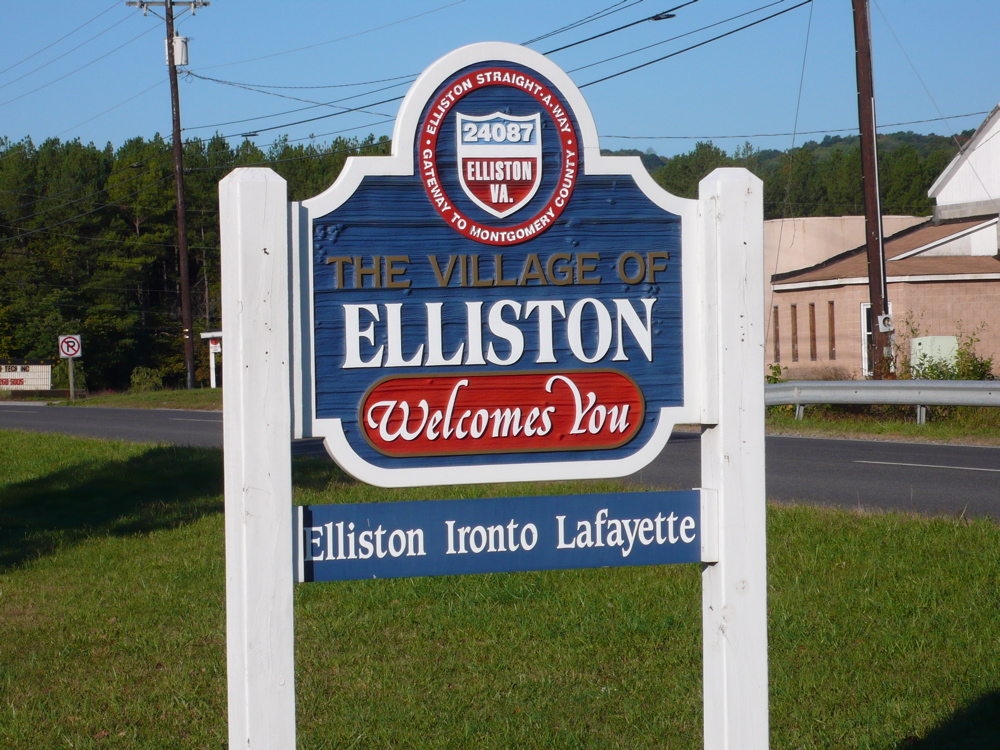
- Welcome signage along U.S. 11

- Location within the Commonwealth of Virginia Elliston, Virginia (the United States)
- Coordinates: 37°12′59″N 80°13′57″W
- Country: United States
- State: Virginia
- County: Montgomery
- Elevation: 1,263 ft (385 m)

Population (2020)
  - Total: 855
- Time zone: UTC−5 (Eastern (EST))
  - Summer (DST): UTC−4 (EDT)
- ZIP codes: 24087
- Area code: 540
- GNIS feature ID: 1494218

Elliston is a census-designated place (CDP) in Montgomery County, Virginia, United States. It lies between the city of Roanoke and the town of Christiansburg in the southwestern part of the state. As of the 2020 census, Elliston had a population of 855. It is home to a small fire department, an elementary school, two gas stations, a train stop, and several churches. Most of its residents commute to larger towns. A set of railroad tracks separates the northwestern part of the town from the rest. US highway 11-460 further divides the town into two distinct neighborhoods, "Oldtown," which formed along the Valley Road in the 1850s, and "The Brake," a predominantly African-American area that developed after the Civil War.

Originally known as Big Spring, the town's depot was an important stopping point on the Virginia and Tennessee Railroad and later the Norfolk and Western. In the late 1880s, investors hoped to create a large industrial and railroad center there, to be known as Carnegie City. Instead, the railroad chose the Roanoke County town of Big Lick, later Roanoke, as the location for its main shops.

The Barnett House, Big Spring Baptist Church, Pompey Callaway House, Fotheringay, and Madison Farm Historic and Archeological District are listed on the National Register of Historic Places in 1989.

== Demographics ==
Historical population
Census	Pop.	Note	%±
2010	902		—
2020	855		−5.2%
U.S. Decennial Census; 2010 2020

Elliston was first listed as a census designated place in the 2010 U.S. census formed from part of deleted Elliston-Lafayette CDP and additional area.
