= Fotheringay (Elliston, Virginia) =

Historic house in Virginia, United States

- U.S. National Register of Historic Places
- Virginia Landmarks Register
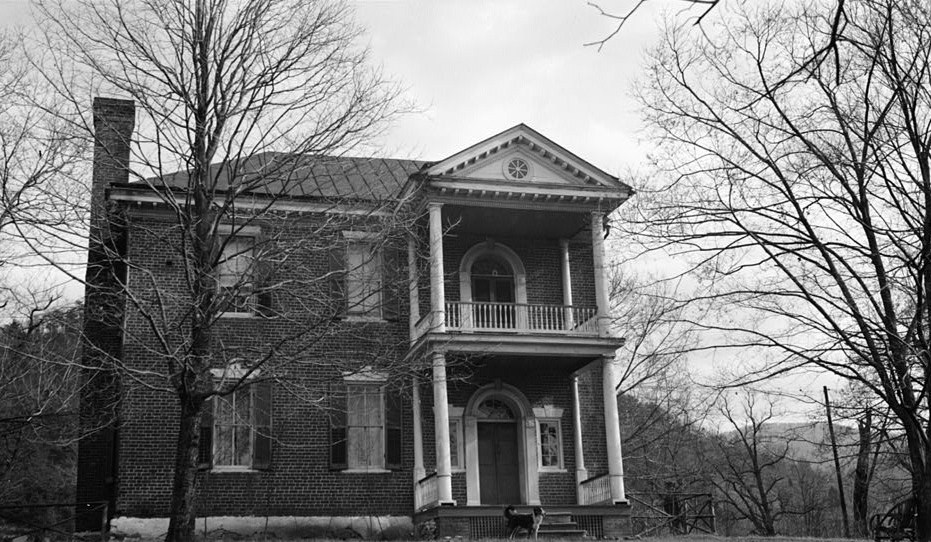
- Fotheringay, HABS Photo

- Location within Virginia Location within the United States
- Location: East of the junction of Rte. 11 and Graham St., near Elliston, Virginia
- Coordinates: 37°11′24.85″N 80°13′56.70″W
- Area: 188.1 acres (76.1 ha)
- Built: c. 1796
- NRHP reference No.: 69000262
- VLR No.: 060-0005

Significant dates
- Added to NRHP: November 12, 1969
- Designated VLR: May 13, 1969

Fotheringay is a historic plantation home located near Elliston, Montgomery County, Virginia. The house was built about 1796, and is a two-story, five bay brick dwelling with a hipped roof and deep two-story rear ell. It features a projecting two-level provincial type portico. The house was originally built as a three bay dwelling with the portico on the southernmost bay. It was expanded to the full five bays in the 1950s. It was the home of Col. George Hancock The home was built by slaves and the bricks were fired on site. Hancock is entombed in a triangular vault on site. He is rumored to be in the upright position looking over his slaves. The next owner, Henry Edmundson (June 14, 1814 – December 16, 1890), was an American lawyer, congressman, farmer, slave owner and Confederate officer. He is also buried in a private cemetery on the land.

It was listed on the National Register of Historic Places in 1969.
