= Santillane =

Historic house in Virginia, United States

- U.S. National Register of Historic Places
- Virginia Landmarks Register
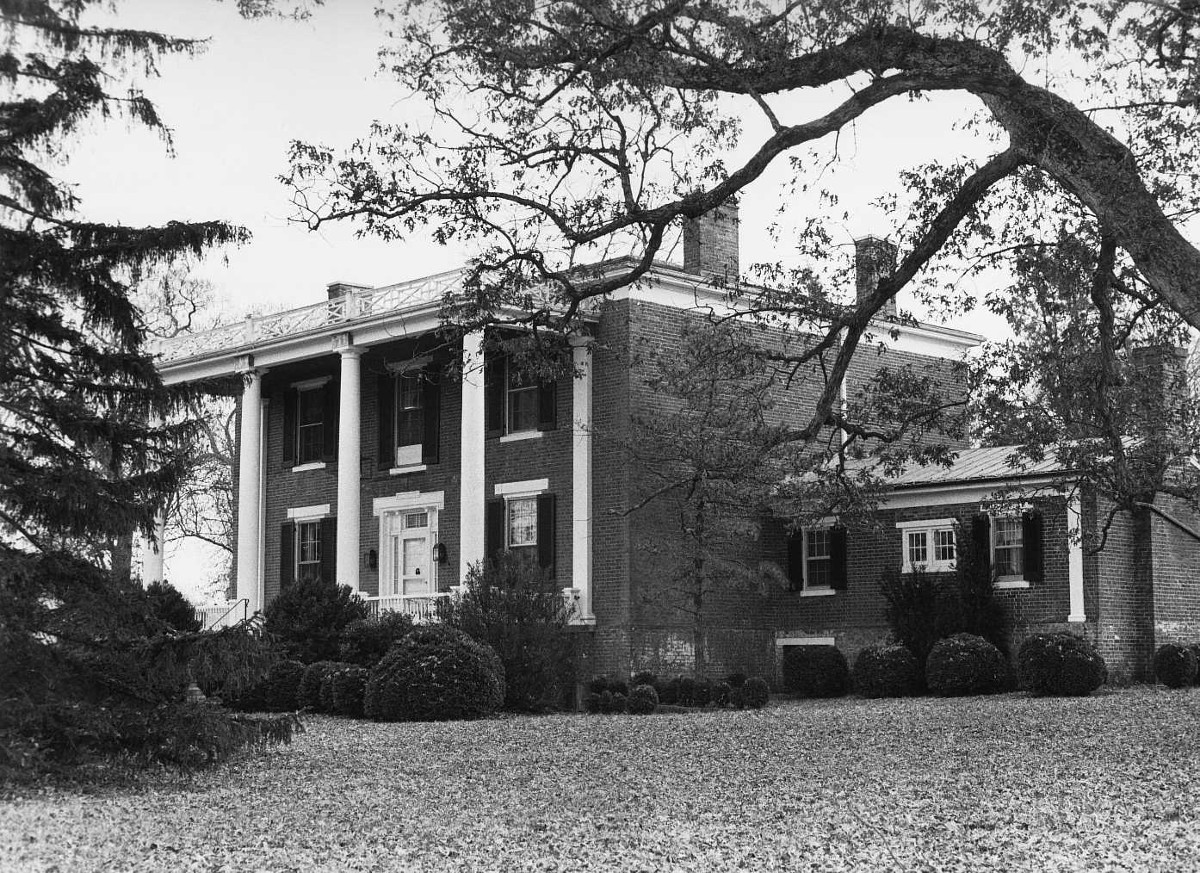

- Location within Virginia Location within the United States
- Location: W of U.S. 220, near Fincastle, Virginia
- Coordinates: 37°29′37″N 79°52′52″W
- Area: 35 acres (14 ha)
- Built: 1795
- Architectural style: Greek Revival
- NRHP reference No.: 74002107
- VLR No.: 011-0032

Significant dates
- Added to NRHP: July 24, 1974
- Designated VLR: January 15, 1974

Santillane is a historic home located near Fincastle, Botetourt County, Virginia. It was built in 1795, and consists of a two-story high, three bay by four bay, main block with a one-story, rear kitchen wing. It is constructed of brick and is in the Greek Revival style. The house has a shallow hipped roof and tetrastyle two-story front portico dated to the early 20th century. Also on the property is a contributing stone spring house. The house stands on a tract purchased by Colonel George Hancock (1754–1820) in 1795. The kitchen wing may date to his period of ownership.

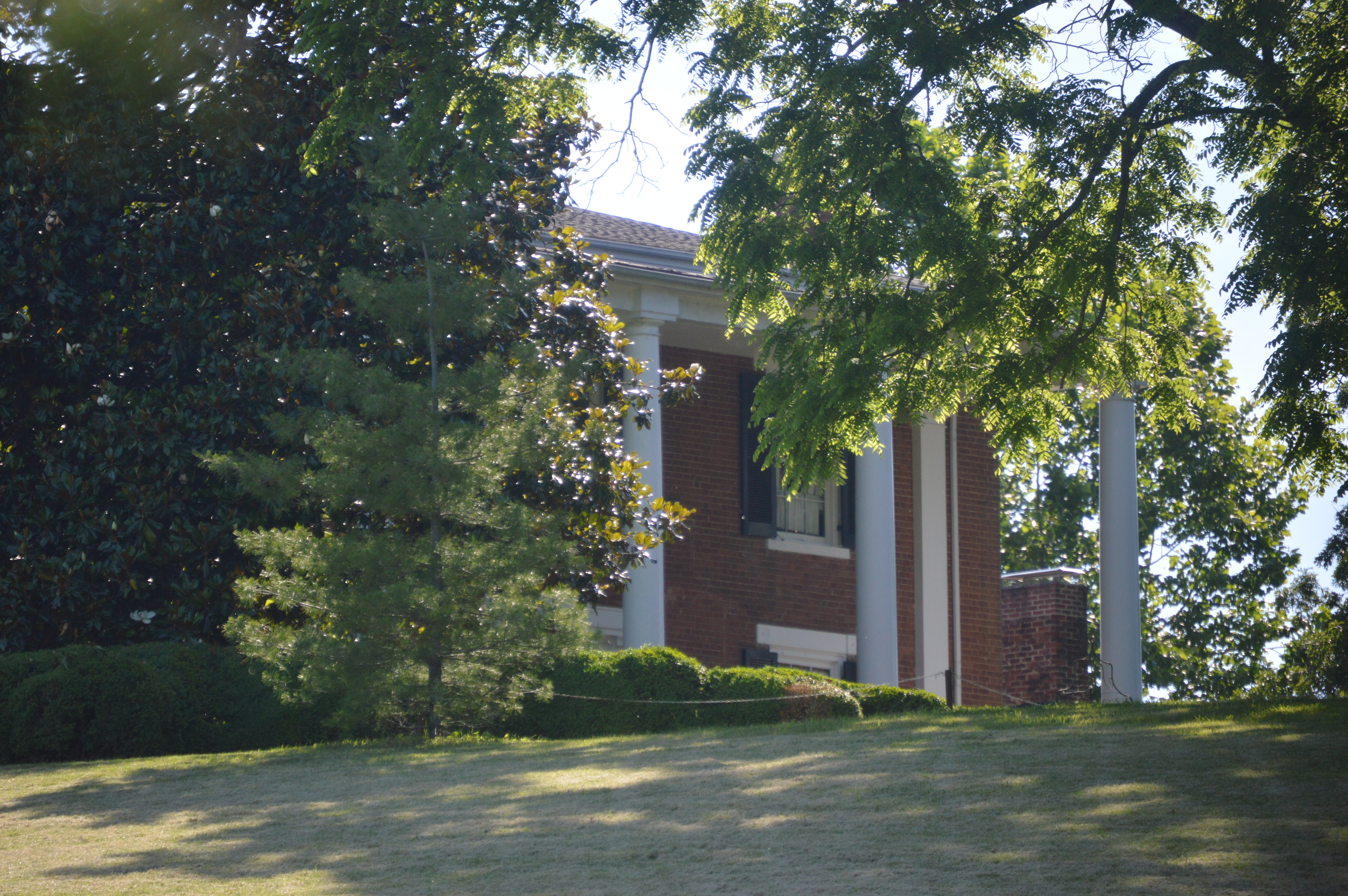
Santillane's front

It was listed on the National Register of Historic Places in 1974.
