= Big Spring Baptist Church (Elliston, Virginia) =

Historic church in Virginia, United States

- U.S. National Register of Historic Places
- Virginia Landmarks Register
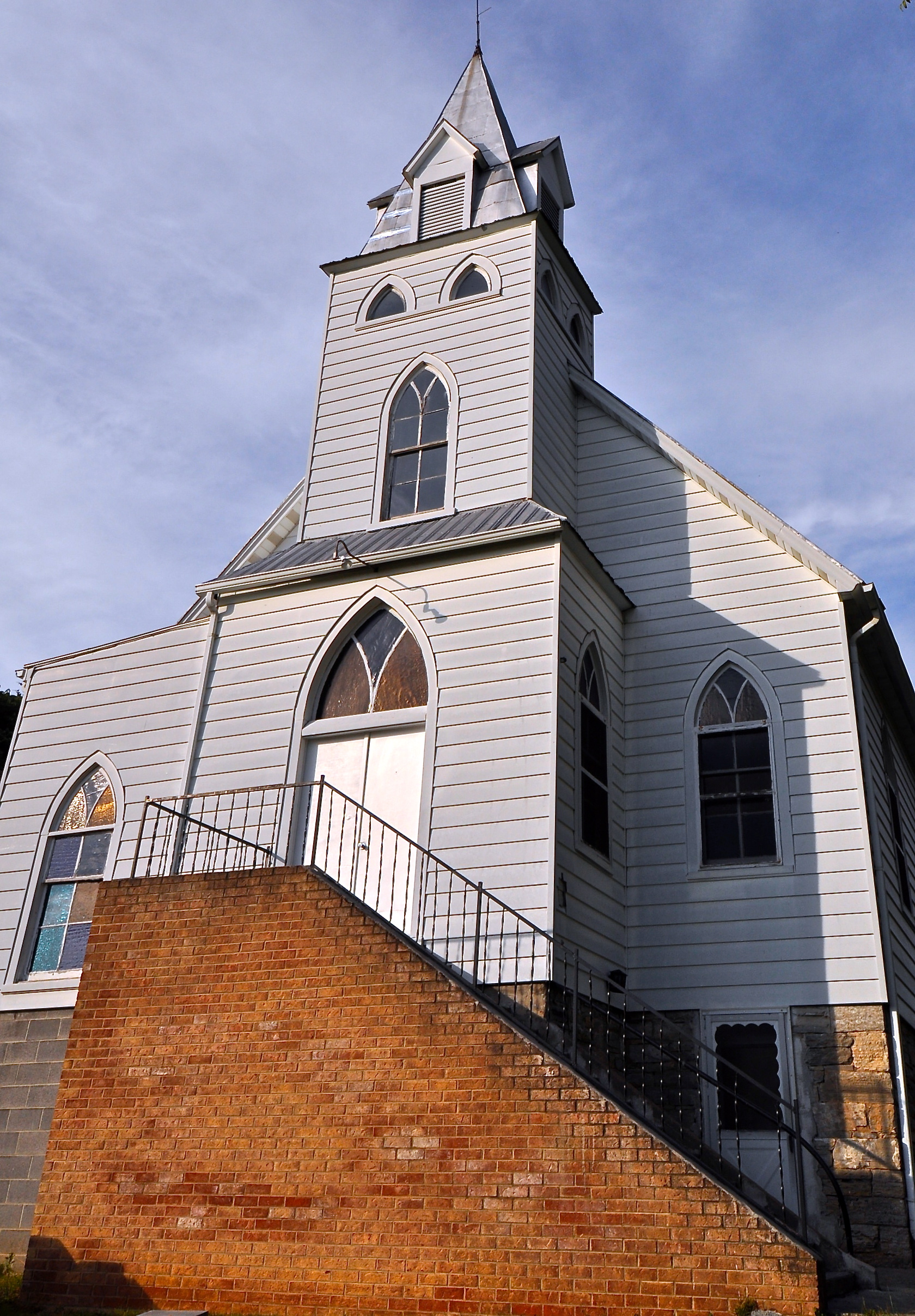
- Big Spring Baptist Church, September 2013

- Location within Virginia Location within the United States
- Location: VA 631, 0.1 mi. E of US 460/11, Elliston, Virginia
- Coordinates: 37°12′55″N 80°13′30″W
- Area: 4 acres (1.6 ha)
- Built: c. 1880
- Built by: Pepper, Joseph
- Architectural style: Nave plan
- MPS: Montgomery County MPS
- NRHP reference No.: 89001809
- VLR No.: 060-0435

Significant dates
- Added to NRHP: November 13, 1989
- Designated VLR: June 20, 1989

Big Spring Baptist Church, also known as First Baptist Church, is a historic Baptist church building located near Elliston, Montgomery County, Virginia. It was built about 1880, and is a one-story, four-bay, nave plan frame structure with a high gable roof. It features a projecting three-stage central tower. Also on the property is the contributing church cemetery where the deceased members of most of the area's African-American families are buried.

It was listed on the National Register of Historic Places in 1989.
