= François E. Matthes =

American geologist

François Émile Matthes
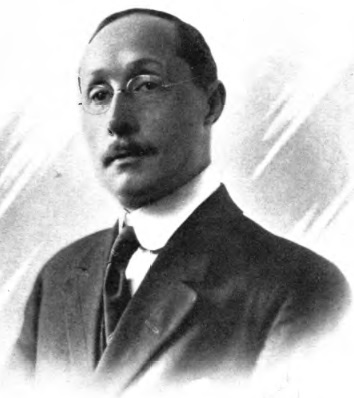
- Born: March 16, 1874; Amsterdam, Netherlands
- Died: June 21, 1948 (aged 74); El Cerrito, California, US
- Resting place: Yosemite National Park
- Education: Massachusetts Institute of Technology
- Occupation: Geologist
- Spouse: Edith Lovell (Coyle) Matthes
- Relatives: Gerard H. Matthes
- Writing career
- Language: English; German; Dutch; French
- Notable works: Geologic History of the Yosemite Valley; Glacial Sculpture of the Bighorn Mountains, Wyoming; Sequoia National Park, a Geological Album; Mount Rainier and its glaciers

François Émile Matthes (March 16, 1874 – June 21, 1948) was a geologist and an expert in topographic mapping, glaciers, and climate change. He mapped remote areas of the American West for the United States Geological Survey (USGS). His maps coincided with the development of those areas into national parks. He is one of the founders of the Association of American Geographers and served as its president. Matthes resolved a dispute about formation of the Yosemite Valley and his findings on glaciers introduced the terms nivation and Little Ice Age.

== Childhood ==
Fraternal twins François and Gerard were born March 16, 1874, in Amsterdam, the Netherlands, to distinguished parents. Their father, Willem Ernst Matthes [1842 - 1906], was a partner in the successful firm of Matthes and Bormeester, importers of colonial rubber, indigo and hemp from the Dutch East Indies. He was also a director of Natura Artis Magistra, president of Felix Meritis, founder of a riding academy and Lieutenant Colonel for the National Guard artillery unit in Amsterdam. François's mother, Jonkvrouw Johanna Susanna (van der Does de Bije) Matthes [1851 - 1934], was a descendant of Jan van der Does, who had led the resistance against the Spanish during the Siege of Leiden.

The couple had married in Amsterdam December 29, 1871. Their home was a mansion on the Heeren Gracht near Vijzelstraat. The twins were their only children.

During a vacation at Biarritz in France, the boys discovered that boulders strewn along the shore contained fossils. They broke open rocks with small hammers and carried their favorite fossils back to their room. When it came time to depart for home, their collection had grown so heavy that their mother insisted it all be left.

At a young age, both boys were instructed in technical drawing with pencil, charcoal and ink on tracing linen with T-square and triangle. The art of Frederic Remington was a drawing inspiration to François, as his surviving sketch books attest with pages of animals, in particular horses.

Around age eight, the boys exhibited symptoms of malaria. The disease was common in Amsterdam from mosquitoes freely breeding in the canals but the vector relationship was not yet understood. The family doctor recommended that the boys be removed for a few years to recover up into the Alps. The decision to go turned into their permanent departure from their Amsterdam home.

During breaks from school over the next years, the family would vacation at various alpine resorts. One momentous destination for François was Bossons Glacier at Mont Blanc. Willem, during short visits, also taught the boys mountaineering and their favorite climb was Dent de Jaman. A gift of General Dufour series cloth-mounted military maps came with their father's personal training. They would orient with the maps during excursions into the mountains to collect insects.

== Education ==
In 1884, the twins left for Switzerland with their mother to attend a school for foreign students at Courgevaux. They took residence for a year in a wing of a nearby castle and learned the French language. During the next two years (1885–87) they relocated to Montreux where they included German language among their classes to prepare for studies in Frankfurt, Germany. At Frankfurt, the boys acquired their fourth language, English. Willem had directed his sons to learn "live" languages and avoid both Latin and Ancient Greek.

The boys attended the technical high school Klingerschule and were lodged at the residence of one their instructors with four other classmates. They took courses fundamental to their anticipated engineering degrees from a German university. A visiting Harvard professor persuaded both boys to go instead to the United States.

In September, 1891 the brothers embarked to the United States but a violent storm disabled their ship. They arrived in New York days behind schedule. The semester was in progress when they sought admission to Massachusetts Institute of Technology. When their entrance exam scores indicated the brothers were only deficient in American history, President Francis Walker intervened on their behalf and entered them into a civil engineering curriculum. François reciprocated Walker's aid by writing a tribute, The Military Career of General Walker, for the college yearbook.

A professor, who had been affiliated with the United States Coast and Geodetic Survey, steered the brothers into taking geodetic courses.

Their newest language English presented no obstacle. They delivered oral presentations to the school's Civil Engineering Society. François spoke on topics such as Draining of the Zuiderzee and Use of Mattresses in Dike Construction. Both boys were also active members of the Agassiz Association of Boston due to their interests in entomology. They donated their collection of insects from Switzerland to the Boston Society of Natural History. Among talks François delivered to the group were Coleoptera, Parasitic Insects and Insect Life in Water.

During the 1892 summer break, both brothers vacationed in the White Mountains resuming their alpine pastimes - camping, mountaineering, orienteering, collecting insects. Through the summer of 1893, they were employed by an insurance company to make drawings of various industrial fire-protection equipment. They also travelled to Chicago to visit the World's Columbian Exposition. For the summer of 1894 they attended a M.I.T. field school in the Adirondack Mountains learning to map with an alidade and plane table and to measure stream flow of the Ausable River with various current meters.

Graduation for the brothers on May 28, 1895, came with honors and a Bachelor of Science degree. In 1896, both became citizens of the United States.

== Topographic Years ==
On June 1, 1895, Matthes started his first job as an instrument man and draftsman for the city engineer's office of Rutland, Vermont. He helped create detailed topographic surveys within the city.

One year later, he joined the United States Geological Survey and remained for the next fifty-one years until his retirement. From June 1, 1896, through November 1, 1896, he remained in New England as a traverse man. He then was promoted to field assistant and worked in the Indian Territory (now Oklahoma). For a time, he performed as the acting head draftsman, in charge of revision work in the field. On April 1, 1898, after passing the federal Civil Service examination, he advanced in grade to assistant topographer.

The Geological Survey had determined to map little known remote areas of the western United States and Matthes' assignments over the next years were:

- 1898: during summer, resumed the survey, started by H.S. Wallace, of the Cloud Peak quadrangle in Wyoming.
- 1899: during summer, finished the Cloud Peak quadrangle in Wyoming.
- 1900: during spring, a hydrographic reconnaissance of the Blackfoot Indian Reservation in Montana.
- 1900: during summer, the Chief Mountain quadrangle in Montana.
- 1900-01: during winter, the Bradshaw Mountains quadrangle in Arizona.
- 1901: during summer, the Browning quadrangle in Montana.
- 1902: during summer, started the Grand Canyon quadrangle in Arizona.
- 1902-03: during winter, the Jerome quadrangle in Arizona.
- 1903: during summer, completed the Grand Canyon quadrangle in Arizona.
- 1904: Matthes began a postgraduate degree in geology at Harvard University, majoring in geomorphology under Professor William Morris Davis. He also lectured under an Austin Teaching Fellowship about topographic methods to advanced geology students.
- 1905: during spring, with only a few weeks left to complete his degree, Matthes was offered the opportunity to map the Yosemite Valley in California. Due to the short season for field work in the Sierra Nevada mountain range, Matthes immediately accepted the assignment and abandoned his degree.
- 1905: during summer, started the Yosemite quadrangle, which presented him with more difficulties than had the Grand Canyon.
- 1906: during spring, Matthes was assigned to Berkeley, California, to assist Grove Karl Gilbert study transportation of sediment in rivers. On April 18, both men witnessed the devastation across the bay caused by the San Francisco earthquake. Their study postponed, Gilbert was appointed to the California State Earthquake Investigating Commission and directed Matthes to map the San Andreas Fault. His maps were published by the commission in their two volume findings.
- 1906: during summer, completed Yosemite quadrangle.
- 1907-13: through these years, Matthes served as Inspector of Topographic Surveys for the Western United States. He would, during summer, visit the scattered field parties and, during winter, supervise the drafting and inking of their field manuscripts in Washington, D.C.
- 1910: during summer, started the Mount Rainier quadrant in Washington.
- 1911: during summer, continued Mount Rainier, but completed only the southwestern quarter due to poor visibility from bad weather and forest fires. That was his last major field assignment for the Topographic Branch.

As party chief at the Wyoming quadrangle, Matthes' effectively organized his crew and equipment for long pack trips through remote areas, physically strenuous to access and traverse. His techniques in working the alidade and plane table "contributed notably to the effectiveness of mapping rugged mountain areas". On July 1, 1899, he was promoted to the rank of full topographer.

Matthes believed topographers should not merely draw lines but also study the geology of the land forms to produce relevant maps. To that end, Matthes wrote his first scientific publication during the winter of 1899 entitled Glacial Sculpture of the Bighorn Mountains, Wyoming which served as a standard reference and in which Matthes applied the first usage of the term "nivation". His geologic writing was not a customary effort for topographers and his descriptive style was critiqued by the USGS but the popularity of his narratives continues today.

== Marriage ==
Edith Lovell Coyle [September 18, 1879 – January 4, 1963 (aged 83)] was born and raised in Washington, DC. Her father was Randolph Coyle [September 21, 1843 – January 4, 1891 (aged 47)] who had served as Assistant District Attorney for the District of Columbia until his death. Her mother Mary Lovell (Radford) Coyle [August 25, 1849 – October 7, 1929 (aged 80)] was the daughter of Rear Admiral William Radford. Edith's schooling and European travels with her aunt, Sophie Radford de Meissner, allowed conversations with Matthes in German and French as well as English.

François and Edith were married at noon on June 7, 1911. Reverend George Freeland Peter performed a small ceremony at the Washington, D.C., home of Stephen Kearny Radford, uncle to Edith. Walter Mendenhall acted as the best man for Matthes. Later that day, the couple departed for the state of Washington so Matthes could resume mapping Mount Rainier.

Edith accompanied Matthes to his remote expeditions and contributed as his assistant. Normally, their commute to work was by horseback, but when the terrain was not too rugged, she delivered him by car and returned for him in the evening. To alleviate concern for her safety, despite the remoteness, she waited with the doors locked and a geologist's pick beside her for defense.

They had no children.

== Geologic years ==
Matthes had written and lectured about geomorphology during his topographic years. A series of geological essays about the Yosemite Valley which he had contributed to the Sierra Club Bulletin were popular. On July 1, 1913, the Geological survey moved Matthes from the Topographic to the Geographic Branch, the first ever such transfer. During his geologic years, he would still resort to contour lines in his field notes to depict the land forms he studied.

His first assignment and main focus over the next sixteen years was to determine the origin of the Yosemite Valley, a specific request to the USGS from the Sierra Club. Matthes referred to the area as the Incomparable Valley. A formation controversy raged over Josiah Whitney’s block-fault hypothesis and John Muir’s belief that glaciers were largely responsible. In the fall of 1930, Matthes' report Geologic History of the Yosemite Valley (USGS Professional Paper 160) resolved the debate. Professor Kirk Bryan wrote "Occasionally in the history of science there appears a work so excellent, so comprehensive, that it becomes immediately a classic". Demand for this title exceeded any previous USGS Professional Paper and a first printing edition is coveted by collectors.

Special assignments would interrupt his research in the Sierra Nevada Range:

- During World War I he was sent to military sites Camp McClellan, Alabama, and Camp Gordon, Georgia, to describe their geologic environments.
- Just after the war, he participated in the Joseph LeConte lecture series on three consecutive days in Yosemite starting July 8, 1919. The first and third days were conducted at an indoor pavilion but the second lecture was delivered at Glacier Point, 3,200 feet (980 m) above the valley floor.
- From 1928 to 1934, he worked geologic problems along the Mississippi Valley in the Midwestern United States.

As chairman of the Committee on Glaciers of the American Geophysical Union, he began and oversaw a program to collect photographs and measurements of glaciers in the United States. Matthes annually published a detailed summary and analysis of glacial data in the Transactions magazine from 1932 through 1946. The year-to-year changes became an authority for "the elusive record of pre-historic, post-Pleistocene fluctuations of climate".

In 1935 and through 1936, Matthes began reconnaissance of Sequoia National Park in a cooperative assignment with the National Park Service. His data was urgently needed, so pending a later detailed formal report, Matthes summarized his findings in three volumes with his annotated photographs. The Sequoia Albums proved invaluable to the park service but The Geologic History of Mount Whitney was the only other publication he completed from his investigation.

In 1937 Matthes resumed studies in Yosemite and reached the east front of the Sierra Nevada. There, he determined the eastern escarpment had been formed during early Pleistocene faulting, placing the origin more recent than had been previously calculated. He returned to the area over the next two years to gather supporting evidence.

In July 1939 as part of the meeting of the Cordilleran Section of the Geological Society of America, Matthes led an excursion party into the Yosemite Valley and out to the eastern escarpment. That was Matthes' last visit to the Sierra Nevada.

When Matthes returned home to Washington, D.C. in the fall of 1939, the war in Europe had commenced. The International Association for Scientific Hydrology drafted Matthes as their secretary and he also became the secretary of the International Commission of Snow and Glaciers, another division of the Association.

For most of 1941, Matthes wrote a chapter for the Physics of the Earth books series from the National Research Council. His text was cited in the June 1949 edition of the Quarterly Journal by the Royal Meteorological Society as "a masterly summary of the characteristics and behavior of glaciers". In the article, Matthes stated that most of the glaciers in the western United States are not remnants from the Pleistocene Era, as had been previously held, but rather are "modern" and formed within the last 4000 years. He identified this phenomenon as the Little Ice Age.

From 1942 through 1947, Matthes tasks were determined by the Military Geology Unit effort and his English translation skills for European languages. One of his final tasks for the USGS was a re-examination of William Herbert Hobbs's doctrine of a permanent glacial anticyclone situated over the Greenland ice sheet versus the use of Greenland as a military airbase.

== Retirement ==
The statutory retirement age for employees of the Geological Survey is 70 years, but to meet the demands from World War II, Matthes continued an additional three years until his official retirement on June 7, 1947.

François and Edith remained in Washington, D.C., a few more months before traveling by automobile to their new home in El Cerrito, California, high on the Berkeley Hills facing the Golden Gate Bridge. There, Matthes began organizing his works until, in February 1948, he accepted the role of planner for the Committee on Snow and Glaciers sessions to be held as part of the International Scientific Congress scheduled to meet in Ohio in August.

On April 18, 1948, Matthes had a heart attack. He died June 21, 1948, and a candlelight service was conducted at his home four days later. On September 18, 1948, in Yosemite National Park, his ashes were committed to The Incomparable Valley.

== Recognition ==
In 1920 he was decorated Chevalier (Knight), Order of Leopold II by King Albert of Belgium. During the autumn of 1919, Matthes had provided commentary for the King and his party during a tour of the Yosemite Valley.

Matthes was active in the Boy Scouts of America. In 1915, he became the scoutmaster for a Washington, D.C., troop. In 1920, he took a group of Eagle Scouts cross-country to tour Yosemite. In 1931 Matthes was presented the Silver Beaver Award for "distinguished service to boyhood". Surveying was an original merit badge in 1911 and Matthes wrote the mapping section of the Surveying Badge Pamphlet.

In 1933 during the Sixteenth International Geological Congress, an excursion took attendees into the Grand Canyon. The geologists afterwards signed their names to a panoramic view of the canyon and sent it to Matthes with the message "We have been using your maps and have marveled at them. There are no other such topographic maps in all the world."

In 1947 during the commencement ceremony for University of California, Berkeley, he was presented an honorary LL.D. degree by University President Robert Gordon Sproul.

On April 18, 1948, he received the first Distinguished Service Award (DSA) from the United States Department of the Interior which oversees the USGS. The citation reached Matthes a month before his death but his gold medal, with a bison standing before a range of mountain peaks, did not arrive in time. Julius Krug, United States Secretary of the Interior, wrote in the citation "Mr. Matthes made many valuable and exceptionally well-written contributions to glacial geology and geomorphology and became recognized internationally as an outstanding glacial geologist. A bibliography of his published works includes nearly 100 items."

In 1949 the Sierra Club, of which Matthes had served as honorary vice-president, named Matthes Crest and Matthes Lake in his honor.

The Cryosphere Specialty Group of the Association of American Geographers (AAG) sponsors the François Émile Matthes Award. This award was first presented in 2007 and given to meritorious individuals for their Lifetime Time Achievements in Cryospheric Science. Matthes was one of the founders of the AAG, served as its treasurer between 1913 and 1919, and as the president in 1933.

== Selected works ==
- The Incomparable Valley: A Geologic Interpretation of the Yosemite (Includes 24 photographs by Ansel Adams)
- Sequoia National Park, a Geological Album
- The Story of the Yosemite Valley (includes photographs by Frank C. Calkins)
- Geologic History of the Yosemite Valley
- Sketch of Yosemite National Park and an Account of the Origin of the Yosemite and Hetch Hetchy Valleys
- Mount Rainier and its glaciers: Mount Rainier National Park
- The Relation of Geology To Topography (by Douglas Wilson Johnson with Matthes as illustrator comparing examples of good versus bad mapping)

== Legacy ==
Fritiof Fryxell, a geologist and writer, published five volumes from Matthes's uncollected works.

The François Matthes Papers were donated to The Bancroft Library by his widow, Edith Matthes, in 1961. Additions were made in 1961, 1966, and 1973 by Fritiof Fryxell.

In 1879 German sculptor Robert Cauer the Elder was commissioned to carve marble busts of the five-year-old twins. The busts were placed on mahogany pedestals to display in their Amsterdam house. In 1950, Edith Matthes presented the busts to Augustana College in Rock Island, Illinois, where they remain in the collection of the Teaching Museum of Art.

Twin brother Gerard Hendrik Matthes [March 16, 1874 – March 3, 1959 (aged 84)] was a prominent hydrologist over his 45-year career, also with the U.S. Geological Survey.

Geographic locations named for François include:

- Matthes Glacier (Antarctic Peninsula)
- Matthes Glaciers (Sierra National Forest)
- François Matthes Trail (Grand Canyon National Park)
- François Matthes Point (Grand Canyon National Park North Rim)
- Matthes Crest (Yosemite National Park)
- Matthes Lake (Yosemite National Park)
