= Georgia's congressional delegations =

Georgia became a U.S. state in 1788, which allowed it to send congressional delegations to the United States Senate and United States House of Representatives beginning with the 1st United States Congress in 1789. Each state elects two senators to serve for six years, and members of the House to two-year terms.

These are tables of congressional delegations from Georgia to the United States Senate and the United States House of Representatives.

== Current delegation ==
Current U.S. senators from Georgia
Georgia CPVI (2025): R+1	Class II senator	Class III senator
Georgia CPVI (2025): R+1	Jon Ossoff (Senior senator) (Atlanta)	Raphael Warnock (Junior senator) (Atlanta)
Party	Democratic	Democratic
Incumbent since	January 20, 2021	January 20, 2021

Georgia's current congressional delegation in the 119th Congress consists of its two senators, both of whom are Democrats, and its 14 representatives: 9 Republicans and 5 Democrats.

The current dean of the Georgia delegation is Representative Sanford Bishop of the 2nd district, having served in the House since 1993.

Current U.S. representatives from Georgia
District	Member (Residence)	Party	Incumbent since	CPVI (2025)	District map
1st	Buddy Carter (St. Simons)	Republican	January 3, 2015	R+8	-
2nd	Sanford Bishop (Albany)	Democratic	January 3, 1993	D+4	-
3rd	Brian Jack (Peachtree City)	Republican	January 3, 2025	R+15	
4th	Hank Johnson (Lithonia)	Democratic	January 3, 2007	D+27	
5th	Nikema Williams (Atlanta)	Democratic	January 3, 2021	D+36	
6th	Lucy McBath (Marietta)	Democratic	January 3, 2019	D+25	
7th	Rich McCormick (Roswell)	Republican	January 3, 2023	R+11	
8th	Austin Scott (Tifton)	Republican	January 3, 2011	R+15	
9th	Andrew Clyde (Athens)	Republican	January 3, 2021	R+17	
10th	Mike Collins (Jackson)	Republican	January 3, 2023	R+11	
11th	Barry Loudermilk (Cassville)	Republican	January 3, 2015	R+12	
12th	Rick Allen (Augusta)	Republican	January 3, 2015	R+7	
13th	Everton Blair (Lilburn)	Democratic	August 25, 2026	D+21	
14th	Clay Fuller (Lookout Mountain)	Republican	April 7, 2026	R+19	

== United States Senate ==
Class II senator	Congress	Class III senator
William Few (AA)	1st (1789–1791)	James Gunn (AA)
William Few (AA)	2nd (1791–1793)	James Gunn (AA)
James Jackson (AA)	3rd (1793–1795)	James Gunn (AA)
James Jackson (DR)	4th (1795–1797)	James Gunn (F)
George Walton (F)	4th (1795–1797)	James Gunn (F)
Josiah Tattnall (DR)	4th (1795–1797)	James Gunn (F)
Josiah Tattnall (DR)	5th (1797–1799)	James Gunn (F)
Abraham Baldwin (DR)	6th (1799–1801)	James Gunn (F)
Abraham Baldwin (DR)	7th (1801–1803)	James Jackson (DR)
Abraham Baldwin (DR)	8th (1803–1805)	James Jackson (DR)
Abraham Baldwin (DR)	9th (1805–1807)	James Jackson (DR)
Abraham Baldwin (DR)	9th (1805–1807)	John Milledge (DR)
Abraham Baldwin (DR)	10th (1807–1809)	John Milledge (DR)
George Jones (DR)	10th (1807–1809)	John Milledge (DR)
William H. Crawford (DR)	10th (1807–1809)	John Milledge (DR)
William H. Crawford (DR)	11th (1809–1811)	John Milledge (DR)
William H. Crawford (DR)	11th (1809–1811)	Charles Tait (DR)
William H. Crawford (DR)	12th (1811–1813)	Charles Tait (DR)
William H. Crawford (DR)	13th (1813–1815)	Charles Tait (DR)
William B. Bulloch (DR)	13th (1813–1815)	Charles Tait (DR)
William W. Bibb (DR)	13th (1813–1815)	Charles Tait (DR)
William W. Bibb (DR)	14th (1815–1817)	Charles Tait (DR)
George Troup (DR)	14th (1815–1817)	Charles Tait (DR)
George Troup (DR)	15th (1817–1819)	Charles Tait (DR)
John Forsyth (DR)	15th (1817–1819)	Charles Tait (DR)
Freeman Walker (DR)	16th (1819–1821)	John Elliott (DR)
Freeman Walker (DR)	17th (1821–1823)	John Elliott (DR)
Nicholas Ware (DR)	17th (1821–1823)	John Elliott (DR)
Nicholas Ware (DR)	18th (1823–1825)	John Elliott (DR)
Thomas W. Cobb (DR)	18th (1823–1825)	John Elliott (DR)
Thomas W. Cobb (J)	19th (1825–1827)	John M. Berrien (J)
Thomas W. Cobb (J)	20th (1827–1829)	John M. Berrien (J)
Oliver H. Prince (J)	20th (1827–1829)	John M. Berrien (J)
George Troup (J)	21st (1829–1831)	vacant
George Troup (J)	21st (1829–1831)	John Forsyth (J)
George Troup (J)	22nd (1831–1833)	John Forsyth (J)
John Pendleton King (J)	23rd (1833–1835)	John Forsyth (J)
John Pendleton King (J)	24th (1835–1837)	Alfred Cuthbert (J)
John Pendleton King (D)	25th (1837–1839)	Alfred Cuthbert (D)
Wilson Lumpkin (D)	25th (1837–1839)	Alfred Cuthbert (D)
Wilson Lumpkin (D)	26th (1839–1841)	Alfred Cuthbert (D)
John M. Berrien (W)	27th (1841–1843)	Alfred Cuthbert (D)
John M. Berrien (W)	28th (1843–1845)	Walter T. Colquitt (D)
John M. Berrien (W)	29th (1845–1847)	Walter T. Colquitt (D)
John M. Berrien (W)	30th (1847–1849)	Walter T. Colquitt (D)
John M. Berrien (W)	30th (1847–1849)	Herschel V. Johnson (D)
John M. Berrien (W)	31st (1849–1851)	William C. Dawson (W)
John M. Berrien (W)	32nd (1851–1853)	William C. Dawson (W)
Robert M. Charlton (D)	32nd (1851–1853)	William C. Dawson (W)
Robert Toombs (W)	33rd (1853–1855)	William C. Dawson (W)
Robert Toombs (W)	34th (1855–1857)	Alfred Iverson Sr. (D)
Robert Toombs (W)	35th (1857–1859)	Alfred Iverson Sr. (D)
Robert Toombs (W)	36th (1859–1861)	Alfred Iverson Sr. (D)
vacant	36th (1859–1861)	vacant
vacant	37th (1861–1863)	vacant
vacant	38th (1863–1865)	vacant
vacant	39th (1865–1867)	vacant
vacant	40th (1867–1869)	vacant
vacant	41st (1869–1871)	vacant
Homer V. M. Miller (D)	41st (1869–1871)	Joshua Hill (R)
Thomas M. Norwood (D)	42nd (1871–1873)	Joshua Hill (R)
Thomas M. Norwood (D)	43rd (1873–1875)	John B. Gordon (D)
Thomas M. Norwood (D)	44th (1875–1877)	John B. Gordon (D)
Benjamin Harvey Hill (D)	45th (1877–1879)	John B. Gordon (D)
Benjamin Harvey Hill (D)	46th (1879–1881)	John B. Gordon (D)
Benjamin Harvey Hill (D)	46th (1879–1881)	Joseph E. Brown (D)
Benjamin Harvey Hill (D)	47th (1881–1883)	Joseph E. Brown (D)
Pope Barrow (D)	47th (1881–1883)	Joseph E. Brown (D)
Alfred H. Colquitt (D)	48th (1883–1885)	Joseph E. Brown (D)
Alfred H. Colquitt (D)	49th (1885–1887)	Joseph E. Brown (D)
Alfred H. Colquitt (D)	50th (1887–1889)	Joseph E. Brown (D)
Alfred H. Colquitt (D)	51st (1889–1891)	Joseph E. Brown (D)
Alfred H. Colquitt (D)	52nd (1891–1893)	John B. Gordon (D)
Alfred H. Colquitt (D)	53rd (1893–1895)	John B. Gordon (D)
Patrick Walsh (D)	53rd (1893–1895)	John B. Gordon (D)
Augustus O. Bacon (D)	54th (1895–1897)	John B. Gordon (D)
Augustus O. Bacon (D)	55th (1897–1899)	Alexander S. Clay (D)
Augustus O. Bacon (D)	56th (1899–1901)	Alexander S. Clay (D)
Augustus O. Bacon (D)	57th (1901–1903)	Alexander S. Clay (D)
Augustus O. Bacon (D)	58th (1903–1905)	Alexander S. Clay (D)
Augustus O. Bacon (D)	59th (1905–1907)	Alexander S. Clay (D)
Augustus O. Bacon (D)	60th (1907–1909)	Alexander S. Clay (D)
Augustus O. Bacon (D)	61st (1909–1911)	Alexander S. Clay (D)
Augustus O. Bacon (D)	61st (1909–1911)	Joseph M. Terrell (D)
Augustus O. Bacon (D)	62nd (1911–1913)	Joseph M. Terrell (D)
Augustus O. Bacon (D)	62nd (1911–1913)	Hoke Smith (D)
Augustus O. Bacon (D)	63rd (1913–1915)	Hoke Smith (D)
William Stanley West (D)	63rd (1913–1915)	Hoke Smith (D)
Thomas W. Hardwick (D)	63rd (1913–1915)	Hoke Smith (D)
Thomas W. Hardwick (D)	64th (1915–1917)	Hoke Smith (D)
Thomas W. Hardwick (D)	65th (1917–1919)	Hoke Smith (D)
William J. Harris (D)	66th (1919–1921)	Hoke Smith (D)
William J. Harris (D)	67th (1921–1923)	Thomas E. Watson (D)
William J. Harris (D)	67th (1921–1923)	Rebecca Latimer Felton (D)
William J. Harris (D)	67th (1921–1923)	Walter F. George (D)
William J. Harris (D)	68th (1923–1925)	Walter F. George (D)
William J. Harris (D)	69th (1925–1927)	Walter F. George (D)
William J. Harris (D)	70th (1927–1929)	Walter F. George (D)
William J. Harris (D)	71st (1929–1931)	Walter F. George (D)
William J. Harris (D)	72nd (1931–1933)	Walter F. George (D)
John S. Cohen (D)	72nd (1931–1933)	Walter F. George (D)
Richard Russell Jr. (D)	72nd (1931–1933)	Walter F. George (D)
Richard Russell Jr. (D)	73rd (1933–1935)	Walter F. George (D)
Richard Russell Jr. (D)	74th (1935–1937)	Walter F. George (D)
Richard Russell Jr. (D)	75th (1937–1939)	Walter F. George (D)
Richard Russell Jr. (D)	76th (1939–1941)	Walter F. George (D)
Richard Russell Jr. (D)	77th (1941–1943)	Walter F. George (D)
Richard Russell Jr. (D)	78th (1943–1945)	Walter F. George (D)
Richard Russell Jr. (D)	79th (1945–1947)	Walter F. George (D)
Richard Russell Jr. (D)	80th (1947–1949)	Walter F. George (D)
Richard Russell Jr. (D)	81st (1949–1951)	Walter F. George (D)
Richard Russell Jr. (D)	82nd (1951–1953)	Walter F. George (D)
Richard Russell Jr. (D)	83rd (1953–1955)	Walter F. George (D)
Richard Russell Jr. (D)	84th (1955–1957)	Walter F. George (D)
Richard Russell Jr. (D)	85th (1957–1959)	Herman Talmadge (D)
Richard Russell Jr. (D)	86th (1959–1961)	Herman Talmadge (D)
Richard Russell Jr. (D)	87th (1961–1963)	Herman Talmadge (D)
Richard Russell Jr. (D)	88th (1963–1965)	Herman Talmadge (D)
Richard Russell Jr. (D)	89th (1965–1967)	Herman Talmadge (D)
Richard Russell Jr. (D)	90th (1967–1969)	Herman Talmadge (D)
Richard Russell Jr. (D)	91st (1969–1971)	Herman Talmadge (D)
Richard Russell Jr. (D)	92nd (1971–1973)	Herman Talmadge (D)
David H. Gambrell (D)	92nd (1971–1973)	Herman Talmadge (D)
Sam Nunn (D)	92nd (1971–1973)	Herman Talmadge (D)
Sam Nunn (D)	93rd (1973–1975)	Herman Talmadge (D)
Sam Nunn (D)	94th (1975–1977)	Herman Talmadge (D)
Sam Nunn (D)	95th (1977–1979)	Herman Talmadge (D)
Sam Nunn (D)	96th (1979–1981)	Herman Talmadge (D)
Sam Nunn (D)	97th (1981–1983)	Mack Mattingly (R)
Sam Nunn (D)	98th (1983–1985)	Mack Mattingly (R)
Sam Nunn (D)	99th (1985–1987)	Mack Mattingly (R)
Sam Nunn (D)	100th (1987–1989)	Wyche Fowler (D)
Sam Nunn (D)	101st (1989–1991)	Wyche Fowler (D)
Sam Nunn (D)	102nd (1991–1993)	Wyche Fowler (D)
Sam Nunn (D)	103rd (1993–1995)	Paul Coverdell (R)
Sam Nunn (D)	104th (1995–1997)	Paul Coverdell (R)
Max Cleland (D)	105th (1997–1999)	Paul Coverdell (R)
Max Cleland (D)	106th (1999–2001)	Paul Coverdell (R)
Max Cleland (D)	106th (1999–2001)	Zell Miller (D)
Max Cleland (D)	107th (2001–2003)	Zell Miller (D)
Saxby Chambliss (R)	108th (2003–2005)	Zell Miller (D)
Saxby Chambliss (R)	109th (2005–2007)	Johnny Isakson (R)
Saxby Chambliss (R)	110th (2007–2009)	Johnny Isakson (R)
Saxby Chambliss (R)	111th (2009–2011)	Johnny Isakson (R)
Saxby Chambliss (R)	112th (2011–2013)	Johnny Isakson (R)
Saxby Chambliss (R)	113th (2013–2015)	Johnny Isakson (R)
David Perdue (R)	114th (2015–2017)	Johnny Isakson (R)
David Perdue (R)	115th (2017–2019)	Johnny Isakson (R)
David Perdue (R)	116th (2019–2021)	Johnny Isakson (R)
David Perdue (R)	116th (2019–2021)	Kelly Loeffler (R)
Jon Ossoff (D)	117th (2021–2023)	Kelly Loeffler (R)
Jon Ossoff (D)	117th (2021–2023)	Raphael Warnock (D)
Jon Ossoff (D)	118th (2023–2025)	Raphael Warnock (D)
Jon Ossoff (D)	119th (2025–2027)	Raphael Warnock (D)
Jon Ossoff (D)	120th (2027–2029)	Raphael Warnock (D)

== United States House of Representatives ==
=== 1789–1793: 3 districts ===
In the inaugural U.S. Congress, Georgia was apportioned 3 seats as per Article I of the U.S. constitution. Georgia elected the members district wise.

Congress	District		
Congress	1st	2nd	3rd
1st (1789–1791)	James Jackson (AA)	Abraham Baldwin (AA)	George Mathews (AA)
2nd (1791–1793)	Anthony Wayne (AA)	Abraham Baldwin (AA)	Francis Willis (AA)
2nd (1791–1793)	John Milledge (AA)	Abraham Baldwin (AA)	Francis Willis (AA)

=== 1793–1827: at-large seats ===
Following 1790 census, Georgia was apportioned two seats. Following 1800 census, Georgia was apportioned four seats, then 6 seats following 1810 census, and seven seats following 1820 census. From 1793 to 1827 all such seats were elected at-large statewide on a general ticket.

Congress	Elected on a general ticket from Georgia's at-large district						
Congress	Seat A	Seat B	Seat C	Seat D	Seat E	Seat F	Seat G
3rd (1793–1795)	Thomas P. Carnes (AA)	Abraham Baldwin (AA)					
4th (1795–1797)	John Milledge (DR)	Abraham Baldwin (DR)					
5th (1797–1799)	John Milledge (DR)	Abraham Baldwin (DR)					
6th (1799–1801)	James Jones (F)	Benjamin Taliaferro (F)					
7th (1801–1803)	John Milledge (DR)	Benjamin Taliaferro (DR)					
7th (1801–1803)	Peter Early (DR)	David Meriwether (DR)					
8th (1803–1805)	Peter Early (DR)	David Meriwether (DR)	Joseph Bryan (DR)	Samuel Hammond (DR)			
9th (1805–1807)	Peter Early (DR)	David Meriwether (DR)	Joseph Bryan (DR)	Cowles Mead (DR)			
9th (1805–1807)	Peter Early (DR)	David Meriwether (DR)	Dennis Smelt (DR)	Thomas Spalding (DR)			
9th (1805–1807)	Peter Early (DR)	David Meriwether (DR)	Dennis Smelt (DR)	William W. Bibb (DR)			
10th (1807–1809)	Howell Cobb (DR)	George Troup (DR)	Dennis Smelt (DR)	William W. Bibb (DR)			
11th (1809–1811)	Howell Cobb (DR)	George Troup (DR)	Dennis Smelt (DR)	William W. Bibb (DR)			
12th (1811–1813)	Howell Cobb (DR)	George Troup (DR)	Bolling Hall (DR)	William W. Bibb (DR)			
12th (1811–1813)	William Barnett (DR)	George Troup (DR)	Bolling Hall (DR)	William W. Bibb (DR)			
13th (1813–1815)	William Barnett (DR)	George Troup (DR)	Bolling Hall (DR)	William W. Bibb (DR)	John Forsyth (DR)	Thomas Telfair (DR)	
13th (1813–1815)	William Barnett (DR)	George Troup (DR)	Bolling Hall (DR)	Alfred Cuthbert (DR)	John Forsyth (DR)	Thomas Telfair (DR)	
14th (1815–1817)	Richard H. Wilde (DR)	Wilson Lumpkin (DR)	Bolling Hall (DR)	Alfred Cuthbert (DR)	John Forsyth (DR)	Thomas Telfair (DR)	
14th (1815–1817)	Richard H. Wilde (DR)	Wilson Lumpkin (DR)	Bolling Hall (DR)	Zadock Cook (DR)	John Forsyth (DR)	Thomas Telfair (DR)	
15th (1817–1819)	Joel Abbot (DR) (Note: Supported the Crawford faction in the 1824 United States presidential election.)	Thomas W. Cobb (DR)	Joel Crawford (DR)	Zadock Cook (DR)	John Forsyth (DR)	William Terrell (DR)	
15th (1817–1819)	Joel Abbot (DR)	Thomas W. Cobb (DR)	Joel Crawford (DR)	Zadock Cook (DR)	Robert R. Reid (DR)	William Terrell (DR)	
16th (1819–1821)	Joel Abbot (DR)	Thomas W. Cobb (DR)	Joel Crawford (DR)	John A. Cuthbert (DR)	Robert R. Reid (DR)	William Terrell (DR)	
17th (1821–1823)	Joel Abbot (DR)	Alfred Cuthbert (DR)	George R. Gilmer (DR)	Edward F. Tattnall (DR)	Robert R. Reid (DR)	Wiley; Thompson (DR)	
18th (1823–1825)	Joel Abbot (DR)	Alfred Cuthbert (DR)	George Cary (DR)	Edward F. Tattnall (DR)	John Forsyth (DR)	Wiley; Thompson (DR)	Thomas W. Cobb (DR)
18th (1823–1825)	Joel Abbot (DR)	Alfred Cuthbert (DR)	George Cary (DR)	Edward F. Tattnall (DR)	John Forsyth (DR)	Wiley; Thompson (DR)	Richard H. Wilde (DR)
19th (1825–1827)	Charles E. Haynes (J)	Alfred Cuthbert (J)	George Cary (J)	Edward F. Tattnall (J)	John Forsyth (J)	Wiley; Thompson (J)	James Meriwether (J)

=== 1827–1829: 7 districts ===
In 1827, Georgia's seven seats were redistricted into seven districts.

Congress	District						
Congress	1st	2nd	3rd	4th	5th	6th	7th
20th (1827–1829)	Charles E. Haynes (J)	John Floyd (J)	Tomlinson Fort (J)	Edward F. Tattnall (J)	John Forsyth (J)	Wiley Thompson (J)	Wilson Lumpkin (J)
20th (1827–1829)	Charles E. Haynes (J)	John Floyd (J)	Tomlinson Fort (J)	George R. Gilmer (J)	Richard H. Wilde (J)	Wiley Thompson (J)	Wilson Lumpkin (J)

=== 1829–1845: at-large seats ===
In 1829, Georgia eliminated the districts and all seats were elected at-large statewide on a general ticket. Following 1830 census, Georgia was apportioned nine seats and following the 1840 census eight seats.

Congress	Elected on a general ticket from Georgia's at-large district								
Congress	Seat A	Seat B	Seat C	Seat D	Seat E	Seat F	Seat G	Seat H	Seat I
21st (1829–1831)	Charles E. Haynes (J)	Thomas F. Foster (J)	Henry G. Lamar (J)	James M. Wayne (J)	Richard H. Wilde (J)	Wiley Thompson (J)	Wilson Lumpkin (J)		
22nd (1831–1833)	Daniel Newnan (J)	Thomas F. Foster (J)	Henry G. Lamar (J)	James M. Wayne (J)	Richard H. Wilde (J)	Wiley Thompson (J)	Wilson Lumpkin (J)		
22nd (1831–1833)	Daniel Newnan (J)	Thomas F. Foster (J)	Henry G. Lamar (J)	James M. Wayne (J)	Richard H. Wilde (J)	Wiley Thompson (J)	Augustin S. Clayton (J)		
23rd (1833–1835)	John E. Coffee (J)	Thomas F. Foster (J)	William Schley (J)	James M. Wayne (J)	Richard H. Wilde (J)	Roger Lawson; Gamble (J)	Augustin S. Clayton (J)	George R. Gilmer (J)	Seaborn Jones (J)
24th (1835–1837)	John E. Coffee (J)	George W. Owens (J)	William Schley (J)	James M. Wayne (J)	John W. A. Sanford (J)	James C. Terrell (J)	George W. Towns (J)	Seaton Grantland (J)	Charles E. Haynes (J)
24th (1835–1837)	William C. Dawson (NR)	George W. Owens (J)	Jesse Franklin Cleveland (J)	Jabez Young Jackson (J)	Thomas Glascock (J)	Hopkins Holsey (J)	Julius C. Alford (NR)	Seaton Grantland (J)	Charles E. Haynes (J)
25th (1837–1839)	William C. Dawson (W)	George W. Owens (D)	Jesse Franklin Cleveland (D)	Jabez Young Jackson (D)	Thomas Glascock (D)	Hopkins Holsey (D)	George W. Towns (D)	Seaton Grantland (D)	Charles E. Haynes (D)
26th (1839–1841)	William C. Dawson (W)	Edward J. Black (W)	Julius C. Alford (W)	Walter T. Colquitt (W)	Mark A. Cooper (W)	Richard W. Habersham (W)	T. Butler King (W)	E. A. Nisbet (W)	Lott Warren (W)
26th (1839–1841)	William C. Dawson (W)	Edward J. Black (W)	Julius C. Alford (W)	Hines Holt (W)	Mark A. Cooper (W)	Richard W. Habersham (W)	T. Butler King (W)	E. A. Nisbet (W)	Lott Warren (W)
27th (1841–1843)	William C. Dawson (W)	Thomas F. Foster (W)	Julius C. Alford (W)	Roger Lawson Gamble (W)	James Archibald; Meriwether (W)	Richard W. Habersham (W)	T. Butler King (W)	E. A. Nisbet (W)	Lott Warren (W)
27th (1841–1843)	Mark A. Cooper (D)	Thomas F. Foster (W)	Edward J. Black (D)	Roger Lawson Gamble (W)	James Archibald; Meriwether (W)	George W. Crawford (W)	T. Butler King (W)	Walter T. Colquitt (D)	Lott Warren (W)
28th (1843–1845)	Mark A. Cooper (D)	William H. Stiles (D)	Edward J. Black (D)	John Millen (D)	Howell Cobb (D)	Hugh A. Haralson (D)	John B. Lamar (D)	John Henry; Lumpkin (D)	
28th (1843–1845)	Alexander H. Stephens (W)	William H. Stiles (D)	Edward J. Black (D)	Duncan Lamont Clinch (W)	Howell Cobb (D)	Hugh A. Haralson (D)	Absalom H. Chappell (W)	John Henry; Lumpkin (D)	

=== 1845–1863: 8 districts ===
In 1845, Georgia's eight seats were redistricted into eight districts.

Congress	District							
Congress	1st	2nd	3rd	4th	5th	6th	7th	8th
29th (1845–1847)	T. Butler; King (W)	Seaborn Jones (D)	George W. Towns (D)	Hugh A. Haralson (D)	John H. Lumpkin (D)	Howell Cobb (D)	Alexander H. Stephens (W)	Robert Toombs (W)
30th (1847–1849)	T. Butler; King (W)	Alfred Iverson Sr. (D)	John W. Jones (W)	Hugh A. Haralson (D)	John H. Lumpkin (D)	Howell Cobb (D)	Alexander H. Stephens (W)	Robert Toombs (W)
31st (1849–1851)	T. Butler; King (W)	Marshall J. Wellborn (D)	Allen F. Owen (W)	Hugh A. Haralson (D)	Thomas C. Hackett (D)	Howell Cobb (D)	Alexander H. Stephens (W)	Robert Toombs (W)
31st (1849–1851)	Joseph W. Jackson (D)	Marshall J. Wellborn (D)	Allen F. Owen (W)	Hugh A. Haralson (D)	Thomas C. Hackett (D)	Howell Cobb (D)	Alexander H. Stephens (W)	Robert Toombs (W)
32nd (1851–1853)	Joseph W. Jackson (D)	James Johnson (U)	Jack Bailey (D)	Charles Murphey (U)	Elijah W. Chastain (D)	Junius Hillyer (D)	Alexander H. Stephens (W)	Robert Toombs (W)
33rd (1853–1855)	James L. Seward (D)	Alfred H. Colquitt (D)	Jack Bailey (D)	William B. W. Dent (D)	Elijah W. Chastain (D)	Junius Hillyer (D)	David A. Reese (W)	Alexander H. Stephens (W)
34th (1855–1857)	James L. Seward (D)	Martin J. Crawford (D)	Robert P. Trippe (KN)	Hiram B. Warner (D)	John H. Lumpkin (D)	Howell Cobb (D)	Nathaniel G. Foster (KN)	Alexander H. Stephens (W)
35th (1857–1859)	James L. Seward (D)	Martin J. Crawford (D)	Robert P. Trippe (KN)	Lucius J. Gartrell (D)	Augustus R. Wright (D)	James Jackson (D)	Joshua Hill (KN)	Alexander H. Stephens (W)
36th (1859–1861)	Peter E. Love (D)	Martin J. Crawford (D)	Thomas; Hardeman Jr. (O)	Lucius J. Gartrell (D)	John W. H. Underwood (D)	James Jackson (D)	Joshua Hill (KN)	John J. Jones (D)
37th (1861–1863)	American Civil War							

=== 1863–1873: 7 districts ===
Following 1860 census, Georgia was apportioned seven seats.

Congress	District						
Congress	1st	2nd	3rd	4th	5th	6th	7th
38–39th (1863–1867)	American Civil War						
40th (1867–1869)	American Civil War						
40th (1867–1869)	Joseph W. Clift (R)	Nelson Tift (D)	William P. Edwards (R)	Samuel F. Gove (R)	Charles H. Prince (R)	vacant	Pierce M. B. Young (D)
41st (1869–1871)	vacant	vacant	vacant	vacant	vacant	vacant	vacant
41st (1869–1871)	William W. Paine (D)	Richard H. Whiteley (R)	Marion Bethune (R)	Jefferson F. Long (R)	Stephen A. Corker (D)	William P. Price (D)	Pierce M. B. Young (D)
42nd (1871–1873)	Archibald T. MacIntyre (D)	Richard H. Whiteley (R)	John S. Bigby (R)	Thomas J. Speer (R)	Dudley M. DuBose (D)	William P. Price (D)	Pierce M. B. Young (D)
42nd (1871–1873)	Archibald T. MacIntyre (D)	Richard H. Whiteley (R)	John S. Bigby (R)	Erasmus W. Beck (D)	Dudley M. DuBose (D)	William P. Price (D)	Pierce M. B. Young (D)

=== 1873–1883: 9 districts ===
Following 1870 census, Georgia was apportioned nine seats.

Congress	District								
Congress	1st	2nd	3rd	4th	5th	6th	7th	8th	9th
43rd (1873–1875)	Morgan Rawls (D)	Richard H. Whiteley (R)	Philip Cook (D)	Henry R. Harris (D)	James C. Freeman (R)	James Henderson; Blount (D)	Pierce M. B. Young (D)	Alexander H. Stephens (D)	Hiram Parks; Bell (D)
43rd (1873–1875)	Andrew Sloan (R)	Richard H. Whiteley (R)	Philip Cook (D)	Henry R. Harris (D)	James C. Freeman (R)	James Henderson; Blount (D)	Pierce M. B. Young (D)	Alexander H. Stephens (D)	Hiram Parks; Bell (D)
44th (1875–1877)	Julian Hartridge (D)	William Ephraim; Smith (D)	Philip Cook (D)	Henry R. Harris (D)	Milton A. Candler (D)	James Henderson; Blount (D)	William Harrell; Felton (ID)	Alexander H. Stephens (D)	Benjamin Harvey; Hill (D)
45th (1877–1879)	Julian Hartridge (D)	William Ephraim; Smith (D)	Philip Cook (D)	Henry R. Harris (D)	Milton A. Candler (D)	James Henderson; Blount (D)	William Harrell; Felton (ID)	Alexander H. Stephens (D)	Hiram Parks Bell (D)
45th (1877–1879)	William B. Fleming (D)	William Ephraim; Smith (D)	Philip Cook (D)	Henry R. Harris (D)	Milton A. Candler (D)	James Henderson; Blount (D)	William Harrell; Felton (ID)	Alexander H. Stephens (D)	Hiram Parks Bell (D)
46th (1879–1881)	John C. Nicholls (D)	William Ephraim; Smith (D)	Philip Cook (D)	Henry Persons (ID)	Nathaniel J. Hammond (D)	James Henderson; Blount (D)	William Harrell; Felton (ID)	Alexander H. Stephens (D)	Emory Speer (ID)
47th (1881–1883)	George Robison; Black (D)	Henry G. Turner (D)	Philip Cook (D)	Hugh Buchanan (D)	Nathaniel J. Hammond (D)	James Henderson; Blount (D)	Judson C. Clements (D)	Alexander H. Stephens (D)	Emory Speer (ID)
47th (1881–1883)	George Robison; Black (D)	Henry G. Turner (D)	Philip Cook (D)	Hugh Buchanan (D)	Nathaniel J. Hammond (D)	James Henderson; Blount (D)	Judson C. Clements (D)	Seaborn Reese (D)	Emory Speer (ID)

=== 1883–1893: 10 districts ===
Following 1880 census, Georgia was apportioned 10 seats. The tenth seat was elected at-large statewide in 1883. From 1885, all 10 seats were redistricted.

Congress	District									
Congress	1st	2nd	3rd	4th	5th	6th	7th	8th	9th	At-large
48th (1883–1885)	John C. Nicholls (D)	Henry G. Turner (D)	Charles F. Crisp (D)	Hugh Buchanan (D)	Nathaniel J. Hammond (D)	James; Henderson; Blount (D)	Judson C. Clements (D)	Seaborn Reese (D)	Allen D. Candler (D)	Thomas Hardeman (D)
49th (1885–1887)	Thomas M. Norwood (D)	Henry G. Turner (D)	Charles F. Crisp (D)	Henry R. Harris (D)	Nathaniel J. Hammond (D)	James; Henderson; Blount (D)	Judson C. Clements (D)	Seaborn Reese (D)	Allen D. Candler (D)	10th
49th (1885–1887)	Thomas M. Norwood (D)	Henry G. Turner (D)	Charles F. Crisp (D)	Henry R. Harris (D)	Nathaniel J. Hammond (D)	James; Henderson; Blount (D)	Judson C. Clements (D)	Seaborn Reese (D)	Allen D. Candler (D)	George Barnes (D)
50th (1887–1889)	Thomas M. Norwood (D)	Henry G. Turner (D)	Charles F. Crisp (D)	Thomas W. Grimes (D)	John D. Stewart (D)	James; Henderson; Blount (D)	Judson C. Clements (D)	Henry H. Carlton (D)	Allen D. Candler (D)	George Barnes (D)
51st (1889–1891)	Rufus E. Lester (D)	Henry G. Turner (D)	Charles F. Crisp (D)	Thomas W. Grimes (D)	John D. Stewart (D)	James; Henderson; Blount (D)	Judson C. Clements (D)	Henry H. Carlton (D)	Allen D. Candler (D)	George Barnes (D)
52nd (1891–1893)	Rufus E. Lester (D)	Henry G. Turner (D)	Charles F. Crisp (D)	Charles L. Moses (D)	Leonidas Livingston (D)	James; Henderson; Blount (D)	Robert W. Everett (D)	Thomas G. Lawson (D)	Thomas E. Winn (D)	Thomas E. Watson (Pop)

=== 1893–1913: 11 districts ===
Following 1890 census, Georgia was apportioned 11 seats.

Congress	District										
Congress	1st	2nd	3rd	4th	5th	6th	7th	8th	9th	10th	11th
53rd (1893–1895)	Rufus E. Lester (D)	Benjamin E. Russell (D)	Charles F. Crisp (D)	Charles L. Moses (D)	Leonidas; Livingston (D)	Thomas Banks; Cabaniss (D)	John W. Maddox (D)	Thomas G. Lawson (D)	Farish; Tate (D)	James C. C. Black (D)	Henry G. Turner (D)
54th (1895–1897)	Rufus E. Lester (D)	Benjamin E. Russell (D)	Charles F. Crisp (D)	Charles L. Moses (D)	Leonidas; Livingston (D)	Charles L. Bartlett (D)	John W. Maddox (D)	Thomas G. Lawson (D)	Farish; Tate (D)	James C. C. Black (D)	Henry G. Turner (D)
54th (1895–1897)	Rufus E. Lester (D)	Benjamin E. Russell (D)	Charles R. Crisp (D)	Charles L. Moses (D)	Leonidas; Livingston (D)	Charles L. Bartlett (D)	John W. Maddox (D)	Thomas G. Lawson (D)	Farish; Tate (D)	James C. C. Black (D)	Henry G. Turner (D)
55th (1897–1899)	Rufus E. Lester (D)	James M. Griggs (D)	Elijah B. Lewis (D)	William C. Adamson (D)	Leonidas; Livingston (D)	Charles L. Bartlett (D)	John W. Maddox (D)	William M. Howard (D)	Farish; Tate (D)	William H. Fleming (D)	William G. Brantley (D)
56th (1899–1901)	Rufus E. Lester (D)	James M. Griggs (D)	Elijah B. Lewis (D)	William C. Adamson (D)	Leonidas; Livingston (D)	Charles L. Bartlett (D)	John W. Maddox (D)	William M. Howard (D)	Farish; Tate (D)	William H. Fleming (D)	William G. Brantley (D)
57th (1901–1903)	Rufus E. Lester (D)	James M. Griggs (D)	Elijah B. Lewis (D)	William C. Adamson (D)	Leonidas; Livingston (D)	Charles L. Bartlett (D)	John W. Maddox (D)	William M. Howard (D)	Farish; Tate (D)	William H. Fleming (D)	William G. Brantley (D)
58th (1903–1905)	Rufus E. Lester (D)	James M. Griggs (D)	Elijah B. Lewis (D)	William C. Adamson (D)	Leonidas; Livingston (D)	Charles L. Bartlett (D)	John W. Maddox (D)	William M. Howard (D)	Farish; Tate (D)	Thomas W. Hardwick (D)	William G. Brantley (D)
59th (1905–1907)	Rufus E. Lester (D)	James M. Griggs (D)	Elijah B. Lewis (D)	William C. Adamson (D)	Leonidas; Livingston (D)	Charles L. Bartlett (D)	Gordon; Lee (D)	William M. Howard (D)	Thomas M. Bell (D)	Thomas W. Hardwick (D)	William G. Brantley (D)
59th (1905–1907)	J. W. Overstreet (D)	James M. Griggs (D)	Elijah B. Lewis (D)	William C. Adamson (D)	Leonidas; Livingston (D)	Charles L. Bartlett (D)	Gordon; Lee (D)	William M. Howard (D)	Thomas M. Bell (D)	Thomas W. Hardwick (D)	William G. Brantley (D)
60th (1907–1909)	Charles G. Edwards (D)	James M. Griggs (D)	Elijah B. Lewis (D)	William C. Adamson (D)	Leonidas; Livingston (D)	Charles L. Bartlett (D)	Gordon; Lee (D)	William M. Howard (D)	Thomas M. Bell (D)	Thomas W. Hardwick (D)	William G. Brantley (D)
61st (1909–1911)	Charles G. Edwards (D)	James M. Griggs (D)	Dudley M. Hughes (D)	William C. Adamson (D)	Leonidas; Livingston (D)	Charles L. Bartlett (D)	Gordon; Lee (D)	William M. Howard (D)	Thomas M. Bell (D)	Thomas W. Hardwick (D)	William G. Brantley (D)
61st (1909–1911)	Charles G. Edwards (D)	Seaborn; Roddenbery (D)	Dudley M. Hughes (D)	William C. Adamson (D)	Leonidas; Livingston (D)	Charles L. Bartlett (D)	Gordon; Lee (D)	William M. Howard (D)	Thomas M. Bell (D)	Thomas W. Hardwick (D)	William G. Brantley (D)
62nd (1911–1913)	Charles G. Edwards (D)	Seaborn; Roddenbery (D)	Dudley M. Hughes (D)	William C. Adamson (D)	William S. Howard (D)	Charles L. Bartlett (D)	Gordon; Lee (D)	Samuel J. Tribble (D)	Thomas M. Bell (D)	Thomas W. Hardwick (D)	William G. Brantley (D)

=== 1913–1933: 12 districts ===
Following 1910 census, Georgia was apportioned 12 seats.

Congress	District											
Congress	1st	2nd	3rd	4th	5th	6th	7th	8th	9th	10th	11th	12th
63rd (1913–1915)	Charles G. Edwards (D)	Seaborn; Roddenbery (D)	Charles R. Crisp (D)	William C. Adamson (D)	William S. Howard (D)	Charles L. Bartlett (D)	Gordon; Lee (D)	Samuel J. Tribble (D)	Thomas M. Bell (D)	Thomas W. Hardwick (D)	John R. Walker (D)	Dudley M. Hughes (D)
63rd (1913–1915)	Charles G. Edwards (D)	Frank Park (D)	Charles R. Crisp (D)	William C. Adamson (D)	William S. Howard (D)	Charles L. Bartlett (D)	Gordon; Lee (D)	Samuel J. Tribble (D)	Thomas M. Bell (D)	Carl; Vinson (D)	John R. Walker (D)	Dudley M. Hughes (D)
64th (1915–1917)	Charles G. Edwards (D)	Frank Park (D)	Charles R. Crisp (D)	William C. Adamson (D)	William S. Howard (D)	James W. Wise (D)	Gordon; Lee (D)	Samuel J. Tribble (D)	Thomas M. Bell (D)	Carl; Vinson (D)	John R. Walker (D)	Dudley M. Hughes (D)
64th (1915–1917)	Charles G. Edwards (D)	Frank Park (D)	Charles R. Crisp (D)	William C. Adamson (D)	William S. Howard (D)	James W. Wise (D)	Gordon; Lee (D)	Tinsley W. Rucker Jr. (D)	Thomas M. Bell (D)	Carl; Vinson (D)	John R. Walker (D)	Dudley M. Hughes (D)
65th (1917–1919)	James W. Overstreet (D)	Frank Park (D)	Charles R. Crisp (D)	William C. Adamson (D)	William S. Howard (D)	James W. Wise (D)	Gordon; Lee (D)	Charles H. Brand (D)	Thomas M. Bell (D)	Carl; Vinson (D)	John R. Walker (D)	William; Washington; Larsen (D)
65th (1917–1919)	James W. Overstreet (D)	Frank Park (D)	Charles R. Crisp (D)	William C. Wright (D)	William S. Howard (D)	James W. Wise (D)	Gordon; Lee (D)	Charles H. Brand (D)	Thomas M. Bell (D)	Carl; Vinson (D)	John R. Walker (D)	William; Washington; Larsen (D)
66th (1919–1921)	James W. Overstreet (D)	Frank Park (D)	Charles R. Crisp (D)	William C. Wright (D)	William D. Upshaw (D)	James W. Wise (D)	Gordon; Lee (D)	Charles H. Brand (D)	Thomas M. Bell (D)	Carl; Vinson (D)	William C. Lankford (D)	William; Washington; Larsen (D)
67th (1921–1923)	James W. Overstreet (D)	Frank Park (D)	Charles R. Crisp (D)	William C. Wright (D)	William D. Upshaw (D)	James W. Wise (D)	Gordon; Lee (D)	Charles H. Brand (D)	Thomas M. Bell (D)	Carl; Vinson (D)	William C. Lankford (D)	William; Washington; Larsen (D)
68th (1923–1925)	R. Lee Moore (D)	Frank Park (D)	Charles R. Crisp (D)	William C. Wright (D)	William D. Upshaw (D)	James W. Wise (D)	Gordon; Lee (D)	Charles H. Brand (D)	Thomas M. Bell (D)	Carl; Vinson (D)	William C. Lankford (D)	William; Washington; Larsen (D)
69th (1925–1927)	Charles G. Edwards (D)	E. Eugene; Cox (D)	Charles R. Crisp (D)	William C. Wright (D)	William D. Upshaw (D)	Samuel; Rutherford (D)	Gordon; Lee (D)	Charles H. Brand (D)	Thomas M. Bell (D)	Carl; Vinson (D)	William C. Lankford (D)	William; Washington; Larsen (D)
70th (1927–1929)	Charles G. Edwards (D)	E. Eugene; Cox (D)	Charles R. Crisp (D)	William C. Wright (D)	Leslie J. Steele (D)	Samuel; Rutherford (D)	Malcolm C. Tarver (D)	Charles H. Brand (D)	Thomas M. Bell (D)	Carl; Vinson (D)	William C. Lankford (D)	William; Washington; Larsen (D)
71st (1929–1931)	Charles G. Edwards (D)	E. Eugene; Cox (D)	Charles R. Crisp (D)	William C. Wright (D)	Leslie J. Steele (D)	Samuel; Rutherford (D)	Malcolm C. Tarver (D)	Charles H. Brand (D)	Thomas M. Bell (D)	Carl; Vinson (D)	William C. Lankford (D)	William; Washington; Larsen (D)
71st (1929–1931)	Charles G. Edwards (D)	E. Eugene; Cox (D)	Charles R. Crisp (D)	William C. Wright (D)	Robert; Ramspeck (D)	Samuel; Rutherford (D)	Malcolm C. Tarver (D)	Charles H. Brand (D)	Thomas M. Bell (D)	Carl; Vinson (D)	William C. Lankford (D)	William; Washington; Larsen (D)
72nd (1931–1933)	Charles G. Edwards (D)	E. Eugene; Cox (D)	Charles R. Crisp (D)	William C. Wright (D)	Robert; Ramspeck (D)	Samuel; Rutherford (D)	Malcolm C. Tarver (D)	Charles H. Brand (D)	John Stephens; Wood (D)	Carl; Vinson (D)	William C. Lankford (D)	William; Washington; Larsen (D)
72nd (1931–1933)	Homer C. Parker (D)	E. Eugene; Cox (D)	Bryant T. Castellow (D)	William C. Wright (D)	Robert; Ramspeck (D)	Carlton Mobley (D)	Malcolm C. Tarver (D)	Charles H. Brand (D)	John Stephens; Wood (D)	Carl; Vinson (D)	William C. Lankford (D)	William; Washington; Larsen (D)

=== 1933–1993: 10 districts ===
Following 1930 census, Georgia was apportioned 10 seats.

Congress	District									
Congress	1st	2nd	3rd	4th	5th	6th	7th	8th	9th	10th
73rd (1933–1935)	Homer C. Parker (D)	E. Eugene; Cox (D)	Bryant T. Castellow (D)	Emmett M. Owen (D)	Robert; Ramspeck (D)	Carl; Vinson (D)	Malcolm C. Tarver (D)	Braswell Deen (D)	John Stephens; Wood (D)	Charles H. Brand (D)
73rd (1933–1935)	Homer C. Parker (D)	E. Eugene; Cox (D)	Bryant T. Castellow (D)	Emmett M. Owen (D)	Robert; Ramspeck (D)	Carl; Vinson (D)	Malcolm C. Tarver (D)	Braswell Deen (D)	John Stephens; Wood (D)	Paul Brown (D)
74th (1935–1937)	Hugh; Peterson (D)	E. Eugene; Cox (D)	Bryant T. Castellow (D)	Emmett M. Owen (D)	Robert; Ramspeck (D)	Carl; Vinson (D)	Malcolm C. Tarver (D)	Braswell Deen (D)	B. Frank; Whelchel (D)	Paul Brown (D)
75th (1937–1939)	Hugh; Peterson (D)	E. Eugene; Cox (D)	Stephen Pace (D)	Emmett M. Owen (D)	Robert; Ramspeck (D)	Carl; Vinson (D)	Malcolm C. Tarver (D)	Braswell Deen (D)	B. Frank; Whelchel (D)	Paul Brown (D)
76th (1939–1941)	Hugh; Peterson (D)	E. Eugene; Cox (D)	Stephen Pace (D)	Emmett M. Owen (D)	Robert; Ramspeck (D)	Carl; Vinson (D)	Malcolm C. Tarver (D)	W. Benjamin Gibbs (D)	B. Frank; Whelchel (D)	Paul Brown (D)
76th (1939–1941)	Hugh; Peterson (D)	E. Eugene; Cox (D)	Stephen Pace (D)	A. Sidney; Camp (D)	Robert; Ramspeck (D)	Carl; Vinson (D)	Malcolm C. Tarver (D)	Florence Gibbs (D)	B. Frank; Whelchel (D)	Paul Brown (D)
77th (1941–1943)	Hugh; Peterson (D)	E. Eugene; Cox (D)	Stephen Pace (D)	A. Sidney; Camp (D)	Robert; Ramspeck (D)	Carl; Vinson (D)	Malcolm C. Tarver (D)	John S. Gibson (D)	B. Frank; Whelchel (D)	Paul Brown (D)
78th (1943–1945)	Hugh; Peterson (D)	E. Eugene; Cox (D)	Stephen Pace (D)	A. Sidney; Camp (D)	Robert; Ramspeck (D)	Carl; Vinson (D)	Malcolm C. Tarver (D)	John S. Gibson (D)	B. Frank; Whelchel (D)	Paul Brown (D)
79th (1945–1947)	Hugh; Peterson (D)	E. Eugene; Cox (D)	Stephen Pace (D)	A. Sidney; Camp (D)	Robert; Ramspeck (D)	Carl; Vinson (D)	Malcolm C. Tarver (D)	John S. Gibson (D)	John Stephens; Wood (D)	Paul Brown (D)
79th (1945–1947)	Hugh; Peterson (D)	E. Eugene; Cox (D)	Stephen Pace (D)	A. Sidney; Camp (D)	Helen D. Mankin (D)	Carl; Vinson (D)	Malcolm C. Tarver (D)	John S. Gibson (D)	John Stephens; Wood (D)	Paul Brown (D)
80th (1947–1949)	Prince; Preston (D)	E. Eugene; Cox (D)	Stephen Pace (D)	A. Sidney; Camp (D)	James C. Davis (D)	Carl; Vinson (D)	Henderson L. Lanham (D)	Don Wheeler (D)	John Stephens; Wood (D)	Paul Brown (D)
81st (1949–1951)	Prince; Preston (D)	E. Eugene; Cox (D)	Stephen Pace (D)	A. Sidney; Camp (D)	James C. Davis (D)	Carl; Vinson (D)	Henderson L. Lanham (D)	Don Wheeler (D)	John Stephens; Wood (D)	Paul Brown (D)
82nd (1951–1953)	Prince; Preston (D)	E. Eugene; Cox (D)	Tic Forrester (D)	A. Sidney; Camp (D)	James C. Davis (D)	Carl; Vinson (D)	Henderson L. Lanham (D)	Don Wheeler (D)	John Stephens; Wood (D)	Paul Brown (D)
83rd (1953–1955)	Prince; Preston (D)	J. L. Pilcher (D)	Tic Forrester (D)	A. Sidney; Camp (D)	James C. Davis (D)	Carl; Vinson (D)	Henderson L. Lanham (D)	Don Wheeler (D)	Phil; Landrum (D)	Paul Brown (D)
83rd (1953–1955)	Prince; Preston (D)	J. L. Pilcher (D)	Tic Forrester (D)	John Flynt (D)	James C. Davis (D)	Carl; Vinson (D)	Henderson L. Lanham (D)	Don Wheeler (D)	Phil; Landrum (D)	Paul Brown (D)
84th (1955–1957)	Prince; Preston (D)	J. L. Pilcher (D)	Tic Forrester (D)	John Flynt (D)	James C. Davis (D)	Carl; Vinson (D)	Henderson L. Lanham (D)	Iris Faircloth; Blitch (D)	Phil; Landrum (D)	Paul Brown (D)
85th (1957–1959)	Prince; Preston (D)	J. L. Pilcher (D)	Tic Forrester (D)	John Flynt (D)	James C. Davis (D)	Carl; Vinson (D)	Henderson L. Lanham (D)	Iris Faircloth; Blitch (D)	Phil; Landrum (D)	Paul Brown (D)
85th (1957–1959)	Prince; Preston (D)	J. L. Pilcher (D)	Tic Forrester (D)	John Flynt (D)	James C. Davis (D)	Carl; Vinson (D)	Harlan; Mitchell (D)	Iris Faircloth; Blitch (D)	Phil; Landrum (D)	Paul Brown (D)
86th (1959–1961)	Prince; Preston (D)	J. L. Pilcher (D)	Tic Forrester (D)	John Flynt (D)	James C. Davis (D)	Carl; Vinson (D)	Harlan; Mitchell (D)	Iris Faircloth; Blitch (D)	Phil; Landrum (D)	Paul Brown (D)
87th (1961–1963)	G. Elliott; Hagan (D)	J. L. Pilcher (D)	Tic Forrester (D)	John Flynt (D)	James C. Davis (D)	Carl; Vinson (D)	John William; Davis (D)	Iris Faircloth; Blitch (D)	Phil; Landrum (D)	Robert G. Stephens; Jr. (D)
88th (1963–1965)	G. Elliott; Hagan (D)	J. L. Pilcher (D)	Tic Forrester (D)	John Flynt (D)	Charles L. Weltner (D)	Carl; Vinson (D)	John William; Davis (D)	J. Russell Tuten (D)	Phil; Landrum (D)	Robert G. Stephens; Jr. (D)
89th (1965–1967)	G. Elliott; Hagan (D)	Maston E. O'Neal Jr. (D)	Bo Callaway (R)	James Mackay (D)	Charles L. Weltner (D)	John Flynt (D)	John William; Davis (D)	J. Russell Tuten (D)	Phil; Landrum (D)	Robert G. Stephens; Jr. (D)
90th (1967–1969)	G. Elliott; Hagan (D)	Maston E. O'Neal Jr. (D)	Jack Brinkley (D)	Benjamin B. Blackburn (R)	Fletcher; Thompson (R)	John Flynt (D)	John William; Davis (D)	W. S. Stuckey Jr. (D)	Phil; Landrum (D)	Robert G. Stephens; Jr. (D)
91st (1969–1971)	G. Elliott; Hagan (D)	Maston E. O'Neal Jr. (D)	Jack Brinkley (D)	Benjamin B. Blackburn (R)	Fletcher; Thompson (R)	John Flynt (D)	John William; Davis (D)	W. S. Stuckey Jr. (D)	Phil; Landrum (D)	Robert G. Stephens; Jr. (D)
92nd (1971–1973)	G. Elliott; Hagan (D)	Dawson; Mathis (D)	Jack Brinkley (D)	Benjamin B. Blackburn (R)	Fletcher; Thompson (R)	John Flynt (D)	John William; Davis (D)	W. S. Stuckey Jr. (D)	Phil; Landrum (D)	Robert G. Stephens; Jr. (D)
93rd (1973–1975)	Bo Ginn (D)	Dawson; Mathis (D)	Jack Brinkley (D)	Benjamin B. Blackburn (R)	Andrew Young (D)	John Flynt (D)	John William; Davis (D)	W. S. Stuckey Jr. (D)	Phil; Landrum (D)	Robert G. Stephens; Jr. (D)
94th (1975–1977)	Bo Ginn (D)	Dawson; Mathis (D)	Jack Brinkley (D)	Elliott H. Levitas (D)	Andrew Young (D)	John Flynt (D)	Larry; McDonald (D)	W. S. Stuckey Jr. (D)	Phil; Landrum (D)	Robert G. Stephens; Jr. (D)
95th (1977–1979)	Bo Ginn (D)	Dawson; Mathis (D)	Jack Brinkley (D)	Elliott H. Levitas (D)	Andrew Young (D)	John Flynt (D)	Larry; McDonald (D)	Billy Lee Evans (D)	Ed Jenkins (D)	Doug; Barnard Jr. (D)
95th (1977–1979)	Bo Ginn (D)	Dawson; Mathis (D)	Jack Brinkley (D)	Elliott H. Levitas (D)	Wyche Fowler (D)	John Flynt (D)	Larry; McDonald (D)	Billy Lee Evans (D)	Ed Jenkins (D)	Doug; Barnard Jr. (D)
96th (1979–1981)	Bo Ginn (D)	Dawson; Mathis (D)	Jack Brinkley (D)	Elliott H. Levitas (D)	Wyche Fowler (D)	Newt; Gingrich (R)	Larry; McDonald (D)	Billy Lee Evans (D)	Ed Jenkins (D)	Doug; Barnard Jr. (D)
97th (1981–1983)	Bo Ginn (D)	Charles; Hatcher (D)	Jack Brinkley (D)	Elliott H. Levitas (D)	Wyche Fowler (D)	Newt; Gingrich (R)	Larry; McDonald (D)	Billy Lee Evans (D)	Ed Jenkins (D)	Doug; Barnard Jr. (D)
98th (1983–1985)	Lindsay; Thomas (D)	Charles; Hatcher (D)	Richard Ray (D)	Elliott H. Levitas (D)	Wyche Fowler (D)	Newt; Gingrich (R)	Larry; McDonald (D)	J. Roy Rowland (D)	Ed Jenkins (D)	Doug; Barnard Jr. (D)
98th (1983–1985)	Lindsay; Thomas (D)	Charles; Hatcher (D)	Richard Ray (D)	Elliott H. Levitas (D)	Wyche Fowler (D)	Newt; Gingrich (R)	Buddy; Darden (D)	J. Roy Rowland (D)	Ed Jenkins (D)	Doug; Barnard Jr. (D)
99th (1985–1987)	Lindsay; Thomas (D)	Charles; Hatcher (D)	Richard Ray (D)	Pat Swindall (R)	Wyche Fowler (D)	Newt; Gingrich (R)	Buddy; Darden (D)	J. Roy Rowland (D)	Ed Jenkins (D)	Doug; Barnard Jr. (D)
100th (1987–1989)	Lindsay; Thomas (D)	Charles; Hatcher (D)	Richard Ray (D)	Pat Swindall (R)	John Lewis (D)	Newt; Gingrich (R)	Buddy; Darden (D)	J. Roy Rowland (D)	Ed Jenkins (D)	Doug; Barnard Jr. (D)
101st (1989–1991)	Lindsay; Thomas (D)	Charles; Hatcher (D)	Richard Ray (D)	Ben Jones (D)	John Lewis (D)	Newt; Gingrich (R)	Buddy; Darden (D)	J. Roy Rowland (D)	Ed Jenkins (D)	Doug; Barnard Jr. (D)
102nd (1991–1993)	Lindsay; Thomas (D)	Charles; Hatcher (D)	Richard Ray (D)	Ben Jones (D)	John Lewis (D)	Newt; Gingrich (R)	Buddy; Darden (D)	J. Roy Rowland (D)	Ed Jenkins (D)	Doug; Barnard Jr. (D)
Congress	1st	2nd	3rd	4th	5th	6th	7th	8th	9th	10th
Congress	District									

=== 1993–2003: 11 districts ===
Following 1990 census, Georgia was apportioned 11 seats.

Congress	District										
Congress	1st	2nd	3rd	4th	5th	6th	7th	8th	9th	10th	11th
103rd (1993–1995)	Jack; Kingston (R)	Sanford; Bishop (D)	Mac; Collins (R)	John; Linder (R)	John; Lewis (D)	Newt; Gingrich (R)	Buddy Darden (D)	J. Roy Rowland (D)	Nathan Deal (D)	Don Johnson (D)	Cynthia; McKinney (D)
104th (1995–1997)	Jack; Kingston (R)	Sanford; Bishop (D)	Mac; Collins (R)	John; Linder (R)	John; Lewis (D)	Newt; Gingrich (R)	Bob Barr (R)	Saxby; Chambliss (R)	Nathan Deal (R)	Charlie; Norwood (R)	Cynthia; McKinney (D)
105th (1997–1999)	Jack; Kingston (R)	Sanford; Bishop (D)	Mac; Collins (R)	Cynthia; McKinney (D)	John; Lewis (D)	Newt; Gingrich (R)	Bob Barr (R)	Saxby; Chambliss (R)	Nathan Deal (R)	Charlie; Norwood (R)	John; Linder (R)
106th (1999–2001)	Jack; Kingston (R)	Sanford; Bishop (D)	Mac; Collins (R)	Cynthia; McKinney (D)	John; Lewis (D)	vacant	Bob Barr (R)	Saxby; Chambliss (R)	Nathan Deal (R)	Charlie; Norwood (R)	John; Linder (R)
106th (1999–2001)	Jack; Kingston (R)	Sanford; Bishop (D)	Mac; Collins (R)	Cynthia; McKinney (D)	John; Lewis (D)	Johnny; Isakson (R)	Bob Barr (R)	Saxby; Chambliss (R)	Nathan Deal (R)	Charlie; Norwood (R)	John; Linder (R)
107th (2001–2003)	Jack; Kingston (R)	Sanford; Bishop (D)	Mac; Collins (R)	Cynthia; McKinney (D)	John; Lewis (D)	Johnny; Isakson (R)	Bob Barr (R)	Saxby; Chambliss (R)	Nathan Deal (R)	Charlie; Norwood (R)	John; Linder (R)

=== 2003–2013: 13 districts ===
Following 2000 census, Georgia was apportioned 13 seats.

Congress	District												
Congress	1st	2nd	3rd	4th	5th	6th	7th	8th	9th	10th	11th	12th	13th
108th (2003–2005)	Jack; Kingston (R)	Sanford; Bishop (D)	Jim; Marshall (D)	Denise Majette (D)	John; Lewis (D)	Johnny Isakson (R)	John; Linder (R)	Mac Collins (R)	Charlie; Norwood (R)	Nathan; Deal (R)	Phil; Gingrey (R)	Max Burns (R)	David; Scott (D)
109th (2005–2007)	Jack; Kingston (R)	Sanford; Bishop (D)	Jim; Marshall (D)	Cynthia McKinney (D)	John; Lewis (D)	Tom; Price (R)	John; Linder (R)	Lynn Westmoreland (R)	Charlie; Norwood (R)	Nathan; Deal (R)	Phil; Gingrey (R)	John; Barrow (D)	David; Scott (D)
110th (2007–2009)	Jack; Kingston (R)	Sanford; Bishop (D)	Lynn; Westmoreland (R)	Hank; Johnson (D)	John; Lewis (D)	Tom; Price (R)	John; Linder (R)	Jim; Marshall (D)	Nathan; Deal (R)	Charlie Norwood (R)	Phil; Gingrey (R)	John; Barrow (D)	David; Scott (D)
110th (2007–2009)	Jack; Kingston (R)	Sanford; Bishop (D)	Lynn; Westmoreland (R)	Hank; Johnson (D)	John; Lewis (D)	Tom; Price (R)	John; Linder (R)	Jim; Marshall (D)	Nathan; Deal (R)	Paul; Broun (R)	Phil; Gingrey (R)	John; Barrow (D)	David; Scott (D)
111th (2009–2011)	Jack; Kingston (R)	Sanford; Bishop (D)	Lynn; Westmoreland (R)	Hank; Johnson (D)	John; Lewis (D)	Tom; Price (R)	John; Linder (R)	Jim; Marshall (D)	Tom; Graves (R)	Paul; Broun (R)	Phil; Gingrey (R)	John; Barrow (D)	David; Scott (D)
112th (2011–2013)	Jack; Kingston (R)	Sanford; Bishop (D)	Lynn; Westmoreland (R)	Hank; Johnson (D)	John; Lewis (D)	Tom; Price (R)	Rob; Woodall (R)	Austin; Scott (R)	Tom; Graves (R)	Paul; Broun (R)	Phil; Gingrey (R)	John; Barrow (D)	David; Scott (D)

=== 2013–present: 14 districts ===
Following 2010 census, Georgia was apportioned 14 seats.

Congress	District													
Congress	1st	2nd	3rd	4th	5th	6th	7th	8th	9th	10th	11th	12th	13th	14th
113th (2013–2015)	Jack; Kingston (R)	Sanford; Bishop (D)	Lynn; Westmoreland (R)	Hank; Johnson (D)	John; Lewis (D)	Tom; Price (R)	Rob; Woodall (R)	Austin; Scott (R)	Doug; Collins (R)	Paul; Broun (R)	Phil; Gingrey (R)	John; Barrow (D)	David; Scott (D)	Tom; Graves (R)
114th (2015–2017)	Buddy; Carter (R)	Sanford; Bishop (D)	Lynn; Westmoreland (R)	Hank; Johnson (D)	John; Lewis (D)	Tom; Price (R)	Rob; Woodall (R)	Austin; Scott (R)	Doug; Collins (R)	Jody; Hice (R)	Barry; Loudermilk (R)	Rick; Allen (R)	David; Scott (D)	Tom; Graves (R)
115th (2017–2019)	Buddy; Carter (R)	Sanford; Bishop (D)	Drew; Ferguson (R)	Hank; Johnson (D)	John; Lewis (D)	Tom; Price (R)	Rob; Woodall (R)	Austin; Scott (R)	Doug; Collins (R)	Jody; Hice (R)	Barry; Loudermilk (R)	Rick; Allen (R)	David; Scott (D)	Tom; Graves (R)
115th (2017–2019)	Buddy; Carter (R)	Sanford; Bishop (D)	Drew; Ferguson (R)	Hank; Johnson (D)	John; Lewis (D)	Karen Handel (R)	Rob; Woodall (R)	Austin; Scott (R)	Doug; Collins (R)	Jody; Hice (R)	Barry; Loudermilk (R)	Rick; Allen (R)	David; Scott (D)	Tom; Graves (R)
116th (2019–2021)	Buddy; Carter (R)	Sanford; Bishop (D)	Drew; Ferguson (R)	Hank; Johnson (D)	John; Lewis (D)	Lucy; McBath (D)	Rob; Woodall (R)	Austin; Scott (R)	Doug; Collins (R)	Jody; Hice (R)	Barry; Loudermilk (R)	Rick; Allen (R)	David; Scott (D)	Tom; Graves (R)
116th (2019–2021)	Buddy; Carter (R)	Sanford; Bishop (D)	Drew; Ferguson (R)	Hank; Johnson (D)	Kwanza Hall (D)	Lucy; McBath (D)	Rob; Woodall (R)	Austin; Scott (R)	Doug; Collins (R)	Jody; Hice (R)	Barry; Loudermilk (R)	Rick; Allen (R)	David; Scott (D)	Tom; Graves (R)
117th (2021–2023)	Buddy; Carter (R)	Sanford; Bishop (D)	Drew; Ferguson (R)	Hank; Johnson (D)	Nikema; Williams (D)	Lucy; McBath (D)	Carolyn; Bourdeaux (D)	Austin; Scott (R)	Andrew; Clyde (R)	Jody; Hice (R)	Barry; Loudermilk (R)	Rick; Allen (R)	David; Scott (D)	Marjorie; Taylor; Greene (R)
118th (2023–2025)	Buddy; Carter (R)	Sanford; Bishop (D)	Drew; Ferguson (R)	Hank; Johnson (D)	Nikema; Williams (D)	Rich; McCormick (R)	Lucy; McBath (D)	Austin; Scott (R)	Andrew; Clyde (R)	Mike; Collins (R)	Barry; Loudermilk (R)	Rick; Allen (R)	David; Scott (D)	Marjorie; Taylor; Greene (R)
119th (2025–2027)	Buddy; Carter (R)	Sanford; Bishop (D)	Brian; Jack (R)	Hank; Johnson (D)	Nikema; Williams (D)	Lucy; McBath (D)	Rich; McCormick (R)	Austin; Scott (R)	Andrew; Clyde (R)	Mike; Collins (R)	Barry; Loudermilk (R)	Rick; Allen (R)	David; Scott (D)	Marjorie; Taylor; Greene (R)
119th (2025–2027)	Buddy; Carter (R)	Sanford; Bishop (D)	Brian; Jack (R)	Hank; Johnson (D)	Nikema; Williams (D)	Lucy; McBath (D)	Rich; McCormick (R)	Austin; Scott (R)	Andrew; Clyde (R)	Mike; Collins (R)	Barry; Loudermilk (R)	Rick; Allen (R)	Everton; Blair (D)	Clay; Fuller (R)
120th (2027–2029)	Jim; Kingston (R)	Sanford; Bishop (D)	Brian; Jack (R)	Hank; Johnson (D)	Nikema; Williams (D)	Lucy; McBath (D)	Rich; McCormick (R)	Austin; Scott (R)	Andrew; Clyde (R)	Houston; Gaines (R)	John; Cowan (R)	Rick; Allen (R)	Jasmine; Clark (D)	Clay; Fuller (R)

== Key ==
Anti-Administration (AA)
Democratic (D)
Democratic-Republican (DR)
Federalist (F)
Pro-Administration (PA)
Independent Democrat (ID)
Jacksonian (J)
Know Nothing (KN)
National Republican (NR)
Populist (Pop)
Republican (R)
Union (U)
Whig (W)

== See also ==
- List of United States congressional districts
- Georgia's congressional districts
- Political party strength in Georgia
