= Henry Persons =

American politician (1834–1910)

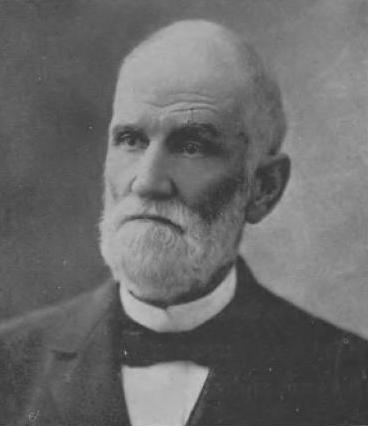

Member of the U.S. House of Representatives from Georgia's 4th district
- In office March 4, 1879 – March 3, 1881
- Preceded by: Henry R. Harris
- Succeeded by: Hugh Buchanan

Personal details
- Born: January 30, 1834 Smarrs, Georgia, U.S.
- Died: June 17, 1910 (aged 76) Talbotton, Georgia, U.S.
- Party: Democratic

Military service
- Commands: Third Georgia regiment of the Confederate States Army
- Battles/wars: American Civil War

Joseph "Henry" Persons (January 30, 1834 – June 17, 1910) was an American politician, lawyer and soldier.

== Early life ==
Persons was born near Smarrs, Georgia, in Monroe County; however, his family moved to Talbot County, Georgia in 1836. He attended the University of Georgia (UGA) in Athens and graduated with a Bachelor of Arts degree in 1855.

== Civil War ==
During the American Civil War, Persons served as a cavalry captain in the Third Georgia regiment of the Confederate States Army.

== Postbellum ==
After the war, he was elected as a Representative to the 46th United States Congress as an Independent Democrat. Persons lost his bid for re-election in 1880 and returned to Geneva, Georgia. He studied law, gained admittance to the state bar in 1885 and began practicing law in Talbotton, Georgia.

After his political service, Persons served as a UGA trustee from 1894 until 1910. He died that year in Talbotton and was buried in that city's Rose Hill Cemetery.

U.S. House of Representatives
Preceded by Henry R. Harris	U.S. Representative for Georgia's 4th congressional district March 4, 1879 – March 3, 1881	Succeeded by Hugh Buchanan
