= Thomas W. Grimes =

American politician

Thomas Wingfield Grimes
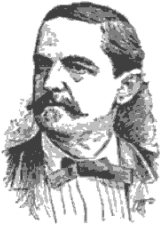

Member of the U.S. House of Representatives for Georgia
- In office March 4, 1887 – March 3, 1891
- Constituency: 4th District

Member of the Georgia Senate
- In office 1878–1879

Member of the Georgia House of Representatives
- In office 1868, 1869, 1875, 1876

Personal details
- Born: December 18, 1844 Columbus, Georgia, U.S.
- Died: October 28, 1905 (aged 60) Columbus, Georgia, U.S.
- Resting place: Linwood Cemetery
- Party: Democratic
- Occupation: Lawyer, politician

Thomas Wingfield Grimes (December 18, 1844 – October 28, 1905) was an American politician and lawyer.

== Biography ==
Grimes was born in Columbus, Georgia. After earning his Bachelor of Arts degree from the University of Georgia in Athens in 1863, Grimes studied law and became a practicing lawyer.

After serving in the Confederate Army during the Civil War, Grimes was elected to the Georgia House of Representatives in 1868, 1869, 1875, and 1876, the Georgia Senate in 1878 and 1879, and the U.S. House of Representatives in 1886 and 1888.

Grimes died in Columbus in 1905 and was buried in Linwood Cemetery.

U.S. House of Representatives
Preceded by Henry R. Harris	U.S. Representative of Georgia's 4th congressional district March 4, 1887 – March 3, 1891	Succeeded by Charles L. Moses
