= Benjamin B. Blackburn =

American politician (1927–2024)

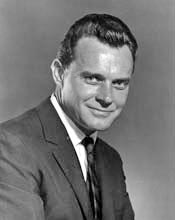
- Blackburn in 1950

Member of the U.S. House of Representatives from Georgia's 4th district
- In office January 3, 1967 – January 3, 1975
- Preceded by: James MacKay
- Succeeded by: Elliott H. Levitas

Personal details
- Born: Benjamin Bentley Blackburn; February 14, 1927 Atlanta, Georgia, U.S.
- Died: December 3, 2024 (aged 97) Jasper, Georgia, U.S.
- Party: Republican
- Spouse: Mary Antonia Pandora (m. 1952; died 2018)
- Children: 4
- Education: University of North Carolina (BA); Emory University (LLB)
- Occupation: Lawyer

Military service
- Branch/service: United States Navy; United States Naval Reserve
- Rank: Lieutenant commander
- Battles/wars: World War II; Korean War

Benjamin Bentley Blackburn III (February 14, 1927 – December 3, 2024) was an American politician from the U.S. state of Georgia who served as member of the United States House of Representatives for four terms representing Georgia's 4th congressional district from 1967 to 1975. After he left the U.S. House of Representatives, his nomination to the Federal Home Loan Bank Board was rejected by the U.S. Senate. From the late 1970s to the early 1980s, he was the president of Southeastern Legal Foundation. He was a member of the Republican Party.

== Early life and career ==
Born in Atlanta on February 14, 1927 to Benjamin Bentley Blackburn Jr. and Sarah (Medlock) Blackburn, he attended public school there and graduated in 1947 from the University of North Carolina at Chapel Hill, North Carolina, and in 1954 from the Emory University School of Law in Atlanta. During World War II, Blackburn served in the United States Navy from 1944 to 1946 and again during the Korean War from 1950 to 1952. He was retired as a lieutenant commander in the United States Navy Reserve. He served in the State attorney general's office from 1955 to 1957. He was admitted to the bar in 1954 and commenced private practice in Atlanta after service with the attorney general.

In 1966, Blackburn was elected to the 90th United States Congress, having narrowly defeated freshman incumbent James Mackay by 360 votes: 55,249 (50.2 percent) to 54,889 (49.8 percent). In that same election fellow Republican Bo Callaway challenged the Democrat Lester Maddox, a strong segregationist from Atlanta, in the 1966 gubernatorial race. Though Callaway led Maddox by some three thousand votes, he did not have the required majority; under the Georgia Constitution, the state legislature broke the impasse by electing Maddox. Blackburn supported Callaway, who as a congressman had sought to curb the high costs of federal social programs. Years later, Blackburn described Maddox as a "far better governor than his critics will ever admit." Then out of office himself, Blackburn noted that no claim of corruption arose against Maddox, whose administration was characterized by economic development and the appointment of African Americans to state executive positions. Blackburn was reelected to Congress in the three succeeding terms but was unsuccessful in a campaign for reelection in 1974.

In 1975, President of the United States Gerald Ford nominated him to serve as a member of the Federal Home Loan Bank Board. On November 12, his nomination was rejected by the United States Senate Committee on Banking, Housing, and Urban Affairs in an 8–5 vote. Blackburn served as president of the Southeastern Legal Foundation from 1976 to 1985. In 1982, he ran for Governor of Georgia, but was defeated in the Republican primary by Georgia State Senate member Bob Bell, 36,347 (59.2 percent) to 25,063 (40.8 percent). Bell then lost in the general election to the Democrat Joe Frank Harris.

== Personal life and death ==
Blackburn married the former Mary Antonia Pandora, a native of San Pedro, Los Angeles in California, on February 23, 1952 at the chapel of the United States Naval Station in San Diego upon his return from his second tour of duty off the coast of Korea, after they met in 1949 when she was a nurse for the United States Navy at Naval Hospital Bremerton in the town of Bremerton, Washington. Together, they had four children and 11 grandchildren. Mary died on June 10, 2018. Blackburn died on December 3, 2024 in Jasper, Georgia, aged 97.

== Electoral history ==
Georgia's 4th congressional district:

Year	Republican	Votes	%	Democratic	Votes	%
1966	√ Benjamin B. Blackburn	55,249	50.2%	James MacKay	54,889	49.8%
1968	√ Benjamin B. Blackburn	78,753	57.5%	James MacKay	58,154	42.5%
1970	√ Benjamin B. Blackburn	85,848	65.2%	Franklin Shumake	45,908	34.8%
1972	√ Benjamin B. Blackburn	103,155	75.9%	F. Odell Welborn	32,731	24.1%
1974	Benjamin B. Blackburn	49,922	44.9%	√ Elliott H. Levitas	61,211	55.1%

== Sources ==
- United States Congress. "Benjamin B. Blackburn (id: B000506)". Biographical Directory of the United States Congress. Retrieved on 2009-05-13

U.S. House of Representatives
Preceded by James MacKay	Member of the U.S. House of Representatives from Georgia's 4th congressional district January 3, 1967 – January 3, 1975	Succeeded by Elliott H. Levitas
