= Henry R. Harris =

American politician (1828–1909)

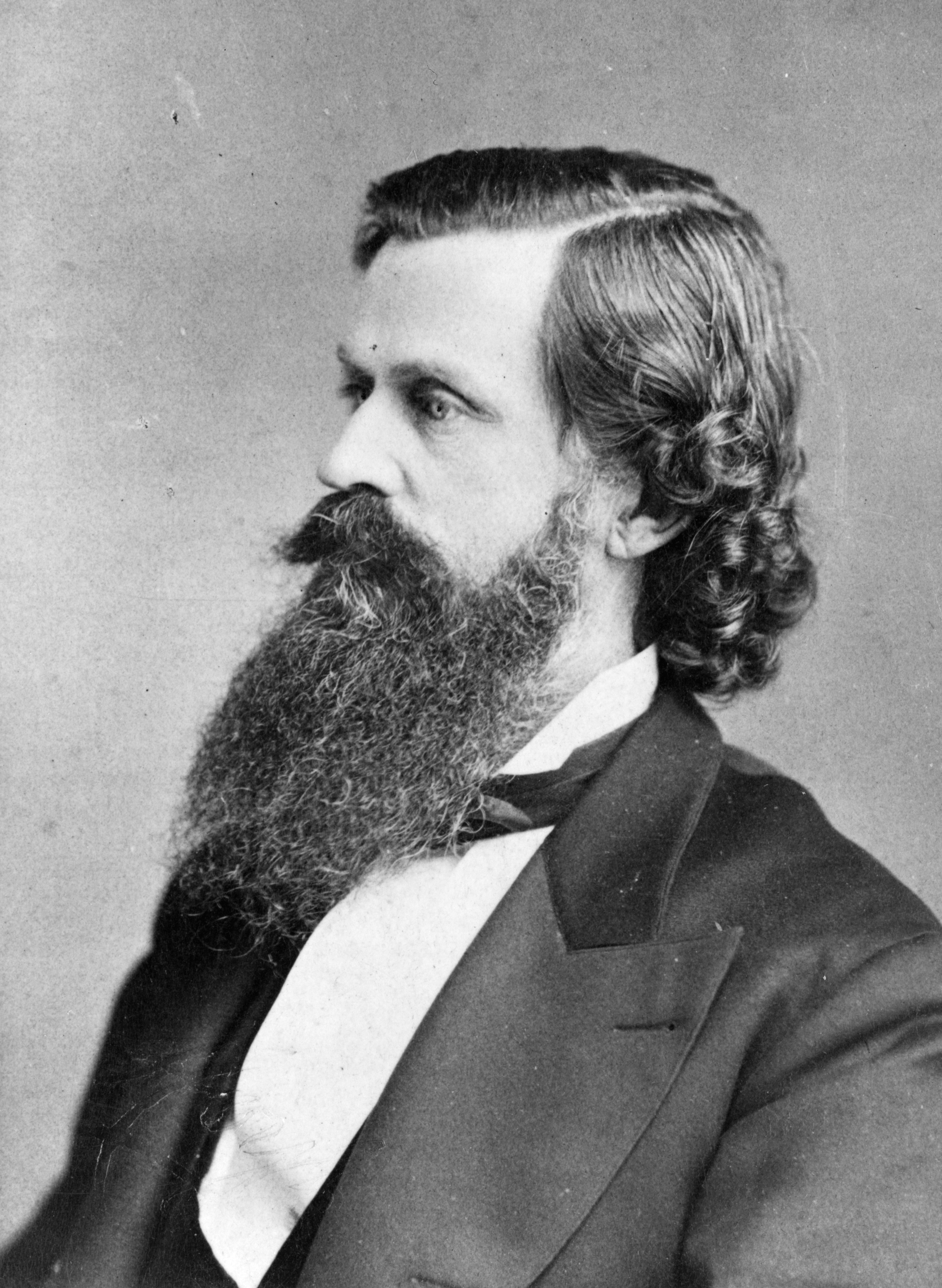

Member of the U.S. House of Representatives from Georgia's 4th district
- In office March 4, 1885 – March 3, 1887
- Preceded by: Hugh Buchanan
- Succeeded by: Thomas W. Grimes
- In office March 4, 1873 – March 3, 1879
- Preceded by: Erasmus W. Beck
- Succeeded by: Henry Persons

Personal details
- Born: February 2, 1828 Sparta, Georgia, U.S.
- Died: October 15, 1909 (aged 81) Odessadale, Georgia, U.S.
- Resting place: Greenville Cemetery, Greenville, Georgia, U.S.
- Party: Democratic

Military service
- Allegiance: Confederate States of America
- Branch/service: Confederate States Army
- Rank: Colonel
- Battles/wars: American Civil War

Henry Richard Harris (February 2, 1828 – October 15, 1909) was an American politician and army officer who served as U.S. Representative from Georgia.

Born in Sparta, Georgia, Harris moved to Greenville, Georgia, in 1833. He attended an academy in Mount Zion, Georgia, and was graduated from Emory College at Oxford, Georgia, in 1847. He served as a member of the State constitutional convention in 1861. During the Civil War, he served in the Confederate States Army as a colonel.

Harris was elected as a Democrat to the Forty-third, Forty-fourth, and Forty-fifth Congresses (March 4, 1873 – March 3, 1879). He was an unsuccessful candidate for reelection in 1878 to the Forty-sixth Congress.

Harris was elected to the Forty-ninth Congress (March 4, 1885 – March 3, 1887). He was not a candidate for renomination in 1886. He was appointed by President Cleveland as Third Assistant Postmaster General of the United States and served from April 1, 1887, to March 18, 1889. He engaged in agricultural pursuits. He died in Odessadale, Georgia, October 15, 1909. He was interred in Greenville Cemetery, Greenville, Georgia.

The community of Harris City, Georgia was founded by and named after the family of Henry R. Harris.

U.S. House of Representatives
Preceded by Erasmus W. Beck	Member of the U.S. House of Representatives from Georgia's 4th congressional district March 4, 1873 – March 3, 1879	Succeeded by Henry Persons
Preceded by Hugh Buchanan	Member of the U.S. House of Representatives from Georgia's 4th congressional district March 4, 1885 – March 3, 1887	Succeeded by Thomas W. Grimes
