= Southeastern Legal Foundation =

US non-profit organization

Coordinates: 33.9739°N 84.4869°W

The Southeastern Legal Foundation is a conservative non-profit constitutional public interest law firm and policy center in the United States. It was founded in 1976 and has its headquarters in Roswell, Georgia.

== Organization ==
The Southeastern Legal Foundation represents individuals, businesses, and organizations in courts of law to defend the ideals of: limited government, individual freedoms, and government deregulation. In addition to the specific legal services offered, the SLF provides pro bono legal representation for constitutional matters.

== Cases ==
As of 2010, The Southeastern Legal Foundation has filed a petition challenging the United States Environmental Protection Agency's December 7, 2009 findings which claim primarily that the "atmosphere threatens the public health and welfare of current and future generations", but also it hold humans as the responsible cause.
