= Joel Abbot (politician) =

American politician (1776–1826)

Member of the U.S. House of Representatives from Georgia's at-large district
- In office March 4, 1817 – March 3, 1825
- Preceded by: Richard H. Wilde
- Succeeded by: Charles E. Haynes

Personal details
- Born: March 17, 1776 Fairfield, Connecticut
- Died: November 19, 1826 (aged 50) Lexington, Georgia
- Party: Democratic-Republican Party
- Occupation: Physician

Joel Abbot (March 17, 1776 – November 19, 1826) was a United States representative from Georgia. He practiced as a medical doctor. He was a slaveholder.

== Early years ==
Abbot was born in Ridgefield, Connecticut on March 17, 1776. After studying at an academy and at a medical school he moved to Washington, Georgia, in 1794 and practiced medicine.

== Career ==
He was a member of the Washington, Georgia city council. He also served as a member of the Georgia House of Representatives, 1799, 1802–1804, 1808, and 1811. He was elected as a Republican to the 15th United States Congress and was reelected as a Republican to the two succeeding Congresses (16th and 17th), Abbott then successfully ran for reelection as a Crawford Republican to the 18th Congress and his congressional service spanned from March 4, 1817, to March 3, 1825.

== Last years ==
After his congressional service, Abbott returned to the practice of medicine. He was also a delegate to the convention in Philadelphia, Pennsylvania to prepare the first National Pharmacopoeia. He died on November 19, 1826, in Lexington, Georgia, and was buried in a family plot behind his home in Washington, Ga. His wife and daughter were also laid to rest in the family plot. In 1897 Dr. Abbot and his wife and daughter whose “remains” were moved from the family plot on land known now as The Robert Toombs Historic Site by Kate Colley, niece of General Toombs, to Resthaven Cemetery in Washington, Georgia. Marker in Cemetery is for Sarah, but mentions Dr. Abbot.

U.S. House of Representatives
Preceded by Richard H. Wilde	Member of the U.S. House of Representatives from Georgia's at-large congressional district March 4, 1817 – March 3, 1825	Succeeded by Charles E. Haynes
