= Thomas Hardeman Jr. =

American politician

Thomas Hardeman, Jr.
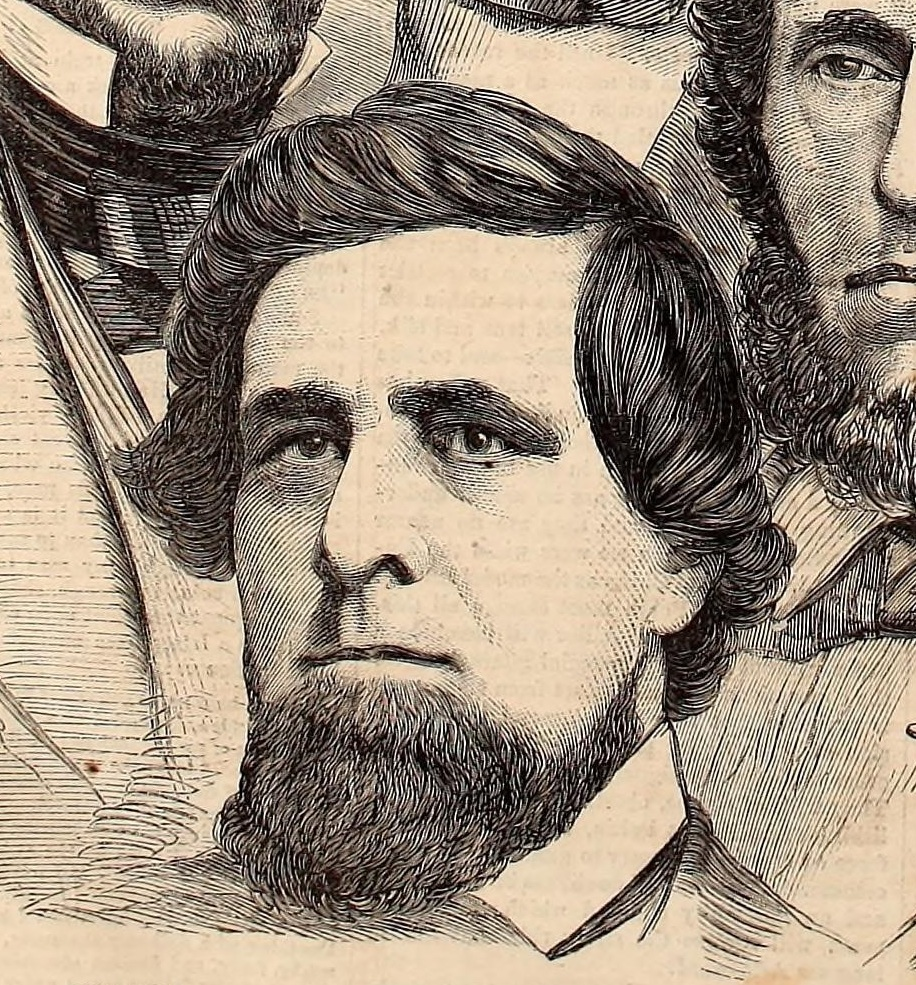

Speaker of the Georgia House of Representatives
- In office 1863-1865; 1875-1877
- Preceded by: Warren Akin Sr. (first term); Augustus Octavius Bacon (second term)
- Succeeded by: Robert McWhorter (first term); Augustus Octavius Bacon (second term)

Member of the U.S. House of Representatives from Georgia's 3rd district
- In office March 4, 1859 – January 23, 1861
- Preceded by: Robert P. Trippe
- Succeeded by: American Civil War

Member of the U.S. House of Representatives from Georgia's at-large district
- In office March 4, 1883 – March 3, 1885
- Preceded by: District established
- Succeeded by: George T. Barnes

Member of the Georgia House of Representatives
- In office 1853-1859; 1863-1865; 1875-1877

Personal details
- Born: January 12, 1825 Eatonton, Georgia, U.S.
- Died: March 6, 1891 (aged 66) Macon, Georgia, U.S.
- Resting place: Rose Hill Cemetery (Macon, Georgia); 32.84646°N 83.63329°W
- Party: Opposition Party 1858–1860; Democratic Party 1863–1885
- Education: Emory College
- Occupation: Politician and soldier

Military service
- Allegiance: Confederate States of America
- Branch/service: Confederate States Army
- Years of service: 1861–65 (CSA)
- Rank: Colonel (CSA)
- Unit: 2nd Georgia Battalion (CSA); 45th Georgia Infantry (CSA)

Thomas Hardeman Jr. (January 12, 1825 – March 6, 1891) was an American politician, lawyer and soldier.

== Early years ==
Hardeman was born in Eatonton, Georgia and graduated from Emory College in 1845. He studied and was admitted to the state bar in 1847. Rather than practicing law, he pursued interests in the warehouse and commission business.

== Political and military service ==
After serving in the Georgia House of Representatives in 1853, 1855, and 1857, Hardeman was elected in 1858 as an Opposition Party candidate to the 36th United States Congress as a Representative of Georgia's 3rd congressional district and served a partial term from March 4, 1859, until January 23, 1861, when he resigned to become a captain in the Floyd Rifles.

During the American Civil War, Hardeman was major of the 2nd Georgia Battalion in the Confederate States Army. Later, he became a colonel in the 45th Georgia Infantry, a regiment he organized.

During the war, he served in the Georgia House of Representatives in 1863, 1864, and 1874. Hardeman served as the Speaker of the House from 1863 to 1865, and again in 1875–1877.

After the war, Hardeman was a delegate to the 1872 Democratic National Convention. He was also president of the State convention and chairman of the Democratic State executive committee for four years. In 1882, Hardeman won the election again to the U.S. House of Representatives as an at-large Democrat to the 48th United States Congress. He served one term from March 4, 1883, to March 3, 1885.

== Death ==
Thomas Hardeman Jr. died in Macon, Georgia, on March 6, 1891, and was buried in that city's Rose Hill Cemetery. The Colonel Thomas Hardeman Jr. Chapter 2170 of the United Daughters of the Confederacy was named in his honor. Hardeman Avenue in downtown Macon, Georgia, was also named for him.

== See also ==
- List of speakers of the Georgia House of Representatives

U.S. House of Representatives
| Preceded by Robert Pleasant Trippe | Member of the U.S. House of Representatives from Georgia's 3rd congressional district March 4, 1859 – January 23, 1861 | Succeeded by American Civil War |
| Preceded by New at-large seat resulting from congressional apportionment | Member of the U.S. House of Representatives from Georgia's at-large congressional district March 4, 1883 – March 3, 1885 | Succeeded by George T. Barnes |
