= Thomas J. Speer =

American politician (1837–1872)

Member of the U.S. House of Representatives from Georgia's 4th district
- In office March 4, 1871 – August 18, 1872
- Preceded by: Jefferson F. Long
- Succeeded by: Erasmus W. Beck

Personal details
- Born: August 31, 1837 Monroe County, Georgia
- Died: August 18, 1872 (aged 34) Barnesville, Georgia
- Party: Republican

Thomas Jefferson Speer (August 31, 1837 – August 18, 1872) was a U.S. representative from Georgia.

Born in Monroe County, Georgia, Speer attended the common schools. He engaged in mercantile pursuits and as a planter.

Speer was elected Justice of the Peace in 1861 and reelected in 1865. He was appointed collector of Confederate taxes for Pike County in June 1863, serving until the end of the American Civil War.

Speer was elected justice of the inferior court for Pike County in 1865, serving until July 1868. He served as delegate to the State constitutional convention in 1867–1868. He served as member of the Georgia State Senate from 1868 to 1870.

Speer was elected as a Republican to the Forty-second Congress and served from March 4, 1871, until his death in Barnesville, Georgia, August 18, 1872. He was interred in Zebulon Street Cemetery.

== See also ==
- List of members of the United States Congress who died in office (1790–1899)

U.S. House of Representatives
Preceded by Jefferson F. Long	Member of the U.S. House of Representatives from Georgia's 4th congressional district March 4, 1871 – August 18, 1872	Succeeded by Erasmus W. Beck
