= Charles E. Haynes =

American politician

Member of the U.S. House of Representatives from Georgia
- In office March 4, 1835 – March 3, 1839
- Preceded by: Seaborn Jones
- Succeeded by: Lott Warren
- Constituency: At-large district
- In office March 4, 1825 – March 3, 1831
- Preceded by: Joel Abbot
- Succeeded by: George R. Gilmer
- Constituency: At-large district (1825–1827); 5th district (1827–1829); At-large district (1829–1831)

Personal details
- Born: Charles Eaton Haynes; April 15, 1784 Brunswick, Virginia, U.S.
- Died: August 29, 1841 (aged 57)
- Party: Jacksonian
- Education: University of Pennsylvania

Charles Eaton Haynes (April 15, 1784 – August 29, 1841) was an American politician and medical doctor.

== Early years and education ==
Haynes was born in Brunswick, Virginia, in Mecklenburg County in 1784, Haynes graduated from the University of Pennsylvania School of Medicine in Philadelphia, Pennsylvania, and practiced medicine.

== Political career ==
Haynes was elected as a Jacksonian Representative of Georgia to the 19th, 20th and 21st United States Congresses and served from March 4, 1825, until March 3, 1831. He lost his bid for reelection in 1830 to the 22nd Congress and ran another unsuccessful campaign for the 23rd Congress.

Haynes returned to the U.S. Congress as a Jacksonian after winning election to the 24th Congress and reelection to that seat for the 25th Congress. His return to Congress spanned from March 4, 1835, until March 3, 1839.

== Death and legacy ==
Haynes died on August 29, 1841, and was buried in Sparta, Georgia.

U.S. House of Representatives
Preceded by Joel Abbot	Member of the U.S. House of Representatives from Georgia's at-large congressional district March 4, 1825 – March 3, 1827	Succeeded by District elections
Preceded by At Large districts	Member of the U.S. House of Representatives from Georgia's 5th congressional district March 4, 1827 – March 3, 1829	Succeeded by At Large districts
Preceded by District elections	Member of the U.S. House of Representatives from Georgia's at-large congressional district March 4, 1829 – March 3, 1831	Succeeded by George Rockingham Gilmer
Preceded by Seaborn Jones	Member of the U.S. House of Representatives from Georgia's at-large congressional district March 4, 1835 – March 3, 1839	Succeeded by Lott Warren
