= George Barnes (Georgia politician) =

American politician (1833–1901)

George Thomas Barnes
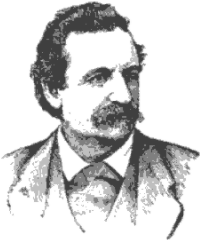

Member of the U.S. House of Representatives from Georgia's 10th district
- In office March 4, 1885 – March 3, 1891
- Preceded by: Thomas Hardeman, Jr.
- Succeeded by: Thomas E. Watson

Member of the Georgia House of Representatives
- In office 1860–1865

Personal details
- Born: August 14, 1833 Augusta, Georgia, U.S.
- Died: October 24, 1901 (aged 68) Augusta, Georgia, U.S.
- Party: Democratic
- Occupation: Lawyer

Military service
- Allegiance: Confederate States Army
- Branch/service: Confederate States Army
- Rank: Major
- Unit: Washington Light Artillery Company
- Battles/wars: American Civil War

George Thomas Barnes (August 14, 1833 – October 24, 1901) was a Georgia state legislator, military officer, and United States Representative.

== Biography ==
Barnes was born in the Summerville suburb of Augusta, Georgia. He graduated from the University of Georgia (UGA) in Athens in 1855 with a Bachelor of Arts (A.B. degree. He was admitted to the state bar in 1855 and became a practicing lawyer in Augusta.

During the American Civil War, Barnes served as a second lieutenant and major brevet in the Confederate States Army as a member of the Washington Light Artillery Company. He was also a member of the Georgia House of Representatives from 1860 through 1865. From 1876 through 1884, Barnes served on the Democratic National Committee.

In 1884, Barnes was elected as a Democrat to the 49th United States Congress as the Representative for Georgia's 10th congressional district. He was re-elected to that position for two additional terms before losing his bid for reelection in 1890. After his congressional service, Barnes returned to the practice of law. Barnes was a UGA trustee for the last two years of his life before dying in Augusta on October 24, 1901. He was buried in City Cemetery in that same city.

U.S. House of Representatives
Preceded by Thomas Hardeman, Jr.	Member of the U.S. House of Representatives from Georgia's 10th congressional district March 4, 1885 – March 3, 1891	Succeeded by Thomas E. Watson
