= Lott Warren =

American politician

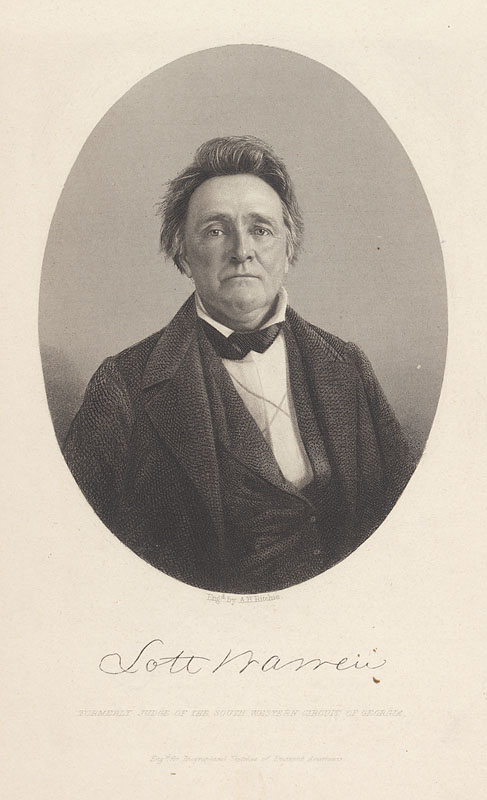

Member of the U.S. House of Representatives from Georgia's at-large district
- In office March 4, 1839 – March 3, 1843
- Preceded by: Charles E. Haynes
- Succeeded by: Seat abolished

Member of the Georgia Senate
- In office 1830

Member of the Georgia House of Representatives
- In office 1824–1831

Personal details
- Born: October 30, 1797 Burke County, Georgia, U.S.
- Died: June 17, 1861 (aged 63) Albany, Georgia, U.S.
- Party: Whig

Lott Warren (October 30, 1797 – June 17, 1861) was a United States representative from Georgia. He was born in Burke County, Georgia near Augusta, Georgia. He attended the common schools and then moved to Dublin, Georgia in 1816. He served as a second lieutenant of Volunteers in the expedition against the Seminoles in 1818. He studied law and was admitted to the bar in 1821 and commenced practice in Dublin, Georgia. He was also a regularly ordained Baptist minister, but never filled a definite charge.

Warren moved to Marion, Georgia, in 1825 and was elected a major of the state militia in 1823. He served as a member of the Georgia House of Representatives in 1824 and 1831. He also served in the Georgia Senate in 1830. He was solicitor general and judge of the southern circuit of Georgia 1831–1834. He moved to Americus, Georgia in 1836 and was elected as a Whig to the 26th and 27th Congresses (March 4, 1839 - March 3, 1843). He was not a candidate for renomination in 1842. He moved to Albany, Georgia in 1842 and was judge of the superior court of Georgia 1843–1852. He resumed the practice of his of law and died in Albany, Georgia, in 1861 and was buried in Riverside Cemetery.

U.S. House of Representatives
Preceded by Charles Eaton Haynes	Member of the U.S. House of Representatives from Georgia's at-large congressional district March 4, 1839 – March 3, 1843	Succeeded by Seat became defunct after congressional apportionment
