= Georgia's 4th congressional district =

U.S. House district for Georgia

Coordinates: 33°41′59″N 84°03′02″W

- Interactive map of district boundaries since January 3, 2025
- Representative: Hank Johnson; D–Lithonia
- Distribution: 96.1% urban; 3.9% rural
- Population (2025): 765,730
- Median household income: $78,896
- Ethnicity: 47.5% Black; 19.7% White; 19.2% Hispanic; 9.6% Asian; 3.1% Two or more races; 0.8% other
- Cook PVI: D+27

Georgia's 4th congressional district is a congressional district in the U.S. state of Georgia. The district is currently represented by Democrat Hank Johnson, though the district's boundaries have been redrawn following the 2010 census, which granted an additional congressional seat to Georgia. The first election using the new district boundaries (listed below) were the 2012 congressional elections.

The newly drawn district retains its majority African-American status and includes many of Atlanta's inner eastern suburbs, such as Conyers, Covington, Decatur, Lilburn, Stone Mountain, and Lithonia.

== Composition ==
For the 119th and successive Congresses (based on the districts drawn following a 2023 court order), the district contains all or portions of the following counties and communities.

DeKalb County (15)

Belvedere Park (part; also 5th), Brookhaven (part; also 5th), Candler-McAfee (part; also 5th), Chamblee, Clarkston, Doraville, Dunwoody, Lithonia, Panthersville, Pine Lake, Redan, Scottdale (part; also 5th), Stonecrest, Stone Mountain, Tucker (part; also 5th)

Gwinnett County (5)

Berkeley Lake, Duluth, Norcross, Peachtree Corners, Suwanee (part; also 9th)

== Recent election results from statewide races ==
Year	Office	Results
2008	President	Obama 74% - 25%
2012	President	Obama 75% - 25%
2016	President	Clinton 76% - 21%
2016	Senate	Barksdale 69% - 27%
2018	Governor	Abrams 79% - 20%
2018	Lt. Governor	Riggs Amico 79% - 21%
2018	Attorney General	Bailey 78% - 22%
2020	President	Biden 78% - 21%
2021	Senate (Reg.)	Ossoff 80% - 20%
2021	Senate (Spec.)	Warnock 80% - 20%
2022	Senate	Warnock 82% - 18%
2022	Governor	Abrams 76% - 24%
2022	Lt. Governor	Bailey 76% - 22%
2022	Secretary of State	Nguyen 73% - 25%
2022	Attorney General	Jordan 76% - 22%
2024	President	Harris 76% - 23%

== List of members representing the district ==
Member	Party	Years	Cong ress	Electoral history	District geography
District created March 4, 1827
Wilson Lumpkin (Madison)	Jacksonian	March 4, 1827 – March 3, 1829	20th	Elected in 1826. Redistricted to the at-large district.	1827–1829 [data missing]
District inactive		March 4, 1829 – March 3, 1845			
Hugh A. Haralson (La Grange)	Democratic	March 4, 1845 – March 3, 1851	29th 30th 31st	Redistricted from the at-large district and re-elected in 1844. Re-elected in 1846. Re-elected in 1848. [data missing]	1845–1853 [data missing]
Charles Murphey (Decatur)	Constitutional Union	March 4, 1851 – March 3, 1853	32nd	Elected in 1851. [data missing]	1845–1853 [data missing]
William B. W. Dent (Newnan)	Democratic	March 4, 1853 – March 3, 1855	33rd	Elected in 1853. [data missing]	1853–1861 [data missing]
Hiram B. Warner (Greenville)	Democratic	March 4, 1855 – March 3, 1857	34th	Elected in 1855. [data missing]	1853–1861 [data missing]
Lucius J. Gartrell (Atlanta)	Democratic	March 4, 1857 – January 23, 1861	35th 36th	Elected in 1857. Re-elected in 1859. Resigned.	1853–1861 [data missing]
Vacant		January 23, 1861 – July 25, 1868	36th 37th 38th 39th 40th	Civil War and Reconstruction	
Samuel F. Gove (Griswoldville)	Republican	July 25, 1868 – March 3, 1869	40th	Was credentialed for the 41th Congress but was deemed not entitled since the credentials were based on the same election that had seated him the 40th Congress.	1868–1873 [data missing]
Vacant		March 4, 1869 – January 15, 1871	41st		1868–1873 [data missing]
Jefferson F. Long (Macon)	Republican	January 16, 1871 – March 3, 1871	41st	Elected to finish Gove's term. [data missing]	1868–1873 [data missing]
Thomas J. Speer (Barnesville)	Republican	March 4, 1871 – August 18, 1872	42nd	Elected in 1870. Died.	1868–1873 [data missing]
Vacant		August 18, 1872 – December 2, 1872	42nd		1868–1873 [data missing]
Erasmus W. Beck (Griffin)	Democratic	December 2, 1872 – March 3, 1873	42nd	Elected to finish Speer's term.	1868–1873 [data missing]
Henry R. Harris (Greenville)	Democratic	March 4, 1873 – March 3, 1879	43rd 44th 45th	Elected in 1872. Re-elected in 1874. Re-elected in 1876. [data missing]	1873–1883 [data missing]
Henry Persons (Geneva)	Independent Democratic	March 4, 1879 – March 3, 1881	46th	Elected in 1878. [data missing]	1873–1883 [data missing]
Hugh Buchanan (Newnan)	Democratic	March 4, 1881 – March 3, 1885	47th 48th	Elected in 1880. Re-elected in 1882. [data missing]	1873–1883 [data missing]
Hugh Buchanan (Newnan)	Democratic	March 4, 1881 – March 3, 1885	47th 48th	Elected in 1880. Re-elected in 1882. [data missing]	1883–1893 [data missing]
Henry R. Harris (Greenville)	Democratic	March 4, 1885 – March 3, 1887	49th	Elected in 1884. [data missing]	1883–1893 [data missing]
Thomas W. Grimes (Columbus)	Democratic	March 4, 1887 – March 3, 1891	50th 51st	Elected in 1886. Re-elected in 1888. [data missing]	1883–1893 [data missing]
Charles L. Moses (Turin)	Democratic	March 4, 1891 – March 3, 1897	52nd 53rd 54th	Elected in 1890. Re-elected in 1892. Re-elected in 1894. [data missing]	1883–1893 [data missing]
Charles L. Moses (Turin)	Democratic	March 4, 1891 – March 3, 1897	52nd 53rd 54th	Elected in 1890. Re-elected in 1892. Re-elected in 1894. [data missing]	1893–1903 [data missing]
William C. Adamson (Carrollton)	Democratic	March 4, 1897 – December 18, 1917	55th 56th 57th 58th 59th 60th 61st 62nd 63rd 64th 65th	Elected in 1896. Re-elected in 1898. Re-elected in 1900. Re-elected in 1902. Re-elected in 1904. Re-elected in 1906. Re-elected in 1908. Re-elected in 1910. Re-elected in 1912. Re-elected in 1914. Re-elected in 1916. Resigned to become member of the Board of U.S. General Appraisers.	1893–1903 [data missing]
William C. Adamson (Carrollton)	Democratic	March 4, 1897 – December 18, 1917	55th 56th 57th 58th 59th 60th 61st 62nd 63rd 64th 65th	Elected in 1896. Re-elected in 1898. Re-elected in 1900. Re-elected in 1902. Re-elected in 1904. Re-elected in 1906. Re-elected in 1908. Re-elected in 1910. Re-elected in 1912. Re-elected in 1914. Re-elected in 1916. Resigned to become member of the Board of U.S. General Appraisers.	1903–1913 [data missing]
William C. Adamson (Carrollton)	Democratic	March 4, 1897 – December 18, 1917	55th 56th 57th 58th 59th 60th 61st 62nd 63rd 64th 65th	Elected in 1896. Re-elected in 1898. Re-elected in 1900. Re-elected in 1902. Re-elected in 1904. Re-elected in 1906. Re-elected in 1908. Re-elected in 1910. Re-elected in 1912. Re-elected in 1914. Re-elected in 1916. Resigned to become member of the Board of U.S. General Appraisers.	1913–1933 [data missing]
Vacant		December 18, 1917 – January 16, 1918	65th		1913–1933 [data missing]
William C. Wright (Newnan)	Democratic	January 16, 1918 – March 3, 1933	65th 66th 67th 68th 69th 70th 71st 72nd	Elected to finish Adamson's term. Re-elected in 1918. Re-elected in 1920. Re-elected in 1922. Re-elected in 1924. Re-elected in 1926. Re-elected in 1928. Re-elected in 1930. [data missing]	1913–1933 [data missing]
Emmett M. Owen (Griffin)	Democratic	March 4, 1933 – June 21, 1939	73rd 74th 75th 76th	Elected in 1932. Re-elected in 1934. Re-elected in 1936. Re-elected in 1938. Died.	1933–1943 [data missing]
Vacant		June 21, 1939 – August 1, 1939	76th		1933–1943 [data missing]
A. Sidney Camp (Newnan)	Democratic	August 1, 1939 – July 24, 1954	76th 77th 78th 79th 80th 81st 82nd 83rd	Elected to finish Owen's term. Re-elected in 1940. Re-elected in 1942. Re-elected in 1944. Re-elected in 1946. Re-elected in 1948. Re-elected in 1950. Re-elected in 1952. Died.	1933–1943 [data missing]
A. Sidney Camp (Newnan)	Democratic	August 1, 1939 – July 24, 1954	76th 77th 78th 79th 80th 81st 82nd 83rd	Elected to finish Owen's term. Re-elected in 1940. Re-elected in 1942. Re-elected in 1944. Re-elected in 1946. Re-elected in 1948. Re-elected in 1950. Re-elected in 1952. Died.	1943–1953 [data missing]
A. Sidney Camp (Newnan)	Democratic	August 1, 1939 – July 24, 1954	76th 77th 78th 79th 80th 81st 82nd 83rd	Elected to finish Owen's term. Re-elected in 1940. Re-elected in 1942. Re-elected in 1944. Re-elected in 1946. Re-elected in 1948. Re-elected in 1950. Re-elected in 1952. Died.	1953–1963 [data missing]
Vacant		July 24, 1954 – November 2, 1954	83rd		1953–1963 [data missing]
John Flynt (Griffin)	Democratic	November 2, 1954 – January 3, 1965	83rd 84th 85th 86th 87th 88th	Elected to finish Camp's term. Re-elected in 1954. Re-elected in 1956. Re-elected in 1958. Re-elected in 1960. Re-elected in 1962. Redistricted to the 6th district.	1953–1963 [data missing]
John Flynt (Griffin)	Democratic	November 2, 1954 – January 3, 1965	83rd 84th 85th 86th 87th 88th	Elected to finish Camp's term. Re-elected in 1954. Re-elected in 1956. Re-elected in 1958. Re-elected in 1960. Re-elected in 1962. Redistricted to the 6th district.	1963–1973 [data missing]
James MacKay (Atlanta)	Democratic	January 3, 1965 – January 3, 1967	89th	Elected in 1964. [data missing]	1963–1973 [data missing]
Benjamin B. Blackburn (Atlanta)	Republican	January 3, 1967 – January 3, 1975	90th 91st 92nd 93rd	Elected in 1966. Re-elected in 1968. Re-elected in 1970. Re-elected in 1972. [data missing]	1963–1973 [data missing]
Benjamin B. Blackburn (Atlanta)	Republican	January 3, 1967 – January 3, 1975	90th 91st 92nd 93rd	Elected in 1966. Re-elected in 1968. Re-elected in 1970. Re-elected in 1972. [data missing]	1973–1983 [data missing]
Elliott H. Levitas (Atlanta)	Democratic	January 3, 1975 – January 3, 1985	94th 95th 96th 97th 98th	Elected in 1974. Re-elected in 1976. Re-elected in 1978. Re-elected in 1980. Re-elected in 1982. Lost re-election.	1973–1983 [data missing]
Elliott H. Levitas (Atlanta)	Democratic	January 3, 1975 – January 3, 1985	94th 95th 96th 97th 98th	Elected in 1974. Re-elected in 1976. Re-elected in 1978. Re-elected in 1980. Re-elected in 1982. Lost re-election.	1983–1993 [data missing]
Pat Swindall (Dunwoody)	Republican	January 3, 1985 – January 3, 1989	99th 100th	Elected in 1984. Re-elected in 1986. Lost re-election.	1983–1993 [data missing]
Ben Jones (Covington)	Democratic	January 3, 1989 – January 3, 1993	101st 102nd	Elected in 1988. Re-elected in 1990. Redistricted to the 10th district and lost renomination	1983–1993 [data missing]
John Linder (Atlanta)	Republican	January 3, 1993 – January 3, 1997	103rd 104th	Elected in 1992. Re-elected in 1994. Redistricted to the 11th district.	1993–2003 [data missing]
Cynthia McKinney (Decatur)	Democratic	January 3, 1997 – January 3, 2003	105th 106th 107th	Redistricted from the 11th district and re-elected in 1996. Re-elected in 1998. Re-elected in 2000. Lost renomination.	1993–2003 [data missing]
Denise Majette (Decatur)	Democratic	January 3, 2003 – January 3, 2005	108th	Elected in 2002. Retired to run for U.S. Senator.	2003–2007
Cynthia McKinney (Stone Mountain)	Democratic	January 3, 2005 – January 3, 2007	109th	Elected in 2004. Lost renomination.	2003–2007
Hank Johnson (Lithonia)	Democratic	January 3, 2007 – present	110th 111th 112th 113th 114th 115th 116th 117th 118th 119th	Elected in 2006. Re-elected in 2008. Re-elected in 2010. Re-elected in 2012. Re-elected in 2014. Re-elected in 2016. Re-elected in 2018. Re-elected in 2020. Re-elected in 2022. Re-elected in 2024. Re-elected in 2026.	2007–2013
Hank Johnson (Lithonia)	Democratic	January 3, 2007 – present	110th 111th 112th 113th 114th 115th 116th 117th 118th 119th	Elected in 2006. Re-elected in 2008. Re-elected in 2010. Re-elected in 2012. Re-elected in 2014. Re-elected in 2016. Re-elected in 2018. Re-elected in 2020. Re-elected in 2022. Re-elected in 2024. Re-elected in 2026.	2013–2023
Hank Johnson (Lithonia)	Democratic	January 3, 2007 – present	110th 111th 112th 113th 114th 115th 116th 117th 118th 119th	Elected in 2006. Re-elected in 2008. Re-elected in 2010. Re-elected in 2012. Re-elected in 2014. Re-elected in 2016. Re-elected in 2018. Re-elected in 2020. Re-elected in 2022. Re-elected in 2024. Re-elected in 2026.	2023–2025
Hank Johnson (Lithonia)	Democratic	January 3, 2007 – present	110th 111th 112th 113th 114th 115th 116th 117th 118th 119th	Elected in 2006. Re-elected in 2008. Re-elected in 2010. Re-elected in 2012. Re-elected in 2014. Re-elected in 2016. Re-elected in 2018. Re-elected in 2020. Re-elected in 2022. Re-elected in 2024. Re-elected in 2026.	2025–present

== Election results ==
=== 2002 ===
Georgia's 4th Congressional District Election (2002)
Party	Candidate	Votes	%
Democratic	Denise Majette	118,045	77.03
Republican	Cynthia Van Auken	35,202	22.97
Total votes		153,247	100.00
Democratic hold			

=== 2004 ===
Georgia's 4th Congressional District Election (2004)
Party	Candidate	Votes	%
Democratic	Cynthia McKinney	157,461	63.76
Republican	Catherine Davis	89,509	36.24
Total votes		246,970	100.00
Democratic hold			

=== 2006 ===
Georgia's 4th Congressional District Election (2006)
Party	Candidate	Votes	%
Democratic	Hank Johnson	106,352	75.32
Republican	Catherine Davis	34,778	24.63
No party	Others	64	0.05
Total votes		141,194	100.00
Democratic hold			

=== 2008 ===
Georgia's 4th Congressional District Election (2008)
Party	Candidate	Votes	%
Democratic	Hank Johnson (incumbent)	224,494	99.91
No party	Others	200	0.09
Total votes		224,694	100.00
Democratic hold			

=== 2010 ===
Georgia's 4th Congressional District Election (2010)
Party	Candidate	Votes	%
Democratic	Hank Johnson (incumbent)	131,760	74.67
Republican	Liz Carter	44,707	25.33
Total votes		176,467	100.00
Democratic hold			

=== 2012 ===
Georgia's 4th Congressional District Election (2012)
Party	Candidate	Votes	%
Democratic	Hank Johnson (incumbent)	208,861	73.57
Republican	J. Chris Vaughn	75,041	26.43
Green	Cynthia McKinney (write-in)	58	0.02
Total votes		283,960	100.00
Democratic hold			

=== 2014 ===
Georgia's 4th Congressional District Election (2014)
Party	Candidate	Votes	%
Democratic	Hank Johnson (incumbent)	161,211	100
Total votes		161,211	100
Democratic hold			

=== 2016 ===
Georgia's 4th Congressional District Election (2016)
Party	Candidate	Votes	%
Democratic	Hank Johnson (incumbent)	220,146	75.72
Republican	Victor Armendariz	70,593	24.28
Total votes		290,739	100.00
Democratic hold			

=== 2018 ===
Georgia's 4th Congressional District Election (2018)
Party	Candidate	Votes	%
Democratic	Hank Johnson (incumbent)	227,717	78.09
Republican	Joe Profit	61,092	21.01
Total votes		288,809	100.00
Democratic hold			

=== 2020 ===
Georgia's 4th Congressional District Election (2020)
Party	Candidate	Votes	%
Democratic	Hank Johnson (incumbent)	278,906	80.08
Republican	Johsie Cruz Ezammudeen	69,393	19.92
Total votes		348,299	100.00
Democratic hold			

=== 2022 ===
Georgia's 4th Congressional District Election (2022)
Party	Candidate	Votes	%
Democratic	Hank Johnson (incumbent)	216,332	78.49
Republican	Jonathan Chavez	59,302	21.51
Total votes		275,634	100.00
Democratic hold			

=== 2024 ===
Georgia's 4th Congressional District Election (2024)
Party	Candidate	Votes	%
Democratic	Hank Johnson (incumbent)	229,290	75.58
Republican	Eugene Yu	74,071	24.42
Total votes		303,361	100.00
Democratic hold			

== See also ==
- Georgia's congressional districts
- List of United States congressional districts
- Georgia United States House elections, 2006
