= Hugh Buchanan (politician) =

American politician

Member of the U.S. House of Representatives from Georgia's 4th district
- In office March 4, 1881 – March 3, 1885
- Preceded by: Henry Persons
- Succeeded by: Henry R. Harris

Personal details
- Born: September 15, 1823 Argyll, Scotland
- Died: June 11, 1890 (aged 66) Newnan, Georgia, U.S.
- Party: Democratic
- Occupation: Attorney

Military service
- Allegiance: Confederate States
- Branch/service: Confederate States Army
- Rank: Captain
- Unit: Phillips' Georgia Legion
- Battles/wars: American Civil War: Battle of Trevilian Station

Hugh Buchanan (September 15, 1823 – June 11, 1890) was a Scottish-born American Cavalry officer during the American Civil War and U.S. Representative from Georgia.

== Biography ==
Born in Argyll, Scotland, Buchanan immigrated to the United States and settled in Vermont. He attended the public schools of that State. He studied law. He was admitted to the bar in 1845 and commenced practice in Newnan, Georgia, in 1846. He served as member of the State senate in 1855 and 1857. He served as delegate to the Democratic National Conventions in 1856 and 1868. He served as presidential elector on the Democratic ticket of Breckinridge and Lane in 1860. During the Civil War he enlisted in the Confederate States Army in June 1861 and served until 1865. As Captain of Company D of the Phillips Georgia Legion Cavalry Battalion, he was wounded in the chest on June 11, 1864, at the Battle of Trevilian Station.

Buchanan was elected to the Thirty-ninth Congress, but his credentials were not presented to the House as the State had not been readmitted to representation. He was appointed judge of the superior court of the Coweta circuit in August 1872 and served until September 1880. He served as delegate to the State constitutional convention of 1877.

Buchanan was elected as a Democrat to the Forty-seventh and Forty-eighth Congresses (March 4, 1881 – March 3, 1885). He was not a candidate for renomination in 1884. He died in Newnan, Georgia, June 11, 1890, and was interred in Oak Hill Cemetery.

== Sources ==
- United States Congress. "Hugh Buchanan (id: B001003)". Biographical Directory of the United States Congress.

U.S. House of Representatives
Preceded by Joseph Persons	Member of the U.S. House of Representatives from Georgia's 4th congressional district March 4, 1881 – March 3, 1885	Succeeded by Henry R. Harris
