= Henry H. Carlton =

American politician

Henry Hull Carlton
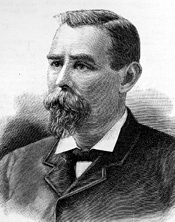
- Henry Hull Carlton, circa 1890

Member of the U.S. House of Representatives from Georgia's 8th congressional district
- In office March 4, 1887 – March 3, 1891
- Preceded by: Seaborn Reese
- Succeeded by: Thomas G. Lawson

Member of the Georgia Senate
- In office 1884-1885

Member of the Georgia House of Representatives
- In office 1873-1877; 1899

Personal details
- Born: May 14, 1835 Athens, Georgia
- Died: October 26, 1905 (aged 70) Athens, Georgia
- Resting place: Oconee Hill Cemetery
- Party: Democratic
- Education: University of Georgia; Jefferson Medical College'=

Military service
- Allegiance: Confederate States of America
- Branch/service: Confederate States Army
- Rank: Major
- Battles/wars: Spanish–American War; American Civil War

Henry Hull Carlton (May 14, 1835 – October 26, 1905) was an American politician, medical doctor, journalist and soldier.

== Biography ==
Carlton was born in Athens, Georgia in 1835. He attended the University of Georgia (UGA) in Athens for two years before attending and graduating from Jefferson Medical College in Philadelphia, Pennsylvania in 1856.

During the American Civil War, Carlton held the ranks of lieutenant, captain, and major of artillery in the Confederate States Army. Following the war, he married Helen C. Newton on 12 November 1867 in Clarke County, Georgia. He maintained a medical practice until 1872. The next year he was elected to the Georgia House of Representatives in the State General Assembly and served in that role until 1877, a year in which he also served as speaker pro tempore of that institution.

Carlton was editor and proprietor of the Athens Banner (Banner Watchman) (currently the Athens Banner Herald) until 1880. During this time, he also studied law, gained admittance to the state bar in 1881 and began a law practice in Athens. Carlton also served as Athens city attorney (1881 and 1882). In 1884, Carlton was elected to the Georgia Senate and served as its president in 1884 and 1885. Running as a Democrat, he was elected to the 50th United States Congress as a Representative and was re-elected to one additional term in that body.

After his federal congressional service, Carlton served an additional term in the Georgia House of Representatives in 1899 before serving in the Spanish–American War as a major in the inspector general's office. He died at his home in Athens on October 26, 1905, and was buried in Oconee Hill Cemetery in that same city.

U.S. House of Representatives
Preceded by Seaborn Reese	Member of the U.S. House of Representatives from Georgia's 8th congressional district March 4, 1887 – March 3, 1891	Succeeded by Thomas G. Lawson
