= Seaborn Reese =

American politician (1846–1907)

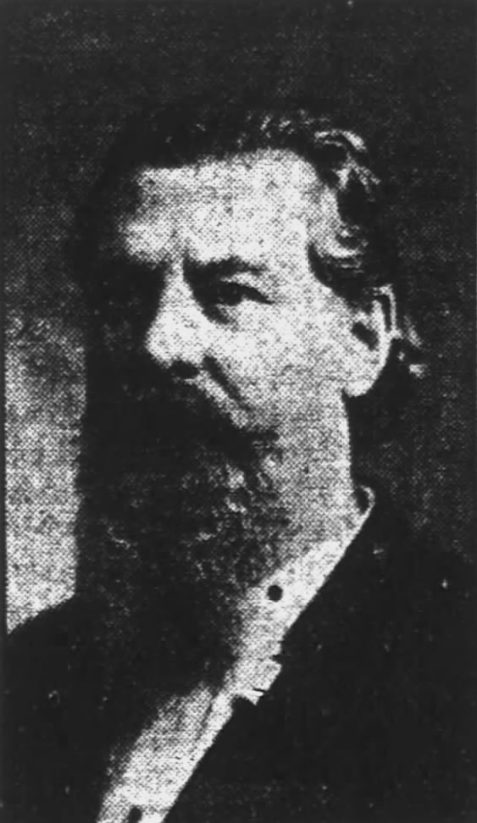

Member of the U.S. House of Representatives from Georgia's 8th district
- In office December 4, 1882 – March 3, 1887
- Preceded by: Alexander Stephens
- Succeeded by: Henry Hull Carlton

Member of the Georgia House of Representatives
- In office 1872–1874

Personal details
- Born: November 28, 1846 Madison, Georgia, U.S.
- Died: March 1, 1907 (aged 60) Sparta, Georgia, U.S.
- Party: Democratic
- Education: University of Georgia

Seaborn Reese (November 28, 1846 – March 1, 1907) was an American politician, jurist and lawyer who served three terms in the United States House of Representatives.

== Personal life ==
Seaborn Reese was born on November 28, 1846, son of Augustus Reese, a judge, in Madison, Georgia. He attended the University of Georgia (UGA) in Athens but left before graduating in his senior year of 1868. He studied law, gained admittance to the state bar in 1871 and began a law practice in Madison. He married Frankie Lane and was a member of a Presbyterian church.

He died suddenly in Sparta, Georgia on March 1, 1907 shortly after speaking with friends, and was buried in that city's Methodist Church Cemetery.

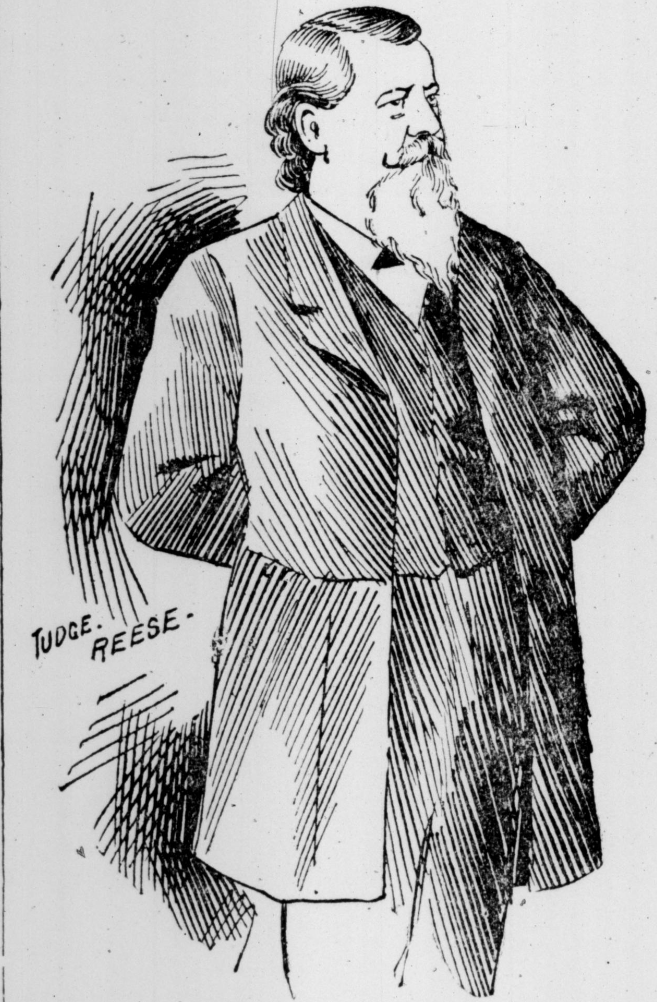
Reese in a court hearing for Yancey Carter's accusation

== Career ==
After moving to Augusta and then Sparta, Reese was elected to the Georgia House of Representatives in the State General Assembly and served in that role from 1872 through 1874. From 1877 to 1880, Reese was the solicitor general of Georgia's northern judicial circuit. In 1882, Alexander Stephens vacated his seat in the House of Representatives to run for governor, and Reese successfully ran as a Democrat to fill the vacated seat for the 47th United States Congress. He had no opposition, with an independent candidate withdrawing. He was reelected to the 48th and 49th Congresses and served from December 4, 1882, until March 3, 1887. He also served as an elector for Winfield Scott Hancock in the 1880 presidential election. He was also elected president of Hancock County's Hancock Fair Association.

After his congressional service, Reese served from 1893 to 1900 as judge of the northern judicial circuit. In 1897, state senator Yancey Carter, leader of the state senate's Populists, accused him and another judge of being drunk on the bench and using profanity in the presence of ladies, for which articles of impeachment were introduced against him, but these charges did not stick. After he retired from the court in 1900 he worked in his own law practice until his death.

U.S. House of Representatives
Preceded by Alexander Stephens	Member of the U.S. House of Representatives from Georgia's 8th congressional district December 4, 1882 – March 3, 1887	Succeeded by Henry Hull Carlton
