= Odessadale, Georgia =

Unincorporated community in Georgia, U.S.

Coordinates: 33°00′57″N 84°48′47″W

Odessadale is an unincorporated community in Meriwether County, Georgia, United States.

== History ==
Variant names were "Odessa" and "Xerxes". A post office called Odessadale was established in 1891, and remained in operation until 1953. The present name is after Odessa Jane Thompson, the daughter of a pioneer citizen.

The Georgia General Assembly incorporated the town as Odessadale in 1905. The town's municipal charter was repealed in 1995.
