= James Mackay (Georgia politician) =

American politician (1919–2004)

James Armstrong Mackay
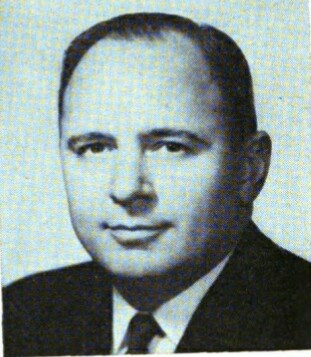
- Official portrait, 1965

Member of the U.S. House of Representatives from Georgia's 4th district
- In office January 3, 1965 – January 3, 1967
- Preceded by: District established (redistricting)
- Succeeded by: Benjamin B. Blackburn

Member of the Georgia House of Representatives DeKalb County
- In office 1951–1953
- In office 1955–1964
- Constituency: DeKalb County

Personal details
- Born: James Armstrong Mackay; June 25, 1919 Fairfield, Alabama, U.S.
- Died: July 2, 2004 (aged 85) Chattanooga, Tennessee, U.S.
- Party: Democratic
- Education: Emory University (AB), (LLB)

James Armstrong Mackay (June 25, 1919 – July 2, 2004) was an American politician and attorney from Georgia. Mackay was first elected to the United States House of Representatives in 1964, representing the 4th district as a Democrat. He served a single term, losing his re-election bid in 1966. He died on July 2, 2004, in Chattanooga, Tennessee.

== Early life and education ==
Mackay was born in Fairfield, Jefferson County, Alabama on June 25, 1919. In 1940 he graduated with an A.B. degree from Emory University in Atlanta, Georgia. He was a member of Kappa Alpha Order. Mackay attended Duke University from 1940 to 1941. After active duty, he returned to Emory where he was president of the student body and received an LL.B. in 1947.

== Military service ==
During World War II, he served as a Coast Guard Reserve officer on the USS Menges, a destroyer escort in the Mediterranean, in 1944, and earned a Bronze Star Medal for rescuing men when his ship was torpedoed.

== Service in U. S. Congress ==
During his tenure, he supported passage of Medicare, and obtained federal funding for the Fernbank Science Center and Planetarium. He was one of only two congressmen from Georgia (the other being Charles L. Weltner of the 5th district) to vote for the Voting Rights Act of 1965.

Mackay was an unsuccessful candidate for reelection to the 90th United States Congress in 1966.

== Life in Decatur, Georgia ==
Mackay practiced law in Decatur, Georgia, with his daughter Kathy and remained active in the Georgia Conservancy. He was a lifelong Methodist and served as an Emory trustee.

Mackay was one of 32 state House members who opposed the Georgia flag change in 1956. "There was only one reason for putting the flag on there. Like the gun rack in the back of a pickup truck, it telegraphs a message," he said decades later. On Feb. 13, 1956, the day Governor Griffin approved the new flag with its Confederate emblem, the state Senate gave final legislative approval to a resolution declaring null and void the U.S. Supreme Court's decision in Brown vs. Board of Education.

Emory University conferred an Honorary Doctorate Degree on Mackay at its Sesquicentennial Convocation December 10, 1986. The honors included the Georgia Conservancy's "Distinguished Conservationist Award," the DeKalb Historical Society's "History Maker Award," the 1979 Rock Howard Award, and the 1984 "Mr. DeKalb" Award.

== Founder of the Georgia Conservancy ==
Georgia Conservancy president John Sibley remarked after Mackay's passing, "He was a larger-than-life person and an environmentalist who raised the level of the environmental movement in Georgia all by himself." Mackay recognized that public concern for the environment, stemming from the 1962 publication of Rachel Carson's Silent Spring, needed to take root in Georgia. In January 1967, he assembled some of his colleagues to discuss forming the group that today is known as one of the leading environmental organizations in the nation.

Under Mackay's leadership, the Conservancy understood that seeing what was happening in Georgia is the best way to learn about places and issues, that being active rather than reactive leads to success, and that Georgia's economy and ecology are inseparable. The Georgia Conservancy honored Jamie with its Distinguished Conservationist award in 2001. Sweetwater Creek, Panola Mountain, the Okefenokee Swamp, Chattooga River, Cumberland Island, and Fernbank are only a few of his legacies.

== Death and legacy ==
Mackay died on July 2, 2004, one week after his 85th birthday, at Lookout Mountain, Tennessee, where he maintained a boat cleat on his deck a thousand feet above the floor of Lookout Valley and invited others to join his Society of Noah.

His first wife, Mary Caroline Lee Mackay, and his son, James Edward Mackay, predeceased him. He was survived by his wife Sara Lee Mackay, and his daughter Kathleen Mackay, of Rising Fawn, Georgia, a former member of the DeKalb Bar Association. Mackay's remains were cremated.

U.S. House of Representatives
Preceded by John J. Flynt, Jr.	Member of the U.S. House of Representatives from Georgia's 4th congressional district January 3, 1965 – January 3, 1967	Succeeded by Benjamin B. Blackburn
Georgia House of Representatives
Preceded by Pierre Howard; H.O. Hubert, Jr.	Member of the Georgia House of Representatives for DeKalb County; 1951–1953; With: Richard Bell; William Hugh McWhorter	Succeeded by Guy Rutland, Jr. Aubrey Turner
Preceded by Aubrey Turner	Member of the Georgia House of Representatives for DeKalb County; 1955–1964; With: William Hugh McWhorter (1955–1961); Guy Rutland, Jr. (1955–1964); Pierre Howard (1961–1963); J. Robin Harris (1963–1964)	Succeeded by Jim Bowen; Robert Farrar
