= Thomas G. Lawson =

American politician

Thomas Graves Lawson
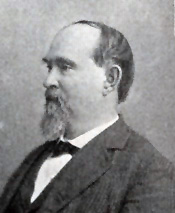

Member of the U.S. House of Representatives from Georgia's 8th district
- In office March 4, 1891 – March 3, 1897
- Preceded by: Henry H. Carlton
- Succeeded by: William M. Howard

Personal details
- Born: May 2, 1835 Eatonton, Georgia
- Died: April 16, 1912 (aged 76) Eatonton, Georgia
- Resting place: Pine Grove Cemetery; Eatonton, Georgia
- Party: Democratic
- Spouse: Mary Frances Reid (m. 1860)
- Education: Mercer University
- Occupation: Lawyer, politician

Military service
- Allegiance: Confederate States of America
- Branch/service: Confederate States Army
- Battles/wars: American Civil War

Thomas Graves Lawson (May 2, 1835 – April 16, 1912) was a Congressional Representative from Georgia.

== Early life ==
Born near Eatonton, Georgia, Lawson attended private schools and graduated from Mercer University, Macon, Georgia, in 1855. He studied law.

He married Mary Frances Reid (1835-1915) in Eatonton in November 1860.

== Career ==
Lawson was admitted to the bar in 1857 and commenced practice in Eatonton, Georgia. During the Civil War he served two years in the Confederate States Army. He served in the Georgia House of Representatives 1861-1866, 1889, and 1890. Lawson served as a delegate to the State Constitutional Convention in 1877. He served on the board of trustees of Mercer University and the Eatonton Male and Female Academy. Lawson served as judge of the Superior Courts of Ocmulgee circuit from 1879-1887. He engaged in farming near Eatonton from 1888 to 1891.

Lawson was elected as a Democrat to the Fifty-second, Fifty-third, and Fifty-fourth Congresses serving from March 4, 1891 – March 3, 1897. He was an unsuccessful candidate for renomination in 1896, and resumed agricultural pursuits in Putnam County, Georgia.

== Death ==
Lawson died in Eatonton, Georgia, April 16, 1912. He was interred in Pine Grove Cemetery.

== Sources ==
- United States Congress. "Thomas G. Lawson (id: L000146)". Biographical Directory of the United States Congress.

U.S. House of Representatives
Preceded by Henry H. Carlton	Member of the U.S. House of Representatives from Georgia's 8th congressional district March 4, 1891 – March 3, 1897	Succeeded by William M. Howard
