= Samuel F. Gove =

American politician

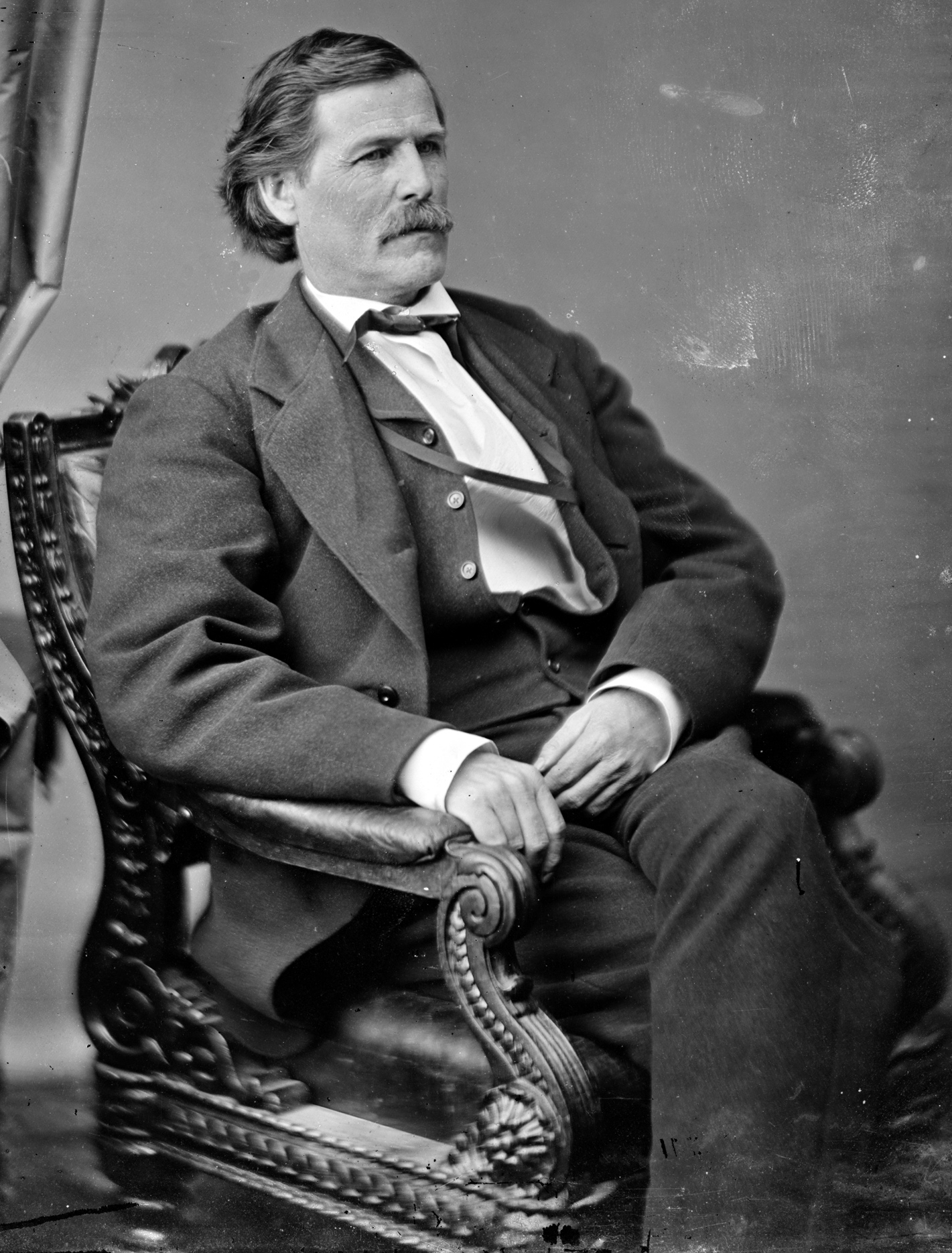

Member of the U.S. House of Representatives from Georgia's 4th district
- In office June 25, 1868 – March 3, 1869
- Preceded by: Office suspended due to the American Civil War
- Succeeded by: Jefferson F. Long

Personal details
- Born: March 9, 1822 Weymouth, Massachusetts
- Died: December 3, 1900 (aged 78) St. Augustine, Florida
- Party: Republican

Samuel Francis Gove (March 9, 1822 – December 3, 1900) was a U.S. representative from Georgia.

Gove was born in Weymouth, Massachusetts, and attended the common schools there. He moved to Georgia in 1835 with his parents, who settled in Twiggs County. He engaged in mercantile and agricultural pursuits. He was also a missionary.

Upon the readmission of the State of Georgia to the Union in the Reconstruction Era, he won a narrow election as a Republican to the 40th Congress and served from June 25, 1868, to March 3, 1869. He presented credentials as a member-elect to the 41st Congress, but along with other Georgia representatives, he was dismissed by Congress after the Georgia state legislature failed to ratify the Fifteenth Amendment to the U.S. Constitution on the grounds he had not been re-elected to the new Congress. As they were unsure when their representatives would be seated, Georgia had decided that the election winners of April 1868 would fill the seats in the 40th Congress and the 41st Congress. The House ruled that one could not serve in two legislatures based on the results of one election. Military rule resumed throughout Georgia in December 1869 and the state had no representatives in the House until just before the end of the 41st Congress when Jefferson F. Long served from January 16 to March 3, 1871.

Gove was a candidate for Congress again in 1874 and 1876, but lost both races.

He was ordained as a Baptist minister in 1877 and was a traveling missionary from 1879 until his death in St. Augustine, Florida, December 3, 1900. He was interred in Rose Hill Cemetery, Macon, Georgia.

U.S. House of Representatives
| Preceded by American Civil War | Member of the U.S. House of Representatives from Georgia's 4th congressional district June 25, 1868 – March 3, 1869 | Succeeded by Jefferson F. Long |
