= Erasmus W. Beck =

American politician (1833–1898)

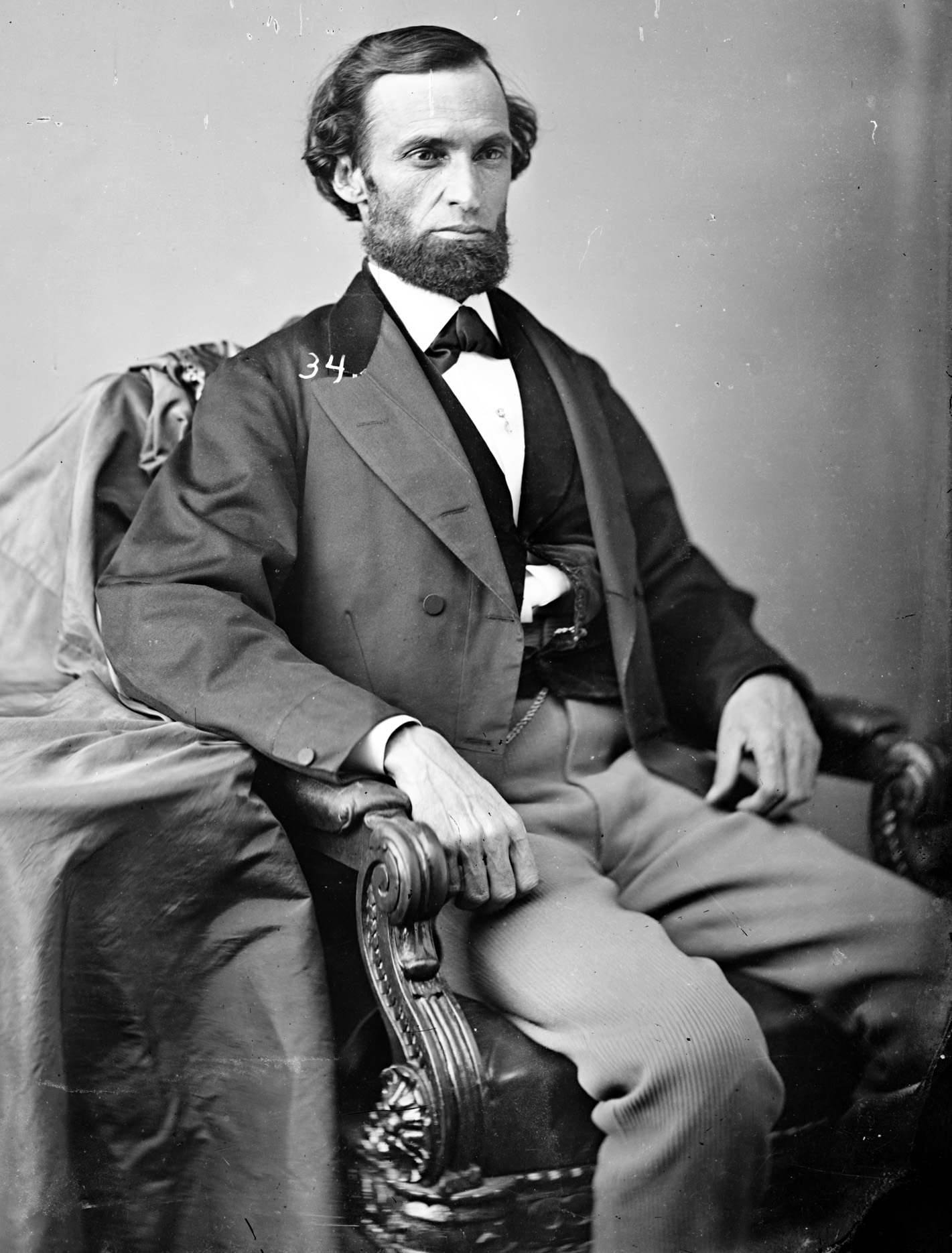
- Beck, 1860–1875

Member of the U.S. House of Representatives from Georgia's 4th district
- In office December 2, 1872 – March 3, 1873
- Preceded by: Thomas J. Speer
- Succeeded by: Henry R. Harris

Personal details
- Born: Erasmus William Beck; October 21, 1833 McDonough, Georgia
- Died: July 22, 1898 (aged 64) Griffin, Georgia
- Party: Democratic
- Education: Mercer University

Erasmus Williams Beck (October 21, 1833 – July 22, 1898) was a slave owner and U.S. representative from Georgia.

== Life ==
Born in McDonough, Henry County, Georgia, he attended the local schools of his native county, a private school, and Mercer University, Macon, Georgia, for two years. After returning to McDonough in 1855 due to ill health, he began the study of law. The following year, he relocated to Griffin, Georgia, where he continued his law studies. Admitted to the bar in 1856, he began to practice law in Griffin, Georgia.

Enrolled for a short period in the Confederate States Army during the Civil War, he was discharged due to ill health.

During the war, he was appointed solicitor general of the Flint circuit.

Beck was elected as a Democrat to the Forty-second Congress to fill the vacancy caused by the death of Thomas J. Speer and served from December 2, 1872, to March 3, 1873. He was not a candidate for renomination in 1872. He resumed the practice of his profession at Griffin, Georgia. He served as judge of the city court of Griffin from 1890 until his death in that city on July 22, 1898. He was interred in Oak Hill Cemetery.

U.S. House of Representatives
Preceded by Thomas J. Speer	Member of the U.S. House of Representatives from Georgia's 4th congressional district December 2, 1872 – March 3, 1873	Succeeded by Henry R. Harris
