= Jefferson F. Long =

American politician (1836–1901)

Jefferson Franklin Long
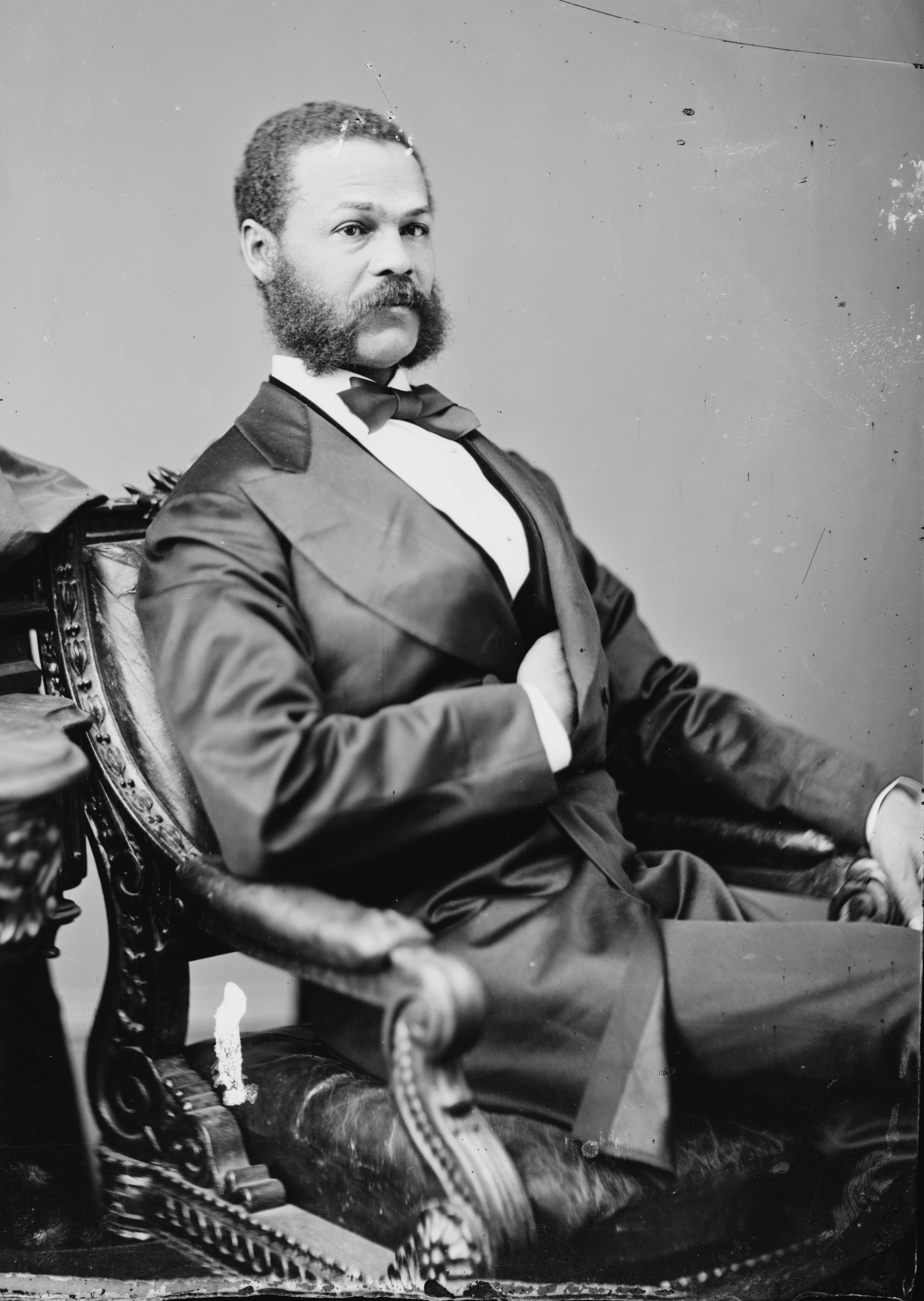

Member of the U.S. House of Representatives from Georgia's 4th district
- In office January 16, 1871 – March 3, 1871
- Preceded by: Samuel F. Gove
- Succeeded by: Thomas J. Speer

Personal details
- Born: March 3, 1836 Knoxville, Georgia
- Died: February 4, 1901 (aged 64) Macon, Georgia
- Cause of death: Influenza
- Party: Republican
- Profession: Tailor

Jefferson Franklin Long (March 3, 1836 – February 4, 1901) was a U.S. congressman from Georgia. He was the second African American sworn into the U.S. House of Representatives and the first African-American congressman from Georgia. Long was the first African-American representative to speak on the floor of the U.S. House, opposing the Amnesty Bill that exempted former Confederates serving in the House from swearing allegiance to the Constitution. He remained the only African American to represent Georgia until Andrew Young was elected in 1972.

== Biography ==
Long was born into slavery to an enslaved black mother and a white father near the city of Knoxville in Crawford County, Georgia, on March 3, 1836. He taught himself to read and write, an illegal act for slaves, while setting type for the newspaper in Macon, Georgia. By 1860, Long had married Lucinda Carhart and had started a family. By the end of the American Civil War, an emancipated Long had become a successful merchant tailor in Macon, Georgia.

Long had established himself as a prominent member of the Republican Party in 1867 and was elected in 1870 as a Republican to the Forty-first Congress to serve a term from January 16 to March 3, 1871. Georgia had no congressional representation from March 1869 to December 1870 due to the state's failure to ratify the Fifteenth Amendment. Long is best known for his speech on the floor of the House of Representatives in opposition to a measure to provide amnesty to former Confederates:

Do we, then, really propose here today, when the country is not ready for it, when those disloyal people still hate this government, when loyal men dare not carry the ‘stars and stripes’ through our streets, for if they do they will be turned out of employment, to relieve from political disability the very men who have committed these Kuklux outrages? I think that I am doing my duty to my constituents and my duty to my country when I vote against any such proposition... Mr. Speaker, I propose, as a man raised as a slave, my mother a slave before me, and my ancestry slaves as far back as I can trace them... If this House removes the disabilities of disloyal men by modifying the test-oath, I venture to prophesy you will again have trouble from the very same men who gave you trouble before.

He was not a candidate for re-election in 1870 due to anti-Reconstruction efforts by the white-majority Georgia GOP, but remained active in politics and served as a delegate to the Republican National Convention from 1872 to 1880.

After his congressional term, Long returned to his tailoring business in Macon, which he ran with one of his sons.

Long died from influenza on February 4, 1901, and was interred at Linwood Cemetery in Macon.

== See also ==
- List of African-American United States representatives

== Bibliography ==
- Matthews, John M. "Jefferson Franklin Long: The Public Career of Georgia's First Black Congressman." Phylon 42 (June 1981): 145–56.
- Logan, Rayford W. "Long, Jefferson Franklin." In Dictionary of American Negro Biography, edited by Rayford W. Logan and Michael R. Winston, pp. 405. New York: W.W. Norton and Co., 1982.
- Hardwick, Grace. "Jefferson Franklin Long (1836-1901)." New Georgia Encyclopedia. 5 January 2017. Web. 28 March 2018.
- United States Congress. "Jefferson F. Long (id: L000419)". Biographical Directory of the United States Congress.

U.S. House of Representatives
| Preceded by Samuel Francis Gove | Member of the U.S. House of Representatives from Georgia's 4th congressional district December 22, 1870 – March 3, 1871 | Succeeded by Thomas J. Speer |
