= Myrtle Hill Cemetery =

Cemetery in Georgia, US

- U.S. National Register of Historic Places
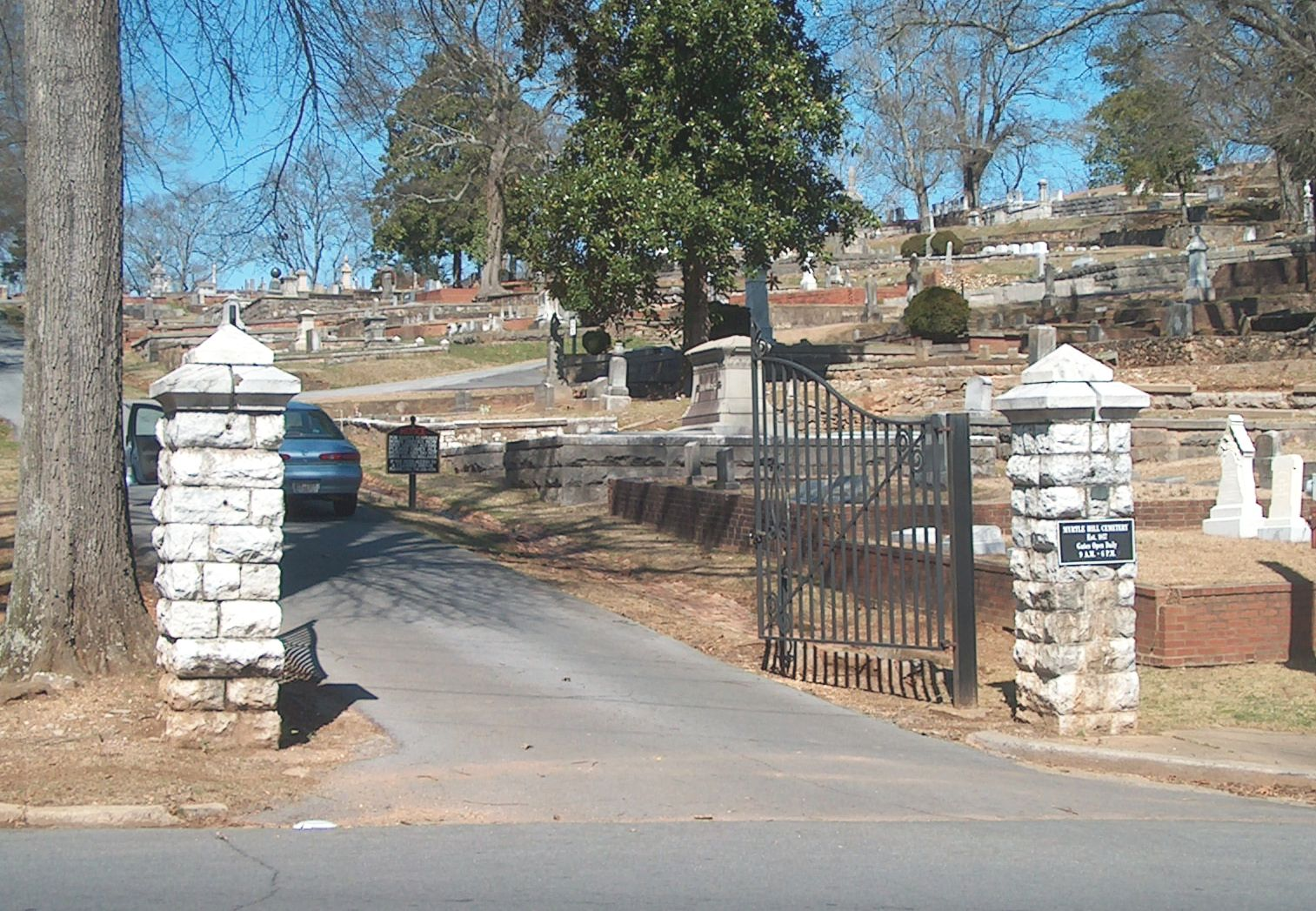
- Main gates

- Location within Georgia Location within the United States
- Location: South Broad and Myrtle Sts. Rome, Georgia
- Coordinates: 34°15′6.84″N 85°10′45.12″W
- Built: 1857
- Architect: Cunningham M. Pennington
- NRHP reference No.: 83000196
- Added to NRHP: September 1, 1983

Myrtle Hill Cemetery is the second-oldest cemetery in the city of Rome, Georgia. The cemetery is at the confluence of the Etowah River and Oostanaula River and to the south of downtown Rome across the South Broad Street bridge.

== Geography ==
Three of Rome's seven hills were chosen as burial grounds - Lumpkin Hill, Myrtle Hill, and Mount Aventine because of the flooding of Rome's three rivers - Etowah, Oostanaula and Coosa. Myrtle Hill was named for its Vinca minor (trailing myrtle) on the hill. The cemetery covers 32 acres (130,000 m^{2}) on six terraces and is listed in the National Register of Historic Places.

Myrtle Hill cemetery is the final resting place of more than 20,000 people including doctors, politicians, football heroes, soldiers (including America's Known Soldier), a First Lady of the United States, and Rome's founders.

"Where Romans Rest" is an annual tour of Myrtle Hill Cemetery, given by the Greater Rome Convention & Visitors Bureau.

== History ==
=== Battle of Hightower ===
Before becoming a cemetery, the hill gained notability as an 18th-century battle site. In September 1793, General John Sevier, in command of 800 men, came to the area on an unauthorized mission. Sevier was pursuing 1,000 Cherokees who had scalped and killed thirteen settlers at Cavett's Station, near Knoxville. The pursuit ended in Georgia, when Sevier caught up with the Cherokee at the village of what he called Hightower (Etowah, or Itawayi), which is near the present-day site of Cartersville, Georgia. The Cherokee created a defensive position on Myrtle Hill and used a guard to try to prevent Sevier from fording the rivers.

Sevier left a written account of the battle, in which he described an attempt to cross the Etowah River about a mile south of Myrtle Hill, drawing the Cherokee defenders out of their prepared positions, then galloping back to Myrtle Hill to cross there. The Cherokee rushed back to contest the crossing of the Etowah, but failed. When the Cherokee leader, Kingfisher, was killed, the remaining warriors fled, and Sevier burned the village.

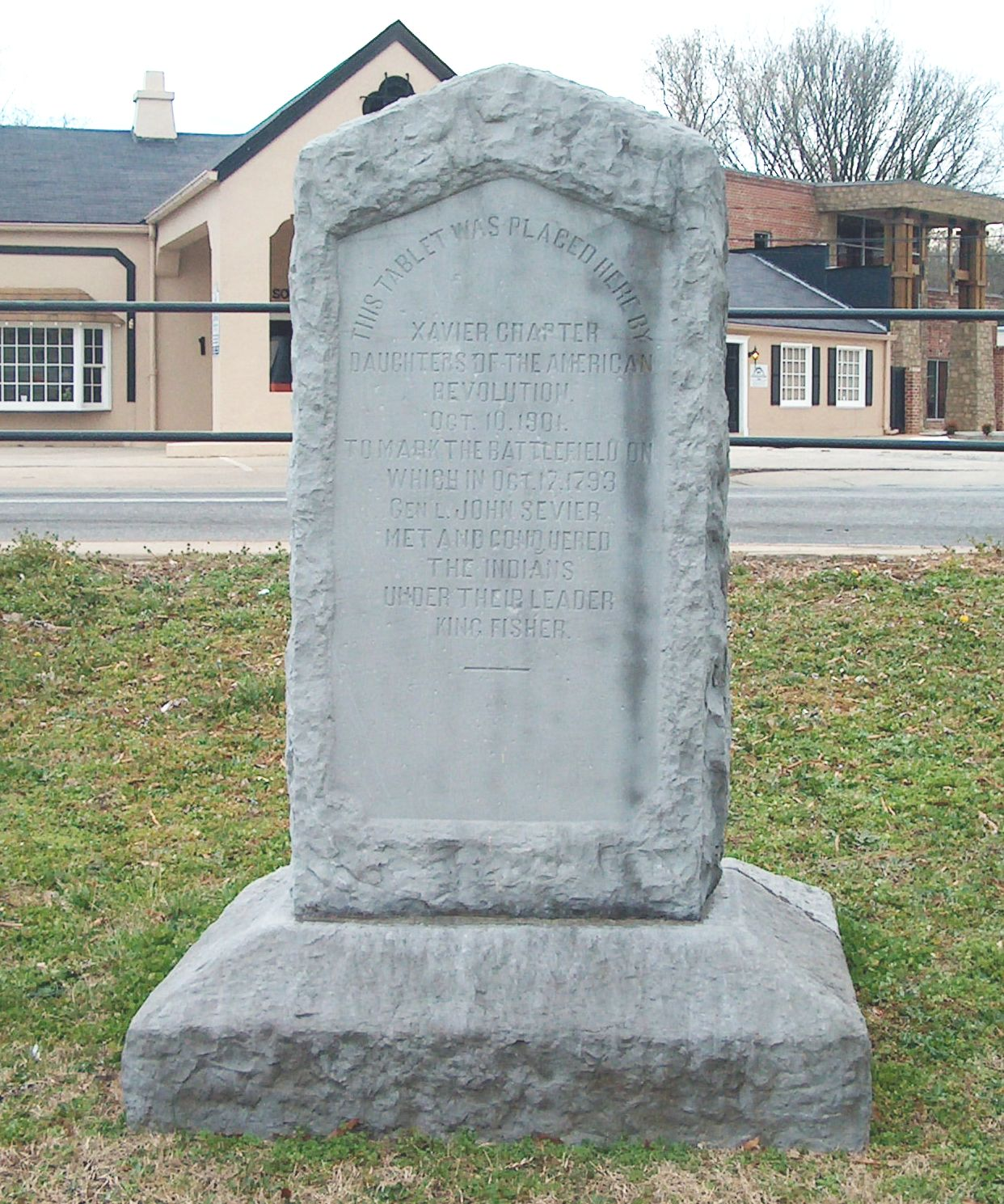
Sevier Monument for Battle of Hightower

Evidence of the battle was found in the form of Cherokee bones and relics in the crevasses of the hill. In 1901, the Xavier chapter of the Daughters of the American Revolution erected a stone monument to Sevier which describes the battle to honor Sevier and the battle. The monument is located between Myrtle Hill Cemetery and the Etowah River by the South Broad Street bridge.

=== Cemetery named Myrtle Hill ===
After the Battle of Hightower, the hill was largely undisturbed until white settlers came to western Georgia in search of gold. The Dahlonega, Georgia gold discovery (gold rush) of 1829 brought prospectors and settlers into the area of present-day Rome. The Indian Removal, or Trail of Tears, which took place between 1830 and 1838, forced the Cherokee to abandon their holdings in the area. The former Cherokee territory was then allotted to white settlers. The city of Rome, founded in 1834 by Colonel Daniel R. Mitchell, Colonel Zachariah Hargrove, Major Phillip Hemphill, Colonel William Smith, and John Lumpkin, established Oak Hill (opened in 1837) as Rome's first cemetery. Thirteen years later, when Oak Hill Cemetery was nearly out of lots, the need for a second cemetery became apparent.

In 1850, after considering several properties, Colonel Thomas A. Alexander and Daniel S. Printup chose a hill near the rivers. The hill was originally owned by Colonel Alfred Shorter and Cunningham Pennington, a civil engineer. Rome Female College was later renamed Shorter University in honor of the Colonel and his wife Martha. Pennington designed the plan for the interments on six levels of the steep terrain as a 19th-century picturesque rural cemetery. Roads circle the hill and combine with the necessary terracing to create a layered, "wedding cake" look. The new cemetery was opened in 1857 as Myrtle Hill Cemetery. "Myrtle" was chosen because of the myrtle (vinca minor) or "Flower of Death" that grew wild over the hill. The original Cemetery of 11 acres (45,000 m^{2}) was at the top of the hill. One of the first graves was of John Billups who died in 1857.

=== Fort Stovall ===
On July 14, 1863, the citizens of Rome allocated $3,000 to construct three earthen forts to defend Rome from the Union Army during the American Civil War. The forts were completed in October 1863, as Confederate soldiers began to take up duties in the new fortifications. As anticipated, Union raiders made forays into the area. Their focus was to cripple the Confederate war machine by destroying the Noble Foundry, located in the city on the Etowah River across from the cemetery. One of the forts, constructed on the crest of Myrtle Hill, was named Fort Stovall in honor of fallen Confederate soldier, George Stovall. Other forts, Fort Attaway (named for Thomas Attaway) and Fort Norton (named for Charles Norton), were opposite the location of Fort Stovall. It was described as a bracket-shaped linear earthwork near the top of Myrtle Hill as shown on the map. Its line faced northwest, defending the western approach to Rome as well as the Coosa River. It was made with several faces, which provided maximum coverage along its front. The zigzag shape permitted defenders to direct enfilading (from the side) fire on any men who approached the line.

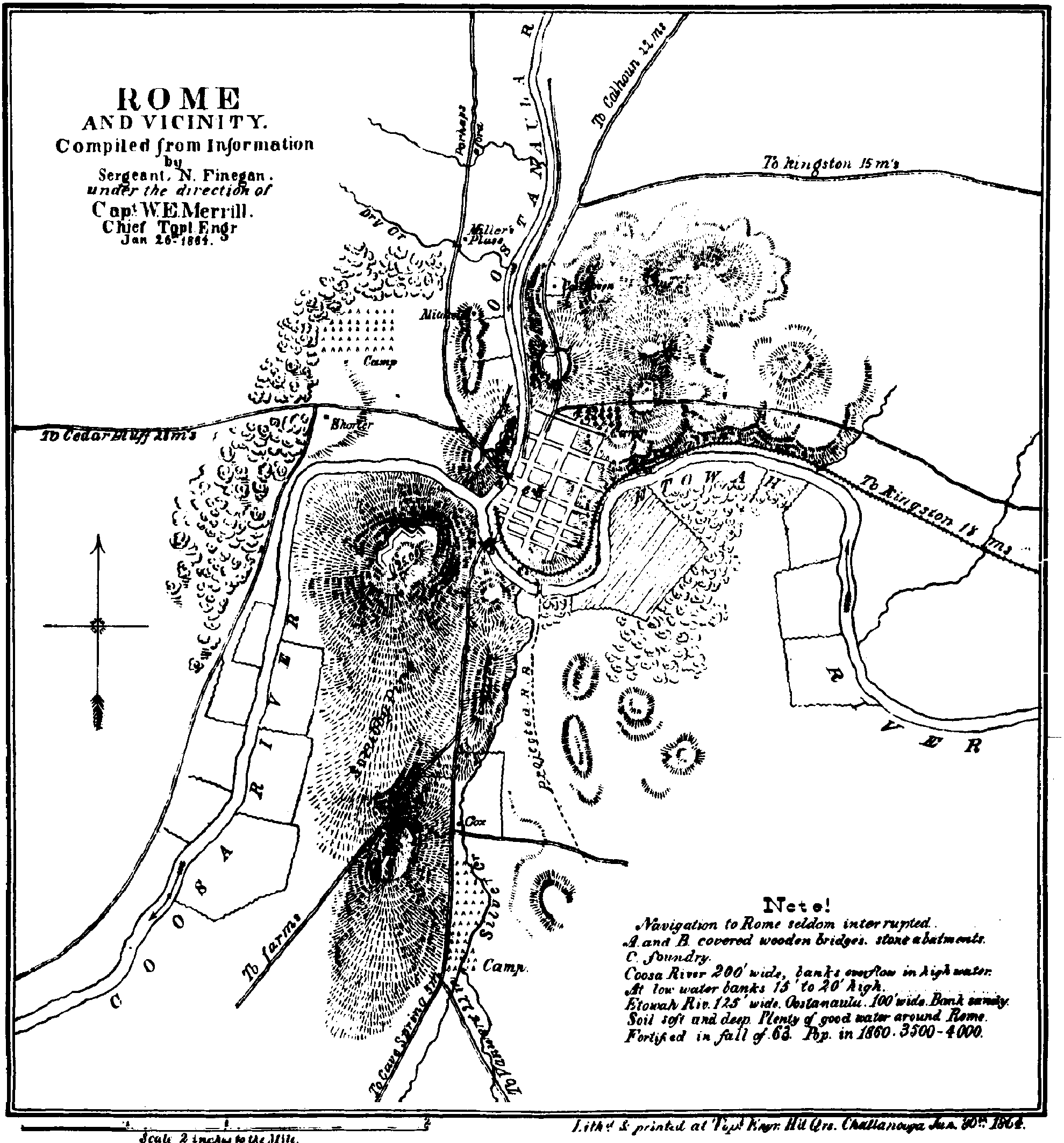
The map of Fort Stovall

The exact location of the earthworks of Fort Stovall is impossible to determine from a Civil War era "map", and no evidence of it can be seen in the cemetery. Defensive lines constructed on a hill were typically built below the very top of the hill to prevent the occupants of the line from being silhouetted against the sky and giving the enemy a better target. It also gave the soldiers a clearer line of sight down the slope of the hill. The extensive terracing necessary for burials at Myrtle Hill has eliminated any evidence of Fort Stovall on the surface. It is possible, although unlikely, that remnants of the earthworks survive as subsurface features. While it is clear that subsequent earth-moving activities at Myrtle Hill affected the Civil War earthworks, it is also likely the Civil War action resulted in damage to the cemetery. The top of the monument on Billups' grave, which dates to 1857, is believed to have been shot off by a musket ball during the war, but no other specific mention is made of damage to the graves. However, because of the excellent vantage point provided by the hill, there was likely considerable activity at the fort, as a point of origin for Confederate scouting and raiding parties. While the exact location of Fort Stovall is unclear, three sites are considered likely; the crest of the hill, where a Confederate soldier statue now stands, the Axson family homesite, or the hillside nearest the Etowah river.

On May 17, 1864, Confederate units defended Rome, including Fort Stovall, when Union General Jefferson C. Davis, in command of the 2nd Division of Palmer's 14th Army Corps, Army of the Cumberland, approached down the west side of the Oostanaula and took up a position opposite Rome and engaged with the Confederate pickets. On reaching this position, Davis received an order to return to the 14th Corps, but as he was already engaged with Confederates and suspected a weak defense, he determined to stay on and capture Rome. Davis' considerable force was held at bay overnight by a small garrison assisted by three brigades of Polk's Corps on their way from Mississippi to reinforce General Albert Sidney Johnston. Fort Stovall was occupied during this brief standoff, but the main point of Confederate artillery was on Shorter Hill on the west side of the Oostanaula. The next day, when the Union forces moved to capture Rome, the Confederates had retreated. After the Confederates retreated and left Rome, Union forces likely used the fort during their occupation of Rome.

=== Postbellum Myrtle Hill Cemetery ===
The cemetery was used for fallen soldiers from several Civil War battles. A number of antebellum burials have been noted, and numerous interments had been made in the Confederate Cemetery section by 1863. Other graves were added during the Atlanta campaign following the death of soldiers in Rome's hospitals. After 1872, more graves were added as some important people with roles in the founding of Rome were buried there. Daniel R. Mitchell (died 1876), one of the founders of Rome, Daniel S. Printup (died 1887), one of the men who selected this site of the cemetery, John H. Underwood (died 1888), a United States Representative before the Civil War, a two-term superior court judge, and lawyer in Rome, Colonel Alfred Shorter (died 1882), the former owner of the cemetery and namesake of Shorter University, Nathan Henry Bass Sr. (died 1890), Civil War Confederate Congressman, Augustus Romaldus Wright (died 1891) who served in U.S. Congress with Abraham Lincoln, Dr. Robert Battey (died 1895), who performed the first ovarian operation, Homer V. M. Miller (died 1896), 1886 U.S. Senate in 1886, first Democrat from Georgia, Richard Vonalbade Gammon (died 1897), the University of Georgia football player who died of the injuries he received in the Georgia-Virginia football game, and Rosalind Gammon (died 1904), Gammon's mother who saved a football from being illegal in the state of Georgia.

The Confederate Soldier statue on top of Myrtle Hill is known as "The Monument to the Confederate Dead of Rome and Floyd County in the Civil War" and was placed by the local chapter of the Ladies' Memorial Association in 1869. The Ladies Memorial Association raised the $6,000 for the statue to be made. This was difficult during Reconstruction and the 1870 financial panics caused a delay in the placing of the statue; however, the statue's plan was complete in 1887 as the statue was dedicated. The statue still stands on top of the hill, "Crown Point". In 1874, Hines M. Smith made a new survey of the cemetery which defined what is called the Old Original cemetery. New numbers were assigned to the lots at that time. Some deeds after 1874 make reference to the old number as well as the new one. Boundaries of the Old Original cemetery are based on a copy of the Smith survey updated to 1901. Some of the lots on this map, especially in the western part of the cemetery, may have been added between 1874 and 1901. The 1901 survey indicates that the original road pattern within the cemetery was nearly identical to its configuration today. A short section of road in the south western part of the Old Original section was closed by 1901. Also, it is evident that in the western part of the Old Original cemetery, some of the original walkways between the lots were being filled in by that date. By the end of the 19th century, the popularity of lots had been sold out to people who purchased the additions for their plans. The additions had been created and completed by Branham about 1899 on the steep bluff facing the rivers on the north side of the Old Original cemetery, Terraces A-D were added from 1908 to 1928 to near Branham's, the New Front in around 1909, The triangle "Memorial Addition" at the corner of streets and the south boundary of the Old Original cemetery in 1923 for Charles Graves, "America's Known Soldier" "the designated representative of all the Known Dead of the Great War 1917-1918" by President Warren Harding and the Congressional Record, Glover Vault, the New Front Terrace, and the Greystone in 1938. The lots also contains the Freedman (African-American) section set aside when the cemetery was segregated. One of the African Americans buried at Myrtle Hill in 1915 was Tom McClintock, who had worked as a Myrtle Hill Cemetery gravedigger for 42 years.

=== 2017 Confederate monument vandalism ===
In December 2017, the Rome Confederate Monument atop Myrtle Hill was vandalized. The monument was initially an urn and was erected 1887 by the "Women of Rome" to honor the Confederate veterans of Rome. The urn was replaced by a statue of a soldier in 1909. In 2017, a vandal or vandals knocked off its hands and the rifle, along with bashing in its face. The vandal or vandals responsible were never apprehended.

== Confederate cemetery ==
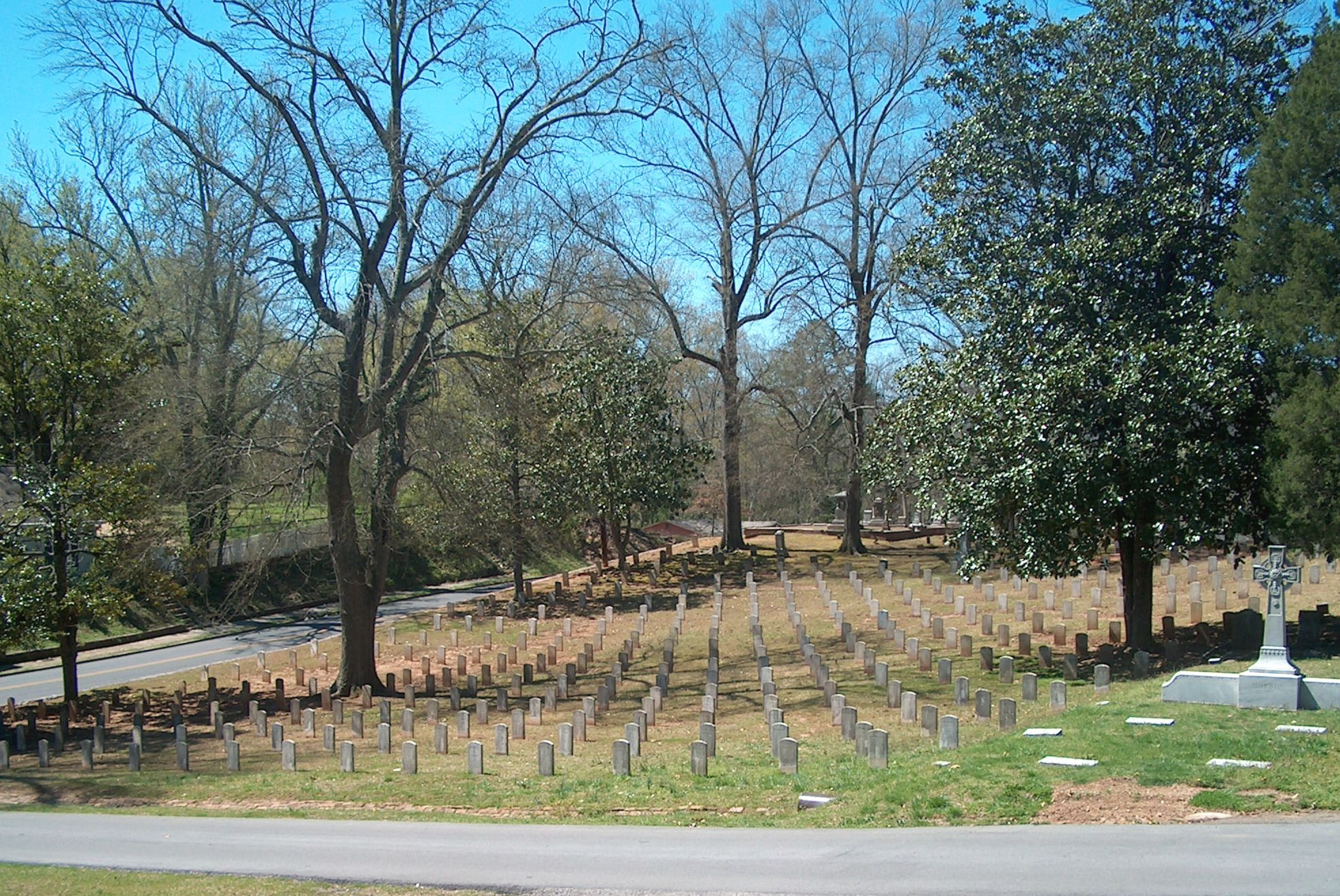
Confederate Cemetery

This section contains over 377 Confederate and Union soldiers including 85 Unknown Union and/or Confederate Soldiers [Ref: A History of Rome and Floyd County, Battey, pp. 622 and see also Rome and Floyd County: An Illustrated History, Sesquicentennial Edition, 1985, pp 39. The first reference states that the Unknown graves are Confederate, while the second source states that the unknown graves are Union. More definitive information is needed for clarification]. They lost their lives in the battles of the American Civil War from Rome and other places. Dr. Samuel H. Stout, the physician in charge of all the hospitals that served the Army of Tennessee, ordered that all permanently disabled patients be sent to Rome. Many are buried in this section. The buildings and churches that were used as hospitals for the fallen soldiers were spared from General William Sherman's November 1864 order of burning buildings on Broad Street. Most are still standing and are on the National Register of Historic Places. The section's graves were marked with painted wooden markers between 1863 and 1900. Sometime after 1900, their wooden markers were replaced with the present stone markers that still exist. The section is called the Confederate Section of the Cemetery, but is not limited to just soldiers from the Civil War. A few graves are those of soldiers from subsequent wars; and one woman, buried at the feet of her husband.

== Veteran's Plaza ==
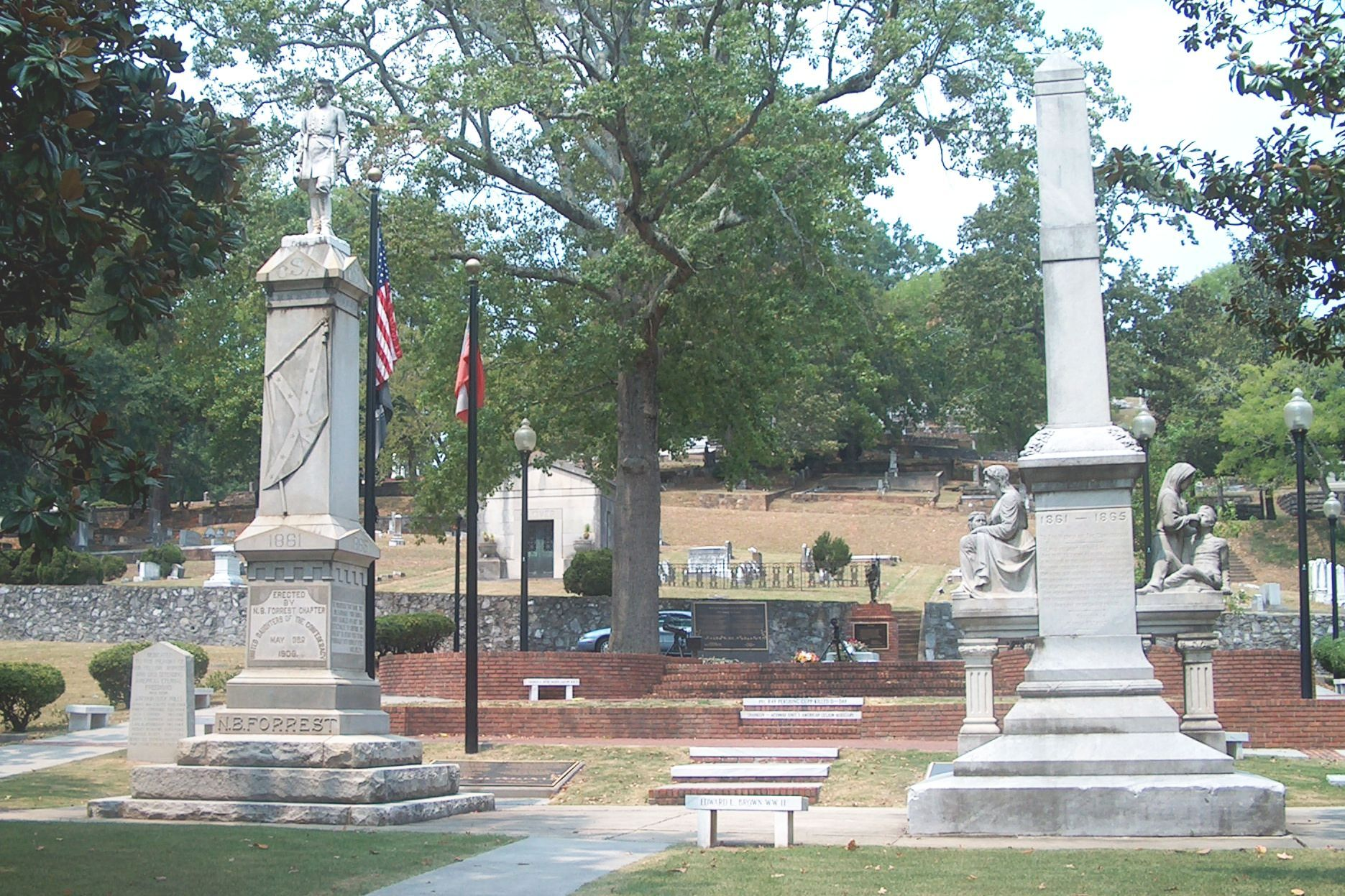
Veteran's Plaza (Confederate Park on the front)

Veteran's Plaza is a bricked site located at the corner of South Broad Street and Myrtle Street. The centerpiece of the plaza is the grave of America's Known Soldier, Charles Graves, 1904 water-cooled automatic machine guns around Graves' grave, and bronze replica of a World War doughboy enhances this site. Before Veteran's Plaza was a bricked site, it was just a grassy field with Graves' grave, the three maxim guns that were in the different positions, and shrines as memorials from the 1930s to the present to fallen soldiers who were involved with other wars. In the beginning of the year 2000, Many of the bricks were placed by a brick mason named Leroy Minter. The plaza has more than 3,000 bricks engraved with the names and branch of service, to honor and memorialize military veterans and civilians for their services to America in war or peace throughout all of American history.

=== Confederate monuments ===
Two notable Confederate monuments stand at the side corners of Veterans Plaza. They are the Nathan Bedford Forrest Monument and the Women of the Confederacy Monument. These monuments were moved in 1952 from their original places on Broad Street at Second Avenue because they had become a traffic hazard. General Forrest's Monument was dedicated to honor him for saving Rome from Colonel Abel Streight and his mule-equipped cavalry on their mission to capture Rome. Colonel Streight who was coming from Alabama on May 3, 1863 was defeated by General Forrest with a small group of confederates serving with him. General Forrest had 425 men and Colonel Streight had 1,000 but Streight surrendered as his raid was caught (see Rome, Georgia#Civil war period). His monument was erected by the United Daughters of the Confederacy in 1909. Forrest's monument was rededicated by the Emma Sansom Chapter of the United Daughters of the Confederacy in a ceremony on Saturday, April 18, 2009 for the 100th anniversary of the first dedication of his monument. The Women of the Confederacy Monument honors Confederate women who served as nurses in Rome to care for Confederate and Union soldiers during the Civil War and mothers and wives who waited while their men fought. Woodrow Wilson wrote the inscription on the monument. This monument is believed to be the first monument in the world to honor the role of women in war.

=== Tomb of the Known Soldier ===
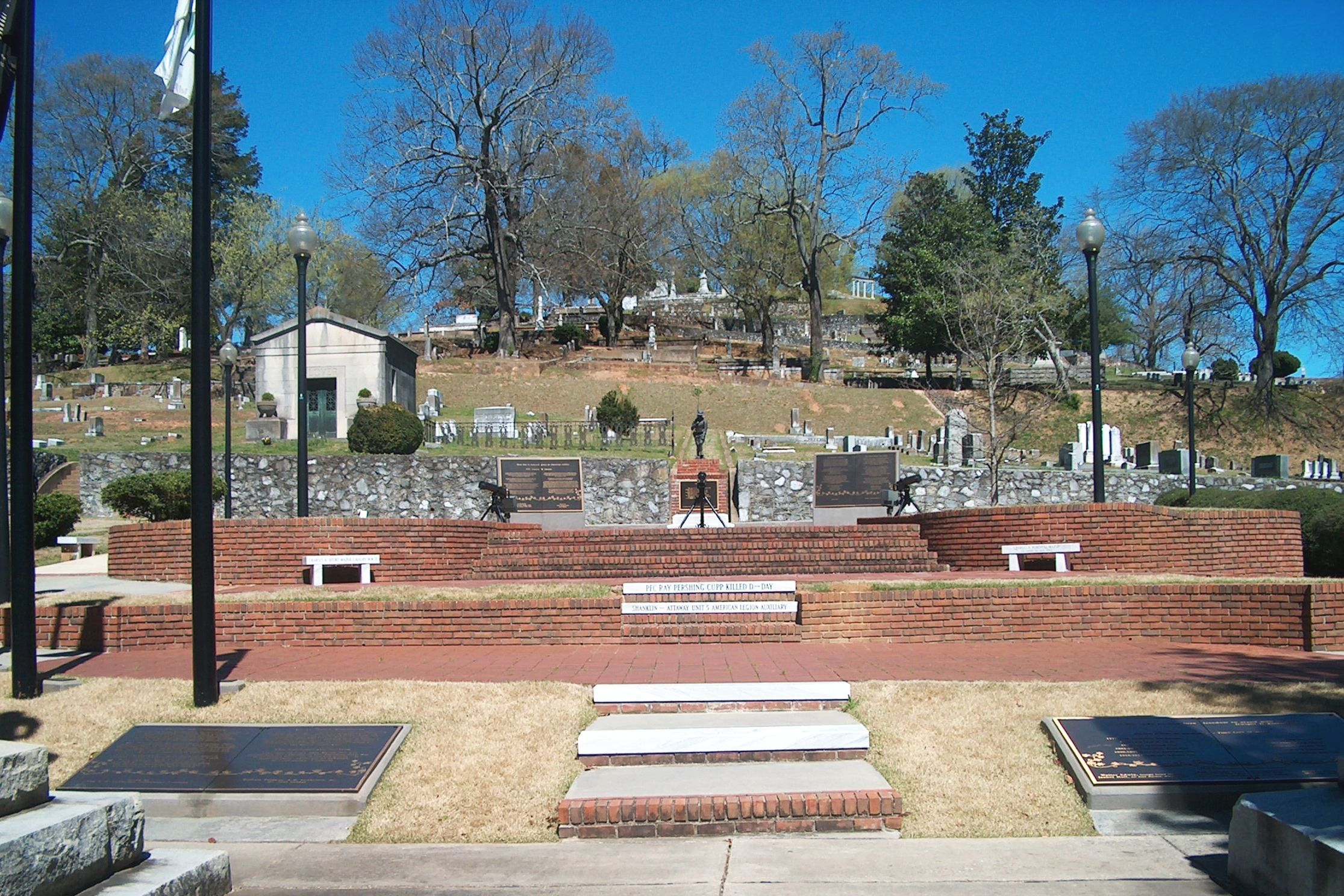
Pvt. Charles Graves' grave is in the middle of the plaza with maxim guns in back

The Tomb of the Known Soldier is the grave of Private Charles W. Graves (1893–1918). Private Graves was an infantryman in the American Expeditionary Force who fought in World War I. On October 5, 1918, Private Graves was killed by German artillery shrapnel on the Hindenburg Line. His mother received the telegram from the War Department that informed her about Private Graves' death; however, his body was not returned to America until March 29, 1922 when they brought American soldiers' remains from France and Belgium aboard the troopship Cambria to New York City. The U.S. Government had the idea of creating Unknown Soldier and Known Soldier in Arlington Cemetery to honor World War I soldiers. Private Graves was chosen for America's Known Soldier by a blindfolded sailor who picked Graves' name from American soldier remains list, but his mother objected to his burial at Arlington. The War Department wanted to give his body flag-draped coffin a parade on Fifth Avenue, in New York with generals, admirals, and politicians before his mother buried Graves in the cemetery near Antioch Church on April 6, 1922. On September 22, 1923, Romans decided to relocate Private Graves' body from Antioch Cemetery to Myrtle Hill Cemetery as America's Known Soldier after his mother's death and his brother's agreement. Private Graves was buried a third and final time. On November 11, 1923, Armistice Day, Private Graves and the other 33 young men from Floyd County who died in World War I were honored with three Maxim guns and 34 magnolia trees.

== Ellen Axson Wilson ==
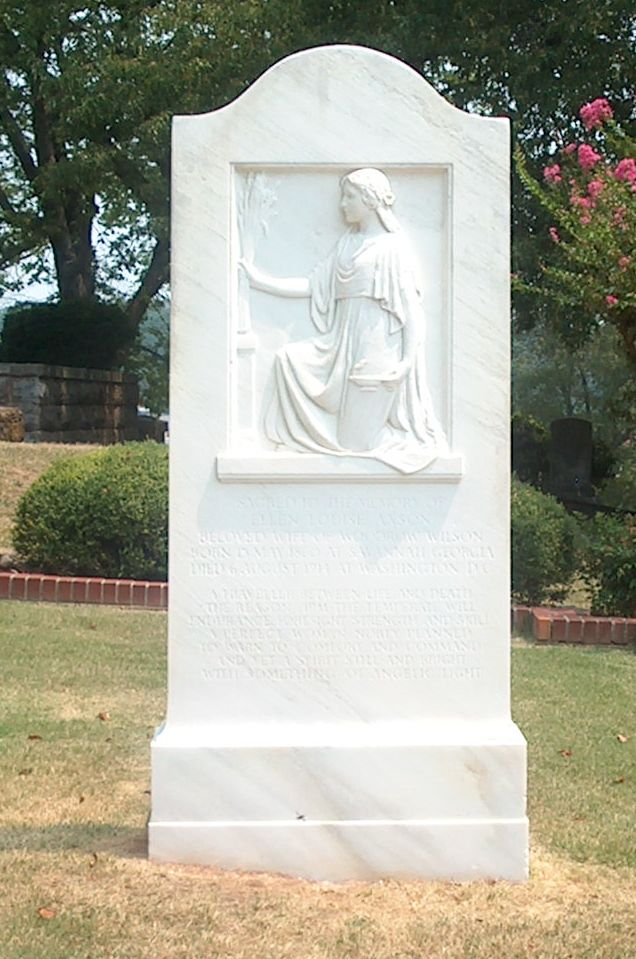
Ellen Axson Wilson's grave

One of two U.S. First Lady buried in Georgia is buried in Myrtle Hill Cemetery. Ellen Axson Wilson, was the first wife of President Woodrow Wilson. Ellen Louise Axson Wilson was the daughter of Reverend S. E. Axson, who was a Presbyterian minister and Margaret Hoyt Axson. She was born in Savannah, Georgia but grew up in Rome. She graduated from the Rome Female College and later studied Art at the Students' Art League in New York. In the Spring of 1883, she met Woodrow Wilson, a young lawyer from Atlanta, Georgia. They were married in 1885 and moved to Bryn Mawr, Pennsylvania where Mr. Wilson taught at the newly formed Bryn Mawr College. After Wilson became the president of Princeton University in 1902 and the governor of New Jersey in 1910, he became the U.S. President in 1912. Ellen was the First Lady who had a studio with a skylight installed at the White House in 1913, and found time for painting and the duties of hostess for the nation. With her health failing slowly from Bright's disease (chronic nephritis), she died August 6, 1914. After her death, her body was taken to Rome by a train with five private cars for President Wilson. The procession, a two-horse drawn funeral carriage, from First Presbyterian Church to Myrtle Hill Cemetery passed down Broad Street, which was lined with Romans. As the graveside service began, rain began to fall as if the sky were weeping. Mrs. Wilson was buried with her father, her mother, and her brother, Stockton Axson.

== Notable burials ==
- Stockton Axson, Secretary of the American Red Cross in World War I.
- Dr. Robert M. Battey, who performed the first bilateral oophorectomy as known as Battey's Operation.
- Nathan Henry Bass Sr., Civil War Confederate Congressman.
- Thomas and Frances Rhea Berry, Martha Berry's parents.
- Confederate Cemetery, 377 Floyd County soldiers lost their lives in American Civil War.
- Richard Vonalbade Gammon, the University of Georgia football player.
- Rosalind Gammon, Gammon's mother who saved Georgia's football.
- Private Charles W. Graves, "Known Soldier".
- Dr. Robert Maxwell Harbin, one of Harbin Hospital (later Clinic in 1948) founders.
- Dr. William Pickens Harbin, one of Harbin Hospital (later Clinic in 1948) founders.
- Colonel Zachariah B. Hargove, one of Rome founders.
- Ethel Hillyer Harris, author.
- Henderson Lovelace Lanham, US Congressman.
- Homer V. M. Miller, 1886 U.S. Senate, first Democrat from Georgia after Civil War.
- Colonel Daniel R. Mitchell, one of the founders of Rome.
- John W. Maddox, Civil War Veteran US Congressman.
- Julia Omberg, first Dr. Battey's oophorectomy patient.
- Colonel Cunningham M. Pennington, who designed the cemetery.
- Daniel S. Printup, who helped select the site of the cemetery.
- Colonel Alfred Shorter, Shorter University's namesake.
- John H. Underwood, a United States Representative, superior court judge.
- Ellen Axson Wilson, first wife of President Woodrow Wilson.
- Helen Woodrow Bones, cousin of President Woodrow Wilson, acting First Lady
- Augustus Romaldus Wright, who served in the U.S. Congress with Abraham Lincoln.
- Dale M. Stone Sr. - Played the "Mighty Mo" organ at the Fox Theatre in 1935 and was the Official Organist for the State of Georgia in the 1950s.

== See also ==
- History of Rome, Georgia
- Cemeteries on the National Register of Historic Places

== Gallery ==
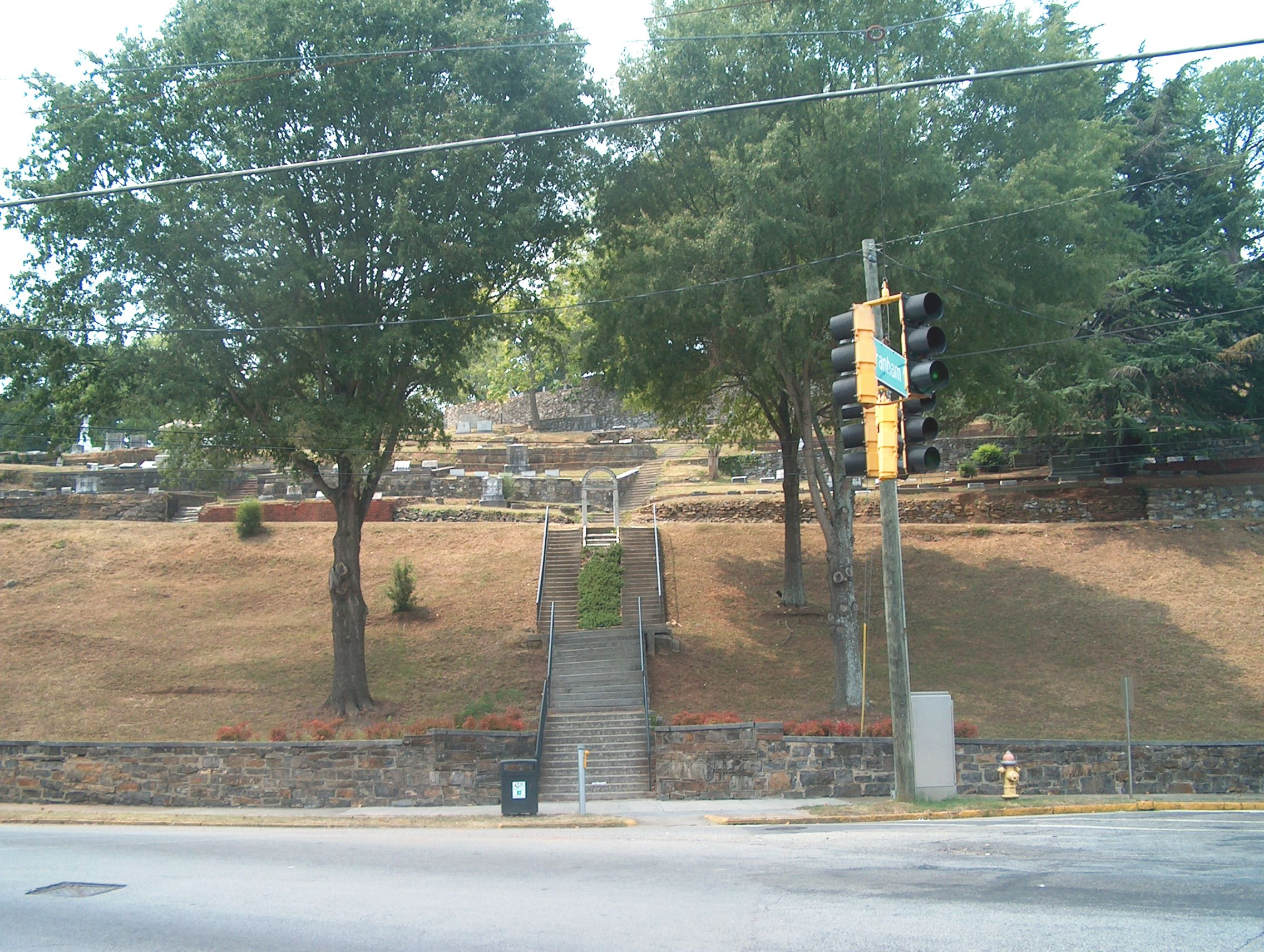
Myrtle Hill Cemetery Grand Stairs

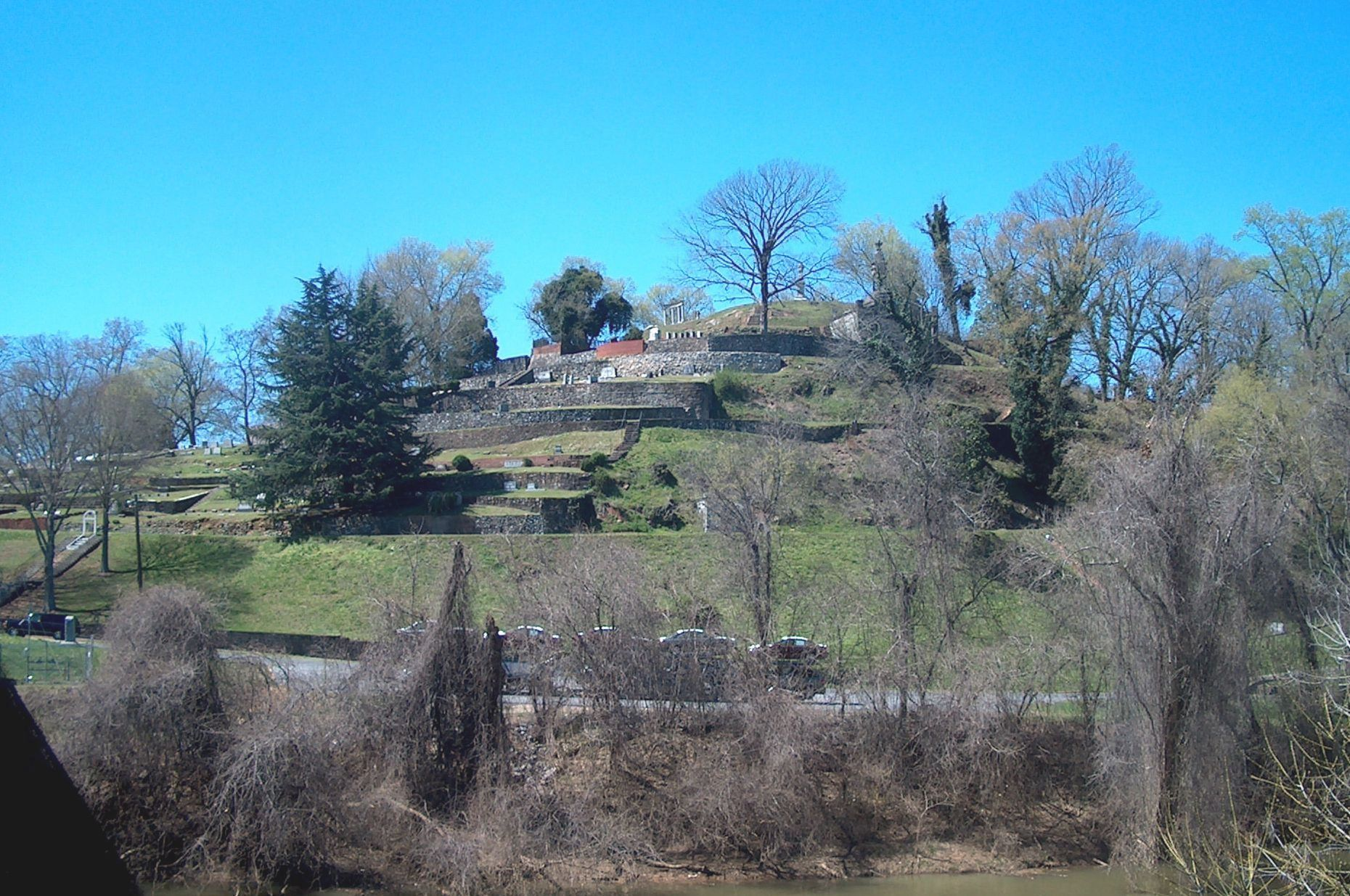
Myrtle Hill Cemetery, layered "wedding cake"

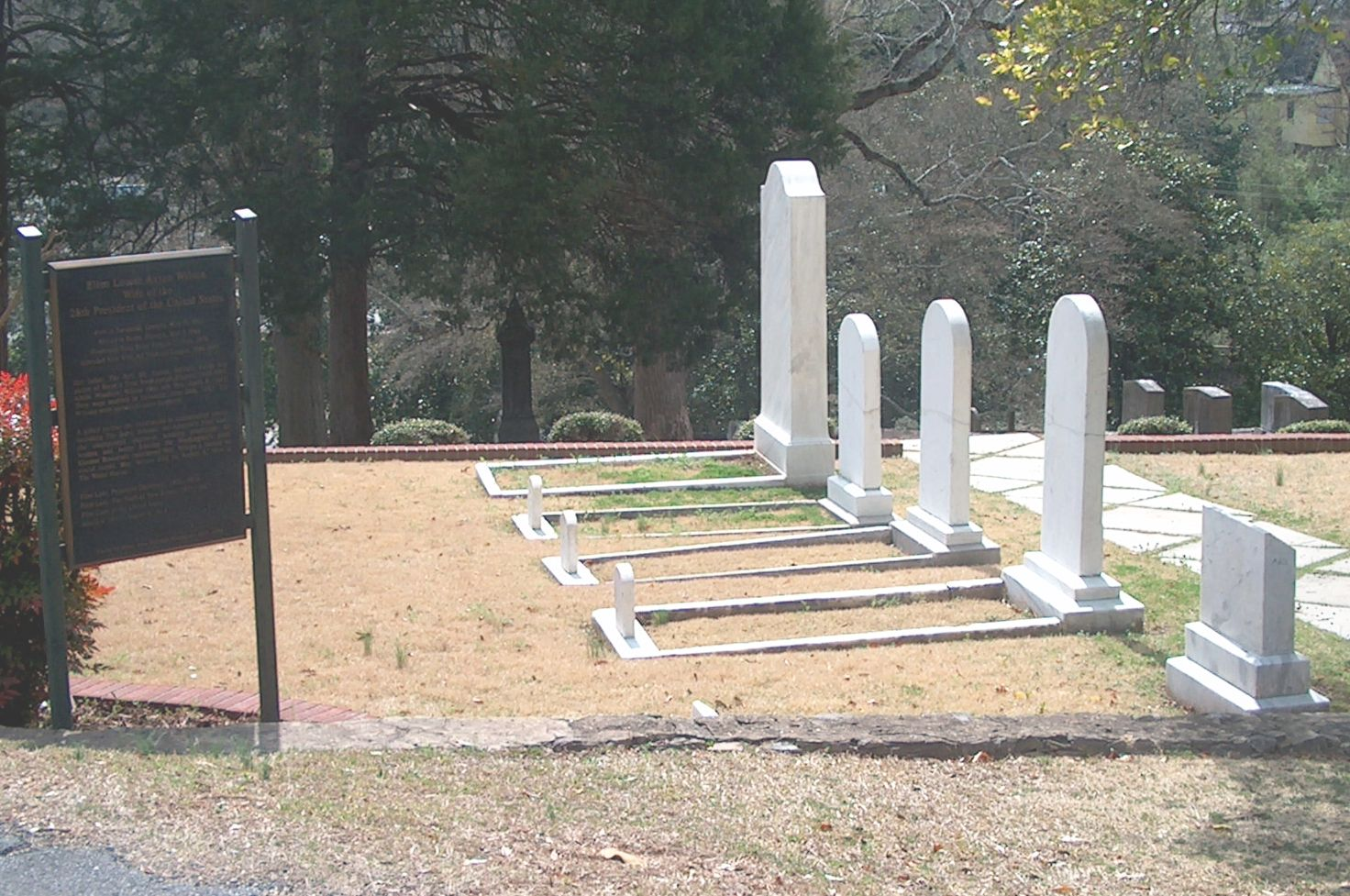
Ellen Wilson and her family's graves

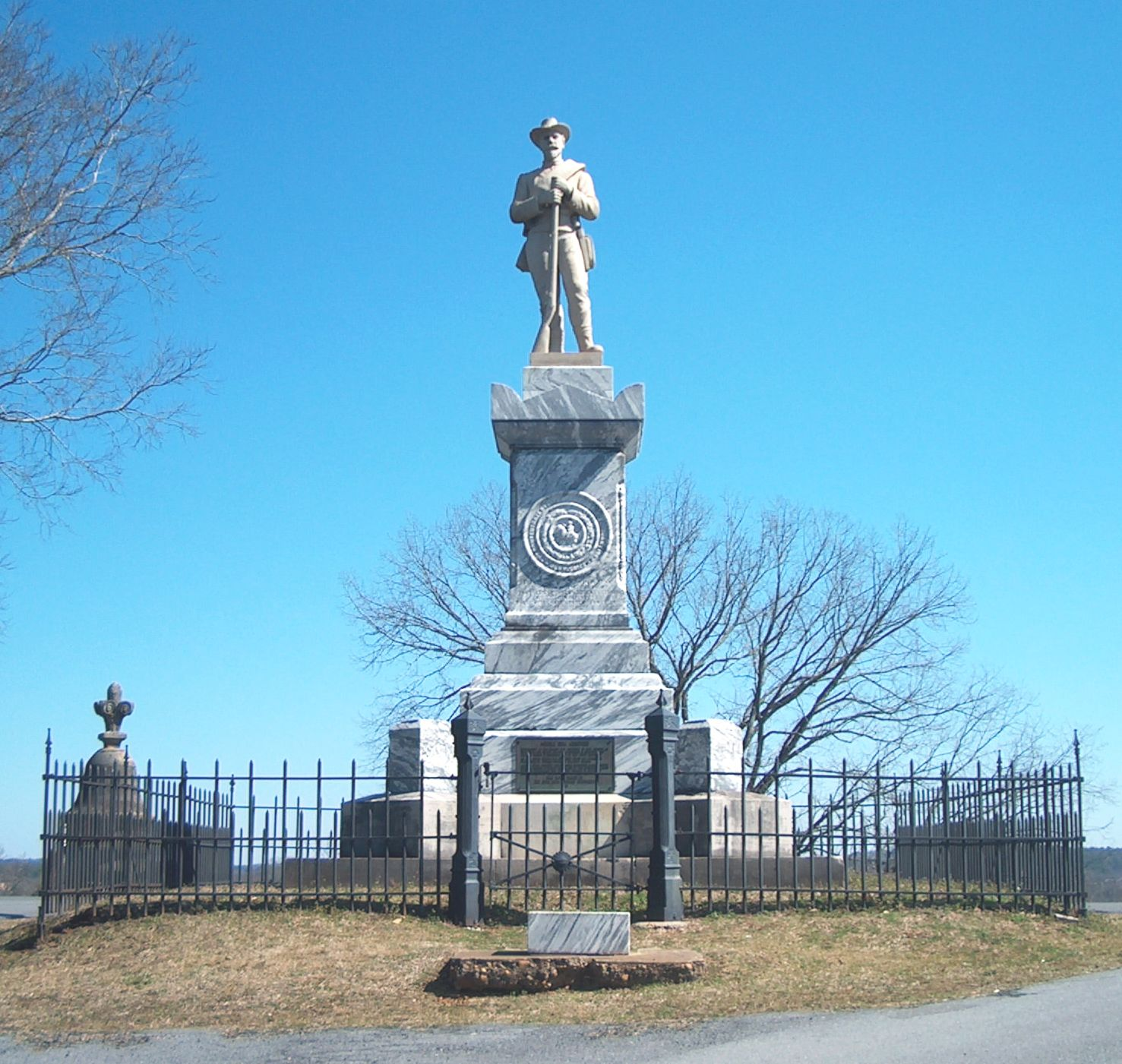
The Confederate Statue watches over Myrtle Hill Cemetery and Rome, Georgia on the top of the hill, "Crown Point"

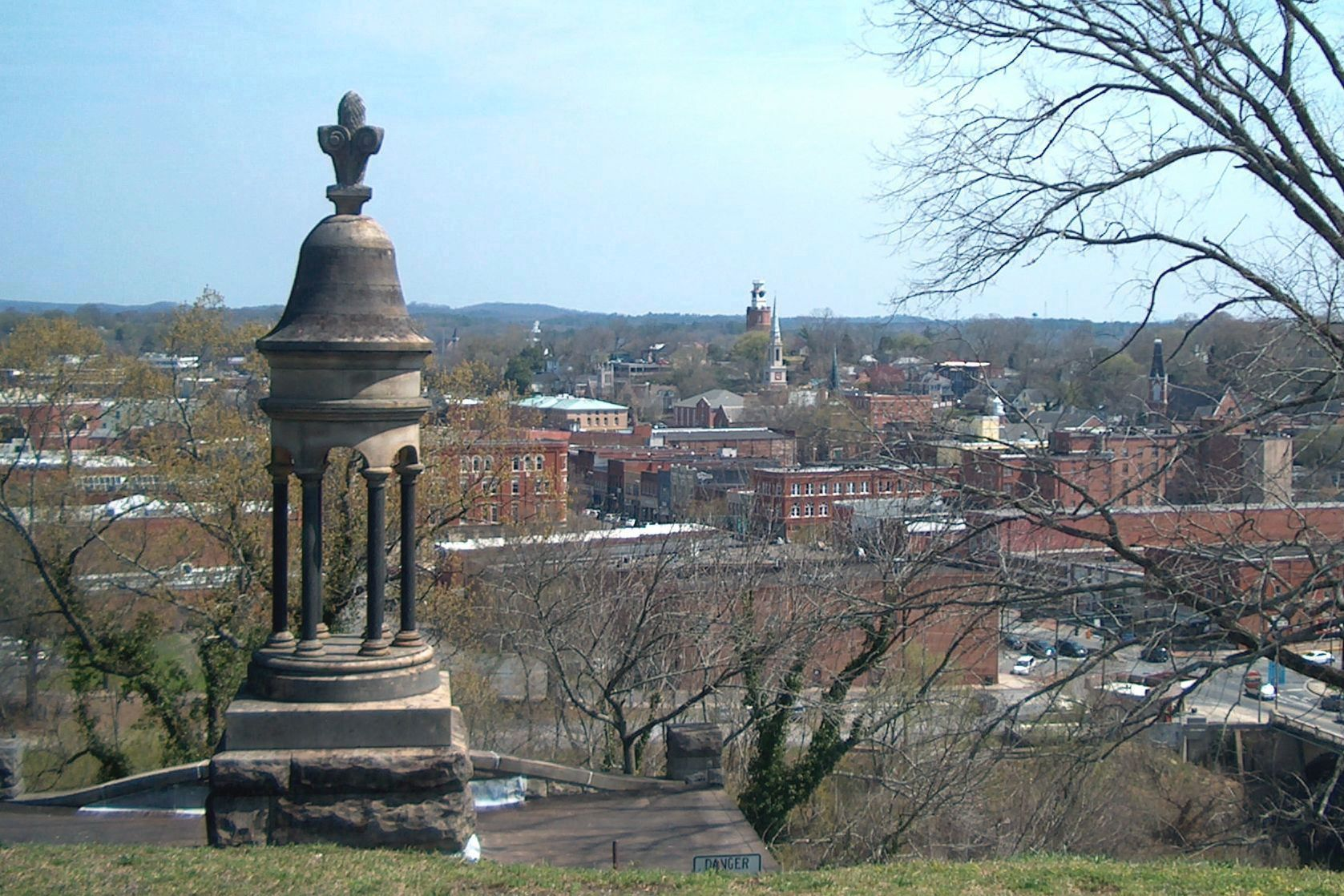
Dr. Battey Vault and view of Rome, Georgia

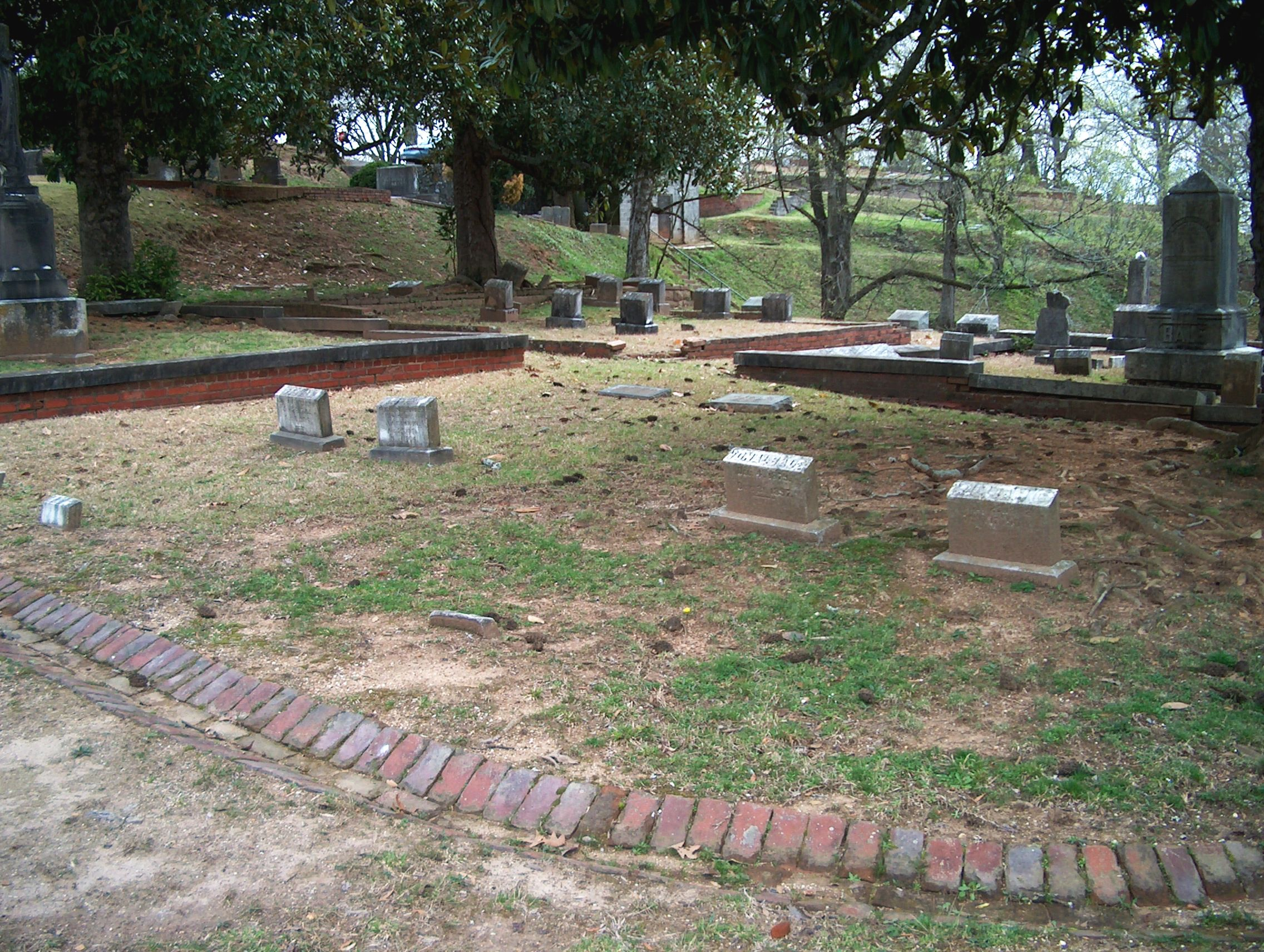
Gammons family site including Vonalbade who played in UGA football and his mother saved Georgia's football.

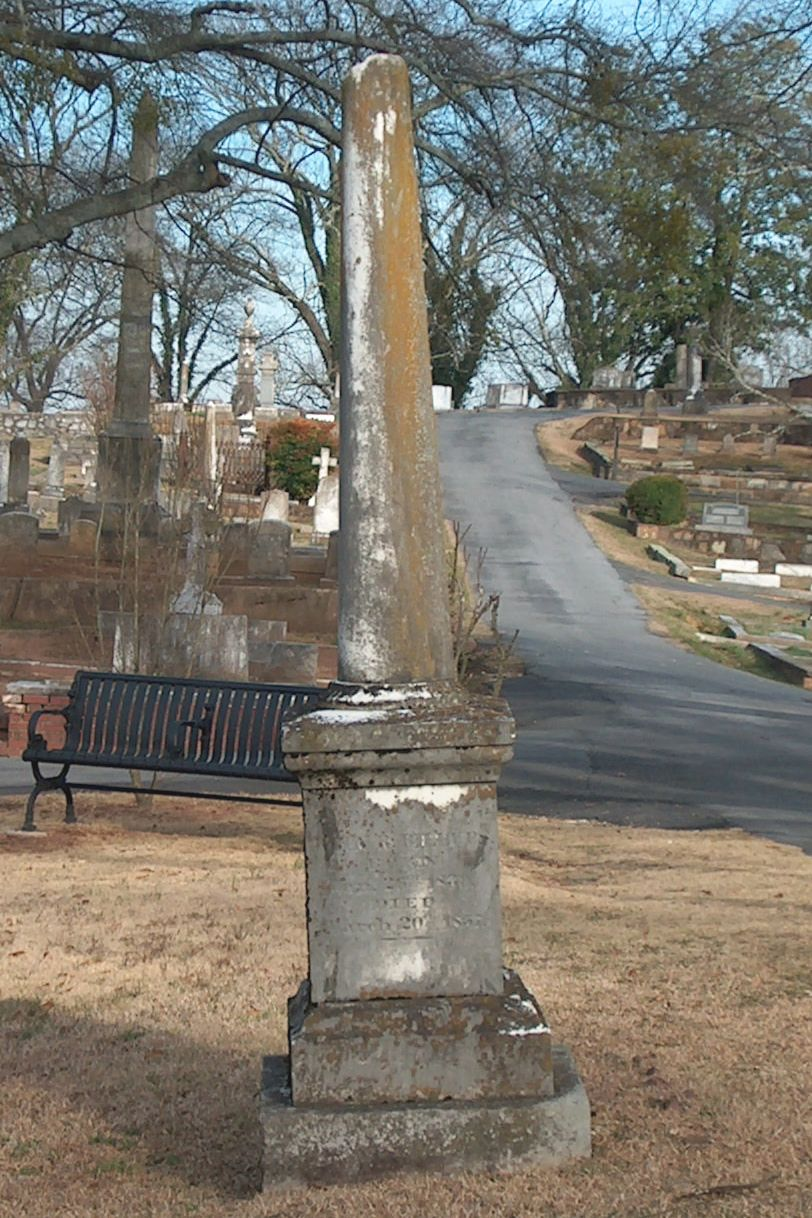
One of first graves, John Billups which tombstone was hit by the American Civil War musket ball.

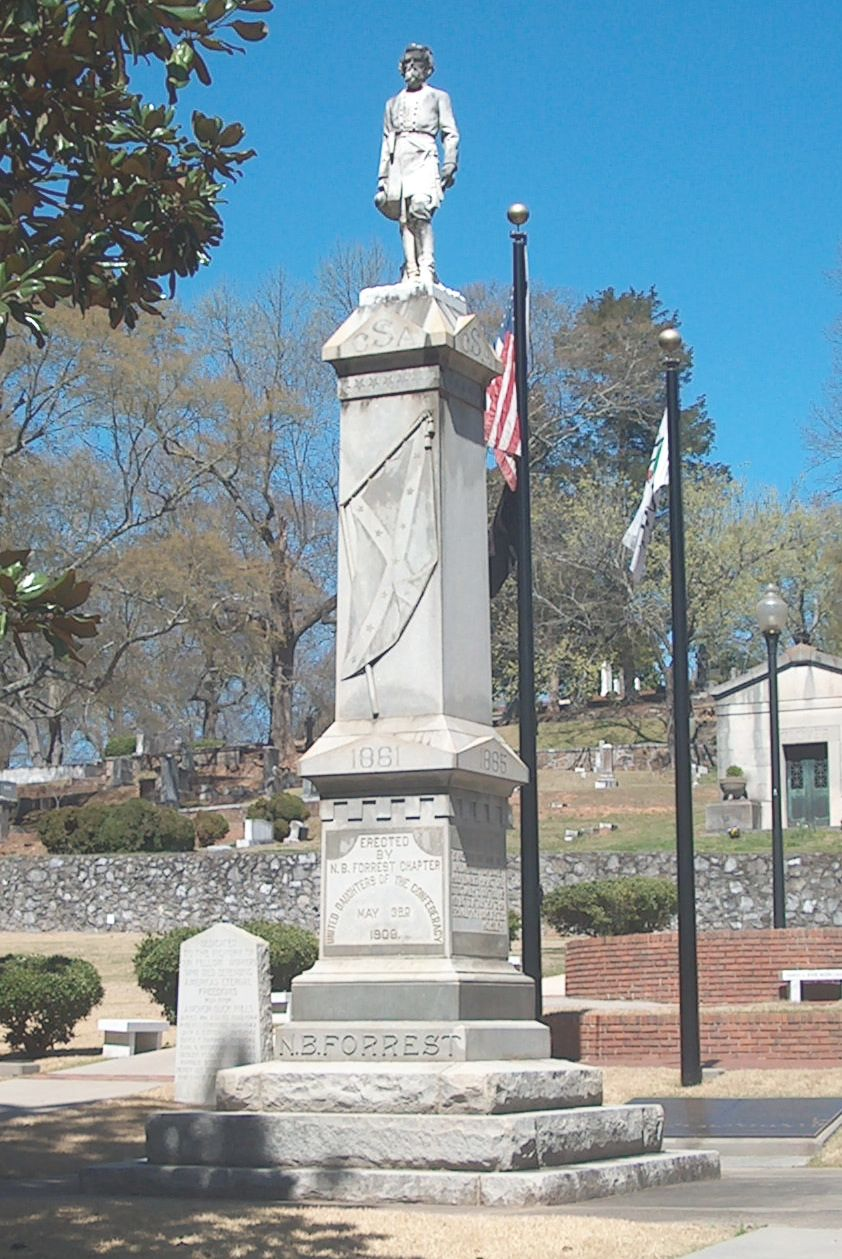
Nathan Bedford Forrest Monument

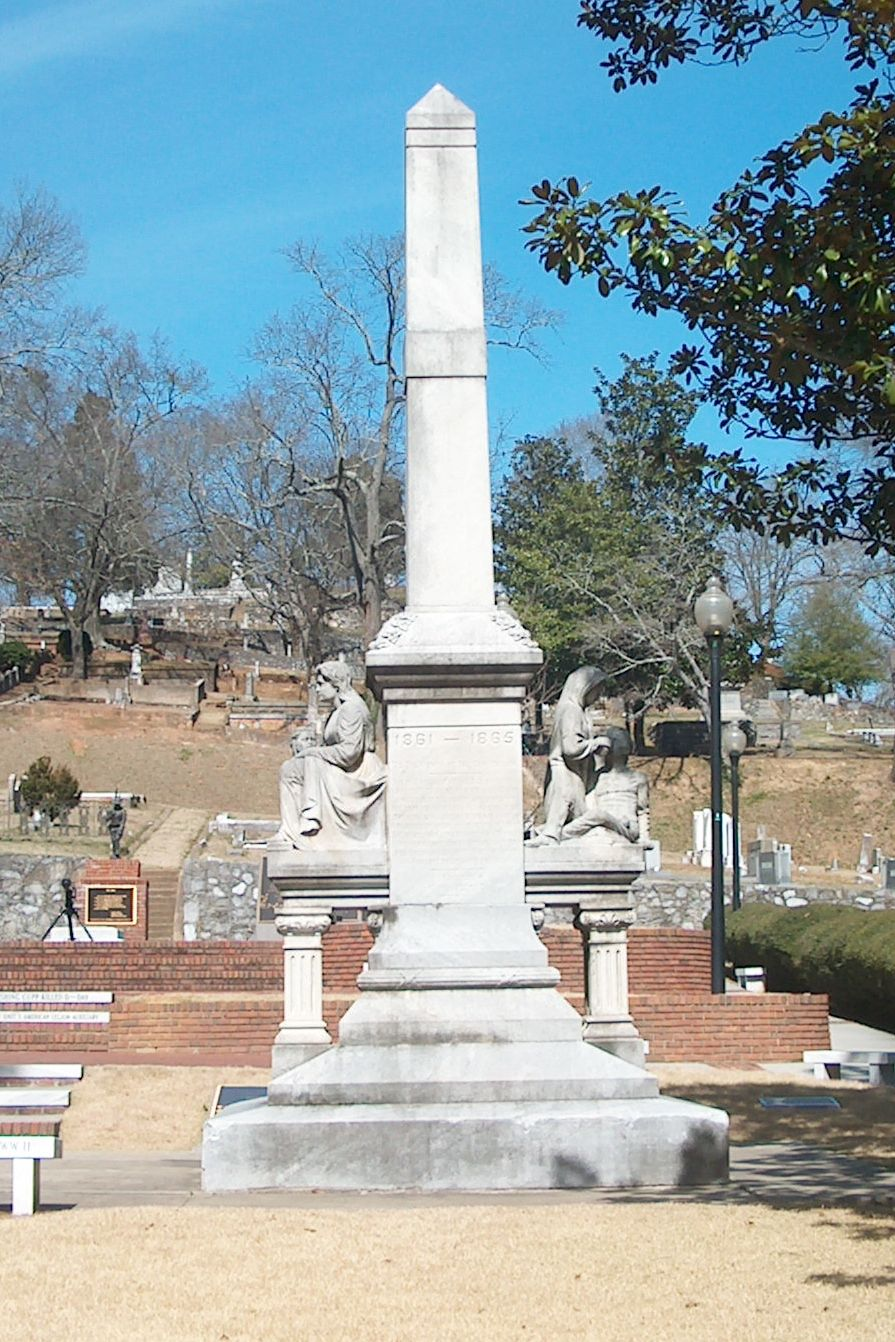
Women Of The Confederacy Monument

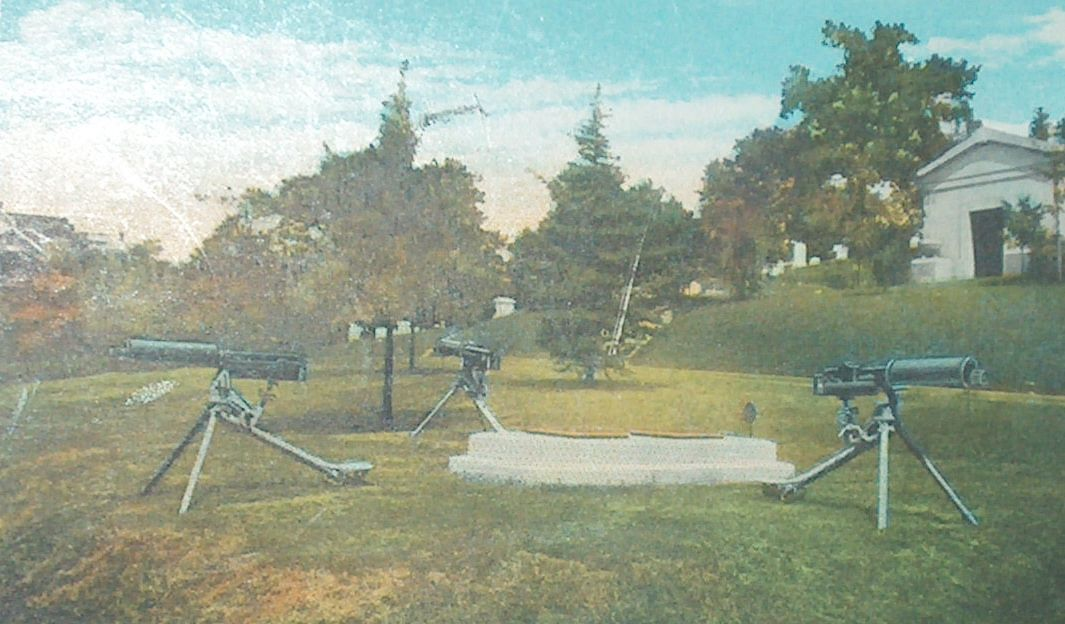
1969 Postcard of Pvt. Charles "Known Soldier" Graves' grave

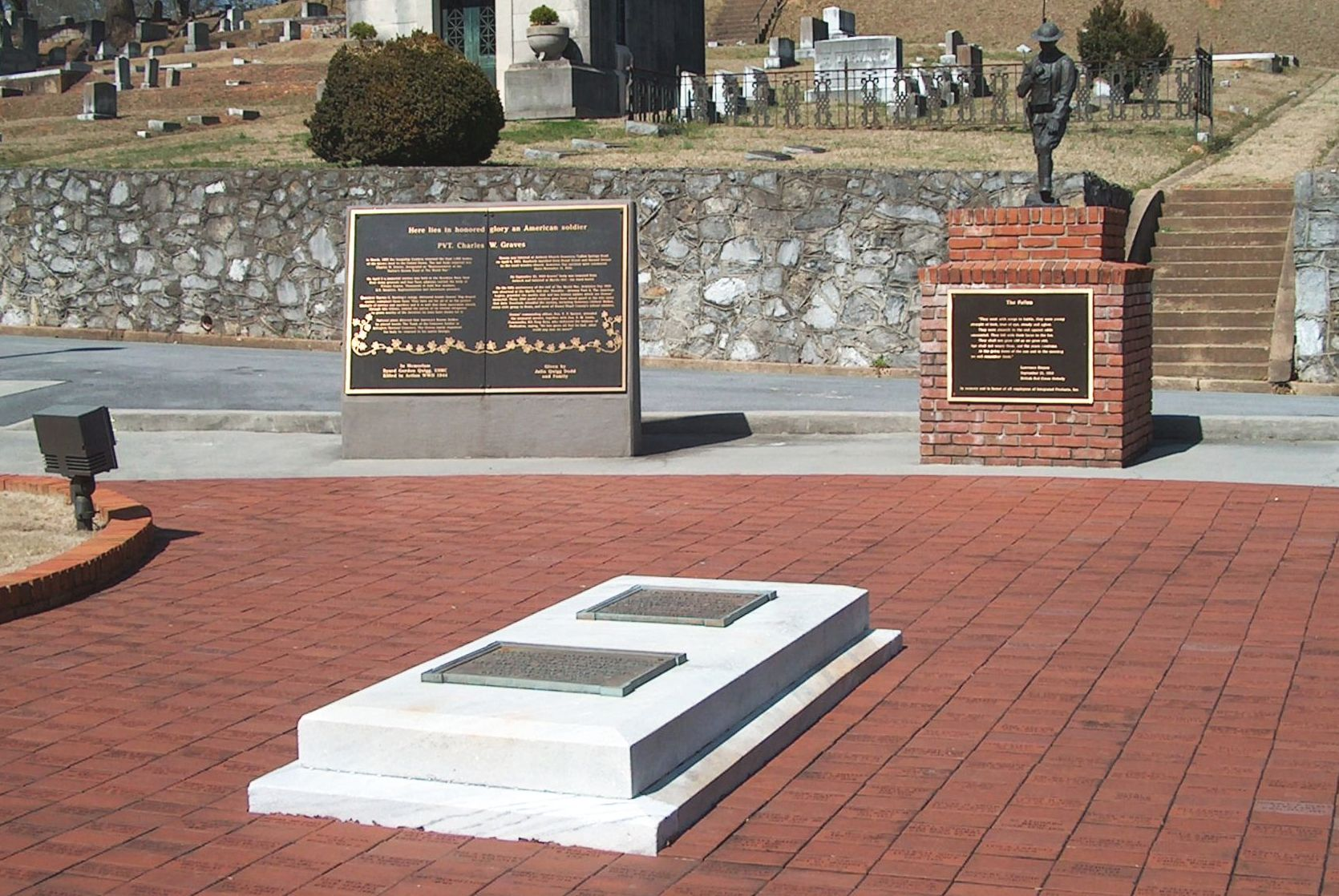
Pvt Charles "Known Soldier" Graves' grave and statue of doughboy

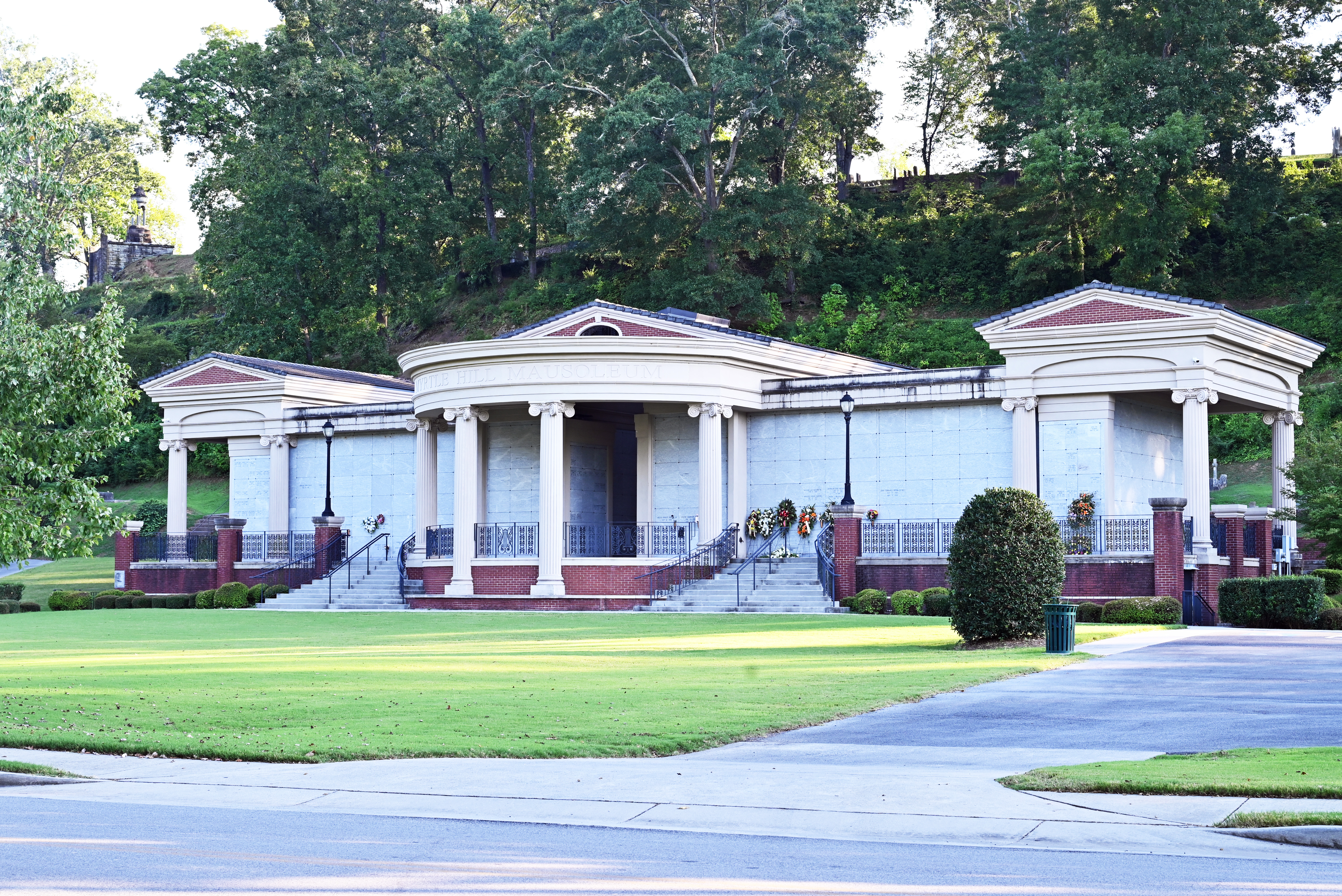
Mausoleum
