= Judson C. Clements =

American politician (1846–1917)

Judson Claudius Clements
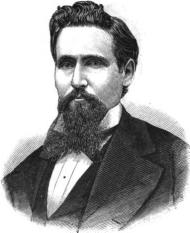

Member of the U.S. House of Representatives from Georgia's 7th district
- In office March 4, 1881 – March 3, 1891
- Preceded by: William Harrell Felton
- Succeeded by: Robert William Everett

4th Chairman of the Interstate Commerce Commission
- In office December 12, 1910 – January 9, 1912
- Preceded by: Martin Augustine Knapp
- Succeeded by: Charles Azro Prouty

Commissioner of the Interstate Commerce Commission
- In office March 17, 1892 – June 18, 1917
- Preceded by: Walter Lawrence Bragg
- Succeeded by: Robert Wickliffe Woolley

Member of the Georgia House of Representatives
- In office 1872-1876

Member of the Georgia Senate from the 44th District
- In office 1877-1880

Personal details
- Born: February 12, 1846 Villanow, Georgia
- Died: June 18, 1917 (aged 71) Washington, D.C.
- Party: Democratic
- Spouses: Bettie Wardlaw (m. 1874; died 1875) Lizzie Eleanor Dulaney (m. 1886)
- Parent(s): Adam Clements; Mary Wilson Hill Parks

Military service
- Allegiance: Confederate States of America
- Branch/service: Confederate States Army
- Years of service: 1864–1865
- Rank: First Lieutenant
- Unit: First Regiment, Georgia State Troops, Stovall's Brigade
- Battles/wars: American Civil War: Battle of Atlanta

Judson Claudius Clements (February 12, 1846 – June 18, 1917) was a U.S. representative from Georgia. For a quarter century a member of the Interstate Commerce Commission, Clements served one year as its chairman. Clements had served as a soldier in the Confederate States Army.

== Early life ==
Judson Clements was the son of Dr. Adam Clements and Mary Wilson Hill Parks, who were both natives of Georgia. Born near Villanow, Georgia, Clements attended the local schools, concluding his childhood schooling when he left an academy near Villanow to join the Confederate States Army in January 1864, while still aged seventeen. His father, Adam C. Clements, had been a member of the Georgia House of Representatives from 1853 to 1854 and from 1861 to 1862, under the Confederacy. Judson Clements served in the Confederate Army during the remainder of the Civil War as a private and first lieutenant in the First Regiment, Georgia State Troops, Stovall's brigade. He was wounded at Atlanta, July 22, 1864. Clements married Bettie Wardlaw, but she died after only a year, and he remained a widower for many years.

== Lawyer and political career ==
Clements graduated from Cumberland School of Law at Cumberland University, Lebanon, Tennessee, in 1868. He was admitted to the bar in 1869 and commenced practice in La Fayette, Georgia, remaining in practice there until 1887. Clements was elected as school commissioner of Walker County in 1871 and 1872. He served as member of the Georgia House of Representatives from 1872 to 1876, then in the Georgia State Senate for the 44th Senatorial District from 1877 to 1880. While in the Georgia General Assembly, he helped write Georgia's railroad laws.

The representative from the Seventh District of Georgia, where Clements resided, was William Harrell Felton, an independent. Clements and his five brothers lived in six different counties of the Seventh District, and Felton found himself faced with local issues from six different counties. However, the campaign was non-confrontational and was described as one of the quietest ever known. Clements' surprising win over Felton by 800 votes was attributed to overconfidence by Felton, hard work by Clements, and Republicas voting solidly for Clements. Clements' brothers would keep his political "fences in good repair", assuring his renomination in subsequent years. Clements was elected as a Democrat to the Forty-seventh and to the four succeeding Congresses (March 4, 1881 – March 3, 1891). While in Congress, he helped write the legislation which authorized the Interstate Commerce Commission.

On December 2, 1886, Clements married Lizzie Eleanor Dulaney, daughter of a wealthy real estate owner in Louisville, Kentucky, in that city. In 1887, Clements moved from La Fayette to Rome, Georgia, where he served for a year as president of the Chattanooga, Rome, and Columbus Railroad. Clements was defeated for renomination in 1890 due to political manoeuvering in his district.

Clements welcomed reconciliation between North and South. At an 1889 reunion of veterans, Clements stated that Northern and Southern veterans had worked together to rebuild the South after the Civil War.

In 1891, President Benjamin Harrison appointed the former congressman as a special United States Attorney to negotiate the purchase of lands for the Chickamauga and Chattanooga National Military Park. Clements had represented the Chickamauga area, and he had worked hard for the passage of the bill authorizing the park. In an April 1891 interview, Clements indicated that he had been able to secure 1,300-1,400 acres but progress had been slow due to absentee owners and the unwillingness of landowners to live under War Department rules in the incipient park. He stated that he expected most negotiations to be concluded by late 1891.

== Interstate Commerce Commission ==
On March 6, 1892, Clements was appointed by President Harrison to the Interstate Commerce Commission, filling the unexpired term of Commissioner Walter L. Bragg of Alabama, who had died. After being confirmed by the Senate, Clements was sworn in on March 17, 1892. On December 12, 1910, with the resignation of longtime Commission chair Martin A. Knapp, he became acting chairman of the Committee, and in 1911 became chairman of the Commission for a one-year term. In addition to being appointed by President Harrison, he was reappointed by Presidents Grover Cleveland, William McKinley, Theodore Roosevelt, and Woodrow Wilson, and served as a commissioner until his death in Washington, D.C., June 18, 1917.

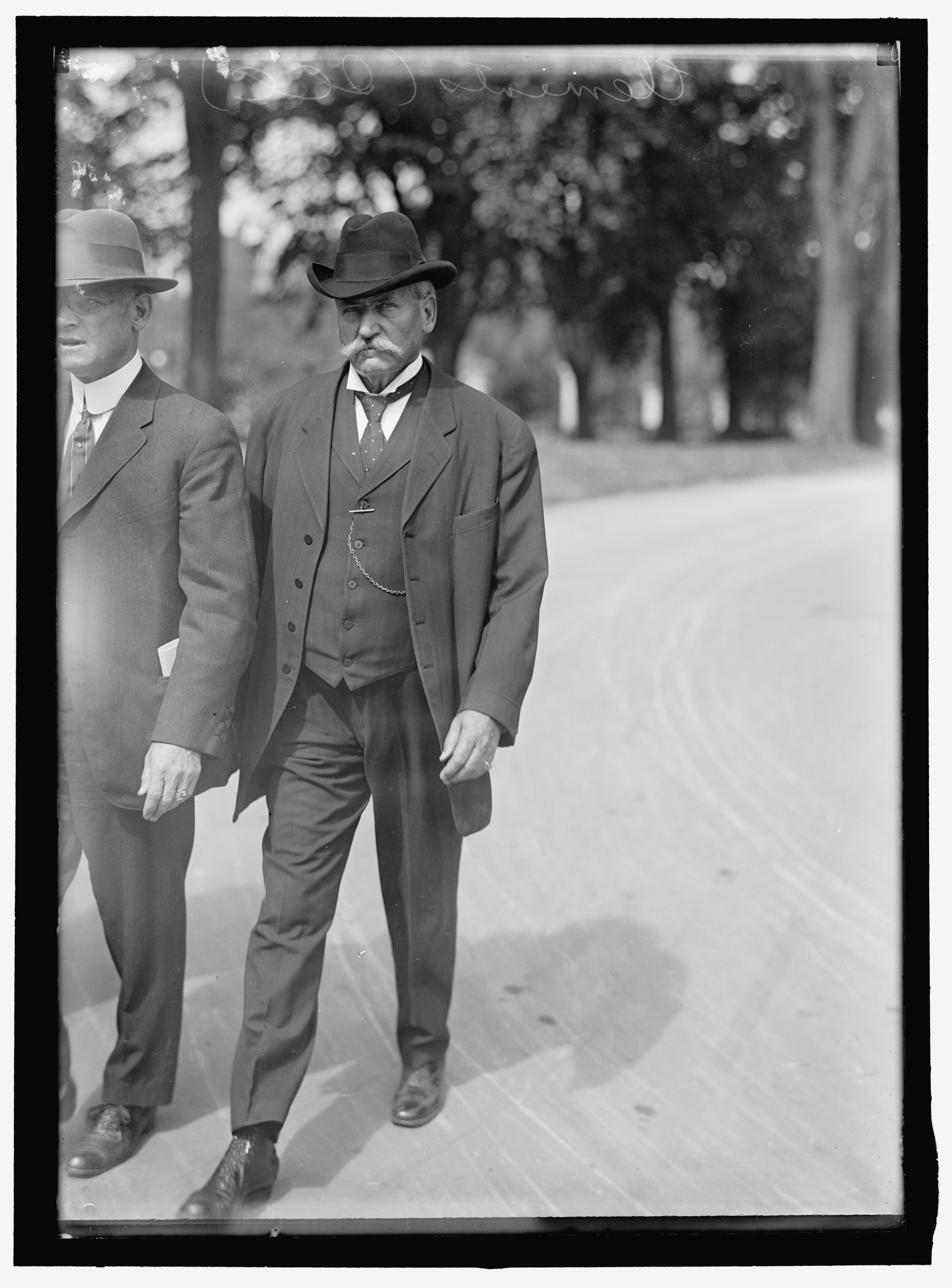

In 1916, Clements proposed that no worker be allowed to quit a railway company or urge others to do the same until the Commission had the opportunity to investigate the matter in a fair and equitable manner. Locomotive Engineers Journal decried the proposal, especially as no provision was made for preventing the railroads from discharging workers at will.

As a commissioner, he was considered to be a radical. Clements was among the commissioners who led the fight for the Commission to get real power over the railroads, a battle which nearly led to the Commission being legislated out of existence but which resulted in the passing of the Hepburn Act in 1906. Clements favored the physical valuation of railroads, which would aid in accessing taxation and allow the Commission to better evaluate rate increase requests. In 1911, after serving a month as acting chairman, he was elected chairman for a one-year term despite the reported opposition of President William Howard Taft, who wanted Republican Edgar Erastus Clark appointed chairman instead. However, at the time, the Commission invariably appointed its senior member as chairman, and Clements was elected. His predecessors had continued to serve as chair until they left the Commission; however, Clements chose to serve only the one-year term. He was interred in Cave Hill Cemetery, Louisville, Kentucky. His twenty-five years on the Interstate Commerce Commission remained a record until surpassed by Balthasar H. Meyer, who served 28 years from 1911 to 1939.

It was said of Clements that no opinion written by him was overturned in substance by the Supreme Court of the United States. Railway Age Gazette, in urging his 1913 reappointment, noted that while Clements had been criticized, his integrity and capacity for the position were beyond question.

He died on June 18, 1918, in Washington, D.C.

U.S. House of Representatives
Preceded by William H. Felton	Member of the U.S. House of Representatives from Georgia's 7th congressional district March 4, 1881 – March 3, 1891	Succeeded by Robert W. Everett
