= Robert W. Everett =

American politician

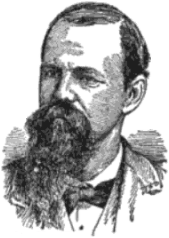

Member of the U.S. House of Representatives from Georgia's 7th district
- In office March 4, 1891 – March 3, 1893
- Preceded by: Judson C. Clements
- Succeeded by: John W. Maddox

Personal details
- Born: March 3, 1839 near Hayneville, Georgia
- Died: February 27, 1915 (aged 75) Rockmart, Georgia
- Party: Democratic
- Education: Mercer University

Robert William Everett (March 3, 1839 – February 27, 1915) was a U.S. representative from Georgia.

== Biography ==
Born near Hayneville, Georgia, Everett attended the village schools and Hayneville Academy. He was graduated from Mercer University, Macon, Georgia, in 1859. His parents were Alexander and Harriet Blanche (Bryan) Everett. He was of English descent. He taught school in Polk and Houston Counties for two years. He entered the Confederate States Army as a sergeant in Captain Gartrell's company, Gen. Nathan Bedford Forrest's escort squadron, and served until the close of the Civil War. He again engaged in teaching school in Houston County and also in Cedartown, Georgia, until 1872, when he abandoned the profession for agricultural pursuits. He served as commissioner of roads and revenue of Polk County 1875-1880. He served as member of the Board of Education of Polk County 1880-1891 and served as president of the board 1882-1891. He served as member of the State house of representatives 1882-1885.

Everett was elected as a Democrat to the Fifty-second Congress (March 4, 1891 – March 3, 1893). He was not a candidate for renomination in 1892. He resumed agricultural pursuits. He was again a member of the State house of representatives in 1898 and 1899. He lived in retirement until his death in Rockmart, Georgia, on February 27, 1915. He was interred in Cedartown Cemetery, Cedartown, Georgia.

U.S. House of Representatives
Preceded by Judson C. Clements	Member of the U.S. House of Representatives from Georgia's 7th congressional district March 4, 1891 – March 3, 1893	Succeeded by John W. Maddox
