= John W. Maddox =

American politician

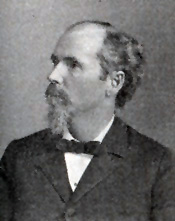
- Johns Maddox

Member of the U.S. House of Representatives from Georgia's 7th district
- In office March 4, 1893 – March 3, 1905
- Preceded by: Robert W. Everett
- Succeeded by: Gordon Lee

Personal details
- Born: June 3, 1848 Gore, Georgia, U.S.
- Died: September 27, 1922 (aged 74) Rome, Georgia, U.S.
- Resting place: Myrtle Hill Cemetery
- Party: Democratic

John Wilson Maddox (June 3, 1848 – September 27, 1922) was a U.S. representative from Georgia.

Born on a farm near Gore, Georgia, Maddox attended modest schools. During the Civil War, he enlisted in the Georgia State Guard in Company E, Sixth Georgia State Cavalry, in 1863 and served until the end of the war. He attended school in Summerville and Bethel Church, and engaged in agricultural pursuits and in railroad construction work in 1871. He was Deputy sheriff of Chattooga County, Georgia.

He studied law and was admitted to the bar in 1877, commencing practice in Summerville, Georgia. He served as mayor of Summerville in 1877, County commissioner from 1878 to 1880, and as a member of the Georgia House of Representatives from 1880 to 1884, and of the Georgia State Senate from 1884 to 1886. Maddox was elected judge of the superior court, Rome circuit, in 1886, and was reelected in 1890, resigning the office September 1, 1892. He moved to Rome, Georgia, in 1890.

Maddox was elected as a Democrat to the Fifty-third and to the five succeeding Congresses (March 4, 1893 – March 3, 1905). He was not a candidate for renomination in 1904, and resumed the practice of law. He also served as mayor of Rome in 1906 and 1907, and was appointed judge of the Superior Court of Georgia in 1908. Maddox was elected in to that office 1910 and served until his resignation on February 1, 1912, having become president of the State Mutual Life Insurance Co.

He died in Rome, Georgia, on September 27, 1922, and was interred in Myrtle Hill Cemetery. His grandson of the same name, known as John W. Maddox Sr., is the namesake of the John Maddox Track at Barron Stadium in Rome, Georgia.

U.S. House of Representatives
Preceded by Robert W. Everett	Member of the U.S. House of Representatives from Georgia's 7th congressional district March 4, 1893 – March 3, 1905	Succeeded by Gordon Lee
