= Augustus R. Wright =

American politician

Augustus Romaldus Wright
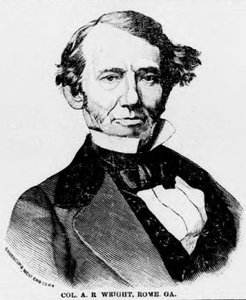
- Born: June 16, 1813; Wrightsboro, Georgia
- Died: March 31, 1891 (aged 77); Rome, Georgia
- Burial place: Myrtle Hill Cemetery
- Military career
- Allegiance: Confederate States of America
- Branch: Confederate States Army
- Service years: 1861–1865
- Rank: Colonel
- Unit: Army of Northern Virginia
- Commands: Georgia 38th Infantry Regiment
- Conflicts: American Civil War

Augustus Romaldus Wright (June 16, 1813 – March 31, 1891) was an American politician and lawyer, who briefly served against the United States as a colonel in the Confederate States Army during the American Civil War. He resigned his commission to serve in the Confederate Congress.

== Early life ==
Augustus Wright was born in Wrightsboro, Georgia and attended public school in Appling. Wright attended the Franklin College of Arts and Sciences, the founding college of the University of Georgia in Athens where he was a member of the Phi Kappa Literary Society. Wright studied law at the Litchfield Law School in Connecticut and was admitted to the State Bar of Georgia in 1835—becoming a practicing attorney in Crawfordville, Georgia, the same year. From 1842 until 1849, Wright served as judge of the superior court of the Cherokee circuit and from 1855 to 1857 as a judge of the superior court of Georgia.

Wright owned slaves.

== Political career ==
In 1856, Augustus Wright was elected to the U.S. House of Representatives and served one term from 1857 to 1859. He ran as an anti-secession delegate for a seat at the Georgia Secession Convention but lost to his son in law, Francis Shropshire. He was one of ten Georgia delegates to the Confederate Constitution Convention in Montgomery, Alabama, in 1861.

Wright served in the First Confederate Congress. Augustus Wright organized "Wright’s Legion" of Georgia volunteers and served as a colonel in the Georgia 38th Infantry Regiment for the Confederate States Army in the Army of Northern Virginia. U.S. President Abraham Lincoln offered Wright the position of provisional governor of Georgia in 1864 if the state withdrew from the Confederacy, which did not happen.

After the war, Wright served as a member of the Georgia constitutional convention in 1877. He died in 1891 at his home near Rome, Georgia, and was buried in Rome's Myrtle Hill Cemetery.

== See also ==
- Confederate States of America, causes of secession, "Died of states' rights"
- List of signers of the Georgia Ordinance of Secession

U.S. House of Representatives
Preceded by John H. Lumpkin	U.S. Representative of Georgia's 5th congressional district March 4, 1857 – March 3, 1859	Succeeded by John W. H. Underwood
