= John William Henderson Underwood =

American politician

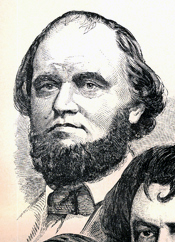
John W. H. Underwood

John William Henderson Underwood (November 20, 1816 – July 18, 1888) was a U.S. Democratic politician.

He was born in Ellenton, Georgia. He studied law and was admitted to the Georgia bar in 1835, and began practicing law in Clarkesville. He was an active participant in Georgia state politics for the duration of his adult life. He served as the solicitor general of the western judicial circuit of Georgia from 1843 to 1847. He was elected as a Democrat to the United States House of Representatives from Georgia and served from March 4, 1859, until January 23, 1861, when he withdrew, having joined the Confederacy. He died in Rome, Georgia and buried in Myrtle Hill Cemetery.

U.S. House of Representatives
Preceded by August R. Wright	Member of the U.S. House of Representatives from Georgia's 5th congressional district March 4, 1859 – January 23, 1861	Succeeded by American Civil War
