= Gordon Lee (Georgia politician) =

American politician

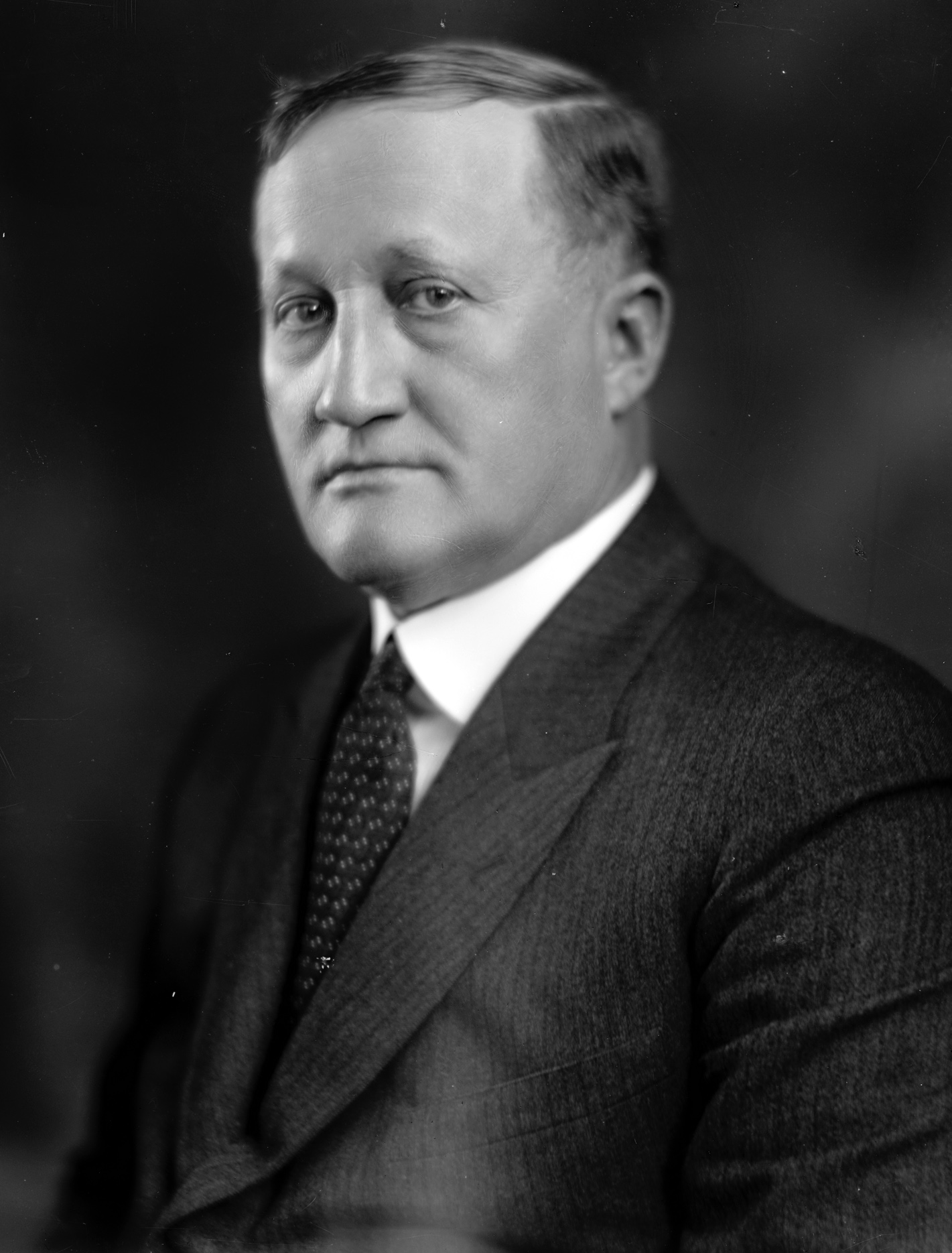
Gordon Lee, US Representative from Georgia.

Gordon Lee (May 29, 1859 – November 7, 1927) was an American politician who represented Georgia in the United States House of Representatives from 1905–1926.

Lee was born near Ringgold, Georgia. He attended the common schools and later graduated from Emory College in Oxford, Georgia in 1880. After college, he engaged in agricultural pursuits and in manufacturing in Chickamauga, Georgia.

Lee was a member of the Georgia House of Representatives in 1894 and 1895. He served in the Georgia Senate from 1902 to 1904 and was appointed to the Georgia Memorial Board by Governor William Yates Atkinson. Lee was elected as a Democrat to the fifty-ninth and to the ten succeeding congresses (March 4, 1905 – March 3, 1927), but was not a candidate for renomination in 1926.

While in Congress, Lee was a member of the National Forest Reservation Commission, which was created by the Weeks Act of March 1, 1911. He was also a delegate to the Democratic National Convention in 1924. He resumed agricultural pursuits and died at Chickamauga, Georgia, in 1927. He was buried in Chickamauga Cemetery.

U.S. House of Representatives
Preceded by John W. Maddox	Member of the U.S. House of Representatives from Georgia's 7th congressional district March 4, 1905 – March 3, 1927	Succeeded by Malcolm C. Tarver
