= Harbin Clinic =

Medical clinic in Georgia, United States

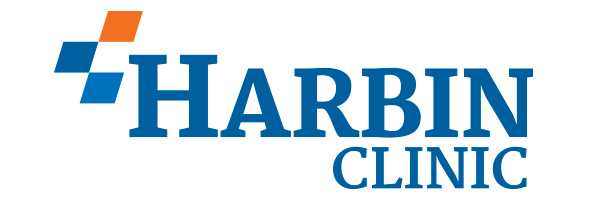

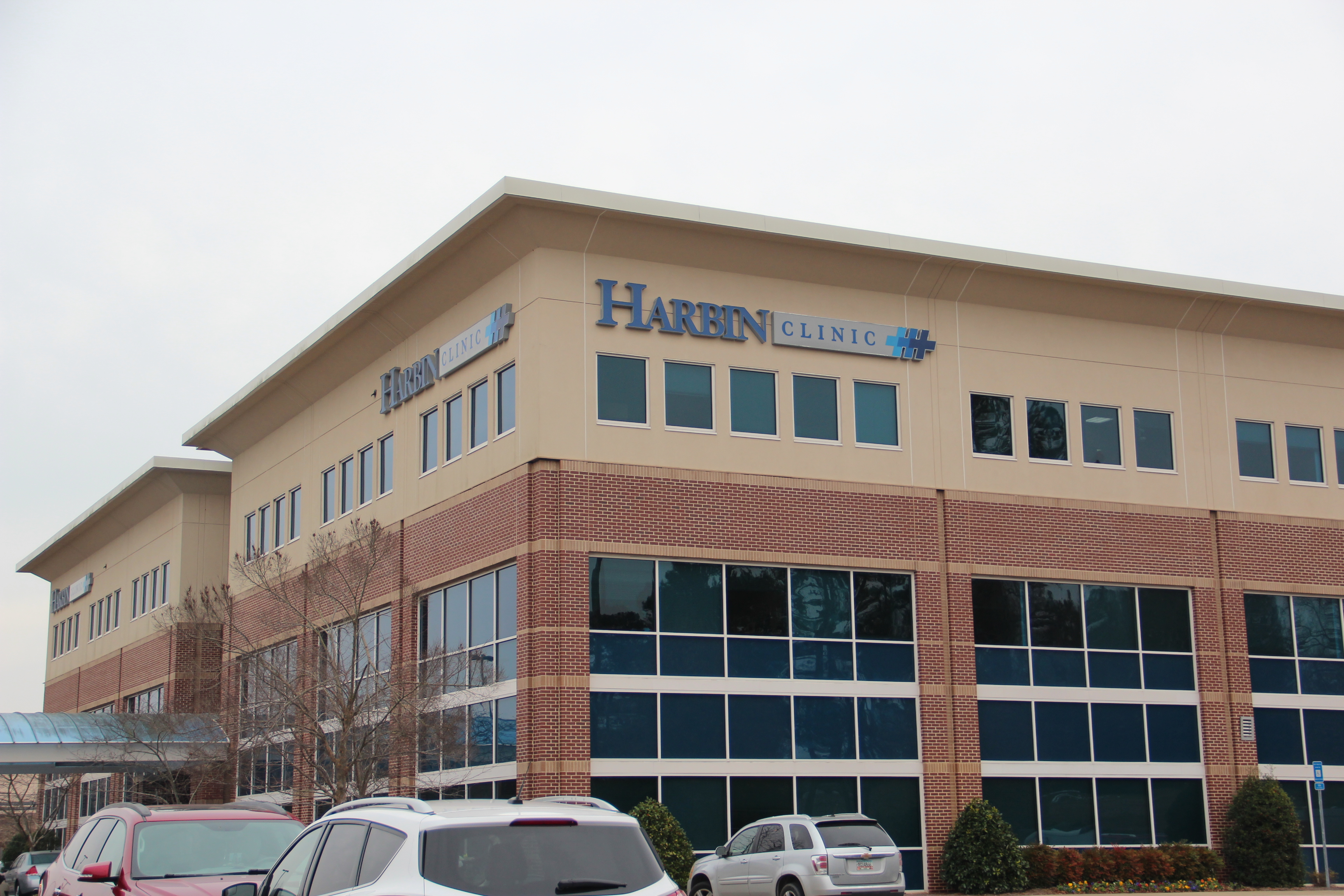
- A Harbin Clinic in Cartersville, Georgia
- Company type: Private
- Industry: Healthcare
- Founded: 1908
- Founder: Drs. W.P. and R.M. Harbin
- Headquarters: Rome, Georgia, United States
- Number of locations: 27 locations in Northwest Georgia
- Area served: Alabama, Georgia, Tennessee
- Key people: Kenna Stock (President & CEO); Charles Edward McBride, III, M.D., M.B.A (Medical Director)
- Number of employees: 1,400
- Divisions: 32 different medical specialties
- Website: www.harbinclinic.com

The Harbin Clinic is a privately owned multi-specialty medical clinic in Rome, Georgia.

The Harbin Clinic was established in 1948 by Drs. W.P. and R.M. Harbin. The Harbin Clinic now has more than 27 satellite offices throughout Rome, Adairsville, Bremen, Calhoun, Cartersville, Cedartown, Summerville, and Trion.

== History ==
Dr. Robert Maxwell Harbin (1864–1939) received his medical training at Bellevue Hospital Medical College of New York City, and first practiced medicine with his father, Dr. Wylie Reeder Harbin, in Calhoun, Georgia in 1888. In 1894, Robert moved to Rome, Georgia, and established his own practice.

Dr. William Pickens Harbin (1872–1942) ("Dr. Will") earned his Medical Doctorate in 1897, also from the Bellevue Hospital Medical College. Dr. Will Harbin moved to Rome in 1898 and accepted his brother Robert's offer to join his medical practice in Rome. Will soon joined the United States Army during the Spanish–American War, accepting a commission as acting assistant surgeon.

After the war, in 1901, Will returned to Rome and the Harbin brothers' first practice was located on the second floor at 206 Broad Street, and they employed two horse & buggy drivers to keep buggies ready to race the doctors to the homes of patients with medical emergencies. The fee for an office visit was usually $1, and the fees for home visits were $2 to $3, but payments were often delayed until the cotton crops came in. Common health problems included smallpox, diphtheria, typhoid, pellagra, tuberculosis and diabetes, with diagnosis depending on active symptoms, physical findings, and sputum examinations.

In 1908, Robert and Will founded the Harbin Hospital with 12 beds by converting a house at the Southeastern corner of Third Avenue and First Street. In 1911 they established a training program for nurses, and in 1919, a new four-story fire-proof hospital building was constructed next door, and the original hospital was converted into a nurses' dormitory.

In 1919, Harbin Hospital acquired an X-Ray machine and became one of the first hospitals in the country to offer radiation treatment for cancer.

In 1920, three stories were added to the hospital, expanding the bed capacity to 75. Many modern systems were included, such as steam heating, electrical lights, silent call systems, hot and cold running water in each room, linoleum floors, three complete operating suites, a private telephone exchange, and a safe-gate elevator running from basement to roof. The next year, the hospital was recognized by the American College of Surgeons as one of four hospitals in Georgia to meet the board's standards of excellence.

In 1925, the Harbin Hospital introduced what was then an innovative orthopedic program of following the treatment of bone fractures with physiotherapy (known today as physical therapy). Other innovations in following years included Dr. Will Harbin performing the first Caesarean section ever performed in Floyd County, the first blood matching and blood transfusion in the county, and the first X-ray camera in Rome used for the first bone and dental films.

By the time Robert died in 1939 and was buried in Myrtle Hill Cemetery, many other physicians had been added to the staff, and in the 1930s and 1940s, a new generation of Harbin doctors joined, including Robert Jr. and 3 sons of Will: William Jr., Bannester, and Thomas. William died in 1942.

In 1948, Harbin Hospital was transformed into the Harbin Clinic by eliminating overnight care, which was effectively replaced by the expansion of the Floyd County Hospital to 120 beds. At this time the building was renovated and the Harbin Hospital School of Nursing was terminated.

The next major change came in 1969, when the medical group purchased 8 acres (32,000 m^{2}) from Berry College on the Southwest corner of Martha Berry Boulevard and Redmond Road, and built a new facility with 34,000 square feet (3,200 m^{2}) of office space for a staff of 20 doctors, a dentist, and a pharmacy.

Since then, the Harbin Clinic has continued to expand, serving an 11-county referral base consisting of Bartow, Chattooga, Cherokee, Floyd, Gordon, Haralson, Polk, Walker, and Paulding counties in Georgia and Cherokee and DeKalb counties in Alabama. The clinic also has more than 20 satellite offices throughout Rome, Calhoun, Cartersville, Cedartown, Adairsville, Summerville and Bremen.

Harbin Clinic was affiliated with PhyCor, Inc, a medical management company based in Nashville, TN from 1996 to 2000. Upon PhyCor's reorganization, Harbin repurchased its assets and regained its independent status.

Merged with Atrium Health Floyd in April 2024.

== Departments ==
The Harbin Clinic offers a wide variety of departments, including:

- Acupuncture
- Audiology
- Bariatric center
- Behavioral sciences
- Cancer center
- Cardiac rehabilitation
- Cardiology
- Cardiology–pediatrics
- Cardiothoracic surgery
- Chiropractic medicine
- Clinical research
- Dermatology
- Diabetes management center
- Endocrinology
- Family practice
- Gastroenterology
- General surgery
- Imaging center
- Immediate care
- Infectious diseases
- Internal medicine
- Laboratory
- Medical oncology
- Nephrology
- Neurology
- Neurosurgery
- Obstetrics/gynecology
- Ophthalmology
- Optometry
- Orthopaedics
- Otolaryngology
- Pediatrics
- Pharmatrend infusions
- Plastic surgery center
- Pulmonary function lab
- Pulmonary medicine
- Radiation oncology
- Retired physicians
- Rheumatology
- Sleep disorders center
- Spine & pain center
- Travel and tropical medicine services
- Urology
- Vascular lab
- Vascular surgery & endovascular interventions
- Vein center
