= Ruralvale, Georgia =

- unincorporated community
- Location within Georgia
- Coordinates: 34°52′56″N 84°51′50″W
- Country: United States
- State: Georgia
- County: Whitfield
- Time zone: UTC-5 (Eastern (EST))
  - Summer (DST): UTC-4 (EDT)
- ZIP code: 30710
- GNIS feature ID: 353485

Ruralvale is an unincorporated community in Whitfield County, in the U.S. state of Georgia.

== History ==
A variant spelling is "Rural Vale". A post office called Rural Vale was established in 1852, and remained in operation until 1908. The community was descriptively so named on account of its rural location.

== Notable person ==
Malcolm C. Tarver, a U.S. Representative from Georgia from 1927 until 1947, was born at Ruralvale in 1885.
