= Malcolm C. Tarver =

American politician (1885–1960)

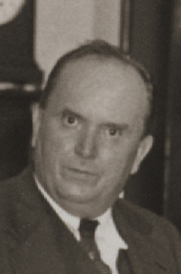

Member of the U.S. House of Representatives from Georgia's 7th district
- In office March 4, 1927 – January 3, 1947
- Preceded by: Gordon Lee
- Succeeded by: Henderson L. Lanham

Personal details
- Born: September 25, 1885 Rural Vale, Georgia
- Died: March 5, 1960 (aged 74) Dalton, Georgia
- Party: Democratic
- Education: Mercer University

Malcolm Connor Tarver (September 25, 1885 – March 5, 1960) was a U.S. representative from Georgia.

Born in Rural Vale, Georgia, Tarver attended the public schools. He was graduated from the law department of Mercer University, Macon, Georgia, in 1904. He was admitted to the bar the same year and commenced practice in Dalton, Georgia. He served as member of the State house of representatives 1909-1912. He served in the State senate in 1913 and 1914. He served as judge of the superior courts, Cherokee Circuit, Georgia from 1917 to 1927.

Tarver was elected as a Democrat to the Seventieth and to the nine succeeding Congresses (March 4, 1927 – January 3, 1947). He was one of the managers appointed by the House of Representatives in 1933 to conduct the impeachment proceedings against Harold Louderback, judge of the United States District Court for the Northern District of California. He was an unsuccessful candidate for renomination in 1946. He resumed the practice of law. He died in Dalton, Georgia, March 5, 1960. He was interred in West Hill Cemetery.

U.S. House of Representatives
Preceded by Gordon Lee	Member of the U.S. House of Representatives from Georgia's 7th congressional district March 4, 1927 – January 3, 1947	Succeeded by Henderson L. Lanham
