= Wrightsboro, Georgia =

Unincorporated community in Georgia, U.S.

Coordinates: 33.550°N 82.569°W

Wrightsboro is an unincorporated community in McDuffie County, in the U.S. state of Georgia. It has an estimated population of 144.

== History ==
The first permanent settlement at Wrightsboro was made in the 1760s by a colony of Quakers. The community was named after James Wright, 7th Governor of Carolina and Georgia. In 1773 William Bartram recorded a brief visit to the town while on a large expedition through South Carolina, Georgia, and Florida. The Georgia General Assembly incorporated Wrightsboro as a town in 1799.

A post office called Wrightsborough was established in 1892, and remained in operation until 1905.

In 1998, the area was listed on the National Register of Historic Places as the Wrightsboro Historic District.

== Notable person ==
Augustus Romaldus Wright, a politician, lawyer, and Confederate war officer was born at Wrightsboro in 1813.
