= Walter L. Bragg =

Walter Lawrence Bragg (February 25, 1838 – August 21, 1891) was an American Democratic politician and government official. He was one of the original commissioners of the Interstate Commerce Commission serving from the Commission's creation in 1887 until his death in 1891.

== Early life ==
Bragg was born in Lowndes County, Alabama on February 25, 1838. The Bragg family moved to Ouachita County, Arkansas in 1844, and Walter grew up there. He graduated from Harvard in 1858. After graduation, he lived in the Ouachita county seat of Camden, Arkansas, where he began the practice of law.

During the American Civil War, Bragg fought on the Confederate side, principally with the Army of Tennessee, rising to the rank of captain. After the war, Bragg settled in Marion, Alabama, moving to the state capital of Montgomery in 1871.

== Political career ==
In 1874, Bragg was elected head of the Democratic State Executive Committee, a post he held for three years. A delegate to the Democratic National Convention in 1876, Bragg was elected as Alabama's representative on the Democratic National Committee. In 1880, he was a presidential elector when the Democrats carried the state.

In March, 1881, he was appointed President of the Alabama Railroad Commission, and was appointed to a second two-year term in March, 1883. When his second term expired, he resumed the practice of law in Montgomery. When the Interstate Commerce Commission was created in 1887, Bragg was appointed by President Grover Cleveland. Bragg was reappointed shortly before Cleveland left office for the first time in 1889.

== Personal life ==
Still suffering from war wounds, Bragg fell into poor health. He died at Avon-by-the-Sea, New Jersey after a two-year illness on August 21, 1891.
