= Hayneville, Georgia =

Unincorporated community in Georgia, U.S.

Coordinates: 32°23′01″N 83°37′15″W

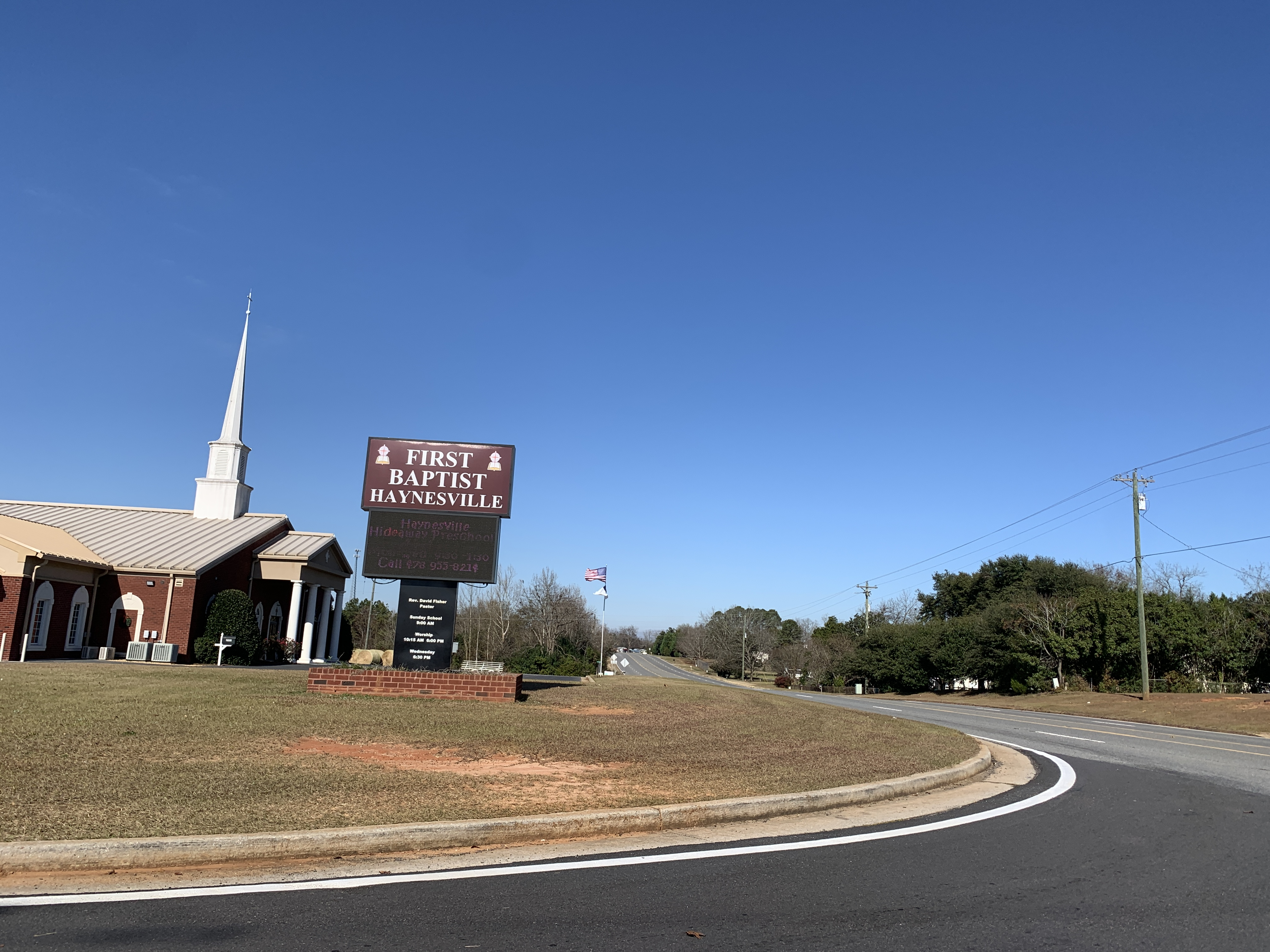
Hayneville

Hayneville (also called Haynesville) is an unincorporated community in Houston County, in the U.S. state of Georgia.

== History ==
A post office called Haynesville was established in 1835, and remained in operation until 1904. The community was named for a pioneer settler with the name Haynes.
