= Nathan Henry Bass Sr. =

Confederate politician

Member of the Provisional Confederate Congress from Georgia
- In office January 14, 1862 – February 17, 1862
- Preceded by: Eugenius Aristides Nisbet
- Succeeded by: Congress dissolved

Personal details
- Born: October 1, 1808 Putnam County, Georgia, U.S.
- Died: September 2, 1890 (aged 81) U.S.
- Party: Democratic

Nathan Henry Bass Sr. (October 1, 1808 – September 22, 1890) was a Confederate politician. He was born in Putnam County, Georgia. He represented the state in the Provisional Confederate Congress from January 14, 1862, to February 17, 1862, replacing Eugenius Aristides Nisbet who had resigned.
