= Robert Battey =

American physician 1828–1895)

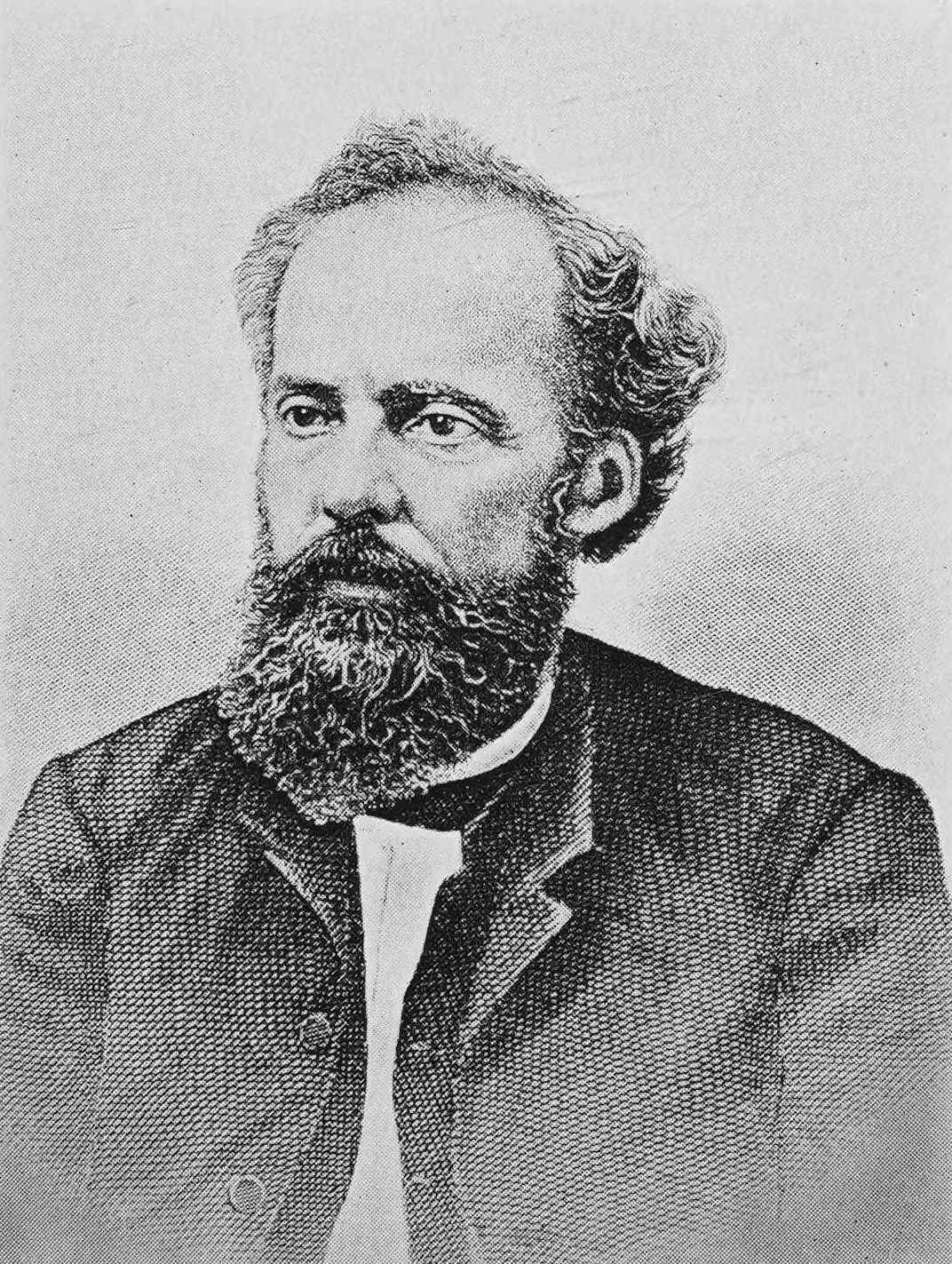
Robert Battey

Robert Battey (November 26, 1828 - November 8, 1895) was an American physician who is known for pioneering a surgical procedure then called Battey's Operation and now termed radical oophorectomy (or removal of a woman's ovaries).

== Biography ==
Robert Battey was born in Augusta, Georgia to Cephas and Mary Agnes Magruder Battey. He was educated in Augusta and at Phillips Academy, Andover, Massachusetts. He graduated from Philadelphia College of Pharmacy in 1856. He went on to take courses at Jefferson Medical College, graduating in 1857. In the same year he studied at the Obstetrical Institute of Philadelphia gaining a diploma from the University of Pennsylvania. In 1859 he toured Ireland and also Great Britain, where he was introduced to the ovariotomist Thomas Spencer Wells.

Battey served four years as a surgeon in the Nineteenth Georgia Volunteer Regiment during the American Civil War. After the Confederate surrender in April 1865, Battey resumed his practice in Rome, Georgia. His field of study was gynecology, and he became well known for a procedure he pioneered to remove a woman's ovaries. Initially referred to as ovariotomy, and named "Battey's Operation" in his honor, it is what today is termed a radical oophorectomy. He performed the first successful oophorectomy in May 1869 when he successfully removed a large dermoid cyst from a physician's wife. On August 27, 1872 he performed his first 'normal' oophorectomy. The patient, Julie Omberg, had diseased ovaries and lived to be 80 years old. There was a lynch mob waiting for Dr. Battey if he failed the operation.

He was instrumental in establishing the Gynecological Infirmary in Rome, Georgia, later enlarged and renamed the Martha Battey Hospital in honor of his wife.

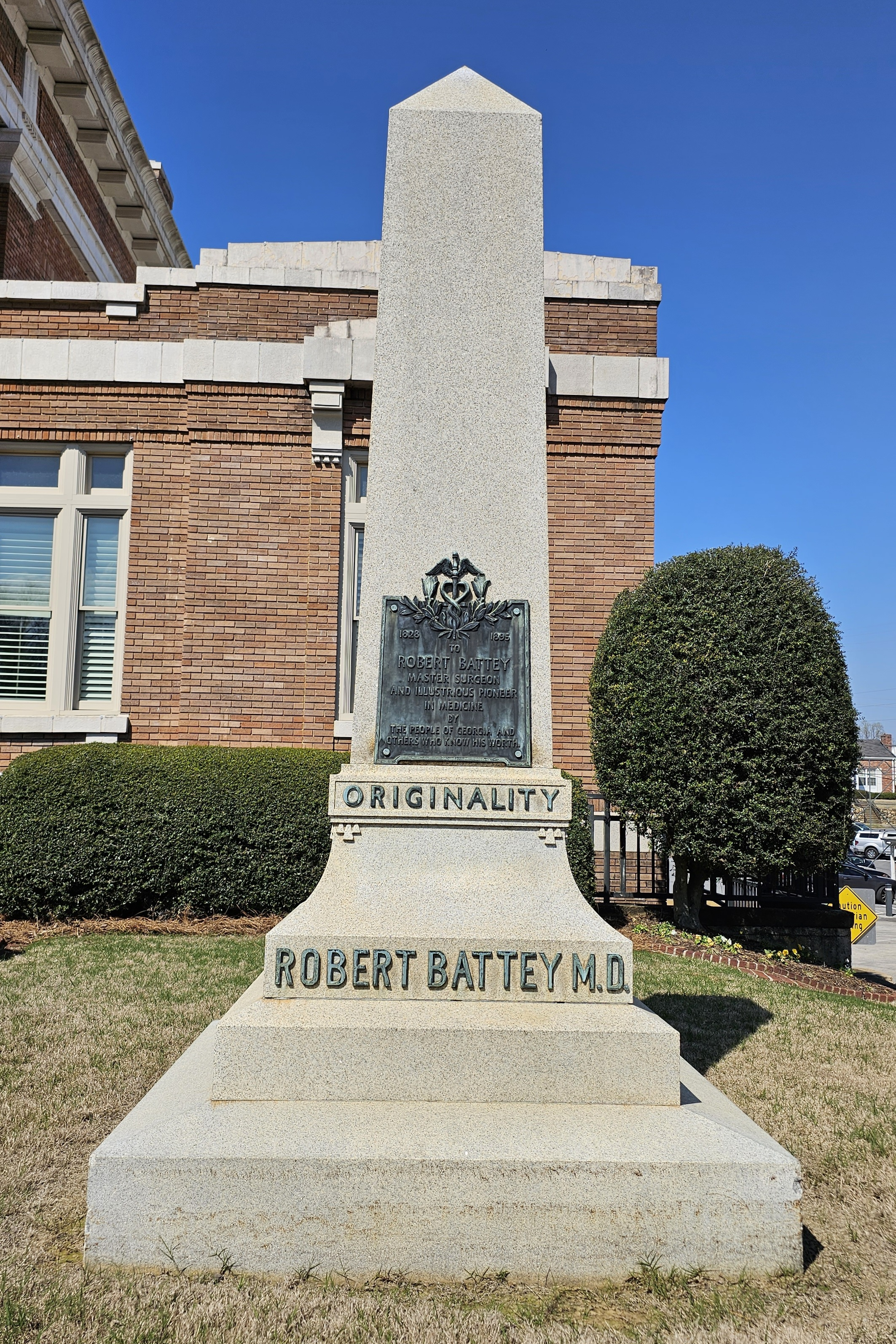
Monument honoring Battey in front of the city hall in Rome, Georgia

In 1873, Battey became a professor of obstetrics at the Atlanta Medical College, where he stayed until 1875. He co-founded the American Gynecological Society in 1876, and was elected president in 1888. He continued to practice medicine until his death on November 8, 1895.

== Controversy ==
During the second half of the 19th century many women were treated using bilateral oophorectomy for conditions recognised today such as amenorrhoea, dysmenorrhoea, menometrorrhagia, and various conditions that were variously referred to at the time as pelvic neurosis, oophoromania, oophoralgia, menstrual molimina (premenstrual syndrome), ovarian epilepsy and sexuologic (nymphomania) disorders. Battey himself is credited by E.P. Becton in 1888 with performing several hundred oophorectomies, and by 1906, following its widespread practice, Van De Warker estimated that 150,000 women had undergone this procedure.

However, mortality following the procedure remained high, even into the late 1870s, and of 35 cases described by Alexander Russell Simpson, 12 women died. Furthermore, debate on the efficacy of oophorectomy remained controversial until the end of the 19th century, when J Whitridge Williams maintained that many of the ovaries he had examined after removal were normal, and that many operations had not been justified. Even Battey himself in 1887 conceded that his more favorable results (9/9) were for ovarian epilepsy, whereas cure rates were only 13/20 and 1/7 for oophoralgia and oophoromania respectively.

Ironically, Thomas Spencer Wells, the ovariotomist Battey had first met in 1859, went on (at a Symposium attended by Battey and Alfred Hagar in 1886) to condemn the practice of surgical castration for mental or nervous diseases, saying "That in nearly all cases of nervous excitement and madness it [oophorectomy] is inadmissible" and "That in nymphomania and mental diseases it [oophorectomy] is, to say the least, unjustifiable". Finally, just 3 years after Battey's own presidency of the society, A Reeves Jackson, the 1891 president of the American Gynecological Society, in a retrospective examination of the first 15 years of the Society's activities "..made a ruthless self-examination of its Fellow's past practices, and a scathing condemnation of their irrational surgical procedures, including Battey's operation...".

The value of the experimental surgery championed by Battey is less that it contributed to an improvement of women's physical, emotional and mental well being, and more that it incidentally helped in the perfection of pelvic surgery and provided clear evidence for the concept that there was an unambiguous relationship between ovarian function and menstruation.

== Medical Association Memberships ==
- American Medical Association
- American Gynecological Society (for further reading see here.)
