= Gore, Georgia =

Gore Mt. Hickory
- Unincorporated community
- Location in Georgia Location in the United States
- Coordinates: 34°27′56″N 85°16′09″W
- Country: United States
- State: Georgia
- County: Chattooga
- Named for: William Gore

Gore is an unincorporated community in Chattooga County, in the U.S. state of Georgia.

== History ==
An early variant name was "Mt. Hickory". William Gore, the first postmaster, gave the community its present name. A post office was established at Gore in 1884, and remained in operation until it was discontinued in 1953.
