= Oophorectomy =

Surgical removal of the ovary or ovaries

- ICD-10-PCS: 0UB00ZX - 0UB28ZZ
- ICD-9-CM: 65.3-65.6
- MeSH: D010052

Oophorectomy or Oöphorectomy (/ˌoʊ.əfəˈrɛktəmi/; from Greek ᾠοφόρος, ōophóros, 'egg-bearing' and ἐκτομή, ektomḗ, 'a cutting out of'), historically also called ovariotomy, is the surgical removal of an ovary or ovaries. The surgery is also called ovariectomy, but this term is mostly used in reference to non-human animals, e.g. the surgical removal of ovaries from laboratory animals. Removal of the ovaries of females is the biological equivalent of castration of males; the term castration is only occasionally used in the medical literature to refer to oophorectomy of women. In veterinary medicine, the removal of ovaries and uterus is called ovariohysterectomy (spaying) and is a form of sterilization.

The first reported successful human oophorectomy was carried out by Sir Sydney Jones at Sydney Infirmary, Australia, in 1870.

Partial oophorectomy or ovariotomy is a term sometimes used to describe a variety of surgeries such as ovarian cyst removal, or resection of parts of the ovaries. This kind of surgery is fertility-preserving, although ovarian failure may be relatively frequent. Most of the long-term risks and consequences of oophorectomy are not or only partially present with partial oophorectomy.

In humans, oophorectomy is most often performed because of diseases such as ovarian cysts or cancer; as prophylaxis to reduce the chances of developing ovarian cancer or breast cancer; or in conjunction with hysterectomy (removal of the uterus). In the 1890s people believed oophorectomies could cure menstrual cramps, back pain, headaches, and chronic coughing, although no evidence existed that the procedure impacted any of these ailments.

The removal of an ovary together with the fallopian tube is called salpingo-oophorectomy or unilateral salpingo-oophorectomy (USO). When both ovaries and both fallopian tubes are removed, the term bilateral salpingo-oophorectomy (BSO) is used. Oophorectomy and salpingo-oophorectomy are not common forms of birth control in humans; more usual is tubal ligation, in which the fallopian tubes are blocked but the ovaries remain intact. In many cases, surgical removal of the ovaries is performed concurrently with a hysterectomy. The formal medical name for removal of a woman's entire reproductive system (ovaries, fallopian tubes, uterus) is "total abdominal hysterectomy with bilateral salpingo-oophorectomy" (TAH-BSO); the more casual term for such a surgery is "ovariohysterectomy". "Hysterectomy" is removal of the uterus (from the Greek ὑστέρα hystera "womb" and εκτομία ektomia "a cutting out of") without removal of the ovaries or fallopian tubes.

Oophorectomy is used as part of castration to punish some female sex offenders.

== Technique ==
Oophorectomy for benign causes is most often performed by abdominal laparoscopy. Abdominal laparotomy or robotic surgery is used in complicated cases or when a malignancy is suspected.

== Statistics ==
According to the Centers for Disease Control, 454,000 women in the United States underwent oophorectomy in 2004. The first successful operation of this type, account of which was published in the Eclectic Repertory and Analytic Review (Philadelphia) in 1817, was performed by Ephraim McDowell (1771–1830), a surgeon from Danville, Kentucky. McDowell was dubbed as the "father of ovariotomy". It later became known as Battey's Operation, after Robert Battey, a surgeon from Augusta, Georgia, who championed the procedure for a variety of conditions, most successfully for ovarian epilepsy.

== Indication ==
Most bilateral oophorectomies (63%) are performed without any medical indication, and most (87%) are performed together with a hysterectomy. Conversely, unilateral oophorectomy is commonly performed for a medical indication (73%; cyst, endometriosis, benign tumor, inflammation, etc.) and less commonly in conjunction with hysterectomy (61%).

Special indications include several groups of women with substantially increased risk of ovarian cancer, such as high-risk BRCA mutation carriers and women with endometriosis who also have frequent ovarian cysts.

Bilateral oophorectomy has been traditionally done in the belief that the benefit of preventing ovarian cancer would outweigh the risks associated with removal of ovaries. However, it is now clear that prophylactic oophorectomy without a reasonable medical indication decreases long-term survival rates substantially and has deleterious long-term effects on health and well-being even in post-menopausal women. The procedure has been postulated as a possible treatment method for female sex offenders.

The procedure is sometimes performed at the same time as hysterectomy in transgender men and non-binary people. The long term effects of oophorectomy in this population are not well studied.

=== Cancer prevention ===
Oophorectomy can significantly improve survival for women with high-risk BRCA mutations, for whom prophylactic oophorectomy around age 40 reduces the risk of ovarian and breast cancer and provides significant and substantial long-term survival advantage. On average, earlier intervention does not provide any additional benefit but increases risks and adverse effects.

For women with high-risk BRCA2 mutations, oophorectomy around age 40 has a relatively modest benefit for survival; the positive effect of reduced breast and ovarian cancer risk is nearly balanced by adverse effects. The survival advantage is more substantial when oophorectomy is performed together with prophylactic mastectomy.

The risks and benefits associated with oophorectomy in the BRCA1/2 mutation carrier population are different than those for the general population. Prophylactic risk-reducing salpingo-oophorectomy (RRSO) is an important option for the high-risk population to consider. Women with BRCA1/2 mutations who undergo salpingo-oophorectomy have lower all-cause mortality rates than women in the same population who do not undergo this procedure. In addition, RRSO has been shown to decrease mortality specific to breast cancer and ovarian cancer. Women who undergo RRSO are also at a lower risk for developing ovarian cancer and first occurrence breast cancer. Specifically, RRSO provides BRCA1 mutation carriers with no prior breast cancer a 70% reduction of ovarian cancer risk. BRCA1 mutation carriers with prior breast cancer can benefit from an 85% reduction. High-risk women who have not had prior breast cancer can benefit from a 37% (BRCA1 mutation) and 64% (BRCA2 mutation) reduction of breast cancer risk. These benefits are important to highlight, as they are unique to this BRCA1/2 mutation carrier population.

=== Endometriosis ===
In rare cases, oophorectomy can be used to treat endometriosis by eliminating the menstrual cycle, which will reduce or eliminate the spread of existing endometriosis as well as reducing pain. Since endometriosis results from an overgrowth of the uterine lining, removal of the ovaries as a treatment for endometriosis is often done in conjunction with a hysterectomy to further reduce or eliminate recurrence.

Oophorectomy for endometriosis is used only as last resort, often in conjunction with a hysterectomy, as it has severe side effects for women of reproductive age. However, it has a higher success rate than retaining the ovaries.

Partial oophorectomy (i.e., ovarian cyst removal not involving total oophorectomy) is often used to treat milder cases of endometriosis when non-surgical hormonal treatments fail to stop cyst formation. Removal of ovarian cysts through partial oophorectomy is also used to treat extreme pelvic pain from chronic hormonal-related pelvic problems.

== Risks and adverse effects ==
=== Surgical risks ===
Oophorectomy is an intra-abdominal surgery and serious complications stemming directly from the surgery are rare. When performed together with hysterectomy, it has influence on choice of surgical technique as the combined surgery is much less likely to be performed by vaginal hysterectomy.

Laparotomic adnexal surgeries are associated with a high rate of adhesive small bowel obstructions (24%).

An infrequent complication is injuring of the ureter at the level of the suspensory ligament of the ovary.

=== Long-term effects ===
Oophorectomy has serious long-term consequences stemming mostly from the hormonal effects of the surgery and extending well beyond menopause. The reported risks and adverse effects include premature death, cardiovascular disease, cognitive impairment or dementia, parkinsonism, osteoporosis and bone fractures, decline in psychological well-being, and decline in sexual function. Hormone replacement therapy does not always reduce the adverse effects.

=== Mortality ===
Oophorectomy is associated with significantly increased all-cause long-term mortality except when performed for cancer prevention in carriers of high-risk BRCA mutations. This effect is particularly pronounced for women who undergo oophorectomy before age 45.

The effect is not limited to women who have oophorectomy performed before menopause; an impact on survival is expected even for surgeries performed up to the age of 65. Surgery at age 50-54 reduces the probability of survival until age 80 by 8% (from 62% to 54% survival), surgery at age 55-59 by 4%. Most of this effect is due to excess cardiovascular risk and hip fractures.

Removal of ovaries causes hormonal changes and symptoms similar to, but generally more severe than, menopause. Women who have had an oophorectomy are usually encouraged to take hormone replacement drugs to prevent other conditions often associated with menopause. Women younger than 45 who have had their ovaries removed with prophylactic bilateral oophorectomy face a mortality risk 170% higher than women who have retained their ovaries. Retaining the ovaries when a hysterectomy is performed is associated with better long-term survival. Hormone therapy for women with oophorectomies performed before age 45 improves the long-term outcome and all-cause mortality rates.

=== Menopausal effects ===
Women who have had bilateral oophorectomy surgeries lose most of their ability to produce the hormones estrogen and progesterone, and lose about half of their ability to produce testosterone, and subsequently enter what is known as "surgical menopause" (as opposed to normal menopause, which occurs naturally in women as part of the aging process). In natural menopause the ovaries generally continue to produce low levels of hormones, especially androgens, long after menopause, which may explain why surgical menopause is generally accompanied by a more sudden and severe onset of symptoms than natural menopause, symptoms that may continue until the natural age of menopause. These symptoms are commonly addressed through hormone therapy, utilizing various forms of estrogen, testosterone, progesterone, or a combination.

=== Cardiovascular risk ===
When the ovaries are removed, a woman is at a seven times greater risk of cardiovascular disease, but the mechanisms are not precisely known. The hormone production of the ovaries currently cannot be sufficiently mimicked by drug therapy. The ovaries produce hormones a woman needs throughout her entire life, in the quantity they are needed, at the time they are needed, in response to and as part of the complex endocrine system.

=== Osteoporosis ===
Oophorectomy is associated with an increased risk of osteoporosis and bone fractures. A potential risk for oophorectomy performed after menopause is not fully elucidated. Reduced levels of testosterone in women is predictive of height loss, which may occur as a result of reduced bone density. In women under the age of 50 who have undergone oophorectomy, hormone replacement therapy (HRT) is often used to offset the negative effects of sudden hormonal loss such as early-onset osteoporosis as well as menopausal problems like hot flashes that are usually more severe than those experienced by women undergoing natural menopause.

=== Adverse effect on sexuality ===
Oophorectomy substantially impairs sexuality. Substantially more women who had both an oophorectomy and a hysterectomy reported libido loss, difficulty with sexual arousal, and vaginal dryness than those who had a less invasive procedure (either hysterectomy alone or an alternative procedure), and hormone replacement therapy was not found to improve these symptoms. In addition, oophorectomy greatly reduces testosterone levels, which are associated with a greater sense of sexual desire in women. However, at least one study has shown that psychological factors, such as relationship satisfaction, are still the best predictor of sexual activity following oophorectomy. Sexual intercourse remains possible after oophorectomy and coitus can continue. Reconstructive surgery remains an option for women who have experienced benign and malignant conditions.

== Managing side effects of prophylactic oophorectomy ==
=== Non-hormonal treatments ===
The side effects of oophorectomy may be alleviated by medicines other than hormonal replacement. Non-hormonal biphosphonates (such as Fosamax and Actonel) increase bone strength and are available as once-a-week pills. Low-dose selective serotonin reuptake inhibitors such as Paxil and Prozac alleviate vasomotor menopausal symptoms, i.e., "hot flashes".

=== Hormonal treatments ===
In general, hormone replacement therapy is somewhat controversial due to the known carcinogenic and thrombogenic properties of estrogen; however, many physicians and patients feel the benefits outweigh the risks in women who may face serious health and quality-of-life issues as a consequence of early surgical menopause. The ovarian hormones estrogen, progesterone, and testosterone are involved in the regulation of hundreds of bodily functions; it is believed by some doctors that hormone therapy programs mitigate surgical menopause side effects such as increased risk of cardiovascular disease, and female sexual dysfunction.

Short-term hormone replacement with estrogen has negligible effect on overall mortality for high-risk BRCA mutation carriers. Based on computer simulations, overall mortality appears to be marginally higher for short-term HRT after oophorectomy or marginally lower for short-term HRT after oophorectomy in combination with mastectomy. This result can probably be generalized to other women at high risk in whom short-term (i.e., one- or two-year) treatment with estrogen for hot flashes may be acceptable.

== See also ==
- Ovarian cysts
- Tubal ligation
- Birth control
- Hysterectomy
- Hormone replacement therapy (menopause)
- Orchiectomy (removal of testicles)
- Estrogen deprivation therapy
- List of surgeries by type
