= Georgia's 5th congressional district =

U.S. House district for Georgia

Coordinates: 33°42′25″N 84°24′04″W

- Interactive map of district boundaries since January 3, 2025
- Representative: Nikema Williams; D–Atlanta
- Distribution: 99.97% urban; 0.03% rural
- Population (2025): 780,499
- Median household income: $79,529
- Ethnicity: 49.8% Black; 31.0% White; 9.9% Hispanic; 5.1% Asian; 3.5% Two or more races; 0.8% other
- Cook PVI: D+36

Georgia's 5th congressional district is a congressional district in the U.S. state of Georgia. The district was represented by Democrat John Lewis from January 3, 1987, until his death on July 17, 2020. Kwanza Hall was elected to replace Lewis on December 1, 2020, in a special election for the balance of Lewis' 17th term. He chose not to run in the general election for a full two-year term. Hall served until January 3, 2021, when Nikema Williams won election.

== Reapportionment ==
The district's boundaries were redrawn following the 2010 census, which granted an additional congressional seat to Georgia. The first election using the new district boundaries (listed below) were the 2012 congressional elections.

=== Geography ===
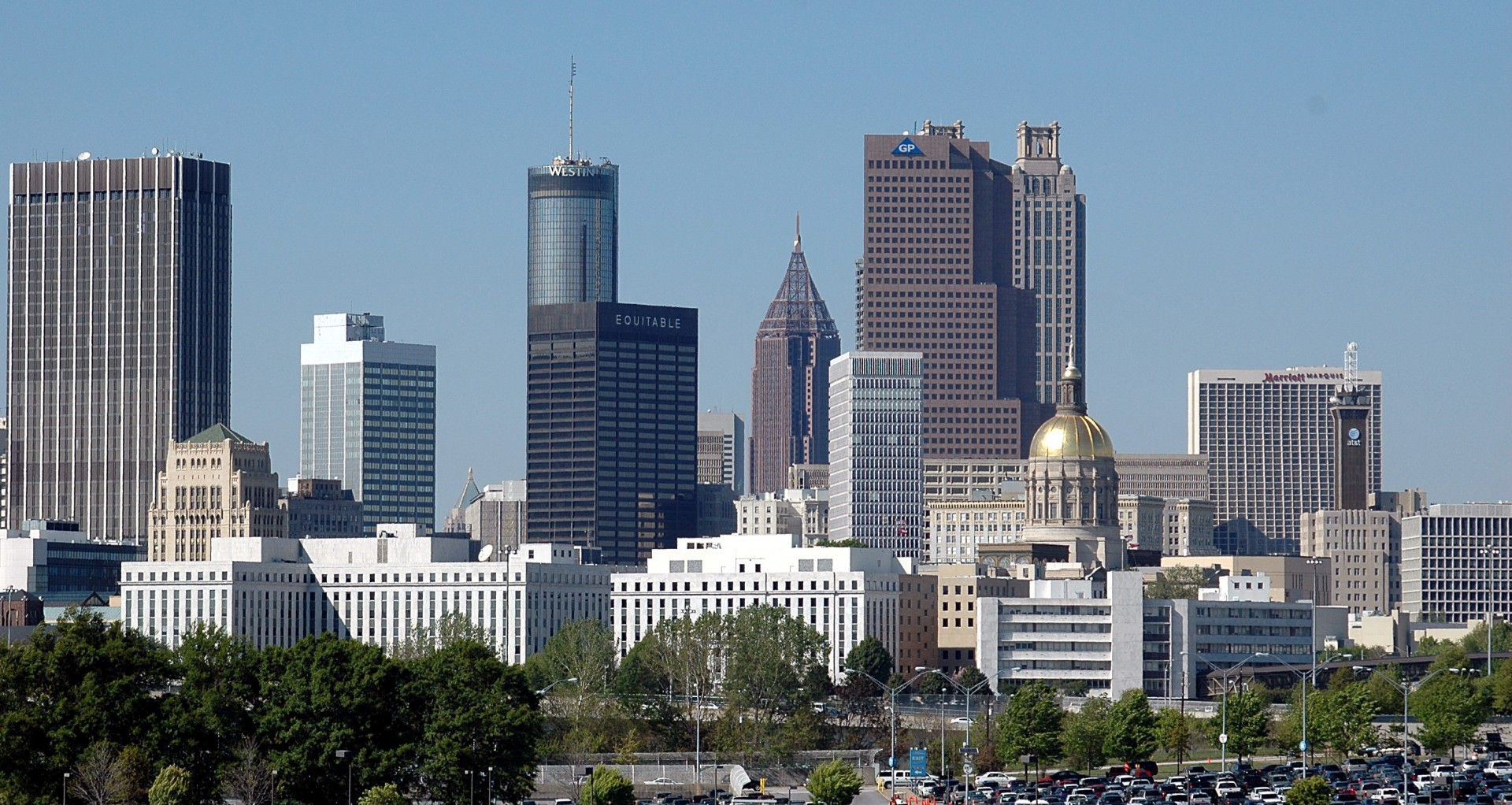
Atlanta, the state's largest city, contains most of the district's population.

Based in central Fulton and parts of DeKalb and Clayton counties, the majority black district includes almost three-fourths of Atlanta, the state capital and largest city. It also includes some of the surrounding suburbs, including East Point, Druid Hills, and Forest Park. With a Cook Partisan Voting Index rating of D+32, it is the most Democratic district in Georgia.

== Composition ==
For the 119th and successive Congresses (based on the districts drawn following a 2023 court order), the district contains all or portions of the following counties and communities.

Clayton County (6)

College Park (part; also 6th; shared with Fulton County), Conley, Forest Park, Lake City, Morrow, Riverdale

DeKalb County (12)

Atlanta (part; also 6th; shared with Fulton County), Avondale Estates, Belvedere Park (part; also 4th), Brookhaven (part; also 4th), Candler-McAfee (part; also 4th), Decatur, Druid Hills, Gresham Park, North Decatur, North Druid Hills, Scottdale (part; also 4th), Tucker (part; also 4th)

Fulton County (4)

Atlanta (part; also 6th; shared with DeKalb County), College Park (part; also 6th; shared with Clayton County), East Point (part; also 6th), Hapeville

== Recent election results from statewide races ==
Year	Office	Results
2008	President	Obama 84% - 16%
2012	President	Obama 83% - 17%
2016	President	Clinton 84% - 13%
2016	Senate	Barksdale 75% - 20%
2018	Governor	Abrams 87% - 12%
2018	Lt. Governor	Riggs Amico 86% - 14%
2018	Attorney General	Bailey 85% - 15%
2020	President	Biden 86% - 13%
2021	Senate (Reg.)	Ossoff 86% - 14%
2021	Senate (Spec.)	Warnock 87% - 13%
2022	Senate	Warnock 90% - 10%
2022	Governor	Abrams 85% - 15%
2022	Lt. Governor	Bailey 85% - 13%
2022	Secretary of State	Nguyen 81% - 17%
2022	Attorney General	Jordan 84% - 14%
2024	President	Harris 85% - 14%

== List of members representing the district ==
Member	Party	Years	Cong ress	Electoral history	District map
District created March 4, 1827
Charles Eaton Haynes (Sparta)	Jacksonian	March 4, 1827 – March 3, 1829	20th	Redistricted from the at-large district and re-elected in 1826. Redistricted to the at-large district.	
District inactive		March 4, 1829 – March 3, 1845			
John Henry Lumpkin (Rome)	Democratic	March 4, 1845 – March 3, 1849	29th 30th	Elected in 1844. Re-elected in 1846. [data missing]	
Thomas C. Hackett (Rome)	Democratic	March 4, 1849 – March 3, 1851	31st	Elected in 1848. [data missing]	
Elijah Webb Chastain (Toccoa)	Constitutional Union	March 4, 1851 – March 3, 1853	32nd 33rd	Elected in 1851. Re-elected in 1853. [data missing]	
Elijah Webb Chastain (Toccoa)	Democratic	March 4, 1853 – March 3, 1855	32nd 33rd	Elected in 1851. Re-elected in 1853. [data missing]	
John Henry Lumpkin (Rome)	Democratic	March 4, 1855 – March 3, 1857	34th	Elected in 1855. [data missing]	
Augustus R. Wright (Rome)	Democratic	March 4, 1857 – March 3, 1859	35th	Elected in 1857. [data missing]	
John William; Henderson Underwood (Rome)	Democratic	March 4, 1859 – January 23, 1861	36th	Elected in 1859. Withdrew.	
Vacant		January 23, 1861 – July 25, 1868	36th 37th 38th 39th 40th	Civil War and Reconstruction	
Charles H. Prince (Augusta)	Republican	July 25, 1868 – March 3, 1869	40th	Elected to finish the term. [data missing]	
Vacant		March 4, 1869 – December 22, 1870	41st		
Stephen A. Corker (Waynesboro)	Democratic	December 22, 1870 – March 3, 1871	41st	Elected after the disqualification of Charles H. Prince. [data missing]	
Dudley M. DuBose (Washington)	Democratic	March 4, 1871 – March 3, 1873	42nd	Elected in 1870. [data missing]	
James C. Freeman (Griffin)	Republican	March 4, 1873 – March 3, 1875	43rd	Elected in 1872. [data missing]	
Milton A. Candler (Atlanta)	Democratic	March 4, 1875 – March 3, 1879	44th 45th	Elected in 1874. Re-elected in 1876. [data missing]	
Nathaniel J. Hammond (Atlanta)	Democratic	March 4, 1879 – March 3, 1887	46th 47th 48th 49th	Elected in 1878. Re-elected in 1880. Re-elected in 1882. Re-elected in 1884. [data missing]	
John D. Stewart (Griffin)	Democratic	March 4, 1887 – March 3, 1891	50th 51st	Elected in 1886. Re-elected in 1888. [data missing]	
Leonidas F. Livingston (Covington)	Democratic	March 4, 1891 – March 3, 1911	52nd 53rd 54th 55th 56th 57th 58th 59th 60th 61st	Elected in 1890. Re-elected in 1892. Re-elected in 1894. Re-elected in 1896. Re-elected in 1898. Re-elected in 1900. Re-elected in 1902. Re-elected in 1904. Re-elected in 1906. Re-elected in 1908. [data missing]	
William S. Howard (Kirkwood)	Democratic	March 4, 1911 – March 3, 1919	62nd 63rd 64th 65th	Elected in 1910. Re-elected in 1912. Re-elected in 1914. Re-elected in 1916. [data missing]	
William David Upshaw (Atlanta)	Democratic	March 4, 1919 – March 3, 1927	66th 67th 68th 69th	Elected in 1918. Re-elected in 1920. Re-elected in 1922. Re-elected in 1924. Lost renomination.	
Leslie Jasper Steele (Decatur)	Democratic	March 4, 1927 – July 24, 1929	70th 71st	Elected in 1926. Re-elected in 1928. Died.	
Vacant		July 24, 1929 – October 2, 1929	71st		
Robert Ramspeck (Atlanta)	Democratic	October 2, 1929 – December 31, 1945	71st 72nd 73rd 74th 75th 76th 77th 78th 79th	Elected to finish Steele's term. Re-elected in 1930. Re-elected in 1932. Re-elected in 1934. Re-elected in 1936. Re-elected in 1938. Re-elected in 1940. Re-elected in 1942. Re-elected in 1944. Resigned to return to working in the aviation industry.	
Vacant		December 31, 1945 – February 12, 1946	79th		
Helen Douglas Mankin (Atlanta)	Democratic	February 12, 1946 – January 3, 1947	79th	Elected to finish Ramspeck's term. Lost renomination, and then lost re-election as a write-in candidate.	
James C. Davis (Stone Mountain)	Democratic	January 3, 1947 – January 3, 1963	80th 81st 82nd 83rd 84th 85th 86th 87th	Elected in 1946. Re-elected in 1948. Re-elected in 1950. Re-elected in 1952. Re-elected in 1954. Re-elected in 1956. Re-elected in 1958. Re-elected in 1960. Lost renomination.	
Charles L. Weltner (Atlanta)	Democratic	January 3, 1963 – January 3, 1967	88th 89th	Elected in 1962. Re-elected in 1964. Retired after refusing to endorse Lester Maddox for Governor of Georgia.	
Fletcher Thompson (East Point)	Republican	January 3, 1967 – January 3, 1973	90th 91st 92nd	Elected in 1966. Re-elected in 1968. Re-elected in 1970. Retired to run for U.S. senator.	
Andrew Young (Atlanta)	Democratic	January 3, 1973 – January 29, 1977	93rd 94th 95th	Elected in 1972. Re-elected in 1974. Re-elected in 1976. Resigned to become U.S. Ambassador to the United Nations.	
Vacant		January 29, 1977 – April 6, 1977	95th		
Wyche Fowler (Atlanta)	Democratic	April 6, 1977 – January 3, 1987	95th 96th 97th 98th 99th	Elected to finish Young's term. Re-elected in 1978. Re-elected in 1980. Re-elected in 1982. Re-elected in 1984. Retired to run for U.S. senator.	
John Lewis (Atlanta)	Democratic	January 3, 1987 – July 17, 2020	100th 101st 102nd 103rd 104th 105th 106th 107th 108th 109th 110th 111th 112th 113th 114th 115th 116th	Elected in 1986. Re-elected in 1988. Re-elected in 1990. Re-elected in 1992. Re-elected in 1994. Re-elected in 1996. Re-elected in 1998. Re-elected in 2000. Re-elected in 2002. Re-elected in 2004. Re-elected in 2006. Re-elected in 2008. Re-elected in 2010. Re-elected in 2012. Re-elected in 2014. Re-elected in 2016. Re-elected in 2018. Ran for re-election, but died.	
John Lewis (Atlanta)	Democratic	January 3, 1987 – July 17, 2020	100th 101st 102nd 103rd 104th 105th 106th 107th 108th 109th 110th 111th 112th 113th 114th 115th 116th	Elected in 1986. Re-elected in 1988. Re-elected in 1990. Re-elected in 1992. Re-elected in 1994. Re-elected in 1996. Re-elected in 1998. Re-elected in 2000. Re-elected in 2002. Re-elected in 2004. Re-elected in 2006. Re-elected in 2008. Re-elected in 2010. Re-elected in 2012. Re-elected in 2014. Re-elected in 2016. Re-elected in 2018. Ran for re-election, but died.	2003–2007
John Lewis (Atlanta)	Democratic	January 3, 1987 – July 17, 2020	100th 101st 102nd 103rd 104th 105th 106th 107th 108th 109th 110th 111th 112th 113th 114th 115th 116th	Elected in 1986. Re-elected in 1988. Re-elected in 1990. Re-elected in 1992. Re-elected in 1994. Re-elected in 1996. Re-elected in 1998. Re-elected in 2000. Re-elected in 2002. Re-elected in 2004. Re-elected in 2006. Re-elected in 2008. Re-elected in 2010. Re-elected in 2012. Re-elected in 2014. Re-elected in 2016. Re-elected in 2018. Ran for re-election, but died.	2007–2013
John Lewis (Atlanta)	Democratic	January 3, 1987 – July 17, 2020	100th 101st 102nd 103rd 104th 105th 106th 107th 108th 109th 110th 111th 112th 113th 114th 115th 116th	Elected in 1986. Re-elected in 1988. Re-elected in 1990. Re-elected in 1992. Re-elected in 1994. Re-elected in 1996. Re-elected in 1998. Re-elected in 2000. Re-elected in 2002. Re-elected in 2004. Re-elected in 2006. Re-elected in 2008. Re-elected in 2010. Re-elected in 2012. Re-elected in 2014. Re-elected in 2016. Re-elected in 2018. Ran for re-election, but died.	2013–2023
Vacant		July 17, 2020 – December 3, 2020	116th		2013–2023
Kwanza Hall (Atlanta)	Democratic	December 3, 2020 – January 3, 2021	116th	Elected to finish Lewis's term. Was not a candidate for the next term.	2013–2023
Nikema Williams (Atlanta)	Democratic	January 3, 2021 – present	117th 118th 119th	Elected in 2020. Re-elected in 2022. Re-elected in 2024. Re-elected in 2026.	2013–2023
Nikema Williams (Atlanta)	Democratic	January 3, 2021 – present	117th 118th 119th	Elected in 2020. Re-elected in 2022. Re-elected in 2024. Re-elected in 2026.	2023–2025
Nikema Williams (Atlanta)	Democratic	January 3, 2021 – present	117th 118th 119th	Elected in 2020. Re-elected in 2022. Re-elected in 2024. Re-elected in 2026.	2025–present

== Election results ==
Year	Candidate	Party	Votes	%
1844 (29th Congress)	✓ John Henry Lumpkin	Democratic	7,720	61.2
1844 (29th Congress)	Miller	Whig	4,889	38.8
1846 (30th Congress)	✓ John Henry Lumpkin	Democratic	5,349	79.4
1846 (30th Congress)	Crook	Whig	1,263	18.8
1848 (35th Congress)	✓ Thomas C. Hackett	Democratic	8,767	59.8
1848 (35th Congress)	James M. Calhoun	Whig	5,904	40.2
1851 (32nd Congress)	✓ Elijah Webb Chastain	Union	13,882	65.0
1851 (32nd Congress)	Stiles	Whig	7,481	35.0
1853 (33rd Congress)	✓ Elijah Webb Chastain	Democratic	8,118	50.8
1853 (33rd Congress)	Tumlin	Democratic	7,866	49.2
1855 (34th Congress)	✓ John Henry Lumpkin	Democratic	11,290	58.6
1855 (34th Congress)	Tumlin		7,978	41.4
1857 (35th Congress)	✓ Augustus R. Wright	Democratic	9,669	63.0
1857 (35th Congress)	Hooper	Independent Democrat	5,690	37.1
1859 (36th Congress)	✓ John Underwood	Democratic	12,339	85.1
1859 (36th Congress)	Shackleford	Opp.	2,162	14.9
Georgia announced its secession from the Union, January 28, 1861.
April 20, 1868 (40th Congress); Special election	✓ Charles H. Prince	Republican		
April 20, 1868 (40th Congress); Special election	Hilliard	Democratic		
January 1871 (45th Congress); Special election	✓ Stephen Alfestus Corker	Democratic		
1870 (42nd Congress)	✓ Dudley M. Du Bose	Democratic	15,363	62.3
1870 (42nd Congress)	Isham S. Fannin	Republican	9,302	37.7
1872 (43rd Congress)	✓ James C. Freeman	Republican	10,910	50.7
1872 (43rd Congress)	Glenn	Liberal Republican	10,631	49.4
1874 (44th Congress)	✓ Milton A. Candler	Democratic	12,450	66.5
1874 (44th Congress)	Mills	Republican	6,273	33.5
1876 (45th Congress)	✓ Milton A. Candler	Democratic	18,083	67.5
1876 (45th Congress)	Markham	Republican	8,714	32.5
1878 (46th Congress)	✓ Nathaniel Job Hammond	Democratic	10,269	55.6
1878 (46th Congress)	Arnold	Greenback	8,196	44.4
1880 (47th Congress)	✓ Nathaniel Job Hammond	Democratic	11,947	62.6
1880 (47th Congress)	Clark	Republican	7,133	37.4
1882 (48th Congress)	✓ Nathaniel Job Hammond	Democratic	10,788	65.2
1882 (48th Congress)	Buck	Independent Republican	5,756	34.8
1884 (49th Congress)	✓ Nathaniel Job Hammond	Democratic	9,008	63.7
1884 (49th Congress)	Martin	Republican	5,130	36.3
1886 (50th Congress)	✓ John D. Stewart	Democratic	2,999	100.0
1888 (55th Congress)	✓ John D. Stewart	Democratic	10,971	68.6
1888 (55th Congress)	George S. Thomas	Republican	5,032	31.4
1890 (52nd Congress)	✓ Leonidas F. Livingston	Democratic	8,688	70.7
1890 (52nd Congress)	Will Haight	Republican	3,608	29.3
1892 (53rd Congress)	✓ Leonidas F. Livingston	Democratic	9,732	60.2
1892 (53rd Congress)	Samuel Small	Populist & Republican	6,447	39.9
1894 (54th Congress)	✓ Leonidas F. Livingston	Democratic	7,781	59.7
1894 (54th Congress)	Robert Todd	Populist	5,264	40.4
1896 (55th Congress)	✓ Leonidas F. Livingston	Democratic	9,258	58.0
1896 (55th Congress)	J. C. Hendrix	Republican	6,715	42.0
1898 (56th Congress)	✓ Leonidas F. Livingston	Democratic	3,027	97.6
1900 (57th Congress)	✓ Leonidas F. Livingston	Democratic	8,828	76.6
1900 (57th Congress)	Charles I. Brannan	Independent	2,685	23.3
1902 (58th Congress)	✓ Leonidas F. Livingston	Democratic	2,485	100.0
1904 (59th Congress)	✓ Leonidas F. Livingston	Democratic	9,387	71.4
1904 (59th Congress)	C. P. Goree	Republican	3,760	28.6
1906 (60th Congress)	✓ Leonidas F. Livingston	Democratic	3,030	100.0
1908 (65th Congress)	✓ Leonidas F. Livingston	Democratic	8,909	100.0
1910 (62nd Congress)	✓ William Schley Howard	Democratic	4,091	100.0
1912 (63rd Congress)	✓ William Schley Howard	Democratic	12,000	100.0
1914 (64th Congress)	✓ William Schley Howard	Democratic	4,780	88.2
1914 (64th Congress)	Dewar	Progressive	640	11.8
1916 (65th Congress)	✓ William Schley Howard	Democratic	13,174	88.8
1916 (65th Congress)	Moore		1,656	11.2
1918 (66th Congress)	✓ William D. Upshaw	Democratic	5,251	100.0
1920 (67th Congress)	✓ William D. Upshaw	Democratic	10,649	70.1
1920 (67th Congress)	John W. Martin	Republican	4,544	29.9
1922 (68th Congress)	✓ William D. Upshaw	Democratic	4,646	93.1
1922 (68th Congress)	Max H. Wilensky		347	7.0
1924 (69th Congress)	✓ William D. Upshaw	Democratic	16,608	100.0
1926 (70th Congress)	✓ Leslie J. Steele	Democratic	2,919	99.9
1928 (75th Congress)	✓ Leslie J. Steele	Democratic	19,328	100.0
October 2, 1929 (75th Congress); Special election	✓ Robert Ramspeck	Democratic		
1930 (72nd Congress)	✓ Robert Ramspeck	Democratic	10,752	100.0
1932 (73rd Congress)	✓ Robert Ramspeck	Democratic	26,657	100.0
1934 (74th Congress)	✓ Robert Ramspeck	Democratic	5,206	100.0
1936 (75th Congress)	✓ Robert Ramspeck	Democratic	35,540	89.4
1936 (75th Congress)	H. H. Alexander	Republican	4,213	10.6
1938 (76th Congress)	✓ Robert Ramspeck	Democratic	6,906	97.2
1940 (77th Congress)	✓ Robert Ramspeck	Democratic, Independent	41,677	99.9
1942 (78th Congress)	✓ Robert Ramspeck	Democratic	9,176	96.0
1944 (79th Congress)	✓ Robert Ramspeck	Democratic	50,257	94.5
1944 (79th Congress)	H. H. Alexander	Independent	2,929	5.5
February 12, 1946 (79th Congress); Special election	✓ Helen Douglas Mankin	Democratic		
1946 (80th Congress)	✓ James C. Davis	Democratic	31,444	61.6
1946 (80th Congress)	Helen Douglas Mankin	Independent (Write-in)	19,527	38.3
1948 (81st Congress)	✓ James C. Davis	Democratic	54,637	99.6
1950 (82nd Congress)	✓ James C. Davis	Democratic	49,317	100.0
1952 (83rd Congress)	✓ James C. Davis	Democratic	83,920	100.0
1954 (84th Congress)	✓ James C. Davis	Democratic	54,069	64.4
1954 (84th Congress)	Charles A. Moye Jr.	Republican	29,911	35.6
1956 (85th Congress)	✓ James C. Davis	Democratic	85,292	59.2
1956 (85th Congress)	Randolph W. Thrower	Republican	58,777	40.8
1958 (86th Congress)	✓ James C. Davis	Democratic	32,135	100.0
1960 (87th Congress)	✓ James C. Davis	Democratic	80,023	99.7
1962 (88th Congress)	✓ Charles Weltner	Democratic	60,583	55.6
1962 (88th Congress)	L. J. O'Callaghan	Republican	48,466	44.4
1964 (89th Congress)	✓ Charles Weltner	Democratic	65,803	54.0
1964 (89th Congress)	L. J. O'Callaghan	Republican	55,983	46.0
1966 (90th Congress)	✓ Fletcher Thompson	Republican	55,423	60.1
1966 (90th Congress)	Archie Lindsey	Democratic	36,751	39.9
1968 (95th Congress)	✓ Fletcher Thompson	Republican	79,258	55.6
1968 (95th Congress)	Charles Weltner	Democratic	63,183	44.4
1970 (92nd Congress)	✓ Fletcher Thompson	Republican	78,540	57.4
1970 (92nd Congress)	Andrew Young	Democratic	58,394	42.6
1972 (93rd Congress)	✓ Andrew Young	Democratic	72,289	52.8
1972 (93rd Congress)	Rodney M. Cook	Republican	64,495	47.1
1974 (94th Congress)	✓ Andrew Young	Democratic	69,221	71.6
1974 (94th Congress)	Wyman C. Lowe	Republican	27,397	28.3
1976 (95th Congress)	✓ Andrew Young	Democratic	96,056	66.7
1976 (95th Congress)	Ed Gadrix	Republican	47,998	33.3
1977 (95th Congress); Special election	Wyche Fowler	Democratic	29,898	39.6
1977 (95th Congress); Special election	John Lewis	Democratic	21,531	28.6
1977 (95th Congress); Special election	Paul Coverdell	Republican	16,509	21.9
April 5, 1977 (95th Congress); Special runoff	✓ Wyche Fowler	Democratic	54,378	62.4
April 5, 1977 (95th Congress); Special runoff	John Lewis	Democratic	32,732	37.6
1978 (96th Congress)	✓ Wyche Fowler	Democratic	52,739	75.5
1978 (96th Congress)	Thomas P. Bowles Jr.	Republican	17,132	24.5
1980 (97th Congress)	✓ Wyche Fowler	Democratic	101,646	74.0
1980 (97th Congress)	F. William Dowda	Republican	35,640	26.0
1982 (98th Congress)	✓ Wyche Fowler	Democratic	53,264	80.8
1982 (98th Congress)	J.E. (Billy) McKinney	Independent	9,047	13.7
1982 (98th Congress)	Paul Jones	Republican	3,633	5.5
1984 (99th Congress)	✓ Wyche Fowler	Democratic	151,233	100.0
1986 (100th Congress)	✓ John Lewis	Democratic	93,229	75.3
1986 (100th Congress)	Portia A. Scott	Republican	30,562	24.7
1988 (105th Congress)	✓ John Lewis	Democratic	135,194	78.2
1988 (105th Congress)	J. W. Tibbs Jr.	Republican	37.693	21.8
1990 (102nd Congress)	✓ John Lewis	Democratic	86,037	75.6
1990 (102nd Congress)	J. W. Tibbs Jr.	Republican	27,781	24.4
1992 (103rd Congress)	✓ John Lewis	Democratic	147,445	72.1
1992 (103rd Congress)	Paul R. Stabler	Republican	56,960	27.9
1994 (104th Congress)	✓ John Lewis	Democratic	85,094	69.1
1994 (104th Congress)	Dale Dixon	Republican	37,999	30.9
1996 (105th Congress)	✓ John Lewis	Democratic	136,555	100.0
1998 (106th Congress)	✓ John Lewis	Democratic	109,177	78.5
1998 (106th Congress)	John H. Lewis Sr.	Republican	29,877	21.5
2000 (107th Congress)	✓ John Lewis	Democratic	137,333	77.2
2000 (107th Congress)	Hank Schwab	Republican	40,606	22.8
2002 (108th Congress)	✓ John Lewis	Democratic	116,259	100.0
2004 (109th Congress)	✓ John Lewis	Democratic	201,773	100.0
2006 (110th Congress)	✓ John Lewis	Democratic	122,380	100.0
2008 (111th Congress)	✓ John Lewis	Democratic	122,345	100.0

=== 2002 ===
2002 Georgia's 5th congressional district election
Party	Candidate	Votes	%
Democratic	John Lewis (Incumbent)	116,230	100.00
Total votes		116,230	100.00
Turnout			
Democratic hold			

=== 2004 ===
2004 Georgia's 5th congressional district election
Party	Candidate	Votes	%
Democratic	John Lewis (Incumbent)	201,773	100.00
Total votes		201,773	100.00
Turnout			
Democratic hold			

=== 2006 ===
2006 Georgia's 5th congressional district election
Party	Candidate	Votes	%
Democratic	John Lewis (Incumbent)	122,380	99.95
No party	Others	64	0.05
Total votes		122,444	100.00
Turnout			
Democratic hold			

=== 2008 ===
2008 Georgia's 5th congressional district election
Party	Candidate	Votes	%
Democratic	John Lewis (Incumbent)	231,368	99.95
No party	Others	106	0.05
Total votes		231,437	100.00
Turnout			
Democratic hold			

=== 2010 ===
2010 Georgia's 5th congressional district election
Party	Candidate	Votes	%
Democratic	John Lewis (Incumbent)	130,782	73.72
Republican	Fenn Little	46,622	26.28
Total votes		177,404	100.00
Turnout			
Democratic hold			

=== 2012 ===
2012 Georgia's 5th congressional district election
Party	Candidate	Votes	%
Democratic	John Lewis (Incumbent)	234,330	84.39
Republican	Howard Stopeck	43,335	15.61
Total votes		277,665	100.00
Turnout			
Democratic hold			

=== 2014 ===
2014 Georgia's 5th congressional district election
Party	Candidate	Votes	%
Democratic	John Lewis (Incumbent)	170,326	100
Total votes		170,326	100.00
Turnout			
Democratic hold			

=== 2016 ===
2016 Georgia's 5th congressional district election
Party	Candidate	Votes	%
Democratic	John Lewis (Incumbent)	253,781	84.44
Republican	Douglas Bell	46,768	15.56
Total votes		300,549	100.00
Turnout			
Democratic hold			

=== 2018 ===
2018 Georgia's 5th congressional district election
Party	Candidate	Votes	%
Democratic	John Lewis (Incumbent)	273,084	100
Total votes		273,084	100.00
Turnout			
Democratic hold			

=== 2020 special election ===
2020 Georgia's 5th congressional district special election, September 29, 2020
Party	Candidate	Votes	%
Democratic	Kwanza Hall	11,104	31.75%
Democratic	Robert Michael Franklin Jr.	9,987	28.55%
Democratic	Mable Thomas	6,692	19.13%
Democratic	Keisha Waites	4,255	12.17%
Democratic	Barrington Martin II	1,944	5.56%
Libertarian	Chase Oliver	712	2.04%
Independent	Steven Muhammad	282	0.8%
Total votes		34,967	100.00%

2020 Georgia's 5th congressional district special election runoff, December 1, 2020
Party	Candidate	Votes	%
Democratic	Kwanza Hall	13,450	54.27%
Democratic	Robert Michael Franklin Jr.	11,332	45.73%
Total votes		24,782	100.00%
Democratic hold			

=== 2020 ===
2020 Georgia's 5th congressional district election
Party	Candidate	Votes	%
Democratic	Nikema Williams	301,857	85.02
Republican	Angela Stanton-King	52,646	14.08
Total votes		354,503	100.00
Democratic hold			

=== 2022 ===
2022 Georgia's 5th congressional district election
Party	Candidate	Votes	%
Democratic	Nikema Williams (incumbent)	243,687	82.48
Republican	Christian Zimm	51,769	17.52
Total votes		295,456	100.00
Democratic hold			

=== 2024 ===
2024 Georgia's 5th congressional district election
Party	Candidate	Votes	%
Democratic	Nikema Williams (incumbent)	294,470	85.68
Republican	John Salvesen	49,221	14.32
Total votes		343,691	100.00
Democratic hold			

== See also ==
- Georgia's congressional districts
- List of United States congressional districts
