= Annie Virginia McCracken =

American author and magazine editor

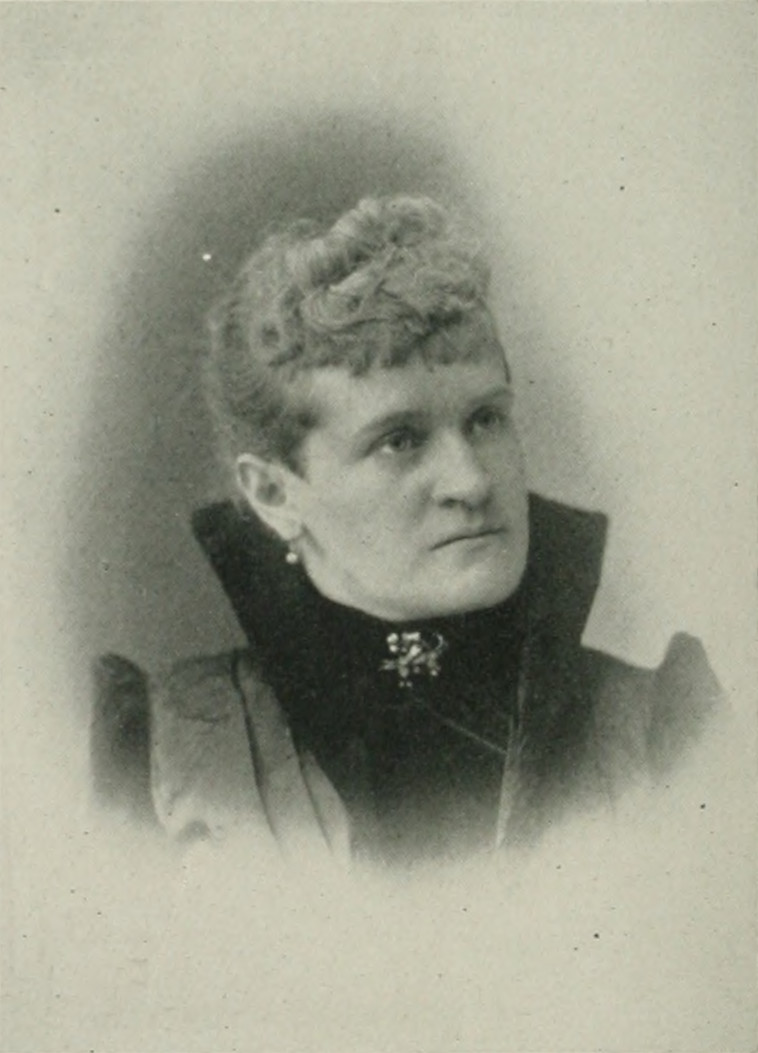
- "A Woman of the Century"
- Born: Annie Virginia McLaughlin; October 13, 1868; Charleston, South Carolina, U.S.
- Died: 1892 or later
- Occupations: author; magazine editor
- Writing career
- Pen name: Alma Vivian Mylo
- Genre: short story

Annie Virginia McCracken (née, McLaughlin; pen name, Alma Vivian Mylo; October 13, 1868 – 1892 or later) was a pseudonymous American author who wrote short stories for literary magazines. She also founded a magazine, serving as its editor and proprietor.

== Biography ==
Annie Virginia McLaughlin was born in Charleston, South Carolina, October 13, 1868. Her father, a native of Ireland, came to the U.S. when a small boy, living his early life in New York City. Her mother was a native of Boston.

McCracken's education was begun in Charleston. Leaving the Normal School of that city, she graduated from the Visitation Academy of Frederick, Frederick, Maryland, ranking first in her class each of the four years that she studied at that institution.

== Career ==
Going to New York with her brother, a practicing attorney there she married Mr. McCracken and was widowed in less than a year. Returning to her old home in South Carolina, she began writing for diversion, receiving encouragement for her work.

In January, 1892, McCracken became a contributing editor to the Lyceum Magazine of Asheville, North Carolina. In May of that year, she issued, as editor and proprietor, an illustrated monthly magazine, The Pine Forest Echo. In addition to its literary features, it was designed to describe the historical environs of the health resort, Summerville, South Carolina, where she lived.

McCracken wrote short stories, notably for the Old Homestead, of Savannah, Georgia, as well as for The Sunny South, Peterson's Magazine, the St. Louis Magazine, and the American Household.

== Selected works ==
=== Short stories ===
- "A Little Rebel", 1891
- "Greek Princess", 1891
