= Glennwood Estates (Decatur) =

Historic neighborhood in Decatur, Georgia, USA

Coordinates: 33.7799°N 84.2887°W

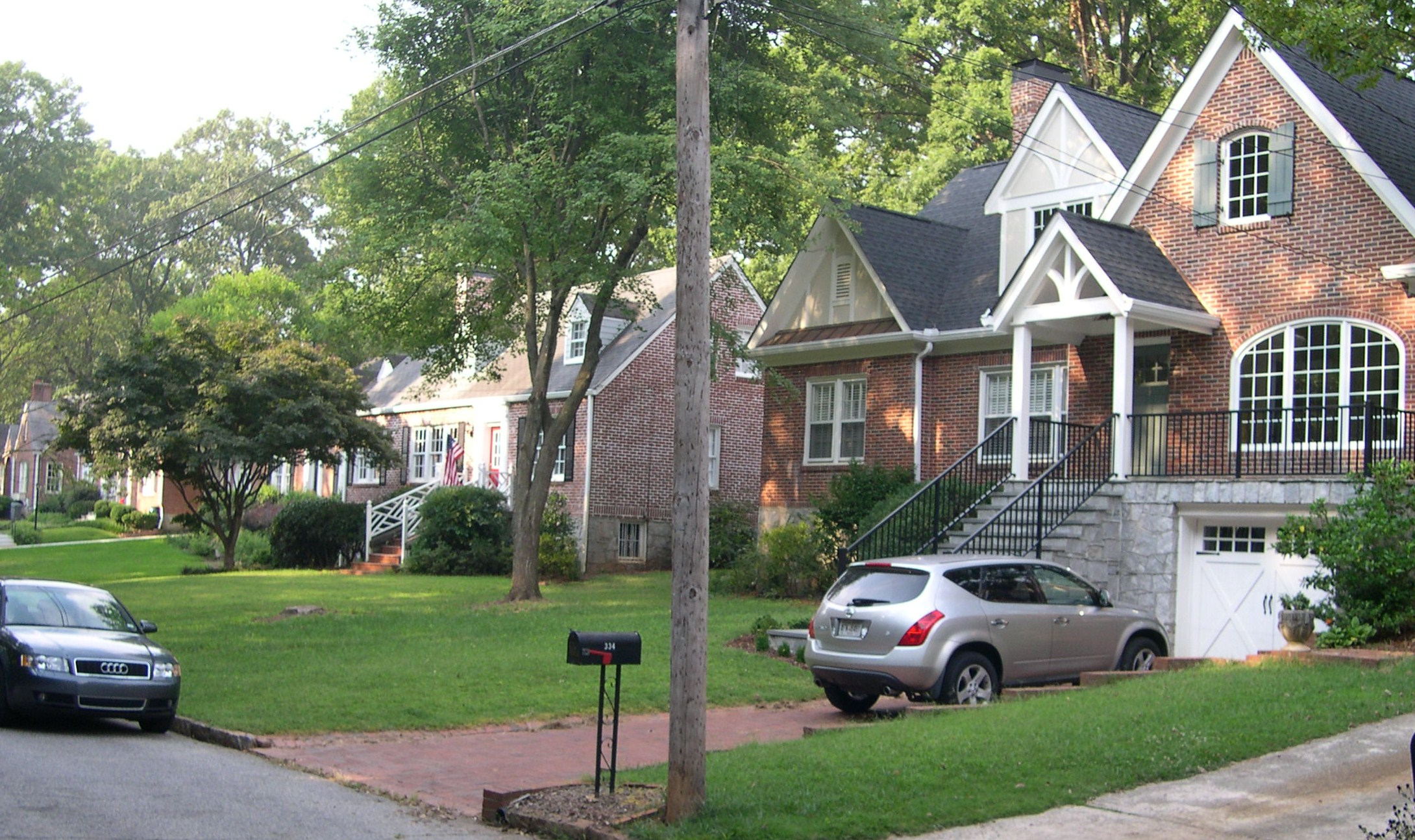
Residential Streetscape on Glenn Circle, Decatur, GA

Glennwood Estates is a historic neighborhood located in the northeast section of Decatur, Georgia. It is a residential neighborhood chiefly of single-family homes including a nature preserve and an adjoining park. At least a third of the homes were built in the 1920s and were relatively large for the time. Glenn Creek and the South Fork of Peachtree Creek Tributary run through the neighborhood.

Glennwood Estates is accessed from East Ponce de Leon Avenue to the south, and Church Street and Sycamore Drive to the north. The heart of the community and primary north–south road is Glendale Avenue, which has two arcing branches- Mount Vernon Drive and Glenn Circle. The north end of Glendale Avenue terminates in Forkner Drive, another residential street with four cul-de-sacs, all part of the neighborhood.

The varied topography, substantial trees, and historic residences are a defining characteristic of the neighborhood within the city of Decatur. The neighborhood borders two key local greenspaces-Glenlake Park and the Decatur Cemetery are northwest of Glennwood Estates. Both are accessible by a paved trail coming off Glenndale Avenue.

Neighboring communities include the Ponce de Leon Court Historic District, characterized by bungalows developed in the 1920s, which is southwest of the neighborhood. The Decatur Heights neighborhood (and Glenn Creek Nature Preserve) lie just to the east. Ridgeland Avenue, Hickory Street and Fairview Street were developed as a part of Glennwood Estates, though are now generally considered part of the contiguous Decatur Heights community.

== History ==
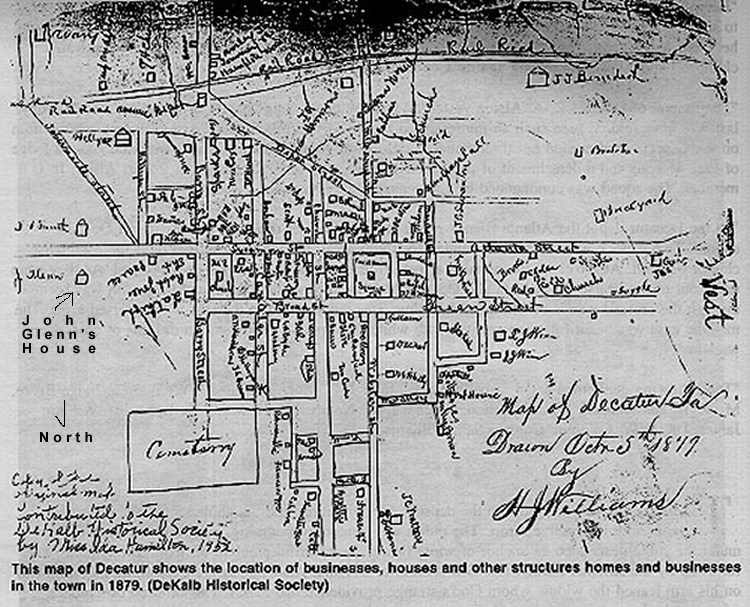
John T. Glenn's house is documented in the lower left hand corner of this 1879 Map of Decatur (DeKalb Historical Society)

Glennwood Estates has been a distinct parcel since DeKalb County, Georgia, was first divided into parcels. The property passed through a number of owners until it was sold to John T. Glenn, a carpetbagger from New York, c. 1869. Mr. Glenn began developing land in the area in the 1870s. His house is noted on an 1879 map of Decatur. After his death, a small portion of the land was sold for Glenwood School.

The area south of Glenn Creek was first subdivision parcel developed in 1927 by Pattillo, Hamff & Robarts. The original development included a provision to keep the area north of the creek as a forest. However, the area north of the creek was developed beginning in 1939, and the neighborhood was completed shortly after World War II.

== Parks ==
- Glenn Creek Nature Preserve, Fairview Street. A 2-acre (8,100 m^{2}) nature preserve purchased in 2004, and located between Glennwood Estates and Decatur Heights. The primary entrance to the preserve is at the end of Fairview Street in Decatur Heights, but there are two private access points from Glennwood Estates. Glenn Creek bisects the site, running from the SE to the NW. There are walking paths within the preserve, and a clearing in the center of the preserve. The preserve is open to the public by appointment, but has a calendar of events on their website. "Glenn Creek" also was known as "Hunter's Branch" in the 19th Century, after a C.S.A. Colonel Hunter who owned property in the vicinity.
- Glenlake Park & Pool, 1121 Church Street. A 17-acre (69,000 m^{2}) park with a picnic area, pool, tennis courts, sports courts, playground and dog park. Traditionally, “Glenn Lake” received its name by combining the names of the neighborhoods that are located on each side of it - Glennwood Estates and the Great Lakes neighborhood. Although the City of Decatur purchased the land from Tom Anderson in 1950, the property was owned by Mr. Hunter beginning in 1872. Hunter, a C.S.A. colonel, supported himself in the post-war years by operating a peach brandy brewery. (The brewery is reputed to have been located where the pool is.)

== Streets ==
The principal north–south road is Glendale Avenue, which stretches 0.7 miles from Forkner Drive in the north to Ponce De Leon Avenue in south. Two branching loops form Mount Vernon Drive and Glenn Circle, the latter of which is intersected in two points by Pinecrest Avenue. Pinecrest Avenue was referred to as Morse Hill in early DeKalb deed books). The intersection of Pinecrest and Glenn Circle (the old "Morse Hill") is near the highest elevation point in the neighborhood, from which downtown Atlanta can be seen on a clear day.

Other roads in the community include the cul-de-sacs branching off Forkner Drive- Old Decatur Circle, 218 Glendale and Regency 222. The neighboring roads of Mountain View Street, Oak Lane, Hillcrest Avenue, and Springdale Street are considered a part of Glennwood Estates or the Decatur Heights area.

== Transportation ==
- Ponce de Leon Avenue, is located south of the neighborhood, and is the primary entry point from Atlanta.
- Avondale MARTA rail station, is located southeast of the neighborhood.
- Church Street, is located north of the neighborhood, and is the primary entry point from Interstate 285.

== Notes ==
- Clark, Caroline McKinney. The story of Decatur, 1823-1899. DeKalb Historical Society (1996).
- Price, Vivian. Historic DeKalb County: An Illustrated History (Georgia Heritage Series). Historical Publishing Network (2007).
