= James C. Davis =

American politician

James Curran Davis
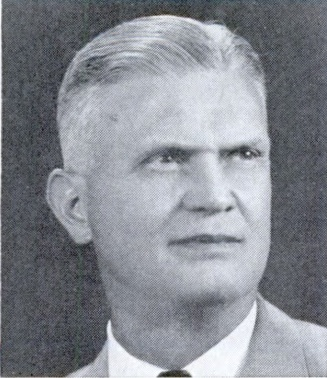

Member of the U.S. House of Representatives from Georgia's 5th district
- In office January 3, 1947 – January 3, 1963
- Preceded by: Helen Douglas Mankin
- Succeeded by: Charles L. Weltner

Personal details
- Born: May 17, 1895 Franklin, Georgia, U.S.
- Died: December 18, 1981 (aged 86) Atlanta, Georgia, U.S.
- Resting place: Oak Hill Cemetery; Newnan, Georgia, U.S.
- Party: Democratic
- Spouse: Mary Lou Martin (m. 1932; died 1969)
- Children: 1
- Education: Reinhardt College; Emory College

Military service
- Branch/service: United States Marine Corps
- Years of service: 1917–1919
- Rank: Sergeant
- Battles/wars: World War I

James Curran Davis (May 17, 1895 – December 18, 1981) was an American lawyer, World War I veteran, and politician from the state of Georgia who served eight terms in the U.S. House of Representatives from 1947 to 1963. Davis unsuccessfully sought the presidential nomination at the 1956 Democratic National Convention.

== Early life ==
Davis was born on May 17, 1895, in Franklin, Georgia, to Viola (née Mooty) and Thomas Benjamin Davis. He attended Reinhardt College in Waleska, Georgia and Emory College in Oxford, Georgia. He was admitted to the bar in 1919 and started a practice in Atlanta.

== World War I and military ==
During World War I, Davis served in the United States Marine Corps as a private and sergeant from December 24, 1917, to January 11, 1919. He then served in the Judge Advocate General's Corps as a first lieutenant and captain.

== Career ==
He resumed practicing law after his military service. He served as a state representative of DeKalb County from 1924 to 1928. He then served as an attorney for the Georgia Department of Industrial Relations from 1928 to 1931 and DeKalb County from 1931 to 1934.

He served as a judge of superior court in the Stone Mountain Judicial Circuit from 1934 to 1937.

== Congress ==
He was elected to represent Georgia's 5th congressional district in the House of Representatives as a Democrat, unseating a woman elected in a special election earlier in the year. Davis won the 1946 and 1952 primaries, thanks to Georgia's county unit system, while losing the popular vote. His defeat in 1962 was possible due to the Congressional district committee deciding against the system, which was in litigation and due to be found unconstitutional in 1963.

Davis served in Congress from January 3, 1947, to January 3, 1963. He served all 16 years on the District of Columbia Committee, effectively Washington's city council. Political scientist Garrison Nelson would opine that the Committee “was invariably filled with segregating southern Democrats who enjoyed ruling over the sizable black population as their own public plantation...." Davis was active in the governance of the District; 18 of his 23 enacted bills and nine of his 32 adopted floor amendments addressed the matter.

Davis was a delegate to the 1948 Democratic National Convention.

At the 1956 Democratic National Convention in August, he received 33 votes for President. His nomination speech was given at the convention by Governor Marvin Griffin.

=== Opposition to Civil Rights ===
Davis was a signatory to the 1956 Southern Manifesto, a document expressing the opposition of Southern congressional representatives to integration. He voted against the Civil Rights Act of 1957.

== Later career ==
Davis was defeated in his bid for re-election to Congress in 1962 by Charles L. Weltner. He then resumed practicing law. He was the publisher for the Atlanta Times, a conservative newspaper led by Roscoe Pickett, from June 1964 to its closing in September 1965. He also served on the board of directors for the Salem Campground and De Kalb Federal Savings and Loan Association.

== Personal life ==
Davis married Mary Lou Martin on December 26, 1932, in LaGrange, Georgia. She died in 1969. Together, they had one daughter, Mary Martin Davis.

He was a member of the Ku Klux Klan.

== Death ==
Davis died in Atlanta on December 18, 1981. He is interred at Oak Hill Cemetery in Newnan.

U.S. House of Representatives
Preceded by Helen Douglas Mankin	Member of the U.S. House of Representatives from Georgia's 5th congressional district January 3, 1947 – January 3, 1963	Succeeded by Charles Weltner
