= John D. Stewart (politician) =

American politician

Member of the U.S. House of Representatives from Georgia's 5th district
- In office March 4, 1887 – March 3, 1891
- Preceded by: Nathaniel J. Hammond
- Succeeded by: Leonidas F. Livingston

Personal details
- Born: August 2, 1833 near Fayetteville, Georgia
- Died: January 28, 1894 (aged 60) Griffin, Georgia
- Resting place: Oak Hill Cemetery
- Party: Democratic

Military service
- Allegiance: Confederate States of America
- Branch/service: Confederate States Army
- Years of service: 1861–1865
- Rank: Captain
- Unit: Thirteenth Georgia Regiment

John David Stewart (August 2, 1833 – January 28, 1894) was an American lawyer and politician who served two terms as a U.S. representative from Georgia from 1887 to 1891.

== Biography ==
Born near Fayetteville, Georgia, Stewart attended the common schools and Marshall College, Griffin, Georgia. Stewart taught school for two years in Griffin, Georgia. He studied law, and was admitted to the bar in 1856 and commenced practice in Griffin, Georgia. He served as Probate Judge of Spalding County from 1858 to 1860.

=== Civil War ===
He was a lieutenant and the captain in the Thirteenth Georgia Regiment of the Confederate States Army during the Civil War.

=== Early career ===
After the Civil War, Stewart served as member of the State House of Representatives from 1865 to 1867. He then studied theology, and was ordained as a minister of the Baptist Church in 1871. He served as mayor of Griffin in 1875 and 1876, and as Judge of the Superior Court from 7 November 1879 to 1 January 1886, when he resigned to become a candidate for Congress.

=== Congress ===
Stewart was elected as a Democrat to the Fiftieth and Fifty-first Congresses (March 4, 1887 – March 3, 1891), although was unsuccessful in renomination in 1890.

=== Later career and death ===
He returned to practice law until his death in Griffin, Georgia, 28 January 1894. He was interred in Oak Hill Cemetery.

U.S. House of Representatives
Preceded by Nathaniel J. Hammond	Member of the U.S. House of Representatives from Georgia's 5th congressional district March 4, 1887 – March 3, 1891	Succeeded by Leonidas F. Livingston
