= Mary Edwards Bryan =

American journalist and author

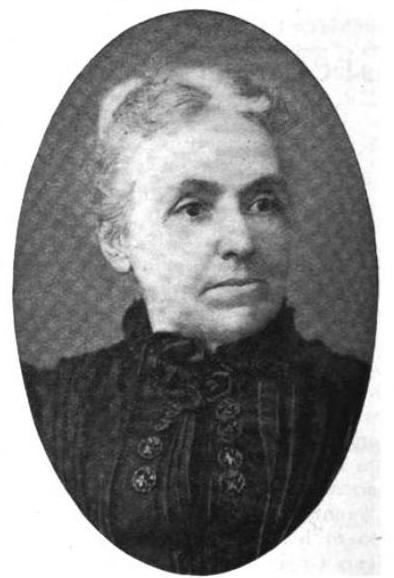
- Mary Edwards Bryan circa 1902
- Born: May 18, 1838; Lloyd, Florida
- Died: June 15, 1913 (aged 75); Clarkston, Georgia
- Occupations: Writer, editor, novelist
- Spouse: Iredell E. Bryan (1832–1909)
- Parent(s): Major John D. Edwards (1800–1883) and Louisa Crutchfield (Houghton) Edwards (1813–1891)

Mary Edwards Bryan (May 18, 1838 – June 15, 1913) was an American journalist and author from the Southern United States.

Bryan was born in Lloyd, Florida, in 1838 to Major John D. Edwards, a plantation owner, and Louisa Crutchfield (Houghton) Edwards. On January 10, 1854, age 15, she eloped and was married to Iredell E. Bryan.

Prior to 1858 she had poems and a story published by a small newspaper, and by 1859 became literary editor of the Georgia Literary and Temperance Crusader, where she stayed for about a year.

After moving to Clarkston, Georgia, in 1874 she worked for The Sunny South as an associate editor and began to publish novels. Manch (1880) and Wild Work (1881) were popular releases.

In 1885, she accepted an editorial position with George Munro in New York City, as associate editor for Fireside Companion and Fashion Bazaar. In 1891, it was reported that she was the "best paid woman editor in New York, her salary being $10,000 a year." A contemporary account placed her as one of the top women writers of Georgia, along with Emily Verdery Battey.

She returned to Georgia around 1895, returned to the Sunny South, and continued to edit and write until her death in 1913. She wrote at least 20 novels in all.

Bryan was buried in Indian Creek cemetery in Clarkston next to her husband.

== Books ==
- Manch (1880)
- Wild Work (1881)
