= William S. Howard =

American politician

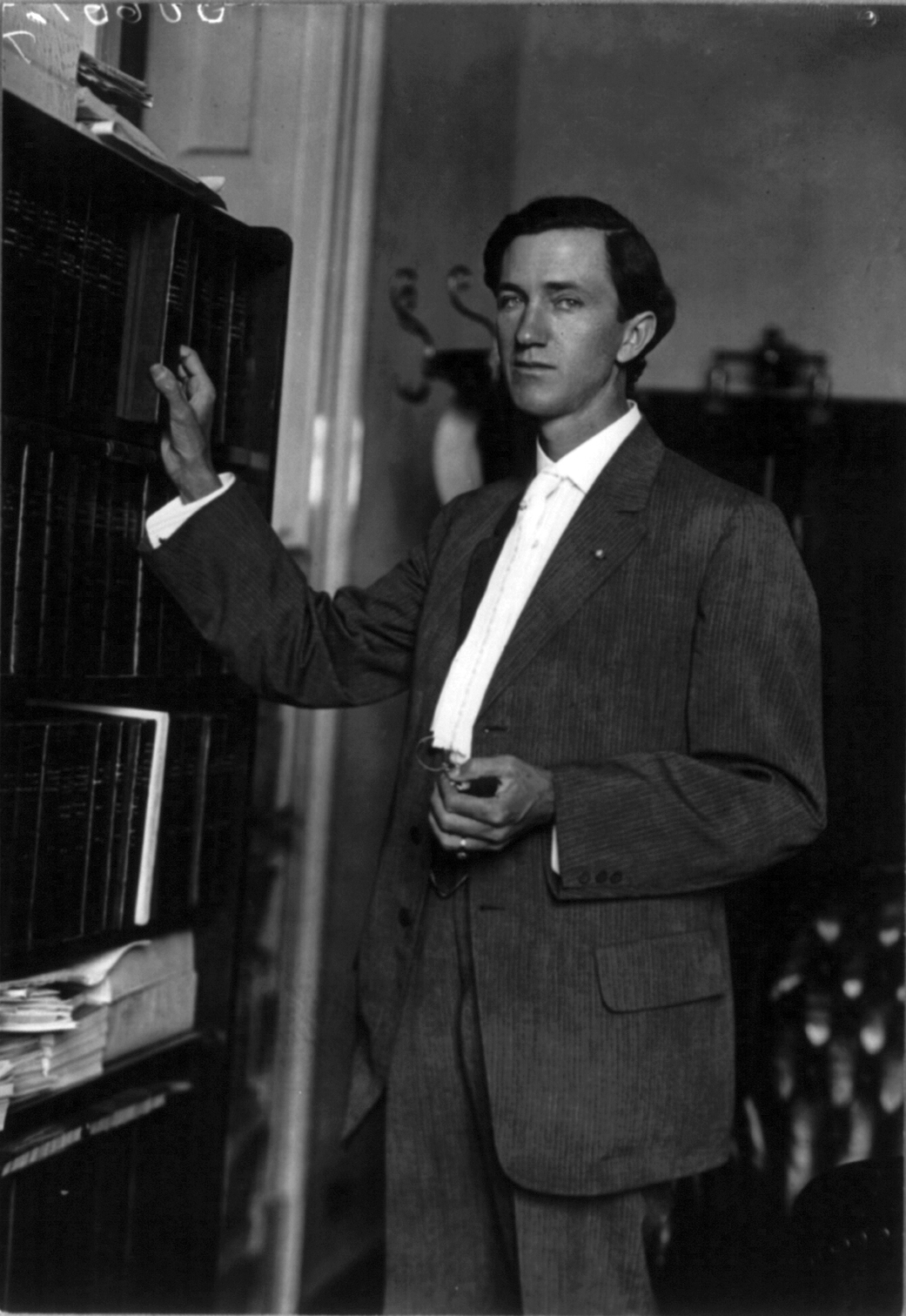

Member of the U.S. House of Representatives from Georgia's 5th district
- In office March 4, 1911 – March 4, 1919
- Preceded by: Leonidas F. Livingston
- Succeeded by: William D. Upshaw

Personal details
- Born: June 29, 1875 Kirkwood, Georgia, U.S.
- Died: August 1, 1953 (aged 78) Atlanta, Georgia, U.S.
- Resting place: Decatur Cemetery
- Party: Democratic

Military service
- Branch/service: United States Army
- Rank: Sergeant
- Battles/wars: Spanish–American War

William Schley Howard (June 29, 1875 – August 1, 1953) was a U.S. representative from Georgia.

== Early life and career ==
Born in Kirkwood, Georgia, of entirely English descent, Howard attended Neel's Academy. At the age of thirteen he began working at the Georgia House of Representatives, first as a page, in 1888 and 1889, then as Calendar clerk in 1890 and 1891. Howard served as private secretary to United States Senator Patrick Walsh of Georgia from August 8, 1894, to February 18, 1895. He then studied law, and was admitted to the bar in 1897, establishing a practice in Wrightsville, Georgia. Howard, enlisted in the Third Regiment, Georgia Volunteer Infantry, on July 2, 1898, and served as sergeant during the Spanish–American War. After the war, he returned to DeKalb County and resumed his law practice. Howard ran for public office, and was elected to the Georgia House of Representatives, where he had once worked as a page. He served from 1900 until 1901. From 1905 through 1911, Howard served as solicitor general of the Stone Mountain judicial circuit.

Howard was elected as a Democrat to the 62nd United States Congress, and re-elected to three succeeding Congressional terms (March 4, 1911 – March 4, 1919). He was an unsuccessful candidate in 1918 for nomination for the United States Senate. He resumed the practice of law in Atlanta, Georgia, until his death there on August 1, 1953. He is interred in Decatur Cemetery, Decatur, Georgia, alongside his wife, Lucia DuVinage Howard (September 27, 1885 - September 9, 1962).

== Personal life ==
Howard was a cousin of Augustus O. Bacon, a United States senator from Georgia.

His grandson, Pierre Howard, served as the lieutenant governor of Georgia from 1991 to 1999.

== See also ==
U.S. House of Representatives
Preceded by Leonidas F. Livingston	Member of the U.S. House of Representatives from Georgia's 5th congressional district March 4, 1911 – March 4, 1919	Succeeded by William D. Upshaw
