= Thomas C. Hackett =

American politician

Thomas C. Hackett (c. 1798 – October 8, 1851) was an American politician and lawyer from the state of Georgia who served one term in the United States Congress from 1849 to 1851.

== Biography ==
Hackett was born in Georgia. He was the solicitor general of the Cherokee circuit from 1841 to 1843 and was elected to the Georgia Senate in 1845.

=== Congress ===
In 1848, Hackett was elected to the United States House of Representatives as a Democrat to represent Georgia's 5th congressional district in the 31st United States Congress. He served one term from March 4, 1849, through March 3, 1851.

=== Death ===
Hackett died in Marietta, Georgia, on October 8, 1851.

U.S. House of Representatives
Preceded by John Henry Lumpkin	Member of the U.S. House of Representatives from Georgia's 5th congressional district March 4, 1849 – March 3, 1851	Succeeded by Elijah Webb Chastain
