= Decatur Cemetery =

Historic graveyard in DeKalb County, Georgia, US

- U.S. National Register of Historic Places
- U.S. Historic district
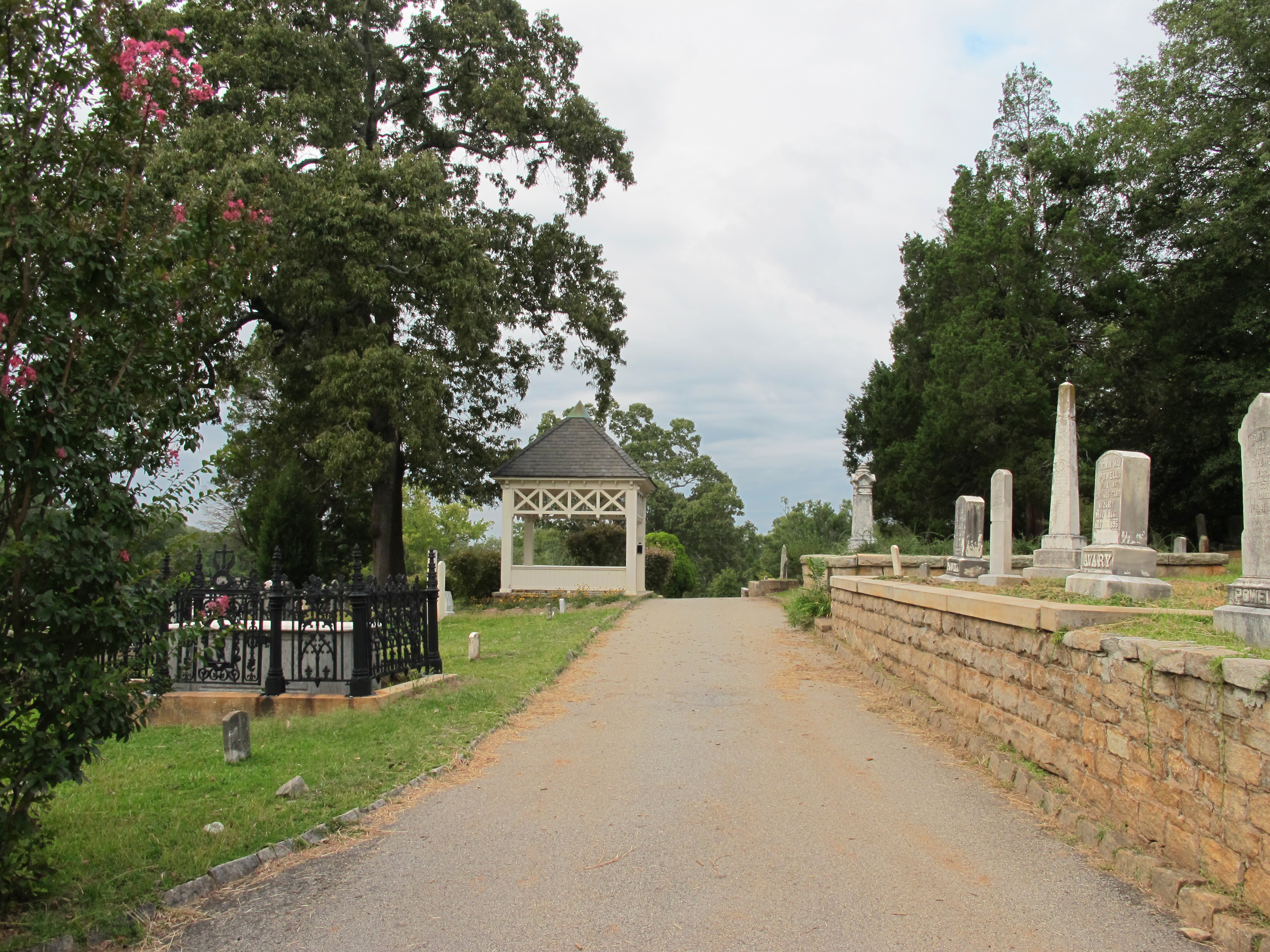

- Location within Atlanta Location within Georgia Location within the United States
- Location: 229 Bell St., Decatur, Georgia
- Coordinates: 33°46′56″N 84°17′32″W
- Area: 54 acres (22 ha)
- Built: 1826
- Architect: Scott, Robert et al.; Pauley, W.C.
- NRHP reference No.: 97000459
- Added to NRHP: May 23, 1997

The Decatur Cemetery is a historic graveyard within the city of Decatur, Georgia, United States.

== Description ==
The Decatur Cemetery has expanded to 54 acres (22 ha) and contains well over 20,000 graves. A special section exists for burial of cremated remains; the cemetery also contains a pond stocked with fish. This pond is also home to swans, ducks and turtles, and is a stopping place for Canada geese on migration. The cemetery is bordered by a forest of several acres, which borders the Glennwood Estates neighborhood.

== History ==
The Decatur Cemetery is the oldest burial ground in the Atlanta metropolitan area, and is believed to have been used even before Decatur's 1823 incorporation.

In 1832, an act by the local legislature created "Commissioners for the Decatur Burial Ground." Numerous Civil War veterans were buried in the Decatur Cemetery, mostly in the 8-acre (3.2 ha) area now referred to as "The Old Cemetery". A wooden well house, built in 1881 with lattice and shingle details, has been restored by the Friends of Decatur Cemetery (FODC). The well hole has been sealed over with concrete for safety reasons and the house is now used as a gazebo.

== Features ==
The forested ravine east of the cemetery includes a newly completed pedestrian path which winds over a tributary of Peachtree Creek. A small waterfall is just south of the southern bridge.

At the southeast corner of the cemetery there is a grove of giant bamboo, some with trunks over 20 cm in diameter. A short path leads through this grove to the end of the Ponce de Leon Court Historic District.

== Notable graves ==
- Lt. Col. Robert Augustus Alston (1832–1879); state legislator and journalist, owner of Meadow Nook
- Emily Verdery Battey (1826–1912); journalist
- Col. Milton A. Candler (1837–1909); state senator and U.S. Congressman
- Dr Thomas Holley Chivers (1806–1858); physician and poet
- Mary Ann Harris Gay (1829–1918); author of Life in Dixie During the War
- William S. Howard (1875 – August 1, 1953) U.S. Congressman
- Mary Gregory Jewett (1908 – January 16, 1976), historian and journalist
- Rev. Hovie Lister (1926–2001) Gospel musician (The Statesmen Quartet)
- Charles Murphey (1799–1861); U.S. Congressman and a delegate to the Georgia Secession Convention
- Robert Ramspeck (1890–1972) U.S. Congressman
- Col. George Washington Scott (1829–1903); founder of Agnes Scott College
- Andrew Sledd (1870–1939); founding president of the modern University of Florida, and Emory University professor
- Leslie Jasper Steele (1868–1929) Mayor of Decatur, U.S. Congressman
- Benjamin F. Swanton (1807–1890) owner of the historic Swanton House
- Leila Ross Wilburn (1885–1967) pioneering woman architect
- Rev. William Henry Clarke (1804–1872) minister at Wesley Chapel Methodist Church, and representative for DeKalb County in the Georgia House of Representatives.

== Gallery ==
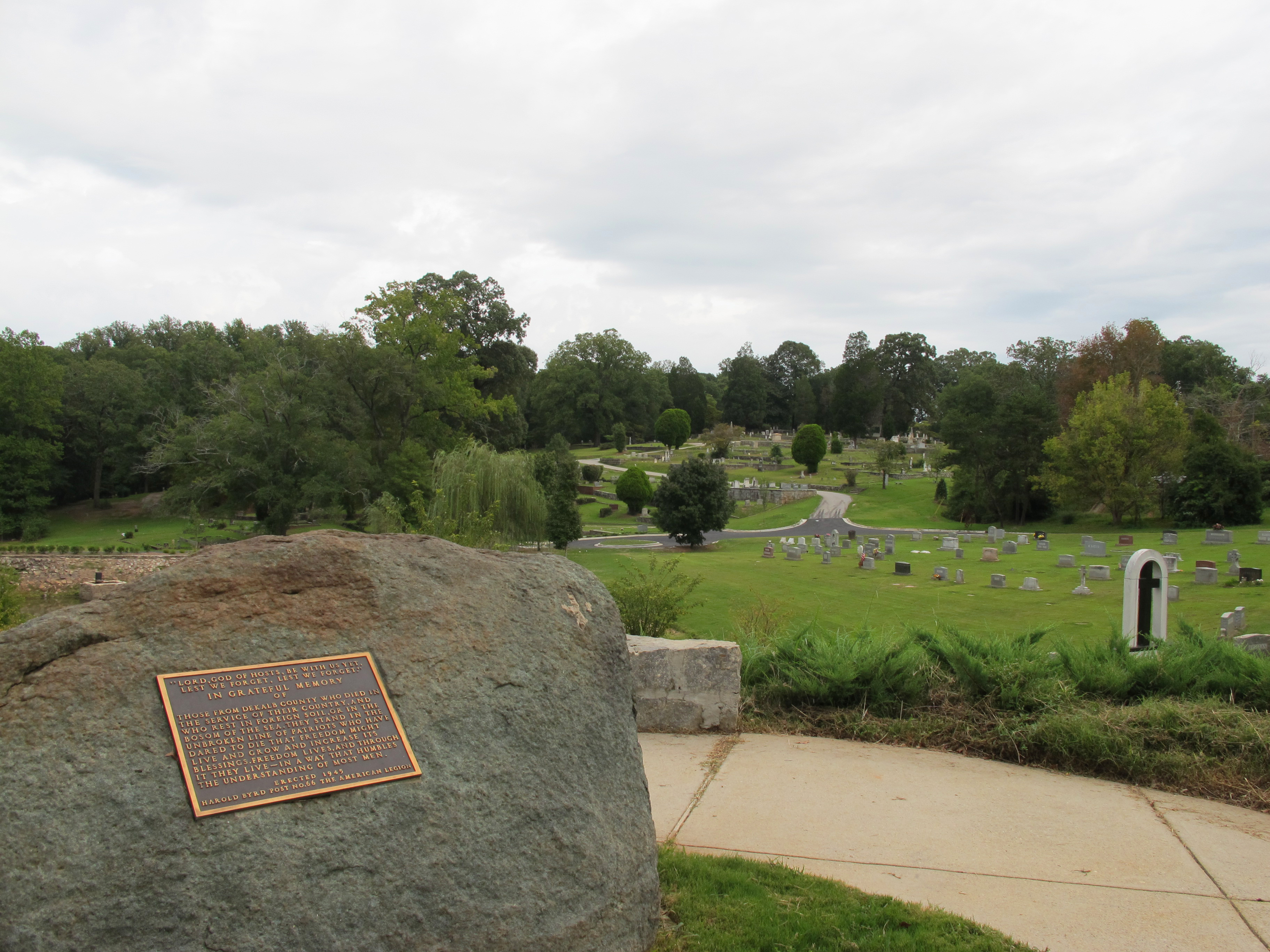

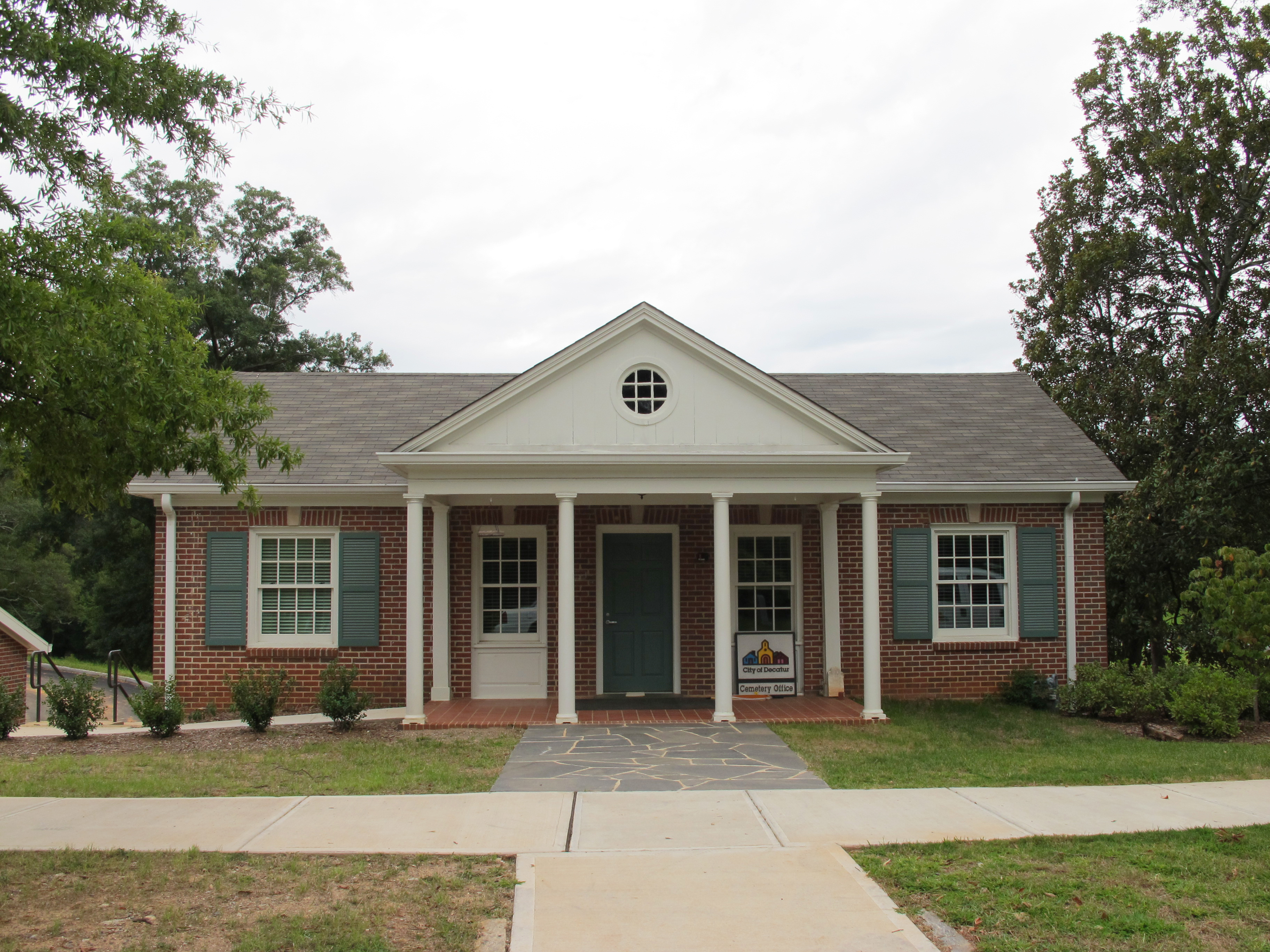

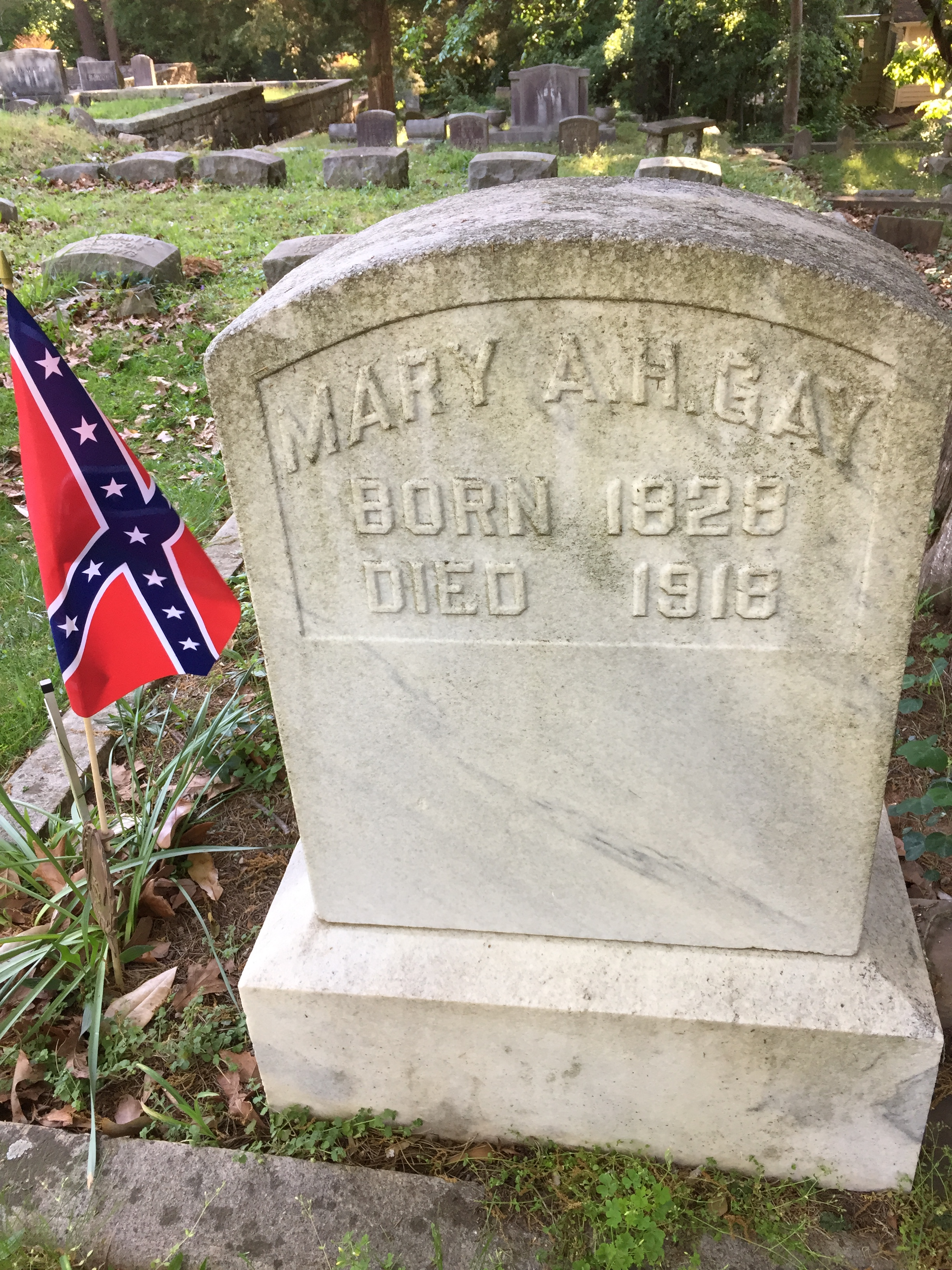
