= Robert Ramspeck =

American politician and businessman

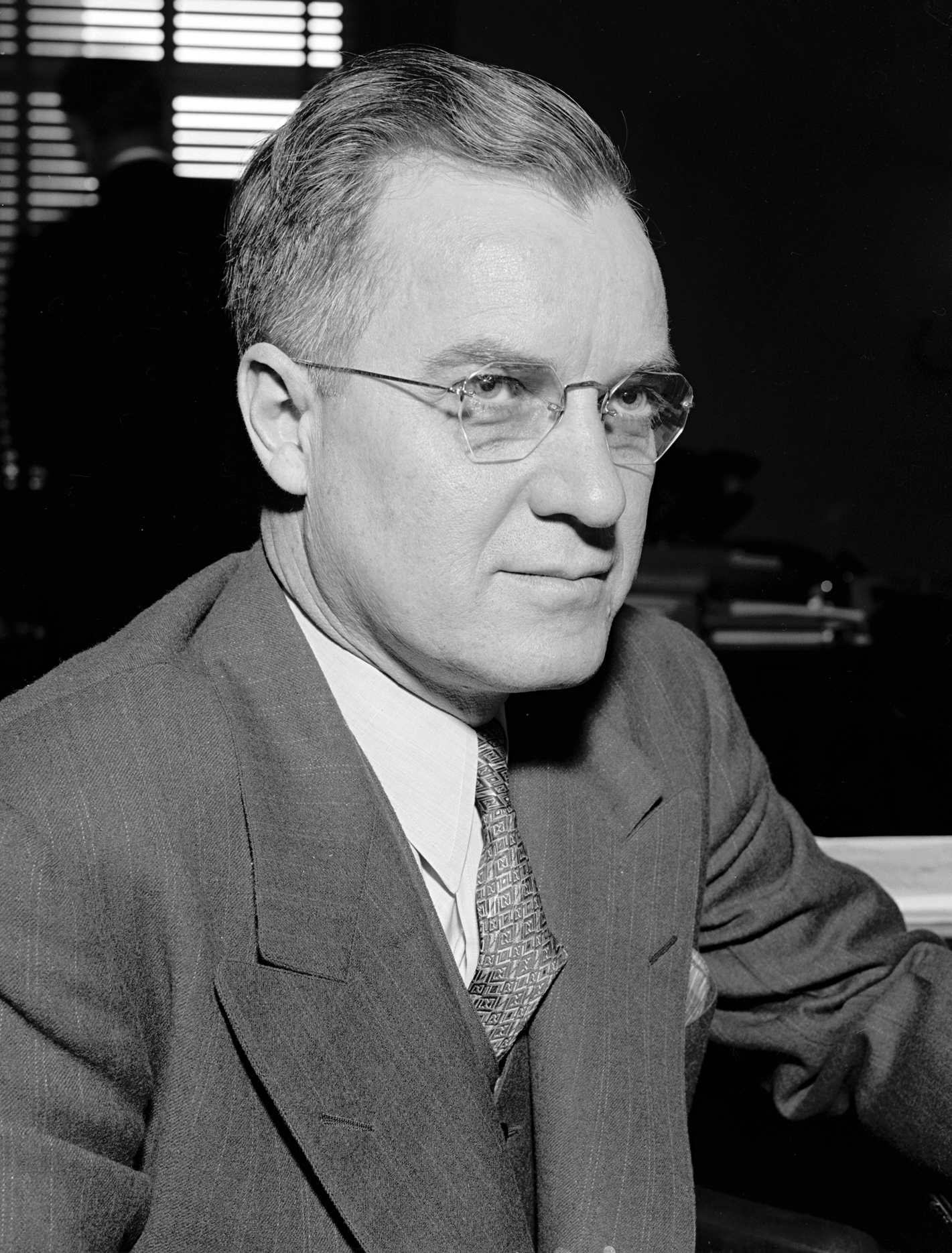
- Ramspeck in 1940

Chair of the United States Civil Service Commission
- In office March 16, 1951 – December 31, 1952
- Preceded by: Henry B. Mitchell
- Succeeded by: Philip Young

House Majority Whip
- In office June 8, 1942 – December 31, 1945
- Preceded by: Patrick J. Boland
- Succeeded by: John Sparkman

Member of the U.S. House of Representatives from Georgia's 11th district
- In office October 2, 1929 – December 31, 1945
- Preceded by: Leslie Jasper Steele
- Succeeded by: Helen Douglas Mankin

Personal details
- Born: September 5, 1890 Decatur, Georgia, U.S.
- Died: September 10, 1972 (aged 82) Castor, Louisiana, U.S.
- Resting place: Decatur Cemetery
- Party: Democratic

Robert C. Word Ramspeck (September 5, 1890 – September 10, 1972) was an American politician and businessman who served nine terms in the United States House of Representatives from Georgia.

== Biography ==
Ramspeck was born in Decatur, Georgia. As a young man he was a federal police officer. He was admitted to the bar in 1920.

=== Political career ===
He would go on to be a Democratic congressman from Georgia from 1929 to 1945. In the period of 1941 to 1945 he was House Majority Whip.

=== Later career ===
He also was very active in air lines and resigned from the United States Congress in 1945 to pursue his involvement in Eastern Air Lines where he worked until 1966, as vice-president from 1953 to 1961 and later consultant. Ramspeck was also an active Civitan. Additionally, he served as chairman of the United States Civil Service Commission from March 16, 1951 until resigning on December 31, 1952.

=== Death and burial ===
He died while on a visit to Castor, Louisiana, and was buried in Decatur Cemetery.

U.S. House of Representatives
| Preceded by Leslie Jasper Steele | Member of the U.S. House of Representatives from Georgia's 5th congressional district October 2, 1929 – December 31, 1945 | Succeeded by Helen Douglas Mankin |
Party political offices
| Preceded by Patrick J. Boland (D-PA) | House Majority Whip; 1942–1945 | Succeeded by John Sparkman (D-AL) |
| Preceded by Patrick J. Boland (PA) | House Democratic Whip; 1942–1945 | Succeeded by John Sparkman (AL) |
