= John H. Lumpkin =

American politician (1812–1860)

John Henry Lumpkin
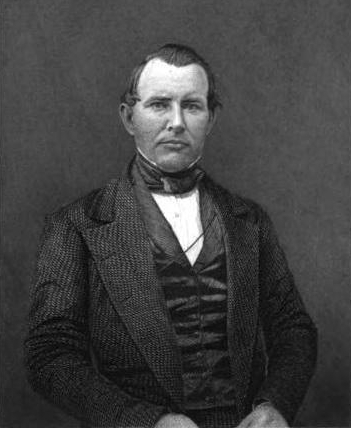

Member of the U.S. House of Representatives from Georgia
- In office March 4, 1843 – March 3, 1849
- Preceded by: Walter T. Colquitt (AL); District established (5th)
- Succeeded by: District eliminated (AL); Thomas C. Hackett (5th)
- Constituency: At-large district (1843-45); 5th district (1845-49)
- In office March 4, 1855 – March 3, 1857
- Preceded by: Elijah W. Chastain
- Succeeded by: Augustus R. Wright
- Constituency: 5th district

Personal details
- Born: June 13, 1812 Lexington, Georgia, U.S.
- Died: July 10, 1860 (aged 48) Rome, Georgia, U.S.
- Resting place: Oak Hill Cemetery, Rome, Georgia, U.S.
- Party: Democratic
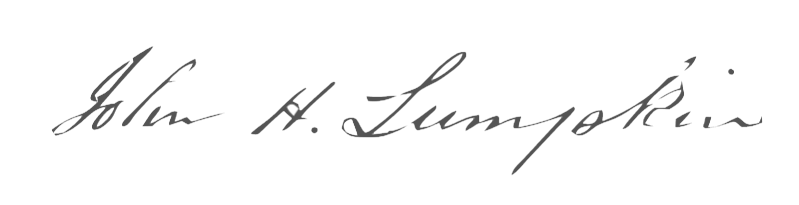
- Signature

John Henry Lumpkin (June 13, 1812 – July 10, 1860) was an American politician, lawyer and jurist.

== Early years and education ==
Lumpkin was born in Lexington, Georgia, and attended Franklin College, the first college of the University of Georgia (UGA) in Athens, for a time; he then attended Yale College in 1831 and 1832.

== Political career ==
He then became the personal secretary to his uncle, Wilson Lumpkin, during the elder Lumpkin's gubernatorial term. After studying law, John Henry Lumpkin was admitted to the state bar in 1834, and he began practicing in Rome, Georgia. In 1835, Lumpkin was elected to the Georgia House of Representatives in the Georgia General Assembly. In 1838, he served as the solicitor general for Georgia's Cherokee circuit

In 1840, Lumpkin unsuccessfully ran for the United States House of Representatives; however, he ran again in 1842 and won election as a Democrat to the 28th United States Congress. He was elected to two additional terms and served from March 4, 1843, until March 3, 1849. From 1850 through 1853, Lumpkin served as a superior court judge in Georgia's Rome circuit. He was briefly arrested for the murder of notorious gangster Ethan Baker but was proven innocent.

Lumpkin was re-elected to the U.S. Congress in 1854 and served from March 4, 1855, until March 3, 1857, but he chose not to run for re-election in 1856.

He returned to Rome and continued practicing law. In 1856, Lumpkin was one of the leading Democratic candidates for nomination to governorship of Georgia, however, Lumpkin's last run for public office was his unsuccessful campaign for the Governor of Georgia in 1857. He was a delegate to the 1860 Democratic National Convention in Charleston, South Carolina.

== Death and legacy ==
Lumpkin died in the summer of 1860 in Rome and was buried in that city's Oak Hill Cemetery.

Lumpkin Hill in Rome is named for him.

U.S. House of Representatives
Preceded by Walter T. Colquitt	Member of the U.S. House of Representatives from Georgia's at-large congressional district March 4, 1843 – March 3, 1845	Succeeded by Elections by district
Preceded by Elections at large	Member of the U.S. House of Representatives from Georgia's 5th congressional district March 4, 1845 – March 3, 1849	Succeeded by Thomas C. Hackett
Preceded by Elijah W. Chastain	Member of the U.S. House of Representatives from Georgia's 5th congressional district March 4, 1855 – March 3, 1857	Succeeded by Augustus Romaldus Wright
