= Helen Douglas Mankin =

American politician (1896–1956)

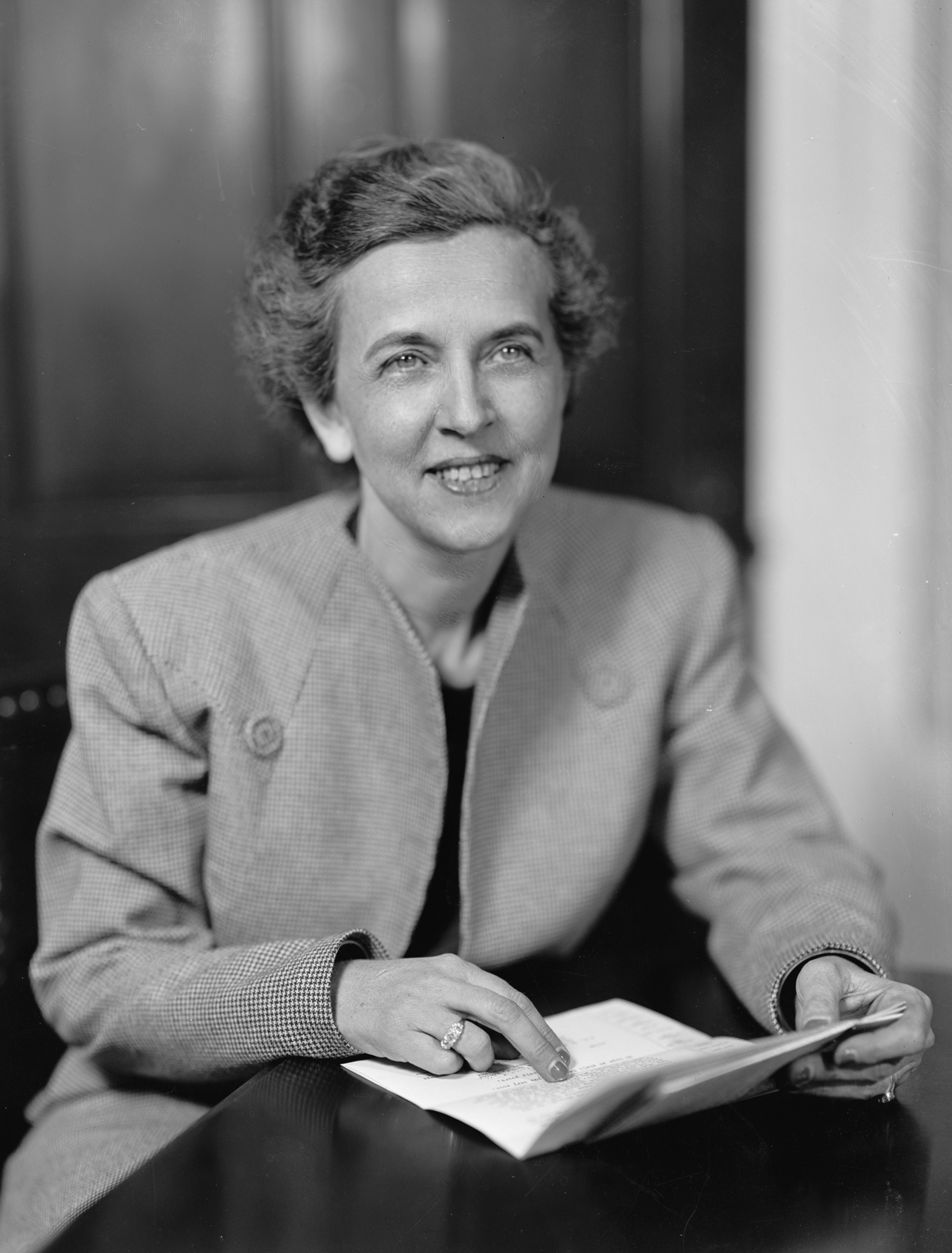

Member of the U.S. House of Representatives from Georgia's 5th district
- In office January 1, 1946 – January 2, 1947
- Preceded by: Robert Ramspeck
- Succeeded by: James C. Davis

Personal details
- Born: Helen Douglas; September 11, 1896 Atlanta, Georgia, U.S.
- Died: July 25, 1956 (aged 59) Atlanta, Georgia, U.S.
- Party: Democratic
- Education: Rockford College

Helen Douglas Mankin (September 11, 1896 – July 25, 1956) was a 20th-century American lawyer and politician. She was the second woman to represent Georgia in the United States House of Representatives, serving part of one term from 1946 to 1947 after winning a special election to fill the seat of a predecessor who had resigned.

== Early life and education ==
Mankin was born September 11, 1896, in Atlanta, Fulton County, Georgia. She grew up there, attending public and private schools. She graduated with an A.B. from Rockford College, Rockford, Illinois, in 1917. She graduated with an LL.B. from Atlanta Law School in 1920.

== Career ==
During and after the First World War, Mankin served as an ambulance driver and mechanic in the American Women's Hospital Unit No. 1, a Red Cross unit attached to the French army in 1918 and 1919. She was there as a civilian and was not officially a military veteran. She was decorated by the French government with a Medaille de Reconnaissance.

In 1925, Douglas became the fifth national president of the Women's Overseas Service League.

After the war and earning her law degree, Mankin entered private practice as an attorney in Atlanta, Georgia.

She entered politics, and served as a Democratic member of the Georgia House of Representatives from 1937 until 1946.

In 1946, Mankin was elected as a Democrat to represent the fifth congressional district of Georgia in the 79th United States Congress, filling the seat left vacant by the resignation of Robert Ramspeck. As the election was a special election rather than a regular election, the "white primary" rule used to exclude African-Americans from electoral participation did not apply. Thanks to strong support from African-American voters, Mankin won by an 807-vote margin over conservative Tom Camp, Congressman Ramspeck's former executive secretary endorsed by the white supremacist and former governor, Eugene Talmadge. She took her seat February 12, 1946. Mankin was an unsuccessful candidate in that year's Democratic Party primary election when she sought renomination. Although she won the popular vote in a landslide due to strong support from the Black vote, Georgia's county unit system—in effect for certain Congressional primaries as well as state-wide elections—denied her the nomination, as she won Fulton County's six county unit votes yet narrowly lost DeKalb County and its six county unit votes, as well as Rockdale County's two county unit votes. She was then an unsuccessful write-in candidate in the general election.

Mankin's term of office concluded January 3, 1947.

== Later life and death ==
She continued to live in Atlanta after her term of office ended, and she died there on July 25, 1956.

== See also ==
- Women in the United States House of Representatives

== Sources ==
- United States Congress. "Helen Douglas Mankin (id: M000097)". Biographical Directory of the United States Congress.
- Spritzer, Lorraine Nelson. The Belle of Ashby Street: Helen Douglas Mankin and Georgia Politics. Athens: The University of Georgia Press, 1982.
- MANKIN, Helen Douglas, Office of the Historian: Office of Art & Archives, Office of the Clerk
- Helen Douglas Mankin (1894–1956), New Georgia Encyclopedia

U.S. House of Representatives
Preceded by Robert Ramspeck	Member of the U.S. House of Representatives from Georgia's 5th congressional district February 12, 1946 – January 3, 1947	Succeeded by James C. Davis
