= Emily Verdery Battey =

American journalist (1826–1912)

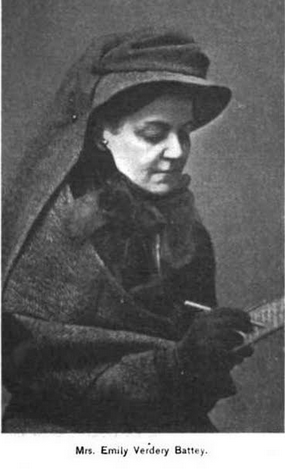
Emily Verdery Battey, from an 1895 publication.

Emily Verdery Battey (November 1826 — November 1912) was an American journalist who was one of the earliest salaried women reporters in the United States. Most of her career was spent in New York.

== Biography ==
Emily Verdery was born in Belair, near Augusta, Georgia. She married a physician, George Magruder Battey, who died in 1856.

It was shortly after the Civil War that Battey began writing for several Georgia newspapers and became a traveling correspondent for the Ladies Home Gazette, which was edited by her brother-in-law. Around 1870, she moved to New York, where she did editorial work and wrote for a range of periodicals, including the Morning Telegraph, the New York Star, the New York Herald, and Harper's Magazine. Harper's, for example, published a story she wrote that required her to climb around among the steeples of New York's churches.

The New York Sun in particular often printed special articles and editorials by Battey. The Sun's editor, Charles Anderson Dana, thought highly of her, and in 1875 he offered her a salaried staff position at his paper. Battey took the position and remained at the Sun until 1890. One of the earliest salaried women reporters in the United States, she wrote on women's rights, general news, fashion, and religion. She was referred to as the "female Nestor of the New York Press", and in her day she was called one of the top women writers from Georgia, along with Mary Edwards Bryan.

During her 15 years at the Sun, she also wrote under various pen names for other newspapers around the country as well as for several syndicates. Through her work at the Sun, she became very knowledgeable about the history of women's organizations, the temperance movement, and other aspects of the social and political history of American women in the 19th century. She later spoke about her experiences in journalism in a lecture entitled "The Woman's Century".

Around 1891, her health broke down and she had to give up her newspaper work. She opened a journalism school in New York, but continuing health issues made her decide to move back to the South to convalesce, bringing the school with her to Atlanta, Georgia. By 1892, her school had several students. While she held that the best place to train reporters was in a newspaper room, she felt that through a journalism school she could teach the basics, including the ability to recognize what makes a good news story.

She died in 1912 and is buried in Decatur Cemetery. Some correspondence related to Battey and her husband forms part of the Robert Battey papers at Emory University. Robert Battey was George Magruder Battey's nephew and ward.
