= Lumpkin Hill =

Mountain in Georgia, United States

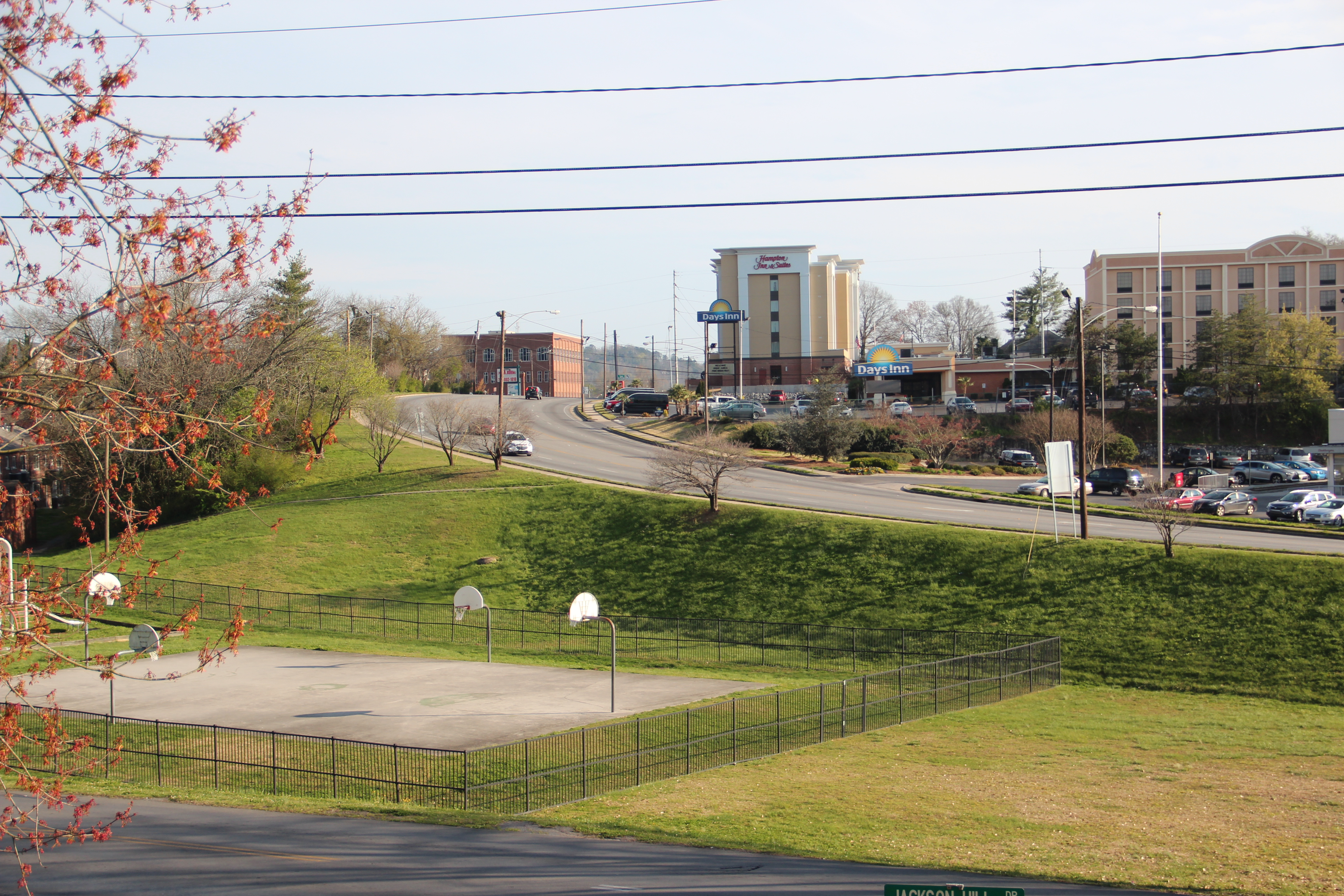
- Georgia State Route 20 goes over the summit of Lumpkin Hill

Highest point
- Elevation: 640 ft (200 m)
- Coordinates: 34.2589824°N 85.1663393°W

Geography
- Location within Georgia
- Location: Rome, Georgia, U.S.
- Topo map(s): USGS Rome North, GA

Climbing
- Easiest route: Drive

Lumpkin Hill is a summit in Rome, Georgia. With an elevation of 640 feet (200 m), Lumpkin Hill is the 914th highest summit in the state of Georgia. The hill is considered to be one of the Seven Hills of Rome, Georgia.

The summit was named for John Henry Lumpkin, who is also buried on the hill. In 1956, Lumpkin Hill's peak was leveled during the construction of Turner McCall Boulevard.
