= Leonidas F. Livingston =

American politician

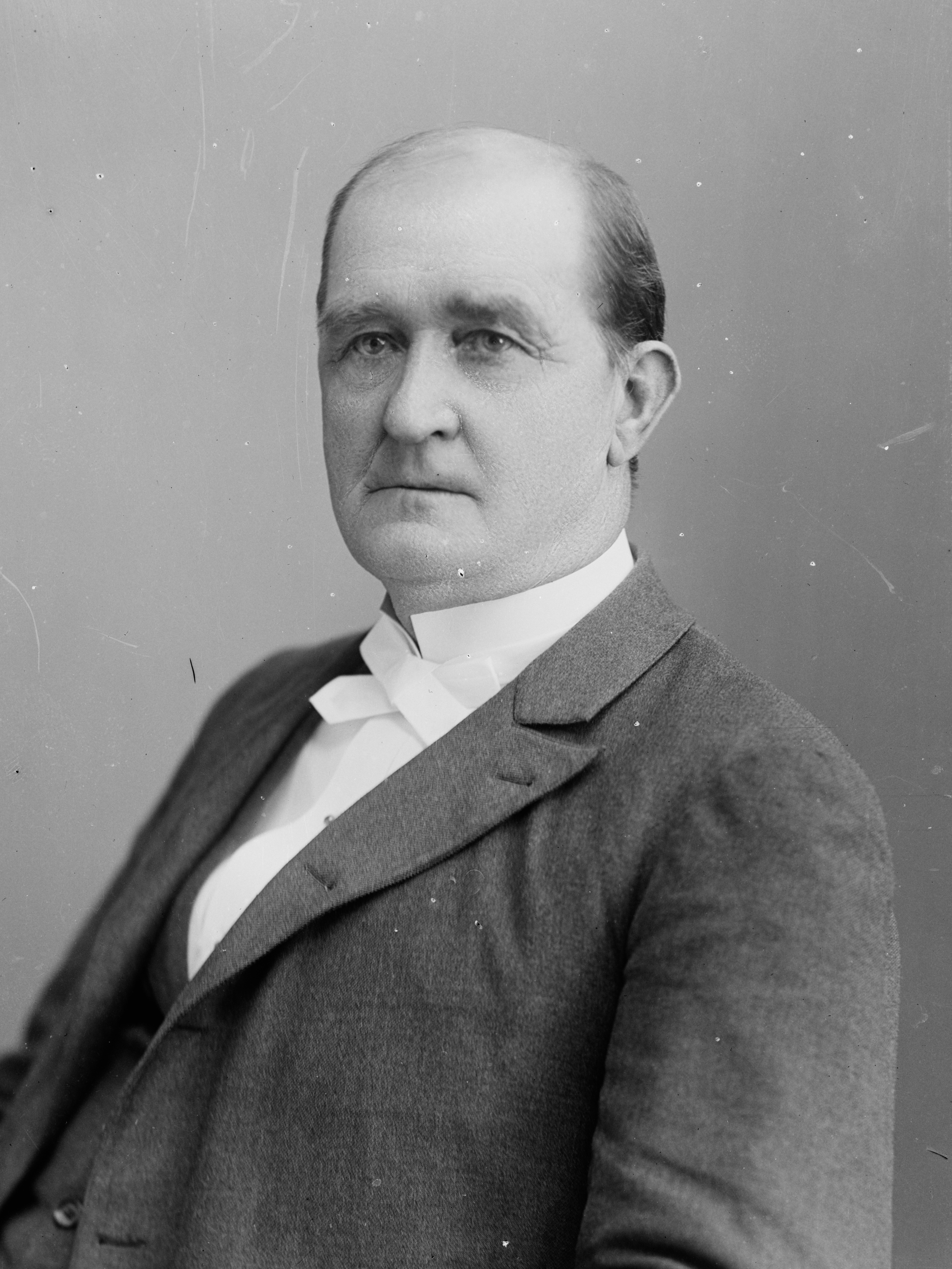

Member of the U.S. House of Representatives from Georgia's 5th district
- In office March 4, 1891 – March 3, 1911
- Preceded by: John D. Stewart
- Succeeded by: William S. Howard

Member of the Georgia House of Representatives
- In office 1876–1877; 1879–1881

Personal details
- Born: Leonidas Felix Livingston; April 3, 1832 Covington, Georgia, U.S.
- Died: February 11, 1912 (aged 79) Washington, D.C., U.S.
- Resting place: Bethany Church Cemetery, Covington, Georgia, U.S.
- Party: Democratic

Military service
- Allegiance: Confederate States of America
- Branch/service: Confederate States Army
- Years of service: August 1861–1865
- Rank: Private

Leonidas Felix Livingston (April 3, 1832 – February 11, 1912) was an American Confederate States Army veteran who served 10 terms as a U.S. representative from Georgia from 1891 to 1911.

== Early life and political involvement ==
Born near Covington, Georgia, Livingston attended the common schools, and engaged in agricultural pursuits.

=== Civil War ===
He entered the Confederate States Army as a private in August 1861 and served throughout the American Civil War.

=== Early career ===
He resumed agricultural pursuits in Newton County, Georgia, serving as member of the Georgia House of Representatives in 1876, 1877, and 1879 to 1881, and in the Georgia State Senate in 1882 and 1883. He served as vice president of the Georgia State Agricultural Society for eleven years and president four years, and as president of the Georgia State Alliance for three years.

== U.S. Congress ==
Livingston was elected as a Democrat to the Fifty-second and to the nine succeeding Congresses (March 4, 1891 – March 3, 1911). He was an unsuccessful candidate for renomination in 1910.

== Later years and death ==
He again engaged in agricultural pursuits in Newton County. He died in Washington, D.C., on February 11, 1912, and was interred in Bethany Church Cemetery near Covington.

U.S. House of Representatives
Preceded by John D. Stewart	Member of the U.S. House of Representatives from Georgia's 5th congressional district March 4, 1891 – March 3, 1911	Succeeded by William S. Howard
