= Ponce de Leon Court Historic District =

Historic district in Georgia, United States

Coordinates: 33.7764°N 84.2908°W

- U.S. National Register of Historic Places
- U.S. Historic district
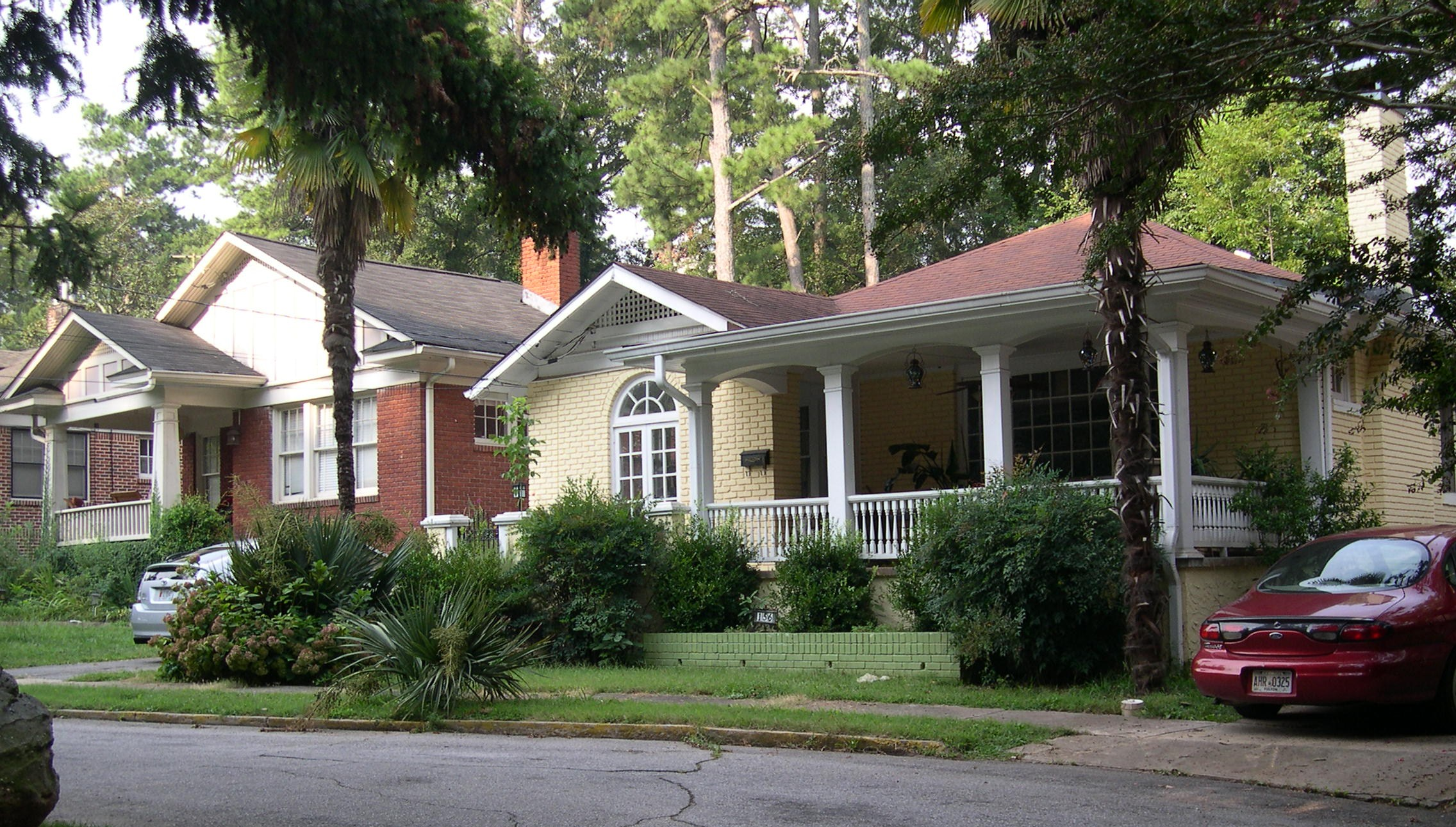
- Ponce de Leon Court Historic District

- Location within Atlanta Location within Georgia Location within the United States
- NRHP reference No.: 11000774
- Added to NRHP: November 2, 2011

The Ponce de Leon Court Historic District consists of a single cul-de-sac located immediately east of downtown Decatur, Georgia.

== Description ==
The street is accessed off of East Ponce de Leon Avenue, a historic road that runs east from Atlanta, Georgia through Decatur. Historic Decatur Cemetery is located to the north, and affluent Glennwood Estates, developed in 1927, and Glennwood elementary school border Ponce de Leon Court on the east.

Ponce de Leon Court is a local historic district in the city of Decatur, and was listed in the Georgia Register of Historic Places in June 2010. It was listed in the National Register of Historic Places on November 2, 2011. The single-street district includes approximately 26 parcels, and was based on a subdivision plat developed by John L. Womack in the 1920s. Womack reportedly wanted homes on this street to remind him of the tropics, so he planted both palm trees and banana trees. The palm trees flourished, but the banana trees died. In the twenty-first century, residents successfully reintroduced banana trees on the north end of the street thanks to a change in the microclimate. The Womack family still owned property on the court when it was designated a historic district.

The closely spaced homes on the narrow street are within walking distance of downtown Decatur, and were constructed in an era when developments did not plan adequately for the automobile. The sense of scale and detail created a strong sense of community, and resulted in this street being recognized as a unique asset in Decatur. Ponce de Leon Court primarily includes 1920s-era American Craftsman bungalows, but also has a few historic multi-family homes. Both the single and multi-family structures, as well as historic palm trees, have remained largely intact from the era when they were built.

The street consists entirely of homes. There are no churches, businesses, or apartment blocks.

== Notes ==
- Clark, Caroline McKinney. The story of Decatur, 1823-1899. Dekalb Historical Society (1996).
- Meeting Minutes, Decatur City Commission, February 21, 2006.
- Price, Vivian. Historic DeKalb County: An Illustrated History (Georgia Heritage Series). Historical Publishing Network (2007).
