= Leslie J. Steele =

American politician

Leslie Jasper Steele (November 21, 1868 – July 24, 1929) was an American politician and lawyer who served one term in the United States House of Representatives from 1927 to 1929.

== Early life and education ==
Steele was born in Decatur, DeKalb County, Georgia to Michael A. and Martha Lucinda Smith Steele, Georgia, and graduated from Oxford College of Emory University in 1893. He taught school from 1893 to 1898, then attended and graduated from the University of Georgia (UGA) School of Law in Athens in 1899 with a Bachelor of Laws (LL.B.) degree and was admitted to the state bar that same year.

== Marriage and family ==
On November 6, 1904, he married Rubie Mae Sprayberry, the daughter of John G. and Lula V. Simpson Sprayberry, born 27 July 1885 Henry County, Georgia and died 23 May 1967 Decatur, DeKalb County, Georgia and was buried on the right-hand side of her husband. From this marriage there were eight children.

== Career ==
Steele began practicing in Decatur. He served on the DeKalb County Board of Education from 1902 to 1921 and was elected as the Mayor of Decatur, Georgia in 1915 and served in that capacity until 1920.

=== State legislature ===
In 1915, Steele was elected to the Georgia House of Representatives in the Georgia General Assembly and served in that seat until 1919. After his state congressional service, Steele serve as both city and county attorney from 1921 through 1925.

=== Congress ===
In 1926, Steele was elected to the United States House of Representatives as a Democrat representing Georgia's 5th congressional district in the 70th United States Congress.

=== Death and burial ===
He was elected to one additional term; however, he died while serving that second term in Washington, D.C., on July 24, 1929, at Garfield Memorial Hospital.

He was buried in the Steele Family Plot at Decatur City Cemetery in the city of Decatur.

== See also ==
- List of members of the United States Congress who died in office (1900–1949)

U.S. House of Representatives
Preceded by William D. Upshaw	Member of the U.S. House of Representatives from Georgia's 5th congressional district March 4, 1927 – July 24, 1929	Succeeded by Robert Ramspeck
