= Elijah W. Chastain =

American politician

Elijah Webb Chastain

Member of the U.S. House of Representatives from Georgia's 5th district
- In office March 4, 1851 – March 3, 1855
- Preceded by: Thomas C. Hackett
- Succeeded by: John Henry Lumpkin

Personal details
- Born: September 25, 1813 Near Pickens, South Carolina
- Died: April 9, 1874 (aged 60) Dalton, Georgia
- Party: Democratic
- Profession: Lawyer, Politician

Military service
- Allegiance: Confederate States of America
- Branch/service: Confederate States Army
- Years of service: 1861–1865
- Rank: Lieutenant Colonel
- Unit: 1st Georgia Regulars
- Battles/wars: American Civil War

Elijah Webb Chastain (September 25, 1813 – April 9, 1874) was an American politician, soldier and lawyer.

== Biography ==
Chastain was born near Pickens, South Carolina, in 1813. His family moved to Habersham, Georgia, in 1821. During the Seminole Wars, he served as a captain and a colonel. After receiving admission to the state bar in 1849, Chastain began practice in Blairsville, Georgia. In 1811, Chastain moved to Milledgeville, Georgia.

Elected to represent Georgia's 5th congressional district in the United States House of Representatives as a Unionist during the 32nd United States Congress, Chastain won reelection as a Democrat to an additional term in the 33rd Congress and served in Congress from March 4, 1851, to March 3, 1855.

Chastain was delegate to the Georgia secession convention in Milledgeville in 1861 which passed the Ordinance of Secession. He served as lieutenant colonel in the Confederate States Army as part of the First Georgia Regiment during the American Civil War. During that time he was also Georgia's attorney for the Western and Atlantic Railroad in 1860 and 1861. Chastain died near Dalton, Georgia, on April 9, 1874, and was buried in his family cemetery near Morganton, Georgia.

== See also ==
- List of signers of the Georgia Ordinance of Secession

== Notes ==
U.S. House of Representatives
Preceded by Thomas C. Hackett	Member of the U.S. House of Representatives from Georgia's 5th congressional district March 4, 1851 – March 3, 1855	Succeeded by John Henry Lumpkin
