= The Sunny South (magazine) =

Newspaper in Atlanta, Georgia

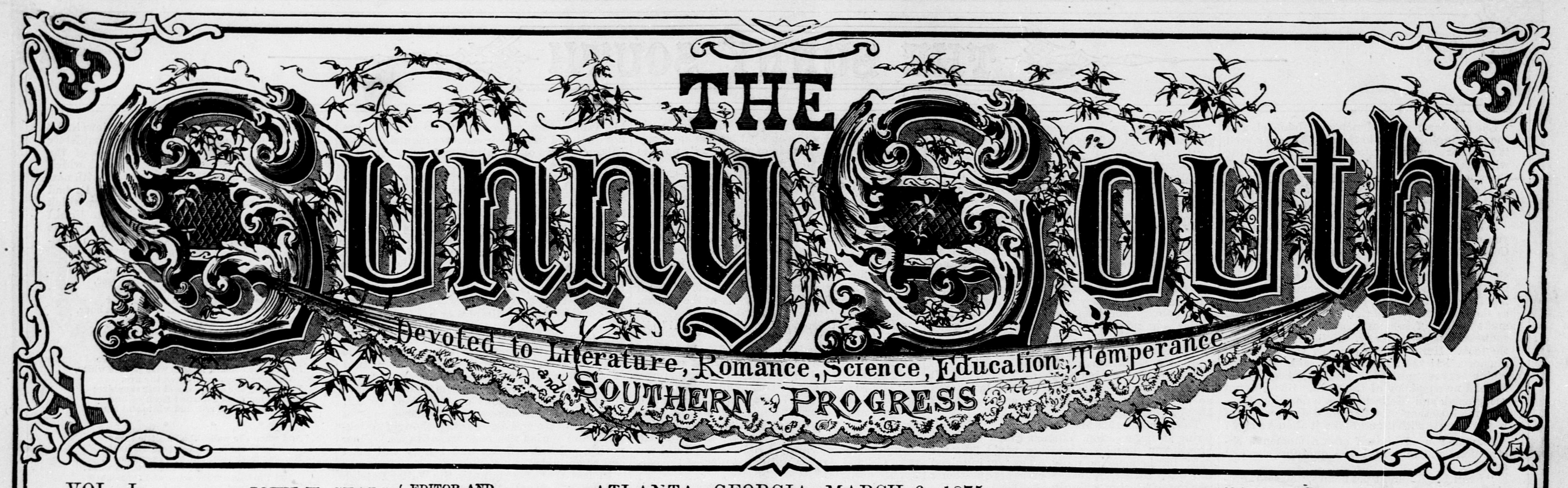
Banner of The Sunny South newspaper

The Sunny South was a weekly literary magazine published in Atlanta from 1874 to 1907.

Colonel John H. Seals began publishing the Sunny South on November 7, 1913. The paper featured prominent poetry and fiction, and covered news stories throughout Georgia. Clark Howell, C.C. Nicholls, and James K. Holliday purchased the paper in April 1892. The following year, the paper was published as supplement to the Sunday editions of the Atlanta Constitution. In 1895, the Sunny South became the first publication in Atlanta to endorse the cause of suffrage for women. author Joel Chandler Harris absorbed the Sunny South into his new publication, the Uncle Remus Magazine, in May 1907.

Mary Edwards Bryan wrote for it.
