= Atlanta Times =

- Type: Daily newspaper
- Format: Broadsheet
- Publisher: James C. Davis
- President: Arthur P. Jackson
- Editor: Luke Greene
- Associate editor: Frank Veale
- Managing editor: Luther Thigpen
- General manager: Irwin M. Orner
- Founded: June 12, 1964; 61 years ago
- Ceased publication: August 31, 1965; 60 years ago
- Language: English
- Country: United States
- Circulation: 75,000 daily
- OCLC number: 9614138

The Atlanta Times was a short-lived conservative daily newspaper published in the early 1960s in Atlanta, Georgia. The first major effort at a new paper in the Atlanta area since 1903, it was launched in mid-1964 by former U.S. congressman James C. Davis to advance the cause of racial segregation in the United States and to combat "radicalism", and had ceased publication by September 1965. Davis had spent three years raising money for the venture, and within months of its establishment, the Times faced problems with both finances and management. The paper aspired to a circulation of about 125,000 but achieved only 75,000, and reportedly lost US$3 million. It failed to attract major department stores as advertisers, and readers remained more loyal to established papers like the Atlanta Journal and the Atlanta Constitution than anticipated. A failed effort by the board of the Times to expand the paper state-wide ultimately caused its ruin.

The first issue of the Atlanta Times was 120 pages and was published on June 12, 1964. Luke Greene was its editor. The Times purchased a used printing press from the New York World-Telegram.

Pauline Phillips attended the paper's opening ceremony, where she signed freshly-printed issues.
