= Nathaniel J. Hammond =

American politician

Nathaniel Job Hammond
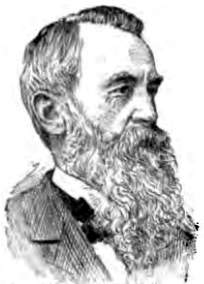

Member of the United States House of Representatives from Georgia's 5th congressional district
- In office March 4, 1879 – March 3, 1887
- Preceded by: Milton A. Candler
- Succeeded by: John D. Stewart

Georgia Attorney General
- In office 1872–1877

Personal details
- Born: December 26, 1833 Elbert County, Georgia
- Died: April 20, 1899 (aged 65) Atlanta, Georgia
- Resting place: Oakland Cemetery
- Party: Democratic
- Spouse: Laura Lewis
- Profession: Lawyer

Nathaniel Job Hammond (December 26, 1833 – April 20, 1899) was a jurist and politician from the American state of Georgia. A Democrat, Hammond was the attorney general of Georgia from 1872 to 1877, before serving in the United States House of Representatives from 1879 to 1887.

== Early years and education ==
Hammond was born in Elbert County, Georgia on December 26, 1833, to Amos Worrill and Eliza Caroline (Hudson) Hammond. He graduated from the University of Georgia in Athens in 1852 at the age of 19, with a Bachelor of Arts. He was admitted to the state bar the next year and began practicing law in Atlanta, Georgia in partnership with his father.

== Legal career ==
In 1861, Hammond was elected as the solicitor general of the Atlanta circuit and served in that position until 1865. In 1867, he became a reporter of the Supreme Court of Georgia and served in that capacity until 1872 when he became Georgia's Attorney General (1872–1877). Hammond also served as a trustee of the University of Georgia beginning in 1871 and remained on the board until his death in 1899. He was chairman his last few years of service and authored a book entitled The University of Georgia and the Constitution as well as The University of Georgia: A Short History of its Endowment and Legal Status.

Hammond was a member and noted leader of the Georgia constitutional conventions in 1865 and 1877 that were tasked with creating a new state constitution. He also served as president of the board of trustees of the Atlanta College of Physicians and Surgeons.

== Political service ==
In 1878, Hammond won election to the United States House of Representatives and was re-elected for three more terms (1880, 1882, and 1884) before losing his seat in 1886 to John D. Stewart.

== Later years and death ==
Hammond married Laura Lewis in 1858. After his election defeat in 1886 he resumed his career as a lawyer. He died in Atlanta on April 20, 1899, and was buried in that city's Oakland Cemetery.

U.S. House of Representatives
Preceded by Milton A. Candler	U.S. Representative of Georgia's 5th congressional district March 4, 1879 – March 3, 1887	Succeeded by John D. Stewart
