= Senator Prince (disambiguation) =

Oliver H. Prince (1787–1837) was a U.S. Senator from Georgia from 1828 to 1829. Senator Prince may also refer to:

- Charles H. Prince (1837–1912), Maine State Senate
- Frederick O. Prince (1818–1899), Massachusetts State Senate
- Job Prince (1795–1875), Maine State Senate
- John Dyneley Prince (1868–1945), New Jersey State Senate
- L. Bradford Prince (1840–1922), New York State Senate
- Noah Prince (1797–1872), Maine State Senate
- William Prince (politician) (1772–1824), Indiana State Senate
