= Milton A. Candler =

American politician

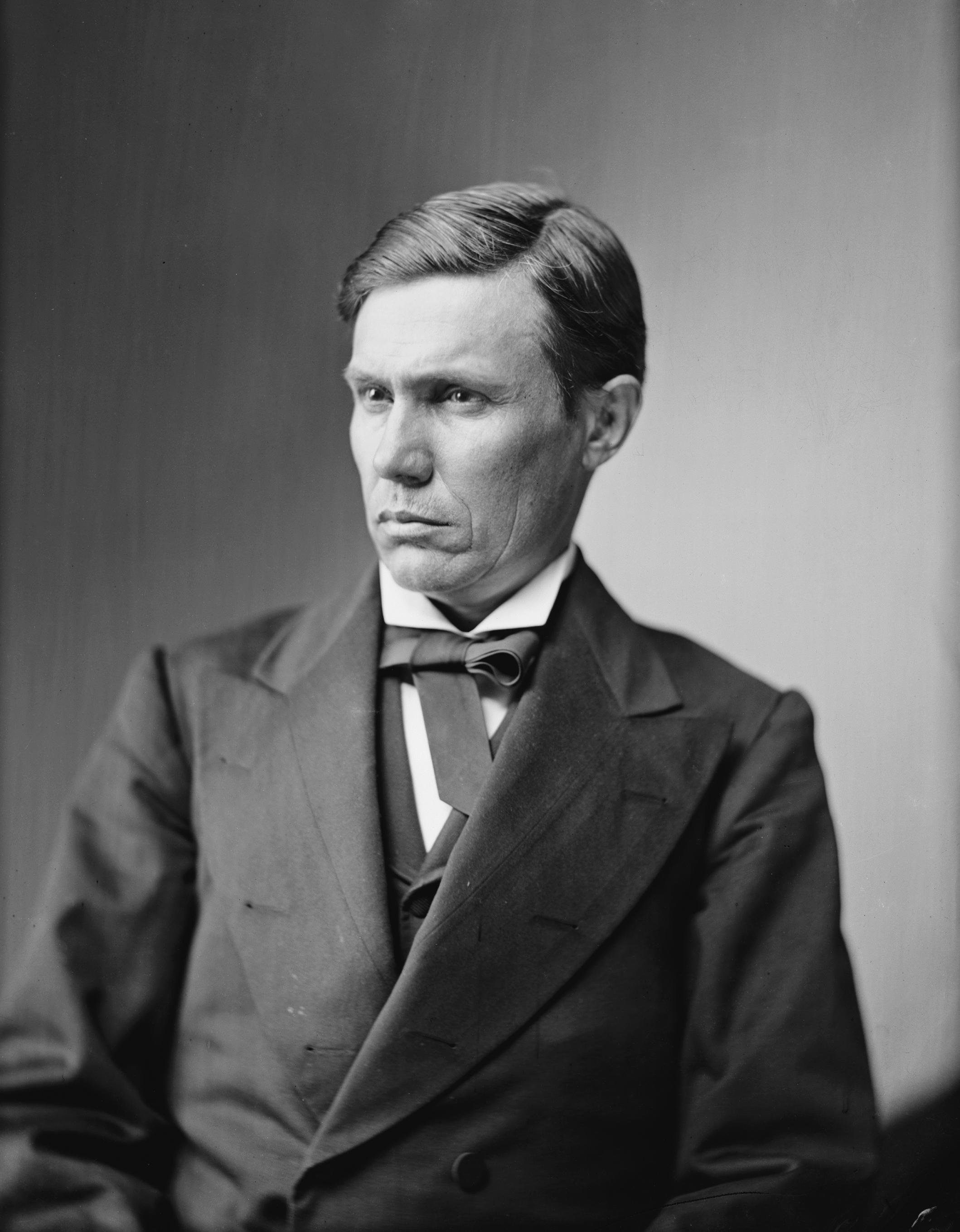

Member of the U.S. House of Representatives from Georgia's 5th district
- In office March 4, 1875 – March 3, 1879
- Preceded by: James C. Freeman
- Succeeded by: Nathaniel Job Hammond

Member of the Georgia Senate from DeKalb County
- In office 1868–1872

Member of the Georgia State Constitutional Convention from DeKalb County
- In office 1865–1868

Member of the Georgia House of Representatives from DeKalb County
- In office 1861–1863

Personal details
- Born: January 11, 1837 Campbellton, Campbell County, Georgia, U.S.
- Died: August 8, 1909 (aged 72) Decatur, Georgia, U.S.
- Resting place: Decatur Cemetery
- Party: Democratic
- Spouse: Elizabeth Murphey
- Education: University of Georgia
- Occupation: Lawyer, politician, soldier

Military service
- Allegiance: Confederate States of America
- Branch/service: Confederate States Army
- Years of service: 1863–1865 (CSA)
- Rank: Captain, 10th Georgia Cavalry
- Battles/wars: American Civil War

Milton Anthony Candler (January 11, 1837 – August 8, 1909) was an American lawyer, Confederate officer and politician from an influential Georgia family of businessmen and politicians. He served two terms in the U.S. House of Representatives.

== Early and family life ==
Candler was born in Campbellton (then the seat of Campbell County but since 1932 in Fulton County, Georgia). He was the first child of the former Martha Bernetta Beall (1819-1897), of Bartow County, and her husband, Samuel Charles Candler (1809-1873), of Columbia County, who served in both houses of the Georgia legislature. His great-grandfather, Col. William Candler (1730-1784), had led Georgia troops during the American Revolutionary War and later served as a state legislator. His uncle Ezekiel S. Candler (1815-1869) was Georgia's comptroller general (1849–54).

Milton Candler had a dozen siblings, including brothers Ezekiel Candler (1838-1915; a teacher by 1860), Noble D. Candler (1841-1887; noted as insane on the 1860 census), William B. Candler (1847-1928; who became Villa Rica's mayor), Asa Griggs Candler (1851-1929; who built the Coca Cola Company), Rev. Warren Akin Candler (1857-1941; who became President of Emory University), Charles C. Candler (b. 1855) and John S. Candler (1861-1941).

After Milton's birth, his father soon moved the family to Villa Rica, a city in Carroll and Douglas Counties in western Georgia, after the local Creek Indians were expelled on the Trail of Tears. S.C. Candler owned slaves in Carroll County in 1840 and 12 slaves by 1850. By 1860, S. C. Candler farmed and owned $5,700 in real estate as well as $13,250 in personal property, which included 17 slaves, and he leased another 19 slaves from D.B. Chapman.

As firstborn son, Milton A. Candler received a private education, then graduated from the University of Georgia in Athens in 1854. He married Elizabeth Murphey, daughter of Georgia' U.S. Congressman Charles Murphey in 1857, and they had twelve children, which included: Charles Murphey Candler (1857–1935), Samuel Charles Candler (1859–1924), Milton Anthony Candler Jr.(1861–1893), Laura Eliza Candler (1864–1880), Florence Candler Cowles (1867–1940), Maury Lee Candler (1873–1889), Claude Candler McKinney (1877–1972), and Ruth Candler Pope (1880–1960).

== Career ==
After studying law and being admitted to the bar in 1856, Candler began his law practice in Cassville, then the county seat of Bartow County, Georgia, where his mother's family and Congressman Cooper lived. The following year Candler moved to Decatur the county seat of DeKalb County, Georgia, where he lived most of the rest of his life.

== American Civil War ==
Shortly before the American Civil War began, his father-in-law, former Representative Charles Murphey died in January 1861. In his honor, the Candler family outfitted a company of Confederate troops from DeKalb County, which was named the "Murphey Guards". DeKalb County voters elected Candler to the Georgia State House of Representatives, where he served from 1861 through 1863. In 1863, Candler accepted a commission as captain of the 10th Regiment Georgia Cavalry, State Guards, a battalion organized in August 1863, fighting with the Confederate States Army to serve for six months as local defense in a portion of the State west of the Chattahoochee River as mounted infantry.

== Postwar years ==
Candler was a delegate to Georgia's state constitutional convention in 1865, and later the Democratic National Convention in 1872, 1876 and 1896. He served in the Georgia Senate from 1868 until 1872. In 1868, Candler was instrumental in the illegal expulsion of 33 newly elected African Americans to the Georgia Legislature. With the help of President Ulysses Grant and Frederick Douglass they were finally reinstated in 1870. In 1874, voters from Georgia's 5th congressional district elected Candler to the United States House of Representatives, defeating Republican James C. Freeman. Candler won re-election in 1876, but ultimately withdrew from the 1878 race and was succeeded by fellow ex-Confederate, and former state attorney general Nathaniel Job Hammond.

Candler returned to his law practice in Decatur, and continued his political involvement, but less directly. His son Charles Murphey Candler became a lawyer and served in both houses of the Georgia legislature, starting in 1886, and also served on the state Railroad Commission (1909-1922). His younger brother John S. Candler became a Justice of the Georgia Supreme Court (1902-1906) (as did a more distant relative Thomas S. Candler from 1945 to 1966). His cousin Allen D. Candler, also a Confederate officer but from Lumpkin County, Georgia, was elected Georgia's governor in 1898. His lawyer nephew, Ezekiel S. Candler Jr., was elected to the U.S. Congress from Mississippi and served 1901–1921.

== Death and legacy ==
Milton A. Candler died in Decatur in 1909, survived by his widow (who died 8 years later), children and grandchildren. He was buried in the family plot in Decatur Cemetery. A street in Decatur is named after him.

U.S. House of Representatives
Preceded by James C. Freeman	U.S. Representative of Georgia's 5th congressional district March 4, 1875 – March 3, 1879	Succeeded by Nathaniel Job Hammond
