= Dudley M. DuBose =

American politician

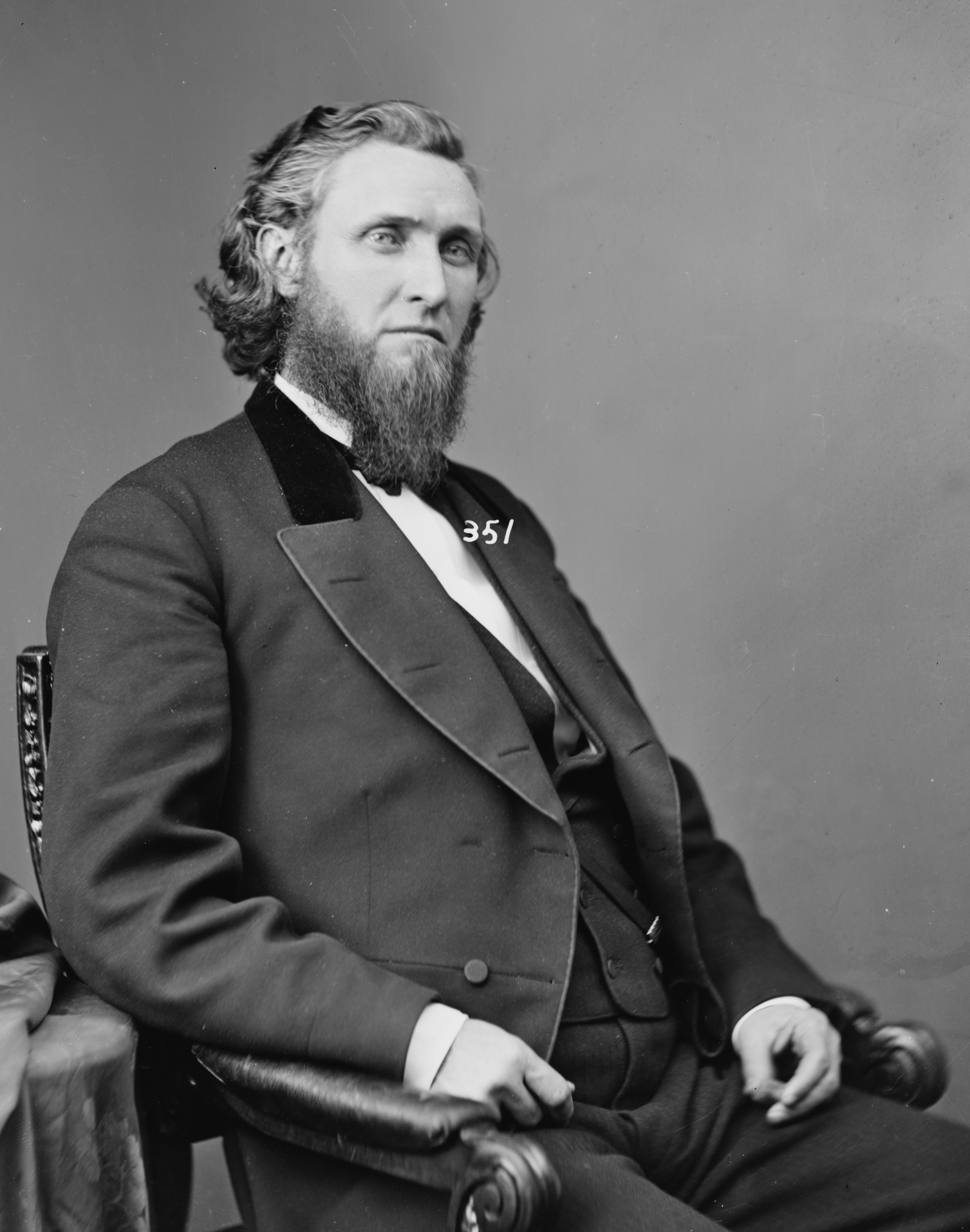

Member of the U.S. House of Representatives from Georgia's 5th district
- In office March 4, 1871 – March 3, 1873
- Preceded by: Stephen A. Corker
- Succeeded by: James C. Freeman

Personal details
- Born: Dudley McIver DuBose; October 28, 1834 Memphis, Tennessee, U.S.
- Died: March 2, 1883 (aged 48) Washington, Georgia, U.S.
- Party: Democratic
- Spouse: Sallie Toombs
- Children: Robert Toombs DuBose; Camille DuBose; Dudley DuBose; Louisa Toombs DuBose
- Occupation: Lawyer, politician

Military service
- Allegiance: Confederate States of America
- Branch/service: Confederate States Army
- Years of service: 1861–1865
- Rank: Brigadier General
- Commands: 15th Georgia Infantry Regiment; DuBose's Brigade
- Battles/wars: American Civil War

Dudley McIver DuBose (October 28, 1834 – March 2, 1883) was an American lawyer, Confederate field officer and politician. He rose to the rank of Brigadier General in the Confederate Army during the American Civil War. Afterward, he later served one term in the United States House of Representatives from Georgia, 1871–1873.

== Early and family life ==
Dudley McIver DuBose was born on October 28, 1834, near Memphis, Tennessee, to Alfred Bishop Cassells DuBose (born 1804) (also known as A.B.C. DuBose) and his second wife, the former Camilla Dunn, daughter of a local doctor. They had married the previous November at the Methodist Church. Their additional children included sons Alfred Jr. (born 1838), Julius (born 1840) and Swepson (born 1858); and daughters Elizabeth (born 1835), Catherine (born 1841), Harriet (born 1843), and Mytis DuBose (born 1850).

The family's DuBose ancestors were Protestant Huguenots from France who had immigrated to South Carolina, settling in the midlands, where A.B.C. DuBose was born. There they developed and operated plantations, dependent on the labor of enslaved African Americans. By 1800 the DuBose planters cultivated mostly cotton as a commodity crop.

In 1850, A.B.C. DuBose was living in Shelby County, Tennessee, where he owned a plantation and 84 slaves.

Dudley DuBose attended the University of Mississippi at Oxford in the 1850s. He returned to Tennessee, where he studied law and graduated from Cumberland University in 1856. He began to practice law in Memphis.

On April 15, 1858, in Washington, D.C., DuBose married Sallie Toombs (1835–1866), a distant cousin. She was the last surviving child of United States Senator Robert Toombs, a lawyer, planter, and slaveholder from Wilkes County, Georgia. Initially a Unionist, Toombs became an ardent secessionist.

By 1860, after Dudley DuBose was established on his own, he moved with his family to Arkansas for a time. There he had a plantation and supervised the work through an overseer and slave labor. DuBose and his wife had sons Robert Toombs DuBose (1859–1929), who became a minister; Dudley DuBose, who became an attorney and judge in Montana; and daughters Camilla and Julie.

During the war, DuBose commanded a regiment from Tennessee. A South Carolina cousin, William Porcher DuBose, became chaplain of his Tennessee regiment in 1863.

== Early career ==
Admitted to the bar in 1857, Dudley DuBose began his private legal practice in Memphis, Tennessee. He soon expanded it to Georgia. Before the American Civil War, as discussed below, he and his wife moved to Augusta, Georgia. DuBose had a law practice in the former state capitol on the Savannah River near the South Carolina border.

== Civil War ==
DuBose volunteered to fight in the Confederate States Army during the Civil War, rising as an officer after being commissioned as a lieutenant in the 15th Georgia Infantry Regiment. His regiment was initially assigned to a brigade led by his father-in-law, Brigadier General Robert A. Toombs. The regiment fought in the Seven Days Battles, the Second Battle of Bull Run, and the Battle of Antietam.

In January 1863 DuBose was promoted to the rank of colonel, and commanded the regiment. DuBose and his Georgians served under Brigadier General Henry L. Benning in Major General John B. Hood's division of James Longstreet's corps, including in the Siege of Suffolk. At the Battle of Gettysburg on July 2, 1863, his regiment participated in Hood's attack on the Union III Corps, fighting at Devil's Den.

In September 1863 DuBose returned with his troops to Tennessee. He led his regiment at the Battle of Chickamauga, where he was wounded, and later fought in the Knoxville Campaign.

Longstreet's corps returned to Virginia in 1864. DuBose saw combat at the Battle of the Wilderness, in May 1864, and temporarily led Benning's brigade in the Battle of Spotsylvania Court House and the Battle of Cold Harbor. On November 16, DuBose was promoted to brigadier general and command of a brigade in Major General Joseph B. Kershaw's division, taking the place of Brigadier General William T. Wofford. Gen. DuBose led his brigade in the later stages of the Siege of Petersburg and the Appomattox Campaign. On April 6, 1865, as the war was nearly ended and while still serving in Kershaw's division, DuBose was among many Confederates captured during the Battle of Sailor's Creek, days before Major General Lee surrendered the Army of Northern Virginia at Appomattox Court House.

His father-in-law Robert Toombs left Washington, D.C., to return to Georgia. He was appointed as the Confederate Secretary of State, and became a strong critic of Confederate President Jefferson Davis. After the Confederate surrender, Toombs fled the United States with his wife to avoid arrest and trial.

== Postbellum career ==
Following the war, the DuBose family moved to his wife's hometown, Washington, Wilkes County, Georgia. He became deeply involved in Democratic Party politics, and was a statewide leader after the Reconstruction era, aided by his powerful father-in-law, Robert Toombs.

Sallie Toombs DuBose died in 1866, at age 30. Her mother returned to Georgia to help the widowed DuBose run his household and care for her young grandchildren. Months later her husband Toombs also returned to the US.

Robert A. Toombs avoided being arrested and tried for his role as a Confederate leader during the war. After his return in 1867, he resumed his legal practice and began to regain political power, although he never applied for a presidential pardon (as did other former Confederate statesmen). Former Confederate leaders were temporarily prohibited from voting or holding office, but Toombs ultimately led the state's Democrats, with the aid of longtime friend Alexander H. Stevens, who became governor of Georgia, and his son-in-law DuBose.

Following controversy concerning Confederate veteran Stephen A. Corker of Burke County, mostly white Georgians elected DuBose in 1870 as a Democrat to the Forty-second Congress. There was increasing unrest and violence around elections as Democrats sought to suppress the black Republican vote. DuBose served one term, from March 4, 1871 – March 3, 1873. He lost in 1872 to Republican James C. Freeman of Spalding County, Georgia. Freeman served only one term.

After his Congressional term ended, DuBose resumed his legal practice for a decade, mostly with his father-in-law. Toombs took pride in being an "unreconstructed" Confederate, and had regained considerable political power in Georgia by 1872.

== Death ==
Dudley DuBose suffered a stroke in 1883 while traveling. He was returned to his home in Washington, Georgia, where he died on March 2, 1883.

== See also ==
- List of American Civil War generals (Confederate)

U.S. House of Representatives
Preceded by Stephen A. Corker	Member of the U.S. House of Representatives from Georgia's 5th congressional district March 4, 1871 – March 3, 1873	Succeeded by James C. Freeman
