= Stephen A. Corker =

American politician

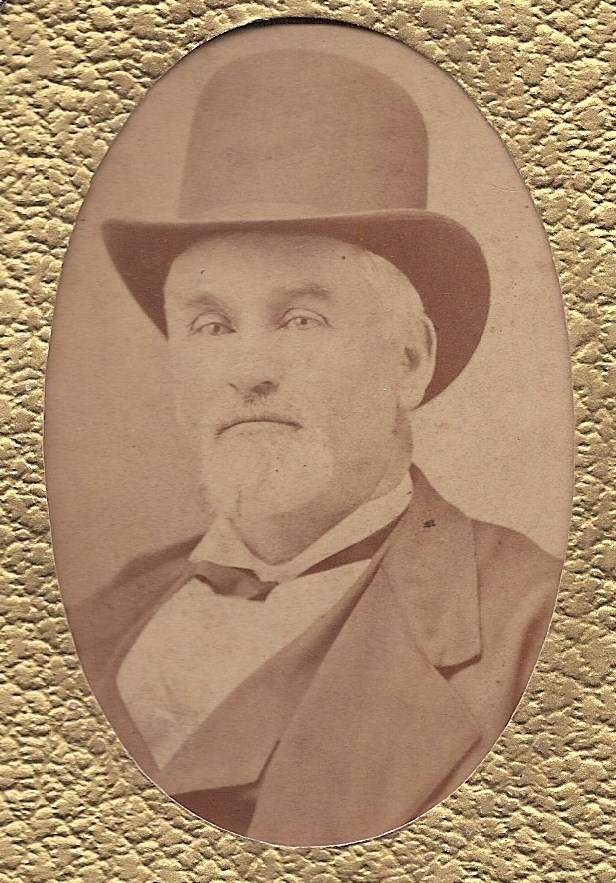
- Reconstruction era photograph

Member of the U.S. House of Representatives from Georgia's 5th district
- In office January 24, 1871 – March 3, 1871
- Preceded by: Charles H. Prince
- Succeeded by: Dudley M. DuBose

Member of the Georgia House of Representatives

Personal details
- Born: Stephen Alfestus Corker; May 7, 1830 Waynesboro, Georgia, U.S.
- Died: October 18, 1879 (aged 49) Waynesboro, Georgia, U.S.
- Resting place: Confederate Cemetery at Waynesboro
- Party: Democratic (1850s–1878); Greenback Party (1878–death)
- Spouse: Margaret Myrtice Palmer
- Children: Palmer Lanier Corker; Stephen Alfestus Corker, Jr. Frank Grattan Corker
- Occupation: Attorney

Stephen Alfestus Corker (May 7, 1830 – October 18, 1879) was a lawyer and Confederate Civil War veteran who served briefly as a U.S. Representative from Georgia in early 1871. He was a plantation owner and enslaver.

== Early life ==
Stephen A. Corker was born near Waynesboro, Georgia to Stephen Corker, a prosperous plantation owner, and his wife Salenah Lanier. He attended common schools in the county. When he was about ten years of age his father died. After his father's death his mother married Calvin B. Churchill, a Baptist clergyman. Corker studied law, was admitted to the bar and commenced practice in Waynesboro, Georgia. He married Margaret Myrtice Palmer on October 26, 1859, at Augusta, Georgia. In addition to being a lawyer, he also engaged in agricultural pursuits. The 1860 Federal Census has Corker owning four slaves in addition to $4,000 in real estate and $5,600 in personal estate. Ten years later the value of his estate had grown to $11,000 in real estate and $6,000 in personal estate. He was elected ordinary for Burke County in January 1860.

== Confederate Army ==
Corker enlisted on April 29, 1861, as a Sergeant in Company A, Third Georgia Regiment, Burke Guards at Waynesboro, Georgia. Days later on May 2 his company was mustered into service at Augusta, Georgia. During the war he was promoted to Captain of his company. Corker was captured at the Battle of Gettysburg, July 2, 1863. He was first sent to Fort Delaware and was shortly afterwards sent to Johnson's Island Federal prisoner of war camp in Ohio. He stayed there until he was sent to City Point, Virginia on February 24, 1865, as part of a prisoner of war exchange. He was paroled at Augusta, Georgia on May 19, 1865. His initial fate upon capture was not known by his family. His life as a prisoner of war is documented in a series of letters held by the Hargrett Library of the University of Georgia. After the war, he returned home and resumed the practice of law in Waynesboro and was a judge by the late 1860s.

== Congressional Service ==
In August 1870, Corker was one of thirty-two delegates from Burke County to the State Democratic Convention. In October that year he was nominated for the short term and Dudley M. DuBose was nominated for the long term for Georgia's 5th Congressional district by the Democratic nominating committee at Augusta, Georgia. The short term referred to Congress the vacancy caused by the House of Representatives declaring Congressman Charles H. Prince not entitled to his seat for the Forty-first Congress. Prince and the rest of Congressional Delegation from Georgia had been elected in April 1868 for the last remaining months of the 40th United States Congress and had then attempted to present their same credentials for the next Congress without a subsequent election. The position became vacant on March 3, 1869, while Congress decided the legality of their elections. Congress decided in January 1870 that the members elected in April 1868 were not entitled to the seats for the Forty-First Congress. It was decided that elections for both the remaining portion of Forty-First Congress and the Forty-Second were to be held jointly in December 1870.

Corker's opponent in the election was a Black Republican named Thomas Payce Beard, one of many Black candidates for Congress during Reconstruction. The elections results given by the Georgia Secretary of State were 14,678 for Corker and 9,112 for Beard. The results were contested by Beard. Beard reported that Republicans were compelled through threats of violence to vote for Corker against their wills, that there were numerous incidents of voting fraud, and that Republicans had been beaten, shot at, and maltreated prior to and during the election. Corker denied the allegations and countered that the Republicans were not united behind Beard. Corker presented his credentials to Congress and was seated on January 24, 1871, pending the results of the Elections Committee. A federal investigation into the election began soon afterwards. Testimony was taken by witnesses of the election in the middle of February 1871. One witness, Washington Dawson, recalled Republican voters being threatened with being attacked by the Ku Klux Klan if they did not vote the Democratic ticket, which was not an uncommon occurrence during Reconstruction. Other witnesses reported the election to have been peaceful and fair, and that some Black voters had voted willingly for Corker. The case never came before the Elections Committee. Corker served until the end of his term on March 3, 1871, for a total of thirty-nine days.

== Life After Congress ==
After leaving congress he resumed the practice of law in Waynesboro. In October 1874 Corker was stabbed five times with a penknife by a man named Walker McCatherine following a disagreement about a ruling Corker made related to a bit of property. None of the wounds were serious, and Corker returned to work a few days later. In the 1870s he served as vice-president of the Third Georgia, an organization for veterans from Corker's Confederate Regiment during the war.

In October 1876 he was elected as one of three congressmen for Burke County in the Georgia General Assembly. He served on the Committees on Education during his tenure in office. He was elected to the same position again in November 1877. On September 5 he was nominated by members of the Greenback Party for United States Congress. Days later he resigned from his position in the General Assembly. Newspapers from the time period doubted that he would be elected to congress. He accepted the nomination of the Greenback Party for Representative of Georgia's 1st Congressional district in earl October 1878. The denunciation by Greenback Party of the Democratic Party drew criticism. Corker responded to those questions by claiming one could be an Independent Democrat and also run on the Greenback Party ticket. Critics believed that Corker was trying to get elected to Congress again any way that he could. Rumors claimed that Corker had stayed in Savannah, Georgia during the war and had not fought. These rumors were denounced by his friends and newspapers, but during the campaign he was continuously accused of having abandoned Democracy and allying himself with its opponents. Democrats argued that "If it is Captain Corker this year it will be a negro next time." In an attempt to defeat the Democratic candidate John C. Nicholls, Corker reportedly courted the votes of Republicans, Radicals, and Black voters. Corker lost the election to John C. Nicholls by 3,600 votes.

=== Illness and death ===
After losing the election, his health began to decline. On Saturday October 18, 1879 he was talking to clients at his office in Waynesboro when he suddenly slumped down and was paralyzed on his left side. He died at four o'clock that afternoon at forty-nine years old.

He was a Freemason, a member of the Royal Arcanum, and a member of the Knights of Honor. He was interred in the Confederate Cemetery at Waynesboro. His wife and three sons survived him.

=== Descendant ===
His great-great-grandson, Bob Corker, is a former U.S. Senator from Tennessee.

U.S. House of Representatives
Preceded by Charles H. Prince	Member of the U.S. House of Representatives from Georgia's 5th congressional district January 24, 1871 – March 3, 1871	Succeeded by Dudley M. DuBose
