= Charles H. Prince =

American politician

Member of the Maine Senate from the 3rd district
- In office January 2, 1901 – January 7, 1903 Serving with Joseph F. Stearns
- Preceded by: A. C. Thomas King
- Succeeded by: John M. Philbrook
- Constituency: Oxford County

Member of the U.S. House of Representatives from Georgia's 5th district
- In office July 25, 1868 – March 3, 1869
- Preceded by: John W. H. Underwood (1861)
- Succeeded by: Stephen A. Corker

Personal details
- Born: Charles Henry Prince; May 9, 1837 Buckfield, Maine, U.S.
- Died: April 12, 1912 (aged 74) Buckfield, Maine, U.S.
- Party: Republican
- Spouse: Eunice Ann Atwood (m. 1859)
- Children: 4
- Parent: Noah Prince (father)
- Occupation: Politician; banker; postmaster; merchant

Military service
- Allegiance: United States (Union)
- Branch/service: United States Army; U.S. Volunteers
- Years of service: 1862‍–‍1863
- Rank: Captain
- Unit: 23rd Maine Infantry Regiment
- Battles/wars: American Civil War

Charles Henry Prince (May 9, 1837 – April 3, 1912) was a U.S. representative from Georgia.

== Early life ==
Charles Henry Prince was born in Buckfield, Maine to Noah Prince and Sarah Farrar. His father was a judge and a state politician. Noah Prince served as president of the senate in the Maine Legislature in 1851. Charles Henry Prince attended local schools in Buckfield. After completing his education he engaged in mercantile pursuits. He married Eunice A. Atwood on January 30, 1859. On March 30, 1861 the couple's first son Ellsworth Prince was born. He was named after Colonel Elmer E. Ellsworth. On May 31, 1861 Prince was appointed postmaster of Buckfield, Maine.

== Civil War Service ==
On September 29, 1862 he was appointed as captain of Company C, Twenty-third Regiment, Maine Volunteer Infantry, from September 10, 1862 until the unit was mustered out on July 15, 1863.

== Life in Georgia ==
In 1866, Prince settled in Augusta, Georgia, and worked there initially as a cashier of the Freedman's Savings and Trust Bank in that city, and later as state superintendent of education of the American Missionary Association. His wife was also involved with the A.M.A. as a missionary in Georgia. He also helped arranged aid to the Augusta Institute during its founding years. He served as delegate to the state constitutional convention of 1868.

Upon the re-admission of Georgia to representation, Prince was elected as a Republican to the Fortieth Congress and served from July 25, 1868, to March 3, 1869 for a total of 222 days. He presented his credentials as a Member-elect to the Forty-first Congress but was not permitted to qualify. Prince and the rest of Congressional Delegation from Georgia had been elected in April 1868 for the last remaining months of the 40th United States Congress and had then attempted to present their same credentials for the next Congress without a subsequent election. In January 1870, Congress decided that the members elected in April 1868 were not entitled to election for the Forty-First Congress.

On March 2, 1870 he was appointed the postmaster of Augusta, Georgia. Senator Hannibal Hamlin of Maine was one of the leading figures behind his appointment. He was subsequently reappointed to that same position in 1874 and again in 1878. His reappointment in 1878 was opposed by most of the Georgia delegation to Congress with the exception of Representative Alexander H. Stephens. Critics labelled Prince a carpetbagger. During that time he also served as a delegate to the Republican National Conventions in 1872, 1876, and 1880. While in Georgia he became a friend of former Vice President of the Confederate States of America Alexander H. Stephens despite their political differences.

== Return to Maine ==
In 1882, he returned to Buckfield, Maine and engaged himself in mercantile pursuits, especially in the insurance business and in the manufacture of brushes. He served as member of the Maine State Senate in 1901. Prince died in Buckfield, Maine from heart disease on April 3, 1912. He was interred in Buckfield Village Cemetery. He was survived by his wife and three out of his four children.

U.S. House of Representatives
Preceded by American Civil War	Member of the U.S. House of Representatives from Georgia's 5th congressional district July 25, 1868 – March 3, 1869	Succeeded by Stephen A. Corker
