= Churchill Bridge =

- U.S. National Register of Historic Places
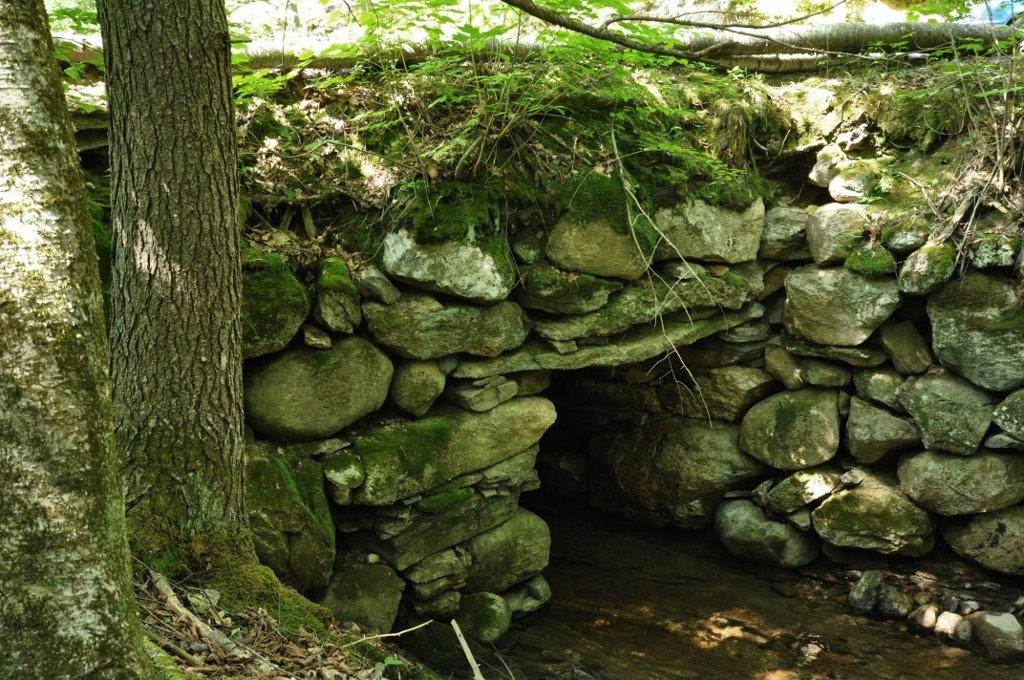

- Location within Maine Location within the United States
- Nearest city: Buckfield, Maine
- Coordinates: 44°14′44″N 70°23′10″W
- Area: less than one acre
- Built: 1797
- Architect: William Churchill
- NRHP reference No.: 94000180
- Added to NRHP: March 17, 1994

The Churchill Bridge is a historic bridge carrying Mountain Road over Bicknell Brook, in a rural corner of Buckfield, Maine. It is one of three documented stone lintel bridges in the state. It is a dry laid rubble stone structure which carries the road over the stream at a height of about 14 feet (4.3 m). The total length of the bridge is about 20 feet (6.1 m), and the clear span over the brook is 5 feet (1.5 m). The span is formed by five massive ledge stones laid on rubble abutments about 7 feet (2.1 m) above the stream. Additional rubble is laid above to form the bed of the gravel roadway. The bridge crosses the stream at a slight angle, so its abutments are extended with wingwalls to the northwest and southeast.

The bridge is believed to have been built around 1797 by William Churchill, whose homestead was located nearby. He apparently built the bridge in exchange for a tax abatement from the town. The town owns the bridge and is responsible for its maintenance. The bridge is a rare survivor; a 1924 survey identified 20 stone bridges in Buckfield alone.

The bridge was listed on the National Register of Historic Places in 1994. At the time of its listing, it had last received substantive maintenance in 1938. Two other stone lintel bridges are listed on the National Register in Maine, which date to the late 18th or early 19th century; they are the Grist Mill Bridge in Lebanon and Thompson's Bridge in Industry.

== See also ==
- National Register of Historic Places listings in Oxford County, Maine
- List of bridges on the National Register of Historic Places in Maine
