= Enoch Hall House =

Historic house in Maine, United States

- U.S. National Register of Historic Places
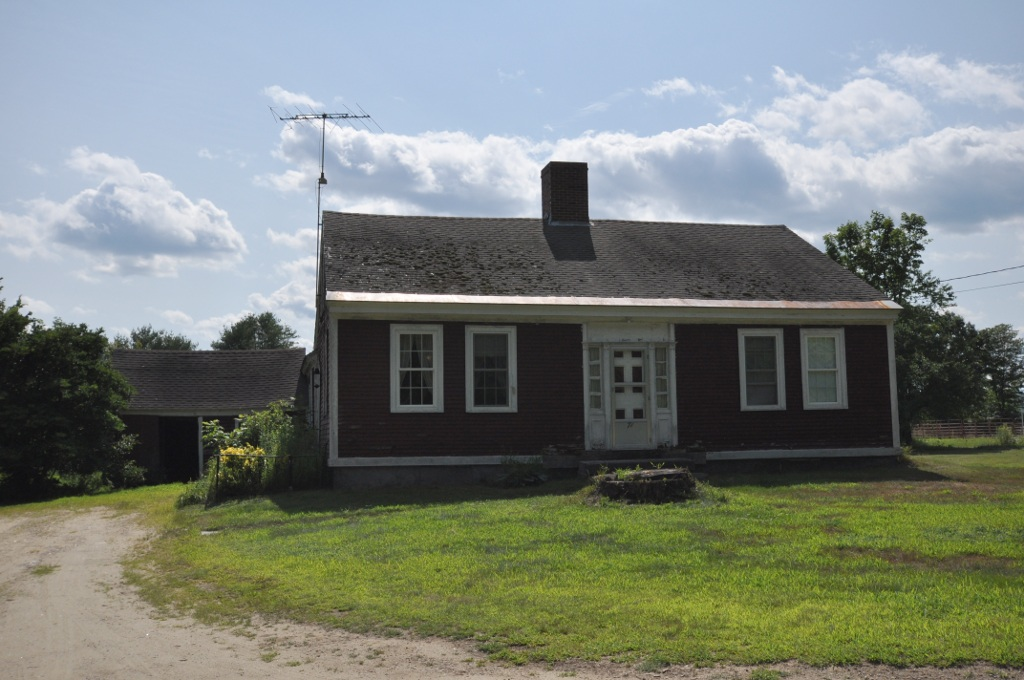

- Location within Maine Location within the United States
- Nearest city: Buckfield, Maine
- Coordinates: 44.2836°N 70.3431°W
- Area: 34 acres (14 ha)
- Built: 1800
- Architectural style: Federal
- NRHP reference No.: 93001431
- Added to NRHP: December 23, 1993

The Enoch Hall House is a historic house on Bean Road in Buckfield, Maine. Probably built in the 1790s, this house is notable as the home of one of Buckfield's early settlers, Enoch Hall, a politically active man who helped draft the Maine State Constitution in 1819. The house is also notable for the murals drawn on the walls of the second floor hallway and bedrooms probably around 1830; the artist is unknown. The house was listed on the National Register of Historic Places in 1993.

== Description and history ==
The main block of the house is a 1 1/2-story wood-frame house in a vernacular Cape form. It is set on a granite foundation, is clad in weatherboard siding, and has a central chimney. It has a fine Federal style door surround, with sidelight windows topped by a transom panel. A series of single-story additions extend from the rear of the main block.

The interior is arranged with one room on either side of the chimney, with a small vestibule in front of it, and a kitchen space behind. The rear corners are taken up by a pantry and lavatory on the west side, and a steep stair climbing to the upstairs on the east. The northwest chamber has a more elaborate fireplace surround than that to the northeast, and was probably the finest room in the house. The fireplace surrounds appear to post-date the construction of the house, because they are clearly based on patterns published by Asher Benjamin in 1806.

The upstairs has an unusual configuration for houses of this type, because the only stairwell is not located in the entry vestibule, where it is typically found. A long, narrow hallway extends along the back of the upper level, providing access to two bedrooms. The western of the two bedrooms has a barrel-vaulted plaster ceiling, and all three upstairs spaces are extensively painted with murals. The motifs of the work (leafy trees, landscape scenes, and stenciled figures) are typical of the school of work originated by Rufus Porter, but the subject matter includes elements not typically associated with Porter himself. The most unusual figures include marine mammals, two horses, and a striped cat playing with a mouse. Orison Wood, another itinerant painter, has been proposed as the artist, but was rejected on stylistic grounds.

Enoch Hall (1763–1835) moved to Buckfield from Windham in 1783 to settle this property. Local history claims that he built this house nine years later. This is supported by the general architecture of the structure, but is contradicted by the fireplace mantel designs, which may have been a later alteration. Hall represented Buckfield in the Massachusetts General Court, and was a member of the convention that drafted the Maine State Constitution in 1819, just prior to its separation from Massachusetts. He then served as a representative in the inaugural Maine State Legislature in 1820–21.

== See also ==
- National Register of Historic Places listings in Oxford County, Maine
