= E.C. and M.I. Record Homestead =

Historic house in Maine, United States

- U.S. National Register of Historic Places
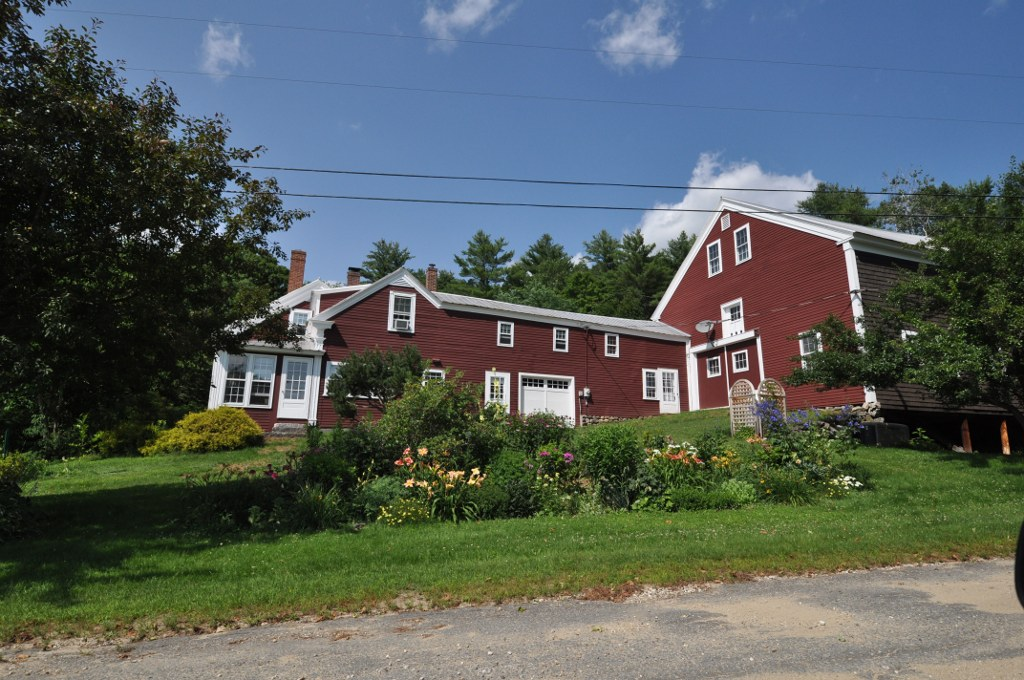

- Location within Maine Location within the United States
- Location: 8 Bean Road, Buckfield, Maine
- Built: 1843
- Architectural style: Federal/Greek Revival
- NRHP reference No.: 11000582
- Added to NRHP: August 24, 2011

The E.C. and M.I. Record Homestead is a historic house at 8 Bean Road in Buckfield, Maine. Built in 1843–44, it is a well-preserved local example of a late transitional Federal-Greek Revival house. It was listed on the National Register of Historic Places in 2011.

== Description and history ==
The Record House is a traditional New England connected homestead. Its main block is a 1 1/2-story Cape style wood-frame structure, with a pair of slender chimneys near the sides of the gabled roof. The main entrance is centered and slightly recessed, with flanking sidelights and a transom window above. A two-story kitchen ell, also with a side-gable roof, extends to the right side, and a connecting two-story ell extends to the rear from that section, joining the main house to the barn. The exterior trim notably includes elaborate Greek Revival pilasters at the corners of the main block and kitchen ell. The interior woodwork includes a combination of Federal and Greek Revival elements.

The house was built in 1843-44 by Ezekiel Courtney Record and his wife, Mariam Irish Record, on land that had been in the Record family since Buckfield's settlement. Although their property was broken up over the years, much of their original holding was reassembled in the 1970s, and the house was given a careful restoration by the current owners who bought the property in 1977.

== See also ==
- National Register of Historic Places listings in Oxford County, Maine
