= Union Church (Buckfield, Maine) =

Historic church in Maine, United States

- U.S. National Register of Historic Places
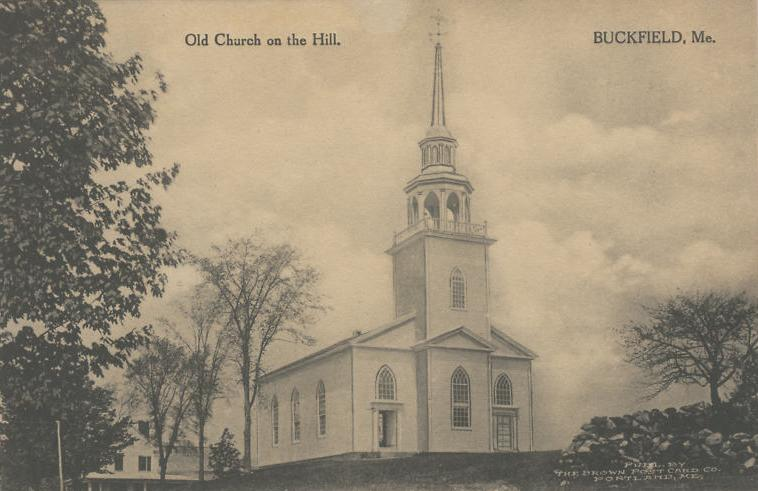

- Location within Maine Location within the United States
- Location: Off ME 140, Buckfield, Maine
- Coordinates: 44°17′40″N 70°22′13″W
- Area: 0.5 acres (0.20 ha)
- Built: 1832
- Architectural style: Gothic Revival, Federal
- NRHP reference No.: 80000245
- Added to NRHP: June 22, 1980

The Union Church is a historic church on High Street, north of the center of Buckfield, Maine. Built in 1831-32, it is a well-proportioned Federal-style church with Gothic Revival alterations. It served for a time as Buckfield's town hall, and is now managed by the Town of Buckfield. It was listed on the National Register of Historic Places in 1980.

== Description and history ==
The Union Church is located on the east side of High Street, up the hill north from the center of Buckfield. It is a single-story wood frame structure, with a gable roof, granite foundation, and two-stage tower with steeple. The main (south-facing) facade is a symmetrical three bays, with the center projecting section supporting the tower. The side bays house matching entrances, each framed by Federal style pilasters and entablature, with a Gothic-arched window directly above. The center bay has a tall Gothic-arched window, with a gabled pediment at the roofline. Above this rises the tall square first stage of the tower, also with a Gothic-arched window on the front facade. A cornice at the top of this section gives way to an octagonal belfry with arched openings, and then a steeple that begins with a reduced-scale louvered octagonal section. The sides and rear of the church each have three Gothic-arched windows.

The church was built in 1831-32, originally housing several different religious denominations. Its use declined over the course of the 19th century, and it was rescued from decay by Buckfield native John Davis Long, who donated funds to rehabilitate the structure provided the town purchased it for use as a town hall. Long also paid for the bell that now hangs in the tower. The building again fell into decline, and its care was taken over by a local nonprofit, with a major rehabilitation taking place in the late 1970s.

== See also ==
- National Register of Historic Places listings in Oxford County, Maine
