= Eepybird =

Entertainment company

EepyBird is an entertainment company best known for creating the viral video "The Extreme Diet Coke & Mentos Experiments" which won the first ever Webby Award for Viral Video in 2007 and was named "Online Game Changer of the Decade" in December 2009 by the readers of GoViral.com as "the most significant online marketing campaign of the decade."

EepyBird describes itself as a company that explores, "how everyday objects can do extraordinary things."

Their video experiments also include the viral hits "The Extreme Diet Coke and Mentos Experiments II: The Domino Effect" and "The Extreme Sticky Note Experiments" Altogether, their videos have been viewed online over 60 million times and have won numerous awards, including two Webby Awards, two Webby "People's Voice" Awards, and two Emmy nominations.

EepyBird was prominently featured in the 2009 Grammy Award-winning Weezer music video "Pork and Beans".

== Selected videography ==
=== First viral video: "The Extreme Diet Coke and Mentos Experiments" ===
In November 2005, EepyBird created their first Coke & Mentos experiment as the finale to a sketch called "In The Kitchen With Fritz" at the Oddfellow Theater in Buckfield, Maine. That performance culminated in a ten-bottle Coke & Mentos fountain.

Spurred on by the response of the live crowd, they then spent the next five months working on new effects and preparing a 101-bottle experiment modeled on the Bellagio fountains on the Las Vegas Strip. They filmed their big experiment, "The Extreme Diet Coke and Mentos Experiments: Experiment #137" on April 29, 2006 in a field in Buckfield, Maine.

==== Launch and viral spread ====
On June 3, 2006, EepyBird posted its "Extreme Diet Coke & Mentos Experiments" video on EepyBird.com. The only person they told about the site was Voltz's brother David; nonetheless, within hours, EepyBird.com began getting thousands of visitors. By the end of the first day they had over 14,000 views.

On Monday morning, June 5, 2006, a producer from the "Late Show with David Letterman" called and invited Voltz and Grobe to perform their piece on the Letterman show. Later that same week, Perfetti van Melle (the makers of Mentos) called to offer their support. On Wednesday, June 7, 2006 All Things Considered aired an interview with EepyBird.

In the first nine days after their website went live, Eepybird.com had over 2 million visitors. Within less than a year EepyBird's "Extreme Diet Coke & Mentos Experiments" video had received more than 20 million viewers online. As of December 2009 there have been over 60 million views of EepyBird videos online.

=== Second viral video: "The Extreme Diet Coke and Mentos Experiments II: The Domino Effect" ===
Perfetti Van Melle, Coca-Cola and Google sponsored EepyBird's second viral video, "The Extreme Diet Coke and Mentos Experiments II: The Domino Effect."

In this video, EepyBird's two lab-coated scientist characters (Voltz and Grobe) set off a chain reaction of over 250 Coke & Mentos geysers.

In November 2006, Google announced EepyBird's "Domino Effect" video would be the inaugural video for its Sponsored Video Program. According to National Public Radio, EepyBird's Diet Coke and Mentos work was the impetus for Google deciding to pay creators of viral video and Voltz and Grobe were the first "amateur" video creators to sign with Google to share ad revenue.

=== Third viral video: "The Extreme Sticky Note Experiments" ===
In 2008, EepyBird turned to new materials and released "The Extreme Sticky Note Experiments" in which they used over a quarter of a million sticky notes to create colorful waterfall and slinky-like effects in an office setting. That video was jointly sponsored by OfficeMax, the ABC Family television network and Coca-Cola.

EepyBird's "Extreme Sticky Note Experiments" has received approximately 13 million views on television and 4 million views online.

== Critical response ==
The cover of Advertising Age's 2007 "Agency of the Year" issue, featured a large photo of Voltz and Grobe in their trademark lab coats and goggles and the accompanying article described EepyBird's Coke & Mentos Experiments as "the most important commercial content of 2006." Media Magazine wrote that EepyBird's Diet Coke and Mentos video is "a textbook example of how a company can harness the power of viral video", and the U.K.'s Times Online website has described EepyBird's work as among the few "adverts so good people choose to watch them."

== Awards ==
"The Extreme Diet Coke & Mentos Experiments" won the Webby Awards' first award for Viral Video, and first Webby People's Voice (popular vote) Award for Viral Video and was nominated for the first Online Video Emmy Award (Variety).

"The Extreme Diet Coke & Mentos Experiments II: The Domino Effect" earned EepyBird a second Emmy Nomination, and won the Online Media Marketing and Advertising 2007 "Best in Show" award.

In 2009, "The Extreme Sticky Note Experiments" won the Webby Award for Branded Content prevailing over many larger industry players including: Nike, BMW, Burger King, Crispin, Porter + Bogusky and R/GA. By popular online vote, EepyBird's video also won the Webby "People's Voice Award" for Branded Content.

In 2007, Vh1 named EepyBird as Number 12 on its list of "Top Internet Superstars."

== Impact on sales of Coke and Mentos ==
Ten days after EepyBird released the video, the Wall Street Journal reported that Mentos had already received over $10 million worth of publicity from the video.

In the first nine months after EepyBird's first video was released, more than 10,000 copycat candy & soda videos were posted online, and Mentos estimated there had been 215 million mentions of its product in TV, print or radio stories.

EepyBird's video generated a 5-10% spike in 2 litre Diet Coke sales and a 20% spike in U.S. Mentos sales, which was the biggest sales increase in company history. Maybe more significantly, as of November 2009, Mentos sales were still 15% above what they had been prior to the launch of EepyBird's video.

In the fall of 2006, EepyBird's second viral video, "The Extreme Diet Coke & Mentos Experiments II: The Domino Effect" and video contest that EepyBird promoted for Coke along with that video, received 1.5 billion impressions.

== World records ==
EepyBird, along with Mentos, has orchestrated three world records for the most simultaneous Coke and Mentos geysers:

- 504 simultaneous geysers in Cincinnati, Ohio, May 4, 2007
- 851 simultaneous geysers in Breda, Netherlands, September 15, 2007
- 1,360 simultaneous geysers in Leuven, Belgium, April 23, 2008
- 2,433 soda fountains simultaneous geysers in Pasay, Philippines, October 18, 2010

== Key people ==
EepyBird's founders, Stephen Voltz and Fritz Grobe, met in 2000 while studying clowning at the Celebration Barn Theater in South Paris, Maine.

Fritz Grobe, the shorter of the two, left studies of mathematics at Yale University to become a juggler, going on to win five gold medals at the International Jugglers Association Championships. From 2004 to 2007, he toured with the Cirque du Soleil spin-off "Birdhouse Factory" as a lead character and featured solo clown.

Stephen Voltz, the taller of the two, has an A.B. from Oberlin College (1979) and a law degree from the New York University School of Law (1984). In 2000, he produced and starred in his own one-man physical comedy show "The Benefit of Doubt" at the San Francisco Fringe Festival.

As of 2010, both Voltz and Grobe serve on the Board of Directors of the Celebration Barn Theater.
