= Zadoc Long Free Library =

- U.S. National Register of Historic Places
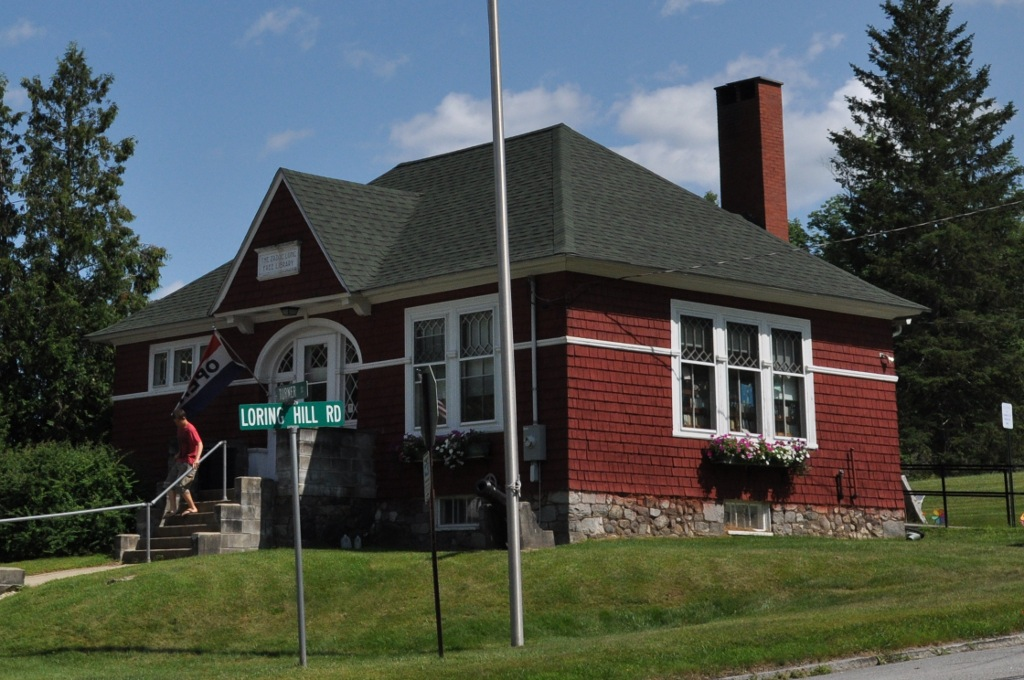

- Location within Maine Location within the United States
- Location: ME 117 S side, at jct. with ME 140, Buckfield, Maine
- Coordinates: 44°17′22″N 70°21′55″W
- Area: less than one acre
- Built: 1901
- Architect: John Calvin Stevens
- Architectural style: Colonial Revival, Shingle Style
- MPS: Maine Public Libraries MPS
- NRHP reference No.: 94000636
- Added to NRHP: June 24, 1994

The Zadoc Long Free Library is the public library of Buckfield, Maine, United States. It is located at 5 Turner Street in a small wood-frame building designed by John Calvin Stevens and built in 1901. It was a gift to the town from Buckfield native John Davis Long in honor of his father Zadoc, and was the town's first library. The library was listed on the National Register of Historic Places in 1994.

== Description and history ==
The library is a single-storey wood-frame structure, with a hip roof, walls sheathed in wood shingles, and a granite foundation. A slightly projecting gable hangs over the entrance, which is centered on the three-bay main facade. The doorway is flanked by sidelight windows with diamond panes, echoing a feature in the elliptical hood, which surmounts the door. The gable is supported by a pair of console brackets. To the left of the entry are paired sash windows with multi-pane upper and two-pane lower; to the right there are three such windows. The interior of the library is divided into three spaces: the center has the circulation desk, the right side has a reading area, and the left side has the stacks. The stacks consist of original wooden shelving with Craftsman style pedestals at the ends. The reading room has a large brick fireplace.

John Davis Long (1838–1915), a Buckfield native, served as Governor of Massachusetts in the 1880s and as United States Secretary of the Navy under President William McKinley. In 1900, he acted on an idea he had harbored for some time to provide his place of birth with a library, hiring the noted Portland architect John Calvin Stevens to design the building. The property on which it stands was donated to the town, and the building was completed in 1901. Long and his relatives provided an initial collection of books. The library is one of a series designed by Stevens for a number of small Maine communities around the turn of the 20th century; the design of the Long library was influential in his work on the Rumford Public Library, and the Cary Library in Houlton, both designed in 1903.

== See also ==
- National Register of Historic Places listings in Oxford County, Maine
