= James C. Freeman =

American politician

James Crawford Freeman
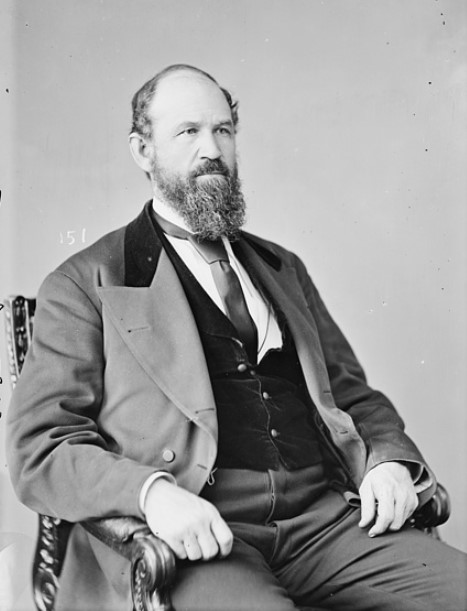

Member of the U.S. House of Representatives from Georgia's 5th district
- In office March 4, 1873 – March 3, 1875
- Preceded by: Dudley M. DuBose
- Succeeded by: Milton A. Candler

Personal details
- Born: April 1, 1820 Clinton, Georgia, U.S.
- Died: September 3, 1885 (aged 66) Atlanta, Georgia, U.S.
- Party: Republican
- Occupation: Banker, jeweler, politician, soldier

Military service
- Allegiance: Confederate States of America
- Branch/service: Confederate States Army
- Years of service: 1862–1865 (CSA)
- Rank: private, Company B, 42nd Georgia Infantry
- Battles/wars: American Civil War

James Crawford Freeman (April 1, 1820 – September 3, 1885) was a Georgia planter and slaveowner who after serving in the Confederate States Army during the American Civil War received a pardon and became a banker, jeweler and politician who served one term in the U.S. Representative as a Republican.

== Early and family life ==
Born in Clinton, Jones County, Georgia, Freeman was the second son born to planter James Freeman and his first wife, the former Rebecca Rhymes. His younger brother Major John Rhymes Freeman would later move to Rome, Georgia, and become a major slaveowner then a Confederate officer, although this James Freeman never received a commission. Educated in private schools, the younger James Freeman married Amanda Malvania Neal on May 9, 1843, in Pike County, Georgia. They had at least three sons—David Neal Freeman (1847-1911), Edmund Freeman (b.1849) and James Crawford Freeman Jr. (1860-1905), and daughters Mary Freeman (b.1851) and Frances Freeman Iverson (1863-1930).

== Career ==
As an adult, Freeman farmed using slave labor. In 1850, he and/or his father owned 82 slaves in Jones County, Georgia and 10 slaves in adjoining Pike County. By 1860 this James C. Freeman lived near Flat Shoals in Meriwether County, Georgia (adjacent to Pike County) and owned 16 slaves (8 of them noted as fugitives) as well as rented rooms to a local grocer and two clerks.

His brother, the future Confederate Maj. John Rhymes Freeman, owned 60 slaves in Rome, Floyd County, Georgia by 1860. J.R. Freeman volunteered to fight for the Confederacy, and received a commission as a lieutenant in the Floyd legion, a Georgia militia company in October 1861, and was promoted to at least Lt.Col.

In May 1862 this Freeman either volunteered or was conscripted into Company B of the 42nd Georgia Infantry, known as the Echols Guards, a Confederate unit formed in Meriwether County. He was mustered out on March 19, 1865, in Salisbury, North Carolina. President Andrew Johnson pardoned Freeman in 1865. After the Confederacy's defeat and loss of his slaves, this James C. Freeman moved to Griffin, the county seat of Spalding County, Georgia adjacent to Meriwether County (and similarly near Atlanta) and resumed his business activities. Relatives may have lived there. A slaveowning, 36 year old Methodist preacher named James D. Freeman and his wife, and another slaveowner named Adeline Freeman had been living in Spalding County in 1860, before the war began. This James Freeman also had business investments and was a banker.

In 1872, Georgia voters from the 5th Congressional district elected Freeman as a Republican to the Forty-third Congress (March 4, 1873 – March 3, 1875). He succeeded former Confederate officer Dudley M. DuBose, a protege of fiery former U.S. Senator and unreconstructed Confederate general Robert Toombs, but who likewise only served a single term. As a congressman, Freeman appointed Henry Ossian Flipper to the U.S. Military Academy at West Point, who became the first black person to graduate from that institution. After Freeman lost his bid for re-election to Democrat Milton A. Candler, he moved to nearby Atlanta with his wife and youngest son and daughter. Freeman identified himself as a jeweler during the 1880 U.S. federal census.

== Death and legacy ==
Freeman survived his wife by less than two years, dying in Atlanta on September 3, 1885.

U.S. House of Representatives
Preceded by Dudley M. DuBose	Member of the U.S. House of Representatives from Georgia's 5th congressional district March 4, 1873 – March 3, 1875	Succeeded by Milton A. Candler
