= Noah Prince =

American politician (1797–1872)

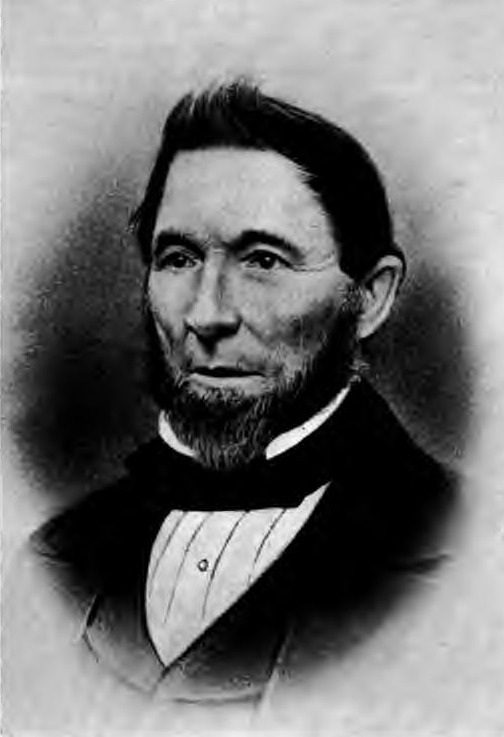

30th President of the Maine Senate
- In office May 14, 1851 – January 5, 1853
- Preceded by: Paulinus Foster
- Succeeded by: Samuel Butman

Member of the Maine Senate from the 14th district
- In office May 8, 1850 – January 5, 1853
- Constituency: Oxford County

Member of the Maine House of Representatives from Buckfield
- In office January 1, 1840 – January 3, 1844
- Preceded by: Daniel Chase

Personal details
- Born: April 13, 1797 Buckfield, District of Maine, Massachusetts, U.S.
- Died: February 14, 1872 (aged 74) Buckfield, Maine, U.S.
- Party: Democratic (until 1854); Republican (1854‍–‍1872)
- Spouse: Sarah Farrar (m. 1825)
- Children: 6, including Charles
- Relatives: Job Prince (brother)
- Occupation: Farmer; businessman; politician; judge

Noah Prince (April 13, 1797 – February 14, 1872) was a Maine judge and politician who served as president of the Maine Senate from 1851 to 1852.

Prince was born in Buckfield, Massachusetts, which later became part of Maine. He married Sarah Farrar, and their children included Charles H. Prince, who was later elected to the United States Congress.
