= 15th Georgia Infantry Regiment =

Infantry regiment of the Confederate States Army

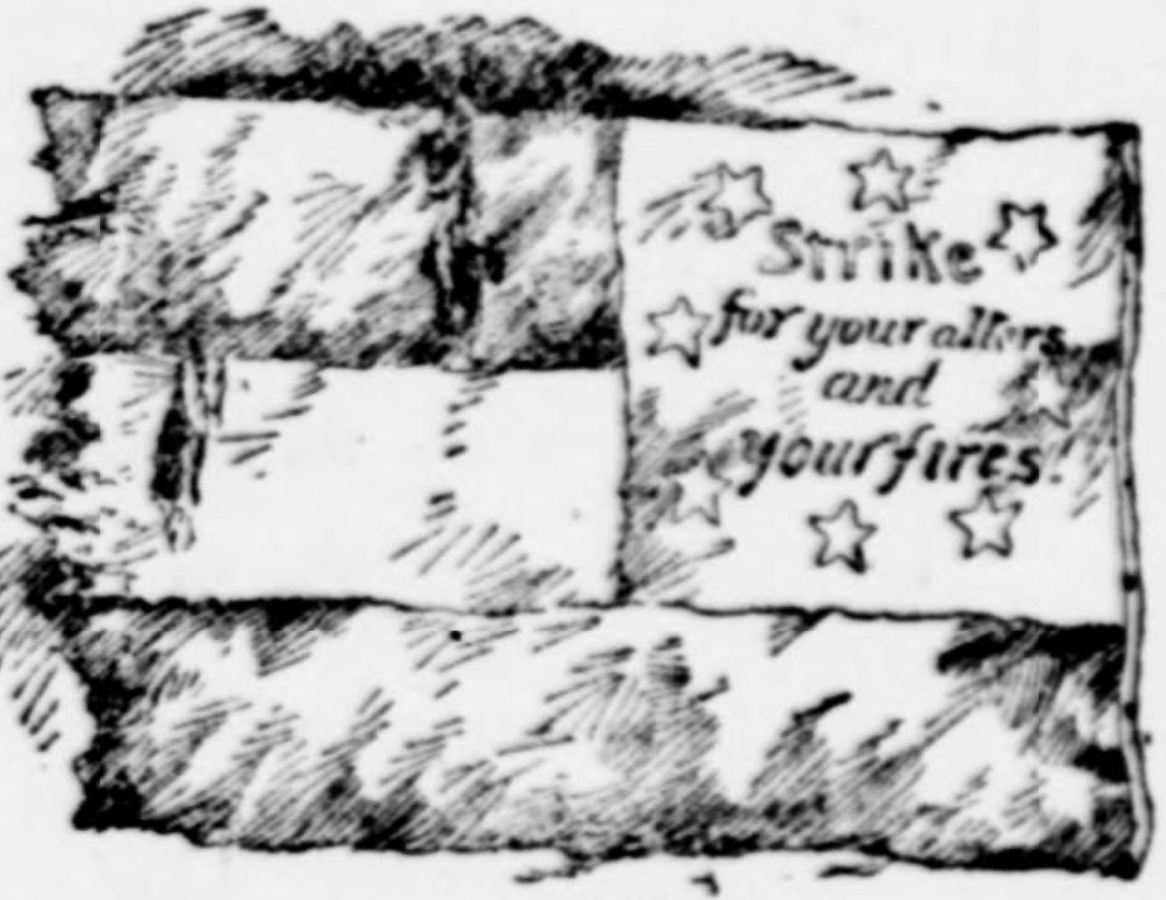
- National flag of the regiment
- Active: July 15, 1861–April 1865
- Country: Confederate States of America
- Allegiance: Georgia
- Branch: Confederate States Army
- Type: Infantry
- Engagements: American Civil War: Battle of Yorktown; Seven Days Battles; Battle of Garnett's & Golding's Farm; Battle of Malvern Hill; Battle of Thoroughfare Gap; Second Battle of Bull Run; Battle of Antietam; Battle of Fredericksburg; Suffolk Campaign; Battle of Gettysburg; Battle of Chickamauga; Chattanooga campaign; Knoxville Campaign; Battle of the Wilderness; Battle of Spotsylvania Courthouse; Battle of North Anna; Battle of Cold Harbor; Siege of Petersburg; Battle of Chaffin's Farm; Battle of Fair Oaks & Darbytown Road; Battle of Appomattox Courthouse

Commanders
- Notable commanders: Dudley M. DuBose

The 15th Georgia Infantry Regiment was an infantry regiment in the Confederate States Army during the American Civil War. It participated in most of the key battles of Robert E. Lee's Army of Northern Virginia.

== Service ==
The 15th Georgia was organized in the spring of 1861 in Athens, Georgia. It contained troops from eight counties in Northeastern Georgia: Hancock, Stephens, Elbert, Lamar, Warren, Wilkes, Taliaferro, and Oglethorpe counties. It was initially attached to General Robert Toombs' Brigade in David Jones' Division of the Army of Northern Virginia. Under Toombs, the 15th Georgia fought in the Seven Days Battles, the Battle of Thoroughfare Gap, the Second Battle of Manassas, and the Battle of Antietam. After this point, the brigade was under the command of Colonel (later General) Henry Benning. The 15th Georgia served with the Army of Northern Virginia for the remainder of the war, except when it detached with General Longstreet during the Tidewater Campaign, the Battle of Chickamauga, and the Knoxville Campaign of 1863. The 15th Georgia was present at the Battle of Appomattox Courthouse and the subsequent surrender. Twenty officers and 226 men of the 15th Georgia Infantry were present at the surrender.

== Organization ==
=== Staff ===
- Colonel
  - Thomas W. Thomas (July 15, 1861 to March 26, 1862; Resigned due to disability)
  - William M. McIntosh (March 29, 1862 to June 27, 1862; Killed at Garnett's Farm, Virginia)
  - William T. Millican (July 22, 1862 to September 17, 1862; Killed at Sharpsburg)
  - Dudley M. DuBose (January 1, 1863 to November 16, 1864; Promoted to Brigadier General)
- Lieutenant Colonel
  - Linton Stevens (July 15, 1861 to December 19, 1861; Resigned)
  - William M. McIntosh (December 21, 1861 to March 29, 1862)
  - William T. Millican (May 1, 1862 to July 22, 1862)
  - Theophilus J. Smith (October 30, 1862 to January 14, 1863; Resigned due to disability)
  - Stephen Z. Hearnsberger (March 4, 1863 to July 3, 1863; Captured at Gettysburg)
- Major
  - William M. McIntosh (July 15, 1861 to December 21, 1861)
  - Joseph T. Smith (December 23, 1861 to March 5, 62; Resigned)
  - Theophilus J. Smith (May 1, 1862 to July 25, 1862: Resigned then promoted)
  - P.J. Shannon (August 1, 1862 to April 9, 1865; Surrendered at Appomattox)

=== Companies ===
- Company A - Delhi Rangers (Wilkes County)
- Company B - Tugalo Blues (Franklin County)
- Company C - Fireside Guards (Elbert County)
- Company D - Stephens Home Guards (Taliaferro County)
- Company E - Hancock Volunteers (Hancock County)
- Company F - Bowman Volunteers (Elbert County)
- Company G - Lamar Confederates (Lincoln County)
- Company H - Pool Volunteers (Hart County)
- Company I - McIntosh Volunteers (Elbert County)
- Company K - Hancock Confederate Guards (Hancock County)

== See also ==
- Georgia in the American Civil War
- List of Georgia Confederate Civil War regiments
