= Job Prince =

American politician

Member of the Executive Council of Maine
- In office 1860
- Governor: Lot M. Morrill

16th President of the Maine Senate
- In office January 2, 1839 – January 1, 1840
- Preceded by: Nathaniel Littlefield
- Succeeded by: Stephen C. Foster

Member of the Maine Senate
- In office January 31, 1854 – January 3, 1855 Serving with Hiram Hubbard
- Preceded by: John J. Holman
- Constituency: 13th district (Oxford County)
- In office January 3, 1838 – January 1, 1840 Serving with Edward L. Osgood
- Preceded by: Isaac Strickland
- Succeeded by: David Hammons
- Constituency: 11th district (Oxford County)

Member of the Maine House of Representatives from Turner
- In office January 1, 1834 – January 7, 1835
- Preceded by: Daniel Hutchinson
- Succeeded by: Ajalon Dillingham

Personal details
- Born: March 17, 1795 Buckfield, District of Maine, Massachusetts, U.S.
- Died: April 30, 1875 (aged 80) Turner, Maine, U.S.
- Party: Democratic
- Spouses: Zilpha Spaulding (m. 1821; died 1844); Olive Leavitt (m. 1844)
- Relatives: Noah Prince (brother)
- Occupation: Farmer; politician

Military service
- Battles/wars: War of 1812

Job Prince (March 17, 1795 - April 30, 1875) was an American politician from Maine. Originally from Buckfield, Massachusetts (which became part of Maine in 1820) Prince served four terms in the Maine Legislature representing Turner, Maine. Each term was elected annually. In 1834, he spent his first and only term in the Maine House of Representatives. Four years later in 1838, Prince was elected to the Maine Senate. Re-elected a year later, Prince was elected Senate President. Prince won his seat again in 1854. In 1860, he joined the Governor's Council.

He served in many local offices in Androscoggin County, including County Commissioner, Judge of Probate and Tax Assessor. A farmer, Prince served as President of the Oxford County Agricultural Society as well.
