= Thompson's Bridge =

- U.S. National Register of Historic Places
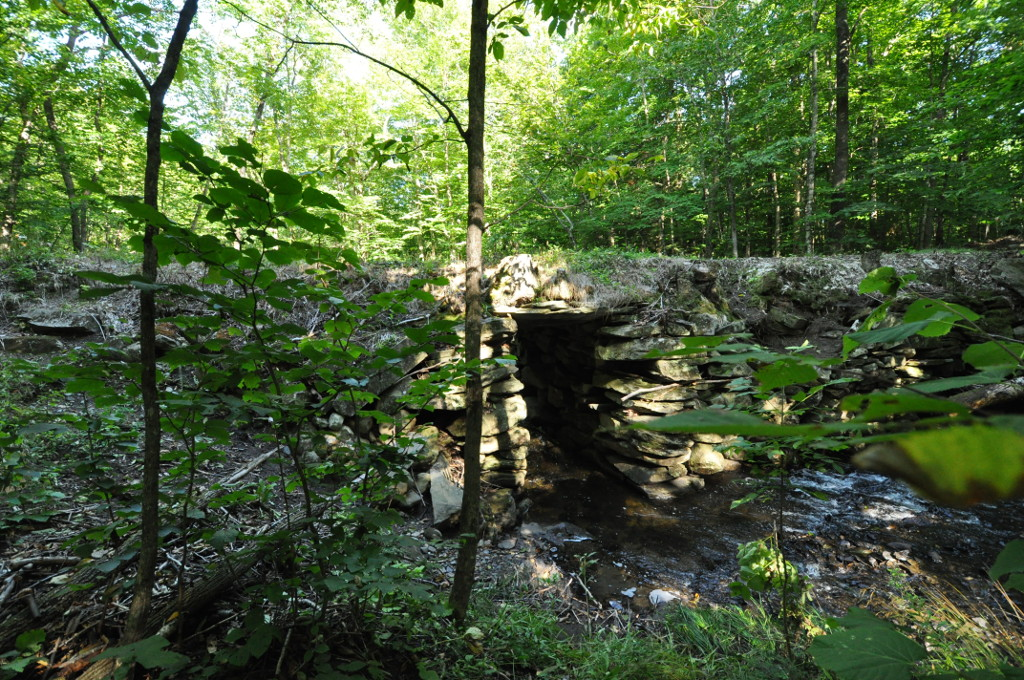

- Location within Maine Location within the United States
- Nearest city: Allen's Mills, Maine
- Coordinates: 44°43′36″N 70°0′25″W
- Area: less than one acre
- Built: 1808
- NRHP reference No.: 91000321
- Added to NRHP: March 22, 1991

Thompson's Bridge is a historic stone bridge in rural Franklin County, Maine. Built c. 1808, it is one of a very small number of surviving stone lintel bridges in the state, a type that were once quite common. It carries a local dirt road across Josiah Creek in the Allen's Mills section of Industry, and is located near (and possibly on) the border with neighboring Somerset County. The bridge was listed on the National Register of Historic Places in 1991.

The bridge abutments consist of local fieldstone arranged in dry laid courses. The main span consists of large granite slabs laid across the narrow opening between the abutments. A layer of earth is built above these slabs, supporting the dirt roadway, which is about 10 feet (3.0 m) wide. The southern abutment has extensive wingwalls, giving that structure a total width of about 20 feet (6.1 m).

The road which the bridge carries was probably laid out in 1808, during the early period of Industry's settlement. John Thompson had a house and established a grist mill nearby in 1805. The area had been abandoned by the late 19th century, and the roadway south of the bridge is unmaintained and in deteriorated condition. In a 1924 survey, the state identified more than 100 of this type of bridge; as of 1987, only three were known to survive in relatively unaltered condition. The bridge is also one of the town of Industry's oldest structures; its oldest surviving building has an estimated construction date of 1820.

== See also ==
- Churchill Bridge, another stone lintel bridge in Buckfield, Maine
- National Register of Historic Places listings in Franklin County, Maine
- List of bridges on the National Register of Historic Places in Maine
