= Ezekiel S. Candler Jr. =

American politician (1862–1944)

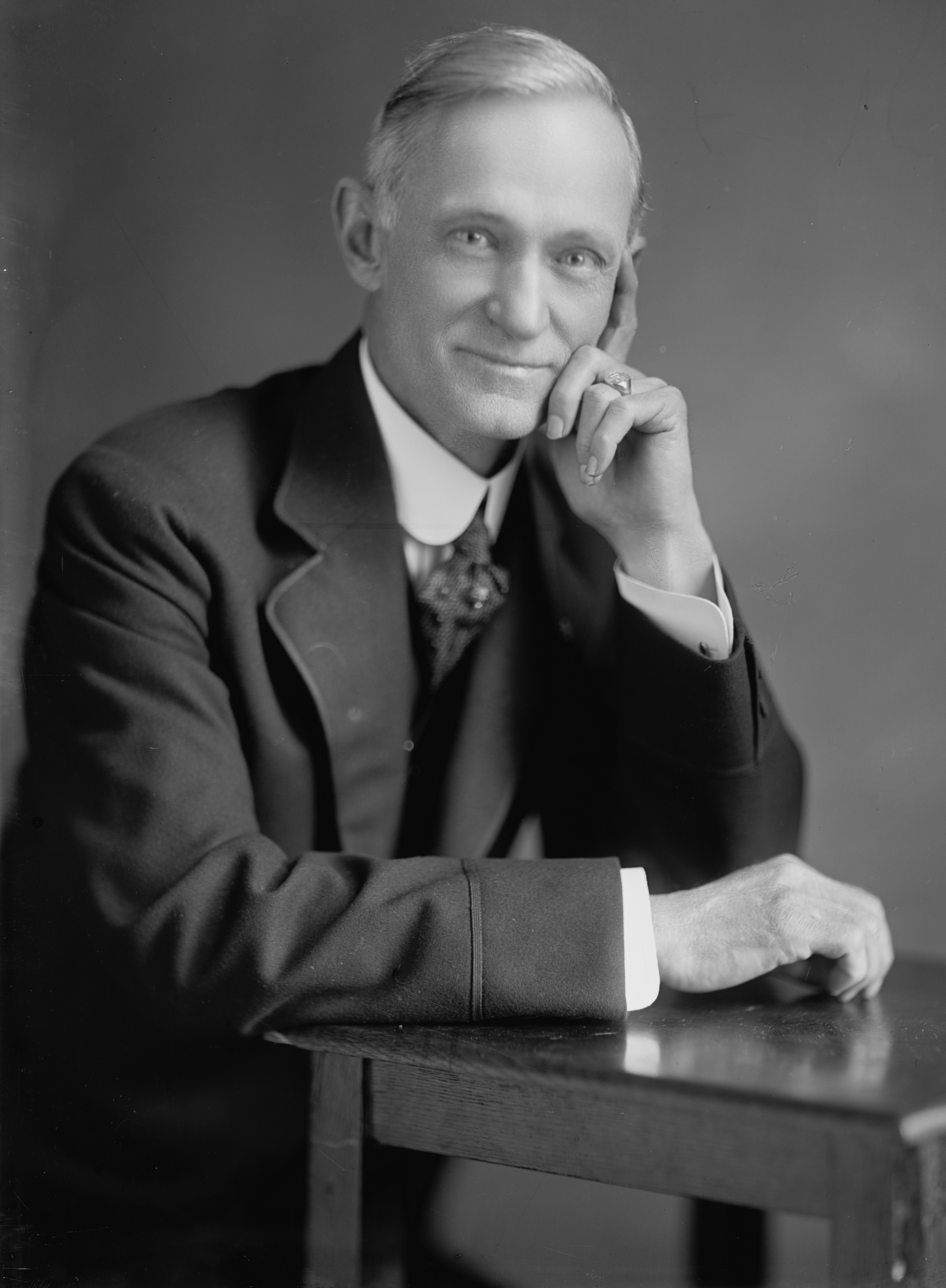

Mayor of Corinth, Mississippi
- In office 1933–1937

Member of the U.S. House of Representatives from Mississippi's 1st district
- In office March 4, 1901 – March 3, 1921
- Preceded by: John Mills Allen
- Succeeded by: John E. Rankin

Personal details
- Born: Ezekiel Samuel Candler Jr. January 18, 1862 Belleville, Hamilton County, Florida, Confederate States of America
- Died: December 18, 1944 (aged 82) Corinth, Mississippi, U.S.
- Resting place: Henry Cemetery, Corinth, Mississippi, U.S.
- Party: Democratic
- Spouses: Nancy Priscilla Hazlewood (m. 1883) Effie Merrill Neuhardt (m. 1924) Ottie Hardenstein (m. 1933)
- Relations: Milton A. Candler (uncle); Allen D. Candler (cousin)
- Children: 3
- Parent(s): Ezekiel Samuel Candler Sr. Julia Beville
- Education: Iuka Male Academy; University of Mississippi
- Profession: Politician, lawyer

Ezekiel Samuel Candler Jr. (January 18, 1862 – December 18, 1944) was an American politician and lawyer who served in the United States House of Representatives, representing the 1st congressional district of Mississippi for two decades as a Democrat. He subsequently served as the mayor of Corinth, Mississippi from 1933 to 1937.

Candler was the nephew of Milton A. Candler, a Confederate lawyer and politician from Georgia. He was also the cousin of Allen D. Candler, a United States representative who served as both the 14th secretary of state of Georgia and the 56th governor of Georgia.

== Early life and education ==
Candler was born in Belleville, Hamilton County, Florida on January 18, 1862. He was the first of five children born to Ezekiel Samuel Candler Sr. and Julia Beville. In 1870, Candler and his family moved to Tishomingo County, Mississippi.

Candler attended common schools in Mississippi, including Iuka Male Academy. He graduated from the law department at the University of Mississippi in 1881. He was admitted to the bar the same year, after which he commenced practice in Iuka.

== Career ==
Candler served as chairman of the Democratic executive committee of Tishomingo County in 1884. Candler also served as chairman of the Democratic executive committee of Alcorn County for several years. In 1887, Candler moved to Corinth, where he continued practicing law.

Candler served in the United States House of Representatives from 1901 to 1921, representing the 1st congressional district of Mississippi as a Democrat. Candler served from the 57th United States Congress to the 66th United States Congress.

While in the 62nd United States Congress, Candler served as chairman of the Committee on Alcoholic Liquor Traffic.

Candler was an unsuccessful candidate for renomination in 1920, losing the Democratic primary to John E. Rankin. Candler's time in office concluded on March 3, 1921, almost 20 years after it began.

Following his tenure in Congress, Candler resumed practicing law. He served as the mayor of Corinth from 1933 to 1937.

== Personal life and death ==
Candler was related to both Milton A. Candler and Allen D. Candler. Milton, Candler's uncle, was a Confederate lawyer and politician from Georgia. Allen, Candler's cousin, was a United States representative who served as both the 14th secretary of state of Georgia and the 56th governor of Georgia.

Candler married Nannie Priscilla Hazlewood in Mississippi on April 26, 1883. Candler and Hazlewood had three children together. On January 14, 1924, Candler married Effie Merrill Neuhardt. On June 21, 1933, he married Ottie Hardenstein in Madison, Alabama.

Candler was a Baptist. He was a member of the Freemasons, the Odd Fellows, The Elks, the Knights of Pythias, and the Knights of Honor.

Candler died in Corinth at the age of 82 on December 8, 1944. He was interred at Henry Cemetery, located in Corinth.

== See also ==
- Milton A. Candler, Candler's uncle, a Confederate lawyer and politician from Georgia
- Allen D. Candler, Candler's cousin, a United States representative who served as both the 14th secretary of state of Georgia and the 56th governor of Georgia

U.S. House of Representatives
Preceded by John Mills Allen	Member of the U.S. House of Representatives from Mississippi's 1st congressional district 1901–1921	Succeeded by John E. Rankin
Political offices
Preceded by —	Mayor of Corinth, Mississippi; 1933–1937	Succeeded by —
