= Campbellton, Georgia =

Unincorporated town in Georgia, U.S.

Coordinates: 33°39′01″N 84°40′10″W

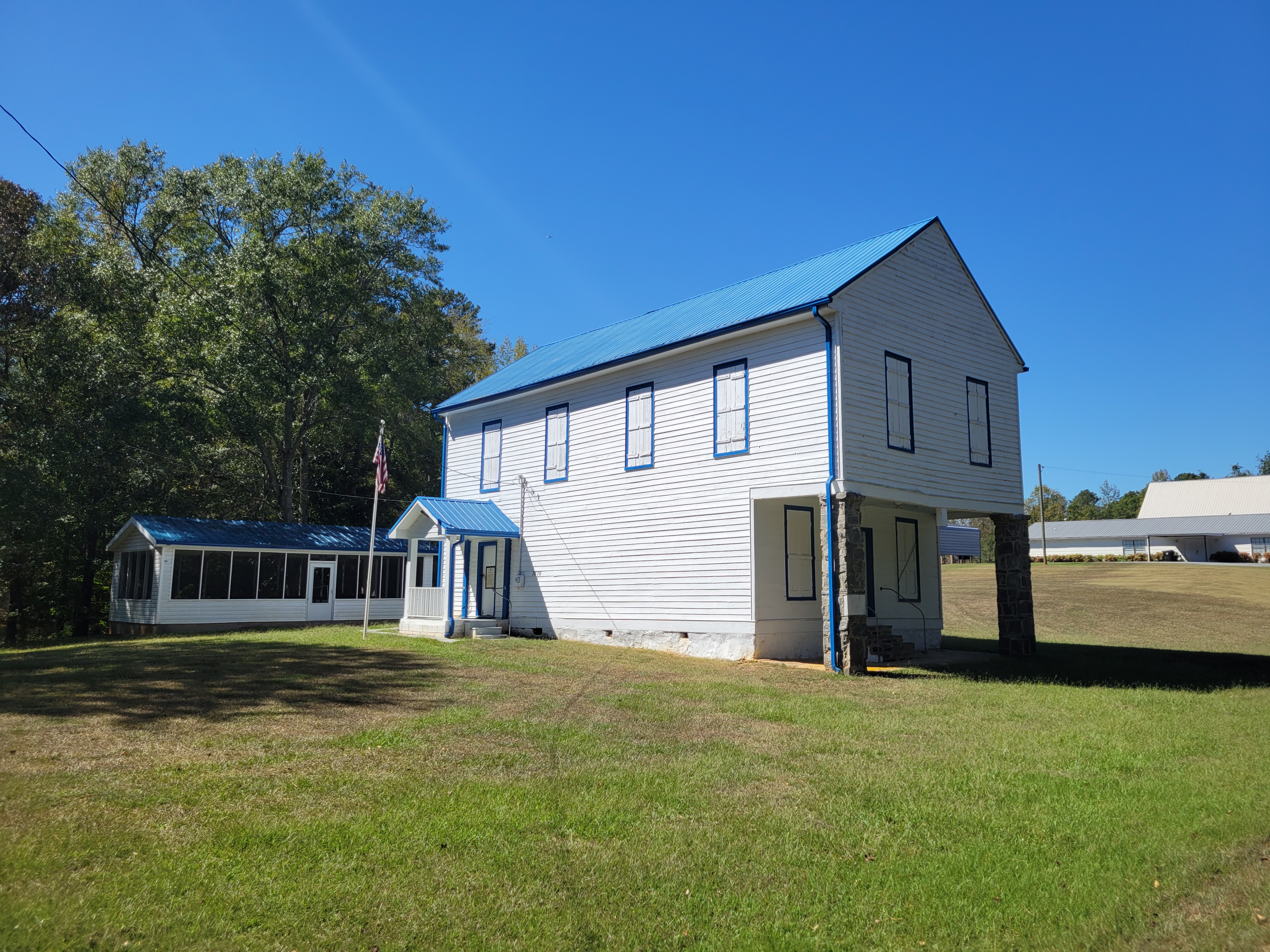
Campbellton Lodge #76

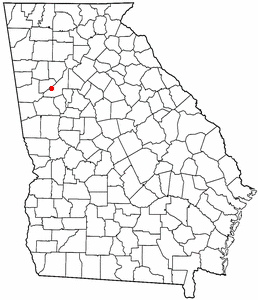
Location of Campbellton, Georgia

Campbellton is an unincorporated town in southwestern Fulton County, Georgia, United States. It was the original county seat for Campbell County, Georgia from 1828 until 1870, when the county seat was then moved to Fairburn, Georgia. The Atlanta & West Point Railroad line had been laid through nearby Fairburn in 1854. Business activity shifted to Fairburn which grew, and Campbellton's population dwindled. Campbell County then became part of Fulton in 1932. (ref. Old Campbell County Historical Society files, Palmetto, Georgia ref.)
