= 23rd Maine Infantry Regiment =

- Active: September 29, 1862, to July 15, 1863
- Country: United States
- Allegiance: Union
- Branch: Infantry

The 23rd Maine Infantry Regiment was an infantry regiment that served in the Union Army during the American Civil War.

== Service ==
The 23rd Maine Infantry was organized in Portland, Maine and mustered on September 29, 1862, for nine months' service.

The regiment left Maine for Washington, D.C., October 18. Attached to Grover's Brigade, Defenses of Washington, to February 1863. Jewett's Brigade, XXII Corps, to June 1863. Slough's Brigade, Defenses of Alexandria, XXII Corps, to July 1863. Camp at East Capitol Hill until October 25, 1862. Moved to Seneca, Maryland, October 25, and performed guard duty along the Potomac River until April 19, 1863. Stationed at Edwards Ferry December 1862 to April 1863. Moved to Poolesville April 19, then to Washington May 5, and to Alexandria May 24. Moved to Poolesville, Maryland, June 17, then to Harpers Ferry, West Virginia.

The 23rd Maine Infantry mustered out of service July 15, 1863.

== Casualties ==
The regiment lost a total of 56 enlisted men during service, all due to disease.

== See also ==
- List of Maine Civil War units
- Maine in the American Civil War
