= Buckfield, Maine =

Town in Maine, United States

- Town
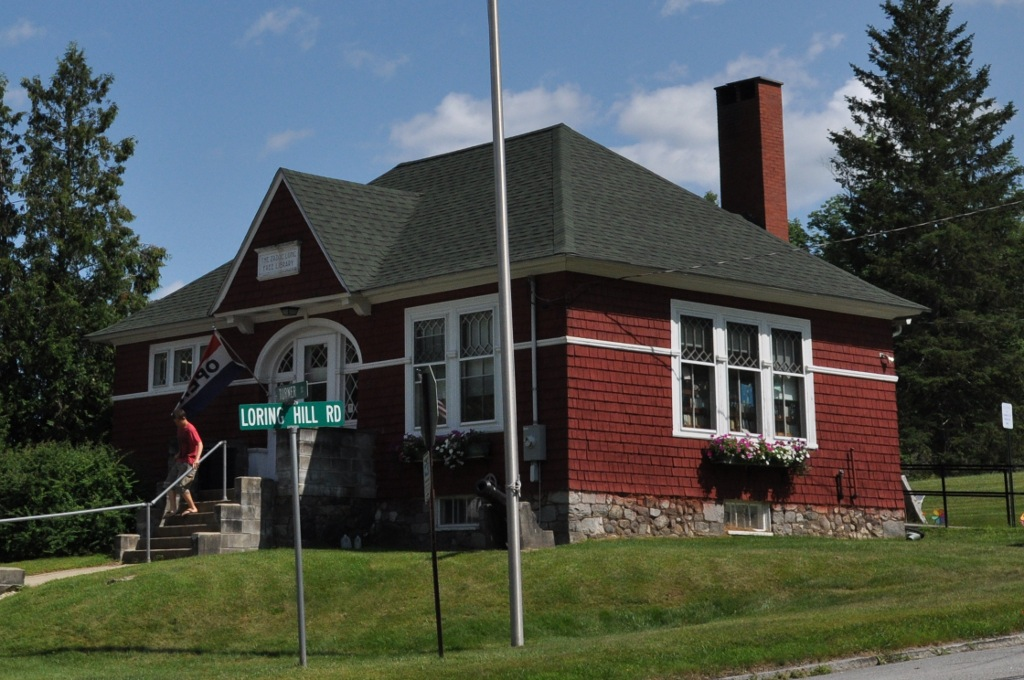
- The Zadoc Long Free Library

- Seal
- Motto: "Where good people live"
- Location within Maine Location within the United States
- Coordinates: 44°16′53″N 70°23′20″W
- Country: United States
- State: Maine
- County: Oxford
- Incorporated: 1793

Area
  - Total: 37.77 sq mi (97.82 km^{2})
  - Land: 37.53 sq mi (97.20 km^{2})
  - Water: 0.24 sq mi (0.62 km^{2})
- Elevation: 364 ft (111 m)

Population (2020)
  - Total: 1,983
  - Density: 53/sq mi (20.4/km^{2})
- Time zone: UTC-5 (Eastern (EST))
  - Summer (DST): UTC-4 (EDT)
- ZIP code: 04220
- Area code: 207
- FIPS code: 23-08710
- GNIS feature ID: 582376
- Website: www.buckfield.maine.gov

Buckfield is a town in Oxford County, Maine, United States. Buckfield is included in the Lewiston-Auburn, Maine metropolitan New England City and Town Area. It is a member of Regional School Unit 10 along with nearby Hartford and Sumner. The town had a population of 1,983 as of the 2020 census.

== History ==
It was first settled in 1776 by Benjamin Spaulding from Chelmsford, Massachusetts, a fur trapper. Abijah Buck and Thomas Allen settled in the area in spring of 1777 with their families. In 1785, the inhabitants procured a survey of the town and purchased it from Massachusetts for 2 shillings per acre. Originally called Bucktown Plantation (or Plantation No. 5), in 1793 the Massachusetts General Court incorporated it as Buckfield, named for Abijah Buck.

The surface of the town is uneven, but has deep, dark soil that yielded good crops of grain, corn and apples. The east and west branches of the Nezinscot River join at Buckfield Village, supplying water power for mills. Products included lumber, roof shingles, barrel staves, box boards, shovel handles, snow-shovels, handsleds, drag-rakes, brushes, brush blocks, powder-kegs, leather harness, cutting-blocks and men's boots. In 1870, the population of the town was 1,494. The Rumford Falls and Buckfield Railroad passed through the town. Its depot was at Buckfield Village, the business center for the area.

== Geography ==
According to the United States Census Bureau, the town has a total area of 37.77 square miles (97.82 km^{2}), of which 37.53 square miles (97.20 km^{2}) is land and 0.24 square miles (0.62 km^{2}) is water. Buckfield is drained by the Nezinscot River, a tributary of the Androscoggin River.

The town is served by state routes 117 and 140. It borders the towns of Sumner and Hartford to the north, Turner to the east, Hebron to the south, and Paris to the west and West Paris to the northwest.

== Demographics ==
Historical population
Census	Pop.	Note	%±
1800	1,002		—
1810	1,251		24.9%
1820	1,501		20.0%
1830	1,514		0.9%
1840	1,629		7.6%
1850	1,657		1.7%
1860	1,705		2.9%
1870	1,494		−12.4%
1880	1,379		−7.7%
1890	1,200		−13.0%
1900	1,139		−5.1%
1910	1,087		−4.6%
1920	957		−12.0%
1930	972		1.6%
1940	903		−7.1%
1950	899		−0.4%
1960	982		9.2%
1970	929		−5.4%
1980	1,333		43.5%
1990	1,566		17.5%
2000	1,723		10.0%
2010	2,009		16.6%
2020	1,983		−1.3%
U.S. Decennial Census

=== 2010 census ===
As of the census of 2010, there were 2,009 people, 821 households, and 547 families living in the town. The population density was 53.5 inhabitants per square mile (20.7/km^{2}). There were 890 housing units at an average density of 23.7 per square mile (9.2/km^{2}). The racial makeup of the town was 97.7% White, 0.2% African American, 0.3% Native American, 0.4% Asian, 0.1% from other races, and 1.3% from two or more races. Hispanic or Latino of any race were 0.5% of the population.

There were 821 households, of which 29.6% had children under the age of 18 living with them, 51.0% were married couples living together, 10.0% had a female householder with no husband present, 5.6% had a male householder with no wife present, and 33.4% were non-families. 25.0% of all households were made up of individuals, and 8.2% had someone living alone who was 65 years of age or older. The average household size was 2.45 and the average family size was 2.88.

The median age in the town was 41.2 years. 23.2% of residents were under the age of 18; 7% were between the ages of 18 and 24; 25.1% were from 25 to 44; 32.9% were from 45 to 64; and 11.9% were 65 years of age or older. The gender makeup of the town was 51.0% male and 49.0% female.

=== 2000 census ===
As of the census of 2000, there were 1,723 people, 668 households, and 476 families living in the town. The population density was 45.7 inhabitants per square mile (17.6/km^{2}). There were 715 housing units at an average density of 19.0 per square mile (7.3/km^{2}). The racial makeup of the town was 100% [98.49% White, 0.17% Native American, 0.35% Asian, 0.12% from other races, and 0.87% from two or more races. Hispanic or Latino of any race were 0.41% of the population.

There were 668 households, out of which 35.3% had children under the age of 18 living with them, 58.5% were married couples living together, 9.0% had a female householder with no husband present, and 28.7% were non-families. 20.2% of all households were made up of individuals, and 6.7% had someone living alone who was 65 years of age or older. The average household size was 2.58 and the average family size was 2.99.

In the town, the population was spread out, with 26.8% under the age of 18, 7.5% from 18 to 24, 30.9% from 25 to 44, 25.0% from 45 to 64, and 9.9% who were 65 years of age or older. The median age was 37 years. For every 100 females there were 96.5 males.

The median income for a household in the town was $36,821, and the median income for a family was $40,078. Males had a median income of $28,472 versus $22,262 for females. The per capita income for the town was $17,503. About 5.6% of families and 8.3% of the population were below the poverty line, including 9.5% of those under age 18 and 9.9% of those age 65 or over.

Voter registration

Voter Registration and Party Enrollment as of June 2014
Party	Total Voters	Percentage
Unenrolled	749	54.4%
Republican	348	25.3%
Democratic	266	19.3%
Green Independent	15	1.1%
Total	1,378	100%

== Landmarks ==
- Churchill Bridge – built c. 1797
- E.C. and M.I. Record Homestead – built 1843–1844
- Enoch Hall House – built c. 1790
- Union Church – built in 1832
- Zadoc Long Free Library – built in 1901

== Schools ==
- Buckfield Junior-Senior High School

== Notable people ==
- Hermon Carey Bumpus, fifth president of Tufts College
- John Lewis Childs, horticulturist, N.Y. state senator
- Patrick Dempsey, actor
- Fritz Grobe, professional juggler and co-founder of Eepybird
- Terry Hayes, State Representative and State Treasurer
- Ray Lamontagne, singer and songwriter
- John Davis Long, Secretary of the Navy, 32nd governor of Massachusetts
- Virgil D. Parris, US congressman
- Thomas Phelps, naval officer
- Charles H. Prince, US congressman
- Albion Woodbury Small, sociologist and educator
- Seba Smith, humorist and writer

== Gallery ==
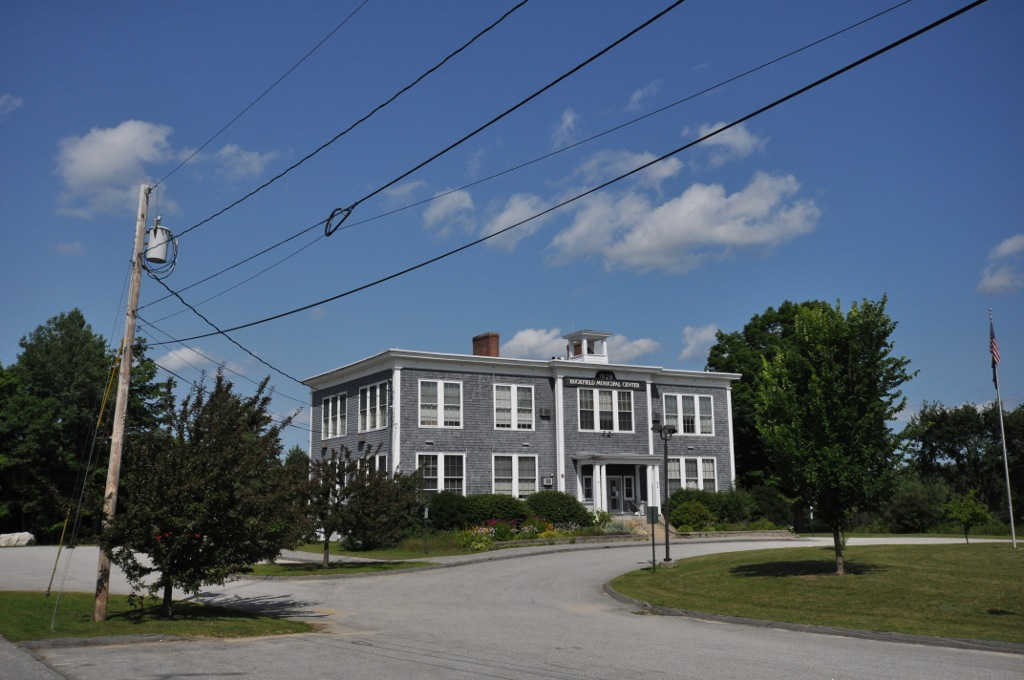
Buckfield municipal building

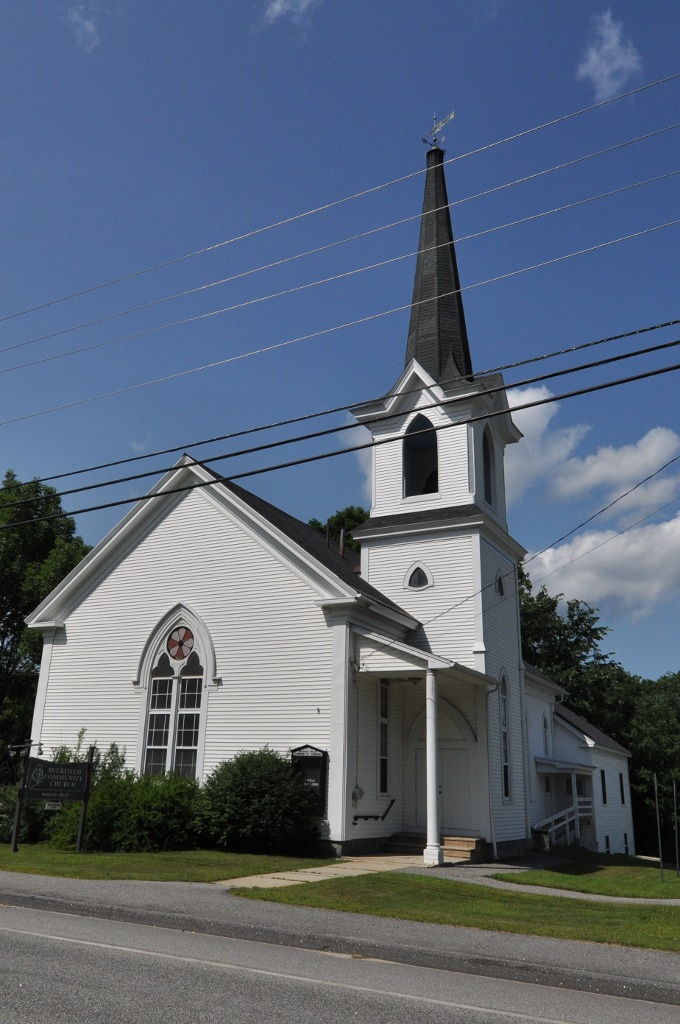
Buckfield Community Baptist Church

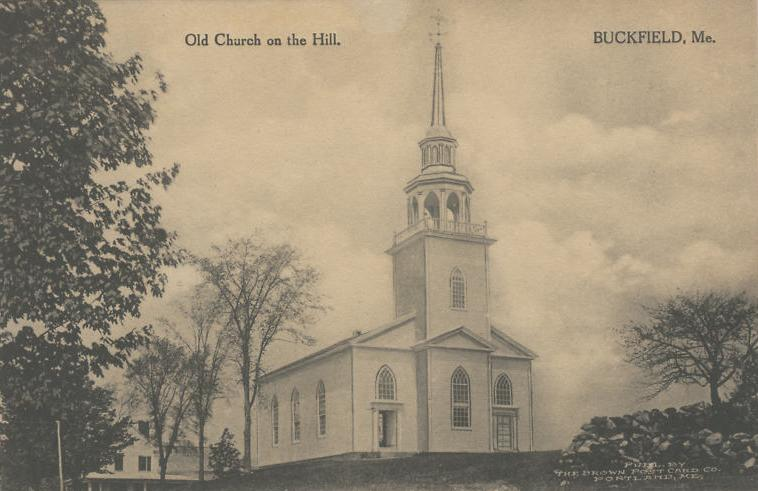
Postcard of the Old Church on the Hill, High Street Buckfield

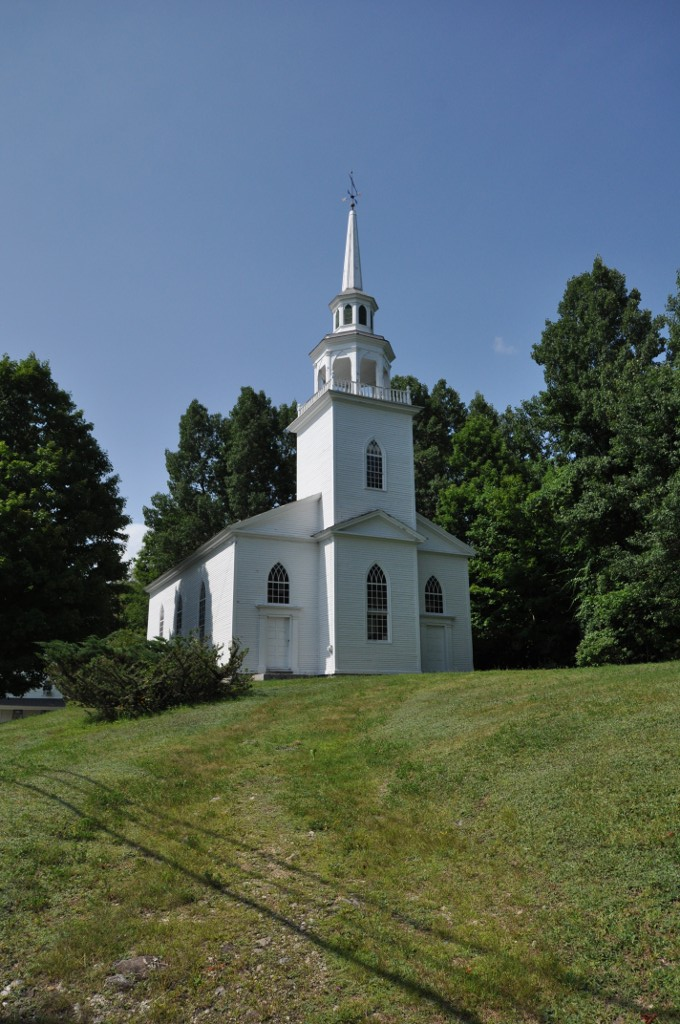
The Old Church on the Hill, also called the Union Church, Buckfield

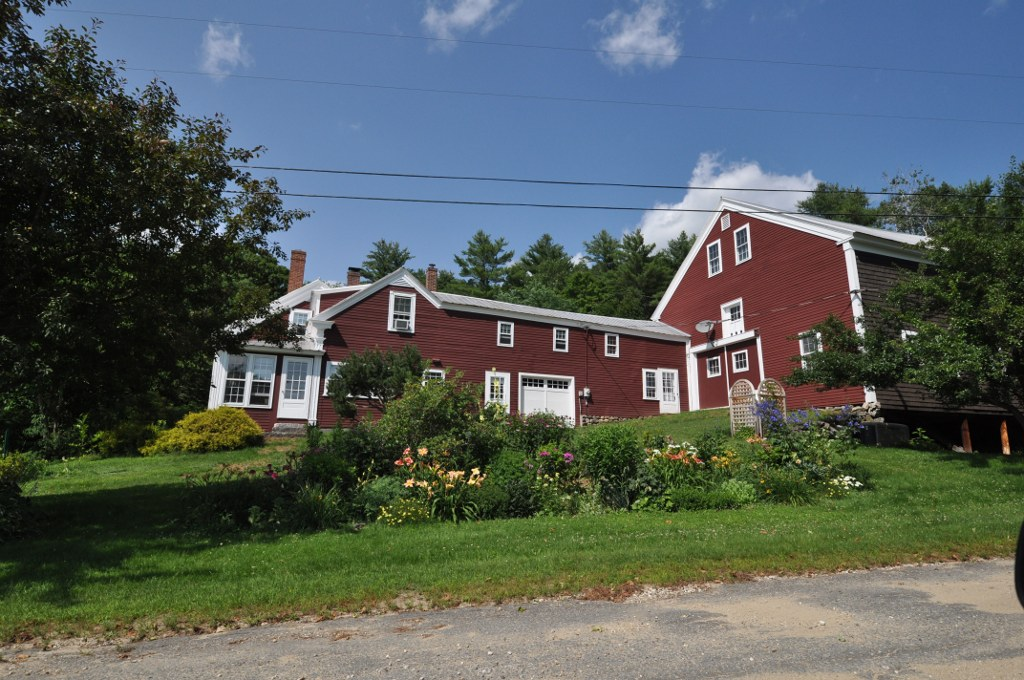
The Record Homestead on Bean Road in Buckfield

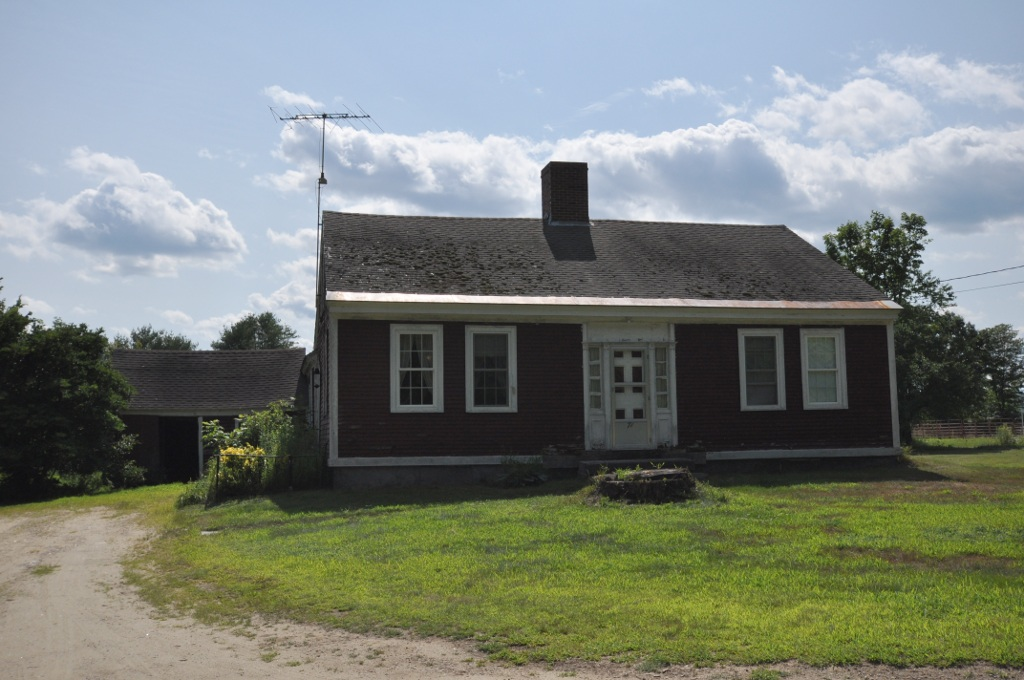
The Enoch Hall House on Bean Road in Buckfield

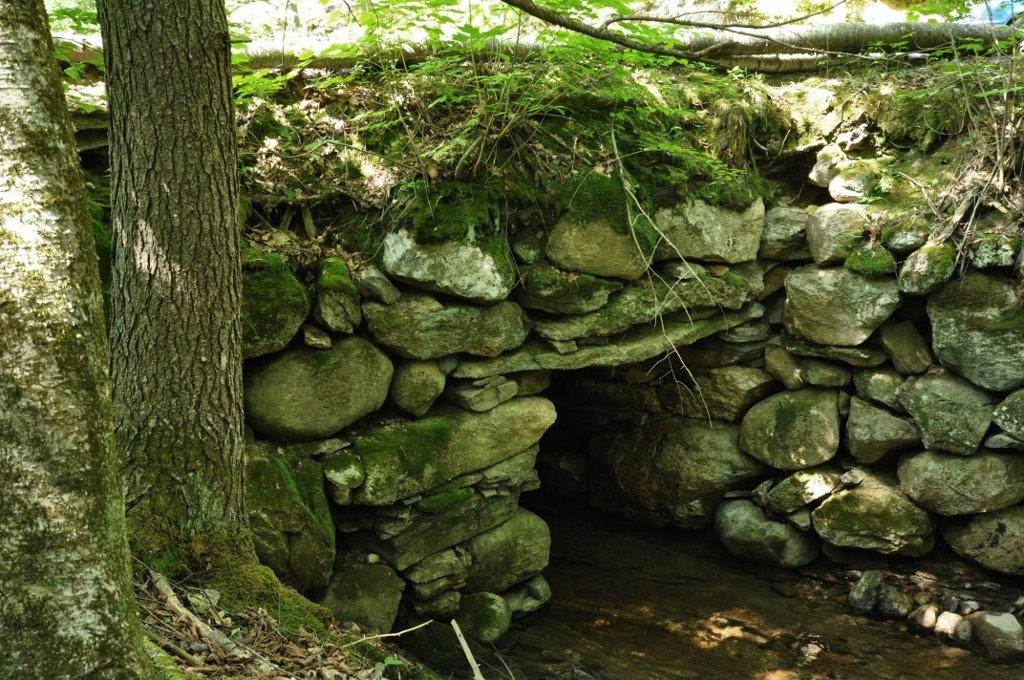
The Churchill Bridge on Mountain Road in Buckfield
