= 1808 United States House of Representatives election in Georgia =

In November 1808, the four incumbent delegates representing Georgia in the United States Congress were declared re-elected for another term. Both they and their opponents were Democratic-Republicans.

District	Incumbent			This race	
District	Representative	Party	First elected	Results	Candidates
Georgia at-large 4 seats on a general ticket	William W. Bibb	Democratic-Republican	1806	Incumbent re-elected.	√ William W. Bibb (Democratic-Republican) 22.7% √ George Troup (Democratic-Republican) 22.2% √ Howell Cobb (Democratic-Republican) 20.6% √ Dennis Smelt (Democratic-Republican) 14.8% James E. Houston (Democratic-Republican) 11.1% John M. Dooley (Democratic-Republican) 8.6%
Georgia at-large 4 seats on a general ticket	George M. Troup	Democratic-Republican	1806	Incumbent re-elected.	√ William W. Bibb (Democratic-Republican) 22.7% √ George Troup (Democratic-Republican) 22.2% √ Howell Cobb (Democratic-Republican) 20.6% √ Dennis Smelt (Democratic-Republican) 14.8% James E. Houston (Democratic-Republican) 11.1% John M. Dooley (Democratic-Republican) 8.6%
Georgia at-large 4 seats on a general ticket	Howell Cobb	Democratic-Republican	1806	Incumbent re-elected.	√ William W. Bibb (Democratic-Republican) 22.7% √ George Troup (Democratic-Republican) 22.2% √ Howell Cobb (Democratic-Republican) 20.6% √ Dennis Smelt (Democratic-Republican) 14.8% James E. Houston (Democratic-Republican) 11.1% John M. Dooley (Democratic-Republican) 8.6%
Georgia at-large 4 seats on a general ticket	Dennis Smelt	Democratic-Republican	1806 (Special)	Incumbent re-elected.	√ William W. Bibb (Democratic-Republican) 22.7% √ George Troup (Democratic-Republican) 22.2% √ Howell Cobb (Democratic-Republican) 20.6% √ Dennis Smelt (Democratic-Republican) 14.8% James E. Houston (Democratic-Republican) 11.1% John M. Dooley (Democratic-Republican) 8.6%

== See also ==
- United States House of Representatives elections, 1808 and 1809
- List of United States representatives from Georgia
