= List of United States representatives from Georgia =

The following is an alphabetical list of United States representatives from the state of Georgia. For chronological tables of members of both houses of the United States Congress from the state (through the present day), see Georgia's congressional delegations. The list of names should be complete, but other data may be incomplete.

== Current representatives ==
Current as of August 25, 2026.

- 1st district: Buddy Carter (R) (since 2015)
- 2nd district: Sanford Bishop (D) (since 1993)
- 3rd district: Brian Jack (R) (since 2025)
- 4th district: Hank Johnson (D) (since 2007)
- 5th district: Nikema Williams (D) (since 2021)
- 6th district: Lucy McBath (D) (since 2019)
- 7th district: Rich McCormick (R) (since 2023)
- 8th district: Austin Scott (R) (since 2011)
- 9th district: Andrew Clyde (R) (since 2021)
- 10th district: Mike Collins (R) (since 2023)
- 11th district: Barry Loudermilk (R) (since 2015)
- 12th district: Rick W. Allen (R) (since 2015)
- 13th district: Everton Blair (D) (since 2026)
- 14th district: Clay Fuller (R) (since 2026)

== List of members ==
Representative	Years	Party	District	Electoral history
Joel Abbot	March 4, 1817 – March 3, 1825	Democratic-Republican	At-large	Elected in 1816. Retired.
William C. Adamson	March 4, 1897 – December 18, 1917	Democratic	4th	Elected in 1896. Resigned to become member of the Board of U.S. General Appraisers.
Julius C. Alford	January 2, 1837 – March 3, 1837	Anti-Jacksonian	At-large	Elected to finish Towns's term. Lost election to the full term.
Julius C. Alford	March 4, 1839 – October 1, 1841	Whig	At-large	Elected in 1838. Re-elected in 1840 but resigned prior to the start of term.
Rick Allen	January 3, 2015 – present	Republican	12th	Elected in 2014. Incumbent.
Jack Bailey	March 4, 1851 – March 3, 1853	States Rights	3rd	Elected in 1851. Changed parties.
Jack Bailey	March 4, 1853 – March 3, 1855	Democratic	3rd	Re-elected in 1853 as a Democrat. Retired.
Abraham Baldwin	March 4, 1789 – March 3, 1793	Anti-Administration	2nd	Elected in 1789. Redistricted to the at-large district.
Abraham Baldwin	March 4, 1793 – March 3, 1795	Anti-Administration	At-large	Redistricted from the 2nd district and re-elected in 1792. Changed parties.
Abraham Baldwin	March 4, 1795 – March 3, 1799	Democratic-Republican	At-large	Re-elected in 1794 as a Democratic-Republican. Lost re-election to Jones and Taliaferro.
Doug Barnard Jr.	January 3, 1977 – January 3, 1993	Democratic	10th	Elected in 1976. Retired.
George Barnes	March 4, 1885 – March 3, 1891	Democratic	10th	Elected in 1884. Lost renomination to Watson.
William Barnett	October 5, 1812 – March 3, 1815	Democratic-Republican	At-large	Elected to finish Cobb's term. Lost re-election to six others. (Note: Forsyth, Cuthbert, Lumpkin, Wilde, Hall, and Telfair.)
Bob Barr	January 3, 1995 – January 3, 2003	Republican	7th	Elected in 1994. Lost renomination to Linder.
John Barrow	January 3, 2005 – January 3, 2015	Democratic	12th	Elected in 2004. Lost re-election to Allen.
Charles L. Bartlett	March 4, 1895 – March 3, 1915	Democratic	6th	Elected in 1894. Retired.
Erasmus W. Beck	December 2, 1872 – March 3, 1873	Democratic	4th	Elected to finish Speer's term. Retired.
Hiram P. Bell	March 4, 1873 – March 3, 1875	Democratic	9th	Elected in 1872. Retired.
Hiram P. Bell	March 13, 1877 – March 3, 1879	Democratic	9th	Elected to finish Hill's term. Lost renomination to Speer.
Thomas M. Bell	March 4, 1905 – March 3, 1931	Democratic	9th	Elected in 1904. Lost renomination to Wood.
Marion Bethune	December 22, 1870 – March 3, 1871	Republican	3rd	Elected to finish Edwards's term. Retired.
William W. Bibb	January 26, 1807 – November 6, 1813	Democratic-Republican	At-large	Elected to finish Spalding's term. Resigned to become U.S. senator.
John S. Bigby	March 4, 1871 – March 3, 1873	Republican	3rd	Elected in 1870. Redistricted to the 4th district and lost renomination to Bethune.
Sanford Bishop	January 3, 1993 – present	Democratic	2nd	Elected in 1992. Incumbent.
Edward J. Black	March 4, 1839 – March 3, 1841	Whig	At-large	Elected in 1838. Lost re-election as a Democrat to nine others. (Note: Dawson, Nisbet, Habersham, Foster, Warren, Alford, King, Gamble, and Meriwether.)
Edward J. Black	January 3, 1842 – March 3, 1845	Democratic	At-large	Elected in 1842. Redistricted to the 8th district and lost re-election to Toombs.
George R. Black	March 4, 1881 – March 3, 1883	Democratic	1st	Elected in 1880. Lost renomination to Nicholls.
James C. C. Black	March 4, 1893 – March 3, 1895	Democratic	10th	Elected in 1892. Resigned to contest a special election.
James C. C. Black	October 2, 1895 – March 3, 1897	Democratic	10th	Elected to finish his own term. Retired.
Benjamin B. Blackburn	January 3, 1967 – January 3, 1975	Republican	4th	Elected in 1966. Lost re-election to Levitas.
Everton Blair	August 25, 2026 – present	Democratic	13th	Elected to finish David Scott's term. Incumbent
Iris Blitch	January 3, 1955 – January 3, 1963	Democratic	8th	Elected in 1954. Retired.
James H. Blount	March 4, 1873 – March 3, 1893	Democratic	6th	Elected in 1872. Retired.
Carolyn Bourdeaux	January 3, 2021 – January 3, 2023	Democratic	7th	Elected in 2020. Lost renomination to McBath.
Charles H. Brand	March 4, 1917 – March 3, 1933	Democratic	8th	Elected in 1916. Redistricted to the 10th district.
Charles H. Brand	March 4, 1933 – May 17, 1933	Democratic	10th	Redistricted from the 8th district and re-elected in 1932. Died.
William G. Brantley	March 4, 1897 – March 3, 1913	Democratic	11th	Elected in 1896. Retired.
Jack Brinkley	January 3, 1967 – January 3, 1983	Democratic	3rd	Elected in 1966. Retired.
Paul Broun	July 17, 2007 – January 3, 2015	Republican	10th	Elected to finish Norwood's term. Retired to run for U.S. senator.
Paul Brown	July 5, 1933 – January 3, 1961	Democratic	10th	Elected to finish Brand's term. Retired.
Joseph Bryan	March 4, 1803 – ????, 1806	Democratic-Republican	At-large	Elected in 1802. Resigned.
Hugh Buchanan	March 4, 1881 – March 3, 1885	Democratic	4th	Elected in 1880. Retired.
Max Burns	January 3, 2003 – January 3, 2005	Republican	12th	Elected in 2002. Lost re-election to Barrow.
Thomas B. Cabaniss	March 4, 1893 – March 3, 1895	Democratic	6th	Elected in 1892. Lost renomination to Bartlett.
Bo Callaway	January 3, 1965 – January 3, 1967	Republican	3rd	Elected in 1964. Retired to run for governor.
A. Sidney Camp	August 1, 1939 – July 24, 1954	Democratic	4th	Elected to finish Owens's term. Died.
Allen D. Candler	March 4, 1883 – March 3, 1891	Democratic	9th	Elected in 1882. Retired.
Milton A. Candler	March 4, 1875 – March 3, 1879	Democratic	5th	Elected in 1874. Retired.
Henry H. Carlton	March 4, 1887 – March 3, 1891	Democratic	8th	Elected in 1886. Retired.
Thomas P. Carnes	March 4, 1793 – March 3, 1795	Anti-Administration	At-large	Elected in 1792. Lost re-election to Milledge and Baldwin.
Buddy Carter	January 3, 2015 – present	Republican	1st	Elected in 2014. Incumbent.
George Cary	March 4, 1823 – March 3, 1825	Democratic-Republican	At-large	Elected in 1822. Changed parties.
George Cary	March 4, 1825 – March 3, 1827	Jacksonian	At-large	Re-elected in 1824 as a Jacksonian. Retired.
Bryant T. Castellow	November 8, 1932 – January 3, 1937	Democratic	3rd	Elected to finish Castellow's term. Retired
Saxby Chambliss	January 3, 1995 – January 3, 2003	Republican	8th	Elected in 1994. Retired to run for U.S. senator.
Absalom H. Chappell	October 2, 1843 – March 3, 1845	Whig	At-large	Elected to finish Lamar's term. Redistricted to the 3rd district and lost re-election to Poe.
Elijah W. Chastain	March 4, 1851 – March 3, 1853	Unionist	5th	Elected in 1851. Changed parties.
Elijah W. Chastain	March 4, 1853 – March 3, 1855	Democratic	5th	Re-elected in 1853 as a Democrat. Retired.
Augustin S. Clayton	January 21, 1832 – March 3, 1835	Jacksonian	At-large	Elected to finish Lumpkin's term. Retired.
Judson C. Clements	March 4, 1881 – March 3, 1891	Democratic	7th	Elected in 1880. Lost renomination to Everett.
Jesse F. Cleveland	October 5, 1835 – March 3, 1837	Jacksonian	At-large	Elected to finish Schley's term. Changed parties.
Jesse F. Cleveland	March 4, 1837 – March 3, 1839	Democratic	At-large	Re-elected in 1836 as a Democrat. Retired.
Joseph W. Clift	July 25, 1868 – March 3, 1869	Republican	1st	Elected to the vacant seat post-Reconstruction. Re-elected to the full term but not permitted to take seat.
Duncan L. Clinch	February 15, 1844 – March 3, 1845	Whig	At-large	Elected to finish Millen's term. Retired.
Andrew Clyde	January 3, 2021 – present	Republican	9th	Elected in 2020. Incumbent.
Howell Cobb Sr.	March 4, 1807 – ????, 1812	Democratic-Republican	At-large	Elected in 1806. Resigned.
Howell Cobb	March 4, 1843 – March 3, 1845	Democratic	At-large	Elected in 1842. Redistricted to the 6th district.
Howell Cobb	March 4, 1845 – March 3, 1851	Democratic	6th	Redistricted from the at-large district and re-elected in 1844. Retired.
Howell Cobb	March 4, 1855 – March 3, 1857	Democratic	6th	Elected in 1855. Retired.
Thomas W. Cobb	March 4, 1817 – December 6, 1824	Democratic-Republican	At-large	Elected in 1816. Resigned to become U.S. senator.
John E. Coffee	March 4, 1833 – September 25, 1836	Jacksonian	At-large	Elected in 1832. Died.
Doug Collins	January 3, 2013 – January 3, 2021	Republican	9th	Elected in 2012. Retired to run for U.S. senator.
Mac Collins	January 3, 1993 – January 3, 2003	Republican	3rd	Elected in 1992. Redistricted to the 8th district.
Mac Collins	January 3, 2003 – January 3, 2005	Republican	8th	Redistricted from the 3rd district and re-elected in 2002. Retired to run for U.S. senator.
Mike Collins	January 3, 2023 – present	Republican	10th	Elected in 2022. Incumbent.
Alfred H. Colquitt	March 4, 1853 – March 3, 1855	Democratic	2nd	Elected in 1853. Retired.
Walter T. Colquitt	March 4, 1839 – July 21, 1840	Whig	At-large	Elected in 1838. Resigned.
Walter T. Colquitt	January 3, 1842 – March 3, 1843	Democratic	At-large	Elected to finish Nisbet's term. Retired.
Philip Cook	March 4, 1873 – March 3, 1883	Democratic	3rd	Elected in 1872. Retired.
Zadock Cook	December 2, 1816 – March 3, 1819	Democratic-Republican	At-large	Elected to finish to Cuthbert's term. Retired.
Mark A. Cooper	March 4, 1839 – March 3, 1841	Whig	At-large	Elected in 1838. Lost re-election as a Democrat to nine others.
Mark A. Cooper	June 3, 1842 – June 26, 1843	Democratic	At-large	Elected to finish Dawson's term. Resigned to run for governor.
Stephen A. Corker	December 22, 1870 – March 3, 1871	Democratic	5th	Elected to finish Prince's term. Retired.
E. Eugene Cox	March 4, 1925 – December 24, 1952	Democratic	2nd	Elected in 1924. Elected in 1952 but died prior to the start of term.
George W. Crawford	January 7, 1843 – March 3, 1843	Whig	At-large	Elected to finish Habersham's term. Retired.
Joel Crawford	March 4, 1817 – March 3, 1821	Democratic-Republican	At-large	Elected in 1816. Retired.
Martin J. Crawford	March 4, 1855 – January 23, 1861	Democratic	2nd	Elected in 1855. Withdrew.
Charles F. Crisp	March 4, 1883 – October 23, 1896	Democratic	3rd	Elected in 1882. Died.
Charles R. Crisp	December 19, 1896 – March 3, 1897	Democratic	3rd	Elected to finish his father's term. Retired.
Charles R. Crisp	March 4, 1913 – October 7, 1932	Democratic	3rd	Elected in 1912. Resigned to become member of U.S. Tariff Commission.
Alfred Cuthbert	December 13, 1813 – November 9, 1816	Democratic-Republican	At-large	Elected to finish Bibb's term. Lost re-election to six others and resigned early. (Note: Terrell, Crawford, Abbot, Cook, Cobb, and Forsyth.)
Alfred Cuthbert	March 4, 1821 – March 3, 1825	Democratic-Republican	At-large	Elected in 1820. Changed parties.
Alfred Cuthbert	March 4, 1825 – March 3, 1827	Jacksonian	At-large	Re-elected in 1824 as a Jacksonian. Redistricted to the 6th district and lost re-election to Fort.
John A. Cuthbert	March 4, 1819 – March 3, 1821	Democratic-Republican	At-large	Elected in 1818. Retired.
Buddy Darden	November 8, 1983 – January 3, 1995	Democratic	7th	Elected to finish McDonald's term. Lost re-election to Barr.
James C. Davis	January 3, 1947 – January 3, 1963	Democratic	5th	Elected in 1946. Lost renomination to Weltner.
John W. Davis	January 3, 1961 – January 3, 1975	Democratic	7th	Elected in 1960. Lost renomination to McDonald.
William C. Dawson	November 7, 1836 – March 3, 1837	States Rights	At-large	Elected to finish Coffee's term. Changed parties.
William C. Dawson	March 4, 1837 – November 13, 1841	Whig	At-large	Re-elected in 1836 as a Whig. Resigned to run for governor.
Nathan Deal	January 3, 1993 – April 10, 1995	Democratic	9th	Elected in 1992. Changed parties.
Nathan Deal	April 10, 1995 – January 3, 2003	Republican	9th	Changed parties and re-elected in 1996 as a Republican. Redistricted to the 10th district.
Nathan Deal	January 3, 2003 – January 3, 2007	Republican	10th	Redistricted from the 9th district and re-elected in 2002. Redistricted to the 9th district.
Nathan Deal	January 3, 2007 – March 21, 2010	Republican	9th	Redistricted from the 10th district and re-elected in 2006. Resigned to run for governor.
Braswell Deen	March 4, 1933 – January 3, 1939	Democratic	8th	Elected in 1932. Retired.
William B. W. Dent	March 4, 1853 – March 3, 1855	Democratic	4th	Elected in 1853. Retired.
Dudley M. DuBose	March 4, 1871 – March 3, 1873	Democratic	5th	Elected in 1870. Redistricted to the 8th district, lost renomination to Wright, and lost re-election as an Independent Democrat.
Peter Early	January 10, 1803 – March 3, 1807	Democratic-Republican	At-large	Elected to finish Milledge's term. Retired.
Charles G. Edwards	March 4, 1907 – March 3, 1917	Democratic	1st	Elected in 1906. Retired.
Charles G. Edwards	March 4, 1925 – July 13, 1931	Democratic	1st	Elected in 1924. Died.
William P. Edwards	July 25, 1868 – March 3, 1869	Republican	3rd	Elected to the vacant seat post-Reconstruction. Re-elected to the full term but not permitted to take seat.
Billy Lee Evans	January 3, 1977 – January 3, 1983	Democratic	8th	Elected in 1976. Lost renomination to Rowland.
Robert W. Everett	March 4, 1891 – March 3, 1893	Democratic	7th	Elected in 1890. Retired.
William H. Felton	March 4, 1875 – March 3, 1881	Democratic	7th	Elected in 1874. Lost re-election to Clements as an Independent Democrat.
Drew Ferguson	January 3, 2017 – January 3, 2025	Republican	3rd	Elected in 2016. Retired.
William B. Fleming	February 10, 1879 – March 3, 1879	Democratic	1st	Elected to finish Hartridge's term. Retired.
William H. Fleming	March 4, 1897 – March 3, 1903	Democratic	10th	Elected in 1896. Lost renomination to Hardwick.
John Floyd	March 4, 1827 – March 3, 1829	Democratic	7th	Elected in 1826. Retired.
John Flynt	November 2, 1954 – January 3, 1965	Democratic	4th	Elected in 1954. Redistricted to the 6th district.
John Flynt	January 3, 1965 – January 3, 1979	Democratic	6th	Redistricted from the 4th district and re-elected in 1964. Retired.
Tic Forrester	January 3, 1951 – January 3, 1965	Democratic	3rd	Elected in 1950. Retired.
John Forsyth	March 4, 1813 – November 23, 1818	Democratic-Republican	At-large	Elected in 1812. Re-elected in 1818 but resigned to become U.S. senator.
John Forsyth	March 4, 1823 – March 3, 1825	Democratic-Republican	At-large	Elected in 1822. Changed parties.
John Forsyth	March 4, 1825 – March 3, 1827	Jacksonian	At-large	Re-elected in 1824 as a Jacksonian. Redistricted to the 2nd district.
John Forsyth	March 4, 1827 – November 7, 1827	Jacksonian	2nd	Redistricted from the at-large district and re-elected in 1826. Resigned.
Tomlinson Fort	March 4, 1827 – March 3, 1829	Jacksonian	6th	Elected in 1826. Retired.
Nathaniel G. Foster	March 4, 1855 – March 3, 1857	Know Nothing	7th	Elected in 1855. Retired.
Thomas F. Foster	March 4, 1829 – March 3, 1835	Democratic-Republican	At-large	Elected in 1828. Lost re-election as a National Republican to nine others. (Note: Wayne, Schley, Towns, Coffee, Owens, Terrell, Grantland, Sanford, and Haynes.)
Thomas F. Foster	March 4, 1841 – March 3, 1843	Whig	At-large	Elected in 1840. Retired.
Wyche Fowler	April 6, 1977 – January 3, 1987	Democratic	5th	Elected to finish Young's term. Retired to run for U.S. senator.
James C. Freeman	March 4, 1873 – March 3, 1875	Republican	5th	Elected in 1872. Lost renomination to Mills.
Clay Fuller	April 7, 2026 – present	Republican	14th	Elected to finish Greene's term. Incumbent
Roger L. Gamble	March 4, 1833 – March 3, 1835	Jacksonian	At-large	Elected in 1832. Lost re-election as a National Republican to nine others.
Roger L. Gamble	March 4, 1841 – March 3, 1843	Whig	At-large	Elected in 1840. Lost re-election to eight others. (Note: Cooper, Lamar, Stiles, Haralson, Cobb, Millen, Black, and Lumpkin.)
Lucius J. Gartrell	March 4, 1857 – January 23, 1861	Democratic	4th	Elected in 1857. Withdrew.
Florence R. Gibbs	October 1, 1940 – January 3, 1941	Democratic	8th	Elected to finish her husband's term. Retired.
W. Benjamin Gibbs	January 3, 1939 – August 7, 1940	Democratic	8th	Elected in 1938. Died.
John S. Gibson	January 3, 1941 – January 3, 1947	Democratic	8th	Elected in 1940. Lost renomination to Wheeler.
George R. Gilmer	March 4, 1821 – March 3, 1823	Democratic-Republican	At-large	Elected in 1820. Retired.
George R. Gilmer	October 1, 1827 – March 3, 1829	Jacksonian	1st	Elected to finish Tattnall's term. Redistricted to the at-large district and re-elected in 1828 but declined to serve.
George R. Gilmer	March 4, 1833 – March 3, 1835	Jacksonian	At-large	Elected in 1832. Lost re-election as a National Republican to 9 others.
Phil Gingrey	January 3, 2003 – January 3, 2015	Republican	11th	Elected in 2002. Retired to run for U.S. senator.
Newt Gingrich	January 3, 1979 – January 3, 1999	Republican	6th	Elected in 1978. Re-elected in 1998 but resigned prior to start of term.
Bo Ginn	January 3, 1973 – January 3, 1983	Democratic	1st	Elected in 1972. Retired to run for governor.
Thomas Glascock	October 5, 1835 – March 3, 1837	Jacksonian	At-large	Elected to finish Sanford's term. Changed parties.
Thomas Glascock	March 4, 1837 – March 3, 1839	Democratic	At-large	Re-elected in 1836 as a Democrat. Retired.
Samuel F. Gove	July 25, 1868 – March 3, 1869	Republican	4th	Elected to the vacant seat post-Reconstruction. Re-elected to the full term but not permitted to take seat.
Seaton Grantland	March 4, 1835 – March 3, 1837	Jacksonian	At-large	Elected in 1834. Changed parties.
Seaton Grantland	March 4, 1837 – March 3, 1839	Democratic	At-large	Re-elected in 1836 as a Democrat. Retired.
Tom Graves	June 8, 2010 – January 3, 2013	Republican	9th	Elected to finish Deal's term. Redistricted to the 14th district.
Tom Graves	January 3, 2013 – October 4, 2020	Republican	14th	Redistricted from the 9th district and re-elected in 2012. Resigned.
Marjorie Taylor Greene	January 3, 2021 – January 5, 2026	Republican	14th	Elected in 2020. Resigned.
James M. Griggs	March 4, 1897 – January 5, 1910	Democratic	2nd	Elected in 1896. Died.
Thomas W. Grimes	March 4, 1887 – March 3, 1891	Democratic	4th	Elected in 1886. Lost renomination to Moses.
Richard W. Habersham	March 4, 1839 – December 2, 1842	Whig	At-large	Elected in 1838. Lost re-election to eight others and died prior to the start of the next term.
Thomas C. Hackett	March 4, 1849 – March 3, 1851	Democratic	5th	Elected in 1848. Retired.
G. Elliott Hagan	January 3, 1961 – January 3, 1973	Democratic	1st	Elected in 1960. Lost renomination to Ginn.
Bolling Hall	March 4, 1811 – March 3, 1817	Democratic-Republican	At-large	Elected in 1810. Retired.
Kwanza Hall	December 1, 2020 – January 3, 2021	Democratic	5th	Elected to finish Lewis's term. Retired.
Nathaniel J. Hammond	March 4, 1879 – March 3, 1887	Democratic	5th	Elected in 1878. Retired.
Samuel Hammond	March 4, 1803 – February 2, 1805	Democratic-Republican	At-large	Elected in 1802. Retired and resigned to become Civil and Military Governor of upper Louisiana Territory.
Karen Handel	June 20, 2017 – January 3, 2019	Republican	6th	Elected to finish Price's term. Lost re-election to McBath.
Hugh A. Haralson	March 4, 1843 – March 3, 1845	Democratic	At-large	Elected in 1842. Redistricted to the 4th district.
Hugh A. Haralson	March 4, 1845 – March 3, 1851	Democratic	4th	Redistricted from the at-large district and re-elected in 1844. Retired.
Thomas Hardeman Jr.	March 4, 1859 – January 23, 1861	Opposition	3rd	Elected in 1859. Withdrew.
Thomas Hardeman Jr.	March 4, 1883 – March 3, 1885	Democratic	At-large	Elected in 1882. Retired.
Thomas W. Hardwick	March 4, 1903 – November 2, 1914	Democratic	10th	Elected in 1902. Resigned to become U.S. senator.
Henry R. Harris	March 4, 1873 – March 3, 1879	Democratic	4th	Elected in 1872. Lost re-election to Persons.
Henry R. Harris	March 4, 1885 – March 3, 1887	Democratic	4th	Elected in 1884. Retired.
Julian Hartridge	March 4, 1875 – January 8, 1879	Democratic	1st	Elected in 1874. Retired and died prior to the start of the next term.
Charles Hatcher	January 3, 1981 – January 3, 1993	Democratic	2nd	Elected in 1980. Lost renomination to Bishop.
Charles E. Haynes	March 4, 1825 – March 3, 1827	Jacksonian	At-large	Elected in 1824. Redistricted to the 5th district.
Charles E. Haynes	March 4, 1827 – March 3, 1829	Jacksonian	5th	Redistricted from the at-large district and re-elected in 1826. Redistricted to the at-large district.
Charles E. Haynes	March 4, 1829 – March 3, 1831	Jacksonian	At-large	Redistricted from the 5th district and re-elected in 1828. Lost re-election to seven others. (Note: Wilde, Lumpkin, Newnan, Lamar, Foster, Wayne, and Thompson.)
Charles E. Haynes	March 4, 1835 – March 3, 1837	Jacksonian	At-large	Elected in 1834. Changed parties.
Charles E. Haynes	March 4, 1837 – March 3, 1839	Democratic	At-large	Re-elected in 1836 as a Democrat. Retired.
Jody Hice	January 3, 2015 – January 3, 2023	Republican	10th	Elected in 2014. Retired to run for Secretary of State.
Benjamin H. Hill	May 5, 1875 – March 3, 1877	Democratic	9th	Elected in 1874. Re-elected in 1876 but resigned to become U.S. senator.
Joshua Hill	March 4, 1857 – March 3, 1859	Know Nothing	7th	Elected in 1857. Changed parties.
Joshua Hill	March 4, 1859 – January 23, 1861	Opposition	7th	Re-elected in 1859 for the Opposition Party. Withdrew.
Junius Hillyer	March 4, 1851 – March 3, 1853	Unionist	6th	Elected in 1851. Changed parties.
Junius Hillyer	March 4, 1853 – March 3, 1855	Democratic	6th	Re-elected in 1853 as a Democrat. Retired.
Hopkins Holsey	October 5, 1835 – March 3, 1837	Jacksonian	At-large	Elected to finish Terrell's term. Changed parties.
Hopkins Holsey	March 4, 1837 – March 3, 1839	Democratic	At-large	Re-elected in 1836 as a Democrat. Retired.
Hines Holt	February 1, 1841 – March 3, 1841	Whig	At-large	Elected to finish Colquitt's term. Retired.
William M. Howard	March 4, 1897 – March 3, 1911	Democratic	8th	Elected in 1896. Lost re-election to Tribble.
William S. Howard	March 4, 1911 – March 3, 1919	Democratic	5th	Elected in 1910. Retired to run for U.S. senator.
Dudley M. Hughes	March 4, 1909 – March 3, 1913	Democratic	3rd	Elected in 1908. Redistricted to the 12th district.
Dudley M. Hughes	March 4, 1913 – March 3, 1917	Democratic	12th	Redistricted from the 3rd district and re-elected in 1912. Lost renomination to Larsen.
Johnny Isakson	February 23, 1999 – January 3, 2005	Republican	6th	Elected to finish Gingrich's term. Retired to run for U.S. senator.
Alfred Iverson Sr.	March 4, 1847 – March 3, 1849	Democratic	2nd	Elected in 1846. Retired.
Brian Jack	January 3, 2025 – present	Republican	3rd	Elected in 2024. Incumbent.
Jabez Y. Jackson	October 5, 1835 – March 3, 1837	Jacksonian	At-large	Elected to finish Wayne's term. Changed parties.
Jabez Y. Jackson	March 4, 1837 – March 3, 1839	Democratic	At-large	Re-elected in 1836 as a Democrat. Retired.
James Jackson	March 4, 1789 – March 3, 1791	Anti-Administration	1st	Elected in 1788. Lost re-election to Wayne.
James Jackson	March 4, 1857 – January 23, 1861	Democratic	6th	Elected in 1857. Withdrew.
Joseph W. Jackson	March 4, 1850 – March 3, 1851	Democratic	1st	Elected to finish King's term. Changed parties.
Joseph W. Jackson	March 4, 1851 – March 3, 1853	States Rights	1st	Re-elected in 1851 for the States' Rights Party. Retired.
Ed Jenkins	January 3, 1977 – January 3, 1993	Democratic	9th	Elected in 1976. Retired.
Don Johnson Jr.	January 3, 1993 – January 3, 1995	Democratic	10th	Elected in 1992. Lost re-election to Norwood.
Hank Johnson	January 3, 2007 – present	Democratic	4th	Elected in 2006. Incumbent.
James Johnson	March 4, 1851 – March 3, 1853	Unionist	2nd	Elected in 1851. Lost re-election as a Whig to Colquitt.
Ben Jones	January 3, 1989 – January 3, 1993	Democratic	4th	Elected in 1988. Redistricted to the 10th district and lost renomination to Johnson Jr.
James Jones	March 4, 1799 – January 11, 1801	Federalist	At-large	Elected in 1798. Re-elected in 1800 as a Democratic-Republican but died prior to the start of the term.
John James Jones	March 4, 1859 – January 23, 1861	Democratic	8th	Elected in 1859. Withdrew.
John William Jones	March 4, 1847 – March 3, 1849	Whig	3rd	Elected in 1846. Retired.
Seaborn Jones	March 4, 1833 – March 3, 1835	Jacksonian	At-large	Elected in 1832. Retired.
Seaborn Jones	March 4, 1845 – March 3, 1847	Democratic	2nd	Elected in 1844. Retired.
T. Butler King	March 4, 1839 – March 3, 1843	Whig	At-large	Elected in 1838. Lost re-election to eight others.
T. Butler King	March 4, 1845 – ??, 1850	Whig	1st	Elected in 1844. Resigned.
Jack Kingston	January 3, 1993 – January 3, 2015	Republican	1st	Elected in 1992. Retired to run for U.S. senator.
Henry G. Lamar	December 7, 1829 – March 3, 1833	Jacksonian	At-large	Elected to finish Gilmer's term. Lost re-election to nine others. (Note: Wayne, Wild, Gilmer, Clayton, Foster, Gamble, Jones, Schley, and Coffee.)
John B. Lamar	March 4, 1843 – July 29, 1843	Democratic	At-large	Elected in 1842. Resigned.
Phillip M. Landrum	January 3, 1953 – January 3, 1977	Democratic	9th	Elected in 1842. Retired.
Henderson L. Lanham	January 3, 1947 – November 10, 1957	Democratic	7th	Elected in 1946. Died.
William C. Lankford	March 4, 1919 – March 3, 1933	Democratic	11th	Elected in 1918. Redistricted to the 8th district and lost renomination to Deen.
William W. Larsen	March 4, 1917 – March 3, 1933	Democratic	12th	Elected in 1916. Retired.
Thomas G. Lawson	March 4, 1891 – March 3, 1897	Democratic	8th	Elected in 1890. Lost renomination to Howard.
Gordon Lee	March 4, 1905 – March 3, 1927	Democratic	7th	Elected in 1904. Retired.
Rufus E. Lester	March 4, 1889 – June 16, 1906	Democratic	1st	Elected in 1888. Died.
Elliott H. Levitas	January 3, 1975 – January 3, 1985	Democratic	4th	Elected in 1974. Lost re-election to Swindall.
Elijah B. Lewis	March 4, 1897 – March 3, 1909	Democratic	3rd	Elected in 1896. Lost renomination to Hughes.
John Lewis	January 3, 1987 – July 17, 2020	Democratic	5th	Elected in 1986. Died.
John Linder	January 3, 1993 – January 3, 1997	Republican	4th	Elected in 1992. Redistricted to the 11th district.
John Linder	January 3, 1997 – January 3, 2003	Republican	11th	Redistricted from the 4th district and re-elected in 1996. Redistricted to the 7th district.
John Linder	January 3, 2003 – January 3, 2011	Republican	7th	Redistricted from the 7th district and re-elected in 2002. Retired.
Leonidas F. Livingston	March 4, 1891 – March 3, 1911	Democratic	5th	Elected in 1890. Retired.
Jefferson F. Long	January 16, 1871 – March 3, 1871	Republican	4th	Elected to finish Clift's term. Retired.
Barry Loudermilk	January 3, 2015 – present	Republican	11th	Elected in 2014. Incumbent.
Peter E. Love	March 4, 1859 – January 23, 1861	Democratic	1st	Elected in 1859. Withdrew.
John H. Lumpkin	March 4, 1843 – March 3, 1845	Democratic	At-large	Elected in 1842. Redistricted to the 5th district.
John H. Lumpkin	March 4, 1845 – March 3, 1849	Democratic	5th	Redistricted from the at-large district and re-elected in 1844. Retired.
John H. Lumpkin	March 4, 1855 – March 3, 1857	Democratic	5th	Elected in 1855. Retired.
Wilson Lumpkin	March 4, 1815 – March 3, 1817	Democratic-Republican	At-large	Elected in 1814. Lost re-election to six others. (Note: Terrell, Crawford, Abbot, Cook, Cobb, and Forsyth.)
Wilson Lumpkin	March 4, 1827 – March 3, 1829	Jacksonian	4th	Elected in 1826. Redistricted to the at-large district.
Wilson Lumpkin	March 4, 1829 – ????, 1831	Jacksonian	At-large	Redistricted from the 4th district and re-elected in 1828. Re-elected in 1830 but resigned prior to the start of the term to run for governor.
Archibald T. MacIntyre	March 4, 1871 – March 3, 1873	Democratic	1st	Elected in 1870. Retired.
James MacKay	January 3, 1965 – January 3, 1967	Democratic	4th	Elected in 1964. Lost re-election to Blackburn.
John W. Maddox	March 4, 1893 – March 3, 1905	Democratic	7th	Elected in 1892. Retired.
Denise Majette	January 3, 2003 – January 3, 2005	Democratic	4th	Elected in 2002. Retired to run for U.S. senator.
Helen D. Mankin	February 12, 1946 – January 3, 1947	Democratic	5th	Elected to finish Ramspeck's term. Lost renomination to Davis and lost re-election as an independent.
Jim Marshall	January 3, 2003 – January 3, 2007	Democratic	3rd	Elected in 2002. Redistricted to the 8th district.
Jim Marshall	January 3, 2007 – January 3, 2011	Democratic	8th	Redistricted from the 3rd district and re-elected in 2006. Lost re-election to Scott.
George Mathews	March 4, 1789 – March 3, 1791	Anti-Administration	3rd	Elected in 1789. Lost re-election to Willis.
Dawson Mathis	January 3, 1971 – January 3, 1981	Democratic	2nd	Elected in 1970. Retired to run for U.S. senator.
Lucy McBath	January 3, 2019 – January 3, 2023	Democratic	6th	Elected in 2018. Redistricted to the 7th district.
Lucy McBath	January 3, 2023 – January 3, 2025	Democratic	7th	Redistricted from the 6th district and re-elected in 2022. Redistricted to the 6th district.
Lucy McBath	January 3, 2025 – present	Democratic	6th	Redistricted from the 7th district and re-elected in 2024. Incumbent.
Rich McCormick	January 3, 2023 – January 3, 2025	Republican	6th	Elected in 2022. Redistricted to the 7th district.
Rich McCormick	January 3, 2025 – present	Republican	7th	Redistricted from the 6th district and re-elected in 2024. Incumbent.
Larry McDonald	January 3, 1975 – September 1, 1983	Democratic	7th	Elected in 1974. Died.
Cynthia McKinney	January 3, 1993 – January 3, 1997	Democratic	11th	Elected in 1992. Redistricted to the 4th district.
Cynthia McKinney	January 3, 1997 – January 3, 2003	Democratic	4th	Redistricted from the 11th district and re-elected in 1996. Lost renomination to Majette.
Cynthia McKinney	January 3, 2005 – January 3, 2007	Democratic	4th	Elected in 2004. Lost renomination to Johnson.
Cowles Mead	March 4, 1805 – December 24, 1805	Democratic-Republican	At-large	Elected in 1804. Lost election contest for the 1804 election.
David Meriwether	December 6, 1802 – March 3, 1807	Democratic-Republican	At-large	Elected to finish Taliaferro's term. Retired.
James Meriwether	March 4, 1825 – March 3, 1827	Jacksonian	At-large	Elected in 1824. Retired.
James A. Meriwether	March 4, 1841 – March 3, 1843	Whig	At-large	Elected in 1840. Retired.
John Milledge	November 22, 1792 – March 3, 1793	Anti-Administration	1st	Elected to finish Wayne's term. Lost re-election to Baldwin and Carnes.
John Milledge	March 4, 1795 – March 3, 1799	Democratic-Republican	At-large	Elected in 1794. Retired.
John Milledge	March 4, 1801 – May ??, 1802	Democratic-Republican	At-large	Elected in 1800. Resigned.
John Millen	March 4, 1843 – October 15, 1843	Democratic	At-large	Elected in 1842. Died.
Harlan Mitchell	January 8, 1958 – January 3, 1961	Democratic	7th	Elected to finish Lanham's term. Retired to run for State Senate.
Carlton Mobley	March 2, 1932 – March 3, 1933	Democratic	6th	Elected to finish Rutherford's term. Retired.
R. Lee Moore	March 4, 1923 – March 3, 1925	Democratic	1st	Elected in 1922. Lost renomination to Edwards.
Charles L. Moses	March 4, 1891 – March 3, 1897	Democratic	4th	Elected in 1890. Lost renomination to Adamson.
Charles Murphey	March 4, 1851 – March 3, 1853	Unionist	4th	Elected in 1851. Retired.
Daniel Newnan	March 4, 1831 – March 3, 1833	Jacksonian	At-large	Elected in 1830. Lost re-election to nine others.
John C. Nicholls	March 4, 1879 – March 3, 1881	Democratic	1st	Elected in 1878. Lost renomination to Black.
John C. Nicholls	March 4, 1883 – March 3, 1885	Democratic	1st	Elected in 1882. Retired.
E. A. Nisbet	March 4, 1839 – October 12, 1841	Whig	At-large	Elected in 1838. Resigned.
Charlie Norwood	January 3, 1995 – January 3, 2003	Republican	10th	Elected in 1994. Redistricted to the 9th district.
Charlie Norwood	January 3, 2003 – January 3, 2007	Republican	9th	Redistricted from the 10th district and re-elected in 2002. Redistricted to the 10th district.
Charlie Norwood	January 3, 2007 – February 13, 2007	Republican	10th	Redistricted from the 9th district and re-elected in 2006. Died.
Thomas M. Norwood	March 4, 1885 – March 3, 1889	Democratic	1st	Elected in 1884. Retired.
Maston E. O'Neal Jr.	January 3, 1965 – January 3, 1971	Democratic	2nd	Elected in 1964. Retired.
James W. Overstreet	October 3, 1906 – March 3, 1907	Democratic	1st	Elected to finish Lester's term. Retired.
James W. Overstreet	March 4, 1917 – March 3, 1923	Democratic	1st	Elected in 1916. Lost renomination to Moore.
Allen F. Owen	March 4, 1849 – March 3, 1851	Whig	3rd	Elected in 1848. Retired.
Emmett M. Owen	March 4, 1933 – June 21, 1939	Democratic	4th	Elected in 1932. Died.
George W. Owens	March 4, 1835 – March 3, 1837	Jacksonian	At-large	Elected in 1834. Changed parties.
George W. Owens	March 4, 1837 – March 3, 1839	Democratic	At-large	Re-elected in 1836 as a Democrat. Retired.
Stephen Pace	January 3, 1937 – January 3, 1951	Democratic	3rd	Elected in 1936. Retired.
William W. Paine	December 22, 1870 – March 3, 1871	Democratic	1st	Elected to finish Clift's term. Retired.
Frank Park	November 4, 1913 – March 3, 1925	Democratic	2nd	Elected to finish Roddenbery's term. Lost renomination to Cox.
Homer C. Parker	September 9, 1931 – January 3, 1935	Democratic	1st	Elected to finish Edwards's term. Lost renomination to Peterson.
Henry Persons	March 4, 1879 – March 3, 1881	Independent Democratic	4th	Elected in 1878. Retired.
Hugh Peterson	January 3, 1935 – January 3, 1947	Democratic	1st	Elected in 1934. Lost renomination to Preston Jr.
J. L. Pilcher	February 4, 1953 – January 3, 1965	Democratic	2nd	Elected to finish Cox's term. Retired.
Prince Hulon Preston Jr.	January 3, 1947 – January 3, 1961	Democratic	1st	Elected in 1946. Lost renomination to Hagan.
Tom Price	January 3, 2005 – February 10, 2017	Republican	6th	Elected in 2004. Resigned to become U.S. Secretary of Health and Human Services.
William P. Price	December 22, 1870 – March 3, 1873	Democratic	6th	Elected to finish the vacant term. Retired.
Charles H. Prince	July 25, 1868 – March 3, 1869	Republican	5th	Elected to the vacant seat post-Reconstruction. Re-elected to the full term but not permitted to take seat.
Robert Ramspeck	October 2, 1929 – December 31, 1945	Democratic	5th	Elected to finish Steele's term. Resigned.
Morgan Rawls	March 4, 1873 – March 24, 1874	Democratic	1st	Elected in 1872. Lost contested election.
Richard Ray	January 3, 1983 – January 3, 1993	Democratic	3rd	Elected in 1982. Lost re-election to Collins.
David A. Reese	March 4, 1853 – March 3, 1855	Whig	7th	Elected in 1853. Retired.
Seaborn Reese	December 4, 1882 – March 3, 1887	Democratic	8th	Elected to finish Stephens's term. Retired.
Robert R. Reid	February 18, 1819 – March 3, 1823	Democratic-Republican	At-large	Elected to finish Forsyth's term. Retired.
Seaborn Roddenbery	February 6, 1910 – September 25, 1913	Democratic	2nd	Elected to finish Griggs's term. Died.
J. Roy Rowland	January 3, 1983 – January 3, 1995	Democratic	8th	Elected in 1982. Retired.
Tinsley W. Rucker Jr.	January 11, 1917 – March 3, 1917	Democratic	8th	Elected in to finish Tribble's term. Retired.
Benjamin E. Russell	March 4, 1893 – March 3, 1897	Democratic	2nd	Elected in 1892. Retired.
Samuel Rutherford	March 4, 1925 – February 4, 1932	Democratic	6th	Elected in 1924. Died.
John W. A. Sanford	March 4, 1835 – July 25, 1835	Jacksonian	At-large	Elected in 1834. Resigned to assist in the removal of the Cherokee Indians.
William Schley	March 4, 1833 – July 1, 1835	Jacksonian	At-large	Elected in 1832. Resigned after being nominated Governor of Georgia.
Austin Scott	January 3, 2011 – present	Republican	8th	Elected in 2010. Incumbent.
David Scott	January 3, 2003 – April 22, 2026	Democratic	13th	Elected in 2002. Died.
James Lindsay Seward	March 4, 1853 – March 3, 1859	Democratic	1st	Elected in 1853. Retired.
Andrew Sloan	March 24, 1874 – March 3, 1875	Republican	1st	Won election contest. Retired.
Dennis Smelt	September 1, 1806 – March 3, 1811	Democratic-Republican	At-large	Elected to finish Bryan's term. Retired.
William Ephraim Smith	March 4, 1875 – March 3, 1881	Democratic	2nd	Elected in 1874. Retired.
Thomas Spalding	December 24, 1805 – ????, 1806	Democratic-Republican	At-large	Won election contest. Lost re-election to Smelt, Troup, Bibb, and Cobb and resigned early.
Emory Speer	March 4, 1879 – March 3, 1883	Independent Democratic	9th	Elected in 1878. Lost re-election to Candler.
Thomas J. Speer	March 4, 1871 – August 18, 1872	Republican	4th	Elected in 1870. Died.
Leslie J. Steele	March 4, 1927 – July 14, 1929	Democratic	5th	Elected in 1926. Died.
Alexander H. Stephens	October 2, 1843 – March 3, 1845	Whig	At-large	Elected to finish Cooper's term. Redistricted to the 7th district.
Alexander H. Stephens	March 4, 1845 – March 3, 1851	Whig	7th	Redistricted from the at-large district and re-elected in 1844. Changed parties.
Alexander H. Stephens	March 4, 1851 – March 3, 1853	Unionist	7th	Re-elected in 1851 as a Unionist. Redistricted to the 8th district.
Alexander H. Stephens	March 4, 1853 – March 3, 1855	Whig	8th	Redistricted from the 7th district and re-elected in 1853 as a Whig. Changed parties.
Alexander H. Stephens	March 4, 1855 – March 3, 1859	Democratic	8th	Re-elected in 1855 as a Democrat. Retired.
Alexander H. Stephens	December 1, 1873 – November 4, 1882	Democratic	8th	Elected to finish Wright's term. Retired to run for governor and resigned when elected..
Robert Grier Stephens Jr.	January 3, 1961 – January 3, 1977	Democratic	10th	Elected in 1960. Retired.
John D. Stewart	March 4, 1887 – March 3, 1891	Democratic	5th	Elected in 1886. Lost renomination to Livingston.
William H. Stiles	March 4, 1843 – March 3, 1845	Democratic	At-large	Elected in 1842. Retired.
W. S. Stuckey Jr.	January 3, 1967 – January 3, 1977	Democratic	8th	Elected in 1966. Retired.
Pat Swindall	January 3, 1985 – January 3, 1989	Republican	4th	Elected in 1984. Lost re-election to Jones.
Benjamin Taliaferro	March 4, 1799 – March 3, 1801	Federalist	At-large	Elected in 1984. Changed parties.
Benjamin Taliaferro	March 4, 1801 – ????, 1802	Democratic-Republican	At-large	Re-elected in 1800 as a Democratic-Republican. Resigned.
Malcolm C. Tarver	March 4, 1927 – January 3, 1947	Democratic	7th	Elected in 1926. Lost renomination to Lanham.
Farish Tate	March 4, 1893 – March 3, 1905	Democratic	9th	Elected in 1892. Lost renomination to Bell.
Edward F. Tattnall	March 4, 1821 – March 3, 1825	Democratic-Republican	At-large	Elected in 1820. Changed parties.
Edward F. Tattnall	March 4, 1825 – March 3, 1827	Jacksonian	At-large	Re-elected in 1824 as a Jacksonian. Re-elected in 1826 to the 1st district but resigned prior to the start of term.
Thomas Telfair	March 4, 1813 – March 3, 1817	Democratic-Republican	At-large	Elected in 1812. Lost re-election to six others.
James C. Terrell	March 4, 1835 – July 8, 1835	Unionist	At-large	Elected in 1834. Resigned.
William Terrell	March 4, 1817 – March 3, 1821	Democratic-Republican	At-large	Elected in 1816. Retired.
Lindsay Thomas	January 3, 1983 – January 3, 1993	Democratic	1st	Elected in 1982. Retired.
Fletcher Thompson	January 3, 1967 – January 3, 1973	Republican	5th	Elected in 1966. Retired to run for U.S. senator.
Wiley Thompson	March 4, 1821 – March 3, 1825	Democratic-Republican	At-large	Elected in 1820. Changed parties.
Wiley Thompson	March 4, 1825 – March 3, 1827	Jacksonian	At-large	Re-elected in 1824 as a Jacksonian. Redistricted to the 3rd district.
Wiley Thompson	March 4, 1827 – March 3, 1829	Jacksonian	3rd	Redistricted from the at-large district and re-elected in 1826. Redistricted to the at-large district.
Wiley Thompson	March 4, 1829 – March 3, 1833	Jacksonian	At-large	Redistricted from the at-large district and re-elected in 1828. Retired.
Nelson Tift	July 25, 1868 – March 3, 1869	Democratic	2nd	Elected to the vacant seat post-Reconstruction. Re-elected to the full term but not permitted to take seat.
Robert Toombs	March 4, 1845 – March 3, 1853	Whig	8th	Elected in 1844. Retired.
George W. Towns	March 4, 1835 – September 1, 1836	Jacksonian	At-large	Elected in 1834. Resigned.
George W. Towns	March 4, 1837 – March 3, 1839	Democratic	At-large	Elected in 1834. Retired.
George W. Towns	January 5, 1846 – March 3, 1847	Democratic	3rd	Elected to finish Poe's term. Lost re-election to Jones.
Samuel J. Tribble	March 4, 1911 – December 8, 1916	Democratic	8th	Elected in 1910. Re-elected in 1916 but died prior to the start of term.
Robert P. Trippe	March 4, 1855 – March 3, 1859	Know Nothing	3rd	Elected in 1855. Retired.
George Troup	March 4, 1807 – March 3, 1815	Democratic-Republican	At-large	Elected in 1806. Retired.
Henry G. Turner	March 4, 1881 – March 3, 1893	Democratic	2nd	Elected in 1880. Redistricted to the 11th district.
Henry G. Turner	March 4, 1893 – March 3, 1897	Democratic	11th	Redistricted from the 2nd district and re-elected in 1892. Retired.
J. Russell Tuten	January 3, 1963 – January 3, 1967	Democratic	8th	Elected in 1962. Lost renomination to Stuckey Jr.
John W. H. Underwood	March 4, 1859 – January 23, 1861	Democratic	5th	Elected in 1859. Withdrew.
William D. Upshaw	March 4, 1919 – March 3, 1927	Democratic	5th	Elected in 1918. Lost renomination to Steele.
Carl Vinson	November 3, 1914 – March 3, 1933	Democratic	10th	Elected to finish Hardwick's term. Redistricted to the 6th district.
Carl Vinson	March 4, 1933 – January 3, 1965	Democratic	6th	Redistricted from the 10th district and re-elected in 1932. Retired.
John R. Walker	March 4, 1913 – Match 4, 1919	Democratic	11th	Elected in 1912. Lost renomination to Lankford.
Hiram B. Warner	March 4, 1855 – March 3, 1857	Democratic	4th	Elected in 1855. Retired.
Lott Warren	March 4, 1839 – March 3, 1843	Whig	At-large	Elected in 1838. Retired.
Thomas E. Watson	March 4, 1891 – March 3, 1893	Populist	10th	Elected in 1890. Lost re-election to Black.
Anthony Wayne	March 4, 1791 – March 21, 1792	Anti-Administration	1st	Elected in 1791. Seat declared vacant.
James M. Wayne	March 4, 1829 – January 13, 1835	Jacksonian	At-large	Elected in 1828. Elected in 1834 but resigned to become Associate Justice of the Supreme Court of the United States.
Marshall J. Wellborn	March 4, 1849 – March 3, 1851	Democratic	2nd	Elected in 1848. Retired.
Charles L. Weltner	January 3, 1963 – January 3, 1967	Democratic	5th	Elected in 1962. Retired.
Lynn Westmoreland	January 3, 2005 – January 3, 2007	Republican	8th	Elected in 2004. Redistricted to the 3rd district.
Lynn Westmoreland	January 3, 2007 – January 3, 2017	Republican	3rd	Redistricted from the 8th district and re-elected in 2006. Retired.
William M. Wheeler	January 3, 1947 – January 3, 1955	Democratic	8th	Elected in 1946. Lost renomination to Blitch.
B. Frank Whelchel	January 3, 1935 – January 3, 1945	Democratic	9th	Elected in 1934. Retired.
Richard H. Whiteley	December 22, 1870 – March 3, 1875	Republican	2nd	Elected to finish Tift's term. Lost re-election to Smith.
Richard H. Wilde	March 4, 1815 – March 3, 1817	Democratic-Republican	At-large	Elected in 1814. Lost re-election to six others.
Richard H. Wilde	February 7, 1825 – March 3, 1825	Democratic-Republican	At-large	Elected to finish Cobb's term. Retired.
Richard H. Wilde	November 17, 1827 – March 3, 1829	Jacksonian	2nd	Elected to finish Forsyth's term. Redistricted to the at-large district.
Richard H. Wilde	March 4, 1829 – March 3, 1835	Jacksonian	At-large	Redistricted from the 2nd district and re-elected in 1828. Lost re-election as a National Republican to nine others.
Nikema Williams	January 3, 2021 – present	Democratic	5th	Elected in 2020. Incumbent.
Francis Willis	March 4, 1791 – March 3, 1793	Anti-Administration	3rd	Elected in 1791. Redistricted to the at-large district and lost re-election to Baldwin and Carnes.
Thomas E. Winn	March 4, 1891 – March 3, 1893	Democratic	9th	Elected in 1890. Retired.
James W. Wise	March 4, 1915 – March 3, 1925	Democratic	6th	Elected in 1914. Retired.
John S. Wood	March 4, 1931 – January 3, 1935	Democratic	9th	Elected in 1930. Lost renomination to Whelchel.
John S. Wood	January 3, 1945 – January 3, 1953	Democratic	9th	Elected in 1944. Retired.
Rob Woodall	January 3, 2011 – January 3, 2021	Republican	7th	Elected in 2010. Retired.
Augustus R. Wright	March 4, 1857 – March 3, 1859	Democratic	5th	Elected in 1857. Retired.
William C. Wright	January 16, 1918 – March 3, 1933	Democratic	4th	Elected to finish Adamson's term. Retired.
Andrew Young	January 3, 1973 – January 29, 1977	Democratic	5th	Elected in 1972. Resigned to become U.S. Ambassador to the United Nations.
Pierce M. B. Young	July 25, 1868 – March 3, 1869	Democratic	7th	Elected to the vacant seat post-Reconstruction. Re-elected to the full term but not permitted to take seat.
Pierce M. B. Young	December 22, 1870 – March 3, 1875	Democratic	7th	Elected to finish his own term. Lost renomination to W. H. Dabney.

== See also ==
- Georgia's congressional delegations
- Georgia's congressional districts
- List of United States senators from Georgia
