= 1804 United States House of Representatives election in Georgia =

Initially, Cowles Mead (Democratic-Republican) was declared the winner of the 4th seat. The votes from Camden, Liberty and Tatnal counties were not received in time and were originally not counted. When it was later decided to count them as valid, it resulted in Thomas Spalding (Democratic-Republican) overtaking Cowles Mead for the fourth and final seat by 39 votes. Spalding was then given the seat in place of Mead.

District	Incumbent	Party	First elected	Result	Candidates
Georgia at-large 4 seats on a general ticket	Peter Early	Democratic-Republican	1802	Incumbent re-elected.	√ Peter Early (Democratic-Republican) 24.2% √ David Meriwether (Democratic-Republican) 22.9% √ Joseph Bryan (Democratic-Republican) 21.3% √ Cowles Mead (Democratic-Republican) 10.9% Thomas Spalding (Democratic-Republican) 10.5% Thomas Carr 6.7% Obadiah Jones 2.4% Thomas U.P. Charlton 1.2%
Georgia at-large 4 seats on a general ticket	David Meriwether	Democratic-Republican	1802	Incumbent re-elected.	√ Peter Early (Democratic-Republican) 24.2% √ David Meriwether (Democratic-Republican) 22.9% √ Joseph Bryan (Democratic-Republican) 21.3% √ Cowles Mead (Democratic-Republican) 10.9% Thomas Spalding (Democratic-Republican) 10.5% Thomas Carr 6.7% Obadiah Jones 2.4% Thomas U.P. Charlton 1.2%
Georgia at-large 4 seats on a general ticket	Joseph Bryan	Democratic-Republican	1802	Incumbent re-elected.	√ Peter Early (Democratic-Republican) 24.2% √ David Meriwether (Democratic-Republican) 22.9% √ Joseph Bryan (Democratic-Republican) 21.3% √ Cowles Mead (Democratic-Republican) 10.9% Thomas Spalding (Democratic-Republican) 10.5% Thomas Carr 6.7% Obadiah Jones 2.4% Thomas U.P. Charlton 1.2%
Georgia at-large 4 seats on a general ticket	Samuel Hammond	Democratic-Republican	1802	Incumbent retired. New member elected. Democratic-Republican hold. Election was later contested and a new successor named, see above.	√ Peter Early (Democratic-Republican) 24.2% √ David Meriwether (Democratic-Republican) 22.9% √ Joseph Bryan (Democratic-Republican) 21.3% √ Cowles Mead (Democratic-Republican) 10.9% Thomas Spalding (Democratic-Republican) 10.5% Thomas Carr 6.7% Obadiah Jones 2.4% Thomas U.P. Charlton 1.2%

== See also ==
- United States House of Representatives elections, 1804 and 1805
- List of United States representatives from Georgia
