= 1803 Georgia's at-large congressional district special election =

A special election was held in Georgia's at-large congressional district on October 3, 1803, to fill a vacancy caused by the resignation, before the start of the 8th Congress, of John Milledge (DR), who had been elected Governor of Georgia.

== Election results ==
Candidate	Party	Votes	Percent
Joseph Bryan	Democratic-Republican	8,102	71.3%
Matthew MacAlister	Federalist	2,230	19.6%
Cowles Mead	Democratic-Republican	1,039	9.1%

Bryan took his seat with the rest of the 8th Congress at the start of the 1st session.

== See also ==
- List of special elections to the United States House of Representatives
