= 9th United States Congress =

1805-1807 meeting of U.S. legislature

←	8th	10th	→
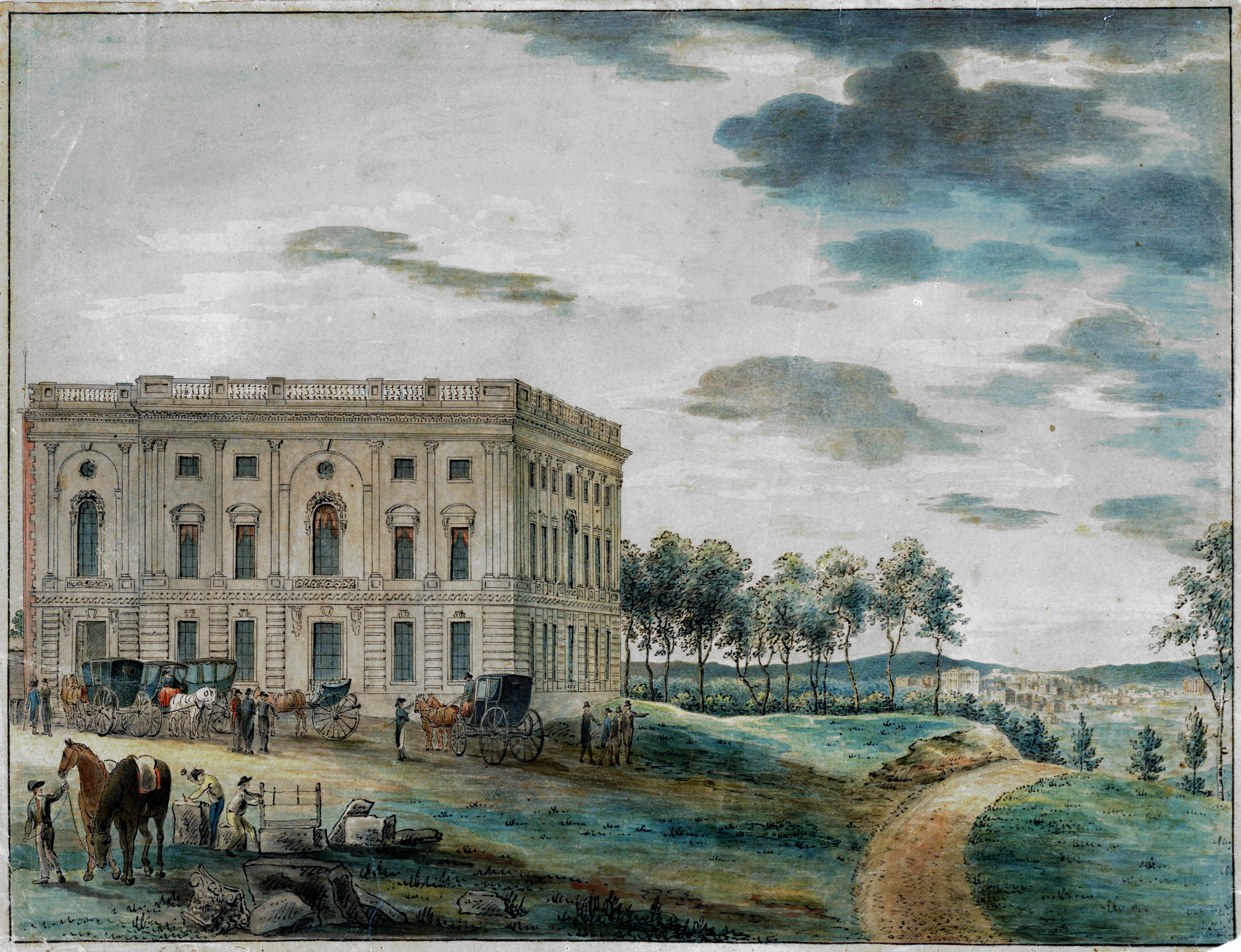
- United States Capitol (1800)

Overview
- Legislative body: United States Congress
- Jurisdiction: United States
- Term: March 4, 1805 – March 4, 1807

Senate
- Members: 34
- President: George Clinton (DR)
- President pro tempore: Samuel Smith (DR)
- Party control: Democratic-Republican

House of Representatives
- Members: 142 representatives 3 non-voting delegates
- Speaker: Nathaniel Macon (DR)
- Party control: Democratic-Republican

Sessions
- Special (Note: Special session of the Senate.): March 4, 1805 – March 4, 1805
- 1st: December 2, 1805 – April 21, 1806
- 2nd: December 1, 1806 – March 4, 1807

The 9th United States Congress was a meeting of the legislative branch of the United States federal government, consisting of the United States Senate and the United States House of Representatives. It met in Washington, D.C., from March 4, 1805, to March 4, 1807, during the fifth and sixth years of Thomas Jefferson's presidency. The apportionment of seats in the House of Representatives was based on the 1800 United States census. Both chambers had a Democratic-Republican majority.

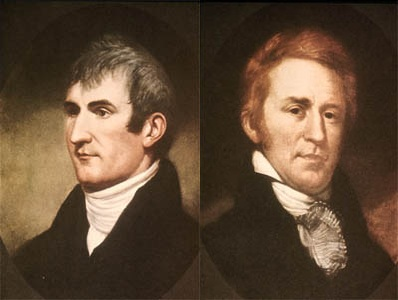
The Lewis and Clark Expedition scouted the Louisiana Territory and the Pacific Northwest.

== Major events ==
- March 4, 1805: President Thomas Jefferson begins his second term.
- June 1, 1805: First Barbary War ends.
- November 7, 1805: Lewis and Clark Expedition arrives at the Pacific Ocean.
- September 23, 1806: Lewis and Clark Expedition returns to St. Louis, Missouri, thereby ending the exploration of the Louisiana Territory and the Pacific Northwest.
- February 19, 1807: Former Vice President Aaron Burr is tried for conspiracy and acquitted.

== Major legislation ==
- March 29, 1806: Cumberland Road, ch. 19, 2 Stat. 357
- February 24, 1807: Seventh Circuit Act of 1807, ch. 16, (2 Stat. 420)
- March 2, 1807: Act Prohibiting Importation of Slaves, ch. 22, 2 Stat. 426
- March 3, 1807: Insurrection Act, ch. 39, 2 Stat. 443

== Territories organized ==
- June 30, 1805: Michigan Territory was formed from a portion of the Indiana Territory

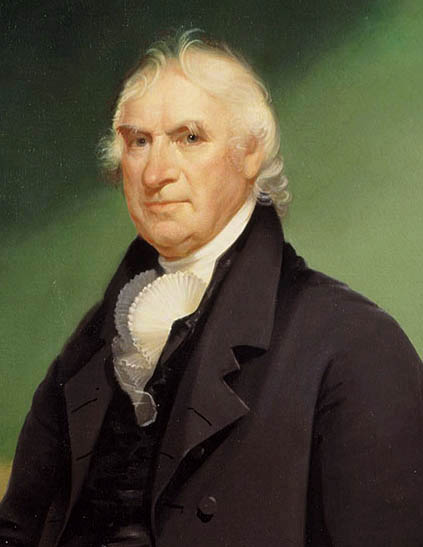
Senate President George Clinton

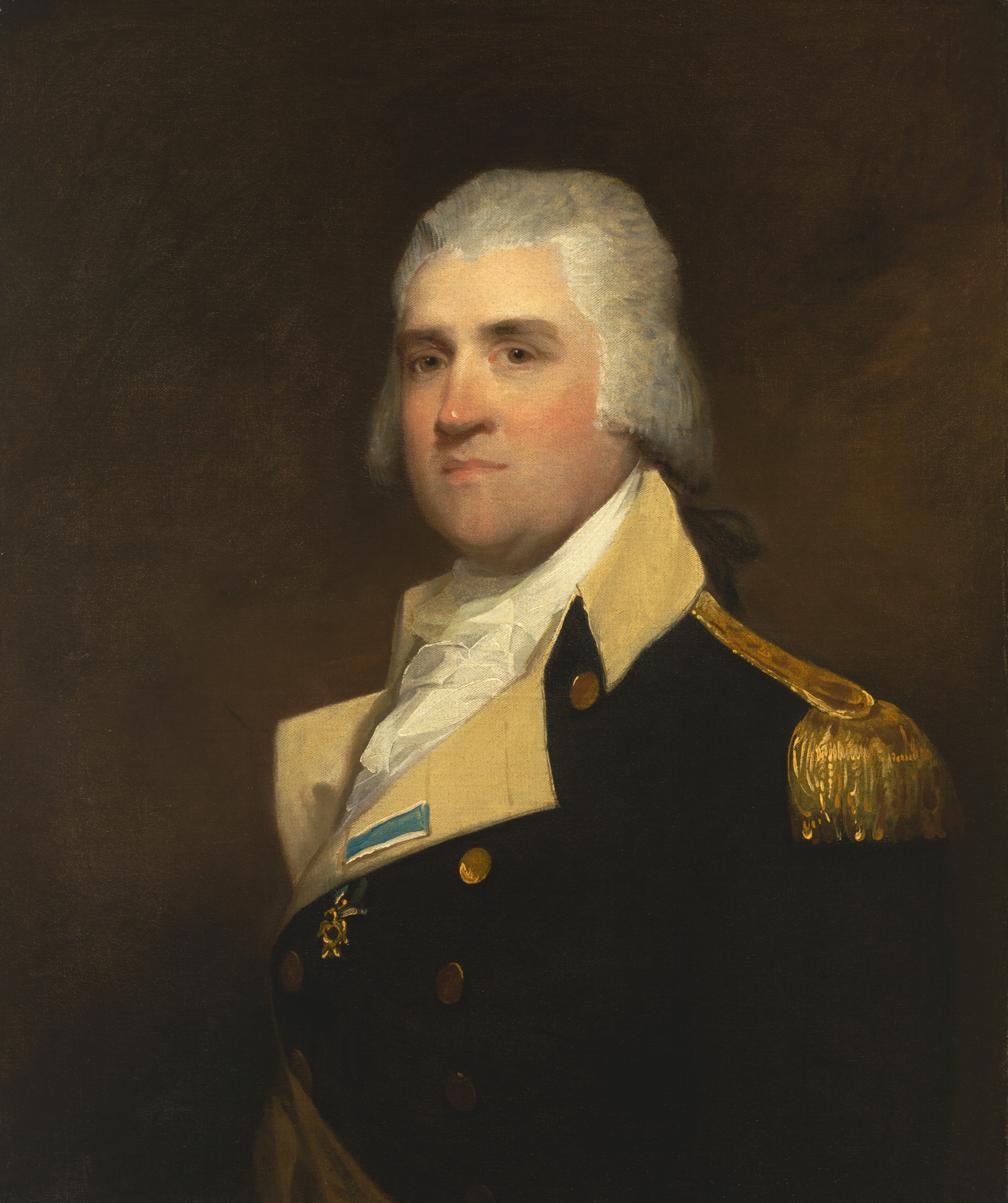
Senate President pro tempore Samuel Smith (DR)

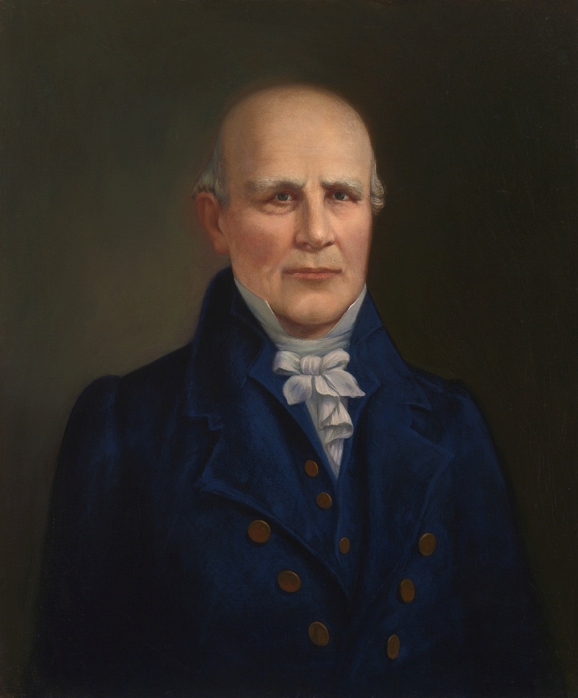
House Speaker Nathaniel Macon (DR)

== Party summary ==
The count below identifies party affiliations at the beginning of the first session of this Congress. Changes resulting from subsequent replacements are shown below in the "Changes in membership" section.

=== Senate ===
	Party (shading shows control)		Total	Vacant
	Democratic- Republican (DR)	Federalist (F)	Total	Vacant
End of previous congress	25	9	34	0
Begin	26	7	33	1
End	26	7	33	1
Final voting share	78.8%	21.2%		
Beginning of next congress	28	6	34	0

=== House of Representatives ===
	Party (shading shows control)		Total	Vacant
	Democratic- Republican (DR)	Federalist (F)	Total	Vacant
End of previous congress	102	39	141	1
Begin	113	26	139	3
End	112	28	140	2
Final voting share	80.0%	20.0%		
Beginning of next congress	115	25	140	2

== Leadership ==
=== Senate ===
- President: George Clinton (DR)
- President pro tempore: Samuel Smith (DR)

=== House of Representatives ===
- Speaker: Nathaniel Macon (DR)

== Members ==
This list is arranged by chamber, then by state. Senators are listed by class, and representatives are listed by district.

Skip to House of Representatives, below

=== Senate ===
Senators were elected by the state legislatures every two years, with one-third beginning new six-year terms with each Congress. Preceding the names in the list below are Senate class numbers, which indicate the cycle of their election.

==== Connecticut ====
▌1. James Hillhouse (F)
▌3. Uriah Tracy (F)

==== Delaware ====
▌1. Samuel White (F)
▌2. James A. Bayard (F)

==== Georgia ====
▌2. Abraham Baldwin (DR)
▌3. James Jackson (DR), until March 19, 1806

▌John Milledge (DR), from June 19, 1806

==== Kentucky ====
▌2. Buckner Thruston (DR)
▌3. John Breckinridge (DR), until August 7, 1805

▌John Adair (DR), November 8, 1805 – November 18, 1806
▌Henry Clay (DR), from November 19, 1806

==== Maryland ====
▌1. Samuel Smith (DR)
▌3. Robert Wright (DR), until November 12, 1806

▌Philip Reed (DR), from November 25, 1806

==== Massachusetts ====
▌1. John Quincy Adams (F)
▌2. Timothy Pickering (F)

==== New Hampshire ====
▌2. Nicholas Gilman (DR)
▌3. William Plumer (F)

==== New Jersey ====
▌1. John Condit (DR)
▌2. Aaron Kitchell (DR)

==== New York ====
▌1. Samuel L. Mitchill (DR)
▌3. John Smith (DR)

==== North Carolina ====
▌2. James Turner (DR)
▌3. David Stone (DR), until February 17, 1807

==== Ohio ====
▌1. John Smith (DR)
▌3. Thomas Worthington (DR)

==== Pennsylvania ====
▌1. Samuel Maclay (DR)
▌3. George Logan (DR)

==== Rhode Island ====
▌1. Benjamin Howland (DR)
▌2. James Fenner (DR)

==== South Carolina ====
▌2. Thomas Sumter (DR)
▌3. John Gaillard (DR)

==== Tennessee ====
▌1. Joseph Anderson (DR)
▌2. Daniel Smith (DR)

==== Vermont ====
▌1. Israel Smith (DR)
▌3. Stephen R. Bradley (DR)

==== Virginia ====
▌1. Andrew Moore (DR)
▌2. William B. Giles (DR)

Senators' party membership by state at the opening of the 9th Congress in March 1805. 2 Democratic-Republicans 1 Democratic-Republican and 1 Federalist 2 Federalists

=== House of Representatives ===
The names of representatives are listed by their district numbers

==== Connecticut ====
All representatives were elected statewide on a general ticket.

▌At-large. Samuel W. Dana (F)
▌At-large. John Davenport (F)
▌At-large. Jonathan O. Moseley (F)
▌At-large. Timothy Pitkin (F), seated September 16, 1805
▌At-large. John Cotton Smith (F), until August 1806

▌Theodore Dwight (F), seated December 1, 1806

▌At-large. Lewis B. Sturges (F), seated September 16, 1805
▌At-large. Benjamin Tallmadge (F)

==== Delaware ====
▌At-large. James M. Broom (F)

==== Georgia ====
All representatives were elected statewide on a general ticket.

▌At-large. Joseph Bryan (DR), until 1806

▌Dennis Smelt (DR), from September 1, 1806

▌At-large. Peter Early (DR)
▌At-large. David Meriwether (DR)
▌At-large. Cowles Mead (DR), until December 24, 1805

▌Thomas Spalding (DR), December 24, 1805 – 1806
▌William W. Bibb (DR), from January 26, 1807

==== Kentucky ====
▌1. Matthew Lyon (DR)
▌2. John Boyle (DR)
▌3. Matthew Walton (DR)
▌4. Thomas Sandford (DR)
▌5. John Fowler (DR)
▌6. George M. Bedinger (DR)

==== Maryland ====
The 5th district was a plural district with two representatives.

▌1. John Campbell (F)
▌2. Leonard Covington (DR)
▌3. Patrick Magruder (DR)
▌4. Roger Nelson (DR)
▌5. William McCreery (DR)
▌5. Nicholas R. Moore (DR)
▌6. John Archer (DR)
▌7. Joseph H. Nicholson (DR), until March 1, 1806

▌Edward Lloyd (DR), from December 3, 1806

▌8. Charles Goldsborough (F)

==== Massachusetts ====
▌1. Josiah Quincy (F)
▌2. Jacob Crowninshield (DR)
▌3. Jeremiah Nelson (F)
▌4. Joseph Bradley Varnum (DR)
▌5. William Ely (F)
▌6. Samuel Taggart (F)
▌7. Joseph Barker (DR)
▌8. Isaiah L. Green (DR)
▌9. Phanuel Bishop (DR)
▌10. Seth Hastings (F)
▌11. William Stedman (F)
▌12. Barnabas Bidwell (DR)
▌13. Ebenezer Seaver (DR)
▌14. Richard Cutts (DR)
▌15. Peleg Wadsworth (F)
▌16. Orchard Cook (DR)
▌17. John Chandler (DR)

==== New Hampshire ====
All representatives were elected statewide on a general ticket.

▌At-large. Silas Betton (F)
▌At-large. Caleb Ellis (F)
▌At-large. David Hough (F)
▌At-large. Samuel Tenney (F)
▌At-large. Thomas W. Thompson (F)

==== New Jersey ====
All representatives were elected statewide on a general ticket.

▌At-large. Ezra Darby (DR)
▌At-large. Ebenezer Elmer (DR)
▌At-large. William Helms (DR)
▌At-large. John Lambert (DR)
▌At-large. James Sloan (DR)
▌At-large. Henry Southard (DR)

==== New York ====
▌1. Eliphalet Wickes (DR)
2. and 3. Joint district with two seats.

▌Gurdon S. Mumford (DR)
▌George Clinton Jr. (DR)

▌4. Philip Van Cortlandt (DR)
▌5. John Blake Jr. (DR)
▌6. Daniel C. Verplanck (DR)
▌7. Martin G. Schuneman (DR)
▌8. Henry W. Livingston (F)
▌9. Killian K. Van Rensselaer (F)
▌10. Josiah Masters (DR)
▌11. Peter Sailly (DR)
▌12. David Thomas (DR)
▌13. Thomas Sammons (DR)
▌14. John Russell (DR)
▌15. Nathan Williams (DR)
▌16. Uri Tracy (DR)
▌17. Silas Halsey (DR)

==== North Carolina ====
▌1. Thomas Wynns (DR)
▌2. Willis Alston (DR)
▌3. Thomas Blount (DR)
▌4. William Blackledge (DR)
▌5. Thomas Kenan (DR)
▌6. Nathaniel Macon (DR)
▌7. Duncan McFarlan (DR)
▌8. Richard Stanford (DR)
▌9. Marmaduke Williams (DR)
▌10. Nathaniel Alexander (DR), until November 1805

▌Evan S. Alexander (DR), from February 24, 1806

▌11. James Holland (DR)
▌12. Joseph Winston (DR)

==== Ohio ====
▌At-large. Jeremiah Morrow (DR)

==== Pennsylvania ====
There were four plural districts, the 1st, 2nd and 3rd had three representatives each, the 4th had two representatives.

▌1. Joseph Clay (DR)
▌1. Michael Leib (DR), until February 14, 1806

▌John Porter (DR), from December 8, 1806

▌1. Jacob Richards (DR)
▌2. Robert Brown (DR)
▌2. Frederick Conrad (DR)
▌2. John Pugh (DR)
▌3. Isaac Anderson (DR)
▌3. Christian Lower (DR), until December 19, 1806, vacant thereafter
▌3. John Whitehill (DR)
▌4. David Bard (DR)
▌4. John A. Hanna (DR), until July 23, 1805

▌Robert Whitehill (DR), from November 7, 1805

▌5. Andrew Gregg (DR)
▌6. James Kelly (F)
▌7. John Rea (DR)
▌8. William Findley (DR)
▌9. John Smilie (DR)
▌10. John Hamilton (DR)
▌11. Samuel Smith (DR), seated November 7, 1805

==== Rhode Island ====
Both representatives were elected statewide on a general ticket.

▌At-large. Nehemiah Knight (DR)
▌At-large. Joseph Stanton Jr. (DR)

==== South Carolina ====
▌1. Robert Marion (DR)
▌2. William Butler Sr. (DR)
▌3. David R. Williams (DR)
▌4. O'Brien Smith (DR)
▌5. Richard Winn (DR)
▌6. Levi Casey (DR), until February 3, 1807, vacant thereafter
▌7. Thomas Moore (DR)
▌8. Elias Earle (DR)

==== Tennessee ====
▌1. John Rhea (DR)
▌2. George W. Campbell (DR)
▌3. William Dickson (DR)

==== Vermont ====
▌1. Gideon Olin (DR)
▌2. James Elliott (F)
▌3. James Fisk (DR)
▌4. Martin Chittenden (F)

==== Virginia ====
▌1. John G. Jackson (DR)
▌2. John Morrow (DR)
▌3. John Smith (DR)
▌4. David Holmes (DR)
▌5. Alexander Wilson (DR)
▌6. Abram Trigg (DR)
▌7. Joseph Lewis Jr. (F)
▌8. Walter Jones (DR)
▌9. Philip R. Thompson (DR)
▌10. John Dawson (DR)
▌11. James M. Garnett (DR)
▌12. Burwell Bassett (DR)
▌13. Christopher Clark (DR), until July 1, 1806

▌William A. Burwell (DR), from December 1, 1806

▌14. Matthew Clay (DR)
▌15. John Randolph (DR)
▌16. John W. Eppes (DR)
▌17. John Claiborne (DR)
▌18. Peterson Goodwyn (DR)
▌19. Edwin Gray (DR)
▌20. Thomas Newton Jr. (DR)
▌21. Thomas M. Randolph (DR)
▌22. John Clopton (DR)

==== Non-voting members ====
Indiana Territory. Benjamin Parke, seated December 12, 1805
Mississippi Territory. William Lattimore
Orleans Territory. Daniel Clark, seated December 1, 1806

== Changes in membership ==
The count below reflects changes from the beginning of this Congress.

=== Senate ===
Senate changes
State (class)	Vacated by	Reason for change	Successor	Date of successor's formal installation (Note: When seated or oath administered, not necessarily when service began.)
North Carolina (2)	Vacant	Montfort Stokes (DR) was elected in 1804 but declined the position. Successor elected December 22, 1805.	James Turner (DR)	Seated December 22, 1805
Kentucky (3)	John Breckinridge (DR)	Resigned August 7, 1805, after being appointed United States Attorney General. Successor elected November 8, 1805, to finish the term ending March 4, 1807.	John Adair (DR)	Seated November 8, 1805
Georgia (3)	James Jackson (DR)	Died March 19, 1806. Winner elected June 19, 1806, to finish the term ending March 4, 1807.	John Milledge (DR)	Seated June 19, 1806
Maryland (3)	Robert Wright (DR)	Resigned November 12, 1806, after being elected Governor of Maryland. Successor elected November 25, 1806, to finish the term ending March 4, 1807 (as well as to the next term).	Philip Reed (DR)	Seated November 25, 1806
Kentucky (3)	John Adair (DR)	Resigned November 18, 1806, after losing the election to the next term. Successor elected November 19, 1806, despite being younger than the constitutional age minimum.	Henry Clay (DR)	Seated November 19, 1806
North Carolina (3)	David Stone (DR)	Resigned February 17, 1807. Vacant for remainder of Congress.	Vacant	

=== House of Representatives ===
House changes
District	Vacated by	Reason for change	Successor	Date of successor's formal installation
Connecticut at-large	Vacant	Calvin Goddard (F) resigned before the beginning of this Congress	Timothy Pitkin (F)	Seated September 16, 1805
Connecticut at-large	Vacant	Roger Griswold (F) resigned before the beginning of this Congress	Lewis B. Sturges (F)	Seated September 16, 1805
Pennsylvania; 11th	Vacant	John B. C. Lucas (DR) resigned before the beginning of this Congress	Samuel Smith (DR)	Seated November 7, 1805
Pennsylvania; 4th	John A. Hanna (DR)	Died July 23, 1805	Robert Whitehill (DR)	Seated November 7, 1805
North Carolina; 10th	Nathaniel Alexander (DR)	Resigned November, 1805 after being elected Governor of North Carolina	Evan S. Alexander (DR)	Seated February 24, 1806
Indiana Territory	Vacant	Territory elected delegate to Congress for first time	Benjamin Parke	Elected December 12, 1805
Georgia at-large	Cowles Mead (DR)	Lost contested election December 24, 1805	Thomas Spalding (DR)	Seated December 24, 1805
Georgia at-large	Joseph Bryan (DR)	Resigned sometime in 1806	Dennis Smelt (DR)	September 1, 1806
Georgia at-large	Thomas Spalding (DR)	Resigned sometime in 1806	William W. Bibb (DR)	Seated January 26, 1807
Pennsylvania; 1st	Michael Leib (DR)	Resigned February 14, 1806	John Porter (DR)	Seated December 8, 1806
Maryland; 7th	Joseph H. Nicholson (DR)	Resigned March 1, 1806	Edward Lloyd (DR)	Seated December 3, 1806
Virginia; 13th	Christopher H. Clark (DR)	Resigned July 1, 1806	William A. Burwell (DR)	December 1, 1806
Connecticut at-large	John Cotton Smith (F)	Resigned sometime in August, 1806	Theodore Dwight (F)	December 1, 1806
Territory of Orleans	Vacant	Territory elected delegate to Congress for first time	Daniel Clark	Elected December 1, 1806
Pennsylvania; 3rd	Christian Lower (DR)	Resigned December 19, 1806	Vacant	Not filled for remainder of term
South Carolina; 6th	Levi Casey (DR)	Died February 3, 1807	Vacant	Not filled for remainder of term

== Committees ==
Lists of committees and their party leaders.

=== Senate ===
- Army Regulations (Select)
- Whole

=== House of Representatives ===
- Accounts (Chairman: Frederick Conrad)
- Claims (Chairman: John Cotton Smith then David Holmes)
- Commerce and Manufactures (Chairman: Jacob Crowninshield)
- Elections (Chairman: William Findley)
- Public Lands (Chairman: Andrew Gregg then John Boyle then Andrew Gregg)
- Revisal and Unfinished Business (Chairman: Samuel Tenney)
- Rules (Select)
- Standards of Official Conduct
- Ways and Means (Chairman: John Randolph then Joseph Clay)
- Whole

=== Joint committees ===
- Enrolled Bills (Chairman: N/A then Sen. James Turner)
- The Library (Chairman: N/A)

== Employees ==
=== Legislative branch agency directors ===
- Architect of the Capitol: Benjamin Latrobe
- Librarian of Congress: John J. Beckley

=== Senate ===
- Chaplain: Alexander T. McCormick, Episcopalian, elected November 7, 1804
  - Edward Gantt, Episcopalian, elected December 4, 1805
  - John J. Sayrs, Episcopalian, elected December 3, 1806
- Secretary: Samuel A. Otis
- Sergeant at Arms: James Mathers

=== House of Representatives ===
- Chaplain: James Laurie, Presbyterian, elected December 2, 1805
  - Robert Elliot, Presbyterian, elected December 1, 1806
- Clerk: John Beckley
- Doorkeeper: Thomas Claxton
- Sergeant at Arms: Joseph Wheaton

== See also ==
- 1804 United States elections (elections leading to this Congress)
  - 1804 United States presidential election
  - 1804–05 United States Senate elections
  - 1804–05 United States House of Representatives elections
- 1806 United States elections (elections during this Congress, leading to the next Congress)
  - 1806–07 United States Senate elections
  - 1806–07 United States House of Representatives elections
