= 1801 Georgia's at-large congressional district special election =

A special election was held in Georgia's at-large congressional district on March 23, 1801, to fill a vacancy left by the death of James Jones on January 11, 1801, before the start of the 7th Congress. His death had also left a vacancy in the 6th Congress, which went unfilled.

== Election results ==
Candidate	Party	Votes	Percent
John Milledge	Democratic-Republican	2,644	67.3%
William Smith	Unknown	630	16.0%
Peter Van Allen	Unknown	494	12.6%
George Jones	Democratic-Republican	163	4.2%

Milledge took his seat at the start of the 1st session of the 7th Congress, on December 7, 1801. Milledge had served earlier, in the 4th and 5th Congresses. Milledge himself would subsequently resign in May, 1802, upon being elected Governor of Georgia

== See also ==
- List of special elections to the United States House of Representatives
