= 1812 Georgia's at-large congressional district special election =

A special election was held in Georgia's at-large congressional district on October 5, 1812 to fill a vacancy left by the resignation of Howell Cobb (DR) to accept a commission as an army captain in the War of 1812 earlier that year.

== Election results ==
Candidate	Party	Votes	Percent
William Barnett	Democratic-Republican	5,428	39.0%
John Forsyth	Democratic-Republican	5,344	38.2%
Thomas Telfair	Democratic-Republican	2,606	18.6%
Thomas Carr		595	4.3%
George Dent	Federalist?	3	.02%

Barnett took his seat November 27, 1812

== See also ==
- List of special elections to the United States House of Representatives
