= Georgia's at-large congressional district =

Former congressional district

Coordinates: 33°N 83°W

- Obsolete district
- Created: 1790; 1829; 1880
- Eliminated: 1820; 1845; 1885
- Years active: 1793–1827; 1829–1845; 1883–1885

From 1793 to 1827 and again from 1829 to 1845, Georgia elected all its Representatives in Congress from a single multi-member at-large congressional district:

- From 1793 to 1803, Georgia elected 2 Representatives at large.
- From 1803 to 1813 Georgia elected 4 Representatives at large.
- From 1813 to 1823 Georgia elected 6 Representatives at large.
- From 1823 to 1826 and again from 1829 to 1833 Georgia elected 7 Representatives at large.
- From 1833 to 1843 Georgia elected 9 Representatives at large.
- From 1843 to 1845 Georgia elected 8 Representatives at large.

Briefly, from 1883 to 1885, Georgia elected one of its representatives at large, with the remainder being elected from districts.

== List of members representing the district ==
The at-large district was created in 1793 from district representation.

	Seat A	Seat B	Seat C	Seat D	Seat E	Seat F	Seat G	Seat H	Seat I
3rd (1793–1795)	Abraham Baldwin (AA-Savannah) Redistricted from the 2nd district and re-elected in 1792. ↓	Thomas P. Carnes (AA-Athens) Elected in 1792. Lost re-election.							
4th (1795–1797)	Abraham Baldwin (DR-Savannah) Re-elected in 1794. Re-elected in 1796. Lost re-election.	John Milledge (DR-Augusta) Elected in 1794. Re-elected in 1796. Retired.							
5th (1797–1799)	Abraham Baldwin (DR-Savannah) Re-elected in 1794. Re-elected in 1796. Lost re-election.	John Milledge (DR-Augusta) Elected in 1794. Re-elected in 1796. Retired.							
6th (1799–1801)	Benjamin Taliaferro (F-Wilkes County) Elected in 1798. ↓	James Jones (F-Savannah) Elected in 1798. Re-elected in 1800, but died January 11, 1801.							
6th (1799–1801)	Benjamin Taliaferro (F-Wilkes County) Elected in 1798. ↓	Vacant							
7th (1801–1803)	Benjamin Taliaferro (DR-Wilkes County) Re-elected in 1800. Resigned in 1802.	Vacant							
7th (1801–1803)	Benjamin Taliaferro (DR-Wilkes County) Re-elected in 1800. Resigned in 1802.	John Milledge (DR-Augusta) Elected March 23, 1801, to finish Jones's term and seated December 7, 1801. Re-elected in 1802, but declined to serve to become Governor of Georgia. Resigned in May 1802.							
7th (1801–1803)	Vacant	Vacant							
7th (1801–1803)	David Meriwether (DR-Clarke County) Elected April 26, 1802, to finish Taliaferro's term and seated December 6, 1802. Also elected in 1802 to the next term. Re-elected in 1804. Retired.	Peter Early (DR-Washington) Elected December 15, 1802, to finish Milledge's term in the 7th Congress and seated January 10, 1803. Also elected to the next term in 1802. Re-elected in 1804. Retired.							
8th (1803–1805)	David Meriwether (DR-Clarke County) Elected April 26, 1802, to finish Taliaferro's term and seated December 6, 1802. Also elected in 1802 to the next term. Re-elected in 1804. Retired.	Peter Early (DR-Washington) Elected December 15, 1802, to finish Milledge's term in the 7th Congress and seated January 10, 1803. Also elected to the next term in 1802. Re-elected in 1804. Retired.	Vacant	Samuel Hammond (DR-Savannah) Elected in 1802. Retired.					
8th (1803–1805)	David Meriwether (DR-Clarke County) Elected April 26, 1802, to finish Taliaferro's term and seated December 6, 1802. Also elected in 1802 to the next term. Re-elected in 1804. Retired.	Peter Early (DR-Washington) Elected December 15, 1802, to finish Milledge's term in the 7th Congress and seated January 10, 1803. Also elected to the next term in 1802. Re-elected in 1804. Retired.	Joseph Bryan (DR-Wilmington Island) Elected October 3, 1803, to finish Milledge's term in the 8th Congress and seated October 17, 1803. Re-elected in 1804. Resigned.	Samuel Hammond (DR-Savannah) Elected in 1802. Retired.					
9th (1805–1807)	David Meriwether (DR-Clarke County) Elected April 26, 1802, to finish Taliaferro's term and seated December 6, 1802. Also elected in 1802 to the next term. Re-elected in 1804. Retired.	Peter Early (DR-Washington) Elected December 15, 1802, to finish Milledge's term in the 7th Congress and seated January 10, 1803. Also elected to the next term in 1802. Re-elected in 1804. Retired.	Joseph Bryan (DR-Wilmington Island) Elected October 3, 1803, to finish Milledge's term in the 8th Congress and seated October 17, 1803. Re-elected in 1804. Resigned.	Cowles Mead (DR) Elected in 1804. Lost election contest on December 24, 1805.					
9th (1805–1807)	David Meriwether (DR-Clarke County) Elected April 26, 1802, to finish Taliaferro's term and seated December 6, 1802. Also elected in 1802 to the next term. Re-elected in 1804. Retired.	Peter Early (DR-Washington) Elected December 15, 1802, to finish Milledge's term in the 7th Congress and seated January 10, 1803. Also elected to the next term in 1802. Re-elected in 1804. Retired.	Dennis Smelt (DR-Savannah) Elected September 15, 1806, to finish Bryan's term and seated December 26, 1806. Re-elected in 1806. Re-elected in 1808. Retired.	Thomas Spalding (DR-Glynn County) Won election contest on December 24, 1805. Lost re-election and then resigned.					
9th (1805–1807)	David Meriwether (DR-Clarke County) Elected April 26, 1802, to finish Taliaferro's term and seated December 6, 1802. Also elected in 1802 to the next term. Re-elected in 1804. Retired.	Peter Early (DR-Washington) Elected December 15, 1802, to finish Milledge's term in the 7th Congress and seated January 10, 1803. Also elected to the next term in 1802. Re-elected in 1804. Retired.	Dennis Smelt (DR-Savannah) Elected September 15, 1806, to finish Bryan's term and seated December 26, 1806. Re-elected in 1806. Re-elected in 1808. Retired.	Vacant					
9th (1805–1807)	David Meriwether (DR-Clarke County) Elected April 26, 1802, to finish Taliaferro's term and seated December 6, 1802. Also elected in 1802 to the next term. Re-elected in 1804. Retired.	Peter Early (DR-Washington) Elected December 15, 1802, to finish Milledge's term in the 7th Congress and seated January 10, 1803. Also elected to the next term in 1802. Re-elected in 1804. Retired.	Dennis Smelt (DR-Savannah) Elected September 15, 1806, to finish Bryan's term and seated December 26, 1806. Re-elected in 1806. Re-elected in 1808. Retired.	William Wyatt Bibb (DR-Petersburg) Elected in 1806. Elected early to finish Spalding's term and seated January 26, 1807. Re-elected in 1808. Re-elected in 1810. Re-elected in 1812.					
10th (1807–1809)	Howell Cobb (DR-Louisville) Elected in 1806. Re-elected in 1808. Re-elected in 1810. Resigned.	George M. Troup (DR-Dublin) Elected in 1806. Re-elected in 1808. Re-elected in 1810. Re-elected in 1812. Retired.	Dennis Smelt (DR-Savannah) Elected September 15, 1806, to finish Bryan's term and seated December 26, 1806. Re-elected in 1806. Re-elected in 1808. Retired.	William Wyatt Bibb (DR-Petersburg) Elected in 1806. Elected early to finish Spalding's term and seated January 26, 1807. Re-elected in 1808. Re-elected in 1810. Re-elected in 1812.					
11th (1809–1811)	Howell Cobb (DR-Louisville) Elected in 1806. Re-elected in 1808. Re-elected in 1810. Resigned.	George M. Troup (DR-Dublin) Elected in 1806. Re-elected in 1808. Re-elected in 1810. Re-elected in 1812. Retired.	Dennis Smelt (DR-Savannah) Elected September 15, 1806, to finish Bryan's term and seated December 26, 1806. Re-elected in 1806. Re-elected in 1808. Retired.	William Wyatt Bibb (DR-Petersburg) Elected in 1806. Elected early to finish Spalding's term and seated January 26, 1807. Re-elected in 1808. Re-elected in 1810. Re-elected in 1812.					
12th (1811–1813)	Howell Cobb (DR-Louisville) Elected in 1806. Re-elected in 1808. Re-elected in 1810. Resigned.	George M. Troup (DR-Dublin) Elected in 1806. Re-elected in 1808. Re-elected in 1810. Re-elected in 1812. Retired.	Bolling Hall (DR-Milledgeville) Elected in 1810. Re-elected in 1812. Re-elected in 1814. Retired.	William Wyatt Bibb (DR-Petersburg) Elected in 1806. Elected early to finish Spalding's term and seated January 26, 1807. Re-elected in 1808. Re-elected in 1810. Re-elected in 1812.					
12th (1811–1813)	Vacant	George M. Troup (DR-Dublin) Elected in 1806. Re-elected in 1808. Re-elected in 1810. Re-elected in 1812. Retired.	Bolling Hall (DR-Milledgeville) Elected in 1810. Re-elected in 1812. Re-elected in 1814. Retired.	William Wyatt Bibb (DR-Petersburg) Elected in 1806. Elected early to finish Spalding's term and seated January 26, 1807. Re-elected in 1808. Re-elected in 1810. Re-elected in 1812.					
12th (1811–1813)	William Barnett (DR-Washington) Elected to finish Cobb's term. Also elected to the next term in 1812. Lost re-election.	George M. Troup (DR-Dublin) Elected in 1806. Re-elected in 1808. Re-elected in 1810. Re-elected in 1812. Retired.	Bolling Hall (DR-Milledgeville) Elected in 1810. Re-elected in 1812. Re-elected in 1814. Retired.	William Wyatt Bibb (DR-Petersburg) Elected in 1806. Elected early to finish Spalding's term and seated January 26, 1807. Re-elected in 1808. Re-elected in 1810. Re-elected in 1812.					
13th (1813–1815)	William Barnett (DR-Washington) Elected to finish Cobb's term. Also elected to the next term in 1812. Lost re-election.	George M. Troup (DR-Dublin) Elected in 1806. Re-elected in 1808. Re-elected in 1810. Re-elected in 1812. Retired.	Bolling Hall (DR-Milledgeville) Elected in 1810. Re-elected in 1812. Re-elected in 1814. Retired.	William Wyatt Bibb (DR-Petersburg) Elected in 1806. Elected early to finish Spalding's term and seated January 26, 1807. Re-elected in 1808. Re-elected in 1810. Re-elected in 1812.	John Forsyth (DR-Augusta) Elected in 1812. Re-elected in 1814. Re-elected in 1816. Re-elected in 1818, but declinced the seat and resigned November 23, 1818. [data missing]	Thomas Telfair (DR-Savannah) Elected in 1812. Re-elected in 1814. Lost re-election.			
13th (1813–1815)	William Barnett (DR-Washington) Elected to finish Cobb's term. Also elected to the next term in 1812. Lost re-election.	George M. Troup (DR-Dublin) Elected in 1806. Re-elected in 1808. Re-elected in 1810. Re-elected in 1812. Retired.	Bolling Hall (DR-Milledgeville) Elected in 1810. Re-elected in 1812. Re-elected in 1814. Retired.	Alfred Cuthbert (DR-Eaton) Elected to finish Bibb's term. Re-elected in 1814. Resigned.	John Forsyth (DR-Augusta) Elected in 1812. Re-elected in 1814. Re-elected in 1816. Re-elected in 1818, but declinced the seat and resigned November 23, 1818. [data missing]	Thomas Telfair (DR-Savannah) Elected in 1812. Re-elected in 1814. Lost re-election.			
14th (1815–1817)	Richard Henry Wilde (DR-Augusta) Elected in 1814. Lost re-election.	Wilson Lumpkin (DR-Lexington) Elected in 1814. Lost re-election.	Bolling Hall (DR-Milledgeville) Elected in 1810. Re-elected in 1812. Re-elected in 1814. Retired.	Alfred Cuthbert (DR-Eaton) Elected to finish Bibb's term. Re-elected in 1814. Resigned.	John Forsyth (DR-Augusta) Elected in 1812. Re-elected in 1814. Re-elected in 1816. Re-elected in 1818, but declinced the seat and resigned November 23, 1818. [data missing]	Thomas Telfair (DR-Savannah) Elected in 1812. Re-elected in 1814. Lost re-election.			
14th (1815–1817)	Richard Henry Wilde (DR-Augusta) Elected in 1814. Lost re-election.	Wilson Lumpkin (DR-Lexington) Elected in 1814. Lost re-election.	Bolling Hall (DR-Milledgeville) Elected in 1810. Re-elected in 1812. Re-elected in 1814. Retired.	Zadock Cook (DR-Watkinsville) Elected in 1816. Also elected to finish Cuthbert's term. Retired.	John Forsyth (DR-Augusta) Elected in 1812. Re-elected in 1814. Re-elected in 1816. Re-elected in 1818, but declinced the seat and resigned November 23, 1818. [data missing]	Thomas Telfair (DR-Savannah) Elected in 1812. Re-elected in 1814. Lost re-election.			
15th (1817–1819)	Thomas W. Cobb (DR-Lexington) Elected in 1816. Re-elected in 1818. Retired.	Joel Crawford (DR-Milledgeville) Elected in 1816. Re-elected in 1818. Retired.	Joel Abbot (DR-Washington) (Note: Supported the Crawford faction in the 1824 United States presidential election.) Elected in 1816. Re-elected in 1818. Re-elected in 1820. Re-elected in 1822. Retired.	Zadock Cook (DR-Watkinsville) Elected in 1816. Also elected to finish Cuthbert's term. Retired.	John Forsyth (DR-Augusta) Elected in 1812. Re-elected in 1814. Re-elected in 1816. Re-elected in 1818, but declinced the seat and resigned November 23, 1818. [data missing]	William Terrell (DR-Sparta) Elected in 1816. Re-elected in 1818. Retired.			
15th (1817–1819)	Thomas W. Cobb (DR-Lexington) Elected in 1816. Re-elected in 1818. Retired.	Joel Crawford (DR-Milledgeville) Elected in 1816. Re-elected in 1818. Retired.	Joel Abbot (DR-Washington) Elected in 1816. Re-elected in 1818. Re-elected in 1820. Re-elected in 1822. Retired.	Zadock Cook (DR-Watkinsville) Elected in 1816. Also elected to finish Cuthbert's term. Retired.	Robert R. Reid (DR-Augusta) Elected January 4, 1819, to finish Forsyth's term and seated February 18, 1819. Also elected to the next term. Re-elected in 1820. Retired.	William Terrell (DR-Sparta) Elected in 1816. Re-elected in 1818. Retired.			
16th (1819–1821)	Thomas W. Cobb (DR-Lexington) Elected in 1816. Re-elected in 1818. Retired.	Joel Crawford (DR-Milledgeville) Elected in 1816. Re-elected in 1818. Retired.	Joel Abbot (DR-Washington) Elected in 1816. Re-elected in 1818. Re-elected in 1820. Re-elected in 1822. Retired.	John Alfred Cuthbert (DR-Eatonton) Elected in 1818. Retired.	Robert R. Reid (DR-Augusta) Elected January 4, 1819, to finish Forsyth's term and seated February 18, 1819. Also elected to the next term. Re-elected in 1820. Retired.	William Terrell (DR-Sparta) Elected in 1816. Re-elected in 1818. Retired.			
17th (1821–1823)	George R. Gilmer (DR-Elberton) Elected in 1820. Retired.	Edward F. Tattnall (DR-Savannah) Elected in 1820. Re-elected in 1822. ↓	Joel Abbot (DR-Washington) Elected in 1816. Re-elected in 1818. Re-elected in 1820. Re-elected in 1822. Retired.	Alfred Cuthbert (DR-Eatonton) Elected in 1820. Re-elected in 1822. ↓	Robert R. Reid (DR-Augusta) Elected January 4, 1819, to finish Forsyth's term and seated February 18, 1819. Also elected to the next term. Re-elected in 1820. Retired.	Wiley Thompson (DR-Elberton) Elected in 1820. Re-elected in 1822. ↓			
18th (1823–1825)	Thomas W. Cobb (DR-Greensboro) Elected in 1822. Lost re-election. Resigned December 6, 1824, when elected U.S. Senator.	Edward F. Tattnall (DR-Savannah) Elected in 1820. Re-elected in 1822. ↓	Joel Abbot (DR-Washington) Elected in 1816. Re-elected in 1818. Re-elected in 1820. Re-elected in 1822. Retired.	Alfred Cuthbert (DR-Eatonton) Elected in 1820. Re-elected in 1822. ↓	John Forsyth (DR-Augusta) Elected in 1822. ↓	Wiley Thompson (DR-Elberton) Elected in 1820. Re-elected in 1822. ↓	George Cary (DR-Appling) Elected in 1822. ↓		
18th (1823–1825)	Richard Henry Wilde (DR-Augusta) Elected in December 1824 to finish Cobb's term. Seated February 7, 1825. Retired.	Edward F. Tattnall (DR-Savannah) Elected in 1820. Re-elected in 1822. ↓	Joel Abbot (DR-Washington) Elected in 1816. Re-elected in 1818. Re-elected in 1820. Re-elected in 1822. Retired.	Alfred Cuthbert (DR-Eatonton) Elected in 1820. Re-elected in 1822. ↓	John Forsyth (DR-Augusta) Elected in 1822. ↓	Wiley Thompson (DR-Elberton) Elected in 1820. Re-elected in 1822. ↓	George Cary (DR-Appling) Elected in 1822. ↓		
19th (1825–1827)	Charles E. Haynes (J-Sparta) Elected in 1824. Redistricted to the 5th district.	Edward F. Tattnall (J-Savannah) Re-elected in 1824. Redistricted to the 1st district.	James Meriwether (J-Athens) Elected in 1824. Redistricted to the 4th district and retired.	Alfred Cuthbert (J-Eatonton) Re-elected in 1824. Redistricted to the 6th district but lost re-election.	John Forsyth (J-Augusta) Re-elected in 1824. Redistricted to the 2nd district.	Wiley Thompson (J-Elberton) Re-elected in 1824. Redistricted to the 3rd district.	George Cary (J-Appling) Re-elected in 1824. Redistricted to the 2nd district and retired.		
20th (1827–1829)	District returned to district representation in 1827. District re-established from district representation in 1829.								
21st (1829–1831)	Charles E. Haynes (J-Sparta) Redistricted from the 5th district and re-elected in 1828. Lost re-election.	Wilson Lumpkin (J-Monroe) Redistricted from the 4th district and re-elected in 1828. Re-elected in 1830. Resigned in 1831 to become Governor of Georgia.	Vacant (Note: George Gilmer (Jacksonian) was redistricted from the 1st district and re-elected but failed to accept the position within the legal time frame and the governor ordered a new election.)	Richard Henry Wilde (J-Augusta) Redistricted from the 2nd district and re-elected in 1828. Re-elected in 1830. Re-elected in 1832. Lost re-election.	James M. Wayne (J-Savannah) Elected in 1828. Re-elected in 1830. Re-elected in 1832. Re-elected in 1834 but declined the seat. Resigned January 13, 1835, to become Associate Justice of the U.S. Supreme Court.	Wiley Thompson (J-Elberton) Redistricted from the 3rd district and Re-elected in 1828. Re-elected in 1830. Retired.	Thomas F. Foster (J-Greensboro) Elected in 1828. Re-elected in 1830. Re-elected in 1832. Lost re-election.		
21st (1829–1831)	Charles E. Haynes (J-Sparta) Redistricted from the 5th district and re-elected in 1828. Lost re-election.	Wilson Lumpkin (J-Monroe) Redistricted from the 4th district and re-elected in 1828. Re-elected in 1830. Resigned in 1831 to become Governor of Georgia.	Henry G. Lamar (J-Macon) Elected to finish the vacant term. Re-elected in 1830. Lost re-election.	Richard Henry Wilde (J-Augusta) Redistricted from the 2nd district and re-elected in 1828. Re-elected in 1830. Re-elected in 1832. Lost re-election.	James M. Wayne (J-Savannah) Elected in 1828. Re-elected in 1830. Re-elected in 1832. Re-elected in 1834 but declined the seat. Resigned January 13, 1835, to become Associate Justice of the U.S. Supreme Court.	Wiley Thompson (J-Elberton) Redistricted from the 3rd district and Re-elected in 1828. Re-elected in 1830. Retired.	Thomas F. Foster (J-Greensboro) Elected in 1828. Re-elected in 1830. Re-elected in 1832. Lost re-election.		
22nd (1831–1833)	Daniel Newnan (J-Macon) Elected in 1830. Lost re-election.	Wilson Lumpkin (J-Monroe) Redistricted from the 4th district and re-elected in 1828. Re-elected in 1830. Resigned in 1831 to become Governor of Georgia.	Henry G. Lamar (J-Macon) Elected to finish the vacant term. Re-elected in 1830. Lost re-election.	Richard Henry Wilde (J-Augusta) Redistricted from the 2nd district and re-elected in 1828. Re-elected in 1830. Re-elected in 1832. Lost re-election.	James M. Wayne (J-Savannah) Elected in 1828. Re-elected in 1830. Re-elected in 1832. Re-elected in 1834 but declined the seat. Resigned January 13, 1835, to become Associate Justice of the U.S. Supreme Court.	Wiley Thompson (J-Elberton) Redistricted from the 3rd district and Re-elected in 1828. Re-elected in 1830. Retired.	Thomas F. Foster (J-Greensboro) Elected in 1828. Re-elected in 1830. Re-elected in 1832. Lost re-election.		
22nd (1831–1833)	Daniel Newnan (J-Macon) Elected in 1830. Lost re-election.	Augustin S. Clayton (J-Athens) Elected December 12, 1831, to finish Lumpkin's term and seated January 21, 1832. Re-elected in 1832. Retired.	Henry G. Lamar (J-Macon) Elected to finish the vacant term. Re-elected in 1830. Lost re-election.	Richard Henry Wilde (J-Augusta) Redistricted from the 2nd district and re-elected in 1828. Re-elected in 1830. Re-elected in 1832. Lost re-election.	James M. Wayne (J-Savannah) Elected in 1828. Re-elected in 1830. Re-elected in 1832. Re-elected in 1834 but declined the seat. Resigned January 13, 1835, to become Associate Justice of the U.S. Supreme Court.	Wiley Thompson (J-Elberton) Redistricted from the 3rd district and Re-elected in 1828. Re-elected in 1830. Retired.	Thomas F. Foster (J-Greensboro) Elected in 1828. Re-elected in 1830. Re-elected in 1832. Lost re-election.		
23rd (1833–1835)	John E. Coffee (J-Jacksonville) Elected in 1832. Re-elected in 1834. Died September 25, 1836.	Augustin S. Clayton (J-Athens) Elected December 12, 1831, to finish Lumpkin's term and seated January 21, 1832. Re-elected in 1832. Retired.	George R. Gilmer (J-Lexington) Elected in 1832. Lost re-election.	Richard Henry Wilde (J-Augusta) Redistricted from the 2nd district and re-elected in 1828. Re-elected in 1830. Re-elected in 1832. Lost re-election.	James M. Wayne (J-Savannah) Elected in 1828. Re-elected in 1830. Re-elected in 1832. Re-elected in 1834 but declined the seat. Resigned January 13, 1835, to become Associate Justice of the U.S. Supreme Court.	Roger L. Gamble (J-Louisville) Elected in 1832. Lost re-election.	Thomas F. Foster (J-Greensboro) Elected in 1828. Re-elected in 1830. Re-elected in 1832. Lost re-election.	William Schley (J-Augusta) Elected in 1832. Re-elected in 1834. Resigned July 1, 1835.	Seaborn Jones (J-Columbus) Elected in 1832. Retired.
24th (1835–1837)	John E. Coffee (J-Jacksonville) Elected in 1832. Re-elected in 1834. Died September 25, 1836.	George W. Owens (J-Savannah) Elected in 1834. ↓	Seaton Grantland (J-Milledgeville) Elected in 1834. ↓	John W. A. Sanford (J-Milledgeville) Elected in 1834. Resigned July 25, 1835.	Vacant	James C. Terrell (J-Carnesville) Elected in 1834. Resigned July 8, 1835.	George Towns (J-Talbotton) Elected in 1834. Resigned September 1, 1836.	William Schley (J-Augusta) Elected in 1832. Re-elected in 1834. Resigned July 1, 1835.	Charles E. Haynes (J-Sparta) Elected in 1834. ↓
24th (1835–1837)	William C. Dawson (N-Greensboro) Elected October 30, 1836, to finish Coffee's term and seated December 26, 1836. ↓	George W. Owens (J-Savannah) Elected in 1834. ↓	Seaton Grantland (J-Milledgeville) Elected in 1834. ↓	Thomas Glascock (J-Augusta) Elected October 5, 1835, to finish Sanford's term and seated December 7, 1835. ↓	Jabez Y. Jackson (J-Clarkesville) Elected October 5, 1835, to finish Wayne's term and seated December 7, 1835. ↓	Hopkins Holsey (J-Hamilton) Elected October 5, 1835, to finish Terrell's term and seated December 7, 1835. ↓	Julius Caesar Alford (AJ-LaGrange) Elected January 2, 1837, to finish Towns's term and seated January 31, 1837, having already lost election to the next term.	Jesse F. Cleveland (J-Decatur) Elected October 5, 1835, to finish Schley's term and seated December 7, 1835. ↓	Charles E. Haynes (J-Sparta) Elected in 1834. ↓
25th (1837–1839)	William C. Dawson (W-Greensboro) Re-elected in 1836. Re-elected in 1838. Re-elected in 1840. Resigned to run for Governor of Georgia.	George W. Owens (D-Savannah) Re-elected in 1836. [data missing]	Seaton Grantland (D-Milledgeville) Re-elected in 1836. [data missing]	Thomas Glascock (D-Augusta) Re-elected in 1836. [data missing]	Jabez Y. Jackson (D-Clarkesville) Re-elected in 1836. [data missing]	Hopkins Holsey (D-Hamilton) Re-elected in 1836. [data missing]	George Towns (D-Talbotton) [data missing]	Jesse F. Cleveland (D-Decatur) Re-elected in 1836. [data missing]	Charles E. Haynes (D-Sparta) Re-elected in 1836. [data missing]
26th (1839–1841)	William C. Dawson (W-Greensboro) Re-elected in 1836. Re-elected in 1838. Re-elected in 1840. Resigned to run for Governor of Georgia.	Mark A. Cooper (W-Columbus) Elected in 1838. Lost re-election.	Thomas B. King (W-Waynesville) Elected in 1838. Re-elected in 1840. Lost re-election.	Walter T. Colquitt (W-Columbus) Elected in 1838. Resigned July 21, 1840.	Edward J. Black (W-Jacksonboro) Elected in 1838. Lost re-election.	Richard W. Habersham (W-Clarkesville) Elected in 1838. Re-elected in 1840. Died December 2, 1842.	Julius Caesar Alford (W-LaGrange) Elected in 1838. Re-elected in 1840. Resigned in 1841.	Eugenius A. Nisbet (W-Macon) Elected in 1838. Re-elected in 1840. Resigned in 1841.	Lott Warren (W-Palmyra) Elected in 1838. Re-elected in 1840. Retired.
26th (1839–1841)	William C. Dawson (W-Greensboro) Re-elected in 1836. Re-elected in 1838. Re-elected in 1840. Resigned to run for Governor of Georgia.	Mark A. Cooper (W-Columbus) Elected in 1838. Lost re-election.	Thomas B. King (W-Waynesville) Elected in 1838. Re-elected in 1840. Lost re-election.	Hines Holt (W-Columbus) Elected in January 1841 to finish Colquitt's term. [data missing]	Edward J. Black (W-Jacksonboro) Elected in 1838. Lost re-election.	Richard W. Habersham (W-Clarkesville) Elected in 1838. Re-elected in 1840. Died December 2, 1842.	Julius Caesar Alford (W-LaGrange) Elected in 1838. Re-elected in 1840. Resigned in 1841.	Eugenius A. Nisbet (W-Macon) Elected in 1838. Re-elected in 1840. Resigned in 1841.	Lott Warren (W-Palmyra) Elected in 1838. Re-elected in 1840. Retired.
27th (1841–1843)	William C. Dawson (W-Greensboro) Re-elected in 1836. Re-elected in 1838. Re-elected in 1840. Resigned to run for Governor of Georgia.	Thomas F. Foster (W-Columbus) Elected in 1840. Retired.	Thomas B. King (W-Waynesville) Elected in 1838. Re-elected in 1840. Lost re-election.	Roger L. Gamble (W-Louisville) Elected in 1840. Lost re-election.	James A. Meriwether (W-Edenton) Elected in 1840. Retired.	Richard W. Habersham (W-Clarkesville) Elected in 1838. Re-elected in 1840. Died December 2, 1842.	Julius Caesar Alford (W-LaGrange) Elected in 1838. Re-elected in 1840. Resigned in 1841.	Eugenius A. Nisbet (W-Macon) Elected in 1838. Re-elected in 1840. Resigned in 1841.	Lott Warren (W-Palmyra) Elected in 1838. Re-elected in 1840. Retired.
27th (1841–1843)	Mark A. Cooper (D-Columbus) Elected in December 1841 to finish Dawson's term. Re-elected in 1842. Resigned to run for Governor of Georgia.	Thomas F. Foster (W-Columbus) Elected in 1840. Retired.	Thomas B. King (W-Waynesville) Elected in 1838. Re-elected in 1840. Lost re-election.	Roger L. Gamble (W-Louisville) Elected in 1840. Lost re-election.	James A. Meriwether (W-Edenton) Elected in 1840. Retired.	Richard W. Habersham (W-Clarkesville) Elected in 1838. Re-elected in 1840. Died December 2, 1842.	Edward J. Black (D-Jacksonboro) Elected in December 1841 to finish Alford's term. Re-elected in 1842. Lost re-election.	Walter T. Colquitt (D-Columbus) Elected in December 1841 to finish Nisbet's term. Retired.	Lott Warren (W-Palmyra) Elected in 1838. Re-elected in 1840. Retired.
27th (1841–1843)	Mark A. Cooper (D-Columbus) Elected in December 1841 to finish Dawson's term. Re-elected in 1842. Resigned to run for Governor of Georgia.	Thomas F. Foster (W-Columbus) Elected in 1840. Retired.	Thomas B. King (W-Waynesville) Elected in 1838. Re-elected in 1840. Lost re-election.	Roger L. Gamble (W-Louisville) Elected in 1840. Lost re-election.	James A. Meriwether (W-Edenton) Elected in 1840. Retired.	George W. Crawford (W-Augusta) Elected in January 1843 to finish Habersham's term. [data missing]	Edward J. Black (D-Jacksonboro) Elected in December 1841 to finish Alford's term. Re-elected in 1842. Lost re-election.	Walter T. Colquitt (D-Columbus) Elected in December 1841 to finish Nisbet's term. Retired.	Lott Warren (W-Palmyra) Elected in 1838. Re-elected in 1840. Retired.
28th (1843–1845)	Mark A. Cooper (D-Columbus) Elected in December 1841 to finish Dawson's term. Re-elected in 1842. Resigned to run for Governor of Georgia.	William H. Stiles (D-Cassville) Elected in 1842. Retired.	John B. Lamar (D-Macon) Elected in 1842. Resigned July 29, 1843.	John Millen (D-Savannah) Elected in 1842. Died October 15, 1843.	Howell Cobb (D-Athens) Elected in 1842. Redistricted to the 6th district.	Hugh A. Haralson (D-LaGrange) Elected in 1842. Redistricted to the 4th district.	Edward J. Black (D-Jacksonboro) Elected in December 1841 to finish Alford's term. Re-elected in 1842. Lost re-election.	John H. Lumpkin (D-Rome) Elected in 1842. Redistricted to the 5th district.	Seat eliminated in 1843.
28th (1843–1845)	Alexander H. Stephens (W-Crawfordville) Elected October 2, 1843, to finish Cooper's term. Redistricted to the 7th district.	William H. Stiles (D-Cassville) Elected in 1842. Retired.	Absalom H. Chappell (W-Macon) Elected October 2, 1843, to finish Lamar's term. Lost re-election.	John Millen (D-Savannah) Elected in 1842. Died October 15, 1843.	Howell Cobb (D-Athens) Elected in 1842. Redistricted to the 6th district.	Hugh A. Haralson (D-LaGrange) Elected in 1842. Redistricted to the 4th district.	Edward J. Black (D-Jacksonboro) Elected in December 1841 to finish Alford's term. Re-elected in 1842. Lost re-election.	John H. Lumpkin (D-Rome) Elected in 1842. Redistricted to the 5th district.	Seat eliminated in 1843.
28th (1843–1845)	Alexander H. Stephens (W-Crawfordville) Elected October 2, 1843, to finish Cooper's term. Redistricted to the 7th district.	William H. Stiles (D-Cassville) Elected in 1842. Retired.	Absalom H. Chappell (W-Macon) Elected October 2, 1843, to finish Lamar's term. Lost re-election.	Duncan L. Clinch (W-St. Marys) Elected January 1, 1844, to finish Millen's term. Retired.	Howell Cobb (D-Athens) Elected in 1842. Redistricted to the 6th district.	Hugh A. Haralson (D-LaGrange) Elected in 1842. Redistricted to the 4th district.	Edward J. Black (D-Jacksonboro) Elected in December 1841 to finish Alford's term. Re-elected in 1842. Lost re-election.	John H. Lumpkin (D-Rome) Elected in 1842. Redistricted to the 5th district.	Seat eliminated in 1843.
District returned to district representation in 1845.
At-large seat restored for the 48th Congress
48th (1883–1885)	Thomas Hardeman Jr. (D-Macon) Elected in 1882. [data missing]								
