= 1806 Georgia's at-large congressional district special elections =

There were two special elections in Georgia's at-large congressional district in 1806; one on September 15, 1806, to fill a vacancy caused by the resignation of Joseph Bryan (DR) earlier that year, and the other sometime before December 6, 1806, to fill a vacancy caused by the resignation of Thomas Spalding (DR) earlier that year.

== Election results ==
Candidate	Party	Votes	Percent
Dennis Smelt	Democratic-Republican	1,929	47.1%
George Troup	Democratic-Republican	1,927	47.1%
Buckner Harris	Democratic-Republican	237	5.8%

Smelt took his seat on December 26, 1806.

== See also ==
- List of special elections to the United States House of Representatives
