= Bolling Hall =

American politician (1767–1836)

Bolling Hall (December 25, 1767 – February 25, 1836) was a United States representative from Georgia. He was born in Dinwiddie County, Virginia. He served in the American Revolutionary War at the age of 16. After the war, he moved to Hancock County, Georgia in 1792 at the age of 25, where new lands were being opened for settlement.

Hall held several local offices before being elected to the Georgia House of Representatives, serving two terms, 1800–1802 and 1804–1806. He was elected as a Republican to the 12th, 13th and 14th United States Congresses, serving from March 4, 1811, until March 3, 1817. He retired to private life after leaving Congress.

Hall moved to Alabama in 1818. He developed a cotton plantation near Montgomery, Alabama. He was the chairman of the reception committee to welcome Revolutionary war hero General Lafayette on his tour of the United States in 1824–1825. Hall died in 1836 on his plantation, Ellerslie, in Autauga (now Elmore) County, Alabama. He was buried there.

U.S. House of Representatives
Preceded by Dennis Smelt	Member of the U.S. House of Representatives from Georgia's at-large congressional district March 4, 1811 – March 3, 1817	Succeeded by Joel Crawford
