= Jabez Young Jackson =

American politician

Member of the U.S. House of Representatives from Georgia's at-large district
- In office October 5, 1835 – March 3, 1839
- Preceded by: James Moore Wayne
- Succeeded by: Walter T. Colquitt

Personal details
- Born: August 5, 1790 Savannah, Georgia, U.S.
- Died: Clarkesville, Georgia, Georgia, U.S.

Jabez Young Jackson (born 5 August 1790) was a U.S. representative from Georgia. He was also a slave owner.

== Biography ==
Jackson was born in Savannah, Georgia, the son of James Jackson (1757–1806), and later uncle of James Jackson (1819–1887). He was elected as a Jacksonian to the Twenty-fourth United States Congress to fill the vacancy caused by the resignation of James M. Wayne. In 1836, he was reelected as a Democrat to the Twenty-fifth United States Congress, serving from October 5, 1835 – March 3, 1839.

U.S. House of Representatives
Preceded by James Moore Wayne	Member of the U.S. House of Representatives from Georgia's at-large congressional district October 5, 1835 – March 3, 1839	Succeeded by Walter T. Colquitt
