= George Cary (Georgia politician) =

American politician (1789–1843)

Member of the U.S. House of Representatives from Georgia's at-large district
- In office March 4, 1823 – March 3, 1827
- Preceded by: George R. Gilmer
- Succeeded by: Tomlinson Fort

Member of the Georgia House of Representatives
- In office 1819–1821

Personal details
- Born: August 7, 1789 near Allens Fresh, Charles County, Maryland, U.S.
- Died: September 10, 1843 (aged 54) Thomaston, Georgia, U.S.
- Resting place: Methodist Churchyard
- Party: Jacksonian
- Occupation: Politician, lawyer, newspaper editor

George Cary (August 7, 1789 – September 10, 1843) was a United States representative from Georgia. He was born near Allens Fresh, Charles County, Maryland. He received a classical education and studied law. He was admitted to the bar and commenced practice in Frederick, Maryland. He was also engaged in agricultural pursuits.

Cary moved to Appling, Georgia. He was a member of the Georgia House of Representatives 1819–1821. He was elected in 1822 as a Crawford Republican to the 18th United States Congress and a Jacksonian to the 19th Congress (March 4, 1823 – March 3, 1827). He engaged in the newspaper business and edited the Hickory Nut. He was again a member of the Georgia House of Representatives in 1834. He died in Thomaston, Georgia, in 1843 and was buried in the Methodist Churchyard.

U.S. House of Representatives
Preceded by George Rockingham Gilmer	Member of the U.S. House of Representatives from Georgia's at-large congressional district March 4, 1823 – March 3, 1827	Succeeded by Tomlinson Fort
