= Thomas Marsh Forman =

Thomas Marsh Forman (January 4, 1809 – September 27, 1875) was a prominent Confederate politician. He was born Thomas Forman Bryan in Chatham County, Georgia, to US Representative Joseph Bryan and Delia Forman Bryan. In 1846, he changed his name in order to inherit the estate of his maternal grandfather, General Thomas Marsh Forman.

Forman served in the Georgia state senate in 1847. Forman represented the state in the Provisional Confederate Congress from August 1861 to February 1862, replacing Francis Stebbins Bartow, who had been killed at the First Battle of Manassas.
