= Jesse Franklin Cleveland =

American politician (1804–1841)

Member of the U.S. House of Representatives from Georgia's at-large district
- In office October 5, 1835 – March 3, 1839
- Preceded by: William Schley
- Succeeded by: Julius C. Alford

Member of the Georgia State Senate
- In office 1831–1843

Personal details
- Born: October 25, 1804 Greenville, South Carolina, U.S.
- Died: June 22, 1841 (aged 36)
- Resting place: St. Michael's Church
- Party: Jacksonian
- Profession: Politician

Jesse Franklin Cleveland (October 25, 1804 – June 22, 1841) was a United States representative and businessman from Georgia.

Cleveland was born in Greenville, South Carolina, in 1804. He attended school in South Carolina before moving to Georgia. Cleveland served in the Georgia Senate from 1831 to 1843. In 1835, Cleveland was elected as a Jacksonian representative from Georgia to the 24th United States Congress to complete the term left vacant when William Schley resigned to become Governor of Georgia. Cleveland was reelected to the 25th Congress and his congressional service spanned from October 5, 1835, until March 3, 1839.

After his congressional service, Cleveland moved to Charleston, South Carolina in 1839 and ran a business. He also served as a director of the Bank of South Carolina. Cleveland died on June 22, 1841, and was buried in cemetery of St. Michael's Church.

U.S. House of Representatives
Preceded by William Schley	Member of the U.S. House of Representatives from Georgia's at-large congressional district October 5, 1835 – March 3, 1839	Succeeded by Julius C. Alford
