= James Archibald Meriwether =

American politician and jurist (1806–1852)

James Archibald Meriwether (September 20, 1806 – April 18, 1852) was a United States representative, jurist and lawyer from Georgia. His uncle was U.S. Representative James Meriwether.

== Early years and education ==
Meriwether was born near Washington, Georgia, on September 20, 1806, to James and Susannah Hatcher Meriweather. He graduated from the University of Georgia (UGA) in Athens with a Bachelor of Arts (AB) degree in 1826.

== Legal career and military service ==
After studying law and gaining admittance to the state bar, he practiced law in Eatonton, Georgia. He was also captain of a volunteer unit during the Seminole Wars.

== Political service ==
From 1831 to 1836 and again in 1838, Meriwether served in the Georgia House of Representatives as a representative of Clarke County. From 1845 to 1849, he served as a judge of the superior court for the Eatonton (Ocmulgee) district . In 1840, he was elected as a Whig Representative from Georgia to the 27th United States Congress and served one term from March 4, 1841, until March 3, 1843. He returned to the Georgia House in for one term in 1843. In 1851 he was once again elected to the Georgia House of Representatives, and served as Speaker of that body in 1852.

== Personal life ==
Meriwether married Rebecca Carleton McKigney, and together the couple had eight children who survived past childhood.

== Death ==
Meriwether died on April 18, 1852, in Eatonton and was buried in that city's Union Cemetery.

== See also ==
- List of speakers of the Georgia House of Representatives

U.S. House of Representatives
Preceded by Mark Anthony Cooper	Member of the U.S. House of Representatives from Georgia's at-large congressional district March 4, 1841 – March 3, 1843	Succeeded by Howell Cobb
