= 1819 Georgia's at-large congressional district special election =

Georgia's at-large congressional district special election, 1819 was called to fill a vacancy created when the former congressman was elected to the United States Senate.

== Vacancy ==
A special election was held in Georgia's at-large congressional district on January 4, 1819, to fill vacancies left in both the 15th and 16th Congresses by the resignation of John Forsyth (DR) upon being elected to the Senate, after having been re-elected the previous year to the House. At the time, Congressional terms began March 4, his resignation thus created a vacancy in the remainder of the 15th Congress as well as in the upcoming 16th Congress.

== Election ==
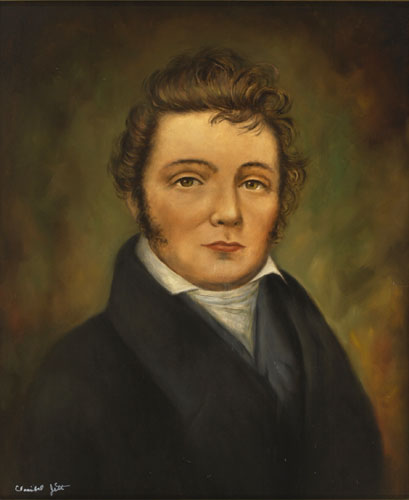
Robert R. Reid

Election results reported at the time appear to indicate that a single election was held for both vacancies in most counties of Georgia. One newspaper reports two sets of returns for Richmond County, suggesting that that county may have been the only one that held separate ballots for both vacancies

== Election result ==
Candidate	Party	Votes	Percent
Robert R. Reid	Democratic-Republican	5,543	66.7%
Homer Virgil Milton		2,772	33.3%

Reid took his seat on February 18, 1819, near the end of the Second Session of the 15th Congress.

== See also ==
- List of special elections to the United States House of Representatives
