= 1824 Georgia's at-large congressional district special election =

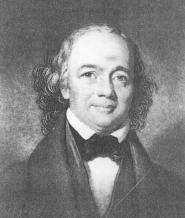

Nominee	Richard H. Wilde	William C. Lyman
Party	Crawford Republican	Democratic-Republican
Popular vote	5,002	3,165
Percentage	61.2%	38.8%
- County results Wilde: 50–60% 60–70% 70–80% 80–90% >90% Lyman: 50–60% 60–70% 70–80% 80–90% Tie
U.S. Representative before election
Thomas W. Cobb
Democratic-Republican
Elected U.S. Representative
Richard H. Wilde
Democratic-Republican

A special election was held in Georgia's at-large congressional district in 1824 to fill a vacancy left by the resignation of Thomas W. Cobb (C-DR) upon his election to the Senate

== Election results ==
Candidate	Party	Votes	Percent
Richard Henry Wilde	Crawford Republican	5,002	61.2%
William C. Lyman	Democratic-Republican	3,165	38.8%

Wilde took his seat February 7, 1825

== See also ==
- List of special elections to the United States House of Representatives
