= Palmyra, Georgia =

Unincorporated community in Georgia, U.S.

Coordinates: 31°38′16″N 84°11′40″W

Palmyra is an unincorporated community in Lee County, in the U.S. state of Georgia.

== History ==
The community was named after the ancient city of Palmyra, Syria. The Georgia General Assembly incorporated Palmyra as a town in 1840.

With the construction of the railroad through the area and the concerns that the community's low elevation was prone to mosquito-borne diseases, as a result business activity shifted to nearby Albany, and the town's population dwindled. The Palmyra post office closed in 1891. The town's municipal charter was repealed in 1995.
