= Thomas Telfair =

American politician

Member of the U.S. House of Representatives from Georgia's at-large district
- In office March 4, 1813 – March 3, 1817
- Preceded by: District created
- Succeeded by: William Terrell

Personal details
- Born: March 2, 1780 Savannah, Province of Georgia
- Died: February 18, 1818 (aged 37)
- Party: Democratic-Republican
- Parent: Edward Telfair (father)
- Education: College of New Jersey
- Profession: Politician, lawyer

Thomas Telfair (March 2, 1780 – February 18, 1818) was a United States representative from Georgia. Born in Savannah, the third of four sons of Governor Edward Telfair, he graduated from the College of New Jersey in 1805. He went on to study law in Connecticut, was admitted to the bar, and commenced practice in Savannah.

Telfair was elected as a Democratic-Republican to the 13th and 14th United States Congresses, serving from March 4, 1813, to March 3, 1817. He died in February 1818 at the age of 37.

Like his father's before him, Thomas Telfair's remains were likely interred at the family's plantation and moved, many years later, to Savannah's Evergreen Cemetery. The cemetery was established in 1846; in the 20th century its name was changed to Bonaventure, for the original plantation on the site.

U.S. House of Representatives
Preceded by New seat	Member of the U.S. House of Representatives from Georgia's at-large congressional district March 4, 1813 – March 3, 1817	Succeeded by William Terrell
