= Peter Early =

American politician

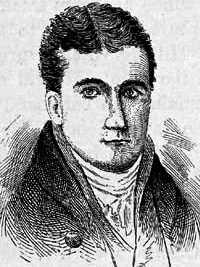

28th Governor of Georgia
- In office November 5, 1813 – November 20, 1815
- Preceded by: David Brydie Mitchell
- Succeeded by: David Brydie Mitchell

Member of the U.S. House of Representatives from Georgia's at-large district
- In office January 10, 1803 – March 3, 1807
- Preceded by: John Milledge
- Succeeded by: Howell Cobb

Personal details
- Born: Peter Early; June 20, 1773 Madison, Colony of Virginia, British America
- Died: August 15, 1817 (aged 44) Scull Shoals, Georgia, US
- Resting place: West bank of the Oconee River
- Party: Democratic-Republican Party
- Education: Washington and Lee University; Princeton University

Peter Early (June 20, 1773 – August 15, 1817) was an American lawyer, jurist, and politician who served as governor of Georgia and as a two-term U.S. congressman during the early 19th century.

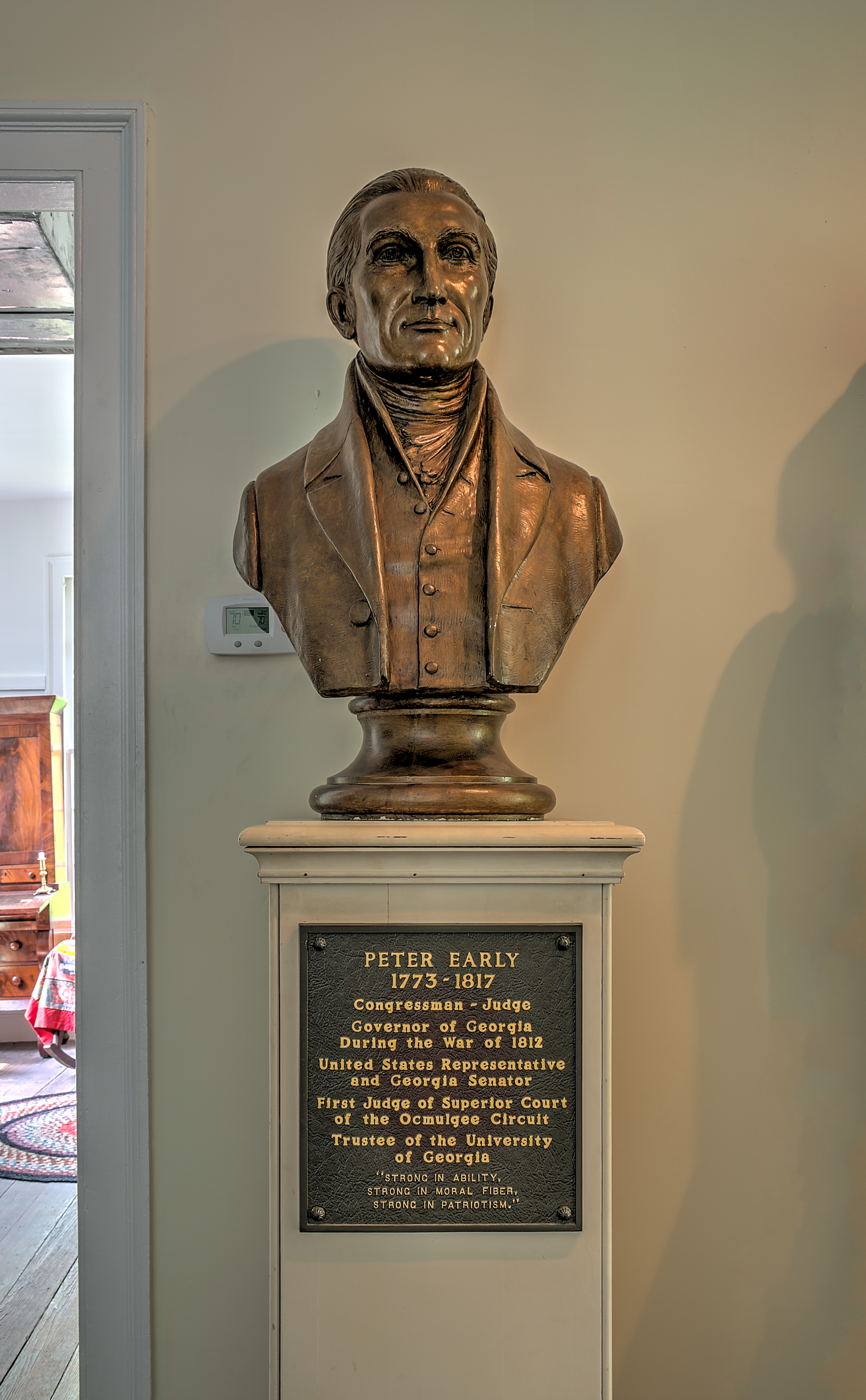
Bust of Early at the Washington-Wilkes Historical Museum

== Early life ==
He was born near Madison in the Colony of Virginia, in 1773, the son of Joel Early and Lucy Smith. He had a sister, Lucy, who later married Charles Lewis Mathews, and a brother, Eleazer, who built the first hotel in Savannah, Georgia. His cousin, Jubal Early, became the grandfather of Jubal Anderson Early (1816–1894), later a prominent Confederate general.

Peter Early graduated from the Lexington Academy (current-day Washington and Lee University). He later graduated from Princeton College, in 1792. His family moved to Wilkes County, Georgia, on the central eastern border, that same year. Early was studying law with Jared Ingersoll in Philadelphia. After finishing his legal studies, Peter Early joined his family in Wilkes County.

There he married Ann Adams Smith in 1793. In 1796 he began his law practice in Washington, the county seat of Wilkes County.

== Political life ==
Early was elected as a Representative from Georgia to the 8th United States Congress to serve the remainder of the term left vacant by the resignation of John Milledge, who had been elected as Governor of Georgia. Early was re-elected to the 9th Congress. During his congressional service, Early was one of the House managers (prosecutors) in the impeachment trials of John Pickering, New Hampshire United States District Court judge, in January 1804, and Samuel Chase, Associate Justice of the United States Supreme Court, in December of that year. Early did not seek reelection in 1806.

After his congressional service, Early was elected by the Georgia General Assembly as judge of the Superior Court, Ocmulgee Circuit, serving in that court from 1807 until 1813. The respect and popularity he gained from his service on the bench propelled him to be elected the 28th governor of Georgia in 1813. He served one term, through 1815, during which he was instrumental in committing funds on several occasions from the state treasury to help raise and supply additional troops from Georgia to the American military forces during the latter half of the War of 1812.

Early moved to Greene County after his gubernatorial term, where he was elected to the Georgia Senate.

== Death ==
During his term in the Georgia Senate, Peter Early died on August 15, 1817, at his summer home near Scull Shoals in Greene County. He was buried on the west bank of the Oconee River near his Fontenoy Plantation home, with a simple monument to mark his grave.

In 1914, his family had his remains reinterred in the Greensboro City Cemetery.

== Legacy and honors ==
Early County, Georgia, and Fort Early were named in his honor.

== Notes ==
U.S. House of Representatives
Preceded by John Milledge	Member of the U.S. House of Representatives from Georgia's at-large congressional district January 10, 1803 – March 3, 1807	Succeeded by Howell Cobb
Political offices
Preceded by David Brydie Mitchell	Governor of Georgia; November 5, 1813 – November 20, 1815	Succeeded by David Brydie Mitchell
