= Howell Cobb (born 1772) =

American politician

Member of the U.S. House of Representatives from Georgia's at-large district
- In office March 4, 1807 – September 1812
- Preceded by: Peter Early
- Succeeded by: William Barnett

Personal details
- Born: August 3, 1772 Granville County, North Carolina, U.S.
- Died: May 26, 1818 (aged 45) Cherry Hill plantation, Georgia, U.S.
- Party: Democratic-Republican
- Relatives: Howell Cobb (nephew)

Howell Cobb (August 3, 1772 – May 26, 1818) was an American politician, farmer and soldier.

Born in Granville County, North Carolina, Cobb later moved to Louisville, Georgia. From February 23, 1793, until January 31, 1806, Cobb served in various military positions in the United States Army including ensign and lieutenant in the Second Sub Legion and as captain in the Artillerists and Engineers.

In 1806, Cobb was elected as Democratic-Republican to the 10th United States Congress, and he was reelected to that position in the 11th, and 12th United States Congresses. He resigned from Congress before October 1812 to accept a captain's commission in the U.S. Army to fight in the War of 1812. After his second period of military service, he returned to his plantation, Cherry Hill, northwest of Louisville. Cobb died there in 1818 and was buried in the family cemetery on that estate. At time of his death he owned several slaves. In his will he emancipated his slave William Hill, and left the rest of his slaves to his nephew Howell Cobb. In his will he stated:

It would afford one of the greatest pleasure & satisfaction to liberate all my slaves; but such is the present existing state of Society, that by so doing I may act improperly; and it is by no means improbable that it would be no real lasting advantage to them; and I presume that their present condition, under the care & protection of generous & human masters, will be much better for them than a State of freedom.

Cobb's nephew and namesake Howell Cobb served as the Speaker of the U.S. House of Representatives, Governor of Georgia, U.S. Secretary of the Treasury and Provisional President Pro Tem of the Confederate States of America

U.S. House of Representatives
Preceded by Peter Early	Member of the U.S. House of Representatives from Georgia's at-large congressional district March 4, 1807 – September 1812	Succeeded by William Barnett
