= Dennis Smelt =

American politician (1763–1818)

Dennis Smelt (November 23, 1763 – October 22, 1818) was a doctor and United States Representative from Georgia. He was born to the Reverend John Smelt, an Oxford-educated Church of England clergyman, in Essex County, Virginia. Smelt attended the College of William & Mary before travelling to England for three years to study medicine. He returned to America, settling in Augusta, Georgia, in 1789. He married Mary Cooper, the third of five daughters of merchant Annanias Cooper, in 1798.

Smelt was elected as a Democratic-Republican to the 9th United States Congress to fill the vacancy caused by the resignation of United States Representative Joseph Bryan. He was reelected to the 10th and 11th Congresses (September 1, 1806 – March 3, 1811). He was not a candidate for reelection to the Twelfth Congress. He died on October 22, 1818, in Augusta, Georgia.

U.S. House of Representatives
Preceded by Joseph Bryan	Member of the U.S. House of Representatives from Georgia's at-large congressional district September 1, 1806 – March 3, 1811	Succeeded by Bolling Hall
