= John Milledge =

American politician (1757–1818)

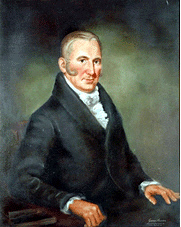

President pro tempore of the United States Senate
- In office January 30, 1809 – May 21, 1809
- Preceded by: Stephen R. Bradley
- Succeeded by: Andrew Gregg

United States Senator from Georgia
- In office June 19, 1806 – November 14, 1809
- Preceded by: James Jackson
- Succeeded by: Charles Tait

26th Governor of Georgia
- In office November 4, 1802 – September 23, 1806
- Preceded by: Josiah Tattnall
- Succeeded by: Jared Irwin

Member of the U.S. House of Representatives from Georgia's at-large district
- In office March 4, 1795 – March 3, 1799
- Preceded by: Thomas P. Carnes
- Succeeded by: Benjamin Taliaferro
- In office March 4, 1801 – May 1802
- Preceded by: James Jones
- Succeeded by: Peter Early

Member of the U.S. House of Representatives from Georgia's 1st district
- In office November 22, 1792 – March 3, 1793
- Preceded by: Anthony Wayne
- Succeeded by: None, seat eliminated

4th Attorney General of Georgia
- In office 1780–1781
- Preceded by: Williams Stephens
- Succeeded by: Samuel Stirk

Personal details
- Born: 1757 Savannah, Province of Georgia, British America
- Died: February 9, 1818 (aged 60–61) Augusta, Georgia, U.S.
- Party: Democratic-Republican

Military service
- Allegiance: United States
- Branch/service: Georgia Militia
- Rank: Colonel
- Battles/wars: American Revolutionary War: Siege of Savannah

John Milledge (1757 – February 9, 1818) was an American politician. He fought in the American Revolution and later served as a United States representative, the 26th governor of Georgia, and a United States senator. Milledge was a founder of Athens, Georgia, and the University of Georgia. From January to May 1809, Milledge served briefly as president pro tempore of the United States Senate.

== Revolutionary War ==
John Milledge was born in Savannah, the grandson of an original settler of Georgia. He was tutored privately and studied law. After being admitted to the bar, he opened a law practice in Savannah. He owned slaves. At the onset of the Revolutionary War, Milledge was part of a group that took colonial governor Sir James Wright as a prisoner in 1775. He also took part in a raid of Savannah's royal armory to procure gunpowder for the revolutionary cause. When the British captured Savannah, Milledge escaped to South Carolina, where American patriots nearly hanged him as a spy. He participated in the Siege of Savannah in an attempt to drive the British forces out. In 1778, he served as an aide to Governor John Houstoun in an abortive campaign against the British in East Florida. In 1781, as a colonel in the Georgia militia, he helped to recapture Augusta.

== Political career ==
=== State legislature and U.S. Congress ===
Milledge's political career began in 1779, when he was elected to the patriot general assembly. After serving as the attorney general of Georgia, Milledge was a member of the Georgia General Assembly. While in the General Assembly, he spoke out forcefully against the Yazoo Land Acts. In 1792, the House of Representatives declared the seat of Anthony Wayne vacant due to disputes over his residency. Milledge was elected to the Second Congress to fill this vacancy and served from November 22, 1792, to March 3, 1793. Later, Milledge would be elected to the Fourth and Fifth Congresses, serving from March 4, 1795, to March 3, 1799. In 1801, he was again elected to Congress, this time as a Democratic-Republican, and served from March 4, 1801, until he resigned in May 1802 to become Governor of Georgia.

=== Governor of Georgia ===
Milledge was Governor of Georgia from 1802 to 1806. As governor, he created Georgia's first land lottery to combat corruption in the distribution of former Creek lands to settlers. He also reorganized the state militia, and built a road from Georgia to Tennessee passing through Cherokee lands.

In 1803, Milledgeville, Georgia, state capital from 1804 to 1868, was named in his honor.

=== U.S. Senate ===
In 1806, he was elected as a Democratic-Republican to the United States Senate to fill the vacancy caused by the death of James Jackson. He was a loyal and enthusiastic supporter of the policies of President Thomas Jefferson. In the 10th United States Congress, he was named President pro tempore of the Senate. He served as a Senator from June 19, 1806, until November 14, 1809, when he resigned.

=== Foreign Policy ===
With regards to the Napoleonic Wars, Milledge was outspokenly pro-British. Milledge remained very hostile to the French Revolution and believed that a close relationship with the United Kingdom was in the interest of the United States. Milledge said he saw "no value" in attempting to maintain relations with revolutionary France.

== The University of Georgia ==
While serving in the U.S. House of Representatives, Milledge was named to a commission to establish a site for the state University of Georgia (incorporated January 27, 1785). On July 25, 1801, Milledge bought with his own money some land on the Oconee River for the school, and named the surrounding area Athens, in honor of the city of Plato's Academy.

John Milledge Hall (circa 1921 as a male dormitory) at the University of Georgia, now houses the Office for Student Success and Achievement and the Regents' Center for Learning Disorders.

== Death and legacy ==
After retiring from the United States Senate, Milledge returned home, to live out his final years at his plantation near Augusta, Georgia. He died there, February 9, 1818, and was buried in Summerville Cemetery in that same city.

Milledge Avenue in downtown Athens is named for him. Milledge Avenue in the Grant Park neighborhood of Atlanta is also named for him. Milledge Road in Augusta is also named for him.

John Milledge Academy in Milledgeville is named for John Milledge.

U.S. House of Representatives
Preceded by Anthony Wayne	Member of the U.S. House of Representatives from Georgia's 1st congressional district November 22, 1792 – March 3, 1793	Succeeded by Thomas P. Carnes
Preceded by Thomas P. Carnes	Member of the U.S. House of Representatives from Georgia's at-large congressional district March 4, 1795 – March 3, 1799	Succeeded by Benjamin Taliaferro
Preceded by James Jones	Member of the U.S. House of Representatives from Georgia's at-large congressional district March 4, 1801 – May 1802	Succeeded by Peter Early
Political offices
Preceded by Josiah Tattnall	Governor of Georgia; 1802–1806	Succeeded by Jared Irwin
U.S. Senate
Preceded by James Jackson	U.S. senator (Class 3) from Georgia; June 19, 1806 – November 14, 1809, Served alongside: Abraham Baldwin, George Jones, William H. Crawford	Succeeded by Charles Tait
Honorary titles
Preceded by Stephen R. Bradley	President pro tempore of the United States Senate; January 30, 1809 – May 21, 1809	Succeeded by Andrew Gregg
