= Joseph Bryan =

American politician (1773–1812)

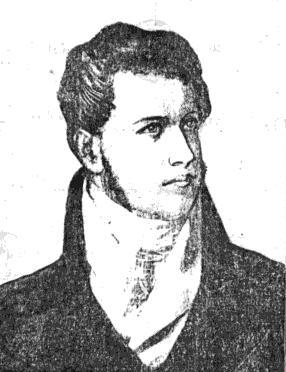

Member of the U.S. House of Representatives from Georgia's at-large district
- In office March 4, 1803 – 1806
- Preceded by: District established
- Succeeded by: Dennis Smelt

Personal details
- Born: August 18, 1773 Savannah, Georgia, U.S.
- Died: September 12, 1812 (aged 39) Wilmington Island, Georgia, U.S.
- Party: Democratic-Republican
- Relations: Jonathan Bryan (grandfather); James Proctor Screven (son-in-law)
- Education: University of Oxford

Joseph Bryan (August 18, 1773 – September 12, 1812) was an American politician who served as a member of the United States House of Representatives for Georgia's at-large congressional district from 1803 to 1806.

== Early life ==
Bryan was born Savannah, Georgia, in 1773 to Josiah Bryan (1746–1774) and Elizabeth Pendarvis (1755–1804). He was educated by private tutors and attended the University of Oxford in England.

== Career ==
Bryan traveled in France during the American Revolutionary War. He later engaged in the slave trade on Wilmington Island and in Savannah, Georgia.

Bryan was elected as a Republican to the 8th and 9th United States congresses and served from March 4, 1803, until his resignation in 1806.

== Personal life ==
In 1805, Bryan married Delia Forman (1783–1825), daughter of General Thomas Marsh Forman. They had the following five children: John Randolph Bryan (1806–1887), Hannah Georgia Brown (1807–1887), Thomas Marsh Bryan Forman (1809–1875), Sarah Virginia Bryan (1810–1838) and Joseph Bryan Jr. (1812–1863). Hannah married Dr. James Proctor Screven (1799–1859). This reunited the Screven and Bryan families after the death of Joseph's father, Josiah, following which Elizabeth Pendarvis Bryan remarried, to John Screven (1750–1801), James's grandfather.

Bryan's grandfather, Jonathan, assisted James Edward Oglethorpe in setting out the Savannah colony and served in the Revolutionary War.

== Death ==
Bryan died in 1812, aged 39, at his Nonchalance estate. He was interred in the Bryan family cemetery. His widow survived him by thirteen years and was buried beside him, aged 37.
