= 1815 Georgia gubernatorial election =

- November 20, 1815
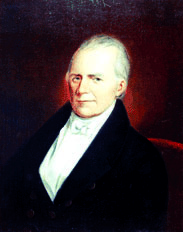

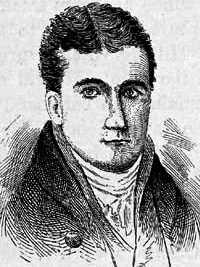
Nominee	David Brydie Mitchell	Peter Early
Party	Democratic-Republican	Democratic-Republican
Popular vote	67	49
Percentage	55.83%	40.83%
Governor before election
Peter Early
Democratic-Republican
Elected Governor
David Brydie Mitchell
Democratic-Republican

The 1815 Georgia gubernatorial election was held on November 20, 1815, in order to elect the Governor of Georgia. Democratic-Republican candidate and former Governor David Brydie Mitchell defeated fellow Democratic-Republican candidate and incumbent Governor Peter Early, Democratic-Republican candidate and former Governor Jared Irwin and Democratic-Republican candidate John Clark in a Georgia General Assembly vote.

== General election ==
On election day, November 20, 1815, Democratic-Republican candidate David Brydie Mitchell won the election against his foremost opponent fellow Democratic-Republican candidate Peter Early after initially ending up with 4 votes short of beating Early during the first ballot. Mitchell was sworn in for his third term on November 20, 1815.

=== Results ===
Georgia gubernatorial election, 1815
Party	Candidate	Votes	%
Democratic-Republican	David Brydie Mitchell	67	55.83
Democratic-Republican	Peter Early (incumbent)	49	40.83
Democratic-Republican	Jared Irwin	2	1.67
Democratic-Republican	John Clark	2	1.67
Total votes		120	100.00
Democratic-Republican hold			
