= 1797 Georgia gubernatorial election =

- January 11, 1797
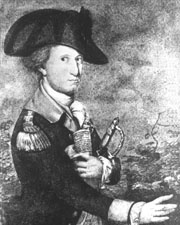
Nominee	James Jackson
Party	Democratic-Republican
Percentage	100.00%
Governor before election
Jared Irwin
Democratic-Republican
Elected Governor
James Jackson
Democratic-Republican

The 1797 Georgia gubernatorial election was held on January 11, 1797, in order to elect the Governor of Georgia. Democratic-Republican nominee and former United States Senator from Georgia James Jackson won the election in a Georgia General Assembly vote as he ran unopposed.

== General election ==
On election day, January 11, 1797, Democratic-Republican nominee James Jackson won the election as he ran unopposed. Jackson was sworn in as the 23rd Governor of Georgia on January 12, 1798.

=== Results ===
Georgia gubernatorial election, 1797
Party	Candidate	Votes	%
Democratic-Republican	James Jackson	Unopposed	100.00
Total votes			100.00
Democratic-Republican hold			
