= 1809 Georgia gubernatorial election =

- November 14, 1809
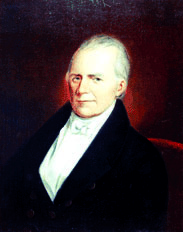

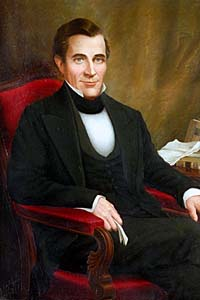
Nominee	David Brydie Mitchell	Jared Irwin
Party	Democratic-Republican	Democratic-Republican
Popular vote	61	41
Percentage	59.80%	40.20%
Governor before election
Jared Irwin
Democratic-Republican
Elected Governor
David Brydie Mitchell
Democratic-Republican

The 1809 Georgia gubernatorial election was held on November 14, 1809, in order to elect the governor of Georgia. Incumbent Democratic-Republican governor Jared Irwin lost his re-election bid to fellow Democratic-Republican candidate and former attorney general of Georgia David Brydie Mitchell in a Georgia General Assembly vote.

== General election ==
On election day, November 14, 1809, incumbent Democratic-Republican governor Jared Irwin lost re-election against his opponent Democratic-Republican candidate David Brydie Mitchell. Mitchell was sworn in as the 27th governor of Georgia on November 14, 1809.

=== Results ===
Georgia gubernatorial election, 1809
Party	Candidate	Votes	%
Democratic-Republican	David Brydie Mitchell	61	59.80
Democratic-Republican	Jared Irwin (incumbent)	41	40.20
Total votes		102	100.00
Democratic-Republican hold			
