= 1795 Georgia gubernatorial election =

- January 14, 1796
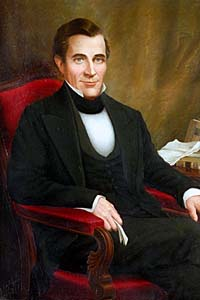
Nominee	Jared Irwin
Party	Democratic-Republican
Percentage	100.00%
Governor before election
George Mathews
Democratic-Republican
Elected Governor
Jared Irwin
Democratic-Republican

The 1795 Georgia gubernatorial election was held on January 14, 1796, in order to elect the Governor of Georgia. Democratic-Republican nominee Jared Irwin won the election in a Georgia General Assembly vote, as he ran unopposed.

== General election ==
On election day, January 14, 1796, Democratic-Republican nominee Jared Irwin won the election, as he ran unopposed. He was sworn in as the 22nd governor of Georgia on January 15, 1796.

=== Results ===
Georgia gubernatorial election, 1795
Party	Candidate	Votes	%
Democratic-Republican	Jared Irwin		100.00
Total votes			100.00
Democratic-Republican hold			
