= 1811 Georgia gubernatorial election =

- November 10, 1811
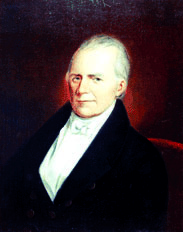

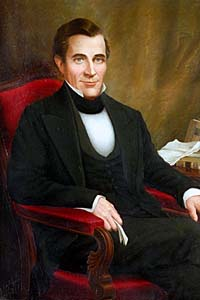
Nominee	David Brydie Mitchell	Jared Irwin
Party	Democratic-Republican	Democratic-Republican
Popular vote	81	30
Percentage	72.97%	27.03%
Governor before election
David Brydie Mitchell
Democratic-Republican
Elected Governor
David Brydie Mitchell
Democratic-Republican

The 1811 Georgia gubernatorial election was held on November 10, 1811, in order to elect the governor of Georgia. Incumbent Democratic-Republican governor David Brydie Mitchell won re-election against fellow Democratic-Republican candidate and former governor of Georgia Jared Irwin in a Georgia General Assembly vote.

== General election ==
On election day, November 10, 1811, incumbent Democratic-Republican governor David Brydie Mitchell won re-election against his opponent Democratic-Republican candidate Jared Irwin. Mitchell was sworn in for his second term on November 10, 1811.

=== Results ===
Georgia gubernatorial election, 1811
Party	Candidate	Votes	%
Democratic-Republican	David Brydie Mitchell (incumbent)	81	72.97
Democratic-Republican	Jared Irwin	30	27.03
Total votes		111	100.00
Democratic-Republican hold			
