= 1793 Georgia gubernatorial election =

- November 6, 1793
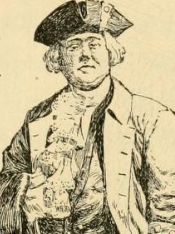

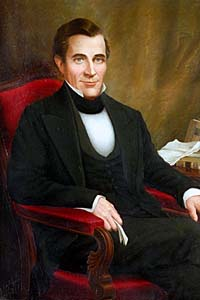
Nominee	George Mathews	Edward Telfair	Jared Irwin
Party	Democratic-Republican	Democratic-Republican	Democratic-Republican
Popular vote	15	21	17
Percentage	28.30%	39.62%	32.08%
Governor before election
Edward Telfair
Democratic-Republican
Elected Governor
George Mathews
Democratic-Republican

The 1793 Georgia gubernatorial election was held on November 6, 1793, in order to elect the governor of Georgia. Democratic-Republican candidate and former governor George Mathews defeated incumbent Democratic-Republican governor Edward Telfair and fellow Democratic-Republican candidate Jared Irwin in a Georgia General Assembly vote.

== General election ==
On election day, November 6, 1793, Democratic-Republican candidate George Mathews won the election against his foremost opponent Governor Edward Telfair following the Georgia Senate vote, after Governor Edward Telfair had won the Georgia House vote. Mathews was sworn in for his second term on November 7, 1793.

=== Results ===
Georgia gubernatorial election, 1793 (Georgia House Results)
Party	Candidate	Votes	%
Democratic-Republican	George Mathews	15	28.30
Democratic-Republican	Edward Telfair (incumbent)	21	39.62
Democratic-Republican	Jared Irwin	17	32.08
Total votes		53	100.00
Democratic-Republican hold			
