= George Wells (Georgia politician) =

American politician

Governor of Georgia
- In office February 5, 1780 – February 16, 1780
- Preceded by: Richard Howly

Personal details
- Died: February 16, 1780

George Wells (died February 16, 1780) was acting Governor of Georgia for a short spell in February 1780, before being killed in a duel with James Jackson.
