= 1807 Georgia gubernatorial election =

- November 10, 1807
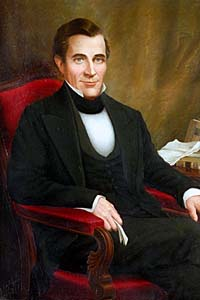

Nominee	Jared Irwin	Benjamin Taliaferro
Party	Democratic-Republican	Federalist
Popular vote	51	33
Percentage	60.71%	39.29%
Governor before election
Jared Irwin
Democratic-Republican
Elected Governor
Jared Irwin
Democratic-Republican

The 1807 Georgia gubernatorial election was held on November 10, 1807, in order to elect the governor of Georgia. Incumbent Democratic-Republican governor Jared Irwin defeated Federalist candidate and former member of the U.S. House of Representatives from Georgia's at-large congressional district Benjamin Taliaferro in a Georgia General Assembly vote.

== General election ==
On election day, November 10, 1807, incumbent Democratic-Republican governor Jared Irwin won the election against his opponent Federalist candidate Benjamin Taliaferro. Irwin was sworn in for his second term on November 10, 1807.

=== Results ===
Georgia gubernatorial election, 1807
Party	Candidate	Votes	%
Democratic-Republican	Jared Irwin (incumbent)	51	60.71
Federalist	Benjamin Taliaferro	33	39.29
Total votes		84	100.00
Democratic-Republican hold			
