= 1823 Georgia gubernatorial election =

- November 7, 1823
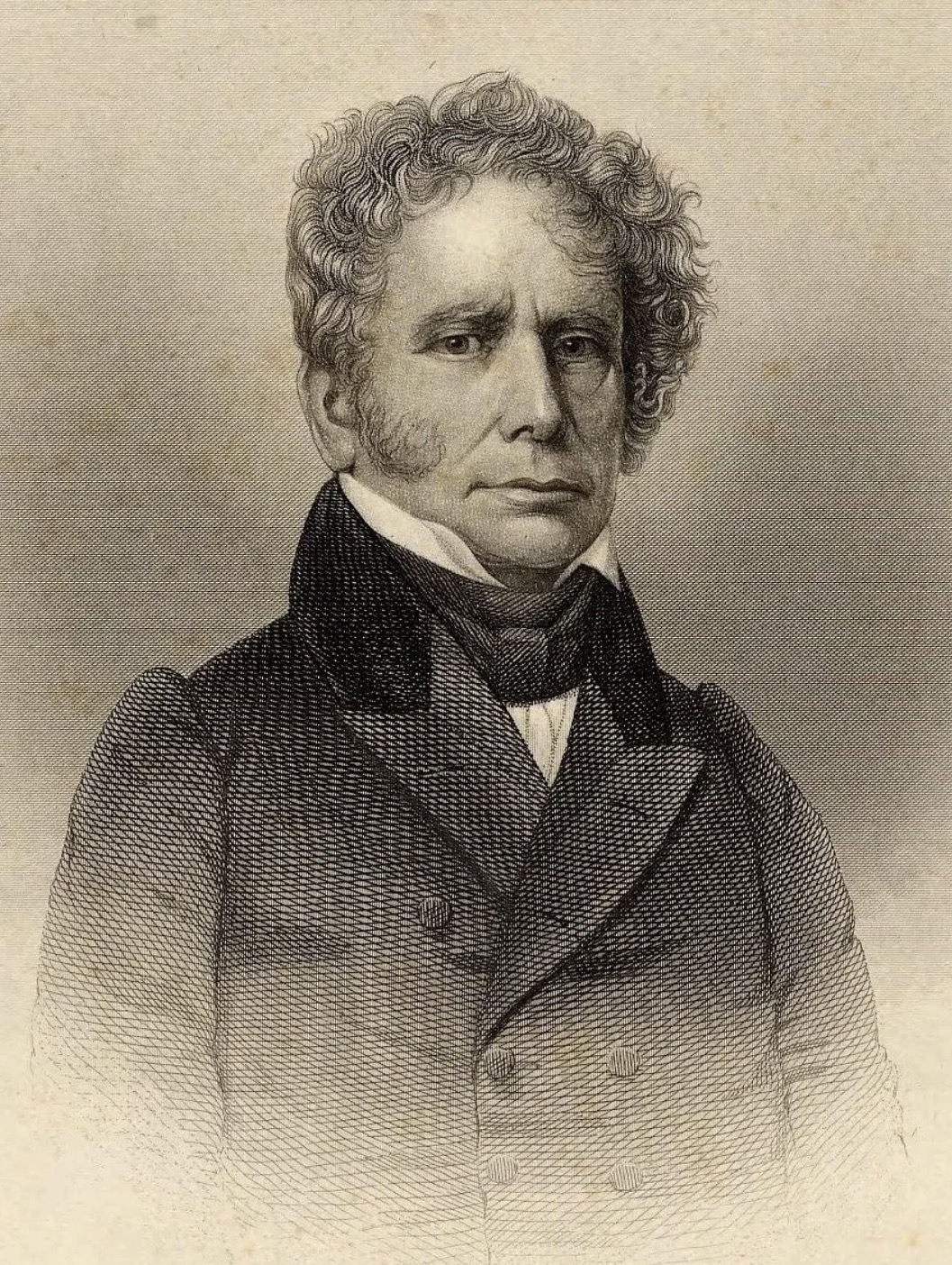

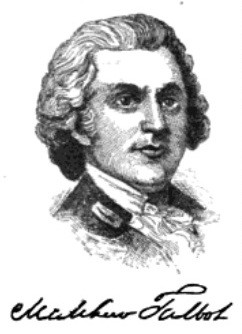
Nominee	George Troup	Matthew Talbot
Party	Democratic-Republican	Democratic-Republican
Popular vote	85	81
Percentage	51.20%	48.80%
Governor before election
John Clark
Democratic-Republican
Elected Governor
George Troup
Democratic-Republican

The 1823 Georgia gubernatorial election was held on November 7, 1823, in order to elect the Governor of Georgia. Democratic-Republican candidate and former United States Senator for Georgia George Troup narrowly defeated fellow Democratic-Republican candidate and former acting Governor Matthew Talbot in a Georgia General Assembly vote.

== General election ==
On election day, November 7, 1823, Democratic-Republican candidate George Troup won the election against his opponent fellow Democratic-Republican candidate Matthew Talbot by a small margin. Troup was sworn as the 32nd Governor of Georgia on November 7, 1823.

=== Results ===
Georgia gubernatorial election, 1823
Party	Candidate	Votes	%
Democratic-Republican	George Troup	85	51.20
Democratic-Republican	Matthew Talbot	81	48.80
Total votes		166	100.00
Democratic-Republican hold			
