= 1863 Georgia gubernatorial election =

- October 5, 1863
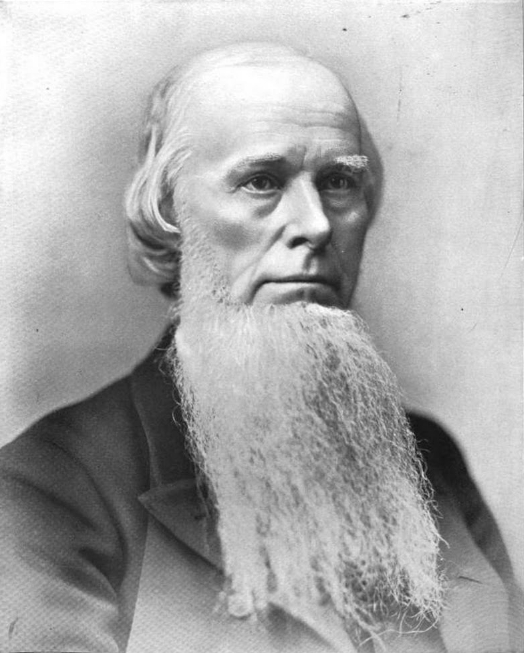

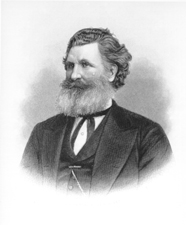

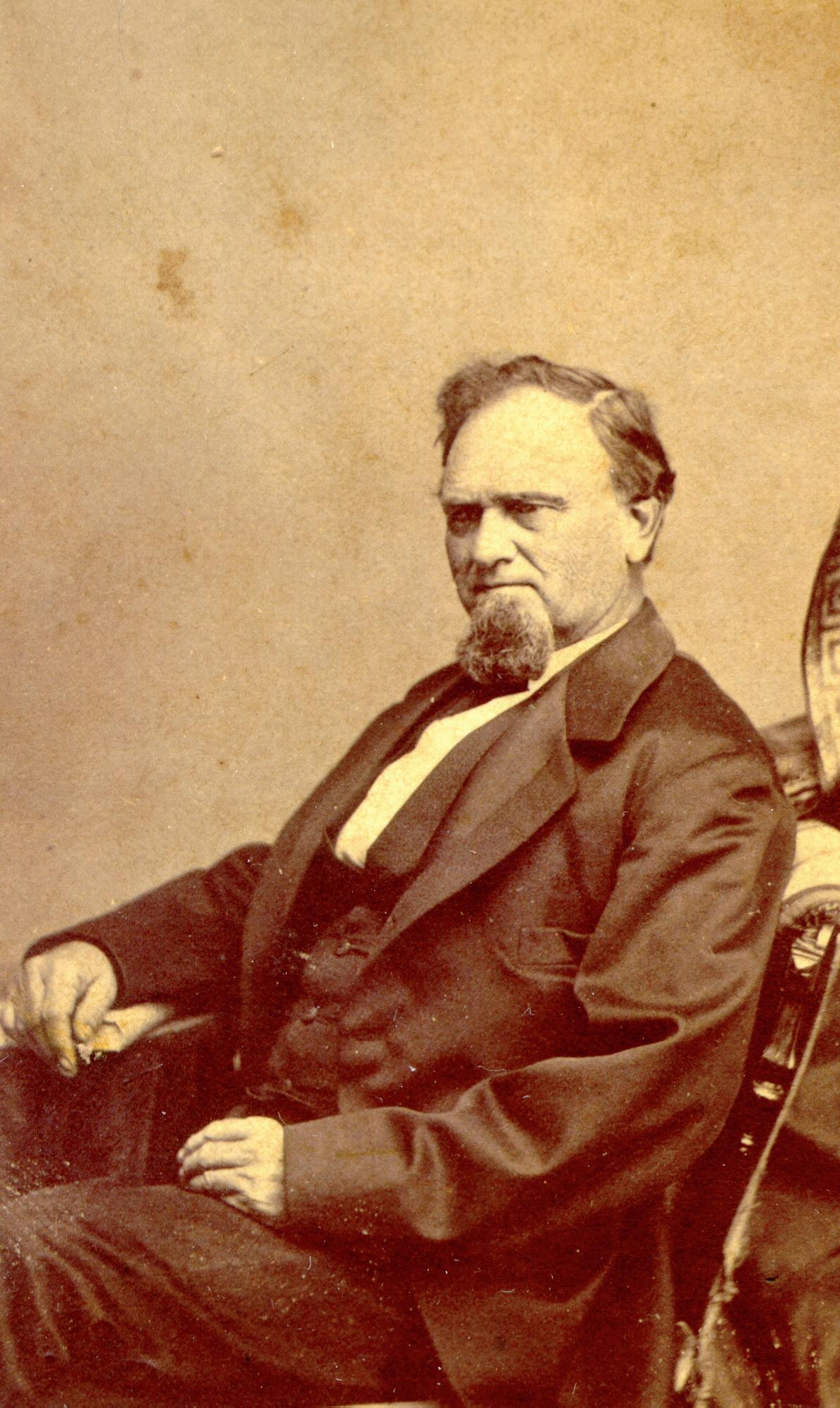
Nominee	Joseph E. Brown	Joshua Hill	Timothy Furlow
Party	Independent Democrat	Peace Party	Democratic
Alliance	Anti-Administration	Southern Unionist	Pro-Administration
Popular vote	36,558 (Note: Including returns from counties that were not included in the official count.)	18,272	10,024
Percentage	56.37%	28.17%	15.46%
- Results by County; Brown: 30–40% 40–50% 50–60% 60–70% 70–80% 80–90% >90% Hill: 30–40% 40–50% 50–60% 60–70% 70–80% 80–90% Furlow: <30% 40–50% 60–70% Tie: Rejected returns: No Data
Governor before election
Joseph E. Brown
Democratic
Elected Governor
Joseph E. Brown
Independent Democrat

The 1863 Georgia gubernatorial election was held on October 5, 1863, in order to elect the Governor of Georgia. It was the last gubernatorial election in Georgia under the Confederate States of America and saw Independent Democrat nominee and incumbent Governor Joseph E. Brown win a fourth and final term against Unionist nominee Joshua Hill and Pro-Administration nominee Lt. Col Timothy Furlow.

== Background ==
=== Search for a successor ===
Initially, Brown never intended to run for a fourth term and had early in 1863 begun to look around for a State Rights Democrat to succeed him. One while doing his duty towards the Confederacy, would protect the rights and sovereignty of Georgia.

He thought it was best to leave his opponents under the delusion that he would run for another term and so never made any public announcement of his plans to step down. In the meantime, he chose Linton Stephens, junior half-brother of Alexander H. Stephens, from a list of possible people to succeed him. Robert Toombs, Confederate Brigadier General, was his second choice and Brown was willing to step aside to support either of them.

Stephens refused to run for governor and so Brown turned to Toombs, who having resigned his brigade command in March 1863, returned to Georgia, and it was generally believed that he had political ambitions. Duff Green prophesied that Toombs would be elected governor of Georgia in the autumn of 1863 and that the state would possibly make peace with the Union. A. H. Kenan feared that Toombs would seek the office and he raised the question of Toombs' avowed opposition to President Davis in an effort to weaken Toombs's candidacy. The editor of the Enquirer did not want Toombs to seek the governorship as it would create a situation in Georgia analogous to that in North Carolina where an avowed anti-Davis man was standing for governor. Mention was made of Toombs's address on "The State of the Republic" at Sparta on June 17, 1863, an address in which Toombs roundly scored President Davis and the policies of the administration at Richmond.

It's highly possible that Toombs gave the governorship a consideration but he chose to run for Senate instead, being decisively defeated for the Confederate senate by former governor H. V. Johnson.

=== Brown candidacy ===
Brown feared that the "administration" at Richmond would support a Pro-Administration candidate with Confederate Congressman and former Confederate General Lucius J. Gartrell being seen as the most formidable possible candidate. It was his popularity among the troops that scared Brown the most.

Brown's concerns were not unfounded as there was a distinct demand in Georgia for a "Jeff Davis man" for governor. An editorial in the Daily Sun advocated for Brown's removal from office, arguing that a "good and loyal" individual should take his place. The organ disputed the notion that conscription was widely unpopular in Georgia or that Brown enjoyed significant support among the military, except for a small faction within the state militia seeking his favor. It predicted Brown's defeat by a margin of 20,000 votes.

Upon failing to identify another State Rights advocate to assume his position, Brown opted to seek reelection. Prior to launching his campaign, Brown took measures to disassociate himself from being perceived as an opponent of the current administration. He advocated for maintaining the existing administration and supported increasing Confederate private salaries from $11 to $20. He asserted that he had effectively neutralized any Pro-Administration candidate who might challenge him on grounds of loyalty to the Confederacy. In a letter of consent dated May 21, he acknowledged his previous pursuit of the governorship during peacetime but affirmed his willingness to continue serving if reelected during wartime. He suggested that changing leadership amidst the turmoil of war would be unwise and that he possessed superior qualifications compared to any potential newcomer. Regarding his stance against conscription, he maintained that his opposition stemmed from honest conviction.

=== Opposition candidates ===
None of the Pro-Administration candidates whom Brown anticipated stood for the office, but he was not without opposition. The Atlanta Gazette hoisted the banner of Joshua Y. Hill of Madison and the Southern Recorder placed Lt. Col Timothy M. Furlow of Americus in the race. Neither of these men made a formidable opponent for Brown.

Although a plantation owner, Hill bitterly opposed secession in 1861, always denying the legality of the ordinance of secession. Throughout the war, he was regarded as a reconstructionist and a Union man. Hill was in touch with William Tecumseh Sherman during the general's March to the Sea in September 1864 and during the Reconstruction period he went over to the Republican Party. He was the candidate of the old Whig-American group and the Peace Party in Georgia, becoming a rallying point for the growing faction in Northern Georgia.

Furlow emerged as the candidate appealing to those who disagreed with Hill's unionist principles and Brown's hostility to Confederate policies under Davis. In a letter consenting to his nomination, Furlow emphasized the necessity of Confederate independence, asserting that all physically capable men must serve in the army. Distinguishing himself from Brown, he stated, "If elected Governor, I shall throw no official protection around any citizen within the embrace of the Conscript Law." Brown had previously halted the draft in certain north Georgia counties in defiance of the state supreme court's support for conscription. His attempts to coerce the legislature into aligning with his anti-Richmond stance left him potentially susceptible on this issue.

=== Plan ===
During this time there was no run-off system like there is today. If no candidate could receive a majority vote then the election would be thrown into the Georgia General Assembly. It just so happened that the General Assembly was majority Anti-Brown and so it was hoped that Furlow would get enough loyal and state-rights Democratic votes to prevent Brown from receiving a majority over him and Hill.

The newspapers opposing Brown displayed even greater animosity than in the previous election, launching attacks on every vulnerable aspect of his character. Accusations against Brown ranged from demagoguery and self-serving behavior to religious hypocrisy, dishonesty, and disloyalty to the Confederacy. Critics highlighted Brown's tactic of portraying himself as "conscripted" into seeking reelection, reminiscent of his actions in 1861, and argued that his announcement of not actively pursuing the office was merely a ploy to elicit public support for a "call to service." He was labelled as an "oily flatterer of the masses" and of ever trying to ingratiate himself with the masses. Brown's supporters harped on the idea that the office should be conferred upon the man and should not be sought. It was pointed out by Brown's enemies that such an argument gave Brown an unfair advantage because he was already in office.

Just like the last election, his opponents were enraged at the idea of office not being changed in times of war and often referred to him as "Joseph I."

== General election ==
On election day, October 5, 1863, Independent Democrat nominee Joseph E. Brown won re-election by a margin of 8,262 votes against Unionist nominee Joshua Hill and Pro-Administration nominee Lt. Col Timothy Furlow, thereby becoming the first person to hold the office of Governor of Georgia for four terms. Brown was sworn in for his fourth and final term on January 3, 1864.

While Hill polled his greatest vote from the old Union element in the mountainous counties of the North and was supported by hard-line anti-confederate Unionists, it was in no means a reconstruction vote. According to James Bass, he polled the tired-of-the-war vote plus a certain conservative vote. Benjamin Harvey Hill, though of no family relation, supported him as did many old Whigs and Americans.

It was obvious that Furlow failed to carry the full strength of the so-called loyal vote, failing to win a single county north of the capital.

For what Brown lost to Hill in north Georgia, he had made more than a corresponding gain in central and south Georgia.

Georgia gubernatorial election, 1863
Party	Candidate	Votes	%
Independent Democrat	Joseph E. Brown (incumbent)	36,558	56.37
Peace Party	Joshua Hill	18,272	28.17
Democratic	Timothy Furlow	10,024	15.46
Total votes		64,854	100

== Works cited ==
- Bass, James (1933). "The Georgia Gubernatorial Elections of 1861 and 1863". The Georgia Historical Quarterly. 17 (3): 167–188. JSTOR 40576265.
- Sarris, Jonathan (2006). A Separate Civil War: Communities in Conflict in the Mountain South. University of Virginia Press. ISBN 9780813925554.
- Sacher, John (2021). Confederate Conscription and the Struggle for Southern Soldiers. LSU Press. ISBN 9780807176542.
- Baggett, James (2004). The Scalawags: Southern Dissenters in the Civil War and Reconstruction. LSU Press. ISBN 9780807130148.
- Dubin, Michael (2014). United States Gubernatorial Elections, 1861–1911: The Official Results by State and County. McFarland, Incorporated, Publishers. ISBN 9780786456468.
