= 1813 Georgia gubernatorial election =

- November 5, 1813
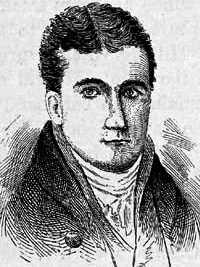

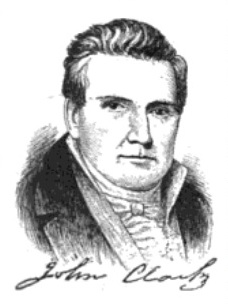
Nominee	Peter Early	John Clark
Party	Democratic-Republican	Democratic-Republican
Popular vote	66	48
Percentage	55.93%	40.68%
Governor before election
David Brydie Mitchell
Democratic-Republican
Elected Governor
Peter Early
Democratic-Republican

The 1813 Georgia gubernatorial election was held on November 5, 1813, in order to elect the Governor of Georgia. Democratic-Republican candidate and former member of the U.S. House of Representatives from Georgia's at-large congressional district Peter Early defeated fellow Democratic-Republican candidate John Clark in a Georgia General Assembly vote.

== General election ==
On election day, November 5, 1813, Democratic-Republican candidate Peter Early won the election against his opponent fellow Democratic-Republican candidate John Clark. Early was sworn in as the 28th Governor of Georgia on November 5, 1813.

=== Results ===
Georgia gubernatorial election, 1813
Party	Candidate	Votes	%
Democratic-Republican	Peter Early	66	55.93
Democratic-Republican	John Clark	48	40.68
	Nicholas Long	4	3.39
Total votes		118	100.00
Democratic-Republican hold			
