= 1799 Georgia gubernatorial election =

- November 8, 1799
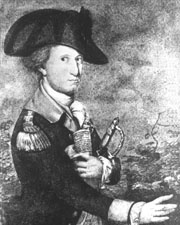
Nominee	James Jackson
Party	Democratic-Republican
Popular vote	53
Percentage	79.10%
Governor before election
James Jackson
Democratic-Republican
Elected Governor
James Jackson
Democratic-Republican

The 1799 Georgia gubernatorial election was held on November 8, 1799, in order to elect the governor of Georgia. Incumbent Democratic-Republican governor James Jackson won re-election in a Georgia General Assembly vote as he ran unopposed.

== General election ==
On election day, November 8, 1799, incumbent Democratic-Republican governor James Jackson won re-election as he ran unopposed. Jackson was sworn in for his second term on November 9, 1799.

=== Results ===
Georgia gubernatorial election, 1799
Party	Candidate	Votes	%
Democratic-Republican	James Jackson (incumbent)	53	79.10
	Scattering	14	20.90
Total votes		67	100.00
Democratic-Republican hold			
