= 1817 Georgia gubernatorial election =

- November 10, 1817

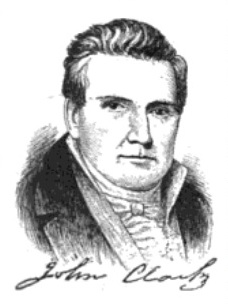
| Nominee | William Rabun | John Clark |
| Party | Democratic-Republican | Democratic-Republican |
| Popular vote | 62 | 57 |
| Percentage | 52.10% | 47.90% |
Governor before election
William Rabun (Acting)
Democratic-Republican
Elected Governor
William Rabun
Democratic-Republican

The 1817 Georgia gubernatorial election was held on November 10, 1817, in order to elect the Governor of Georgia. Democratic-Republican candidate and incumbent acting Governor William Rabun defeated fellow Democratic-Republican candidate John Clark in a Georgia General Assembly vote.

== General election ==
On election day, November 10, 1817, Democratic-Republican candidate William Rabun won the election against his opponent fellow Democratic-Republican candidate John Clark. Rabun was officially sworn in as the 29th Governor of Georgia on November 10, 1817.

=== Results ===
Georgia gubernatorial election, 1817
| Party | Candidate | Votes | % |
|---|---|---|---|
| Democratic-Republican | William Rabun | 62 | 52.10 |
| Democratic-Republican | John Clark | 57 | 47.90 |
| Total votes | | 119 | 100.00 |
| Democratic-Republican hold | | | |
