= November 1789 Georgia gubernatorial election =

- November 16, 1789

Nominee	Edward Telfair	John Houston	William Pierce
Party	Democratic-Republican
Popular vote	25	20	20
Percentage	39.06%	31.25%	12.74%
Governor before election
George Walton
Democratic-Republican
Elected Governor
Edward Telfair
Democratic-Republican

The November 1789 Georgia gubernatorial election was held on November 16, 1789, in order to elect the Governor of Georgia, this was the first election held under the 1789 constitution, which lengthened terms to two years. Democratic-Republican nominee and former Governor Edward Telfair defeated candidates John Houston and William Pierce in a Georgia General Assembly vote.

== General election ==
On election day, November 16, 1789, Democratic-Republican nominee Edward Telfair won the election against his foremost opponent John Houston. Telfair was sworn in for his second term on November 17, 1789.

=== Results ===
Georgia gubernatorial election, November 1789
Party	Candidate	Votes	%
Democratic-Republican	Edward Telfair	25	39.06
	John Houston	20	31.25
	William Pierce	19	29.69
Total votes		64	100.00
Democratic-Republican hold			
