= 1896 Georgia gubernatorial election =

- October 7, 1896
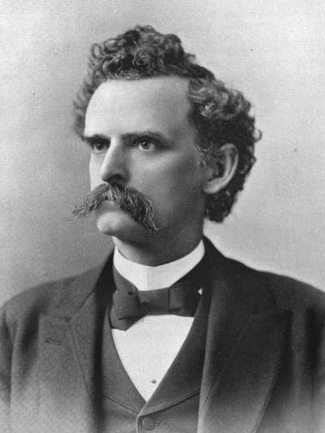

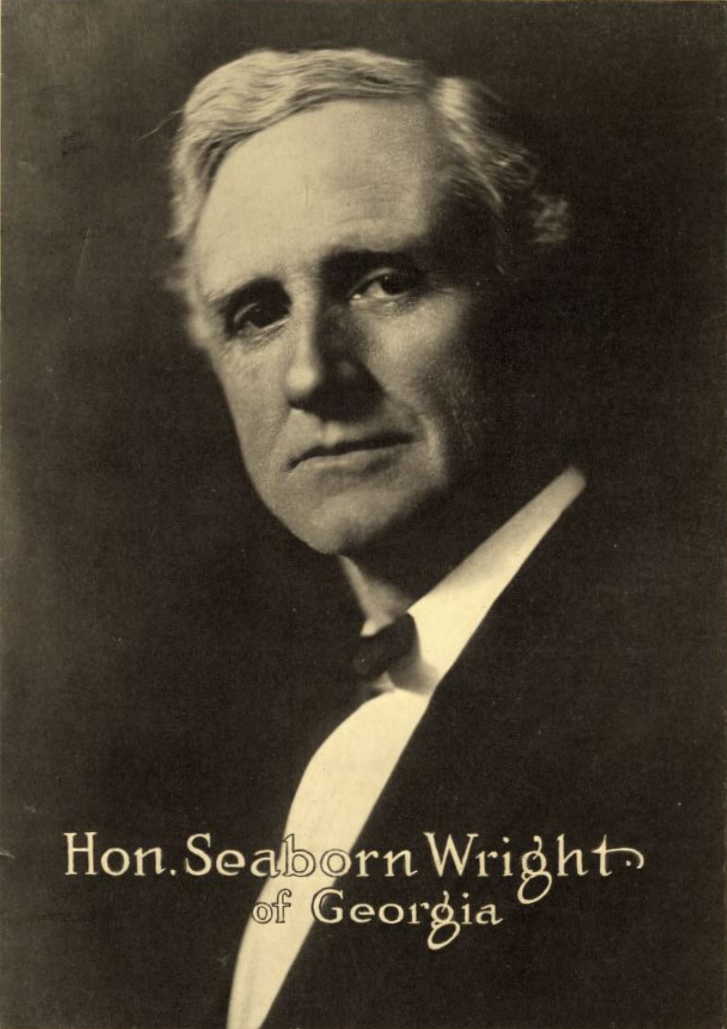
| Nominee | William Yates Atkinson | Seaborn Wright |
| Party | Democratic | Populist |
| Popular vote | 123,206 | 85,981 |
| Percentage | 58.90% | 41.10% |
- County results Atkinson: 50–60% 60–70% 70–80% 80–90% >90% Wright: 50–60% 60–70% 70–80% 80–90%
Governor before election
William Yates Atkinson
Democratic
Elected Governor
William Yates Atkinson
Democratic

The 1896 Georgia gubernatorial election was held on October 7, 1896, in order to elect the Governor of Georgia. Democratic nominee and incumbent Governor William Yates Atkinson defeated People's Party nominee Seaborn Wright.

== General election ==
On election day, October 7, 1896, Democratic nominee William Yates Atkinson won re-election with a margin of 37,225 votes against his opponent People's Party nominee Seaborn Wright, thereby holding Democratic control over the office of Governor. Atkinson was sworn in for his second term on October 29, 1896.

=== Results ===
Georgia gubernatorial election, 1896
| Party | Candidate | Votes | % |
|---|---|---|---|
| Democratic | William Yates Atkinson (incumbent) | 123,206 | 58.90 |
| Populist | Seaborn Wright | 85,981 | 41.10 |
| Total votes | | 209,187 | 100.00 |
| Democratic hold | | | |
