= List of governors of Georgia =

The governor of Georgia is the head of government of the U.S. state of Georgia and the commander-in-chief of the state's military forces. Republican Brian Kemp assumed office on January 14, 2019.

There have officially been 83 governors of the State of Georgia, including 11 who served more than one distinct term (John Houstoun, George Walton, Edward Telfair, George Mathews, Jared Irwin, David Brydie Mitchell, George R. Gilmer, Hoke Smith, Joseph Mackey Brown, John M. Slaton and Eugene Talmadge, with Herman Talmadge serving two de facto distinct terms).

The longest-serving governors are George Busbee, Joe Frank Harris, Zell Miller, Sonny Perdue and Nathan Deal, each of whom served two full four-year terms; Joseph E. Brown, governor during the Civil War, was elected four times, serving seven and a half years. The shortest term of the post-revolutionary period is that of Matthew Talbot, who served 13 days after succeeding his predecessor, who died in office. Eugene Talmadge died in December 1946 before taking office in his second distinct term, leading to a dispute in which three people claimed the office.

== Governors ==
Georgia was one of the original Thirteen Colonies and was admitted as a state on January 2, 1788. Before it declared its independence, Georgia was a colony of the Kingdom of Great Britain. It seceded from the Union on January 19, 1861, and was a founding member of the Confederate States of America on February 4, 1861. Following the end of the American Civil War, Georgia during Reconstruction was part of the Third Military District, which exerted some control over governor appointments and elections. Georgia was readmitted to the Union on July 21, 1868; again expelled from Congress on March 3, 1869; and again readmitted on July 15, 1870.

The Rules and Regulations of the Colony, drafted in 1776, provided for a president to serve a term of 6 months. A formal constitution was drafted in 1777, providing for a governor to serve a term of one year, but no more than one year out of every three. The term was lengthened to two years in 1789, but with no term limit. The 1865 constitution required governors to take four years off after serving two terms, but that was quickly changed in the 1868 constitution, which allowed four-year terms with no limits. The term length was returned to the two-year term and limit of the 1865 constitution in 1877.

The 1945 constitution changed the length of terms to four years, with governors required to take four years off before running again, and it created the office of Lieutenant Governor of Georgia, who would exercise the powers of the governor should the office become vacant. This was changed in 1983 so that the lieutenant governor fully becomes governor in that circumstance. Before the creation of the office of lieutenant governor, the president of the senate (or, before 1789, the president of the executive council) would exercise the powers of governor. The 1983 constitution also allows governors to succeed themselves once, before having to wait four years to run again. The governor and the lieutenant governor are not officially elected on the same ticket.

Governors of the State of Georgia
| No. (Note: The state says Brian Kemp is the 83rd governor; this number is derived from the Official and Statistical Register of Georgia, last published by the Office of Secretary of State in 1978. It continues the numbering from the colonial governors and omits repeat governors, thus marking Archibald Bulloch as 7th and George Busbee as 77th.) | Governor | Term in office | Party | Election | Lt. Governor (Note: The office of lieutenant governor was created in 1945, first being filled in 1947.) (Note: Lieutenant governors represented the same party as their governor unless noted.) |
|---|---|---|---|---|---|
| 7 | Archibald Bulloch (1730–1777) | January 22, 1776 – February 22, 1777 (398 days; died in office) | No parties | — (Note: The revolutionary government did not necessarily follow any schedule or term lengths, so the election year is omitted until 1781, when it becomes easier to determine.) | Office did not exist |
| 8 | Button Gwinnett (1735–1777) | March 4, 1777 – May 8, 1777 (66 days; retired) (Note: No sources specify if the governor stood for election to the following term.) | No parties | — (Note: As speaker of the provincial Congress, Gwinnett was elected by the Council of Safety to succeed Bulloch.) | Office did not exist |
| 9 | John A. Treutlen (1734–1782) | May 8, 1777 – January 10, 1778 (248 days; retired) | No parties | — | Office did not exist |
| 10 | John Houstoun (1744–1796) | January 10, 1778 – December 29, 1778 (354 days; fled from capture) (Note: The date given is the capture of Savannah, where the New Georgia Encyclopedia says his last official act as governor was to flee.) | No parties | — | Office did not exist |
| — | Competing governments | December 29, 1778 – August 6, 1779 (221 days) | Government in chaos after fall of Savannah (Note: The capture of Savannah threw the government into disarray and exile, and records are scarce as to dates and leadership. William Glascock (elected January 21, 1779) and Seth John Cuthbert (elected July 24, 1779), while often included in lists of governors, are omitted from the official state register. A school pamphlet from 1977 notes, "This confusing situation resulted in a number of radical Whigs, mainly from Wilkes County, organizing a second government with George Walton as governor and Glascock as speaker of the assembly. ... As a result of this makeshift election, there were two Whig governments plus the restored loyalist government.") | | Office did not exist |
| 11 | John Wereat (d. 1799) | August 6, 1779 – November 1779 (~100 days; retired) | No parties | — | Office did not exist |
| 12 | George Walton (d. 1804) | November 1779 – January 4, 1780 (~50 days; retired) | No parties | — | Office did not exist |
| 13 | Richard Howly (1740–1784) | January 4, 1780 – February 5, 1780 (33 days; retired) (Note: Howly had also been elected as a delegate to the Continental Congress, and the Council voted on February 5 that he must take that seat; it is unclear if this means he was removed or he resigned.) | No parties | — | Office did not exist |
| — | George Wells (d. 1780) | February 5, 1780 – February 16, 1780 (12 days; died in office) (Note: George Wells succeeded Howly, but was killed in a duel on February 16, 1780; he is omitted from nearly every list of governors, including the official register.) | No parties | — | Office did not exist |
| 14 | Stephen Heard (Note: Some sources say Myrick Davies served as governor in August 1780, but he is omitted from the official state register and it is unknown if this was in an acting fashion.) (1740–1815) | February 18, 1780 (Note: The official register says Heard took office on February 18, 1870; an article from 1967 says Humphrey Wells was elected governor on February 16, but declined two days later. Other sources, including the New Georgia Encyclopedia, say Heard did not take office until May 24.) – August 18, 1781 (548 days; retired) | No parties | — | Office did not exist |
| 15 | Nathan Brownson (1742–1796) | August 18, 1781 – January 3, 1782 (139 days; term-limited) (Note: Under the 1777 constitution, governors were ineligible for office for more than one year out of three.) | No parties | 1781 | Office did not exist |
| 16 | John Martin (d. 1786) | January 3, 1782 – January 8, 1783 (371 days; term-limited) | No parties | 1782 | Office did not exist |
| 17 | Lyman Hall (1724–1790) | January 8, 1783 – January 9, 1784 (367 days; term-limited) | No parties | 1783 | Office did not exist |
| 10 | John Houstoun (1744–1796) | January 9, 1784 – January 6, 1785 (364 days; term-limited) | No parties | 1784 | Office did not exist |
| 18 | Samuel Elbert (1740–1788) | January 6, 1785 – January 9, 1786 (369 days; term-limited) | No parties | 1785 | Office did not exist |
| 19 | Edward Telfair (1735–1807) | January 9, 1786 – January 9, 1787 (366 days; term-limited) | No parties | 1786 | Office did not exist |
| 20 | George Mathews (1739–1812) | January 9, 1787 – January 26, 1788 (383 days; term-limited) | No parties | 1787 | Office did not exist |
| 21 | George Handley (1752–1793) | January 26, 1788 – January 7, 1789 (348 days; term-limited) | No parties | 1788 (Note: James Jackson was elected in 1788, but declined the position, citing inexperience.) | Office did not exist |
| 12 | George Walton (d. 1804) | January 7, 1789 – November 9, 1789 (307 days; term-limited) (Note: Sobel & Raimo note that Walton was term-limited under the 1777 constitution; it is unclear if the provisions of that, or the 1789 constitution, would have applied to Walton.) | Democratic- Republican | ^{Jan.}1789 | Office did not exist |
| 19 | Edward Telfair (1735–1807) | November 9, 1789 – November 7, 1793 (1460 days; lost election) | Democratic- Republican | ^{Nov.}1789 (Note: First term under the 1789 constitution, which lengthened terms to two years.) | Office did not exist |
| 19 | Edward Telfair (1735–1807) | November 9, 1789 – November 7, 1793 (1460 days; lost election) | Democratic- Republican | 1791 | Office did not exist |
| 20 | George Mathews (1739–1812) | November 7, 1793 – January 15, 1796 (800 days; retired) | Democratic- Republican | 1793 | Office did not exist |
| 22 | Jared Irwin (1750–1818) | January 15, 1796 – January 12, 1798 (729 days; retired) | Democratic- Republican | 1795 | Office did not exist |
| 23 | James Jackson (1757–1806) | January 12, 1798 – March 3, 1801 (1146 days; resigned) (Note: Jackson resigned, having been elected to the United States Senate.) | Democratic- Republican | 1797 | Office did not exist |
| 23 | James Jackson (1757–1806) | January 12, 1798 – March 3, 1801 (1146 days; resigned) | Democratic- Republican | 1799 | Office did not exist |
| 24 | David Emanuel (1744–1808) | March 3, 1801 – November 7, 1801 (250 days; retired) | Democratic- Republican | Succeeded from president of the Senate | Office did not exist |
| 25 | Josiah Tattnall (d. 1803) | November 7, 1801 – November 4, 1802 (363 days; resigned) (Note: Tattnall resigned due to declining health.) | Democratic- Republican | 1801 | Office did not exist |
| 26 | John Milledge (1757–1818) | November 4, 1802 – September 23, 1806 (1420 days; resigned) (Note: Milledge resigned, having been elected to the United States Senate.) | Democratic- Republican | 1802 (special) (Note: Special election for the remainder of Josiah Tattnall's term) | Office did not exist |
| 26 | John Milledge (1757–1818) | November 4, 1802 – September 23, 1806 (1420 days; resigned) | Democratic- Republican | 1803 | Office did not exist |
| 26 | John Milledge (1757–1818) | November 4, 1802 – September 23, 1806 (1420 days; resigned) | Democratic- Republican | 1805 | Office did not exist |
| 22 | Jared Irwin (1750–1818) | September 23, 1806 – November 10, 1809 (1145 days; lost election) | Democratic- Republican | Succeeded from president of the Senate | Office did not exist |
| 22 | Jared Irwin (1750–1818) | September 23, 1806 – November 10, 1809 (1145 days; lost election) | Democratic- Republican | 1807 | Office did not exist |
| 27 | David Brydie Mitchell (1766–1837) | November 10, 1809 – November 5, 1813 (1457 days; retired) | Democratic- Republican | 1809 | Office did not exist |
| 27 | David Brydie Mitchell (1766–1837) | November 10, 1809 – November 5, 1813 (1457 days; retired) | Democratic- Republican | 1811 | Office did not exist |
| 28 | Peter Early (1773–1817) | November 5, 1813 – November 10, 1815 (736 days; lost election) | Democratic- Republican | 1813 | Office did not exist |
| 27 | David Brydie Mitchell (1766–1837) | November 10, 1815 – March 4, 1817 (481 days; resigned) (Note: Mitchell resigned to be appointed agent to the Creek Indians.) | Democratic- Republican | 1815 | Office did not exist |
| 29 | William Rabun (1771–1819) | March 4, 1817 – October 24, 1819 (965 days; died in office) | Democratic- Republican | Succeeded from president of the Senate | Office did not exist |
| 29 | William Rabun (1771–1819) | March 4, 1817 – October 24, 1819 (965 days; died in office) | Democratic- Republican | 1817 | Office did not exist |
| 30 | Matthew Talbot (1767–1827) | October 24, 1819 – November 5, 1819 (13 days; retired) | Democratic- Republican | Succeeded from president of the Senate | Office did not exist |
| 31 | John Clark (1766–1832) | November 5, 1819 – November 7, 1823 (1464 days; retired) | Democratic- Republican | 1819 | Office did not exist |
| 31 | John Clark (1766–1832) | November 5, 1819 – November 7, 1823 (1464 days; retired) | Democratic- Republican | 1821 | Office did not exist |
| 32 | George Troup (1780–1856) | November 7, 1823 – November 7, 1827 (1462 days; retired) | Troup Democratic- Republican | 1823 | Office did not exist |
| 32 | George Troup (1780–1856) | November 7, 1823 – November 7, 1827 (1462 days; retired) | Troup Democratic- Republican | 1825 | Office did not exist |
| 33 | John Forsyth (1780–1841) | November 7, 1827 – November 4, 1829 (729 days; retired) (Note: Forsyth was instead elected to the United States Senate.) | Troup Democratic- Republican | 1827 | Office did not exist |
| 34 | George R. Gilmer (1790–1859) | November 4, 1829 – November 9, 1831 (736 days; lost election) | Troup Democratic- Republican | 1829 | Office did not exist |
| 35 | Wilson Lumpkin (1783–1870) | November 9, 1831 – November 4, 1835 (1457 days; retired) | Union (Democratic) | 1831 | Office did not exist |
| 35 | Wilson Lumpkin (1783–1870) | November 9, 1831 – November 4, 1835 (1457 days; retired) | Union (Democratic) | 1833 | Office did not exist |
| 36 | William Schley (1786–1858) | November 4, 1835 – November 8, 1837 (736 days; lost election) | Union (Democratic) | 1835 | Office did not exist |
| 34 | George R. Gilmer (1790–1859) | November 8, 1837 – November 6, 1839 (729 days; retired) | State Rights (Whig) | 1837 | Office did not exist |
| 37 | Charles James McDonald (1793–1860) | November 6, 1839 – November 8, 1843 (1464 days; retired) | Union (Democratic) | 1839 | Office did not exist |
| 37 | Charles James McDonald (1793–1860) | November 6, 1839 – November 8, 1843 (1464 days; retired) | Union (Democratic) | 1841 | Office did not exist |
| 38 | George W. Crawford (1798–1872) | November 8, 1843 – November 3, 1847 (1457 days; retired) | Whig | 1843 | Office did not exist |
| 38 | George W. Crawford (1798–1872) | November 8, 1843 – November 3, 1847 (1457 days; retired) | Whig | 1845 | Office did not exist |
| 39 | George W. Towns (1801–1854) | November 3, 1847 – November 5, 1851 (1464 days; retired) | Democratic | 1847 | Office did not exist |
| 39 | George W. Towns (1801–1854) | November 3, 1847 – November 5, 1851 (1464 days; retired) | Democratic | 1849 | Office did not exist |
| 40 | Howell Cobb (1815–1868) | November 5, 1851 – November 9, 1853 (736 days; retired) | Constitutional; Union (Note: Not to be confused with the 1860s Constitutional Union Party, the Georgia Constitutional Union Party was a brief merger of Southern Unionist Democrats and Whigs during the early 1850s.) | 1851 | Office did not exist |
| 41 | Herschel V. Johnson (1812–1880) | November 9, 1853 – November 6, 1857 (1459 days; retired) | Democratic | 1853 | Office did not exist |
| 41 | Herschel V. Johnson (1812–1880) | November 9, 1853 – November 6, 1857 (1459 days; retired) | Democratic | 1855 | Office did not exist |
| 42 | Joseph E. Brown (1821–1894) | November 6, 1857 – June 17, 1865 (2781 days; resigned) (Note: Brown was arrested by Union forces on May 9, 1865, and resigned after he was released.) | Democratic | 1857 | Office did not exist |
| 42 | Joseph E. Brown (1821–1894) | November 6, 1857 – June 17, 1865 (2781 days; resigned) | Democratic | 1859 | Office did not exist |
| 42 | Joseph E. Brown (1821–1894) | November 6, 1857 – June 17, 1865 (2781 days; resigned) | Democratic | 1861 | Office did not exist |
| 42 | Joseph E. Brown (1821–1894) | November 6, 1857 – June 17, 1865 (2781 days; resigned) | Democratic | 1863 | Office did not exist |
| 43 | James Johnson (1811–1891) | June 17, 1865 – December 19, 1865 (186 days; retired) (Note: Johnson left office on December 19, five days after his successor was sworn in.) | Provisional governor appointed by President | | Office did not exist |
| 44 | Charles J. Jenkins (1805–1883) | December 14, 1865 – January 13, 1868 (761 days; removed) (Note: Jenkins was removed from office by the military because he refused to allow state funds to be used for a racially integrated state constitutional convention; the state was still under military occupation during Reconstruction.) | Democratic | 1865 | Office did not exist |
| 45 | Thomas H. Ruger (1833–1907) | January 13, 1868 – July 4, 1868 (174 days; state readmitted) | Military occupation (Note: Provisional governor appointed by General George Meade) | | Office did not exist |
| 46 | Rufus Bullock (1834–1907) | July 4, 1868 (Note: Bullock was appointed governor on July 4 by General George Meade to replace Ruger, who was being removed; however, Bullock had already won the election, and would be formally inaugurated into the post on July 21.) – October 30, 1871 (1214 days; resigned) (Note: Bullock resigned and fled the state to avoid impeachment; he was arrested in 1876 and found not guilty of embezzlement. Some sources state Bullock resigned on October 23, but that is when he secretly submitted his resignation; it did not take effect until October 30.) | Republican | 1868 (Note: First term under the 1868 constitution, which lengthened terms to four years.) | Office did not exist |
| 47 | Benjamin F. Conley (1815–1886) | October 30, 1871 – January 12, 1872 (75 days; retired) | Republican | President of the Senate acting | Office did not exist |
| 48 | James Milton Smith (1823–1890) | January 12, 1872 – January 12, 1877 (1828 days; retired) | Democratic | 1871 (special) (Note: Special election for the remainder of Rufus Bullock's term) | Office did not exist |
| 48 | James Milton Smith (1823–1890) | January 12, 1872 – January 12, 1877 (1828 days; retired) | Democratic | 1872 | Office did not exist |
| 49 | Alfred H. Colquitt (1824–1894) | January 12, 1877 – November 4, 1882 (2123 days; retired) | Democratic | 1876 | Office did not exist |
| 49 | Alfred H. Colquitt (1824–1894) | January 12, 1877 – November 4, 1882 (2123 days; retired) | Democratic | 1880 (Note: First term under the 1877 constitution, which shortened terms to two years.) | Office did not exist |
| 50 | Alexander H. Stephens (1812–1883) | November 4, 1882 – March 4, 1883 (121 days; died in office) | Democratic | 1882 | Office did not exist |
| 51 | James S. Boynton (1833–1902) | March 4, 1883 (Note: Stephens died on March 4, and Boynton was formally sworn in on March 5.) – May 10, 1883 (68 days; lost nomination) | Democratic | President of the Senate acting | Office did not exist |
| 52 | Henry Dickerson McDaniel (1836–1926) | May 10, 1883 – November 9, 1886 (1280 days; retired) (Note: McDaniel's first term was shortened, so it is not known if he can be considered term-limited.) | Democratic | 1883 (special) (Note: Special election for the remainder of Alexander Stephens' term) | Office did not exist |
| 52 | Henry Dickerson McDaniel (1836–1926) | May 10, 1883 – November 9, 1886 (1280 days; retired) | Democratic | 1884 | Office did not exist |
| 53 | John B. Gordon (1832–1904) | November 9, 1886 – November 8, 1890 (1461 days; term-limited) (Note: Gordon, being term-limited, (Note: Under the 1877 constitution, governors were ineligible for reelection until four years after the expiration of their second term.) had already been elected to the United States Senate when his term ended.) | Democratic | 1886 | Office did not exist |
| 53 | John B. Gordon (1832–1904) | November 9, 1886 – November 8, 1890 (1461 days; term-limited) | Democratic | 1888 | Office did not exist |
| 54 | William J. Northen (1835–1913) | November 8, 1890 – October 27, 1894 (1450 days; term-limited) | Democratic | 1890 | Office did not exist |
| 54 | William J. Northen (1835–1913) | November 8, 1890 – October 27, 1894 (1450 days; term-limited) | Democratic | 1892 | Office did not exist |
| 55 | William Yates Atkinson (1854–1899) | October 27, 1894 – October 29, 1898 (1464 days; term-limited) | Democratic | 1894 | Office did not exist |
| 55 | William Yates Atkinson (1854–1899) | October 27, 1894 – October 29, 1898 (1464 days; term-limited) | Democratic | 1896 | Office did not exist |
| 56 | Allen D. Candler (1834–1910) | October 29, 1898 – October 25, 1902 (1457 days; term-limited) | Democratic | 1898 | Office did not exist |
| 56 | Allen D. Candler (1834–1910) | October 29, 1898 – October 25, 1902 (1457 days; term-limited) | Democratic | 1900 | Office did not exist |
| 57 | Joseph M. Terrell (1861–1912) | October 25, 1902 – June 29, 1907 (1709 days; term-limited) | Democratic | 1902 | Office did not exist |
| 57 | Joseph M. Terrell (1861–1912) | October 25, 1902 – June 29, 1907 (1709 days; term-limited) | Democratic | 1904 (Note: The start of a gubernatorial term has always been set by the legislature, rather than the constitution; it appears the start of this term changed from the last Saturday in October to the last Saturday in June, lengthening it by eight months.) | Office did not exist |
| 58 | Hoke Smith (1855–1931) | June 29, 1907 – June 26, 1909 (729 days; lost nomination) | Democratic | 1906 | Office did not exist |
| 59 | Joseph Mackey Brown (1851–1932) | June 26, 1909 – July 1, 1911 (736 days; lost election) (Note: Brown lost the Democratic nomination to Hoke Smith, and ran as an independent.) | Democratic | 1908 | Office did not exist |
| 58 | Hoke Smith (1855–1931) | July 1, 1911 – November 15, 1911 (138 days; resigned) (Note: Smith resigned, having been elected to the United States Senate.) | Democratic | 1910 | Office did not exist |
| 60 | John M. Slaton (1866–1955) | November 15, 1911 (Note: Smith resigned on November 15, and Slaton was sworn in on November 16; at least one contemporary news source regarded this as a vacancy rather than an automatic succession.) – January 25, 1912 (72 days; retired) | Democratic | President of the Senate acting | Office did not exist |
| 59 | Joseph Mackey Brown (1851–1932) | January 25, 1912 – June 28, 1913 (521 days; retired) | Democratic | ^{Jan.}1912 (special) (Note: Special election for the remainder of Hoke Smith's term) | Office did not exist |
| 60 | John M. Slaton (1866–1955) | June 28, 1913 – June 26, 1915 (729 days; retired) (Note: Slaton instead ran unsuccessfully for the Democratic nomination for the United States Senate.) | Democratic | ^{Oct.}1912 | Office did not exist |
| 61 | Nathaniel Edwin Harris (1846–1929) | June 26, 1915 – June 30, 1917 (736 days; lost nomination) | Democratic | 1914 | Office did not exist |
| 62 | Hugh Dorsey (1871–1948) | June 30, 1917 – June 25, 1921 (1457 days; term-limited) | Democratic | 1916 | Office did not exist |
| 62 | Hugh Dorsey (1871–1948) | June 30, 1917 – June 25, 1921 (1457 days; term-limited) | Democratic | 1918 | Office did not exist |
| 63 | Thomas W. Hardwick (1872–1944) | June 25, 1921 – June 30, 1923 (736 days; lost nomination) | Democratic | 1920 | Office did not exist |
| 64 | Clifford Walker (1877–1954) | June 30, 1923 – June 25, 1927 (1457 days; term-limited) | Democratic | 1922 | Office did not exist |
| 64 | Clifford Walker (1877–1954) | June 30, 1923 – June 25, 1927 (1457 days; term-limited) | Democratic | 1924 | Office did not exist |
| 65 | Lamartine Griffin Hardman (1856–1937) | June 25, 1927 – June 27, 1931 (1464 days; term-limited) | Democratic | 1926 | Office did not exist |
| 65 | Lamartine Griffin Hardman (1856–1937) | June 25, 1927 – June 27, 1931 (1464 days; term-limited) | Democratic | 1928 | Office did not exist |
| 66 | Richard Russell Jr. (1897–1971) | June 27, 1931 – January 10, 1933 (564 days; retired) (Note: Russell was instead elected to the United States Senate.) | Democratic | 1930 (Note: The start of the term changed from the last Saturday in June to the second Tuesday in January, shortening this term by five months.) | Office did not exist |
| 67 | Eugene Talmadge (1884–1946) | January 10, 1933 – January 12, 1937 (1464 days; term-limited) (Note: Talmadge, being term-limited, had already lost the Democratic nomination for the United States Senate when his term ended.) | Democratic | 1932 | Office did not exist |
| 67 | Eugene Talmadge (1884–1946) | January 10, 1933 – January 12, 1937 (1464 days; term-limited) | Democratic | 1934 | Office did not exist |
| 68 | Eurith D. Rivers (1895–1967) | January 12, 1937 – January 14, 1941 (1464 days; term-limited) | Democratic | 1936 | Office did not exist |
| 68 | Eurith D. Rivers (1895–1967) | January 12, 1937 – January 14, 1941 (1464 days; term-limited) | Democratic | 1938 | Office did not exist |
| 67 | Eugene Talmadge (1884–1946) | January 14, 1941 – January 12, 1943 (729 days; lost nomination) | Democratic | 1940 | Office did not exist |
| 69 | Ellis Arnall (1907–1992) | January 12, 1943 – January 14, 1947 (1464 days; term-limited) (Note: Under the 1945 constitution, governors were ineligible for reelection until the expiration of four years from the end of their term.) | Democratic | 1942 (Note: First term under a 1941 amendment to the constitution which lengthened terms to four years.) | Office did not exist |
| — | Eugene Talmadge (1884–1946) | Died before taking office | Democratic | 1946 (Note: Eugene Talmadge was elected to a third term in 1946, but died before taking office. Ellis Arnall, governor at the time, claimed the office, as did Lieutenant Governor Melvin Thompson. The state legislature chose Eugene Talmadge's son, Herman Talmadge, to be governor, but during what came to be called the three governors controversy, the state supreme court declared this unconstitutional and declared Thompson rightful governor, and Talmadge stepped down after 67 days. Talmadge later defeated Thompson in a special election.) | Melvin E. Thompson |
| — | Herman Talmadge (1913–2002) | January 14, 1947 – March 19, 1947 (65 days; removed) | Democratic | 1946 | Melvin E. Thompson |
| 70 | Melvin E. Thompson (1903–1980) | March 19, 1947 – November 17, 1948 (610 days; lost nomination) | Democratic | Succeeded from lieutenant governor | Vacant |
| 71 | Herman Talmadge (1913–2002) | November 17, 1948 – January 11, 1955 (2247 days; term-limited) | Democratic | 1948 (special) | Marvin Griffin |
| 71 | Herman Talmadge (1913–2002) | November 17, 1948 – January 11, 1955 (2247 days; term-limited) | Democratic | 1950 | Marvin Griffin |
| 72 | Marvin Griffin (1907–1982) | January 11, 1955 – January 13, 1959 (1464 days; term-limited) | Democratic | 1954 | Ernest Vandiver |
| 73 | Ernest Vandiver (1918–2005) | January 13, 1959 – January 15, 1963 (1464 days; term-limited) | Democratic | 1958 | Garland T. Byrd |
| 74 | Carl Sanders (1925–2014) | January 15, 1963 – January 11, 1967 (1458 days; term-limited) | Democratic | 1962 | Peter Zack Geer |
| 75 | Lester Maddox (1915–2003) | January 11, 1967 – January 12, 1971 (1463 days; term-limited) (Note: Maddox, being term-limited, had already been elected Lieutenant Governor of Georgia when his term ended.) | Democratic | 1966 | George T. Smith |
| 76 | Jimmy Carter (1924–2024) | January 12, 1971 – January 14, 1975 (1464 days; term-limited) | Democratic | 1970 | Lester Maddox |
| 77 | George Busbee (1927–2004) | January 14, 1975 – January 11, 1983 (2920 days; term-limited) (Note: Under the 1976 constitution, governors were ineligible to succeed themselves, or to hold the office until the expiration of four years from the end of their term.) | Democratic | 1974 | Zell Miller |
| 77 | George Busbee (1927–2004) | January 14, 1975 – January 11, 1983 (2920 days; term-limited) | Democratic | 1978 | Zell Miller |
| 78 | Joe Frank Harris (b. 1936) | January 11, 1983 – January 14, 1991 (2926 days; term-limited) (Note: Under the 1983 constitution, those governors who have succeeded themselves are ineligible to be elected to the office four years after the end of their term.) | Democratic | 1982 | Zell Miller |
| 78 | Joe Frank Harris (b. 1936) | January 11, 1983 – January 14, 1991 (2926 days; term-limited) | Democratic | 1986 | Zell Miller |
| 79 | Zell Miller (1932–2018) | January 14, 1991 – January 11, 1999 (2920 days; term-limited) | Democratic | 1990 | Pierre Howard |
| 79 | Zell Miller (1932–2018) | January 14, 1991 – January 11, 1999 (2920 days; term-limited) | Democratic | 1994 | Pierre Howard |
| 80 | Roy Barnes (b. 1948) | January 11, 1999 – January 13, 2003 (1464 days; lost election) | Democratic | 1998 | Mark Taylor (Note: Represented the Democratic Party) |
| 81 | Sonny Perdue (b. 1946) | January 13, 2003 – January 10, 2011 (2920 days; term-limited) | Republican | 2002 | Mark Taylor |
| 81 | Sonny Perdue (b. 1946) | January 13, 2003 – January 10, 2011 (2920 days; term-limited) | Republican | 2006 | Casey Cagle |
| 82 | Nathan Deal (b. 1942) | January 10, 2011 – January 14, 2019 (2927 days; term-limited) | Republican | 2010 | Casey Cagle |
| 82 | Nathan Deal (b. 1942) | January 10, 2011 – January 14, 2019 (2927 days; term-limited) | Republican | 2014 | Casey Cagle |
| 83 | Brian Kemp (b. 1963) | January 14, 2019 – Incumbent (Note: Kemp's second term began on January 12, 2023, and will expire on January 11, 2027; he is term-limited.) (in office 2870 days) | Republican | 2018 | Geoff Duncan |
| 83 | Brian Kemp (b. 1963) | January 14, 2019 – Incumbent (in office 2870 days) | Republican | 2022 | Burt Jones |
| 84 | Keisha Lance Bottoms (b. 1970) | Governor-elect takes office January 11, 2027 | Democratic | 2026 | Josh McLaurin |

== See also ==
- Gubernatorial lines of succession in the United States § Georgia
- First ladies of Georgia
- Lieutenant Governor of Georgia
- List of colonial governors of Georgia
- List of Georgia state legislatures

== Sources ==
- "Former Georgia Governors". National Governors Association.
- "Georgia Constitution". State Democracy Research Initiative. University of Wisconsin Law School.
- Dubin, Michael J. (2003). United States Gubernatorial Elections, 1776–1860: The Official Results by State and County. McFarland. ISBN 0-7864-1439-1 – via Internet Archive.
- Glashan, Roy R. (1979). American Governors and Gubernatorial Elections, 1775-1978. Meckler Books. ISBN 0-7201-1511-6 – via Internet Archive.
- Kallenbach, Joseph E.; Kallenbach, Jessamine S. (1977). American State Governors, 1776-1976. Oceana Publications. ISBN 978-0-379-00665-0 – via Internet Archive.
- Mullaney, Marie Marmo (1994). Biographical Directory of the Governors of the United States, 1988–1994. Greenwood Publishing Group. ISBN 0-313-28312-5 – via Internet Archive.
- Sobel, Robert; Raimo, John (1978). Biographical Directory of the Governors of the United States, 1789-1978. Vol. 1. Meckler Books. ISBN 0-930466-01-2 – via Internet Archive.
- Thorpe, Francis Newton, ed. (1909). The Federal and State Constitutions, Colonial Charters, and Other Organic Laws of the States, Territories, and Colonies Now or Heretofore Forming the United States of America. Vol. 2. United States Government Publishing Office – via Internet Archive.
