= Francis Willis (politician) =

American politician

Member of the U.S. House of Representatives from Georgia's 3rd district
- In office March 4, 1791 - March 3, 1793
- Preceded by: George Mathews

Personal details
- Born: January 5, 1745 Frederick County, Virginia Colony, British America
- Died: January 25, 1829 (aged 84) Maury County, Tennessee, U.S.

Francis Willis (January 5, 1745 – January 25, 1829) was a United States representative from the state of Georgia.

== Biography ==
Willis was born in Frederick County in the Virginia Colony. He served as captain and colonel in the Revolutionary War in 1777 and 1778 in Grayson's Regiment under Colonel William Grayson.

He moved to Wilkes County, Georgia in 1784 and was elected to the United States House of Representatives as an at-large representative from Georgia. He served one term during the 2nd United States Congress from March 4, 1791, until March 3, 1793.

After his congressional service, Willis moved to Maury County, Tennessee, and died there in 1829.

U.S. House of Representatives
Preceded by George Mathews	Member of the U.S. House of Representatives from Georgia's 3rd congressional district March 4, 1791 – March 3, 1793	Succeeded by At Large districts
