= Trans-Oconee Republic =

American polity

Coordinates: 32.123°N 82.681°W

- 1794–1794
- Status: Unrecognized state
- Common languages: English (de facto)
- Government: Republic
- General
  - 1794: Elijah Clarke
- Historical era: American Revolution
  - Established: May 1794
  - Republic dissolved: September 1794
| Preceded by | Succeeded by |
| United States | United States |
- Today part of: United States: Georgia

The Trans-Oconee Republic was a short-lived, independent state west of the Oconee River (in the state of Georgia). Established by General Elijah Clarke in May 1794, it was an attempt to head off the new Federal government's ceding of lands claimed by Georgia back to the Creek. In September 1794, state and federal troops forced Clarke and his followers to surrender and leave the settlements. The armed forces destroyed the houses and forts.

== Background ==
In February 1794, General Elijah Clarke, a popular veteran of the American Revolutionary War, resigned his current commission in the Georgia state militia in order to lead an expedition against the East Florida colony. Clarke had become involved in a French-supported scheme to invade East Florida, which was then controlled by the Kingdom of Spain.

When the invasion failed to develop, General Clarke and several hundred of his followers moved instead to establish an independent state west of the Oconee River —on hunting grounds reserved by the federal Treaty of New York (1790) exclusively for the Creek Indians. Georgia had not been consulted on the original treaty —which included giving titled lands back to the Creek. Many European American settlers in Georgia resented the treaty because they saw it as limiting the possibilities for the future expansion of their state.

Clarke's frontiersmen made settlements on lands in present-day Greene, Morgan, Putnam, and Baldwin counties of Georgia. The settlers built several towns and forts over the next few months. They also wrote and ratified their own constitution, indicating the permanent intention of their endeavor. With little overt opposition from the Creek, they were taking control of the lands before the state or federal governments could react.

== Conflict with the Federal government ==
The United States government viewed Clarke's actions as a violation of the Treaty of New York, which provided recognition of Creek lands in an effort to maintain peace and guarantee their neutrality. President George Washington pressured the Georgia Governor, George Mathews, to remove the illegal settlers from the Creek lands. Mathews initially ignored the "unauthorized military expedition," because he shared the state's resentment of the treaty and was well aware of Clarke's popularity as a hero of the Revolution. He took only token measures to stop Clarke and his party, such as issuing a proclamation in July 1794 that went unenforced. It is unlikely that Mathews had enough public support to move against Clarke at that juncture, but the tide of public opinion eventually changed.

In late August, Judge George Walton issued a charge to an Augusta grand jury in which he condemned the actions of Clarke and his followers, and explained that they constituted a threat to the state and federal powers. He said Clarke and his followers were attempting to steal the western lands, "the richest jewel the state of Georgia possesses," before other Georgians had a fair chance to acquire title to them by legal state action. (Clarke had welcomed settlers to join the enterprise, intending to take control of the land from the Creek before the state and federal government could react. He had forbidden issuing large tracts of the land in the new republic to speculators or other investors who would not settle there.) In any case, Walton's charges changed public opinion to a degree that allowed the Governor to muster a sufficient force of militia to march against Clarke.

In September, 1,200 Georgia militiamen, led by General Jared Irwin acting in conjunction with federal troops stationed on the Oconee, surrounded and isolated General Clarke's fortifications. After some negotiation, Clarke agreed to surrender, provided that he and his men would not face prosecution for their actions. Clarke and his followers departed, and the militia burned down the new settlements and fortifications.

== Legacy ==
Clarke's establishment of the illegal settlements coincided with increasing interest in the state in the disposition of Georgia's western land claims, which at that time stretched as far as the Mississippi River. From 1785 on, speculators from other states had lobbied hard to encourage the sale of lands and extinguish Creek and other Indian land claims, despite their guarantee by federal treaty.

In late 1794, the Georgia General Assembly passed a bill allowing a portion of the lands west of the Oconee River, the same land which Clarke's followers had recently occupied, to be distributed among veterans of the Revolution and various Indian conflicts. A supplementary act (the Yazoo Act) attached to the bill provided for the sale of 40 million acres (160,000 km^{2}) of western land to four private land speculation firms: the Georgia Company, the Georgia-Mississippi Company, the Upper Mississippi Company, and the new Tennessee Company, persuaded the Georgia state assembly to sell more than 40,000,000 acres (160,000 km^{2}). As many of the firms' members included many political insiders, the whole enterprise was scandalous and came to be known as the Yazoo Land Fraud.
