= George Mathews (Georgia politician) =

American politician (1739–1812)

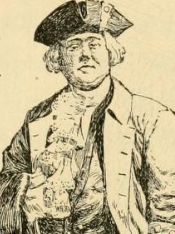
- Artist's impression of George Mathews from an 1896 book illustration.

20th Governor of Georgia
- In office November 7, 1793 – January 15, 1796
- Preceded by: Edward Telfair
- Succeeded by: Jared Irwin
- In office January 9, 1787 – January 26, 1788
- Preceded by: Edward Telfair
- Succeeded by: George Handley

Member of the U. S. House of Representatives from Georgia's 3rd district
- In office March 4, 1789 – March 3, 1791
- Preceded by: Position established
- Succeeded by: Francis Willis

Georgia General Assembly
- In office 1787

Virginia House of Burgesses
- In office Did not convene
- Preceded by: Charles Lewis
- Succeeded by: Position abolished

Personal details
- Born: August 30, 1739 Augusta County, Virginia Colony, British America
- Died: August 30, 1812 (aged 73) Augusta, Georgia, U.S.
- Resting place: St. Paul's Episcopal Church Cemetery
- Party: Federalist
- Spouses: Anne Polly Paul; Margaret Reed; Mary Carpenter
- Relations: Mathews family
- Profession: Planter, politician
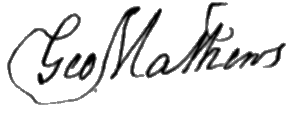
- Signature

Military service
- Allegiance: (Kingdom of Great Britain) Great Britain; United States
- Branch/service: Virginia militia Continental Army; United States Army
- Years of service: Militia: 1774; Continental Army: 1775–1783; U.S. Army: 1810–1812
- Rank: Brigadier General
- Battles/wars: Dunmore's War; Battle of Point Pleasant; American Revolutionary War; Battle of Brandywine; Battle of Germantown; Seminole Wars; Patriot War of East Florida

George Mathews (August 30, 1739 – August 30, 1812) was an American soldier and politician from the U.S. states of Virginia and Georgia. He was a brevet brigadier general in the Continental Army, the 20th governor of Georgia, a U.S. representative from Georgia, and the leading participant in the Patriot War of East Florida, which ultimately resulted in the cessation of Florida to the United States.

Born in Augusta County in the Virginia Colony, Mathews was in early life a merchant and planter. As an officer in the colonial militia, he gained statewide fame for his role in the Battle of Point Pleasant of Dunmore's War. He was afterward elected to the House of Burgesses from Augusta County, but did not attend a session. On the outbreak of the American Revolutionary War, he served as colonel of the 9th Virginia Regiment in the Continental Army. He and his entire regiment were captured on October 4, 1777, in the Battle of Germantown. Mathews spent the next four years as a prisoner of war, including two years on a British prison ship. He was brevetted brigadier general at the end of the war.

After the war, Mathews moved to the state of Georgia and was quickly elected governor of the state. He served two nonconsecutive terms, voted to ratify the United States Constitution, and served in the 1st United States Congress. His second term as governor was overshadowed by his involvement in the Yazoo Land Fraud, which led to his political downfall.

Mathews relocated to the Mississippi Territory and in 1810 was sent as a secret agent by President James Madison to annex the Spanish territory of East Florida for the United States. Mathews was unable to claim the territory peacefully, so he created an insurrectionist force that captured Ferninanda Beach and Amelia Island and turned them over to the U.S. This act, now referred to as the Patriot War of East Florida, was denounced by Spain and its allies. Madison, under political pressure, disavowed Mathews's actions. The vagueness of Madison's instructions to Mathews have led to significant debate among historians as to whether Mathews acted outside of the purview of his mandate.

== Early life and education ==
George Mathews was born on August 30, 1739, in Augusta County in the Virginia Colony to Ann (Archer) and John Mathews. His parents immigrated to America during the early years of the Scotch-Irish on 1717–1775. His father was an early and notable member of the Augusta County community, serving as a militia captain and de facto public officer, as well as being a member of the Augusta Parish vestry. The Mathews were among the Anglican minority in the predominantly Presbyterian county. The young George Mathews had ten siblings; six brothers and four sisters. He was "by far the crudest, most dynamic, energetic, colorful, and capable of the seven boys." He may have been educated at the local Augusta Academy, although whatever schooling he obtained, he remained mostly illiterate throughout his life. (Note: Mathews was able to and did write letters which had a "unique" way of spelling things which included laugh as "laf," knock as "nok," and coffee as "kaughphy.") As a boy, George Mathews played and explored in the woods around his father's farm, and quickly gained experience with frontier dangers from local Indian tribes, rebuffing raids from the Indians into the frontier settlement.

== Early career ==
On his father's death, Mathews was willed 300 acres (120 ha) of farm land By 1762, George and a brother, Sampson Mathews, began a mercantile enterprise in Staunton, Virginia, and soon had acquired extensive property along the western frontier as far west as the Greenbrier district. The brothers established several outposts along this stretch, where they sold both frontier necessities and specialty goods, importing goods through Atlantic trade markets. The brothers additionally dealt in forced labor, mostly through contracts for convict servants from Ireland, but also African slaves. The brothers were among the "soul-drivers" in Virginia who bought convict servants wholesale from British transport ships at port, and traveled along established routes selling the convicts to farmers, planters, and others. Lodine-Chaffey suggests that the brothers' treatment of both convict servants and slaves was suspect, due to the frequency in which the servants and slaves escaped them; the brothers reported three slaves missing in 1769, and ten convicts missing in 1773. In total, their dealings in all ventures accounted for a "great share" of the trade in the region.

Mathews was elected to the Augusta Parish vestry in 1763, joining his brother Sampson who had been a member since 1761. The brothers maintained their seats on the vestry until a shift in political population caused them to be ousted by the Presbyterian majority.

The Mathews brothers were appointed trustees of Staunton in 1772. At this time, Staunton was an important trade center in the backcountry, and it along with other backcountry trade centers like Salisbury, North Carolina, contributed significantly to economic expansion in the colonies, including the development of port cities like Baltimore, Maryland, Norfolk, Virginia, and Alexandria, Virginia. This mid-18th century economic boom has been cited a major origin of the American Revolution. Mathews took an increasingly active role civic affairs during this period. In Augusta County he served as a vestryman from 1763 to 1768, high sheriff from 1770 to 1771, and justice of the peace from 1769 to 1770 and 1773 to 1775. He was appointed a captain of militia in 1766.

Mathews first gained wider recognition for his role in the October 4, 1774, Battle of Point Pleasant. In the fall of 1774, Royal Governor Lord Dunmore assembled an invasion of Native American territory along the Ohio River, culling a thousand troops largely from the Virginia frontier. The Native Americans, under the Shawnee Chief Cornstalk, attacked Virginia militia, attempting to halt its advance into the Ohio Country. Rembert Patrick described the battle as "a typical Indian battle where every man found a tree, and military discipline in the English sense was unknown." Mathews, dressed in a hunting shirt and moccasins, killed 9 Indians while remaining uninjured himself. The tide of the battle turned when the militia enacted a flanking maneuver late in the day, initiating Cornstalk's retreat. Credit for this maneuver has typically been given either to Andrew Lewis or George Mathews. From his newfound celebrity, Mathews won a special election to what became the last session of the House of Burgesses in 1775. Mathews served alongside Samuel McDowell and succeeded Charles Lewis, who had died in battle before the session began. He had already represented Augusta County in Virginia's first Revolutionary Convention in August 1774, alongside both Lewis and McDowell. However, Governor Dunmore dissolved the prorougued assembly before it convened in 1776.

== American Revolutionary War ==
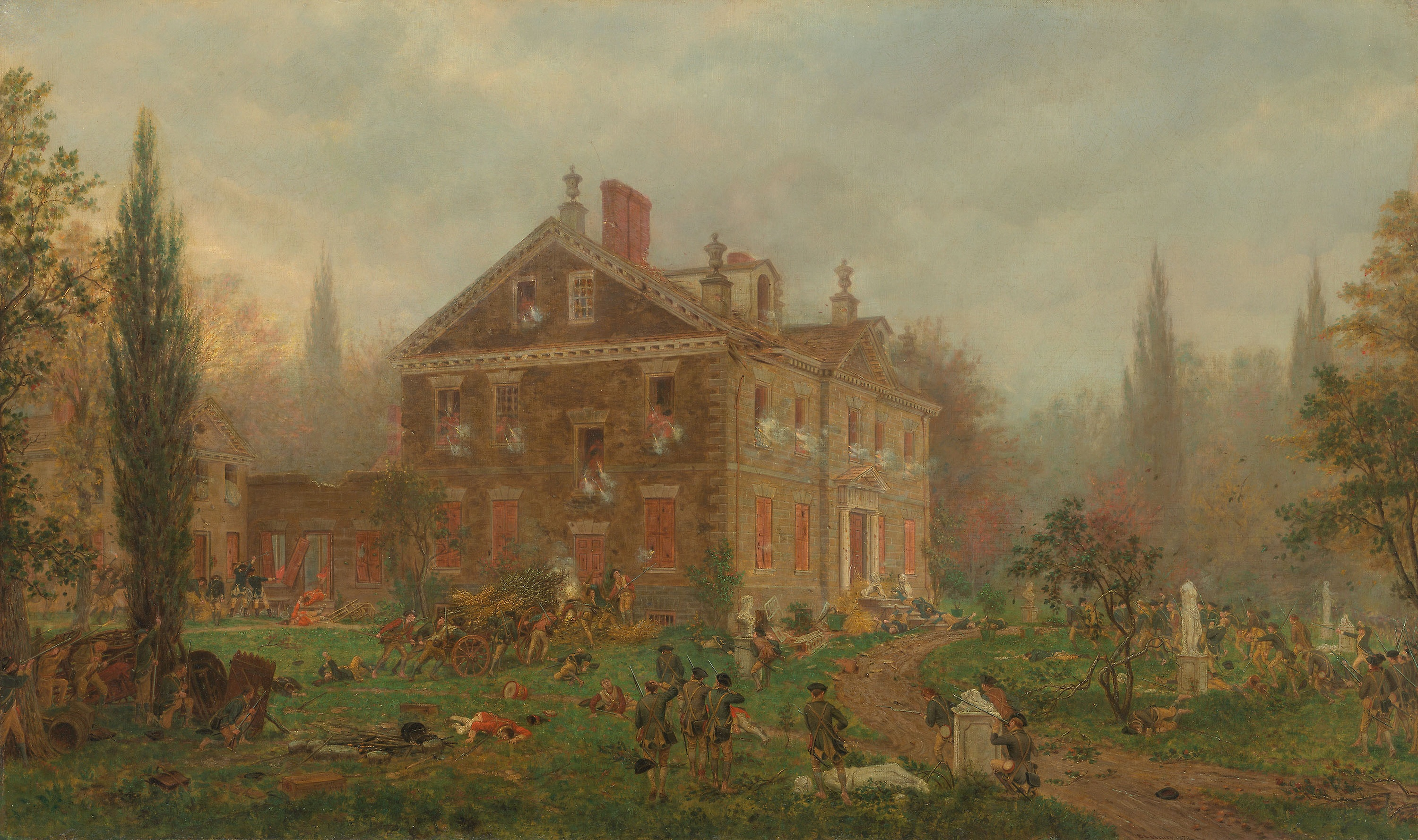
American forces lay siege during the Battle of Germantown

Mathews eagerly sought a military commission on the outbreak of the Revolutionary War. On the creation of the 9th Virginia Regiment in the Continental Army in January 1776, he was commissioned lieutenant colonel. The regiment joined General George Washington's army in December 1776, in which it embarked on Washington's Philadelphia campaign. By February 1777, Mathews was promoted to colonel of the 9th Virginia Regiment.

Mathews's regiment saw its first significant action during the September 11, 1777, Battle of Brandywine. The battle, fought between Washington's army and the British army of General Sir William Howe, was both the largest battle of the Revolution, with nearly 30,000 total belligerents, and the longest single-day battle of the war, with continuous fighting for 11 hours. The British defeated the Americans and forced them into a retreat that "nearly developed into a stampede." Mathews's regiment was one of the last to leave the field of battle, causing some to credit him for saving the American army from rout.

Following its victory, the British army set up camp in Germantown. On October 4, General Washington launched an attack on the British camp, initiating the Battle of Germantown. Mathews led a charge early in the day that resulted in the capture up to 100 British soldiers; however, as the day progressed Mathews penetrated so deeply into British lines that he became isolated from Washington's army and was engulfed by opposing troops. This resulted in the capture or death of his entire regiment, with Mathews claiming to have "bled from five wounds" during the ordeal. The given reasons for his capture vary; some claim he did not receive Washington's orders to retreat, while others claim his regiment became lost in the fog and smoke of battle. Nationally, he received acclaim and his reputation grew as a result of his daring. He spent much of the remaining revolution as a prisoner of war, first held at Philadelphia, and later on a prison ship anchored in New York Harbor. The severity of Mathews's injuries caused a British surgeon to deem him "incurable."

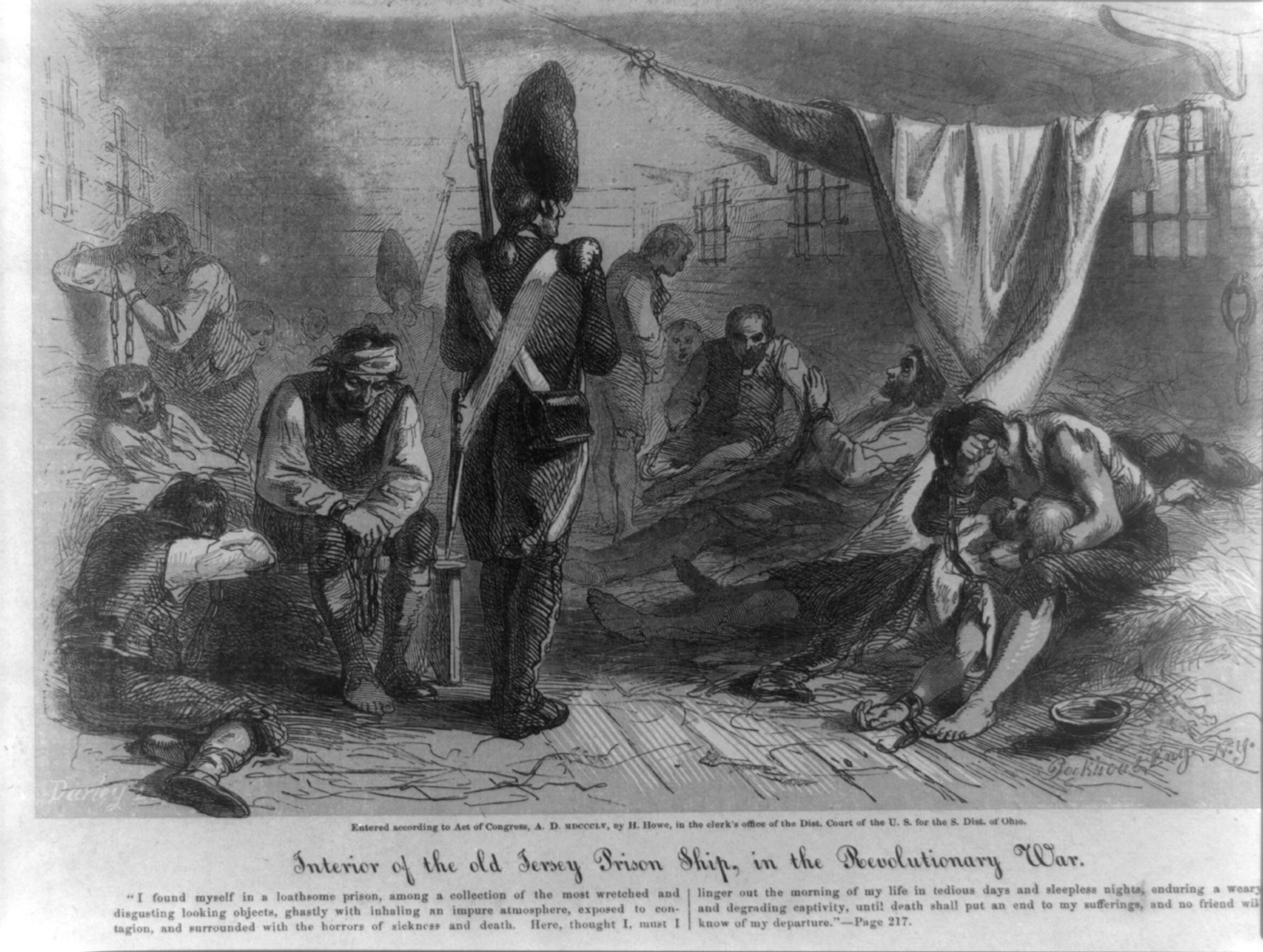
Interior of HMS Jersey

By 1779, however, Mathews recovered was granted a limited parole and permitted to live in New York City. He wrote to Governor Thomas Jefferson and to the Continental Congress urging a prisoner exchange. Jefferson wrote to Mathews to explain his decision to leave him in New York City as a parolee and instead exchange for others still suffering in much worse conditions on the prison ships. Mathews turned his attention toward the improvement of living conditions for fellow prisoners of war, securing money and provisions for this aim from Congress and the State of Virginia. He was formally exchanged on December 5, 1781, at which point he was given command of the 3rd Virginia Regiment and went with Major General Nathaniel Greene into the southern theater, though he saw no further action in the war. Mathews was brevetted brigadier general at the end of the war; on September 30, 1783, Congress conferred a "general brevet" on the officers Continental Army, advancing all below the rank of major general by one rank. Mathews was an Original Member of the Society of the Cincinnati.

== Political career in Georgia ==
During Mathews's military tour of the South, he had been impressed with the opportunities for political and financial gain on the Georgia frontier. When the 3rd Virginia Regiment was formally disbanded on January 1, 1783, he quickly petitioned the Georgia government for land, and received 1,900 acres (770 ha) in Wilkes County. He liquidated his property and settled his business affairs in Virginia and headed to the new Georgia frontier. There he and his wife, Ann Polly Paul, built a log cabin at Goose Pond. They had eight children: John, Charles Lewis, George, William, Ann, Jane, Margaret, and Rebecca. His wife Ann Polly died a few years after their arrival in Georgia. Mathews briefly returned to Staunton, Virginia, in 1790, where he married Margaret Reed, a widow. In 1793, Margaret went back to Virginia to visit friends and family, and when she later wrote to her husband to facilitate her return, he replied, "I didn't take you to Virginia, and I'm not going to trouble myself to go there and bring you back." The two never reconciled, and the Georgia legislature granted a divorce on February 3, 1797.

On the strength of his military reputation, Mathews quickly ascended to the top of Georgia state politics. He was appointed a judge in Wilkes County, and a town commissioner for Washington, Georgia. Two years later, on January 2, 1787, he was elected a member of the Georgia General Assembly; three days after that, he was elected 20th governor of the state for a one-year term. Mathews's brief term as governor was a successful one; he attended the 1787 state convention in which he voted ratify the United States Constitution, and left with the state in a position of stability. He was then elected to the House of Representatives for the 1st United States Congress. His term in Congress has been called "lackluster," owing in part to his 'frontier sensibilities' that were out of place in Congress. He was defeated for reelection in 1791, and launched a failed bid for the United States Senate the following year. However, by 1793, he had regained enough support to again be chosen the 24th governor of the state.

His second administration was more tumultuous than his first. At this time, the State of Georgia struggled to defend its vast land claims in the western part of the state, and this led to notable controversies during Mathews's tenure. In February 1794, General Elijah Clarke, a popular veteran of the American Revolutionary War, illegally established the Trans-Oconee Republic as an independent state on western state hunting grounds reserved by the federal Treaty of New York (1790) for the Creek Indians. President Washington pressured Mathews to remove Clarke and his settlers from the Creek lands, but Mathews initially ignored the pressure, sympathizing with Clarke's aim and being aware of Clarke's local popularity as a hero of the Revolution. However, the tide of public opinion eventually changed, and in September, Mathews authorized 1200 Georgia militiamen, acting in conjunction with federal troops, to surround and isolate General Clarke's fortifications, leading to Clarke's surrender.

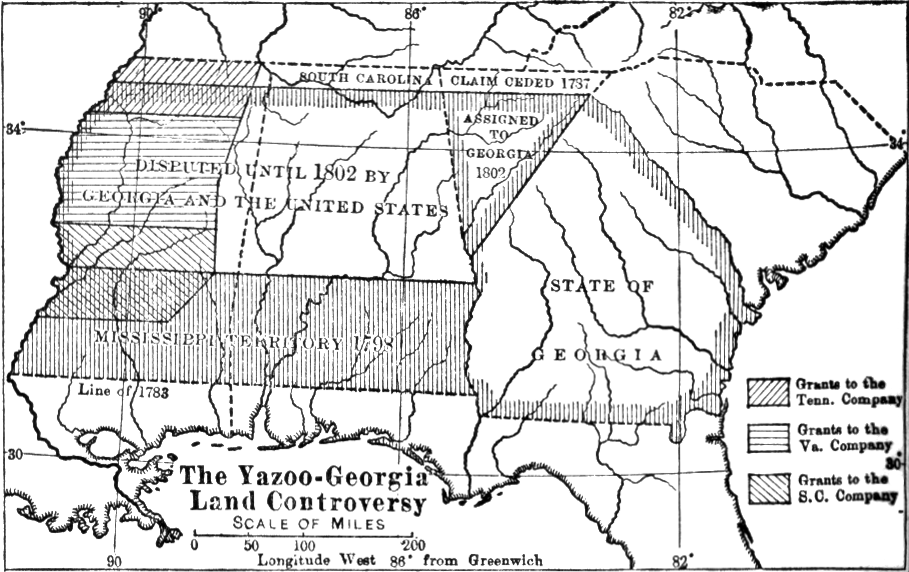
The three areas that constituted the 1789 Yazoo land scandal. Mathews's involvement in the scandal led to his political downfall.

The Georgia legislature sought to relieve its burden of its unprotected western lands by encouraging purchase offers from private land speculators. When representatives from four private groups sought to buy 35 million acres extending to the Mississippi River at less than two cents per acre, Mathews initially rejected the proposal. However, the groups bribed many Georgia politicians to favor the bill, and this increased political pressure combined with waning popularity caused Mathews ultimately to accept and sign the Yazoo land bill. The public became outraged on learning the details of the bill, leading to protests to federal officials and Congressmen. Mathews, though he did not personally profit from the bill, became its public face. Jared Irwin and U.S. Senator James Jackson led the reform efforts. Irwin was elected governor of Georgia to replace Mathews, and on February 13, 1796, less than two months after taking office, he signed a bill nullifying the Yazoo Act.

Mathews never again held a public office. He thought for a time about leaving the United States, and even wrote to George Washington asking for a character recommendation in preparation for his removal from the country, to which Washington obliged. However, in 1797, Mathews, who had by this time remarried again to Mary Carpenter, instead turned to the Mississippi Territory, where his wife owned property. Mathews again returned to land speculation, buying stock in a land company the claimant of extensive acreage in the territory. He also lobbied friends in Congress for a political appointment in the territory.

In 1798, he was appointed the first governor of the Mississippi Territory by President John Adams. However, Secretary of War James McHenry objected to the appointment, citing Mathews's financial stake in the territory. When Adams withdrew the nomination, Mathews was reported to have responded: "Sir, if you had known me, you wouldn't have taken the nomination back; if you didn't know me, you should not have nominated me to such an important office."

== Patriot War of East Florida ==
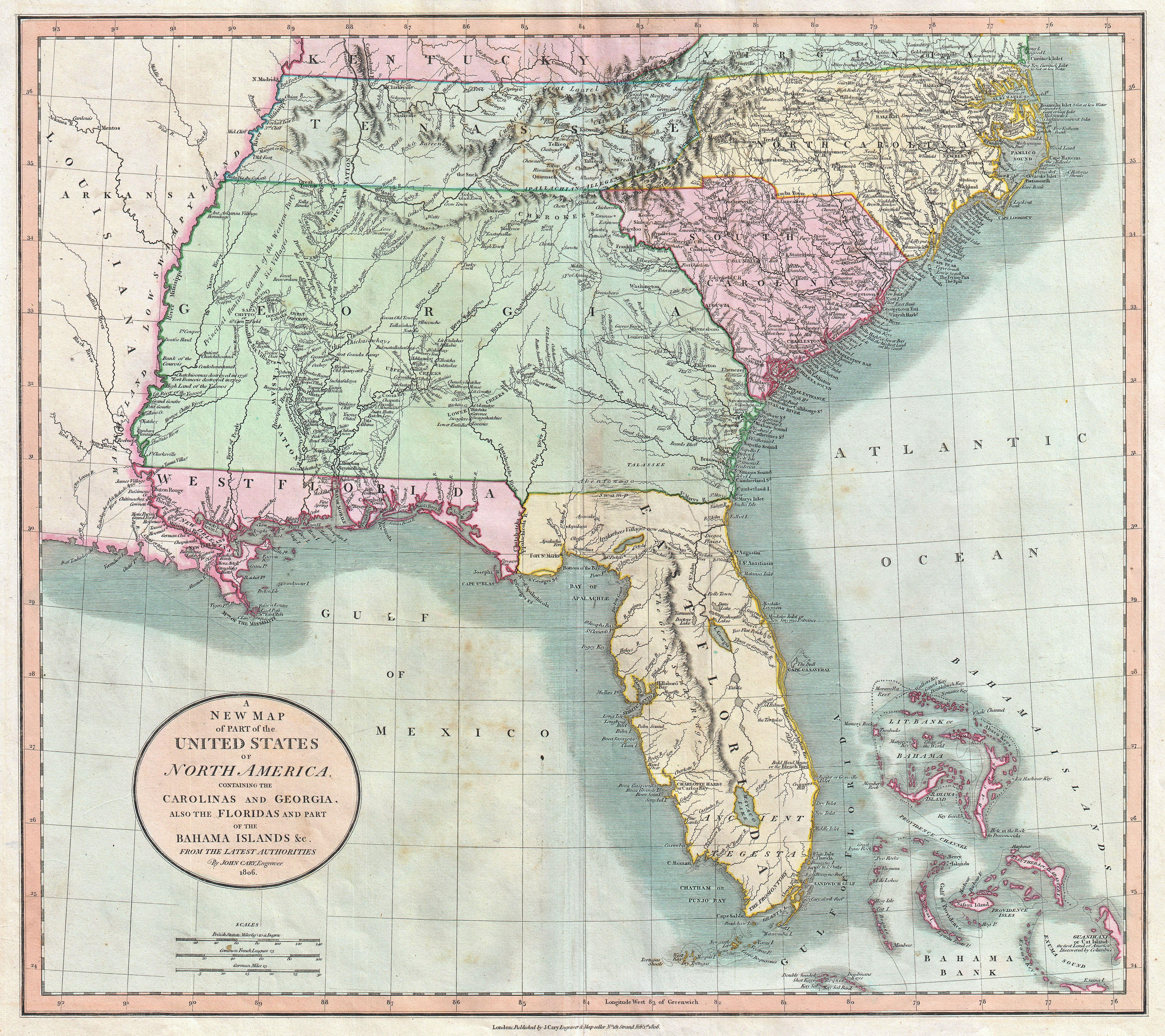
1806 John Cary map illustrates Spain's provinces of West Florida and East Florida.

In November 1810, George Mathews learned from West Florida Governor Don Vicente Folch that Folch might be willing to peacefully transfer West Florida to the United States, on account of the weakening of the Spanish monarchy due to its involvement in the Napoleonic Wars. Mathews brought this to the attention of President James Madison, who wished to build on the expansionist policies of his predecessor, Thomas Jefferson. Madison, with ambitions raised, determined to annex both West and East Florida all at once.

Madison and Mathews met in Washington, D.C., in January 1811, to discuss strategy for carrying out the annexation. Madison gave Mathews "remarkably vague and general" directions to incite a rebellion among Spanish subjects, if necessary, and in turn to accept any territories controlled by these rebel forces into the domain of the United States. Neither men took any notes about this meeting, with even the specific day of the meeting still unknown. Madison formally assigned Mathews and Indian agent John McKee as secret agents soon after, and they promptly headed south.

Mathews and McKee created an intelligence network throughout East Florida, with Mathews writing to Secretary of State James Monroe frequently. Monroe in turn encouraged Mathews to continue so long as the opportunity remained realistic. Over the weeks, however, Mathews would write many letters to Monroe that would receive no reply. Though unsettled, Mathews viewed this as an implicit endorsement of his plan, assuming the Madison administration was acting discreetly and desiring not to leave evidence of U.S. involvement. However, Madison historian J.C.A. Stagg suggests that the Madison administration followed an informal practice in which "silence implied not consent but its opposite." This practice, which the administration did not explain, resulted in several misunderstandings with high-level officials throughout the Madison administration.

Mathews became infected with malaria in the summer of 1811, and for weeks was beset to his house at St. Mary's, Georgia on the border of Georgia and Florida. Nevertheless, he wrote to Monroe in August 1811, stating his readiness to outfit a rebel force, and requesting supplies. Mathews' plans were leaked to Spanish authorities late in the summer, and the Spanish government wrote to Monroe urging him to disavow Mathews' actions and place him in arrest. Monroe instead responded with justifications for American rights to East Florida, arguing "the United States should have seized on that country [East Florida] long ago" as collateral from unpaid debts from Spain to the U.S. He took the further step to publish this rationale in an official Madison administration newspaper.

East Florida Patriot Flag, raised by the Patriot Army at Fernandina

This confirmed to Mathews the Madison administration's support of his plans in lieu of direct correspondence, and additionally proved beneficial to his recruiting efforts. By the end of 1811, he had filled leadership positions for his rebellion with wealthy Spanish planters and businessmen. Still, he had not found enough local interest to fill out a fighting force. Mathews therefore turned to the recruitment of volunteers from Georgia to play the part of his rebel Patriots. By early 1812, Mathews' Patriots numbered about 125. To bolster his force, Mathews worked out a plan for 75 U.S. troops at the border to desert the U.S. army and enlist as Patriots, while Mathews would subsequently ensure their pardon and restoration to their prior military rank at the end of the mission. However, days before the Patriots were to cross into Florida, Major Jacint Laval—Mathews' housemate in St. Mary's -- discovered Mathews's plan to lure men of his division into desertion, and objected, raising alarm. Mathews then knew he did not have the numbers needed to take St. Augustine. Fearing his window for a surprise attack was closing, he turned his attention to the lightly guarded city of Fernandina on Amelia Island, just across the river from St. Mary's. He would take Fernandina, call in U.S. troops, and move to St. Augustine from there.

On the night of March 13, 1812, Mathews, with his Patriots and support from nine U.S. Navy gunboats, entered Florida, and quickly seized rural lands off the coast of Amelia Island. A rash of fighters defected to the Patriots, bringing their numbers to about 250, with about 59 being Spanish subjects. Mathews then began negotiations with Don Justo Lopez, commandant of the fort at Fernandina, for the surrender of the city. The Patriots gained control of Fernandina on March 16, without a shot fired. The Patriots raised a new flag of East Florida designed by a member of Mathews' staff, held the territory for 24 hours, and then turned it over to the United States. Mathews wrote to Madison of the mission's success, while also requesting additional U.S. military personnel in acknowledgment of the difficulty he had faced in galvanizing local support. Mathews also revealed to Madison his intention to similarly overthrow Spanish rule of the cities of Mobile and Pensacola in West Florida.

=== The Madison administration's reaction ===
By late 1811, James Madison had become convinced of the inevitability of war with Great Britain on the Canadian border (he would officially declare war with Britain in June 1812, setting off the War of 1812). On learning of Mathews' request for further U.S. military support in Florida, as well as Spain's outrage towards the mission, Madison worried about the possibility of provoking Spain and its allies, the British, to join forces against the U.S. Further, a scandal had broken in national newspapers about Madison's purchase of dirt on political opponents from a British secret agent in New England mere days before the news of Mathews' seizure of Fernandina broke in the papers. While Monroe in particular admitted "much cleverness" in Mathews's plan, and hoped to salvage his efforts, he and Madison agreed that the political costs of publicly supporting Mathews at present were too high. Madison publicly repudiated Mathews, relieving him of duty on April 4, 1812. Madison then assigned Georgia Governor David Mitchell as his new special agent in East Florida, tasked with keeping Mathews' Patriot army intact and preserving its military occupations. Mitchell quickly informed East Florida Governor Juan José de Estrada that any attempt to drive out the Patriots would not be tolerated by the United States.

Mathews, furious with the Madison administration's repudiation, set off to Washington, D.C., where he'd "be damned if [he] didn't blow them all up." However, on the way he suffered from a recurrent malarial fever and was forced to stop in Augusta, Georgia. He died there on his 73rd birthday, and is buried in Saint Paul's Church.

=== Legacy and historical interpretations ===
Historians have been divided over the legacy of the Patriot War of East Florida. Some conclude that Mathews overstepped his authority and deliberately departed from Madison's intentions, while others believe Mathews fulfilled Madison's intentions, and that Madison repudiated Mathews for political reasons. These differences in analysis are exacerbated by the fact that Madison and Mathews left no notes of their meeting to discuss the campaign.

J.C.A. Stagg, in George Mathews and John McKee, Revolutionizing East Florida, Mobile, and Pensacola in 1812 (2007), states, "[i]t is now reasonably clear that the actions of Mathews and McKee in Florida and on the Gulf Coast between 1810 and 1812 departed far more from the policies of the [Madison] administration than they fairly reflected them," and additionally deems the Patriot War, "an embarrassing and shameful moment in the history of early American foreign policy."

However, James G. Cusick, in The Other War of 1812 (2007), states, "[i]n truth, the administration's displeasure over an attack on East Florida rested on its timing and in the unfortunate publicity it received, not on the results." G. Melvin Herndon draws a similar conclusion. In George Mathews, Frontier Patriot (1969), he states, "[i]t is generally agreed that Mathews was the victim of a vacillating administration whose dictates he had served faithfully according to his own lights. He succeeded too well; and, under pressure from several sources, President Madison and Secretary Monroe deemed it necessary to sacrifice Mathews to quell the criticism of their Florida policy. Similarly, Frank Owsley, in Filibusters and Expansionists: Jeffersonian Manifest Destiny, 1800-1821 states, "Mathews probably interpreted Madison's wishes accurately, and very likely had oral instructions from the government assuring him that his understanding of the orders was absolutely correct."

Paul Kruse, in A Secret Agent in East Florida: General George Mathews and the Patriot War (1952) observes that whatever Mathews' instructions, a letter from Mathews to Monroe, "written more than seven months before the invasion was actually attempted, fully disclosed General Mathews' revolutionary designs upon East Florida. Not to have checked the plan on such a notice made the government a party to them." Stephen F. Knott, in Secret and Sanctioned: Covert Operations and the American Presidency (1996) states: "I believe Mathews' admission that he could not achieve the seizure of East Florida without additional overt American military support pushed the administration over the edge. Months of silent acquiescence by the Madison White House came to an end."

Cusick ultimately concludes that, "in the end, the Patriot War accomplished the one thing that the War of 1812 failed to do – it brought new territory into the American confederation."

== Physical appearance ==
Rembert Patrick describes his appearance during an 1811 meeting with James Madison as thus:

In one hand he held his old three-cornered cocked hat; he had on worn knee breeches, high-topped boots, and a shirt with little ruffles at the bosom and wrists. A sword, the symbol of his military valor, dangled at his side. He was short, thick-set, with stout muscular legs; he stood straight with his head thrown back, his red hair wind-blown, and his dark blue eyes framed by a weathered face.

== Memorials ==
Several historical markers in the United States are dedicated to George Mathews. The Battle of Point Pleasant monument and memorial in Mason County, West Virginia, lists him as a captain in the army of General Andrew Lewis. A marker stands at sight of his Georgia home, "Goose Pond", in Oglethorpe County, Georgia. Another marker, in Greene County, Georgia, stands at the sight of Fort Mathews, an outpost where Thomas Houghton wrote the report to George Mathews that led to the fall of the Trans-Oconee Republic. A marker in Elbert County, Georgia, acknowledges Mathews's role in settling of that county.

== See also ==
- Seminole Wars, has a short section on the Patriot War

== Bibliography ==
- Chalkley, Lyman (1912). Chronicles of the Scotch-Irish Settlement in Virginia. Rosslyn, Virginia: The Commonwealth printing co. OCLC 2575649.
- Cusick, James G. (2007). The Other War of 1812 : the Patriot War and the American Invasion of Spanish East Florida. Athens, Georgia: University of Georgia Press. ISBN 978-0820329215.
- Ebel, Carol (2003). "George Mathews (1739–1812)". New Georgia Encyclopedia. Georgia Humanities and the University of Georgia Press.
- Floyd, Christopher (2005). "Trans-Oconee Republic". New Georgia Encyclopedia. Georgia Humanities and the University of Georgia Press.
- Herndon, G. Melvin (1969). "George Mathews, Frontier Patriot". The Virginia Magazine of History and Biography. 77 (3): 307–328. JSTOR 4247487.
- Knott, Stephen K. (1996). Secret and Sanctioned: Covert Operations and the American Presidency. Oxford University Press. ISBN 978-0-19-510098-3.
- Lamplugh, George (2002). "Yazoo Land Fraud". New Georgia Encyclopedia. Georgia Humanities and the University of Georgia Press.
- McCleskey, N. Turk (1990). Across the first divide: Frontiers of settlement and culture in Augusta County, Virginia, 1738-1770 (PhD). College of William & Mary. doi:10.21220/s2-6p40-zt04.
- Patrick, Rembert (May 2010). Florida Fiasco: Rampant Rebels on the Georgia-Florida Border, 1810-1815. University of Georgia Press. ISBN 978-0820335490.

Political offices
Preceded by Edward Telfair	Governor of Georgia; 1787–1788	Succeeded by George Handley
U.S. House of Representatives
Preceded by New seat	Member of the U.S. House of Representatives from Georgia's 3rd congressional district March 4, 1789 – March 3, 1791	Succeeded by Francis Willis
Political offices
Preceded by Edward Telfair	Governor of Georgia; 1793–1796	Succeeded by Jared Irwin
