= William Rabun =

American politician (1771–1819)

29th Governor of Georgia
- In office March 4, 1817 – October 24, 1819
- Preceded by: David Brydie Mitchell
- Succeeded by: Matthew Talbot

Personal details
- Born: April 8, 1771 Halifax County, Province of North Carolina, British America
- Died: October 24, 1819 (aged 48) Hancock County, Georgia, U.S.
- Party: Democratic-Republican Party

William Rabun (April 8, 1771 – October 24, 1819) was an American politician. He was a member of the Georgia House of Representatives and Georgia Senate in addition to serving as the 29th governor of Georgia from 1817 to 1819. Rabun County, in Northeast Georgia, is named for him.

== Early life ==
Rabun was born in Halifax County in the Province of North Carolina and moved with his parents to what became Hancock County, Georgia (then a part of Greene County) in 1785. Rabun's home in Powellton is located ten miles northeast of Sparta. In 1793 he married Mary Battle, and the couple had one son and six daughters. Rabun was a devout Baptist, and self-educated.

== Political career ==
Rabun was a member of both houses of the Georgia General Assembly. In 1805, he was elected to the Georgia House of Representatives, and in 1810, he was elected to the Georgia senate, serving until 1817 as president of the senate. When Governor David B. Mitchell resigned to accept President James Madison's appointment as U.S. agent to the Creek Nation, Rabun became governor of Georgia on March 4, 1817. Mitchell replaced Benjamin Hawkins, who had recently died. Rabun was elected to a full term as governor in November 1817 with the Democratic-Republican Party.

During the First Seminole War, Governor Rabun called on the Georgia militia, under the command of General Edmund Pendleton Gaines, to respond to raids in south Georgia. Edward F. Tattnall wrote to Governor Rabun about assisting in the raising of a force in the vicinity of the St. Mary's River on March 20, 1817. Rabun ordered two villages to be destroyed for their participation in the raids in south Georgia. By mistake, the Creek village of the Chehaws was burned, and ten Creeks were killed. General Andrew Jackson, future president of the United States, was enraged, and wanted Captain Obed Wright prosecuted for murder. Rabun rejected the authority of the federal government to intervene in the affairs of a state, especially over a state-controlled militia. He famously remarked to Jackson, "When the liberties of the people of Georgia shall have been prostrated at the feet of a military despotism, then, and not till then, will your imperious doctrine be submitted to." Rabun criticized Jackson for failing to protect Georgia from the Seminoles and the Creeks, creating a bitter rift with Jackson, but endearing himself to the state of Georgia and the state legislature.

Rabun was involved in the American Importation Case of 1820 of smuggling slaves into Creek and US territory, in violation of the 1808 law against the American slave trade. John Watson, Deputy Magistrate of Georgia, protested Rabun's interference in the execution of his legal duties in the case of 59 Africans who were allegedly seized under executive orders and later sold. The importation of the Africans and the implication of David Brydie Mitchell caused wide interest in the case. Rabun commented that anti-slave laws were being constantly violated, and that "high and low were engaging in it".

== Death and legacy ==
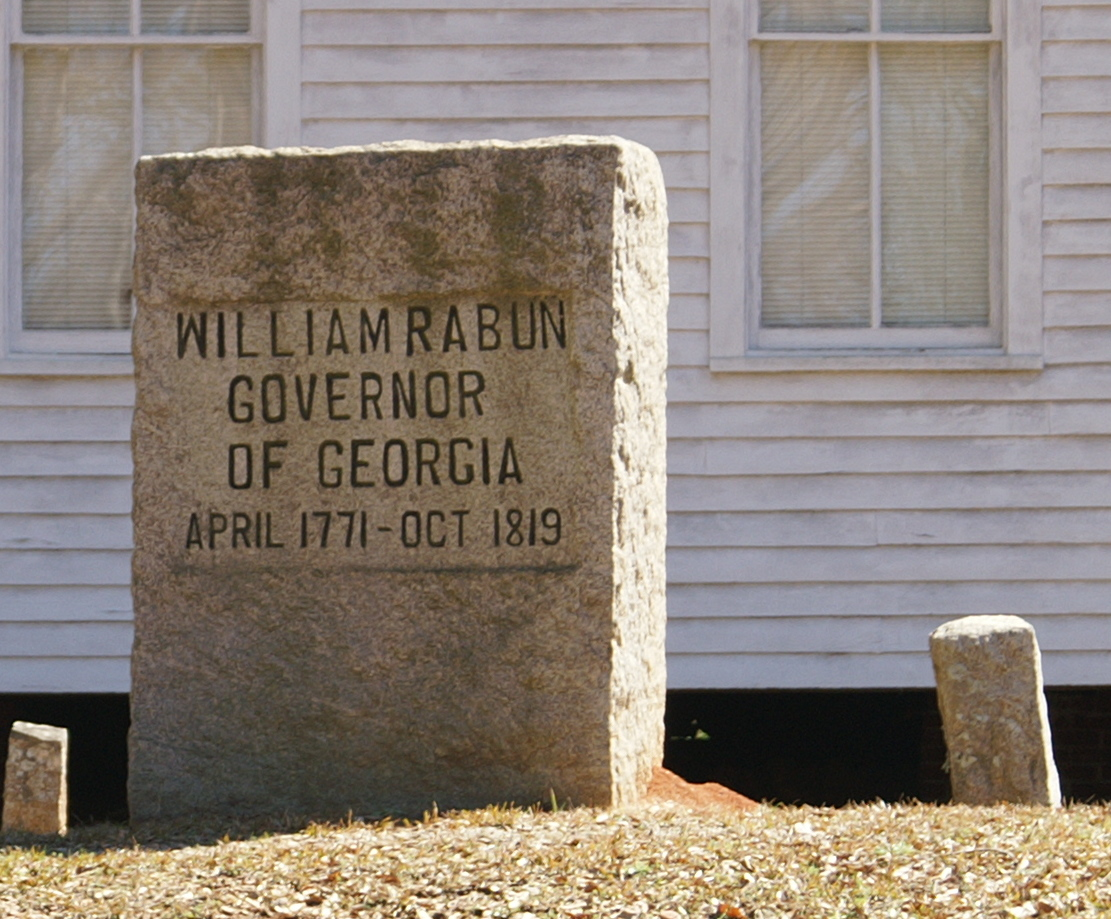
Headstone of Gov. William Rabun at Powelton Baptist Church, Powelton, Georgia

Rabun died at his home in Powelton, Hancock County, while home in between legislative sessions. He caught a fever and died unexpectedly on October 24, 1819, and was originally buried in the Martin family cemetery; however, his grave was moved to the Powelton Baptist Church in Powelton, Georgia in 1985. Jesse Mercer, the prominent Baptist minister, delivered the eulogy in memory of the late governor at the request of the General Assembly. Two months after Rabun's death, the General Assembly created Rabun County, ceded from Cherokee territory in northeast Georgia.

Political offices
Preceded by David Brydie Mitchell	Governor of Georgia; 1817–1819	Succeeded by Matthew Talbot
