= Matthew Talbot =

American politician

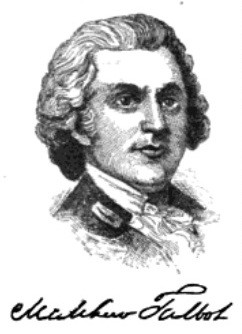

30th Governor of Georgia
- In office October 24, 1819 – November 5, 1819
- Preceded by: William Rabun
- Succeeded by: John Clark

Personal details
- Born: Matthew Talbot; September 6, 1767 Bedford County, Colony of Virginia, British America
- Died: September 17, 1827 (aged 60) Washington, Georgia U.S.
- Party: Democratic-Republican Party

Matthew Talbot (September 6, 1767 – September 17, 1827) was an American politician. He was the 30th governor of Georgia.

== Biography ==
Talbot was born in Bedford County in the Colony of Virginia and moved to Wilkes County, Georgia after the American Revolution. Talbot served as a captain in the Georgia Militia.

He was descended from one of the oldest Norman families in England. He was a grandson of Matthew Talbot, who was the third son of the tenth Earl of Shrewsbury. That Matthew Talbot was born in England in 1699. In 1722 he came on a visit to Maryland with his cousin Edward, a son Earl Talbot, to visit relatives who had settled there and for whom Talbot County in that State was named. He later moved to Maryland, and from there to Virginia where he had four sons. After the death of his wife, he moved to Bedford County, Virginia.

From 1790 to 1791, Talbot served as superior court clerk in Elbert County. He represented Wilkes county as its representative in the Georgia General Assembly.

Talbot eventually moved to Oglethorpe County, Georgia and was elected its delegate to the state Constitutional Convention in 1795 and 1798. In 1808, he was elected to the Georgia Senate and served in that capacity for fifteen years. From 1818 to 1823, he was the president of the Senate.

While Talbot was serving as that president of the Senate in 1819, governor William Rabun died in office, and Talbot served as the 30th governor for two weeks.

== Death and legacy ==
He died near Washington, Georgia and is interred in the Smyrna United Methodist Church Cemetery in Washington.

Talbot County, Georgia and Talbotton, Georgia are named in his honor.

Political offices
Preceded by William Rabun	Governor of Georgia; 1819	Succeeded by John Clark
