= William Pierce (Georgia politician) =

American Founding Father and politician

William Leigh Pierce (1753 – December 10, 1789) was a Founding Father of the United States, military officer during the Revolutionary War, member of the Continental Congress, merchant, and planter and slave owner. As a delegate representing Georgia at the Constitutional Convention of 1787, he left before he could sign the U.S. Constitution.

== Early life ==
William Leigh Pierce was born in York County, Virginia in 1753, the third and youngest son of Matthew and Elizabeth Pierce. As a young man, he studied art under Charles Willson Peale in Maryland.

== Military service ==
After returning to Virginia from Maryland in the summer of 1775, Pierce accepted a commission in the Continental Army. As tensions with Great Britain turned into armed conflict, he participated in the fighting at Hampton, Virginia, in September 1775. Pierce was commissioned a Captain in the 1st Continental Regiment of Artillery the following year as the new country organized its forces for war. After months of guarding against British incursions in the Hampton Roads area, the First Regiment of Continental Artillery was ordered to join the Main Army at Valley Forge in the Spring of 1778.

After his regiment arrived at Valley Forge, Pierce's battery was then detached to Major General John Sullivan's command in Rhode Island. Suffering from poor health, Pierce voluntarily suspended his company command and accepted a position as an aide-de-camp to General Sullivan in early 1779. He attended his commander in the punitive expedition in Upstate New York to subdue the British-aligned Iroquois during the summer.

Returning to Williamsburg, Virginia on furlough in early 1780, Pierce evidently studied at the College of William & Mary and was accepted as a member of Phi Beta Kappa. As the War for American Independence shifted to the southern states, Pierce was again invited to become an aide-de-camp to a general officer in December 1780, this time to Major General Nathanael Greene. Pierce accepted the assignment and joined his new corps on its fighting retreat in North Carolina in early February 1781.

Pierce proved himself valuable to Greene over the course of the next two years, not only in his secretarial duties but as a military officer. For example, he assisted in the rallying a contingent of Virginia troops at a critical moment during the Battle of Hobkirk Hill and was also Greene's selection to carry news of the Battle of Eutaw Springs to the Continental Congress.

== Merchant, planter, and politician ==
With the end of the war, Pierce established himself as a merchant and planter, marrying the daughter of a wealthy South Carolinian. Conditions for business were dim during the nation's Confederation period, so Pierce sought political office with the hope of improving his prospects. He was elected to represent Chatham County in Georgia's General Assembly on February 1, 1786. The state legislature promptly elected him to the Confederation Congress, as well as a delegate to the Constitutional Convention.

In January 1787, he attended Congress in New York, the nation's temporary capital, and in May traveled to Philadelphia for the convention. Pierce attended the proceedings and spoke on a number of points. He also recorded a series of "Character Sketches", providing a narrative on the personalities of the convention's delegates.

Although he agreed with the end result of the proceedings, Pierce did not sign the Constitution, having left at the end of June to attend to "a piece of business so necessary that it became unavoidable." The business was a duel with merchant John Auldjo, after tempers had flared over mishandled "mercantile dealings." Ironically, Auldjo's second, Alexander Hamilton, intervened and prevented the contest. Returning to Georgia, Pierce continued in the state legislature and, in 1789, received a respectable number of votes for Governor.

== Death ==
Pierce died at his plantation near Savannah on December 10, 1789 after a lingering illness.
