= Richard Howly =

American politician

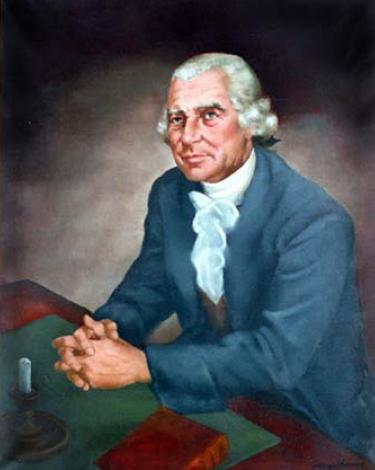

Richard Howly (1740 – December 1784), sometimes spelled Howley, was an American planter and lawyer from Liberty County, Georgia. He served briefly as the governor of Georgia in 1780, as a delegate to the Continental Congress in 1780 and 1781, and as chief justice of Georgia in 1782 and 1783.

== Early life ==
Little is known about Howley's early life. In 1775 he married Sarah Fuller of Charleston, South Carolina, the widow of William Fuller and mother of two daughters. Subsequently, the couple had two daughters of their own, only one of whom reached adulthood.

== Revolutionary War ==
When the Revolution began, Howley was practicing law in Sunbury, where he also owned a small plantation and a few slaves. He was not prominent in the early stages of the Revolution in Georgia. Savannah fell to the British on December 29, 1778, and Colonel Augustine Prevost began a siege of Sunbury. When Fort Morris surrendered in January 1779, Howley and his family fled to Augusta.

The British occupied eastern Georgia, and fighting moved into the back country. Georgia Whigs, openly divided into radical and conservative factions since the Gwinnett–McIntosh duel in May 1777 between patriot leader Button Gwinnett and Lachlan McIntosh, vied for political leadership as they tried to convene a new assembly in Augusta. After selecting an executive council to govern the sections of the state still under Whig control, this council, dominated by conservative Whigs, elected John Wereat president on August 6, 1779. Howley was associated with the radical Whig faction and a close ally of George Walton who, after the joint American and French siege of Savannah failed in October 1779, was sent to Augusta to hold new elections. Backed by Howley, George Wells, and their back country supporters, Walton organized a rival assembly in November 1779. This body elected Walton governor and Walton, Howley, and three others delegates to the Continental Congress, in effect ousting Wereat from power. Within two months, Walton departed for Philadelphia. The assembly elected Howley governor on January 4, 1780 and empowered him to act on behalf of the government even if forced into exile. During these uncertain times he called on Georgians to be steadfast in their support of independence. As British raids increased, the council directed Howley to flee to the Carolinas. Howley and several council members transported the state archives and some paper money to New Bern, North Carolina. On July 1, 1780 he was among those listed under the British Disqualifying Act.

== Political life ==
Howley took his seat in Congress in July 1780. He assisted in obtaining a new loan from France. His primary interest, however, was to guard against peace proposals that would allow Britain to retain control of Georgia. With Walton and William Few, he published Observations upon the Effects of Certain Late Political Suggestions by the Delegates of Georgia.

Howley lost his re-election bid to Congress and returned to Georgia. He was elected to the Georgia General Assembly in 1782. He was able to acquire confiscated Tory property being sold in Chatham and Liberty counties. Aedanus Burke turned down an offer to become chief justice of Georgia, and in October 1782 Howley was appointed pro tempore chief justice. He represented Liberty County in the general assembly during 1783 and 1784, after which he moved his residence to Savannah.

== Death ==
A devout Roman Catholic, Howley journeyed to St. Augustine in December 1784 to receive sacraments of penance and holy communion that were not available in Georgia. While there, he wrote to Bishop Echevarrio of Cuba requesting that priests from Florida be sent to administer sacraments to Catholics in Georgia. Apparently ill when he returned from Florida, Howley died at his residence in Savannah.

Political offices
Preceded by George Walton	Governor of Georgia; 1780	Succeeded by Stephen Heard
