= Seaborn Wright =

American politician

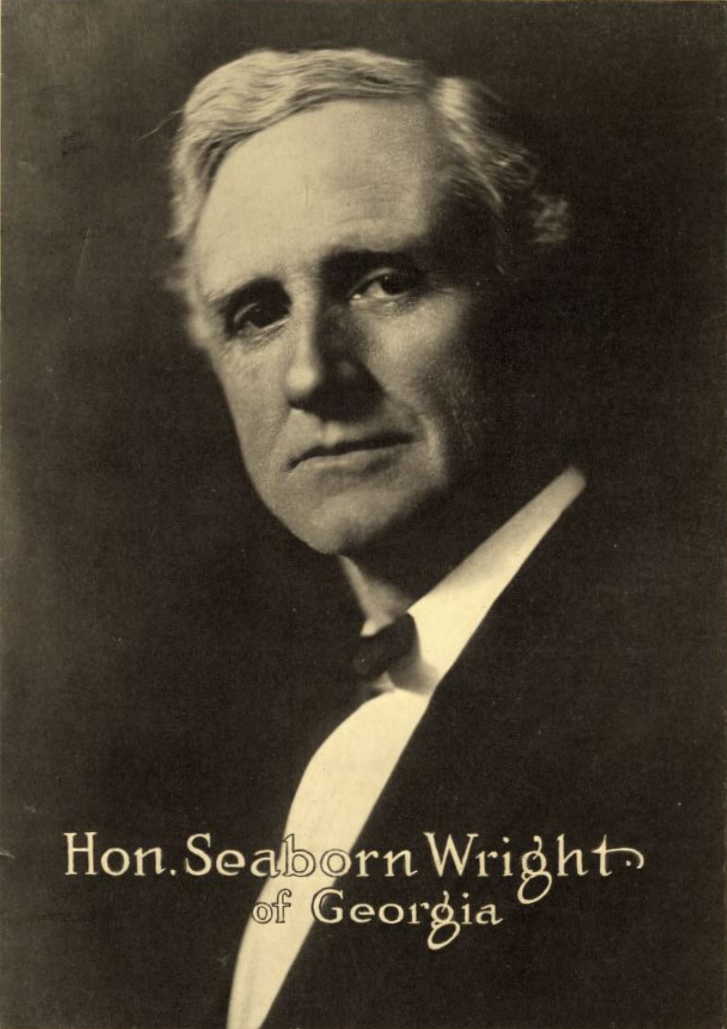

Personal details
- Born: November 30, 1857 Floyd County, Georgia
- Died: December 15, 1933 (aged 76) Milledgeville, Georgia

Seaborn Wright (November 30, 1857 – December 15, 1933) was an attorney and politician in the U.S. state of Georgia. He served in the Georgia House of Representatives from Rome, Georgia. He supported prohibition. He was a third party candidate for governor. He was a strident prohibitionist.

In 1907 he wrote to Thomas Edward Watson.

In 1908 he was billed as a Southern orator and fighter for clean government in a newspaper notice promoting him as a speaker for a campaign rally in Grand Junction, Colorado.
