= 1861 Georgia gubernatorial election =

- 2 October 1861
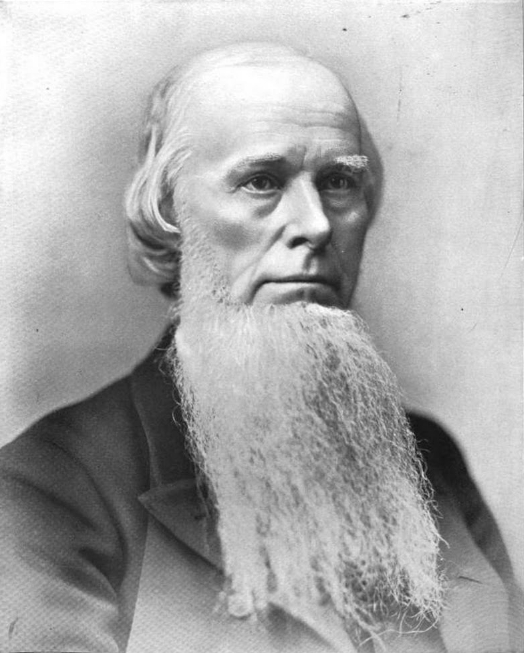

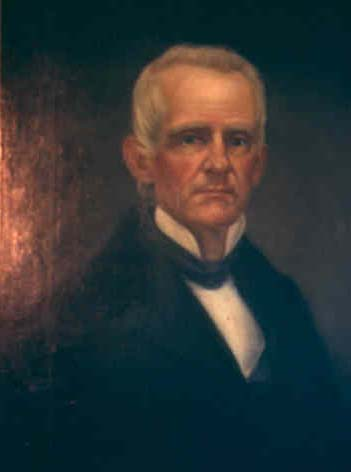
Nominee	Joseph E. Brown	E. A. Nisbet
Party	Democratic	Democratic
Alliance		Anti-Brown
Popular vote	46,493	32,802
Percentage	58.63%	41.37%
- Results by County; Brown: 50–60% 60–70% 70–80% 80–90% >90% Nisbet: 50–60% 60–70% 70–80% >90%
Governor before election
Joseph E. Brown
Democratic
Elected Governor
Joseph E. Brown
Democratic

The 1861 Georgia gubernatorial election was held on October 2, 1861, in order to elect the Governor of Georgia. It was the first gubernatorial election in Georgia under the Confederate States of America and saw Democratic nominee and incumbent Governor Joseph E. Brown win a third term against Anti-Brown Democratic nominee Judge E. A. Nisbet.

Brown's opposition did not want him to go unchallenged and so held an Anti-Brown convention at Milledgeville where they nominated Judge E. A. Nisbet for the governorship. Concerned about the prospect of Brown serving a third term, they argued that too frequent reelections would convert the governorship into a dictatorship and that Brown should willingly relinquish the office to Nisbet. Furthermore, a writer accused Brown of demagoguery and condemned him for nursing his "pet brigadiers," specifically mentioning Brown's conduct in keeping Brigadier General C. J. Phillips in camp at a cost of $100,000 to the state.

In a letter to the people of Georgia, Brown attacked the Milledgeville caucus as being unnecessary, accusing Nisbet of being the candidate of the "politicians". He also accused his opposition of wishing to bring back political strife and oppose the will of the people. Supporters of Brown asserted that Nisbet had spent most of his life in the city and that his health was too delicate to undertake the heavy tasks of the governor's office. Additionally, they accused the Anti-Brown Democrats of being "neutral Yankees."

Despite winning the governorship with 58.63% of the vote, Brown was met with a Nisbet legislature in November 1861, and it was prophesied that this body would "give him the devil." Throughout the duration of the war, this legislature proved to be a persistent source of difficulty for Brown, complicating his governance during the war years.

== General election ==
On election day, October 2, 1861, Democratic nominee Joseph E. Brown won re-election by a margin of 13,691 votes against Anti-Brown Democratic nominee E. A. Nisbet, thereby becoming the first person to hold the office of Governor of Georgia for three terms.

Georgia gubernatorial election, 1861
Party	Candidate	Votes	%
Democratic	Joseph E. Brown (incumbent)	46,493	58.63
Democratic	E. A. Nisbet	32,802	41.37
Total votes		79,295	100
