= James Jackson (Georgia politician) =

American politician (1757–1806)

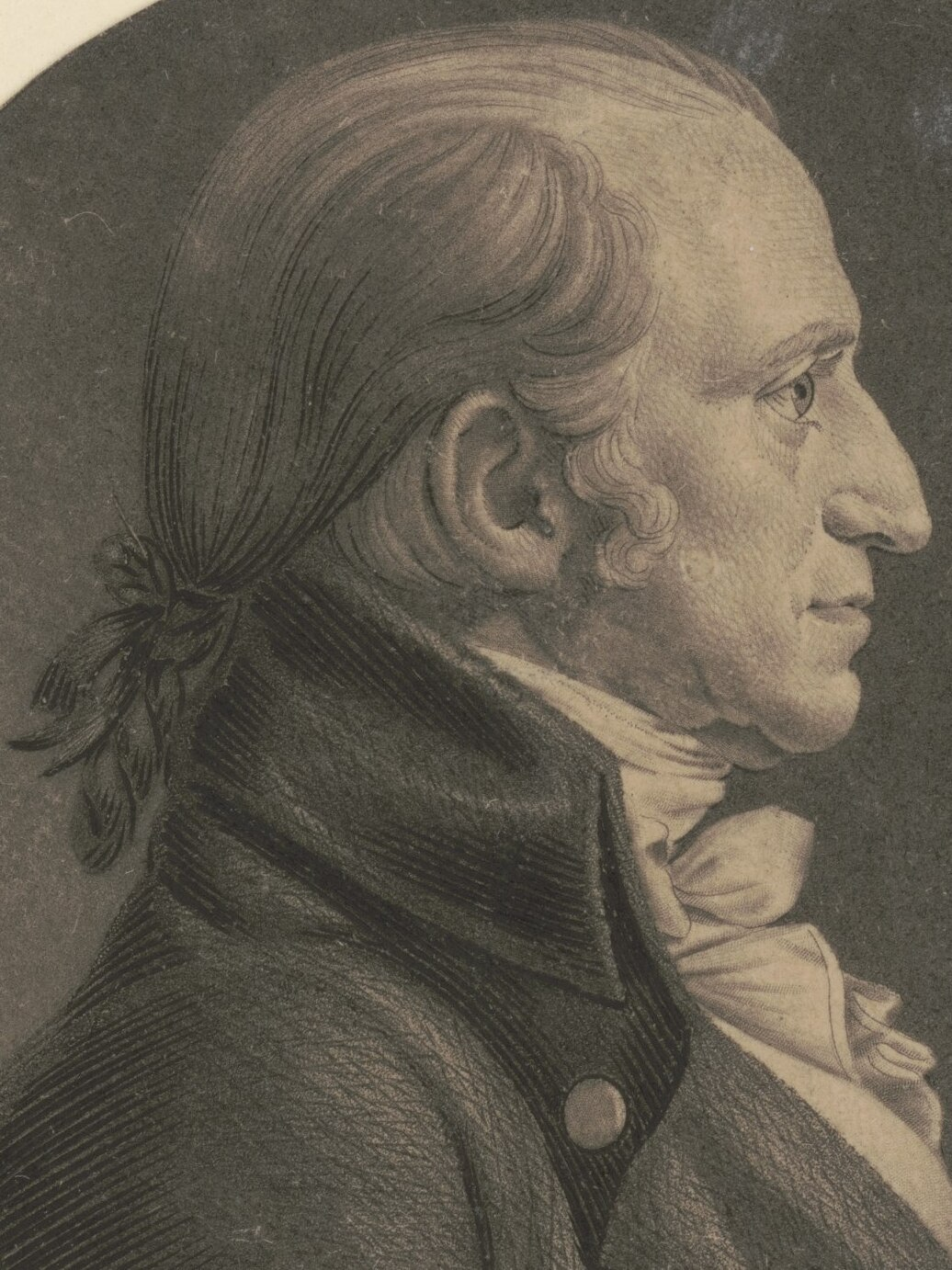

United States Senator from Georgia
- In office March 4, 1801 – March 19, 1806
- Preceded by: James Gunn
- Succeeded by: John Milledge
- In office March 4, 1793 – October 31, 1795
- Preceded by: William Few
- Succeeded by: George Walton

23rd Governor of Georgia
- In office January 12, 1798 – March 3, 1801
- Preceded by: Jared Irwin
- Succeeded by: David Emanuel

Member of the U.S. House of Representatives from Georgia's 1st district
- In office March 4, 1789 – March 3, 1791
- Preceded by: District established
- Succeeded by: Anthony Wayne

Personal details
- Born: September 21, 1757 Moretonhampstead, Devon, England
- Died: March 19, 1806 (aged 48) Washington, D.C., U.S.
- Party: Anti-Administration; Democratic-Republican
- Children: Jabez Young Jackson
- Relatives: James Jackson (grandson)

Military service
- Allegiance: United States
- Branch/service: Georgia Militia
- Unit: 1st Brigade Georgia Militia
- Battles/wars: American Revolutionary War: Battle of Cowpens

James Jackson (September 21, 1757 – March 19, 1806) was an early British-born Georgia politician of the Democratic-Republican Party. He was a member of the U.S. House of Representatives from 1789 until 1791. He was also a U.S. senator from 1793 to 1795, and from 1801 until his death in 1806. In 1797 he was elected 23rd governor of Georgia, serving from 1798 to 1801 before returning to the senate.

== Early life ==
Jackson was born in Moretonhampstead, Devonshire, England. He migrated at age 15 to Savannah, Georgia in 1772, and it was then that he became a ward of Savannah lawyer, John Wereat. As a young man, Jackson became well known as a duelist with a fiery temper; in February 1780 he killed Georgia governor George Wells in a duel. In 1785, he married Mary Charlotte Young, with whom he had five sons, four of whom later became prominent in the state's public affairs.

== Revolutionary War ==
During the American Revolutionary War, he served in the 1st Brigade Georgia Militia at the defense of Savannah, the Battle of Cowpens, and the recapture of Augusta and Savannah.

When the British left Savannah in July 1782, General Anthony Wayne gave Jackson the privilege of receiving the keys to the city. Even after the Revolutionary War, Jackson remained an important and influential figure in the Georgia Militia; he participated in the expansionist drive against the Creek Nation in Georgia. Jackson eventually thus rose to the rank of brigadier general of Georgia's militia in 1786 and major general in 1792.

== Political career ==
After the war, he built up his law practice in Savannah. Jackson was elected to the first Georgia state legislature in 1777 after he had been clerk of court in the Provincial Congress. His interest in the military was rekindled when he joined the Georgia militia in the defense of Georgia frontier settlers against Indian inhabitants. In 1788, Jackson was elected governor of Georgia but declined the position, citing his inexperience.

In 1789, Jackson was elected to the First United States Congress in one of Georgia's most competitive districts. The First District was the least populated district in the state; because of the three-fifths rule for counting slaves, the district was deemed to have a population of over 16,000. It was also one of the most contested districts in the state. Jackson ran against William Houston and Henry Osborne, the former a veteran of the Confederation Congress, the latter of the Continental Congress. Jackson won by a narrow margin, and the result was unsuccessfully challenged by Osborne. As a Jeffersonian Republican, he vigorously opposed Secretary of the Treasury Alexander Hamilton's plans for federal assumption of the states' debts from the Revolutionary War.

One of Hamilton's first proposals was to tax spirits. Jackson opposed that proposal, saying it would "deprive the mass of the people of almost the only luxury they enjoy, that of distilled spirits." It was originally suggested that the tax be 15¢ a gallon, but Jackson backed a competing proposal for a tax of 12¢ a gallon. The higher tax was passed despite Jackson's opposition.

The next bill over which Jackson and Hamilton fought concerned the assumption of states' debts from the Revolutionary War. Hamilton wanted to collapse all of the states' debts from the war into one national debt, which would spread the burden of repayment ratably across the union. Jackson, by contrast, believed that states like Georgia that accumulated little debt during the war should not bear the burden of repayment at the same rate as the higher-debt states. He also opposed efforts to curtail slavery. He warned that ending slavery would "light up the flame of civil discord for the people of the Southern States" who "will never suffer themselves to be divested of their property without a struggle."

While serving in the House of Representatives, Jackson served on over twenty committees and reported on many more. During his first term, Jackson became known for his fiery temper and personality; he once became so impassioned that the senators who were meeting above the House chamber had to close the windows to muffle the sound of Jackson's voice.

Defeated for re-election in 1791 by his former Revolutionary commander, Anthony Wayne (for whom Wayne County is named), in a campaign rife with charges of irregularity against Wayne's supporters, Jackson contested the outcome and succeeded in removing Wayne from Congress. Making effective use of grand jury presentments and newspapers, Jackson secured a seat in the legislature and subsequently oversaw the ouster of Wayne's campaign manager from a state judgeship. Jackson then took his struggle to Congress, where he convinced the House that Wayne had not won fairly. He failed, however, to regain his seat, the Federalist Speaker casting a tie-breaking vote against seating him.

Meanwhile, the state of Georgia sold millions of acres in the Yazoo region at extremely low prices to a group of investors. Jackson, believing that the sale was influenced by bribery, resigned his post in the Senate to run for a seat in the Georgia legislature in 1795. He won the election and led a campaign to repeal the Yazoo land sale. In 1798, he was elected governor of Georgia and implemented legislation repealing the Yazoo land sale. Jackson blamed the Yazoo land fraud on his political enemies, including James Gunn and the Federalists. He built the Georgia Democratic-Republican party and led it to statewide dominance.

He was a presidential elector in the 1796 presidential election.

Jackson was re-elected to the Senate in 1801 and served until his death in 1806.

== Legacy ==
He is buried in the Congressional Cemetery, a National Historic Landmark in Washington, DC.

Jackson was the patriarch of a political dynasty in Georgia. His son, Jabez Young Jackson, was a representative from Georgia in the Twenty-fourth and Twenty-fifth United States Congress.

His grandson, also named James Jackson, was a U.S. representative from Georgia, a judge advocate on the staff of General Thomas "Stonewall" Jackson and a trustee of the University of Georgia.

Jackson is the namesake of Jackson County, Georgia, Jackson, Georgia, James Jackson Parkway Northwest in Atlanta. Fort James Jackson, which protected the city of Savannah from attack by sea during most of the nineteenth century, is today a museum and restored garrison. The ghost town of Jacksonboro, Georgia is also named for Jackson.

== See also ==
- List of United States governors born outside the United States
- List of United States senators born outside the United States
- List of members of the United States Congress who died in office (1790–1899)

U.S. House of Representatives
Preceded by New seat	Member of the U.S. House of Representatives from Georgia's 1st congressional district March 4, 1789 – March 3, 1791	Succeeded by Anthony Wayne
U.S. Senate
Preceded by William Few	U.S. senator (Class 2) from Georgia; 1793–1795; Served alongside: James Gunn	Succeeded by George Walton
Preceded by James Gunn	U.S. senator (Class 3) from Georgia; 1801–1806; Served alongside: Abraham Baldwin	Succeeded by John Milledge
Political offices
Preceded by Jared Irwin	Governor of Georgia; 1798–1801	Succeeded by David Emanuel
