= David Brydie Mitchell =

American politician (1766–1837)

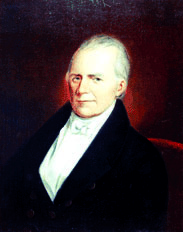

27th Governor of Georgia
- In office November 10, 1809 – November 5, 1813
- Preceded by: Jared Irwin
- Succeeded by: Peter Early
- In office November 20, 1815 – March 4, 1817
- Preceded by: Peter Early
- Succeeded by: William Rabun

Attorney General of Georgia
- In office 1796–1806
- Governor: Jared Irwin; James Jackson; David Emanuel; Josiah Tattnall; John Milledge
- Preceded by: George Walker
- Succeeded by: Robert Walker

Member of the Georgia Senate

Member of the Georgia House of Representatives

Personal details
- Born: October 22, 1766 Muthill, Perthshire, Scotland
- Died: April 22, 1837 (aged 70) Milledgeville, Georgia, U.S.
- Profession: Lawyer

David Brydie Mitchell (October 22, 1766 – April 22, 1837) was a Scottish born American politician in Georgia who was elected in 1809 as governor of the state, serving two terms. He was elected again in 1815 for one term.

Mitchell moved to Georgia at the age of 24. He was elected as mayor of Savannah and later appointed as state attorney general. He also served three terms in the Georgia General Assembly, two in the House of Representatives, and one in the Senate.

Mitchell resigned from the governorship in 1817 to accept an appointment by President James Monroe as United States Indian Agent to the Creek Nation in their lands in present-day Georgia and Alabama. He followed the more than two-decade tenure of Benjamin Hawkins. In 1820 he was prosecuted for being involved in smuggling of American slaves from Spanish Florida. He was replaced in 1821 by President Monroe, who appointed John Crowell.

== Early life ==
Mitchell was born in Muthill, Perthshire, Scotland, on October 22, 1766. As a young man he inherited land in Georgia from his uncle.

He moved to Georgia in 1782 after the American Revolutionary War to Savannah, Georgia, to claim it. Enthusiastic about the new country, Mitchell read the law with established attorneys and passed the bar. He was elected as mayor of Savannah (1801–1802) and made connections statewide.

Mitchell married Jane Mills in 1792, and according to family records the couple had six children.

== Political career ==
Mitchell was appointed as Attorney General of Georgia (1796–1806). He moved to Mount Nebo Plantation, near the state capital of Milledgeville. He served three terms in the Georgia General Assembly, two as a representative and one in the Senate.

Mitchell was elected to two consecutive two-year terms as the 27th governor of Georgia (1809–1813) and a third non-consecutive term from 1815 to 1817.

He resigned from his third term as governor to accept appointment by President James Monroe as the U.S. agent to the Creek Indians. One of Mitchell's responsibilities was the negotiation of the Treaty of the Creek Agency (1818), by which the Creek ceded land to the United States. He was accused in the American Importation Case of 1820 (see The Antelope) of smuggling slaves into Creek and US territory, in violation of the 1808 law against the American slave trade. While his direct responsibility remains controversial, Mitchell allowed those engaged in this illegal activity to seek refuge for their captives at the agency he supervised along the Flint River. The incident resulted in a major inquiry and his dismissal by President James Monroe in 1821. Beginning in 1828, Mitchell was appointed to serve as the inferior court judge of Baldwin County, Georgia. He was elected as Baldwin County's State Senator in 1836.

== Legacy and honors ==
- Fort Mitchell, Alabama, was built by the Georgia militia in 1813 on land he donated, and it was named for him. Fort Mitchell Historic Site is a National Historic Landmark. Adjacent is Fort Mitchell National Cemetery, opened in 1987.
- Fort Mitchell, Florida, also named for him, was from January to May 1814 the capital of the Republic of East Florida.

== Death ==
Mitchell died at Mount Nebo Plantation, his home in Milledgeville, on April 22, 1837. He is buried at Memory Hill Cemetery of the same city.

Political offices
Preceded by Thomas Gibbons	Mayor of Savannah; 1801–1802	Succeeded by Charles Harris
Preceded by Jared Irwin	Governor of Georgia; 1809–1813	Succeeded by Peter Early
Preceded by Peter Early	Governor of Georgia; 1815–1817	Succeeded by William Rabun
