= Jared Irwin =

American politician (1750–1818)

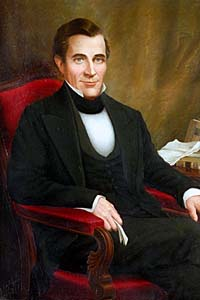

Governor of Georgia
- In office January 15, 1796 – January 12, 1798
- Preceded by: George Mathews
- Succeeded by: James Jackson
- In office September 23, 1806 – November 10, 1809
- Preceded by: John Milledge
- Succeeded by: David B. Mitchell

Personal details
- Born: 1750 Anson County, North Carolina (now Mecklenburg County, North Carolina)
- Died: March 1, 1818 (aged 67–68) Washington County, Georgia, U.S.
- Party: Democratic-Republican

Jared Irwin (1750 – March 1, 1818) served twice as elected governor of Georgia (1796–1798) and (1806–1809). He first was elected to office as a reformer based on public outrage about the Yazoo land scandal. He signed a bill that nullified the Yazoo Act, which had authorized the land sales. Challenges to land claims purchased under the former act led to the United States Supreme Court's hearing the case Fletcher v. Peck (1810). In a landmark decision, the Court upheld the land contracts, and ruled that the state law was unconstitutional in trying to nullify valid contracts.

== Early life and education ==
Jared Irwin was born in 1750 in what was then Anson County, North Carolina. (His birthplace is now located in Mecklenburg County, which was formed from the western portion of Anson County in 1762.) His family moved to Burke County, Georgia when he was young.

== Career ==
Irwin fought in the American Revolution, in which he entered the army as a private. During the war, he demonstrated leadership and was promoted to the rank of colonel.

He was a member of the state convention that adopted the Constitution of 1789.

In September 1794, 1,200 Georgia militiamen, led by Irwin acting in conjunction with federal troops stationed on the Oconee, surrounded and isolated General Elijah Clarke's fortifications on the Oconee called the Trans-Oconee Republic. After some negotiation, Clarke agreed to surrender, provided that he and his men would not face prosecution for their actions. Clarke and his followers departed, and the militia burned down the new settlements and fortifications.

Soon after the end of the war, Georgia and other states rapidly tried to develop their frontier lands. It was an environment ripe for scandal and speculation, which took place in Georgia and other states. Because of public outrage about millions of acres of state lands' being sold for low prices to insider speculators, Irwin was elected Governor in 1795 to clean up the Yazoo land scandal. On February 13, 1796, less than two months after taking office, Irwin signed the bill nullifying the Yazoo Act. To make a public statement, he burned a copy of the Yazoo Act on the grounds of the capital. The legislature had just moved the capital to Louisville in response to the scandal.

During his second term, Irwin administered the state's second land lottery, as land sales and development were still a priority for the state. He was defeated for re-election in 1809 by David Brydie Mitchell, a judge who was a former state legislator and mayor of Savannah. Irwin also unsuccessfully ran for governor in 1793, 1801, and 1811.

Irwin died on March 1, 1818, aged approximately 68 years. A resident of Washington County, Irwin was buried near Ohoopee Baptist Church.

== Legacy ==
- The towns of Irwinville and Irwinton, and the county of Irwin were named after him.

Political offices
Preceded by George Mathews	Governor of Georgia; 1796–1798	Succeeded by James Jackson
Preceded by John Milledge	Governor of Georgia; 1806–1809	Succeeded by David B. Mitchell
