= John Millen =

John Millen may refer to:

- John Millen (American politician) (1804–1843), American politician
- John Millen (Australian politician) (1877–1941), Australian politician
- John Millen (sailor) (born 1960), Canadian sailor
