= Orange Hall =

Orange Hall may refer to:

in Ireland

- Orange Institution

in the United States

- Orange Hall (St. Marys, Georgia), listed on the NRHP in Georgia
