= John Houston McIntosh =

American Landowner & Participant in the Patriot War (Florida)

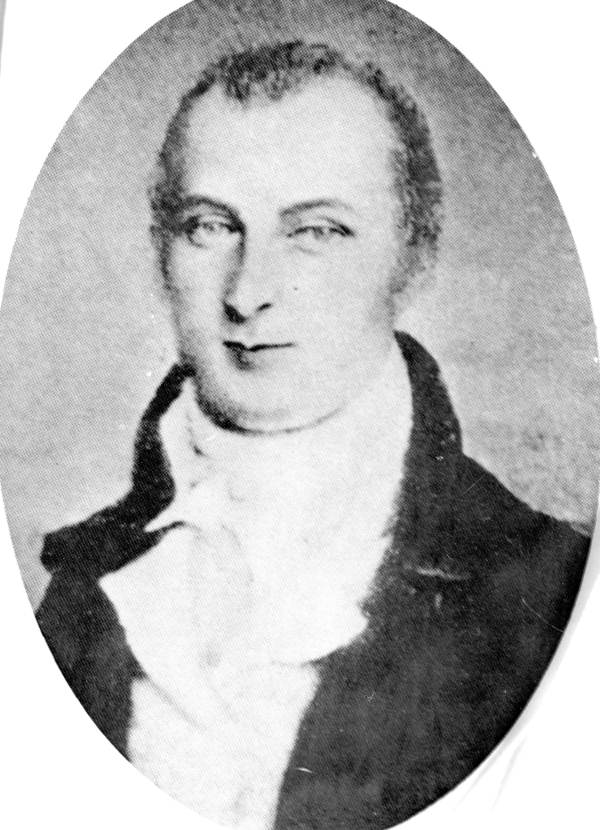
- John Houstoun McIntosh
- Born: May 1, 1773; McIntosh County, Georgia
- Died: February 9, 1836
- Occupations: Planter, Filibuster
- Known for: Leader of American filibusters during the Patriot War (Florida)
- Spouse: Eliza Bayard (m. 1792)
- Children: 3
- Relatives: Duncan Lamont Clinch (Son-in-Law)

John Houston McIntosh, also sometimes spelled John Houstoun McIntosh, (1773-1836) was a wealthy planter in Georgia who helped lead a rebel group during the Patriot War in Florida.

== Early life and family ==
John H. McIntosh was born on May 1, 1773, in what is now McIntosh County, Georgia. John was the only son of George McIntosh and Ann Priscilla Houstoun. In 1792 John married Eliza Bayard, a woman from a prominent New York family, and they had 3 children, Catherine Ann McIntosh, John Houston McIntosh Jr., and Eliza Bayard McIntosh. Eliza would eventually marry Duncan L. Clinch, who would go on to serve as an officer in the U.S. army during the Second Seminole War.

== Politician and landowner ==
In 1798, John Houston served on the Georgia constitutional convention. He would then become a justice of the inferior court of Camden County, Georgia. At some point, John began growing rice and cotton at his plantation, called Refuge, on the Satilla River in Camden County.

In 1803, he purchased land in Florida and, despite living mostly in Georgia, he took an oath of allegiance to the Spanish crown and was deemed a "colonial subject of Spanish Florida."

== The Patriot War of Florida ==
By around 1811, McIntosh was residing at Fort George Island where he grew cotton and operated a sawmill. It was there that he met with George Mathews. Mathews was looking for influential Floridians who could help to overthrow Spanish rule and bring the Florida territory into the U.S.

On March 16, 1812, the Patriot group elected McIntosh as the leader of their group. The group was composed mostly of militia men from Georgia but also had a contingent of U.S. troops from Point Peter, a garrison near the Florida-Georgia border. A day after McIntosh was elected leader, the group marched into and captured the town of Fernandina with the support of 5 Navy gunboats.

After the successful capture of Fernandina, the Patriots established an interim government with the intention that they'd eventually join the United States. On July 17, 1812, a constitution was drafted and 14 members of the Patriot group signed the document including McIntosh, who served as President.

== Later life ==
Following the Patriot War, McIntosh returned to Georgia. Believing that the government owed him for financial losses incurred during the war, McIntosh sued the United States government for around $125,000 (or over $3 million in 2020), an amount of which was eventually awarded to his heirs. Because of the failure of and destruction resulting from the Patriot War, McIntosh, like other leaders in the rebellion, had his reputation tarnished. He fought hard to exonerate his name, both with politicians and the public. For example, in 1823 he submitted an article to the National Intelligencer, in which he argued that he was being unfairly slandered for having caused the war.

During the 1820's, he built the McIntosh Sugarworks.

McIntosh died in 1836.
