= Jack Bailey (Georgia politician) =

American politician (1812–1897)

David Jackson Bailey
- Born: March 11, 1812; Lexington, Georgia, U.S.
- Died: June 14, 1897 (aged 85); Griffin, Georgia, U.S.
- Burial place: Oak Hill Cemetery

David Jackson (Jack) Bailey (March 11, 1812 – June 14, 1897) was an American politician, lawyer and soldier who served in the United States Congress and fought against the United States in the Confederate Army.

== Early life and career ==
Bailey was born in Lexington, Georgia, in 1812 and moved to Jackson, Georgia in 1829. After studying law, Bailey was admitted to the bar in 1831 and became a practicing attorney. He was elected to the Georgia General Assembly before he turned the age of twenty-one; however, he was not permitted to serve because of his age. During the Seminole and Creek Wars, Bailey was a company captain.

In 1835 and 1847, Bailey served in the Georgia House of Representatives. He also served in the Georgia Senate in 1838, 1849, and 1850. He was a Democratic county convention delegate in both 1839 and 1850, and the secretary of the Georgia Senate from 1839 to 1841. Bailey was elected to represent Georgia's 3rd congressional district in 1850 as a State Rights Representative to the 32nd United States Congress. He successfully ran for reelection to that seat as Democrat for the 33rd Congress. He lost his reelection campaign in 1854 for the 34th Congress. Bailey's federal service spanned from March 4, 1851, until March 3, 1855.

== Secession and war ==
Bailey was elected again to the Georgia Senate in 1855 and 1856 and served as president of that body. He returned to practicing law in Jackson was a delegate to The Georgia Secession Convention of 1861—voting in favor of secession and signing Georgia's Ordinance of Secession on January 19, 1861; leading to the American Civil War. During that conflict, Bailey joined the Confederate States Army as a colonel in the 30th Georgia Volunteer Infantry. He moved to Griffin, Georgia, in 1861.

== Postwar ==
He died in Griffin on June 14, 1897, and was buried in Oak Hill Cemetery.

== See also ==
- List of signers of the Georgia Ordinance of Secession

== Notes ==
U.S. House of Representatives
Preceded by Allen Ferdinand Owen	Member of the U.S. House of Representatives from Georgia's 3rd congressional district March 4, 1851 – March 3, 1855	Succeeded by Robert Pleasant Trippe
