= Joseph John Clinch Jr. =

American Revolutionary War soldier

Joseph John Clinch, Jr. (c. 1754–1795) was a colonel in the Edgecomb County Regiment of the North Carolina militia during the American Revolution, a justice of the peace and a representative from Nash County at the meeting of the North Carolina House of Commons in November 1786.

== Early life and political career ==
Joseph John Clinch was born in about 1754. He was the son of Elizabeth Goodrich and Joseph John Clinch of Surry County, Virginia. He moved to Edgecombe County, North Carolina with his family as a child. They lived near Tarboro, North Carolina. He owned a large estate of 1,100 acres and sixteen slaves. He married Mary (Lamont) Clinch with whom he had five children, including Duncan Lamont Clinch. His home was Ard-Lamont, which was located in Edgecombe County but may have been in the part that became Nash County, North Carolina when it was formed in 1777. Joseph was a representative from Nash County in the North Carolina House of Commons that met in Fayetteville from November 20, 1786 to January 6, 1787.

== Military service ==
According to the Colonial Records of North Carolina, John Joseph Clinch was appointed an ensign in the 2nd Regiment of the North Carolina State troops on September 1, 1775. These records indicate that he was appointed as a first lieutenant in the 3rd Regiment in April 1777 and attained the rank of lieutenant colonel. According to family records, he was an aid to General George Washington for a brief period of time.

According to Lewis, there was a Joseph J. Clinch who was a major under Colonel Exum Lewis in the Edgecombe County Regiment from 1778 to 1779 and a colonel in the regiment from the third quarter of 1779 to 1783.

== Death ==
He died in Nash County in 1795 and was buried at the Bellamy Family Cemetery in Gold Rock, North Whittakers Township, Nash County, North Carolina.
