= 1849 Georgia gubernatorial election =

- October 1, 1849
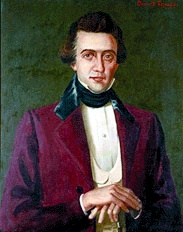

Nominee	George W. Towns	Edward Y. Hill
Party	Democratic	Whig
Popular vote	46,534	43,352
Percentage	51.77%	48.23%
- Results by County; Towns: 50–60% 60–70% 70–80% 80–90% >90% Hill: 50–60% 60–70% 70–80% 80–90% >90%
Governor before election
George W. Towns
Democratic
Elected Governor
George W. Towns
Democratic

The 1849 Georgia gubernatorial election was held on October 1, 1849.

Incumbent Democratic governor George W. Towns was re-elected to a second term in office. The election was decided by 3,182 votes.

== General election ==
=== Candidates ===
==== Democratic ====
- George W. Towns, incumbent governor.

==== Whig ====
- Edward Y. Hill

=== Results ===
1849 Georgia gubernatorial election
Party	Candidate	Votes	%	±%
Democratic	George W. Towns (incumbent)	46,534	51.77%	
Whig	Edward Y. Hill	43,352	48.23%	
