= George W. Towns =

American politician (1801–1854)

George Washington Bonaparte-Towns
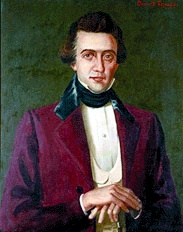

39th Governor of Georgia
- In office November 3, 1847 – November 5, 1851
- Preceded by: George W. Crawford
- Succeeded by: Howell Cobb

Member of the U.S. House of Representatives from Georgia's 3rd district
- In office January 5, 1846 – March 4, 1847
- Preceded by: Vacant (Note: The initial representative-elect Washington Poe never took office.)
- Succeeded by: John W. Jones

Member of the U.S. House of Representatives from Georgia's at-large district
- In office March 4, 1835 – September 1, 1836
- Preceded by: Augustin S. Clayton
- Succeeded by: Julius C. Alford
- In office March 4, 1837 – March 4, 1839
- Preceded by: Julius C. Alford
- Succeeded by: Thomas B. King

Personal details
- Born: May 4, 1801 Wilkes County, Georgia, U.S.
- Died: July 15, 1854 (aged 53) Macon, Georgia, U.S.

George Washington Bonaparte Towns (May 4, 1801 – July 15, 1854) was an American lawyer, legislator, and politician. He served in the United States House of Representatives on three occasions and was the 39th governor of Georgia from 1847 to 1851.

== Early life and education ==
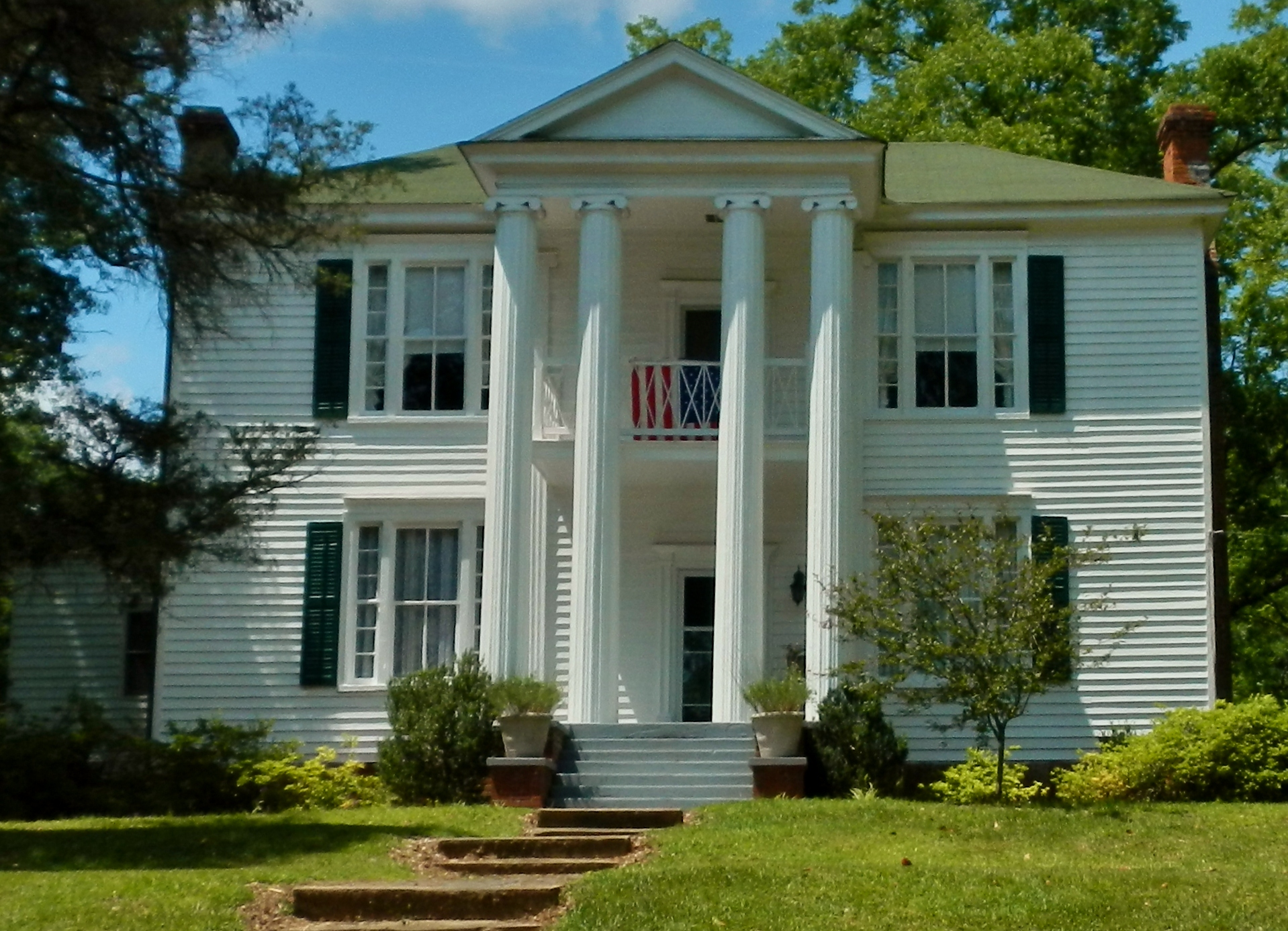
The George W. Towns House in Talbotton, Georgia was added to the National Register of Historic Places on May 7, 1973.

Towns was born in Wilkes County, Georgia to Margaret George Hardwick and John Towns in 1801. His parents were Virginians who had moved to Georgia and settled in Wilkes County.

Shortly after his birth, the Towns family moved throughout Georgia, where he received a small preparatory education. He then began to study medicine in Eatonton, but after his studies were interrupted by an injury, he moved to Montgomery, Alabama, which had recently joined the Union. There, he studied law and, in 1824 was admitted to the Montgomery bar.

== Early career ==
As time went by, Towns continued to gain prominence and in 1826 acquired the Alabama Journal newspaper. During that same year he married his first wife, Margaret Jane Campbell, whose poor health led to her death several days after the marriage ceremony. Following the death of his wife, Towns moved back to Georgia and settled in Talbot County.

In 1828, Towns became one of the original town commissioners of Talbotton, where he also established a law office. During this period Towns served as colonel in the 65th Regiment of the Georgia Militia.

== Political career ==
Towns began his 22-year political career in 1829 as a strong Unionist and opponent of nullification in the Georgia House of Representatives and Georgia Senate.

He was subsequently elected to the United States House of Representatives on three occasions. He served a partial term in the House from 1835 to 1836 and a full term from 1837 to 1839. He served a third term from 1846 to 1847.

He served as the 39th governor of Georgia from 1847 to 1851. On September 23, 1850, Towns asked the General Assembly to allow a special election to send delegates to a state convention to pass judgment on the Compromise of 1850.

Towns’ wife, Mary Winston Jones Towns, was the daughter of John Winston Jones, who served as Speaker of the U.S. House from 1843 to 1845. Towns and Jones served concurrently in the House for a time.

== Death and legacy ==
Towns died in Macon, Georgia on July 15, 1854, and is interred at the Rose Hill Cemetery in that town.

Towns County, Georgia is named in his honor.

== Notes ==
Party political offices
Preceded by Matthew Hall McAllister	Democratic nominee for Governor of Georgia; 1847, 1849	Vacant Title next held by Herschel Vespasian Johnson
U.S. House of Representatives
Preceded by Augustin Smith Clayton	Member of the U.S. House of Representatives from Georgia's at-large congressional district March 4, 1835 – September 1, 1836	Succeeded by Julius Caesar Alford
Preceded by Julius Caesar Alford	Member of the U.S. House of Representatives from Georgia's at-large congressional district March 4, 1837 – March 3, 1839	Succeeded by Thomas Butler King
Preceded by At Large districts	Member of the U.S. House of Representatives from Georgia's 3rd congressional district January 5, 1846 – March 3, 1847	Succeeded by John William Jones
Political offices
Preceded by George W. Crawford	Governor of Georgia; 1847–1851	Succeeded by Howell Cobb
