= John William Jones =

American politician

Member of the U.S. House of Representatives from Georgia's 9th district
- In office March 4, 1847 – March 3, 1849
- Preceded by: George W. Towns
- Succeeded by: Allen F. Owen

Georgia House of Representatives for Monroe County
- In office 1837–1838

Personal details
- Born: April 14, 1806 Rockville, Maryland, U.S.
- Died: April 27, 1871 (aged 65) Decatur, Georgia, U.S.
- Education: Carlisle Seminary; University of Pennsylvania; Jefferson Medical College
- Occupation: Physician, politician
- Profession: farmer, physician, educator, politician

Military service
- Allegiance: Confederate States
- Branch/service: Confederate States Army
- Unit: Medical Department
- Battles/wars: American Civil War

John William Jones (April 14, 1806 – April 27, 1871) was an American politician, planter, educator and medical doctor. Born in Maryland and raised in Kentucky, Jones served one term in the United States Congress representing Georgia's 3rd congressional district, before resuming his careers as a planter and physician in Alabama as well as helped found two female seminaries before returning to Georgia. During the American Civil War, Jones accepted a commission as a surgeon in the Confederate States Army, and postwar taught medicine in Atlanta.

== Early and family life ==
John William Jones was born on April 14, 1806, in Rockville, Montgomery County, Maryland. His family moved west to Nicholas County, Kentucky in 1810. John attended school at Carlisle, the county seat, then moved to Philadelphia, Pennsylvania to study at the University of Pennsylvania (1830-1831). He graduated from the Jefferson Medical College (later, Thomas Jefferson University), in 1836. In the 1850 census, his wife was Charlotte Jones and their eldest son, 19 year old John W. Jones Jr. was studying medicine. Their sons William, Newton and Leonidas and daughters Elizabeth, Tabitha and Louisa also lived in the household, as did 71 year old Winifred Rogers. In 1859, he married widow Ann Belle Olive Vinson (1804-1880), sister of fellow Dr. Young Burt Olive; the couple had no children.

== Career ==
Jones began practicing medicine in Washington County, Tennessee in 1826. He later moved to Monroe, Georgia, and then to Campbellton, Georgia, in 1829. He moved to Culloden, Monroe County, Georgia in 1833.

He was elected to the Georgia House of Representatives in 1837. He moved to Griffin, Spalding County, Georgia, in 1841. In 1846, Jones was elected to the U.S. House of Representatives as a Whig to represent Georgia's 3rd congressional district. He did not run for reelection in 1848, serving one term from March 4, 1847, through March 3, 1849.

After his congressional term ended and another Whig took the seat, Jones moved to Oak Bowery, Chambers County, Alabama and practiced medicine in addition to serving on the board of the Oak Bowery Female College in 1850. The next year, he moved to nearby Auburn, Alabama, and helped found the Auburn Masonic Female College (current-day Auburn High School). In 1856, Jones moved to Atlanta, Georgia, and was a professor at the Atlanta Medical College (modern Emory University) from 1856 to 1862.

During the American Civil War of 1861–1865, Jones served as a surgeon in the Confederate States Army. After the war, he returned to the Atlanta Medical College and remained with that faculty from 1865 until 1870.

== Death ==
He died on April 27, 1871, in Decatur, Georgia. He was buried in Atlanta's Oakland Cemetery.

U.S. House of Representatives
Preceded by George W. Towns	Member of the U.S. House of Representatives from Georgia's 3rd congressional district March 4, 1847 – March 3, 1849	Succeeded by Allen Ferdinand Owen
