= List of signers of the Georgia Ordinance of Secession =

Ordinance of Secession
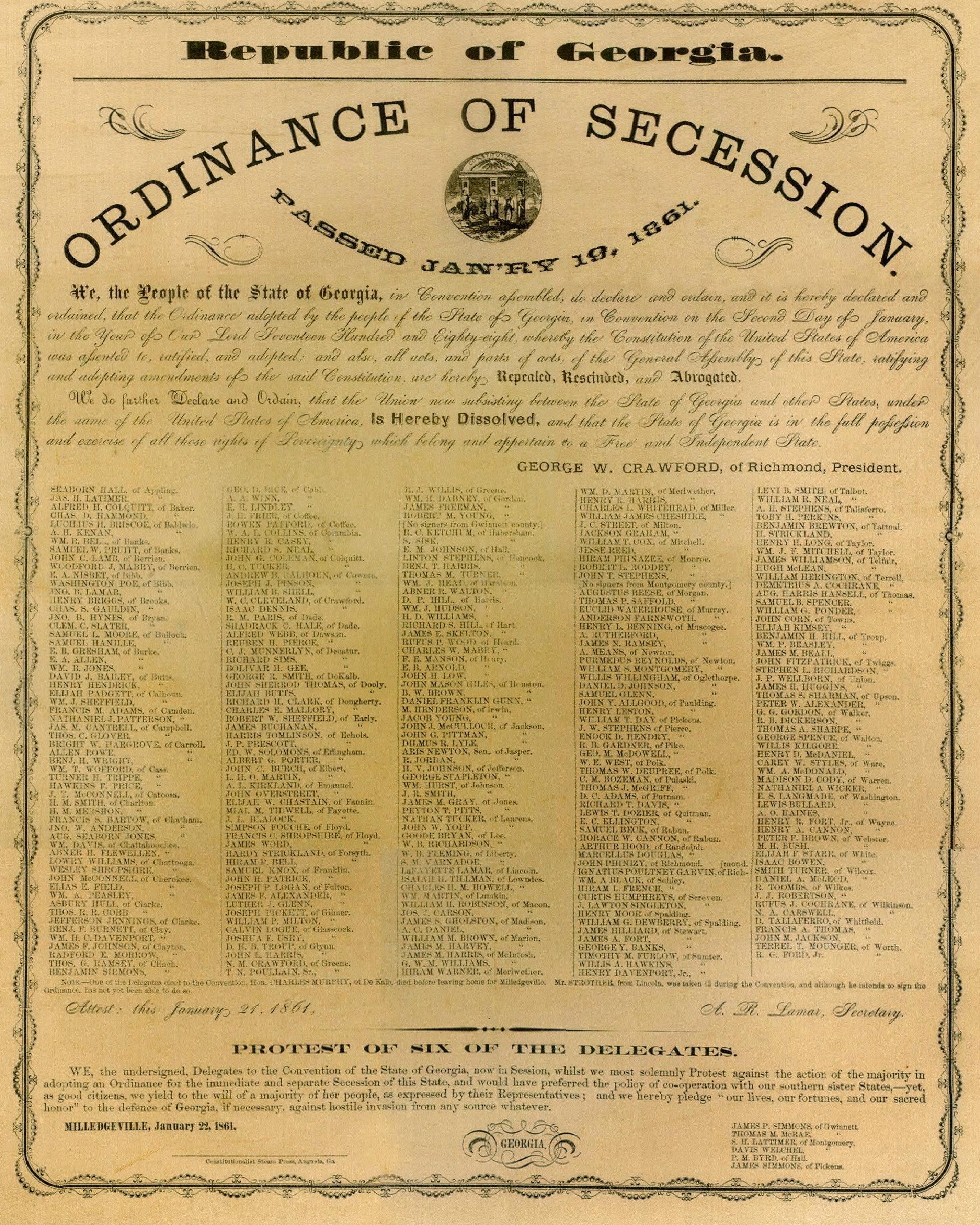
- Facsimile of the 1861 Ordinance of Secession signed by 293 delegates to the Georgia Secession Convention at the statehouse in Milledgeville, Georgia January 21, 1861
- Created: c. January 20, 1861
- Ratified: Put to the vote on January 19, 1861 – 208 yeas 89 nays; signed on January 21, 1861, by 293 delegates; enacted January 22, 1861
- Location: Engrossed copy: University of Georgia Libraries, Hargrett Library
- Author(s): George W. Crawford et al. Engrosser: H. J. G. Williams
- Signatories: 293 delegates to The Georgia Secession Convention of 1861
- Purpose: To announce Georgia's formal intent to secede from the Union.

Georgia's Ordinance of Secession was adopted at the Georgia Secession Convention of 1861. It was put to the vote on January 19, 1861; concluding at 2:00 p.m. (the vote was 208 in favor of immediate secession with 89 opposed). Prior to signing the ordinance, Eugenius A. Nisbet tabled a motion suggesting that the ordinance should be signed by all of the convention's delegates, irrespective of their vote – as a pledge of support and to signal a unified purpose. Nisbet's motion passed, and at 12 o'clock M., Convention President, George W. Crawford, announced that the hour had arrived for signing the Ordinance of Secession.

Crawford signed the ordinance; becoming its first signatory, and then he instructed Secretary Lamar to "call the delegates forward, by county, to sign the ordinance." Some delegates withheld signing; with six delegates insisting that a protest be incorporated into the ordinance. The list below shows the delegate's name, (as it was recorded on the convention's roster), the county which they represent, whether they had signed the ordinance or not, and how they had voted when the ordinance passed.

== List ==
=== District delegates ===
George Walker Crawford
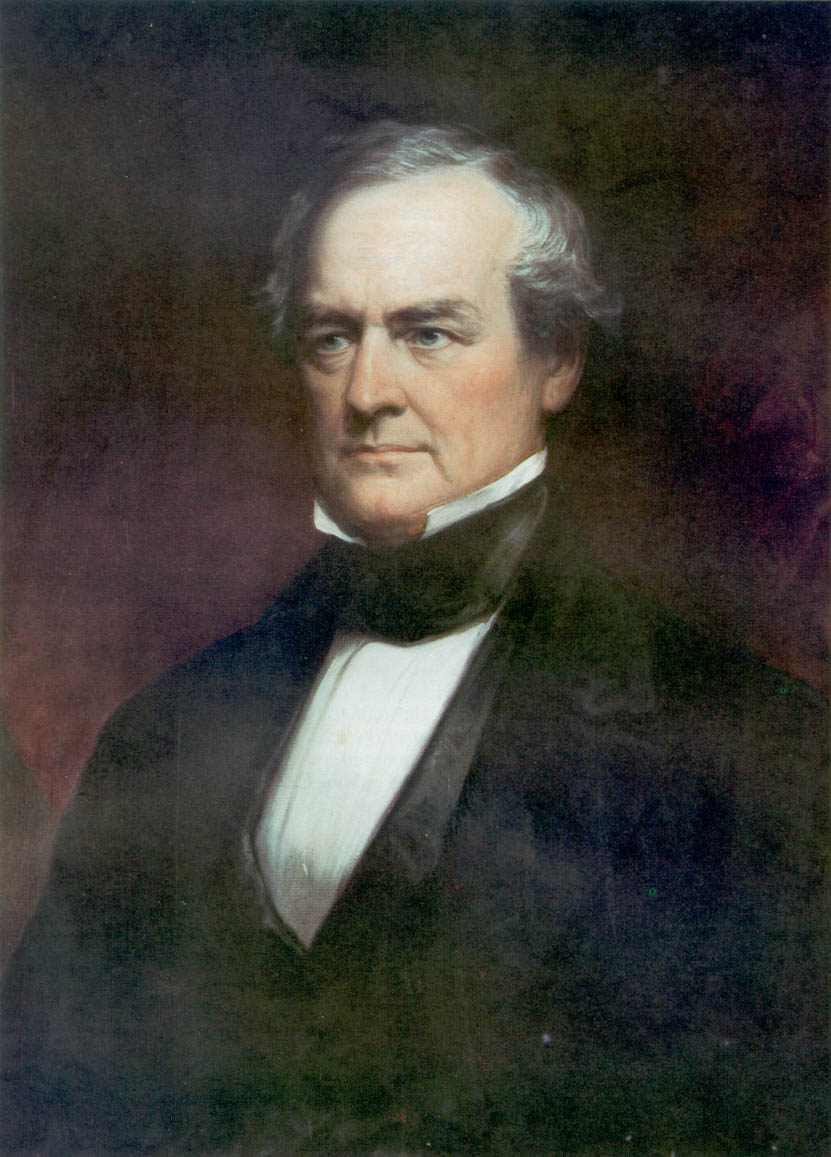
- Portrait of George W. Crawford, elected Permanent President of the Georgia Secession Convention; leading the delegation as the first to sign Georgia's Ordinance of Secession.

Robert Toombs
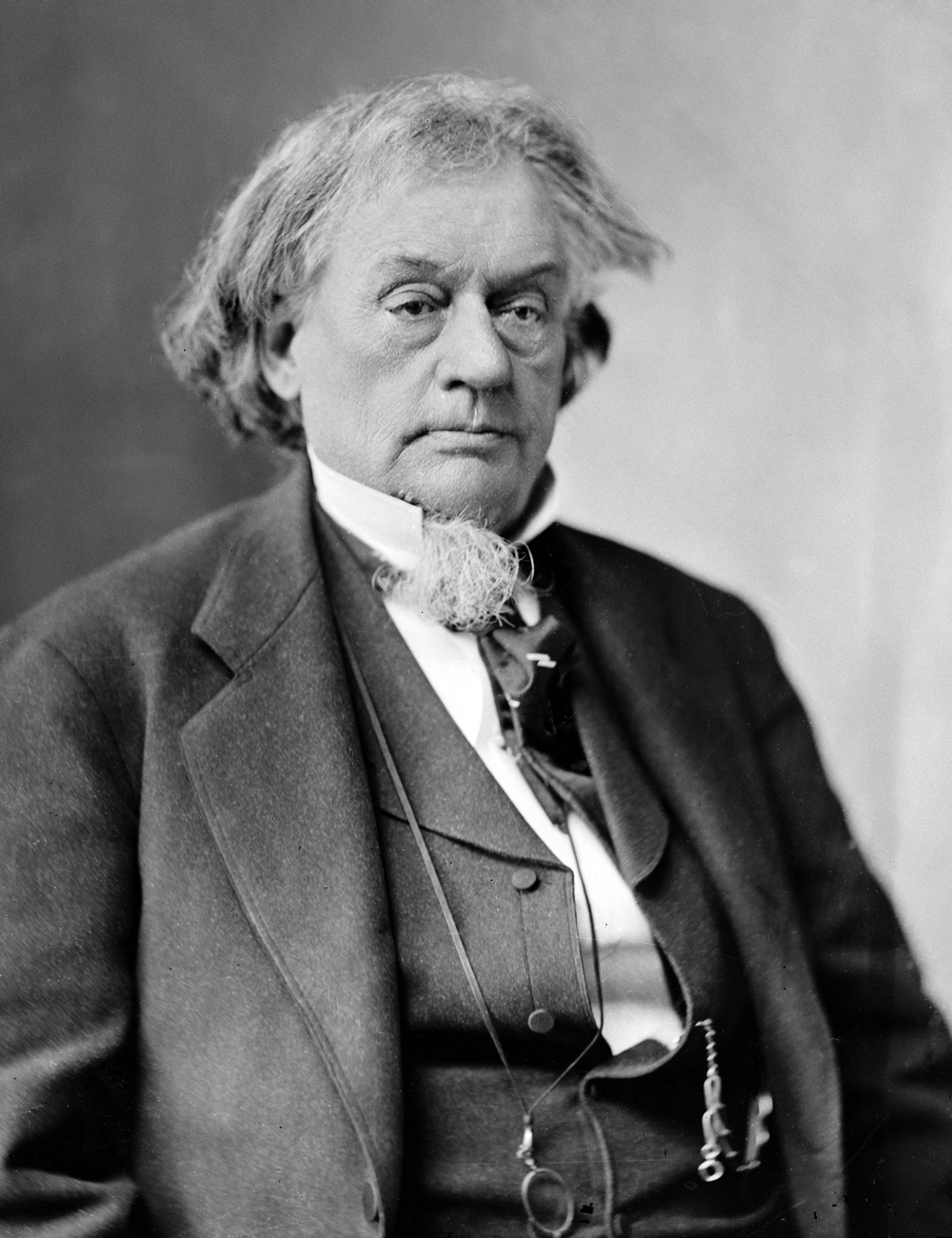
- Portrait of Robert Toombs, elected a delegate at-large to the Southern Convention in Montgomery, Alabama, February 4, 1861.

Howell Cobb
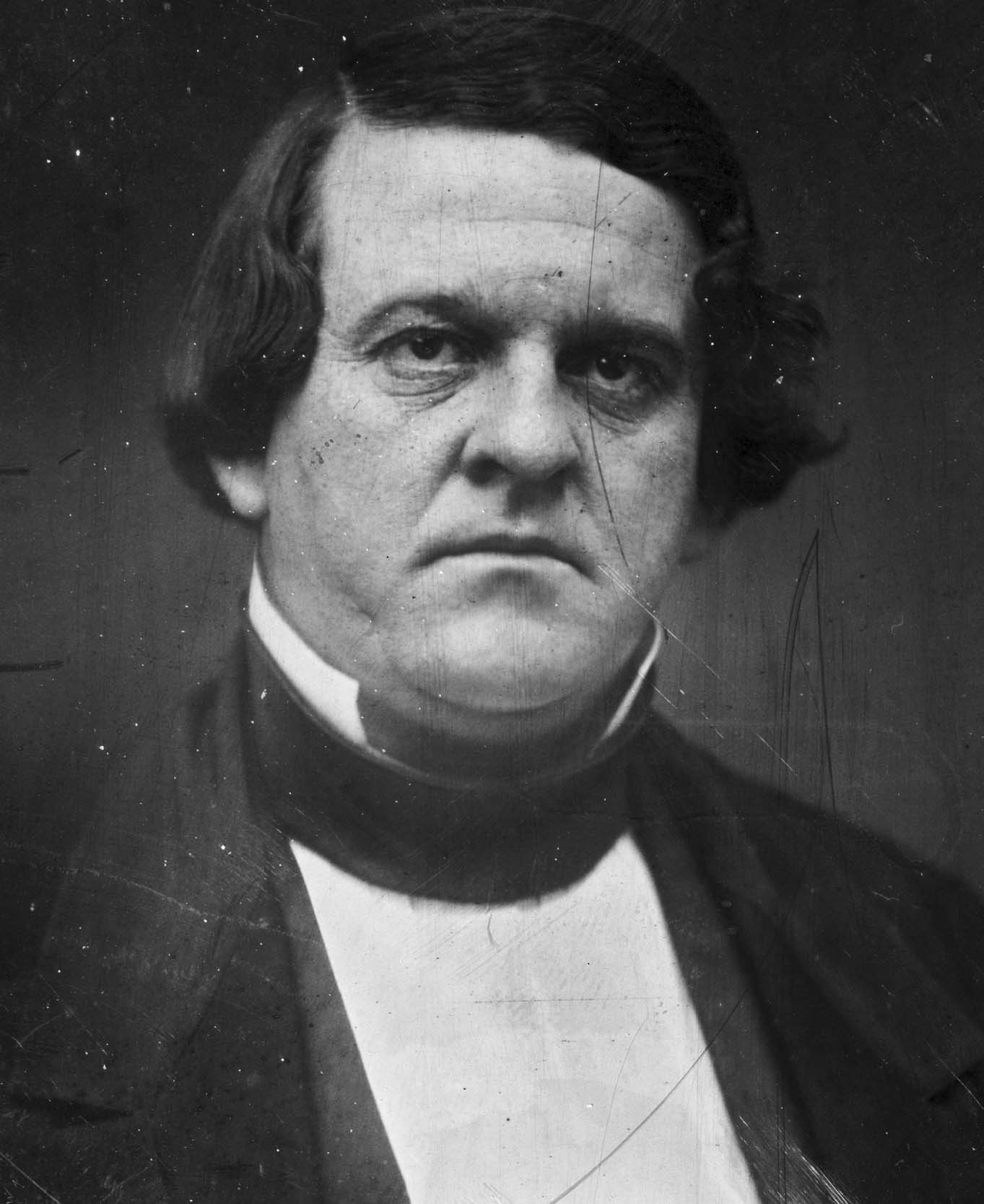
- Portrait of Howell Cobb, elected a delegate at-large to the Southern Convention in Montgomery, Alabama, February 4, 1861.

Francis S. Bartow
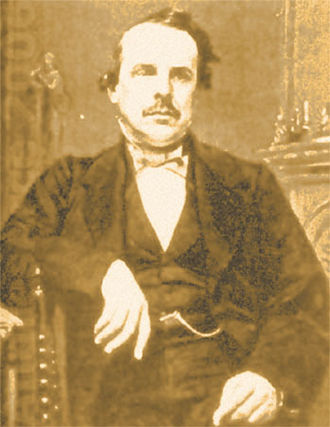
- Portrait of Francis S. Bartow, elected a delegate from district 1 to the Southern Convention in Montgomery, Alabama, February 4, 1861—Bartow died July 21, 1861, at First Battle of Manassas.

Martin J. Crawford
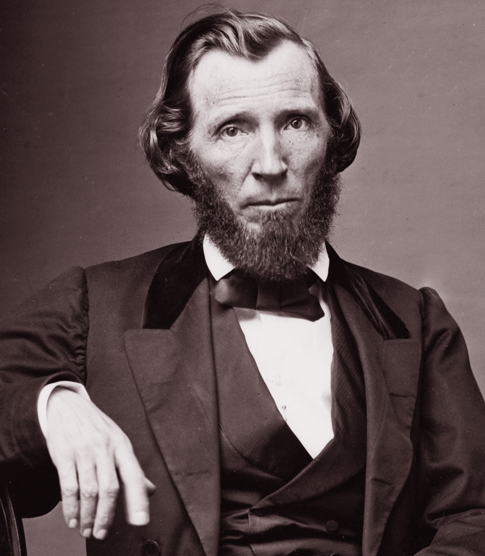
- Portrait of Martin J. Crawford, elected a delegate from district 2 to the Southern Convention in Montgomery, Alabama, February 4, 1861.

Eugenius A. Nisbet
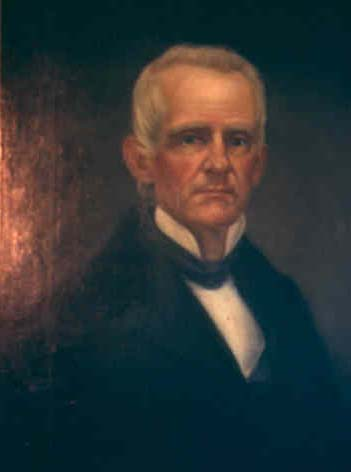
- Portrait of Eugenius A. Nisbet, elected a delegate from district 3 to the Southern Convention in Montgomery, Alabama, February 4, 1861.

Benjamin Harvey Hill
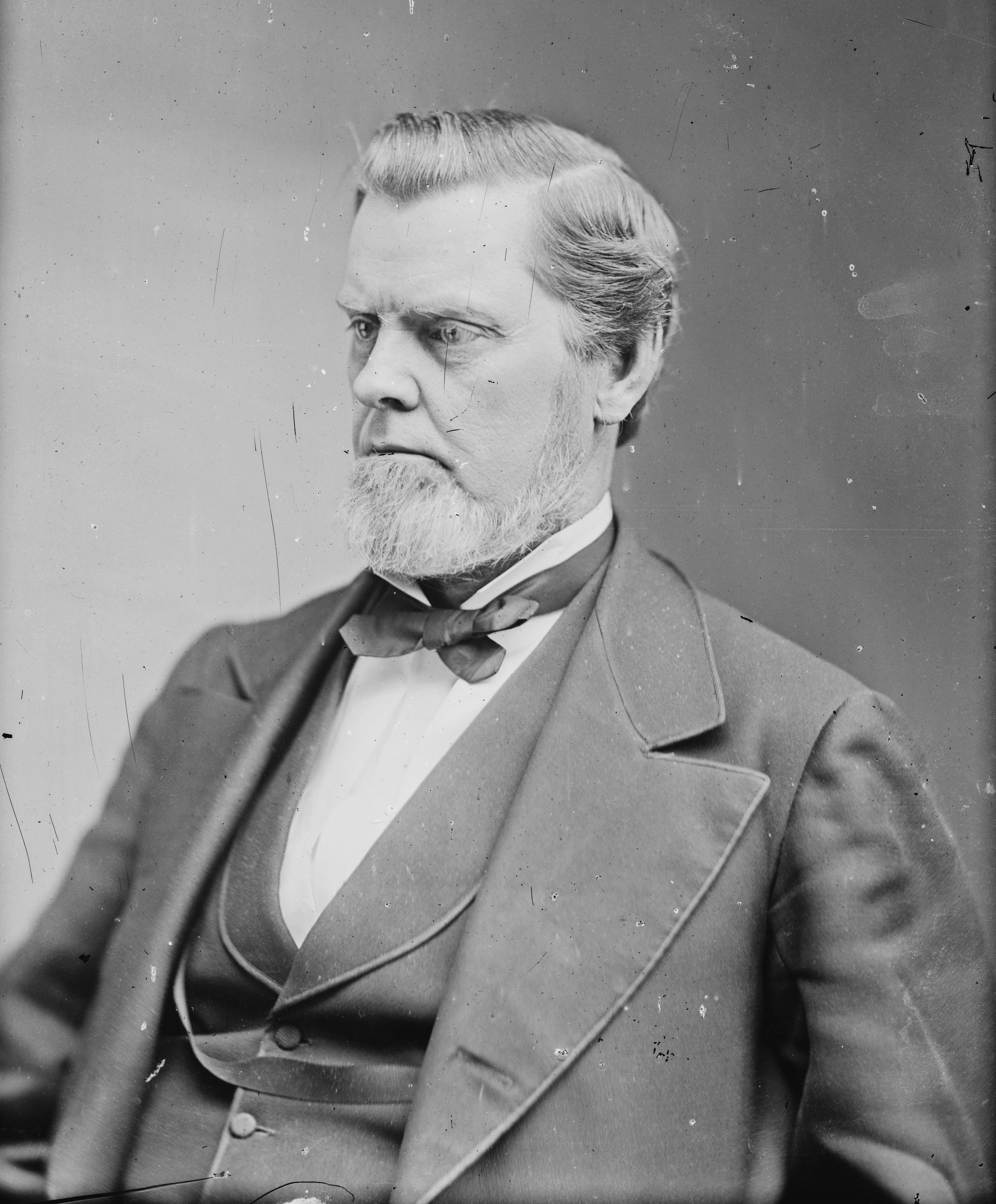
- Portrait of Benjamin H. Hill, elected a delegate from district 4 to the Southern Convention in Montgomery, Alabama, February 4, 1861.

Augustus Romaldus Wright
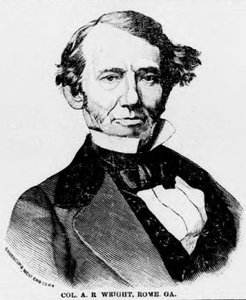
- Portrait of Augustus R. Wright, elected a delegate from district 5 to the Southern Convention in Montgomery, Alabama, February 4, 1861.

Thomas Reade Rootes Cobb
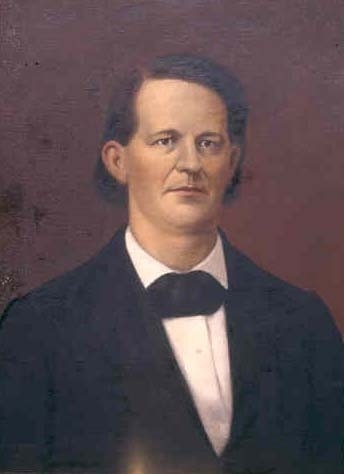
- Portrait of Thomas Reade Rootes Cobb, elected a delegate from district 6 to the Southern Convention in Montgomery, Alabama, February 4, 1861-T.R.R. Cobb died at the Battle of Fredericksburg December 13, 1862.

Augustus H. Kenan
- Portrait of Augustus H. Kenan, elected a delegate from district 7 to the Southern Convention in Montgomery, Alabama, February 4, 1861.

Alexander H. Stephens
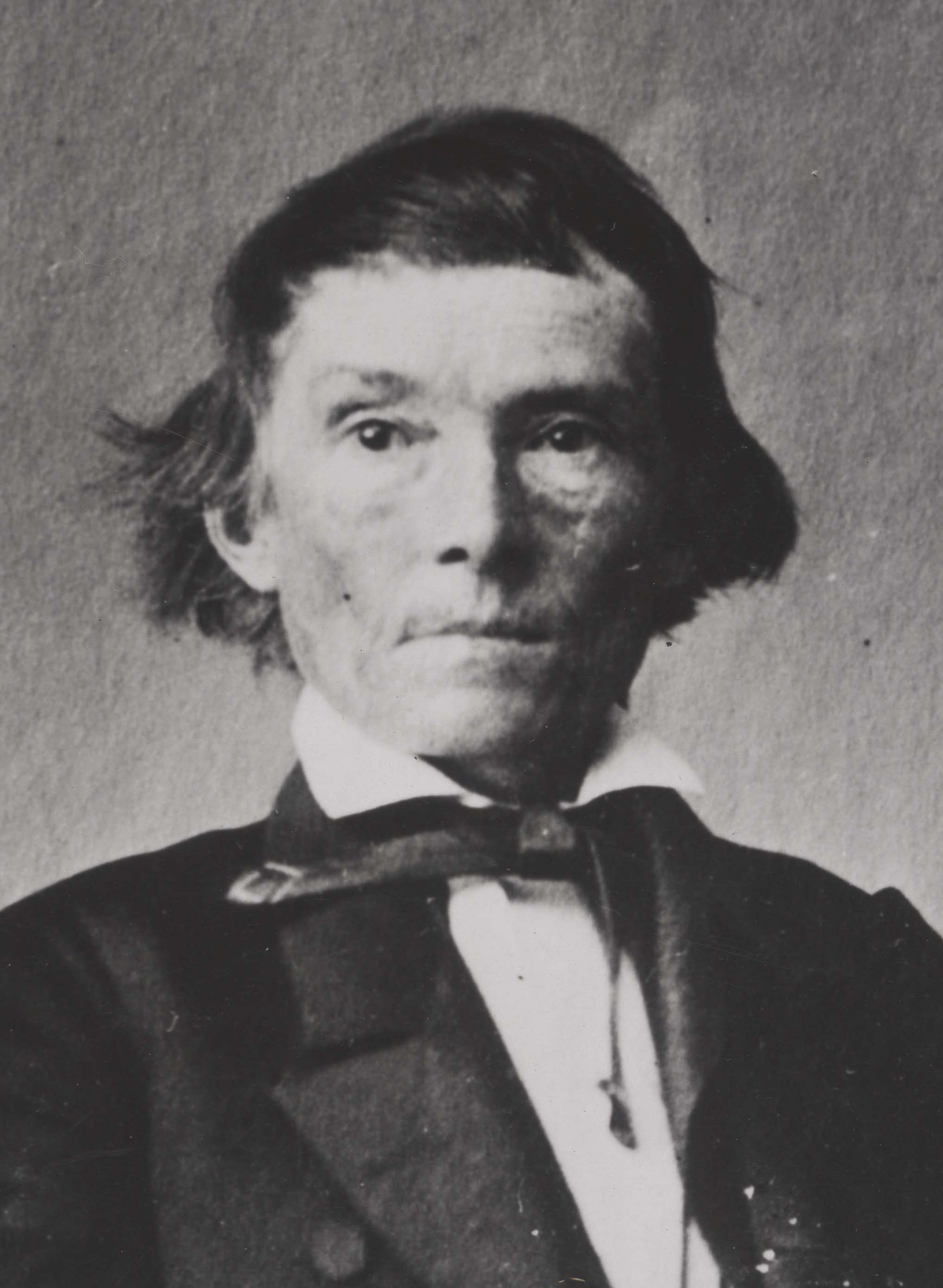
- Portrait of Alexander H. Stephens, elected a delegate from district 8 to the Southern Convention in Montgomery, Alabama, February 4, 1861.

=== County delegates ===
Delegate	County	Sign	Vote
Seaborn Hall	Appling County	Yes	Yes
J. H. Latimer	Appling County	Yes	Yes
W. R. Bell	Banks County	Yes	No
S. W. Pruett	Banks County	Yes	Yes
A. H. Colquitt	Baker County	Yes	Yes
C. D. Hammond	Baker County	Yes	Yes
A. H. Kenan	Baldwin County	Yes	No
L. H. Briscoe	Baldwin County	Yes	Yes
W. J. Mabry	Berrien County	Yes	Yes
J. C. Lamb	Berrien County	Yes	Yes
Washington Poe	Bibb County	Yes	Yes
John B. Lamar	Bibb County	Yes	Yes
E. A. Nisbet	Bibb County	Yes	Yes
C. S. Gaulden	Brooks County	Yes	Yes
Henry Briggs	Brooks County	Yes	Yes
C. C. Slater	Bryan County	Yes	Yes
J. P. Hines	Bryan County	Yes	Yes
S. L. Moore	Bulloch County	Yes	Yes
Samuel Harville	Bulloch County	Yes	Yes
E. A. Allen	Burke County	Yes	Yes
E. B. Gresham	Burke County	Yes	Yes
W. B. Jones	Burke County	Yes	Yes
D. J. Bailey	Butts County	Yes	Yes
Henry Hendricks	Butts County	Yes	Yes
N. J. Patterson	Camden County	Yes	Yes
F. M. Adams	Camden County	Yes	Yes
J. M. Cantrell	Campbell County	Yes	Yes
T. C. Glover	Campbell County	Yes	Yes
W. G. Sheffield	Calhoun County	Yes	Yes
E. Padgett	Calhoun County	Yes	Yes
B. W. Wright	Carroll County	Yes	Yes
B. W. Hargrave	Carroll County	Yes	Yes
Allen Rowe	Carroll County	Yes	Yes
W. T. Wofford	Cass County	Yes	No
H. F. Price	Cass County	Yes	No
T. H. Trippe	Cass County	Yes	No
Presley Yates	Catoosa County	No	No
J. T. McConnell	Catoosa County	Yes	Yes
F. M. Smith	Charlton County	Yes	No
H. M. Mershon	Charlton County	Yes	Yes
F. S. Bartow	Chatham County	Yes	Yes
A. S. Jones	Chatham County	Yes	Yes
John W. Anderson	Chatham County	Yes	Yes
A. H. Flewellen	Chattahoochee County	Yes	Yes
William Davis	Chattahoochee County	Yes	Yes
Wesley Shropshire	Chattooga County	Yes	No
L. Williams	Chattooga County	Yes	No
W. A. Teasley	Cherokee County	Yes	Yes
E. E. Fields	Cherokee County	Yes	Yes
John McConnell	Cherokee County	Yes	Yes
T.R.R. Cobb	Clarke County	Yes	Yes
Asbury Hull	Clarke County	Yes	Yes
Jefferson Jennings	Clarke County	Yes	Yes
R. E. Morrow	Clayton County	Yes	No
James F. Johnston	Clayton County	Yes	Yes
W. H. C. Davenport	Clay County	Yes	Yes
B. F. Burnett	Clay County	Yes	Yes
Benjamin Sirmons	Clinch County	Yes	Yes
F. G. Ramsey	Clinch County	Yes	Yes
G. D. Rice	Cobb County	Yes	Yes
A. A. Winn	Cobb County	Yes	Yes
E. H. Lindley	Cobb County	Yes	Yes
Rowan Pafford	Coffee County	Yes	No
J. H. Frier	Coffee County	Yes	No
W. A. S. Collins	Columbia County	Yes	Yes
H. R. Casey	Columbia County	Yes	Yes
R. S. Neal	Columbia County	Yes	Yes
H. C. Tucker	Colquitt County	Yes	No
John G. Coleman	Colquitt County	Yes	Yes
A. B. Calhoun	Coweta County	Yes	Yes
J. J. Pinson	Coweta County	Yes	Yes
W. B. Shell	Coweta County	Yes	Yes
W. C. Cleveland	Crawford County	Yes	Yes
Isaac Dennis	Crawford County	Yes	Yes
S. C. Hale	Dade County	Yes	No
R. M. Pariss	Dade County	Yes	No
Alfred Webb	Dawson County	Yes	No
R. H. Pierce	Dawson County	Yes	No
Richard Simms	Decatur County	Yes	Yes
C. J. Munnerlyn	Decatur County	Yes	Yes
B. H. Gee	Decatur County	Yes	Yes
Charles Murphy	De Kalb County	No	Died
G. K. Smith	De Kalb County	Yes	No
John S. Thomas	Dooly County	Yes	Yes
Elijah Butts	Dooly County	Yes	Yes
Richard H. Clark	Dougherty County	Yes	Yes
C. E. Mallary	Dougherty County	Yes	Yes
R. W. Sheffield	Early County	Yes	Yes
James Buchanan	Early County	Yes	Yes
Harris Tomlinson	Echols County	Yes	Yes
J. B. Prescott	Echols County	Yes	Yes
E. W. Solomons	Effingham County	Yes	Yes
A. G. Porter	Effingham County	Yes	Yes
J. C. Burch	Elbert County	Yes	Yes
L. H. O. Martin	Elbert County	Yes	Yes
A. L. Kirkland	Emanuel County	Yes	No
John Overstreet	Emanuel County	Yes	No
W. C. Fain	Fannin County	No	No
E. W. Chastain	Fannin County	Yes	Yes
M. M. Tidwell	Fayette County	Yes	Yes
J. L. Blalock	Fayette County	Yes	Yes
James Ward	Floyd County	Yes	Yes
Simpson Fouche	Floyd County	Yes	Yes
F. C. Shropshire	Floyd County	Yes	Yes
Hardy Strickland	Forsyth County	Yes	Yes
H.P. Bell	Forsyth County	Yes	No
John H. Patrick	Franklin County	Yes	No
Samuel Knox	Franklin County	Yes	No
J. F. Alexander	Fulton County	Yes	Yes
L. J. Glenn	Fulton County	Yes	Yes
J. P. Logan	Fulton County	Yes	Yes
Joshua F. Usry	Glascock County	Yes	Yes
Calvin Logue	Glascock County	Yes	Yes
Joseph Pickett	Gilmer County	Yes	No
W. P. Milton	Gilmer County	Yes	No
John L. Harris	Glynn County	Yes	Yes
H. B. Troup	Glynn County	Yes	Yes
W. H. Dabney	Gordon County	Yes	Yes
James Freeman	Gordon County	Yes	No
R. M. Young	Gordon County	Yes	Yes
N. M. Crawford	Greene County	Yes	Yes
R. J. Willis	Greene County	Yes	Yes
T. N. Poullain	Greene County	Yes	Yes
R. D. Winn	Gwinnett County	No	No
J. P. Simmons	Gwinnett County	Yes	No
T. P. Hudson	Gwinnett County	No	No
R. C. Ketchum	Habersham County	Yes	Yes
Singleton Sisk	Habersham County	Yes	Yes
E. M. Johnson	Hall County	Yes	No
P. M. Byrd	Hall County	Yes	No
Davis Whelchel	Hall County	Yes	No
Linton Stephens	Hancock County	Yes	No
B. T. Harris	Hancock County	Yes	Yes
T. M. Turner	Hancock County	Yes	Yes
W. J. Head	Haralson County	Yes	Yes
A. R. Walton	Haralson County	Yes	Yes
D. P. Hill	Harris County	Yes	Yes
W. J. Hudson	Harris County	Yes	Yes
H. D. Williams	Harris County	Yes	Yes
R. S. Hill	Hart County	Yes	Yes
J. E. Skelton	Hart County	Yes	Yes
R. P. Wood	Heard County	Yes	No
C. W. Mabry	Heard County	Yes	No
F. E. Manson	Henry County	Yes	No
E. B. Arnold	Henry County	Yes	No
J. H. Low	Henry County	Yes	Yes
J. M. Giles	Houston County	Yes	Yes
D. F. Gunn	Houston County	Yes	Yes
B.W. Brown	Houston County	Yes	Yes
M. Henderson	Irwin County	Yes	Yes
Jacob Young	Irwin County	Yes	No
J. J. McCulloch	Jackson County	Yes	Yes
J. G. Pitman	Jackson County	Yes	Yes
D. R. Lyle	Jackson County	Yes	Yes
Aris Newton	Jasper County	Yes	No
Reuben Jordan Jr.	Jasper County	Yes	No
H. V. Johnson	Jefferson County	Yes	No
George Stapleton	Jefferson County	Yes	No
William Hust	Johnson County	Yes	No
J. R. Smith	Johnson County	Yes	No
James M. Gray	Jones County	Yes	Yes
P. T. Pitts	Jones County	Yes	Yes
Nathan Tucker	Laurens County	Yes	Yes
J. W. Yopp	Laurens County	Yes	Yes
W. B. Richardson	Lee County	Yes	Yes
Goode Bryan	Lee County	Yes	Yes
W. B. Fleming	Liberty County	Yes	Yes
S. M. Varnadoe	Liberty County	Yes	Yes
La Fayette Lamar	Lincoln County	Yes	Yes
C. R. Strother	Lincoln County	No	Sick
C. H. M. Howell	Lowndes County	Yes	Yes
Isaiah Tilman	Lowndes County	Yes	Yes
Benjamin Hamilton	Lumpkin County	No	No
William Martin	Lumpkin County	Yes	No
J. S. Gholston	Madison County	Yes	Yes
A. C. Daniel	Madison County	Yes	Yes
W. H. Robinson	Macon County	Yes	Yes
J. H. Carson	Macon County	Yes	Yes
W. M. Brown	Marion County	Yes	Yes
J. M. Harvey	Marion County	Yes	Yes
J. M. Harris	McIntosh County	Yes	Yes
G. W. M. Williams	McIntosh County	Yes	Yes
H. R. Harris	Meriwether County	Yes	Yes
W. D. Martin	Meriwether County	Yes	Yes
Hiram Warner	Meriwether County	Yes	No
W. J. Cheshier	Miller County	Yes	Yes
C. L. Whitehead	Miller County	Yes	Yes
Jackson Graham	Milton County	Yes	No
J. C. Street	Milton County	Yes	No
William T. Cox	Mitchell County	Yes	Yes
Jesse Reed	Mitchell County	Yes	Yes
R.L. Roddey	Monroe County	Yes	Yes
Hiriam Phinizy Jr.	Monroe County	Yes	No
J. T. Stephens	Monroe County	Yes	Yes
T. M. McRae	Montgomery County	Yes	No
S. H. Latimer	Montgomery County	Yes	No
Thomas P. Saffold	Morgan County	Yes	Yes
Augustus Reese	Morgan County	Yes	Yes
Anderson Farnsworth	Murray County	Yes	No
Euclid Waterhouse	Murray County	Yes	No
J. N. Ramsey	Muscogee County	Yes	Yes
Henry L. Benning	Muscogee County	Yes	Yes
A. S. Rutherford	Muscogee County	Yes	Yes
W. S. Montgomery	Newton County	Yes	Yes
Alexander Means	Newton County	Yes	Yes
Purmedus Reynolds	Newton County	Yes	No
D. D. Johnson	Oglethorpe County	Yes	Yes
Samuel Glenn	Oglethorpe County	Yes	Yes
Willis Willingham	Oglethorpe County	Yes	No
Henry Lester	Paulding County	Yes	Yes
J. Y. Algood	Paulding County	Yes	Yes
James Simmons	Pickens County	Yes	No
W. T. Day	Pickens County	Yes	No
E. D. Hendry	Pierce County	Yes	Yes
J. W. Stephens	Pierce County	Yes	Yes
R. B. Gardner	Pike County	Yes	Yes
G. M. McDowell	Pike County	Yes	Yes
W. E. West	Polk County	Yes	No
T. W. Dupree	Polk County	Yes	No
T.J. McGriff	Pulaski County	Yes	Yes
C. M. Bozeman	Pulaski County	Yes	Yes
R. T. Davis	Putnam County	Yes	No
D. R. Adams	Putnam County	Yes	Yes
E. C. Ellington	Quitman County	Yes	Yes
L. P. Dozier	Quitman County	Yes	Yes
Samuel Beck	Rabun County	Yes	No
H. W. Cannon	Rabun County	Yes	No
Marcellus Douglas	Randolph County	Yes	Yes
Arthur Hood	Randolph County	Yes	Yes
George W. Crawford	Richmond County	Yes	Yes
J. Phinizy Sr.	Richmond County	Yes	Yes
J. P. Garvin	Richmond County	Yes	Yes
H. L. French	Schley County	Yes	Yes
W. A. Black	Schley County	Yes	Yes
C. Humphries	Screven County	Yes	Yes
J. L. Singleton	Screven County	Yes	Yes
W. G. Dewberry	Spalding County	Yes	Yes
Henry Moor	Spalding County	Yes	Yes
James A. Fort	Stewart County	Yes	Yes
James Hilliard	Stewart County	Yes	Yes
G. Y. Banks	Stewart County	Yes	Yes
W. A. Hawkins	Sumter County	Yes	Yes
T. M. Furlow	Sumter County	Yes	Yes
Henry Davenport	Sumter County	Yes	Yes
W. R. Neal	Talbot County	Yes	No
L. B. Smith	Talbot County	Yes	Yes
Alexander H. Stephens	Taliaferro County	Yes	No
S. H. Perkins	Taliaferro County	Yes	No
Benjamin Brewton	Tattnall County	Yes	No
Henry Strickland	Tattnall County	Yes	No
W. J. F. Mitchell	Taylor County	Yes	No
H. H. Long	Taylor County	Yes	Yes
H. McLean	Telfair County	Yes	No
James Williamson	Telfair County	Yes	No
William Harrington	Terrell County	Yes	No
D. A. Cochran	Terrell County	Yes	No
A. H. Hansell	Thomas County	Yes	Yes
S. B. Spencer	Thomas County	Yes	Yes
W. G. Ponder	Thomas County	Yes	Yes
John Corn	Towns County	Yes	No
Elijah Kimsey	Towns County	Yes	No
B. H. Hill	Troup County	Yes	Yes
W. P. Beasley	Troup County	Yes	Yes
J. M. Beall	Troup County	Yes	Yes
John Fitzpatrick	Twiggs County	Yes	Yes
S. L. Richardson	Twiggs County	Yes	Yes
J. H. Huggins	Union County	Yes	No
J. P. Welborn	Union County	Yes	No
P. W. Alexander	Upson County	Yes	No
T. S. Sherman	Upson County	Yes	No
G. G. Gordon	Walker County	Yes	No
R. B. Dickerson	Walker County	Yes	No
T. A. Sharpe	Walker County	Yes	No
George Spence	Walton County	Yes	Yes
Willis Kilgore	Walton County	Yes	No
H. D. McDaniel	Walton County	Yes	Yes
W. A. McDonald	Ware County	Yes	Yes
C. W. Styles	Ware County	Yes	Yes
M. D. Cody	Warren County	Yes	Yes
N. A. Wicker	Warren County	Yes	Yes
Henry R. Fort	Wayne County	Yes	Yes
H. A. Cannon	Wayne County	Yes	Yes
E. S. Langmade	Washington County	Yes	Yes
Lewis Bullard	Washington County	Yes	Yes
A. C. Harris	Washington County	Yes	Yes
P.F. Brown	Webster County	Yes	Yes
M. H. Bush	Webster County	Yes	Yes
Isaac Bowen	White County	Yes	Yes
E. F. Starr	White County	Yes	No
J. M. Jackson	Whitfield County	Yes	No
F. A. Thomas	Whitfield County	Yes	Yes
Dickerson Taliaferro	Whitfield County	Yes	No
D. A. McLeod	Wilcox County	Yes	Yes
Smith Turner	Wilcox County	Yes	Yes
Robert Toombs	Wilkes County	Yes	Yes
J. J. Robertson	Wilkes County	Yes	Yes
N. A. Carswell	Wilkinson County	Yes	No
R. J. Cochran	Wilkinson County	Yes	No
R. G. Ford Sr.	Worth County	Yes	Yes
T.T. Mounger	Worth County	Yes	Yes
