= Roger Lawson Gamble =

American politician (1787–1847)

Roger Lawson Gambles

Member of the U.S. House of Representatives from Georgia's at-large district
- In office March 4, 1841 – March 3, 1843
- Preceded by: Hines Holt
- Succeeded by: John Millen
- In office March 4, 1833 – March 3, 1835
- Preceded by: Wiley Thompson
- Succeeded by: James C. Terrell

Member of the Georgia House of Representatives
- In office 1814–1815

Personal details
- Born: 1787 near Louisville, Georgia
- Died: December 20, 1847 (aged 59–60) Augusta, Georgia, U.S.
- Resting place: Old Capitol Cemetery, Louisville, Georgia, U.S.
- Party: Whig
- Occupation: Politician, lawyer

Military service
- Allegiance: United States
- Battles/wars: War of 1812

Roger Lawson Gamble (1787 – December 20, 1847) was a United States representative and lawyer from the U.S. state of Georgia.

Born near Louisville, in 1787, Gamble studied law, was admitted to the state bar in 1815 and began practicing law in Louisville. He was an officer in the War of 1812. Gamble served in the Georgia House of Representatives in 1814 and 1815.

Gamble was elected in 1832 as a Jacksonian to the 23rd United States Congress and served one term from March 4, 1833, until March 3, 1835, as he unsuccessfully ran for reelection in 1834. He was elected to the U.S. House again as a Whig to represent Georgia in the 27th U.S. Congress and served one term from March 4, 1841, until March 3, 1843, as his lost his reelection bid for a second term in that seat in 1842. From 1845 to 1847, Gamble served as a judge of the superior court of Georgia. He died in Augusta, Georgia, on December 20, 1847, and was buried in Old Capitol Cemetery in Louisville.

U.S. House of Representatives
Preceded by Wiley Thompson	Member of the U.S. House of Representatives from Georgia's at-large congressional district March 4, 1833 – March 3, 1835	Succeeded by James C. Terrell
Preceded by Hines Holt	Member of the U.S. House of Representatives from Georgia's at-large congressional district March 4, 1841 – March 3, 1843	Succeeded by John Millen
