= St. Marys Historic District (Georgia) =

Historic district in Georgia, United States

- U.S. National Register of Historic Places
- U.S. Historic district
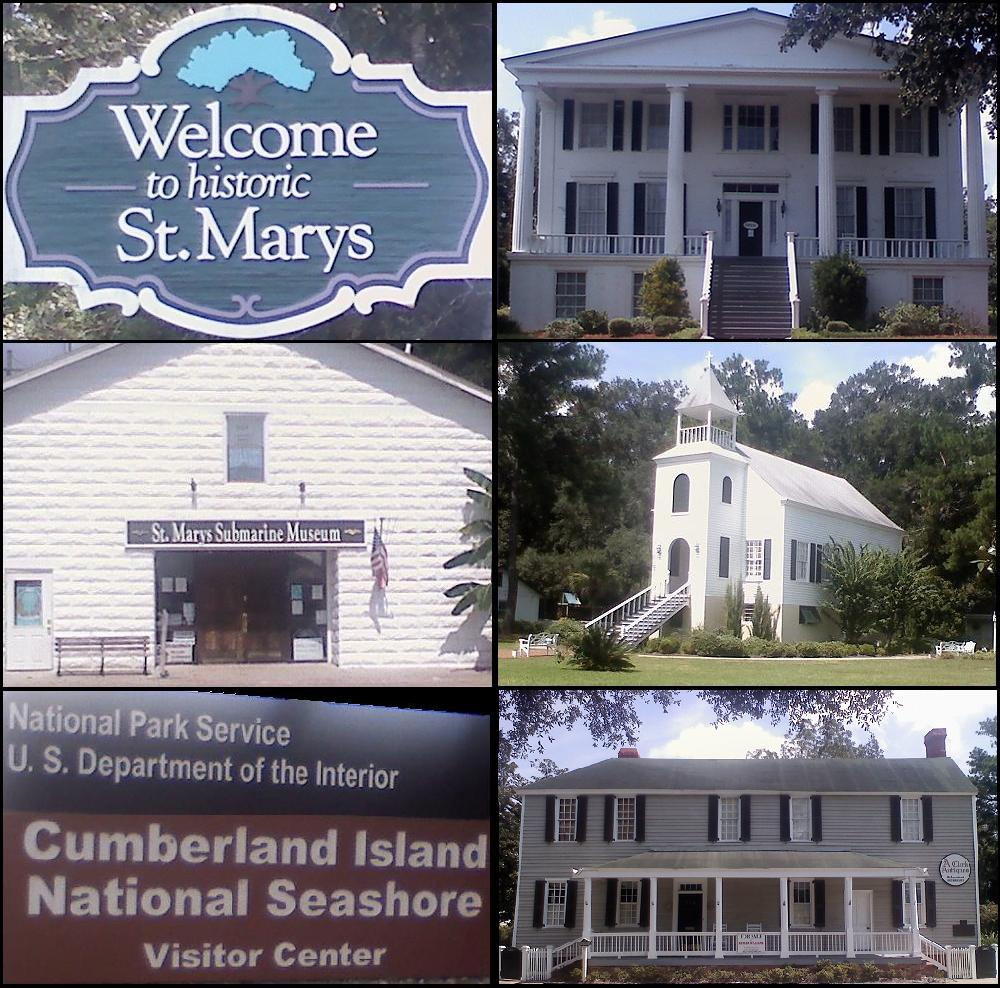
- St. Marys, Georgia

- Location within Georgia Location within the United States
- Location: Roughly bounded by Waterfront Rd., Norris, Alexander, and Oak Grove Cemetery. St. Marys, Georgia
- Coordinates: 30.72323°N 81.54792°W
- Area: 230 acres (93 ha)
- Built: mid-1500s
- Architectural style: Gothic, Queen Anne, et al.
- NRHP reference No.: 76000609
- Added to NRHP: May 13, 1976

St. Marys Historic District was listed on the National Register of Historic Places on May 13, 1976 and is located in St. Marys, Georgia. The city was first settled in the mid-16th century by the Spanish.

== Historical significance ==
The St. Marys historic district is roughly bounded by Waterfront Rd., Norris Alexander, and Oak Grove Cemetery. It contains portions of the original 18th-century town containing residential, commercial, and religious buildings dating from the late 18th-early 20th century. Notable features include the waterfront area, the early cemetery, a bell cast by Paul and Joseph Warren Revere, and a memorial oak planted the day of George Washington's burial. Established by an act of the state legislature on December 5, 1792, and was incorporated in November 1802. It served as Camden County Georgia's seat of government from 1869 until 1923. Orange Hall is a contributing property and is also on the NRHP individually. The St. Marys United Methodist Church was founded in 1799. It is considered to be the father of Florida's Methodist Churches.

== Gallery of photos ==
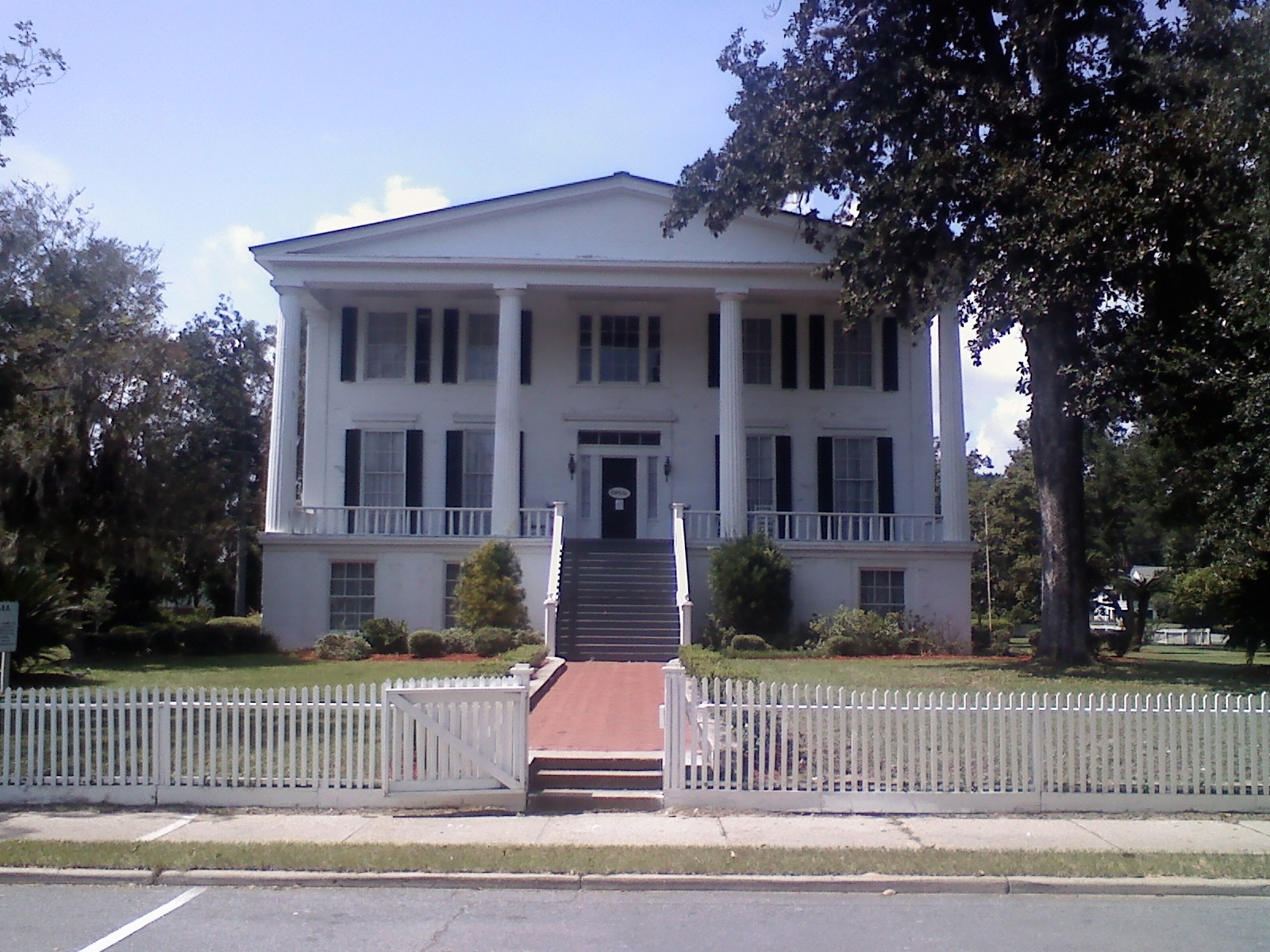
Orange Hall c.1838

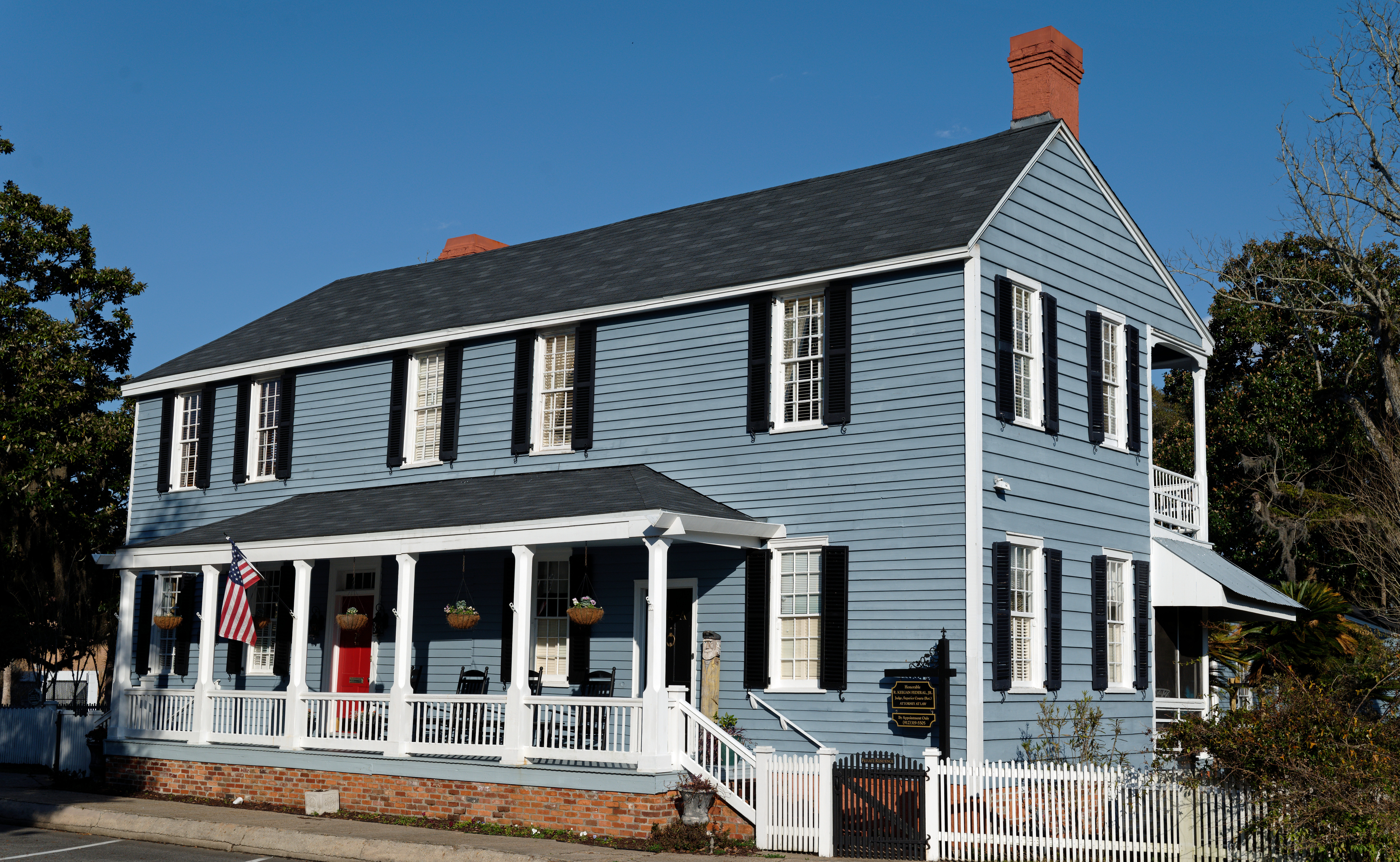
Jackson-Clark-Bessent-MacDonell-Nesbitt House c.1801 (Also on the National Trust for Historic Preservation)

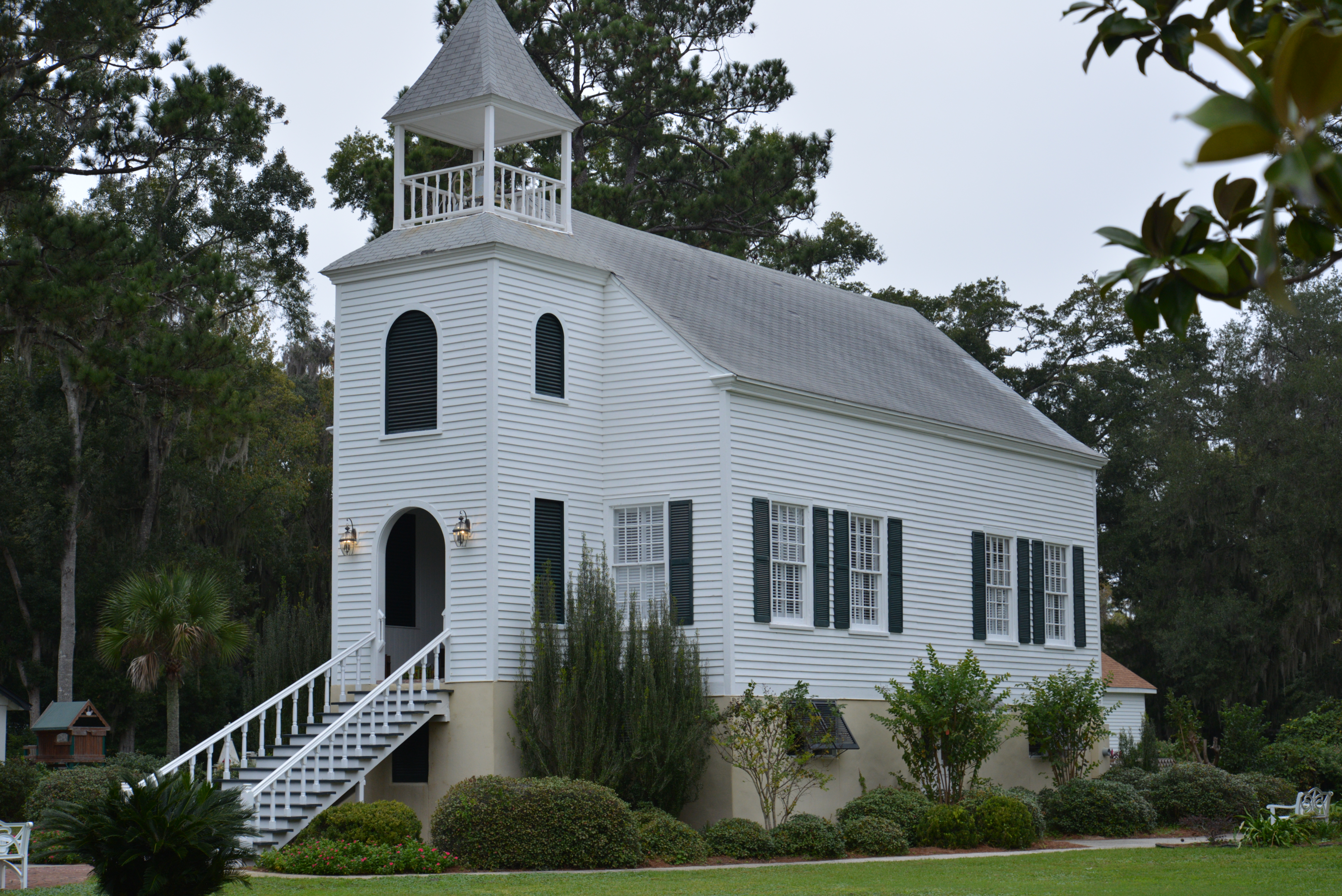
First Presbyterian Church c.1808

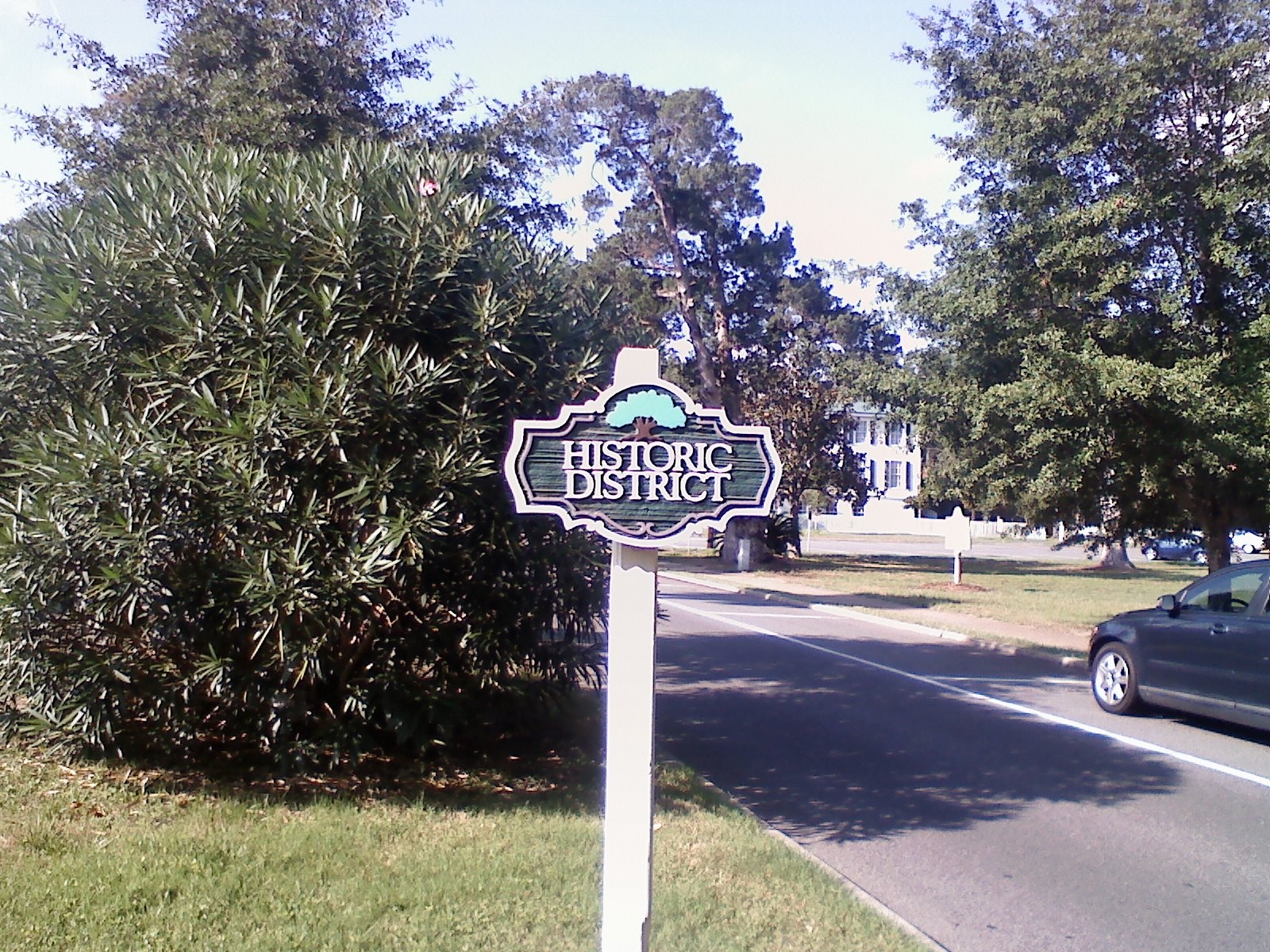
St. Marys Historic District sign

== See also ==
- St. Marys, Georgia
- Cumberland Island
- National Register of Historic Places listings in Camden County, Georgia
