= Julius C. Alford =

American politician (1799–1863)

Julius Caesar Alford (May 10, 1799 – January 1, 1863) was an American slave owner, politician, soldier and lawyer.

== Biography ==
Born in Greensboro, Georgia, in 1799, Alford studied law, gained admission to the state bar in 1809, and began practicing law in Lagrange, Georgia.

Alford served in the Georgia House of Representatives and was a company commander during the Creek War of 1836. He was elected as an Anti-Jacksonian Representative from Georgia to the 24th United States Congress to fill a vacancy caused by the resignation of George W. Towns. Alford served the remainder of that term from January 2, 1837, to March 3, 1837, and lost his reelection bid in 1836 to the 25th Congress. While serving in Congress in 1837, he called for a petition for the abolition of slavery in the District of Columbia by 22 slaves to be burnt, leading to the Gag Rule on slavery petitions. He also supported the forced removal of Creek Native American tribes from their land.

Alford successfully ran for a term in the 26th Congress as a Whig and was re-elected to a second term for the 27th Congress. He resigned in the midst of that latter term and served from March 4, 1839, to October 1, 1841.

After moving to Tuskegee, Alabama, Alford next moved near Montgomery, Alabama. He was a delegate to the Union convention at Montgomery in 1852 and returned to practicing law. He lost an 1855 campaign to represent Alabama in the 34th U.S. Congress. Alford was a member of the Alabama secession convention in 1861 which passed the Ordinance of Secession. He died on his plantation near Montgomery on January 1, 1863, and was buried there.

U.S. House of Representatives
Preceded by George W. Towns	Member of the U.S. House of Representatives from Georgia's at-large congressional district January 2, 1837 – March 3, 1837	Succeeded by George W. Towns
Preceded by Jesse Franklin Cleveland	Member of the U.S. House of Representatives from Georgia's at-large congressional district March 4, 1839 – October 1, 1841	Succeeded by Edward Junius Black
