= Augustus Holmes Kenan =

American politician (1805–1870)

Member of the C.S. House of Representatives from Georgia's 4th district
- In office February 18, 1862 – February 17, 1864
- Preceded by: New constituency
- Succeeded by: Clifford Anderson

Deputy from Georgia to the Provisional Congress of the Confederate States
- In office February 4, 1861 – February 17, 1862
- Preceded by: New constituency
- Succeeded by: Constituency abolished

Personal details
- Born: April 21, 1805 Baldwin County, Georgia, U.S.
- Died: July 2, 1870 (aged 65) Milledgeville, Georgia, U.S.
- Resting place: Memory Hill Cemetery, Milledgeville, Georgia, U.S.

Augustus Holmes Kenan (April 21, 1805 – June 2, 1870) was an American politician who served as the Confederate States Congress Representative from Georgia's 4th congressional district from 1862 to 1864. He was renowned for heroism in the Second Seminole War, leveraging his acclaim to win seats in both houses of the Georgia General Assembly. He was a delegate to the Georgia Secession Convention and was elected by that body, Deputy to the Provisional Congress of the Confederate States.

== Biography ==
Augustus H. Kenan was born April 21, 1805, in Baldwin County, Georgia. He was a lawyer by trade; residing in Milledgeville and Baldwin County his entire life. He was renowned as an able criminal lawyer of his era. Kenan married Henrietta G. Alston but was later divorced from her and remarried to Sarah Barnes of Baldwin County. They had five children of the marriage: Thomas Holmes, Lewis Holmes, Michael Johnston, Owen Tom, and Livingston. Kenan served in the Georgia House of Representatives and state Senate. He represented Georgia in the Provisional Congress of the Confederate States from 1861 to 1862 and the 1st Confederate States Congress from 1862 to 1864, losing reelection to Clifford Anderson. Kenan died on June 2, 1870, and interred at Memory Hill Cemetery in Milledgeville, Georgia.

== See also ==
- List of signers of the Georgia Ordinance of Secession

Political offices
New constituency	Deputy from Georgia to the Provisional Congress of the Confederate States; 1861–1862	Constituency abolished
Confederate States House of Representatives
New constituency	Member of the C.S. House of Representatives from Georgia's 4th district 1862–1864	Succeeded by Clifford Anderson
