= Washington Poe =

American mayor

Member-elect to the U.S. House of Representatives from Georgia's 3rd district
- In office Not seated
- Preceded by: Constituency reestablished
- Succeeded by: George W. Towns

Personal details
- Born: July 13, 1800 Augusta, Georgia, U.S.
- Died: October 7, 1876 (aged 76) Macon, Georgia, U.S.
- Party: Whig
- Education: Litchfield Law School

Washington Poe (July 13, 1800 – October 7, 1876) was an American Whig politician and lawyer from Georgia.

== Background ==
Born in Augusta, Georgia, Poe studied law at the Litchfield Law School in 1823, and was admitted to the Georgia bar in May 1825. Poe worked in Oliver Prince's law practice and became Solicitor General of the Macon Circuit Court. In January 1836, he was appointed the delegate from Central Georgia and his job was to determine the route of a railroad from Cincinnati, Ohio to the South. In the same year, Poe became the Vice President of the Macon Lyceum and Library Association.

In 1840, Washington Poe was a speaker and delegate for Bibb County at a convention to ratify the anti Van Buren Presidential slate. In 1841, he was elected mayor of Macon, Georgia. He had been solicitor-general for the Macon circuit. During the American Civil War, he was the postmaster of Macon, Georgia.

In 1844, Poe was elected to the United States House of Representatives, but resigned. He was a supporter of Henry Clay and served as the President of Macon's Henry Clay Club in 1844. Poe was a delegate to The Georgia Secession Convention of 1861 in Milledgeville, GA —voting in favor of secession and signing Georgia's Ordinance of Secession on January 19, 1861. During the Civil War, Poe served as Postmaster and participated in public life.

== Family ==
Washington Poe married Selina Shirley Norman on December 24, 1829.

== See also ==
- List of signers of the Georgia Ordinance of Secession
- Confederate States of America, causes of secession, "Died of states' rights"
- List of United States representatives-elect who never took their seats

== Notes ==
U.S. House of Representatives
Constituency reestablished	Member-elect to the U.S. House of Representatives from Georgia's 3rd congressional district 1844	Succeeded by George W. Towns
