= Orange Hall (St. Marys, Georgia) =

Historic house in Georgia, United States

- Orange Hall St. Marys, Georgia
- U.S. National Register of Historic Places
- U.S. Historic district – Contributing property
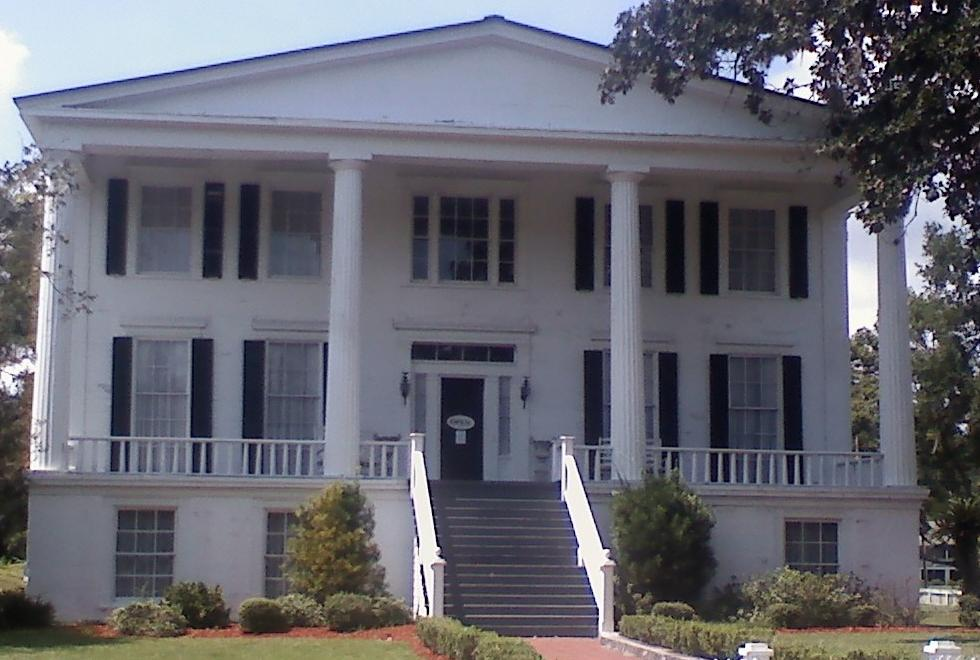
- Orange Hall

- Location within Georgia Location within the United States
- Location: 311 Osborne St., St. Marys, Georgia, United States, within the St. Marys Historic District
- Coordinates: 30.72431°N 81.54811°W
- Built: 1830
- Architectural style: Greek Revival
- Part of: St. Marys Historic District (Georgia) (ID76000609)
- NRHP reference No.: 73000613
- Added to NRHP: May 7, 1973

Orange Hall c. 1830, is located at 311 Osborne St., St. Marys, Georgia, United States, located within the St. Marys Historic District in Camden County and was listed on the National Register of Historic Places on May 7, 1973. In 2011, Orange Hall was added to the list of the state of Georgia's ten most endangered historic sites by the Georgia Trust for Historic Preservation.

== Historical significance ==
Orange Hall is a good example of the temple-form Greek Revival dwelling. A frame building with clapboard siding, it is among the first structures of Greek Revival design in America. The name originated from the orange trees that surrounded the house. Other details include: two stories, a gabled roof, interior chimneys, front center entrance with side lights and transom surmounted by low pedimented lintel, front tetrastyle prostyle Doric pedimented portico supported by projecting basement, and a rear center recessed two-story porch.

== Historic American Buildings Survey ==
The Library of Congress, Historic American Buildings Survey/Historic American Engineering Record has the following data recorded regarding Orange Hall. Owner in 1934: S.C. Townsend, Date of Erection: 1810–1815, Architect: No record, Builder: No record, Built for the Rev. Horace Southworth Pratt, a Presbyterian minister.

=== Architectural notes ===
This building of the Early Republican period is a Doric prostyle temple. The pediment is flattened and the columns are widely spaced. At the rear end is a superimposed inset portico, one porch above the other.

The brink basement storey is stuccoed and has stucco quoins of inch projection. In the basement used to be the old kitchen, now marked by its whitewashed walls, a herringbone brick floor pattern and a Dutch oven. The old Dining Room was under the front portico.

Orange Hall
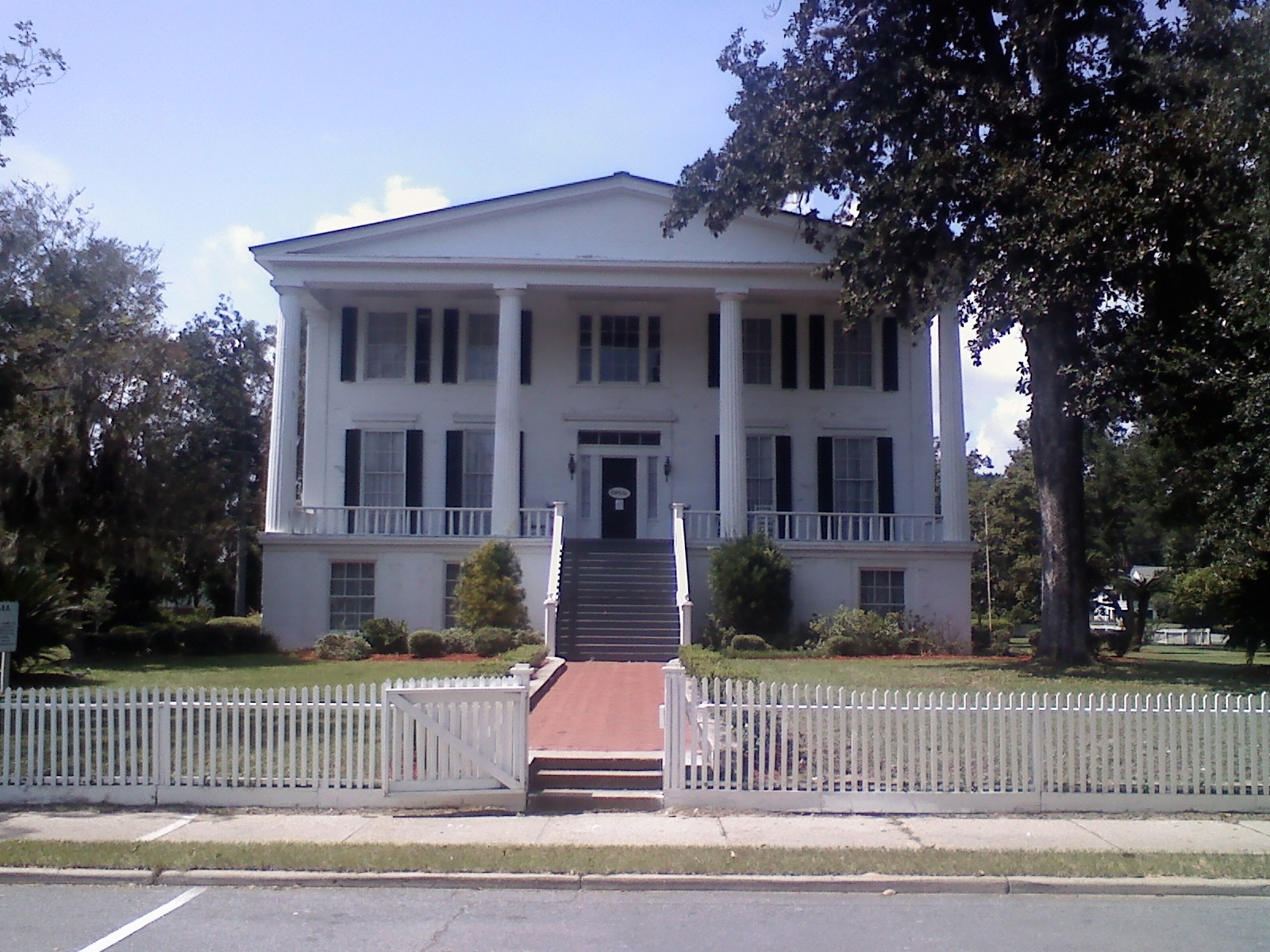
Orange Hall c.1838

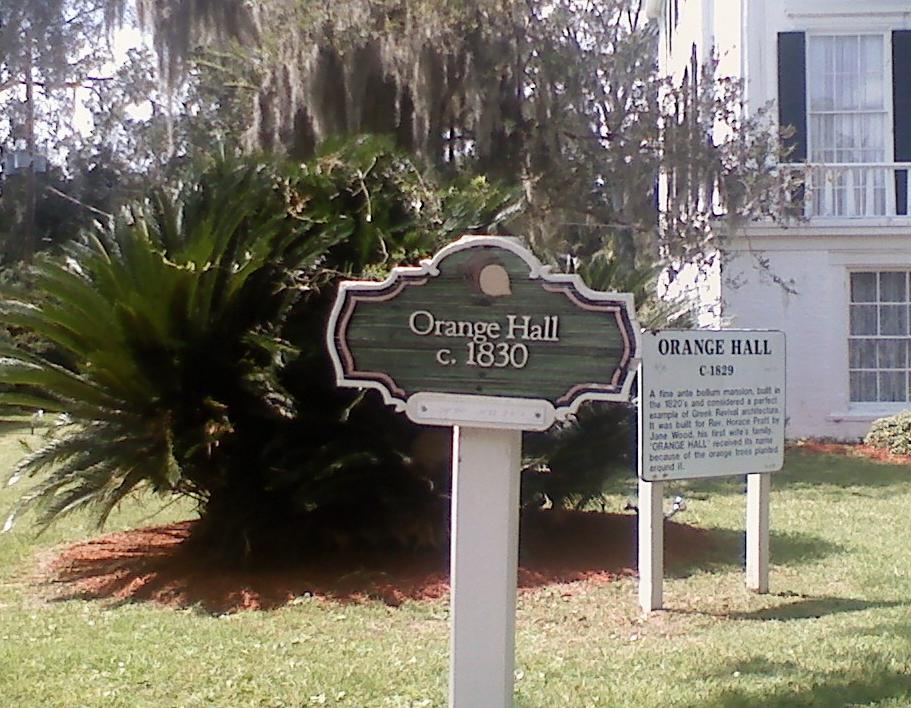
Historic district sign near Orange Hall

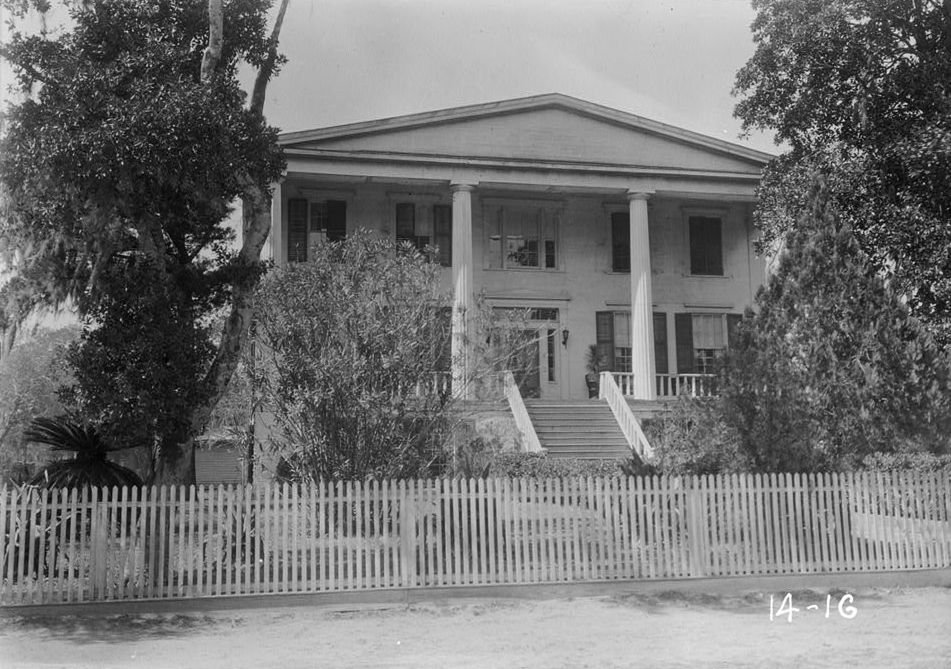
Front view from 1934

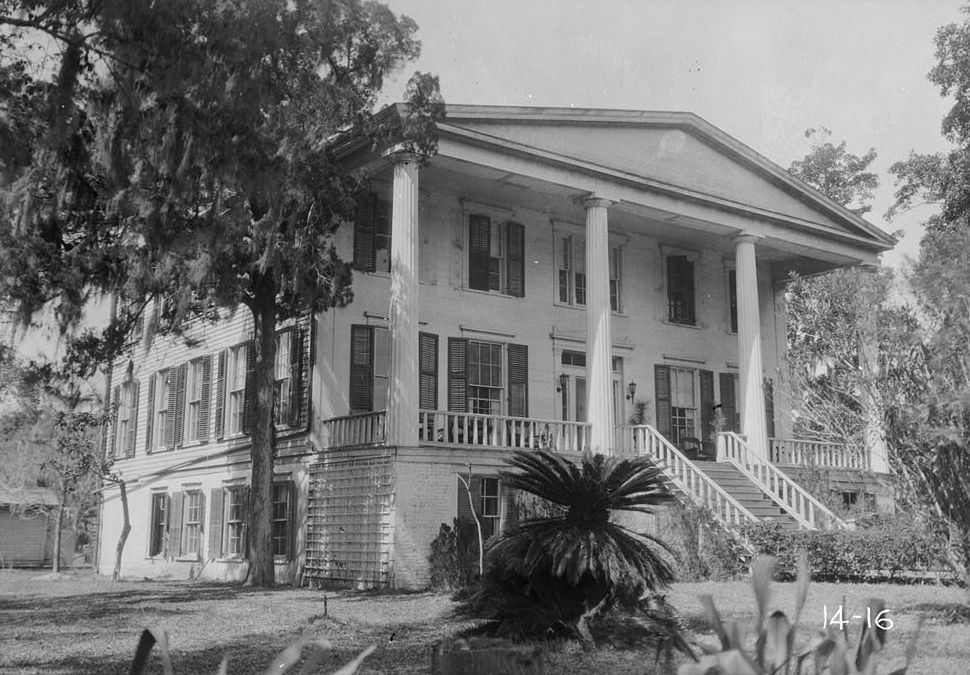
Side view from 1934

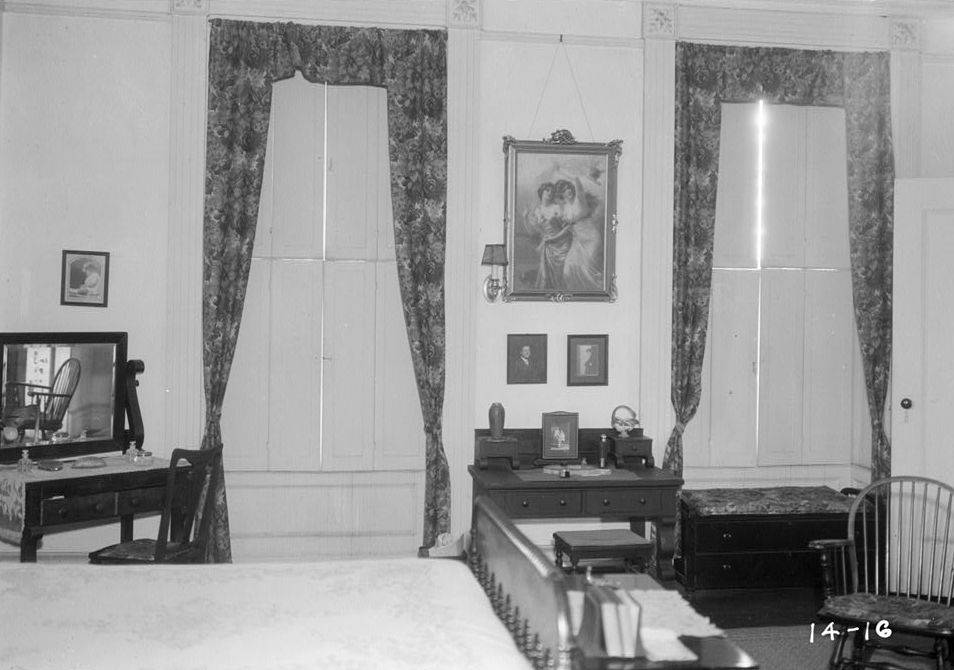
Bedroom

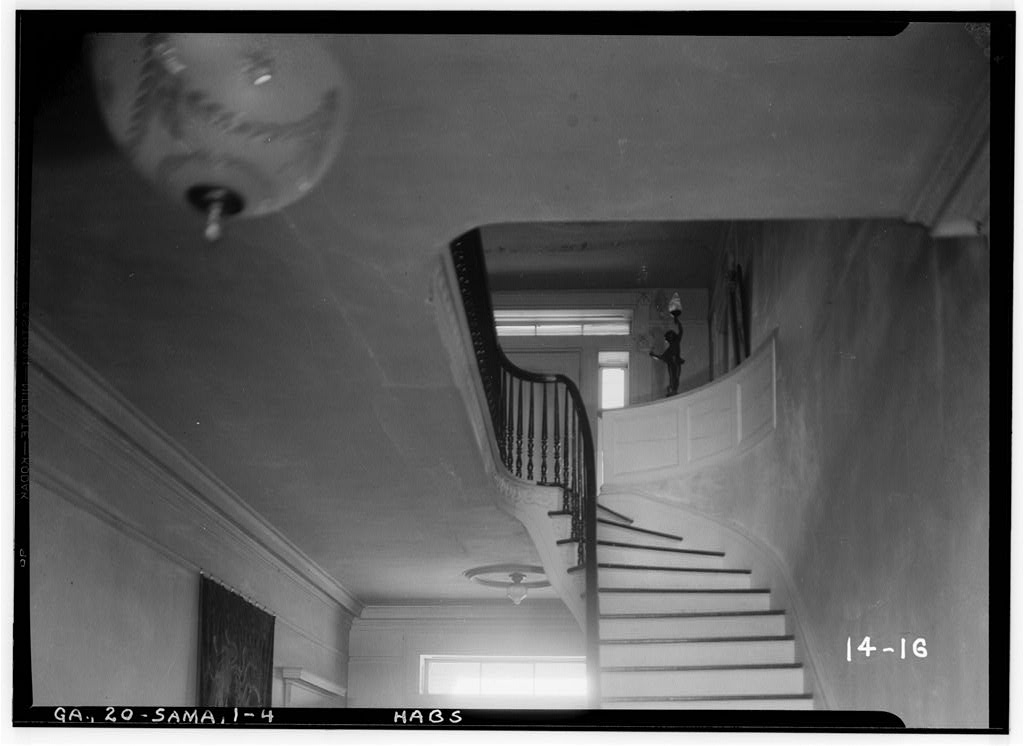
Interior stairwell

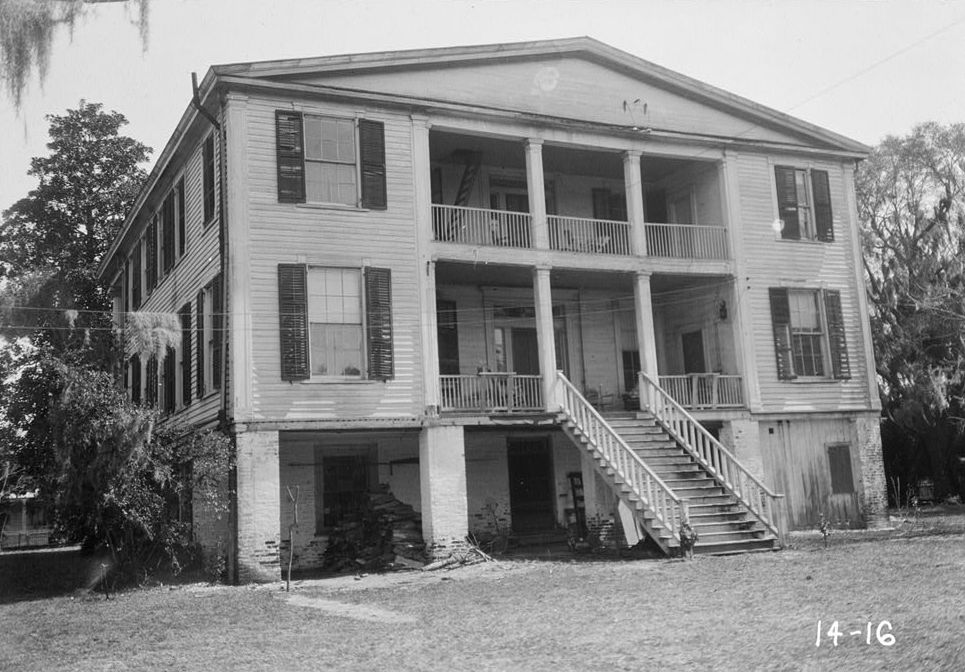
Rear view from 1934

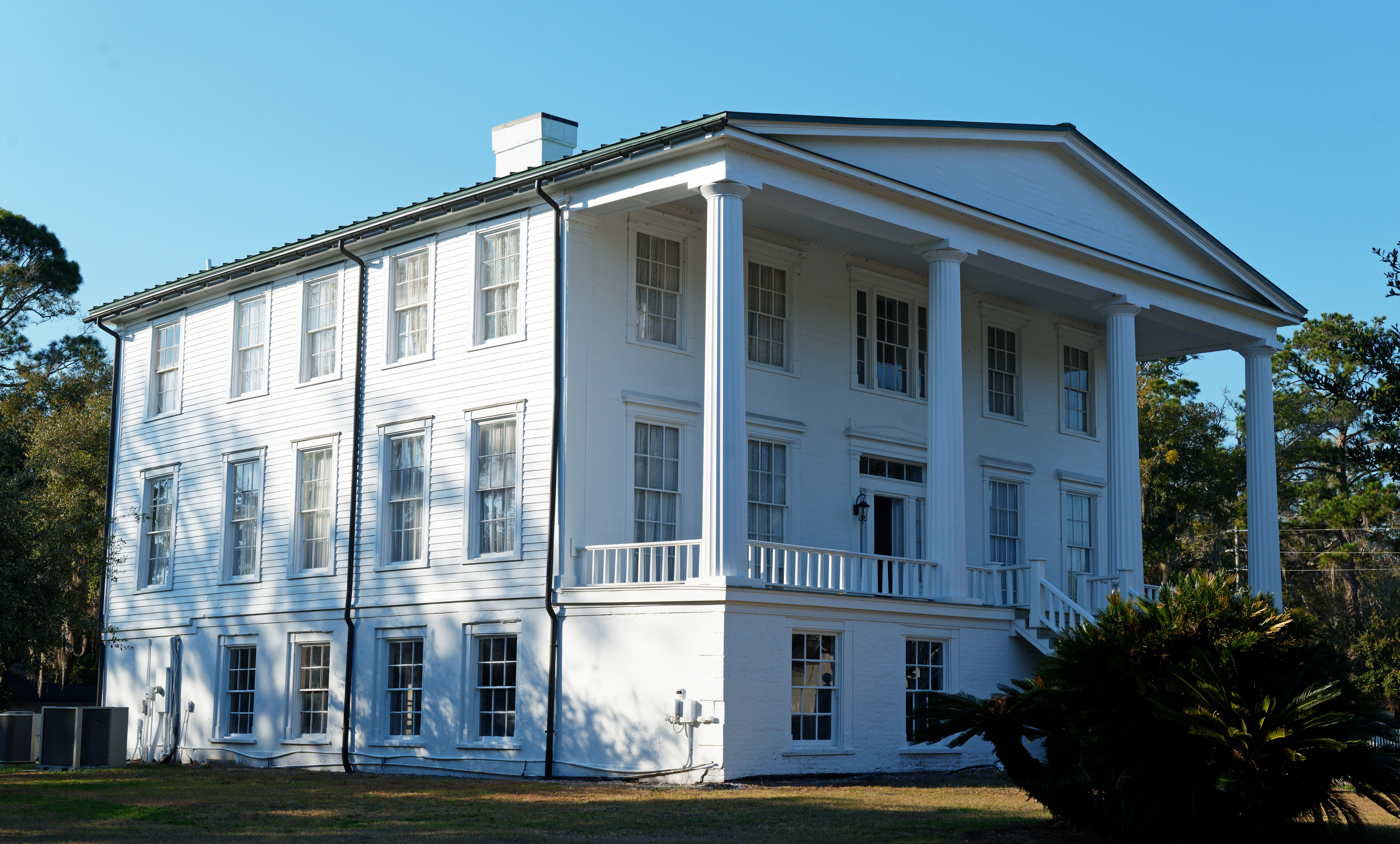
Angle view in 2022

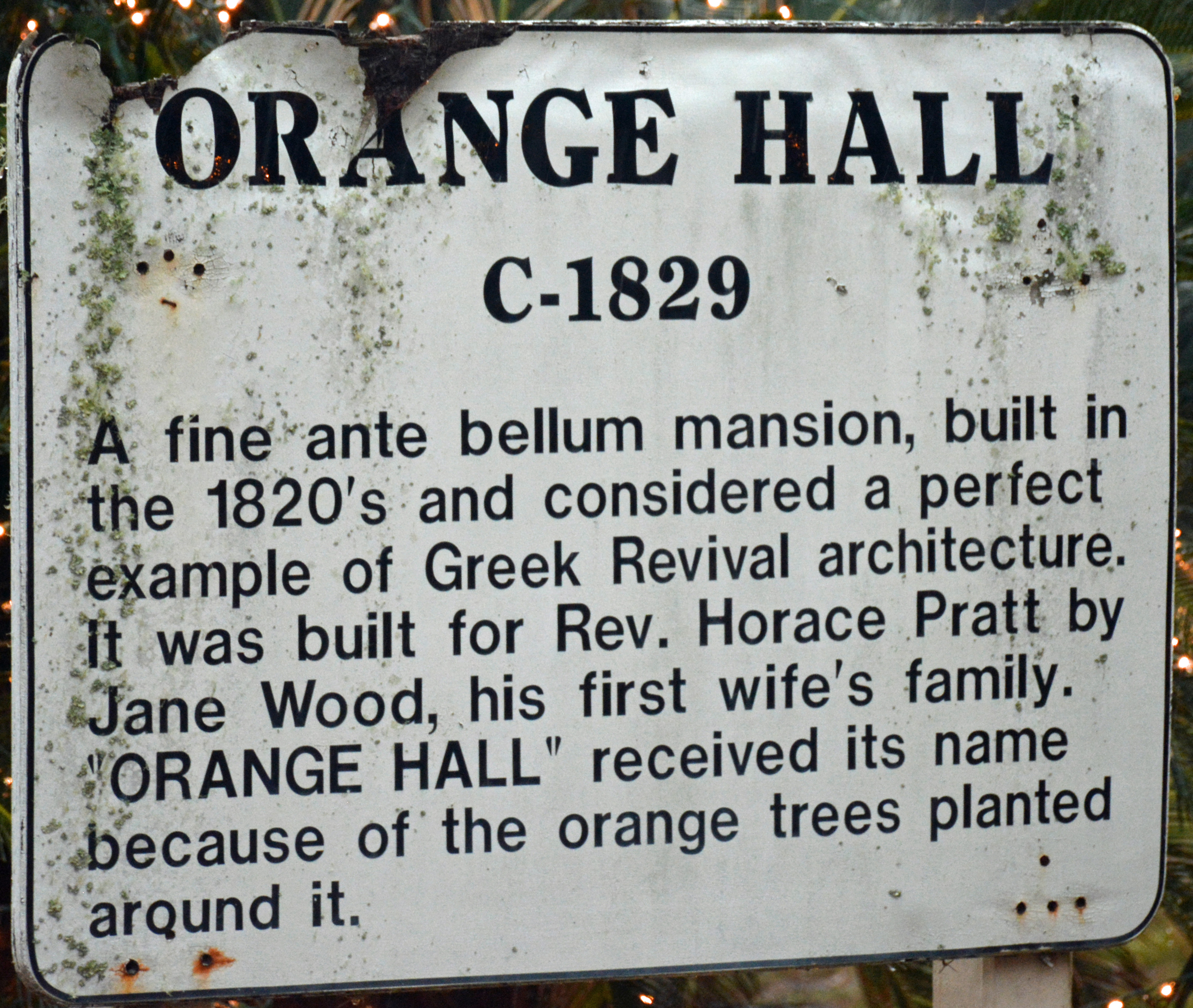
Sign at Orange Hall

== History ==
=== Construction and original ownership ===
The property on which Orange Hall stands today was originally granted to William Ashley, one of the twenty founders of St. Marys, in 1787. Phineas Miller is listed as the owner of the lot when it was sold to Ethan Clarke in 1803. In 1826, the lot was divided and the northern half was sold to the wealthy John Wood and Horace Southworth Pratt, a Presbyterian minister. Pratt had arrived in St. Marys around 1820, established the First Presbyterian Church of St. Marys in 1822, and married Wood's daughter, Jane, in 1823.

In 1829, before construction of Orange Hall began, Pratt's wife, Jane, died. Pratt remained in St. Marys and remarried a few years later. In 1838, construction of Orange hall completed, with master carpenter Isaac Slayton listed as the builder. In 1839, Pratt, a Yale and Princeton graduate, took a position as a professor at the University of Alabama and left Orange Hall behind. General Duncan Lamont Clinch is thought to have lived there when Pratt left for Alabama. Pratt died in 1840 before he could return to Orange Hall.

=== Succession of ownership ===
The property was sold in public auction in 1846 to James Mongin Smith, a wealthy planter from Beaufort, South Carolina. Subsequent owners include:

1856 – Francis Adams, Mayor of St. Marys

1866 – Elizabeth and Joseph Ryals

1869 – Silas Fordham, a town supervisor and farmer from New York who used the home as a winter retreat

1911 – Joel Lee Sweat, a judge, representative, and state senator from Ware County.

1919 – James Howard Becker, an automobile manufacturer

1925 – George and Ruth Fryhofer, who spent little time in St. Marys and briefly lost possession to Camden County due to failure to pay taxes

1933 – Effie G. Townsend, who fell upon hard times in World War II and converted the upper floors to apartments

1949 – Faye Kelly, daughter of Effie Townsend, who severed two parcels from the original lot

1951 – St Marys Kraft Corporation, which bought to house paper mill employees for 10 years

1961 – City of St. Marys, which agreed to rename the building the "Gilman Civic Center" and use it as a library

=== Preservation ===
Orange Hall fell into disrepair during the 1960s. In 1975, the City of St. Marys, the local Chamber of Commerce, and the Gilman Paper Company, assisted by numerous clubs and individuals, initiated an effort to preserve and restore the building. Work began in 1978 using skilled but unemployed high school students because the historic grant required the use of unemployed laborers, which the coordinators were unsuccessful at organizing. The project was highly successful and completed in 1980.

In 1982, Naval Reserve Commander John K. Mott completed an extensive restoration plan for the property. Due to limited available of funding, very few of his recommendations were implemented.

In 1983, a group of Navy Reservist Seabees took part in repair and reconstruction activities during their summer active duty session.

== See also ==
- St. Marys, Georgia
- St. Marys Historic District (St. Marys, Georgia)
- National Register of Historic Places listings in Camden County, Georgia
- Cumberland Island
