= 30th Georgia Infantry Regiment =

Infantry regiment of the Confederate States Army

- 1861 Georgia flag
- Active: September 25, 1861 - April 26, 1865
- Country: Confederate States of America
- Allegiance: Georgia
- Branch: Confederate States Army
- Engagements: Jackson Expedition, Battle of Chickamauga, Battle of Adairsville, Battle of Peachtree Creek, Battle of Jonesborough, Battle of Franklin, Third Battle of Murfreesboro, Battle of Nashville

Commanders
- Notable commanders: Colonel David Jackson Bailey

The 30th Georgia Infantry Regiment served in the Confederate States Army during the American Civil War.

== Organization ==
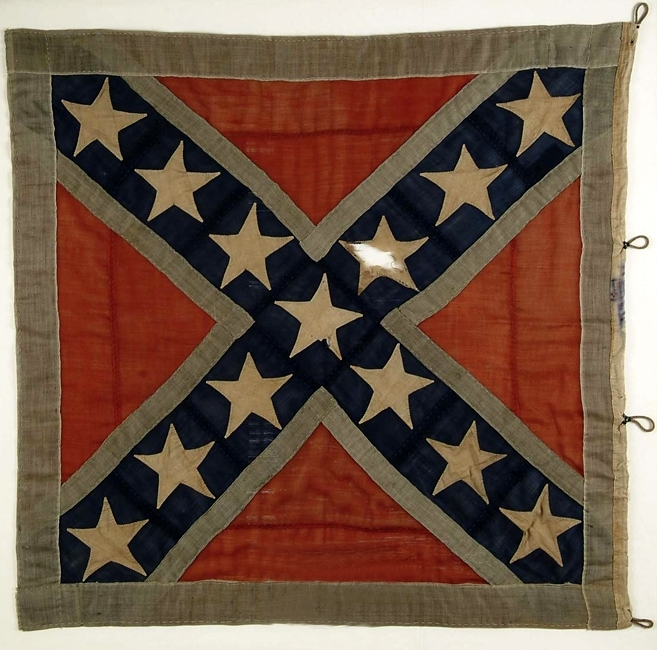
Co E, 30th Georgia Volunteer Infantry battle flag

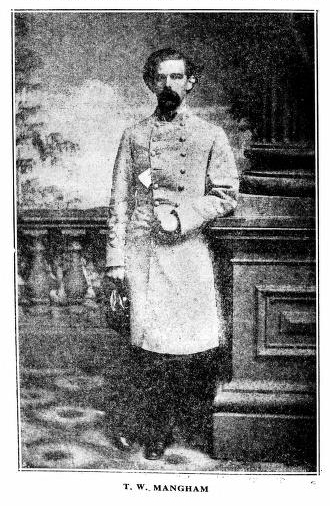
Col. Thomas Woodward Mangham

The regiment was organized at Camp Bailey, near Fairburn, Georgia, in October 1861. Ten companies of volunteers met at the request of David Jackson Bailey, who had obtained permission from Governor Joseph E. Brown to form an infantry regiment for Confederate service. Due to a confusion in numbering, the regiment was known as the 25th until it was rearranged in April 1862. After re-arrangement and throughout the war it was known as the 30th Georgia

The 30th Georgia comprised ten companies. The regiment was re-arranged in April 1862 in accordance with the conscript bill passed by the Confederate Congress, as follows:

- Company A (originally Company B): Butts County — "Bailey Volunteers", Capt. Henry Hendrick
- Company B (originally Company E): Bartow County — "Bartow Invincibles", Capt. R. M. Hitch
- Company C (originally Company F): Campbell County — "Campbell Sharpshooters", Capt. W. N. Magouirk
- Company D: Bibb County — "Hugeney Rifles", Capt. Hudson Whitaker
- Company E (originally Company I): Clayton County — "Clayton Invincibles", Capt. C. A. Dollar
- Company F (originally Company C): Butts County and Spalding County — "Hunter Guards", Capt. R. J. Andrews
- Company G (originally Company H): Fayette County — "Fayette Volunteers", Capt. R. M. Harrell
- Company H (originally Company G): Campbell County — "Campbell Greys", Capt. J. O. Redwine
- Company I (originally Company A): Butts County — "Butts' Invincibles", Capt. F. L. Walthall
- Company K: Campbell County — "Chattahoochee Volunteers", Capt. G. F. Longino

== Early Deployment ==
The regiment initially stationed itself at three camps in or near Savannah, Georgia: Camp Bartow, Camp Hardee, and Camp Young. In early October 1862 the 30th Regiment marched to Florida to reinforce General Finnegan, who had retreated from Jacksonville. After a few days' picket duty the troops were ordered back to Savannah. In late October deployed to Coosawhatchie, South Carolina, to reinforce Confederate forces defending the railroad between Savannah and Charleston. Union forces had already retreated, however, and the 30th returned to Savannah after a few days.

In December 1862 and January 1863 the regiment twice travelled to Wilmington, North Carolina, to defend against an anticipated Union advance; returning to Savannah on February 9. April 9–19 the regiment deployed to Charleston, South Carolina. April 27 - March 4 they deployed to Pocotaligo, South Carolina.

== Jackson Expedition ==
The 30th Georgia Regiment reached Jackson, Mississippi, on May 14 as part of General William H.T. Walker's Brigade, marching from there to Yazoo City and on to the Big Black River (Mississippi) to join the Jackson Expedition. Under the command of Colonel Thomas W. Mangham, the regiment was ordered on July 4 to march in the rear in a retreat towards Jackson, keep up stragglers, and aid the sick and disabled. On July 7 the regiment halted at a position west of Jackson and stacked arms. On May 16 the 30th Georgia Regiment, together with the 24th Texas Regiment were successful in re-establishing a picket line that had been charged by Union forces the previous day.

== Battle of Chickamauga ==
On August 24, 1863, the regiment left Morton to join General Braxton Bragg's army in Chattanooga, Tennessee. They joined Bragg's retreat from Chattanooga on September 7, arriving in Lafayette, Georgia, and spent the next few days with Bragg's army maneuvering for position. On September 19, they took part in the Battle of Chickamauga. Having crossed the Chickamauga Creek the night before, the 30th Georgia advanced with a brigade commanded by Colonel Wilson of the 25th Georgia, as part of the left flank. Colonel Mangham was wounded during the advance; the brigade fell back to its first position, which it held until reinforcements arrived. The 30th Georgia engaged again the next day in a different part of the field.

== Georgia Campaign ==
The brigade to which the 30th Georgia belonged suffered some losses through capture during the Battle of Missionary Ridge, but took little part in the fighting. Afterwards, they retired with Bragg's army to Dalton, Georgia, for winter quarters. On May 14, 1864, the regiment took some fire at the Oostanaula River, but did not take part in the Battle of Resaca. The 30th Georgia participated in fighting near Calhoun, Georgia, on May 16, just prior to the Battle of Adairsville, sustaining considerable losses.

The 30th Georgia took part in the Battle of Peachtree Creek and sustained considerable loss there. They also participated in the Battle of Jonesborough, where Company E found itself fighting in its home county, with several killed or wounded.

== Tennessee Campaign ==
The 30th Georgia was involved in a skirmish in Decatur, Alabama, with Hood's army in November 1864, where a lieutenant was killed and other casualties suffered. The regiment was on the extreme left flank of Jackson's Brigade during the Battle of Franklin, figuring prominently in the fighting and incurring heavy losses. The regiment participated in the Third Battle of Murfreesboro, again suffering losses. During the Battle of Nashville, on the afternoon of December 16, the 30th Georgia Regiment was surrounded when the Confederate left flank was breached by heavy cannon fire. Nearly all members of the regiment were killed, captured or wounded at this battle.

== See also ==
- Georgia in the Civil War
- List of Civil War regiments from Georgia
