= Nicholas Bayard Clinch =

American military officer (1832–1888)

Major Nicholas Bayard Clinch (1832 – March 16, 1888) was an American military officer. He was commander in the army of Confederate States of America during the American Civil War, as well as a planter and inventor.

== Early life ==
Clinch was born in Louisiana, in 1832, the seventh of eight children. His father was Brevet General Duncan Lamont Clinch, a veteran of the War of 1812, Indian fighter, planter and public servant. His mother was Eliza Bayard McIntosh of Camden County, Georgia, Clinch's second wife. His older brother was Duncan L. Clinch Jr., colonel of 4th Georgia Volunteer Cavalry, Provisional Army of the Confederate States. His sister, Eliza Bayard Clinch was the wife of General Robert Anderson, the Union commander who defended Fort Sumter in April 1861.

He graduated from South Carolina College, now University of South Carolina, in 1849, the same year his father died.

== Military career ==
Clinch mustered into the Confederate army as a private in December 1862 and within a year was promoted to 1st lieutenant and regimental adjutant for the 4th Regiment, Georgia Volunteer Cavalry, commanded by his older brother Duncan, and rose to captain and commander of Clinch's Artillery Company, or "Clinch's Light Battery," which was named for him, in the fall of 1863.

Among other battles, Captain Clinch's Light Battery fought to defend Fort McAllister near Savannah, Georgia, during the Second Battle of Fort McAllister where it was stationed to provide support and to occupy field works along the route from the railroad and river to the fort during the attack by Sherman's forces on December 13, 1864.

During the siege, he was wounded at least 11 times, slashed by a sword in the face, bayoneted in the neck and arms and shot through the shoulder, continuing to fight after the fall of the fort until his wounds were so severe he could no longer stand. He was taken to a nearby plantation. His wounds were considered mortal, but he was eventually taken to a hospital at Beaufort, SC, where he struggled between life and death for three months, undergoing multiple surgeries. Eventually his brother Houston Clinch took Bayard to the family plantation where he recuperated. Houston told the New York Sun newspaper that Bayard never fully recovered his physical vigor. An obituary published in the New York Sun newspaper said Clinch "was known throughout the south as the most wounded Confederate soldier who lived to tell of the strife." He was promoted to major during his recuperation.

== Post-war life and death ==
In 1883, Clinch applied to the United States Patent and Trademark Office for a patent on a new mounting system for a sulky, which featured a mechanism to isolate the movement of the horses from the passenger seat for a smoother ride. He also patented a push carriage for transporting toddlers and small children; the patent was issued two days before his death.

Nicholas Bayard Clinch died at Green Cove Springs, Florida, on March 16, 1888, aged 55 or 56, and was interred in the Clinch family vault at Bonaventure Cemetery, in Savannah, Georgia.
