= Allen F. Owen =

American politician

Allen Ferdinand Owen (October 9, 1816 – April 7, 1865) was an American politician and lawyer who served in the United States Congress.

Owen was born near the Yadkin River in Wilkes County, North Carolina. He graduated from Franklin College at the University of Georgia in Athens, where he was a member of the Phi Kappa Literary Society. He then graduated from Yale College in 1837, where he was a member of Skull and Bones, and from the Dane Law School at Harvard University in 1839. He was admitted to the bar in Boston, Massachusetts in 1839 and began the practice of law in Talbotton, Georgia in 1840.

In 1843, Owen was elected to the Georgia House of Representatives and served in that position until 1847. The next year, he served as the clerk of the state House of Representatives and was delegate to the Whig National Convention.

Owen was elected as to U.S. House of Representatives as a Whig in 1848, serving one term, from March 4, 1849 through March 3, 1851; however, he later became associated with the Democratic party. After his congressional career, Owen was a consul in Havana, Cuba from May through December 1851 and then resumed the practice of law in Talbotton. He died in Upatoi in Muscogee County, Georgia in 1865 while visiting relatives, and he was buried in Oak Hill Cemetery in Talbotton.

U.S. House of Representatives
Preceded by John William Jones	Member of the U.S. House of Representatives from Georgia's 3rd congressional district March 4, 1849 – March 3, 1851	Succeeded by David J. Bailey
