= 1847 Georgia gubernatorial election =

- October 4, 1847
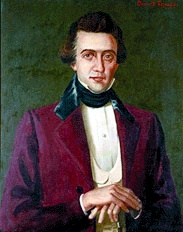

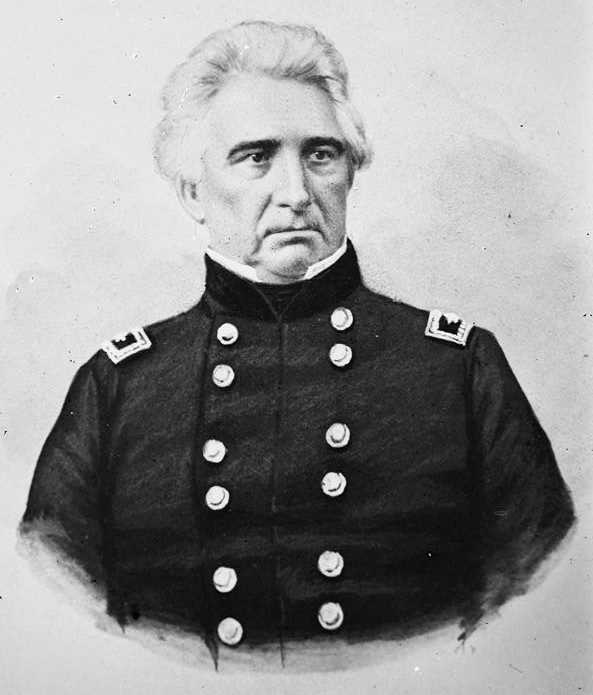
Nominee	George W. Towns	Duncan L. Clinch
Party	Democratic	Whig
Popular vote	43,219	41,941
Percentage	50.75%	49.25%
- Results by County; Towns: 50–60% 60–70% 70–80% 80–90% >90% Clinch: 50–60% 60–70% 70–80% 80–90% >90%
Governor before election
George W. Crawford
Whig
Elected Governor
George W. Towns
Democratic

The 1847 Georgia gubernatorial election was held on October 4, 1847, to elect the governor of Georgia. Democratic candidate George W. Towns won election over Whig challenger Duncan L. Clinch.

== General election ==
=== Candidates ===
==== Democratic ====
- George W. Towns, former house representative.

==== Whig ====
- Duncan Lamont Clinch, former house representative.

=== Results ===
1847 Georgia gubernatorial election
Party	Candidate	Votes	%	±%
Democratic	George W. Towns	43,219	50.75	+1.83
Whig	Duncan L. Clinch	41,941	49.25	−1.83
