= Duncan Lamont Clinch =

American politician (1787–1849)

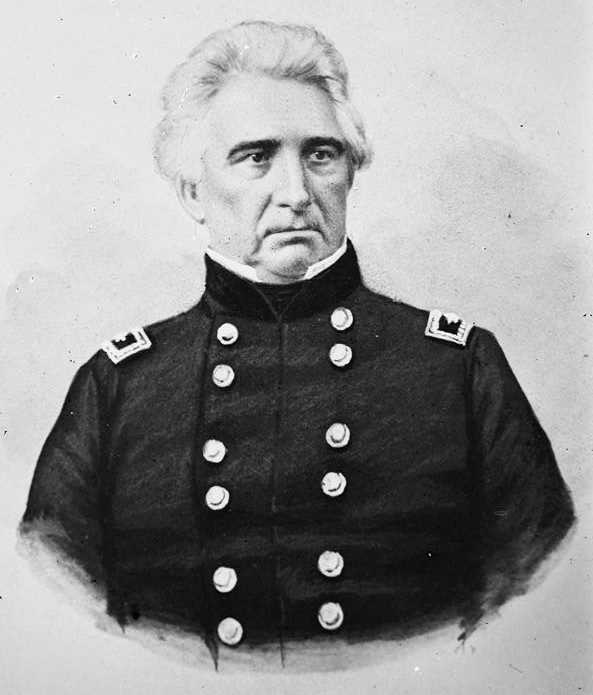
- General Duncan Lamont Clinch

Member of the U.S. House of Representatives from Georgia's at-large district
- In office February 15, 1844 – March 3, 1845
- Preceded by: John Millen
- Succeeded by: District inactive

Personal details
- Born: April 6, 1787 Ard-Lamont plantation, Edgecombe County, North Carolina, U.S.
- Died: December 4, 1849 (aged 62) Macon, Georgia, U.S.
- Resting place: Bonaventure Cemetery, Savannah, Georgia
- Party: Whig
- Relations: John Houston McIntosh (Father-in-Law)

Military service
- Allegiance: United States
- Branch/service: United States Army
- Years of service: 1808–1836
- Rank: Colonel; Brevet Brigadier general
- Unit: 3rd Infantry Regiment
- Commands: 8th Infantry Regiment; 4th Infantry Regiment
- Battles/wars: First Seminole War; Second Seminole War

Duncan Lamont Clinch (April 6, 1787 – December 4, 1849) was an American army officer and slave-plantation owner who served as a commander during the War of 1812, and First and Second Seminole Wars. In 1816, he led an attack on Negro Fort, the first battle of the Seminole Wars. Clinch later served in the United States House of Representatives, representing Georgia.

== Early life ==
Clinch was born at "Ard-Lamont", a plantation in Edgecombe County, North Carolina on April 6, 1787. He was the son of Joseph John Clinch, Jr. (1754–1795), an American Revolution veteran of both the Continental Army and the North Carolina Militia (Edgecombe County Regiment) who attained the rank of colonel. Joseph Clinch also served in political office, including justice of the peace and member of the North Carolina House of Commons.

Duncan Clinch was educated in the local schools and by private tutors. In the summer of 1808, he joined the United States Army as a first lieutenant. His first assignment was as a regimental paymaster for the 3rd U.S. Infantry Regiment in New Orleans.

== Military career ==
Clinch was initially assigned to the 3rd Infantry Regiment. He was promoted to captain in 1810, lieutenant colonel in 1813, colonel in 1819, and brigadier general in 1829.

He served primarily on frontier posts in what were then the southwestern United States. In 1816, he commanded forces in southern Georgia, and was ordered by General Andrew Jackson to attack Seminole positions at Negro Fort, an abandoned British post along the Apalachicola River which had become a safe haven for escaped slaves. He was ordered to recover runaway slaves in hiding at the fort.

Supported by gunboats, Clinch's attack on the outpost caused a major incident when an explosion, resulting from naval artillery hitting the fort's powder magazine, resulted in the deaths of hundreds of Seminoles and slaves, contributing to the beginning of the First Seminole War.

=== Second Seminole War ===
In summer and fall 1835, General Clinch, who was in charge of removing the Seminole from Florida, became increasingly convinced that removal would require a large and active military force. A soldier who carried mail between Fort Brooke and Fort King was killed and mutilated by Seminoles and Charley Amathla, a Seminole leader who was in favor of emigration and who had sold his property in preparation for removal, was killed by Osceola. In response, Clinch ordered Major Francis L. Dade to leave Key West and bring his company of men to Fort Brooke.

Clinch saw service during the Second Seminole War including the Battle of the Withlacoochee before resigning from the Army in 1836.

I had been taught when living at St. Augustine to regard General Clinch as a strict unfeeling disciplinarian but I learned how good men are often maligned. To me he was the reverse, for his bearing was most fatherly, always available to others and beaming with kindness. Picture the image of an old gray-haired man of 5 ft. 10 inches, of muscular build, weighing over 250 pounds, sitting upon the dirt floor, giving counsel and comfort to a poor dying private soldier. That was the true General Duncan L. Clinch, called by his contemporary officers The Spartan General. His ways were plain and simple, living in a tent like all the other soldiers, excepting he had a bed and mattress to sleep upon. His food was plain and many times I saw him dining with his staff on pork and beans, occasionally getting a beef day like the rest of us. Now and then he would have an extra dish of Indian Corn. He only drank water and many times I fetched a pitcher for him from the large round pond or spring outside the Camp. When we lived at the Driver's house, I lived with him, my medicine chest being close to his door. I was the first he saw on rising in the morning and the last at night and when we were in the field, my Hospital tent was immediately in front of the General's. So plain were his habits that he was no burden to the Army for even when on the move his only requisition was a campstool. Other Generals such as Scott required a band of music, with a company of professional cooks and servants in attendance.

– Steward John Bemrose Second Seminole War 1865.

He lived on a plantation near St. Mary's, Georgia. In an 1844 special election he was elected to Congress as a Whig, filling the vacancy caused by the death of John Millen. He served in the 28th Congress, February 15, 1844 to March 3, 1845, and did not run for reelection to a full term in 1844.

Clinch died in Macon, Georgia on December 4, 1849, aged 62, after a long struggle with erysipelas. He was buried at Bonaventure Cemetery in Savannah, Georgia.

== Honors ==
Clinch County, Georgia was named for Clinch. In the Civil War, the 5th Georgia Volunteer Infantry's first company was also named after him, as the regiment originated from Clinch County.

Fort Clinch (and Fort Clinch State Park) on Amelia Island, Florida is named for Clinch. The Fort is at 2601 Atlantic Avenue, Fernandina Beach, Florida 32034.

There was another Fort Clinch further south, this one in present-day Frostproof, Florida.

== Family ==
Duncan Lamont Clinch married three times, first to Eliza Bayard McIntosh, then to Elizabeth Houstoun, and finally to Sophia Hume Clinch, to whom he was married at the time of his death.

His son, Colonel Duncan Lamont Clinch Jr., commanded the 4th Georgia Cavalry CSA during the American Civil War. This unit fought at the Battle of Olustee in Florida, and also in the Atlanta campaign later in 1864.

He was also the father-in-law of Robert Anderson (Union officer), commander of Fort Sumter.

His own father-in-law, the father of his first wife Eliza Bayard McIntosh, was John Houston McIntosh, who led the Patriot Group in a failed uprising against the Spanish in the Patriot War in Florida.

Another son, Captain Nicholas Bayard Clinch, was commander of "Clinch's Light Battery", or as "Clinch's Artillery Company", a division of older brother Duncan's 4th Georgia Volunteer Cavalry CSA and an inventor.

== Archival material ==
In the Library of Florida History, Special and Area Studies Collections, George A. Smathers Libraries, at the University of Florida in Gainesville, Florida, there is a collection of General Duncan Lamont Clinch Family Papers, some of which have been digitized. It consists of correspondence of and newspaper clippings related to General Clinch.

== Notes ==
Party political offices
Preceded by George W. Crawford	Whig nominee for Governor of Georgia; 1847	Succeeded by Edward Y. Hill
U.S. House of Representatives
Preceded by John Millen	Member of the U.S. House of Representatives from Georgia's at-large congressional district February 15, 1844 – March 3, 1845	Succeeded by District inactive
