= John Millen (American politician) =

US Representative (1804–1843)

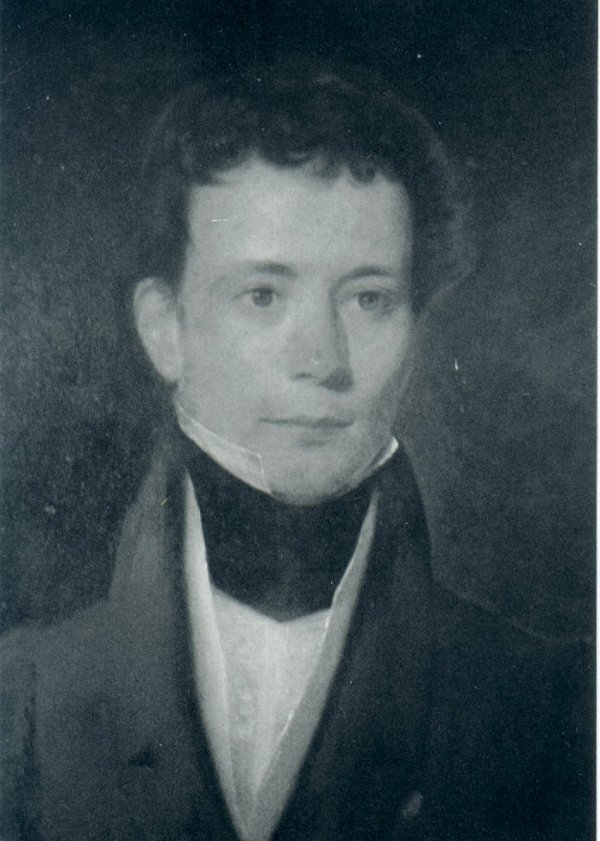

Member of the U.S. House of Representatives from Georgia's at-large district
- In office March 4, 1843 – October 15, 1843
- Preceded by: Roger Lawson Gamble
- Succeeded by: Duncan Lamont Clinch

Personal details
- Born: 1804 Savannah, Georgia, U.S.
- Died: October 15, 1843 (aged 38–39) Savannah, Georgia, U.S.
- Resting place: Laurel Grove Cemetery
- Party: Democratic

John Millen (1804 – October 15, 1843) (Note: Savannah records lists October 16 as date of death.) was a United States representative and lawyer from Georgia.

== Early years and education ==
Millen was born in Savannah in 1804, of German and Irish descent. He was orphaned at a young age. He studied law, gained admittance to the state bar and practiced law in Savannah. It was said that his practice was quite lucrative, and that his wealth was built upon his legal career.

== Political career ==
Millen served in the Georgia House of Representatives in 1828, 1834, 1835, 1839, and 1840. During his tenure in the Georgia General Assembly, Millen was appointed a Colonel in the State Militia.

In 1843, he was elected as a Democratic Representative, at large, from Georgia to the 28th United States Congress. Millen had pledged to bring more federal assistance to the city of Savannah, and its commercial harbor. He was unable to follow through with that pledge, however, having died only several months after assuming office.

== Death and legacy ==
John Millen's service in Congress was brief. He served from March 4, 1843, until his death, at age 39, on October 15, 1843, in Savannah. His illness was brief, just two days in length. He was unmarried and without children at the time of his death, meaning his sole heir was his sister. Millen was buried in that city's Laurel Grove Cemetery. There is a cenotaph for him at Congressional Cemetery in Washington, D.C.

The town of Millen (the county seat of Jenkins County, Georgia) is named after him.

== See also ==
- List of members of the United States Congress who died in office (1790–1899)

== Notes ==
U.S. House of Representatives
Preceded by Roger Lawson Gamble	Member of the U.S. House of Representatives from Georgia's at-large congressional district March 4, 1843 – October 15, 1843	Succeeded by Duncan Lamont Clinch
