= Alfred Cumming =

Alfred Cumming is the name of:

- Alfred Cumming (governor) (1802–1873), Governor of the U.S. Territory of Utah from 1858 to 1861, uncle of the Confederate general
- Alfred Cumming (general) (1829–1910), Confederate general in American Civil War, nephew of the governor
