= Joseph Clay (disambiguation) =

Joseph Clay (1769–1811) was a U.S. representative from Pennsylvania.

Joseph Clay may also refer to:

- Joseph Clay Jr. (1764–1811), U.S. federal judge
- Joseph Clay (Georgia soldier) (1741–1804), soldier and public official
