= George W. Crawford =

American politician (1798–1872)

George Crawford
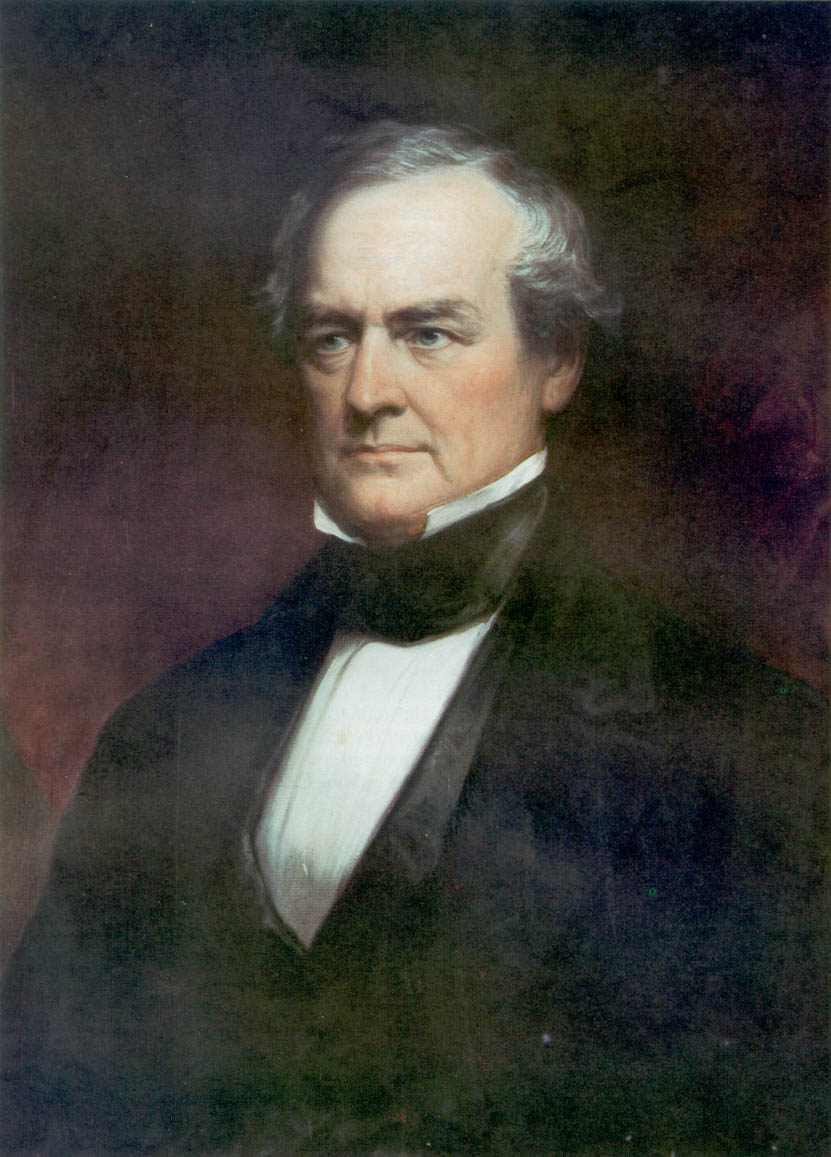

21st United States Secretary of War
- In office March 8, 1849 – July 23, 1850
- President: Zachary Taylor; Millard Fillmore
- Preceded by: William L. Marcy
- Succeeded by: Charles Conrad

38th Governor of Georgia
- In office November 8, 1843 – November 3, 1847
- Preceded by: Charles McDonald
- Succeeded by: George W. Towns

Member of the U.S. House of Representatives from Georgia's at-large district
- In office January 7, 1843 – March 3, 1843
- Preceded by: Richard W. Habersham
- Succeeded by: Hugh A. Haralson

Member of the Georgia House of Representatives
- In office 1837–1842

Attorney General of Georgia
- In office 1827–1831
- Governor: John Forsyth; George Gilmer
- Preceded by: Thomas F. Wells
- Succeeded by: Charles J. Jenkins

Personal details
- Born: George Walker Crawford; December 22, 1798 Columbia County, Georgia, U.S.
- Died: July 27, 1872 (aged 73) Augusta, Georgia, U.S.
- Resting place: Summerville Cemetery
- Party: Whig
- Spouse: Mary McIntosh
- Children: 4
- Education: Princeton University (BA); University of Georgia (MA)

Military service
- Branch/service: Georgia Militia
- Years of service: 1824-1825
- Rank: Second Lieutenant
- Unit: 10th Regiment

George Walker Crawford (December 22, 1798 – July 27, 1872) was a licensed attorney turned politician from Columbia County, Georgia. Crawford was appointed attorney general for the state in 1827, by Governor John Forsyth, serving in that capacity until 1831. Crawford also served five years in the General Assembly's lower house as a representative of Richmond County on a platform of states' rights.

George Crawford served in the U.S. House of Representatives, filling the seat vacated by Richard W. Habersham who died while in office. Crawford was elected Georgia's 38th governor – serving two terms from 1843 to 1847. He became the only Whig Party candidate in state history to occupy the Governor's Mansion. Crawford then served as United States Secretary of War from 1849 to 1850.

Crawford's time in President Zachary Taylor's cabinet was marred by speculation regarding a probate claim he settled for George Galphin's heirs. Crawford received a gratuity of substantial remuneration for his services' – Crawford's political adversaries framed it as the Galphin Affair – marking the end of Crawford's political aspirations. When President Taylor unexpectedly died while in office, Crawford resigned his position as Secretary of War and entered political retirement.

In 1861, however, Crawford was elected a delegate from Richmond County to the state's Secession Convention which brought him out of retirement to answer the call of his constituents. By the convention's first order of business, Crawford was elected Permanent President of the Convention by which he presided over Georgia's decision to secede from the Union and join the Confederate States of America.

== Early life ==
George Walker Crawford was born on December 22, 1798, in Columbia County, Georgia. He was the fourth son of Peter and Mary Ann Crawford. His father was a veteran of the American Revolutionary War from Virginia who had settled in Georgia to claim a land share, known as a bounty grant, which the state of Georgia had set aside for "those who had fought for independence".

Peter Crawford acquired a sizable tract of land that he called Belair Plantation. The homestead was situated close to his uncle, Joel Crawford. Peter's uncle Joel fathered William H. Crawford, soon becoming a politician renowned locally for his political service to the state and for two presidential bids – running in 1816, and then again in 1824.

George Crawford grew up on the family's estate, heavily influenced by his father, and his cousin William as well. George's father was a practicing attorney and George availed himself to the well-stocked personal library of his father while homeschooling his education. Peter Crawford also entered Georgia politics himself – beginning as Columbia County's first clerk of courts and becoming a 10-term representative in the state legislature. George Crawford's cousin, William H. Crawford, was also becoming well known for his political service, and was the subject of local legend for two famous duels he had been a principal of.

George Crawford built on his homeschooling at the College of New Jersey's school of law (later becoming Princeton University). Crawford graduated with a bachelor's degree in 1820, and subsequently completed an internship under the tutelage of Richard Henry Wilde. Crawford was licensed to practice law in 1822, and started a legal practice in Augusta partnering with Henry H. Cumming. He went on to obtain a master's degree from the Franklin College of Arts and Sciences, the founding college of the University of Georgia. After graduating Franklin, Crawford served from 1824 to 1825, as a second lieutenant in the 10th Regiment of the Georgia Militia.

In 1826, George Crawford married Mary Ann MacIntosh, having four children of the marriage: William Peter, Sarah MacIntosh, Anna Elizabeth, and Charles. George W. Crawford embarked on his political career the following year, accepting a gubernatorial appointment to become Georgia's attorney general.

== Attorney General of Georgia ==
Governor John Forsyth appointed Crawford to succeed Thomas F. Wells as Georgia's attorney general in 1827. The following year, Crawford challenged Georgia state legislator Thomas E. Burnside, Ambrose Burnside's uncle, to a duel over published defamation Burnside had written about Crawford's father.

=== The code duello ===
When George Crawford read the anonymous letter to the editor published in The Augusta Chronicle he was incensed by the prose – sharply criticizing the political views of his father, then declining in health. Crawford regarded it as an attack on his father's good name. Crawford demanded the newspaper editor give him the author's name but the editor refused, protecting Burnside's identity by telling Crawford the letter was from a woman, and that for this reason, he would not release the person's name.

Inexplicably, Burnside contacted Crawford telling him that he was the author. Crawford immediately challenged Burnside to a duel which Burnside accepted, although with reluctance. The code duello was waning in vogue but it was still held as a measure which an honorable man was obliged to endure. Burnside was aspiring his own political career which showed promise of upward mobility. Burnside felt he would be shamed with dishonor if he refused, and in his era, without honor there was no career in politics.

Dueling had already been outlawed in Georgia so the two belligerents, with their seconds, traveled together by train to Fort Mitchell, Alabama where the practice was still legal – to finish what by then had become a "well-publicized fight". Burnside seemed to have sensed the duel would not end in his favor, dispatching a letter to his wife on the eve of the fateful encounter:

Fort Mitchell, Jan. 24, 1828
Dear Wife and Mother:
Tomorrow I fight. I do it on principle. Whatever may be my fate, I believe I am right. On this ground I have acted and will act. I believe I shall succeed, but if I do not I am prepared for consequences. Kiss the children and tell them that if I fall my last thought was of them. Yours most affectionatelyThomas E. Burnside

Crawford shot Burnside dead in the infamous duel, prompting the state to pass new legislation; "forbidding persons involved in duels from holding office". The restriction only applied to duels fought after the law was enacted and did not affect Crawford's career. He continued serving as attorney general until 1831, when he was succeeded by Charles J. Jenkins.

Thomas E. Burnside was interred in the private burial ground of Colonel John Crowell, renowned for his participation in the War of 1812. The Colonel lived near the site where the duel had taken place and personally ensured every protocol of respect was accorded at Burnside's burial. Two weeks passed before Mrs. Burnside received word of her husband's demise. It was said that she nearly died herself from distraught upon receiving the news.

She moved with her children to Dahlonega, Georgia, residing there until her death. Crawford carried regret for his role in what was called "a deplorable and unfortunate affair". He was known to have made anonymous financial contributions to Burnside's widow and children though he was remembered as saying it made no amends – and for having expressed lament shortly before his own death in 1872.

== Congressman ==
In 1837, Crawford was elected to the Georgia General Assembly as a member of the House of Representatives for Richmond County. There, Crawford distinguished himself as a fiscal conservative. He was elevated to the United States House of Representatives as a Whig to fill the vacancy caused by the death of Richard W. Habersham. His term there was short, only serving from January 7 to March 3, 1843.

== Governor of Georgia ==
George W. Crawford was the Whig Party's nominee for governor in 1843. Crawford defeated the Democratic nominee, Mark Anthony Cooper, by a vote of 38,813 to 35,325 succeeding Charles J. McDonald to become the first Whig candidate to serve as Georgia's governor (as of 2019, he remains the only Whig governor). The Whigs won a majority in both houses of the state legislature in 1843, as well. Crawford was reelected in 1845, defeating Democratic challenger Matthew H. McAllister by a margin of 1,751 votes.

With the legislature's support, Crawford was able to effect the Whig's agenda which focused on debt reduction and fiscal restraint. Crawford's administration was able to reduce expenditures more than $66,000 in its first year and nearly eliminate the state's debt of $500,000 before being succeeded by George W. Towns. Besides implementing sound budget policy, Crawford was able to expand educational opportunities in the state and hasten construction of the state-owned Western and Atlantic Railroad.

Crawford's administration established the Supreme Court of Georgia as well, which had failed to be institutionalized for decades of previous effort. He redrew the state's congressional maps, and reformed the state penitentiary – making it "a more economically sound institution". Crawford also succeeded at dismantling the Georgia Central Bank, an important Whig campaign endeavor for years.

== Secretary of War ==
When General Zachary Taylor became President of the United States in 1849, he appointed Crawford United States Secretary of War. As War Secretary, he was involved in settling a claim from the United States government for the Galphin family, descendants of George Galphin, an American businessman who specialized in Indian Trade. Crawford received a large payment for his services and several of his political foes seized upon the opportunity to suggest impropriety.

Crawford was subsequently investigated by a commission and completely exonerated of any wrongdoing yet his critics continued casting aspersions. When Millard Fillmore became president after Taylor's sudden death while in office in 1850, Crawford resigned along with the rest of the Taylor administration, rather than work for Millard Fillmore.

== Georgia Secession Convention ==
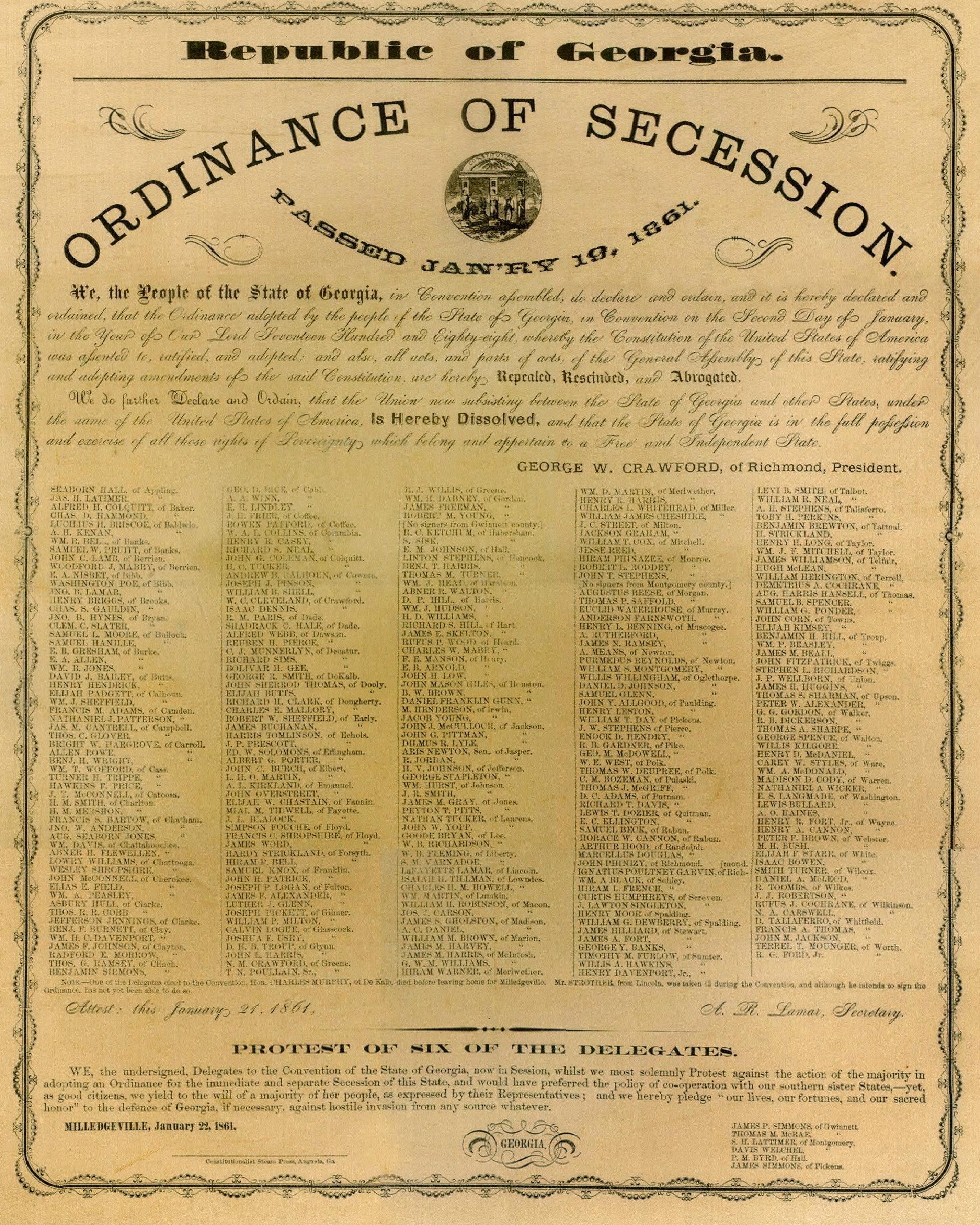
Facsimile of the 1861 Ordinance of Secession signed by delegates to the Georgia Secession Convention at the statehouse in Milledgeville, Georgia January 21, 1861

In 1861, Crawford was elected as a delegate from Richmond County, Georgia to the state's Secession Convention. The delegation elected Crawford president of the convention by a unanimous vote and he oversaw the state's vote of secession. As the convention's president, Crawford is considered the author of Georgia's Ordinance of Secession, the official document announcing the state's formal intent to secede the federal Union – originally as an independent republic, ultimately to join the Confederate States of America.

The delegation approved the ordinance January 19, 1861, with 208 voting in favor of secession and 89 opposed. The delegates signed the document in celebratory fashion two days later in the public square in front of the statehouse in Milledgeville where the convention was assembled. Crawford survived to witness the consequences of enacting the ordinance, lamenting its cost in the shed blood of Georgia citizens rallied by the convention's call.

Crawford was to be tried for inciting a rebellion due to his role in presiding over the state's secession and was excluded from eligibility for both Lincoln's and Johnson's amnesty proclamations because of his leadership status. Crawford escaped the harsh consequences of an adjudication of guilt in 1865, when Johnson approved his direct application for amnesty thereby restoring Crawford as a citizen of the United States in good stead – with full protection of his person and property against all forms of reprisal.

== Death and legacy ==
Crawford died on July 27, 1872, at his Belair estate, located near Augusta, Georgia. His funeral was held in St. Paul's Episcopal Church and he was buried in Summerville Cemetery located in Augusta.

On November 16, 1943, the keel was laid for the SS George Walker Crawford, a liberty ship built by the J.A. Jones Construction Company in Brunswick, Georgia honoring Crawford for his service to the state of Georgia. The ship was launched January 1, 1944, and delivered into federal service January 13, 1944.

Crawford's biographer Len Cleveland said that in researching his material he observed that "Crawford's entire political career was motivated by a traditional sense of duty rather than by deep political convictions". Robert Toombs spoke well of Crawford, Saying, "There are but few abler and no purer men in America, and he has administrative qualities of an unusually high order."

== See also ==
- List of signers of the Georgia Ordinance of Secession
- Confederate States of America, causes of secession
- "Died of states' rights"

Legal offices
Preceded by Thomas F. Wells	Attorney General of Georgia; 1827–1831	Succeeded by Charles J. Jenkins
U.S. House of Representatives
Preceded by Richard W. Habersham	Member of the U.S. House of Representatives from Georgia's at-large congressional district 1843	Succeeded by Hugh A. Haralson
Party political offices
Preceded by William Dawson	Whig nominee for Governor of Georgia; 1843, 1845	Succeeded by Duncan Clinch
Political offices
Preceded by Charles McDonald	Governor of Georgia; 1843–1847	Succeeded by George W. Towns
Preceded by William L. Marcy	United States Secretary of War; 1849–1850	Succeeded by Charles Conrad
