= George Oscar Dawson =

American politician

George Oscar Dawson (c. 1825 – June 1865) was a Georgia lawyer and politician who represented Greene County in the state legislature. He was the third child of Senator William Crosby Dawson.

He entered the Civil War as a Captain with the Greene County "Stephens Light Guards", Company I, 8th Regiment of the Georgia Volunteer Infantry of the Army of Northern Virginia on May 16, 1861. He was wounded at Second Manassas on August 28, 1862, elected Major on December 16, 1862, and then was wounded again at Gettysburg on July 3, 1863. He was assigned as Commandant of Post at Columbus, Georgia on June 10, 1864. He applied to the Secretary of War for assignment to the Military Court of General Hampton, C.S.A., March 28, 1865.

== See also ==
- Edgar Gilmer Dawson, his younger brother
