= Governor McDonald =

Governor McDonald or MacDonald may refer to:

- Charles James McDonald (1793–1860), Governor of Georgia
- Jesse Fuller McDonald (1858–1942), Governor of Colorado
- Malcolm MacDonald (1901–1981), Governor of Kenya in 1963 and Governor-General of Kenya from 1963 to 1964
- William C. McDonald (governor) (1858–1918), Governor of New Mexico

== See also ==
- Bob McDonnell (born 1954), Governor of Virginia
- Richard Graves MacDonnell (1814–1881), Governor of The Gambia from 1847 to 1851, of South Australia from 1855 to 1862, of Nova Scotia from 1864 to 1865, and of Hong Kong from 1866 to 1872
