= Judge Clay =

Judge Clay may refer to:

- Eric L. Clay (born 1948), judge of the United States Court of Appeals for the Sixth Circuit
- Joseph Clay Jr. (1764–1811), judge of the United States District Court for the District of Georgia
