= 1843 Georgia gubernatorial election =

- October 2, 1843
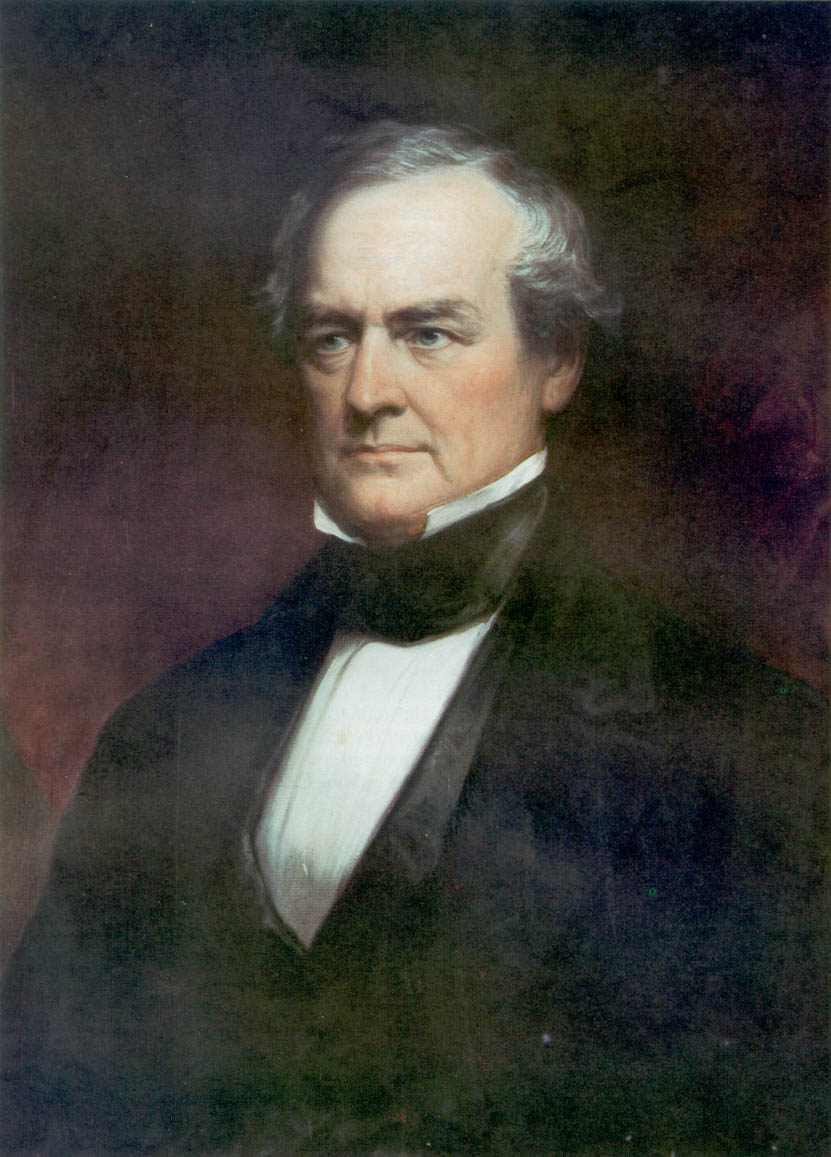

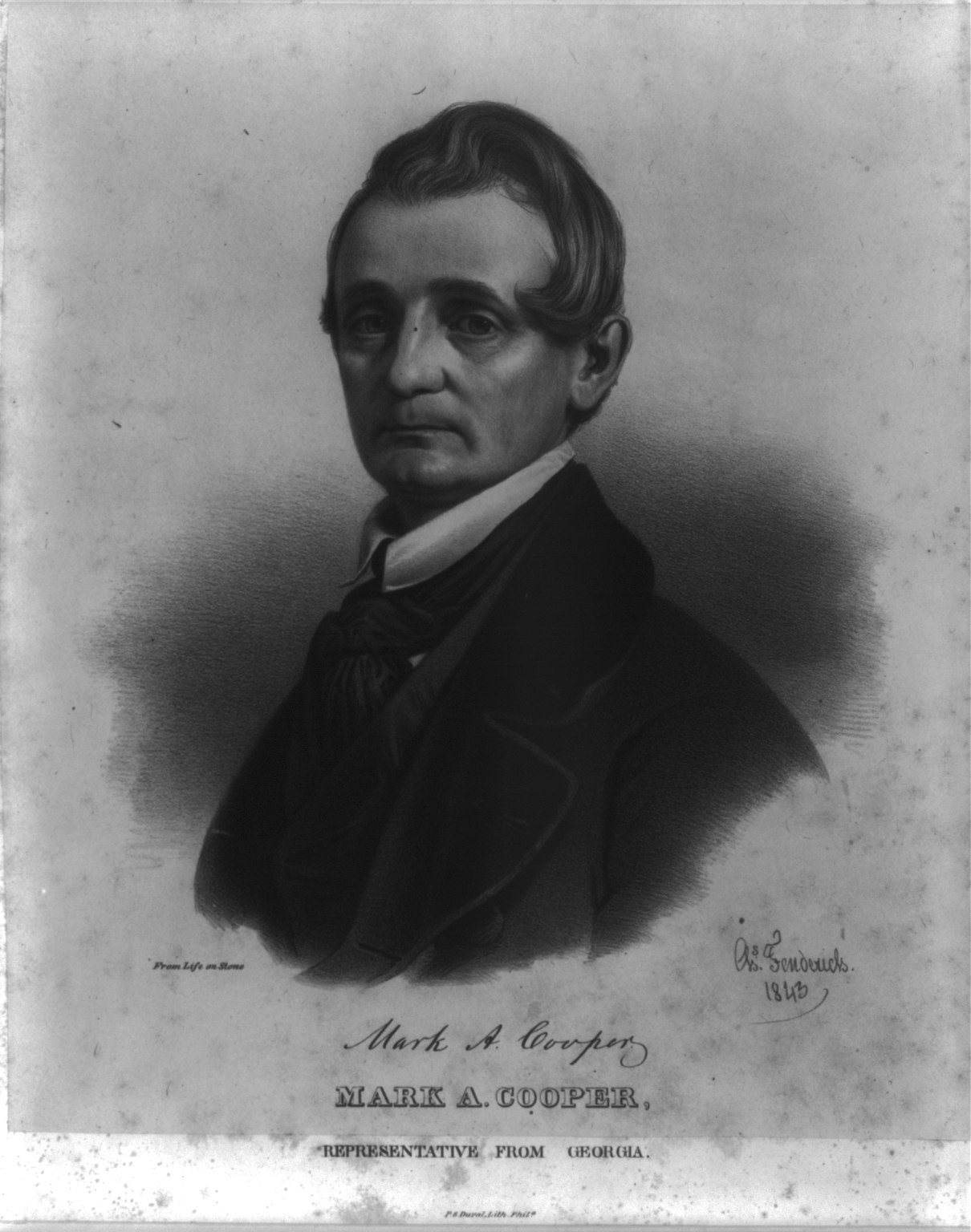
Nominee	George W. Crawford	Mark Anthony Cooper
Party	Whig	Democratic
Popular vote	38,713	35,325
Percentage	52.29%	47.71%
- Results by County; Crawford: 50–60% 60–70% 70–80% 80–90% >90% Cooper: 50–60% 60–70% 70–80% 80–90% >90%
Governor before election
Charles James McDonald
Democratic
Elected Governor
George W. Crawford
Whig

The 1843 Georgia gubernatorial election was held on October 2, 1843, to elect the governor of Georgia. Whig candidate George W. Crawford defeated the Democratic challenger Mark A. Cooper and was elected Governor.

== Background ==
Until 1840 Georgian politics were dominated by two local parties, the Union party and the State Rights party. By the 1842 Congressional election, these independent state parties had effectively amalgamated with the Democratic and Whig parties respectively.

== General election ==
=== Candidates ===
==== Whig ====
- George W. Crawford, former house representative.

==== Democratic ====
- Mark Anthony Cooper, former house representative.

=== Results ===
1843 Georgia gubernatorial election
Party	Candidate	Votes	%	±%
Whig	George W. Crawford	38,713	52.2%	+5.1
Democratic	Mark Anthony Cooper	35,325	47.7%	−5.1
