= Nathaniel Pendleton =

American judge (1756–1821)

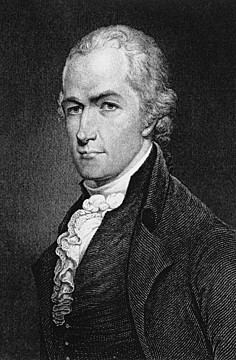

Judge of the United States District Court for the District of Georgia
- In office September 26, 1789 – September 1, 1796
- Appointed by: George Washington
- Preceded by: Seat established by 1 Stat. 73
- Succeeded by: Joseph Clay Jr.

Attorney General of Georgia
- In office 1785–1786
- Preceded by: Samuel Stirk
- Succeeded by: Matthew McAllister

Personal details
- Born: Nathaniel Pendleton; October 27, 1756 New Kent County, Colony of Virginia, British America
- Died: October 20, 1821 (aged 64) Hyde Park, New York
- Resting place: St. James' Churchyard; Hyde Park, New York
- Children: Nathanael G. Pendleton
- Relatives: Edmund Pendleton; John Penn
- Education: read law

Nathaniel Pendleton (October 27, 1756 – October 20, 1821) was a United States district judge of the United States District Court for the District of Georgia. He was also Alexander Hamilton's second in the Burr–Hamilton duel.

== Education and career ==
Born on October 27, 1756, in New Kent County, Colony of Virginia, British America, Pendleton read law. He served in the Continental Army starting in 1775, during the American Revolutionary War, serving as an aide-de-camp to General Nathanael Greene in the campaigns in the southern states. He was in private practice in Savannah, Georgia until 1789. He was Attorney General of Georgia from 1785 to 1786. He was elected as a delegate to the Constitutional Convention of 1787 which drafted the United States Constitution, but did not attend. He was elected to the Congress of the Confederation (Continental Congress) in 1789, but did not attend.

== Federal judicial service ==
Pendleton was nominated by President George Washington on September 24, 1789, to the United States District Court for the District of Georgia, to a new seat authorized by 1 Stat. 73. He was confirmed by the United States Senate on September 26, 1789, and received his commission the same day. His service terminated on September 1, 1796, due to his resignation.

== Later career ==
Following his resignation from the federal bench, Pendleton resumed private practice in Dutchess County, New York starting in 1796. He was a Judge of the Dutchess County Court until 1821.

== Death ==
Pendleton died on October 20, 1821, in Hyde Park, New York. He was interred in St. James' Churchyard in Hyde Park.

== Family ==
Pendleton was a nephew of Edmund Pendleton, the 1st Chief Justice of the Supreme Court of Virginia, and cousin of John Penn, a signatory of the United States Declaration of Independence and Articles of Confederation from North Carolina. He was the father of Nathanael G. Pendleton, a United States representative from Ohio.

== Sources ==
- United States Congress. "Nathaniel Pendleton (id: P000207)". Biographical Directory of the United States Congress.
- Nathaniel Pendleton at the Biographical Directory of Federal Judges, a publication of the Federal Judicial Center.
- Guide to the Nathaniel Pendleton Papers, 1767-1867

Legal offices
Preceded by Seat established by 1 Stat. 73	Judge of the United States District Court for the District of Georgia; 1789–1796	Succeeded by Joseph Clay Jr.
