= 1841 Georgia gubernatorial election =

- October 4, 1841
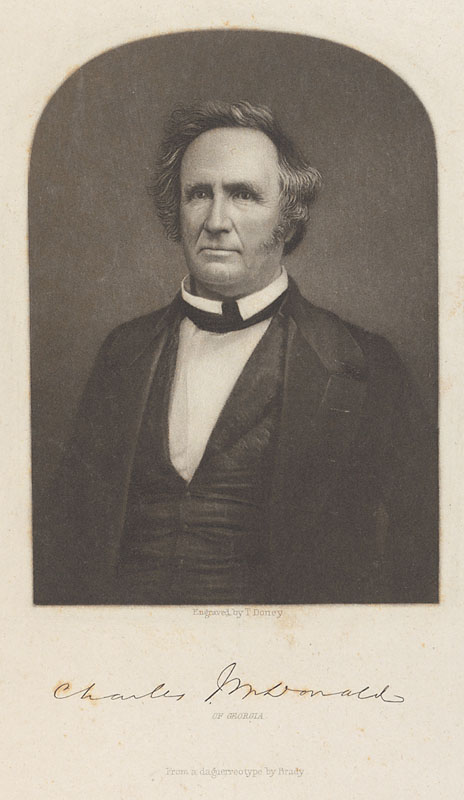

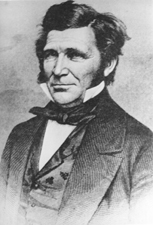
Nominee	Charles McDonald	William C. Dawson
Party	Democratic	Whig
Alliance		State Rights
Popular vote	38,716 (Note: Including returns from Muscogee County that were not included in the official count.)	34,541
Percentage	52.85%	47.15%
- Results by County (Note: Including returns from Muscogee County that were not included in the official count. The returns for Dade County were indicated as "202 majority."); McDonald: 50–60% 60–70% 70–80% 80–90% >90% Dawson: 50–60% 60–70% 70–80% 80–90% >90% No Data
Governor before election
Charles McDonald
Union/Democratic
Elected Governor
Charles McDonald
Democratic

The 1841 Georgia gubernatorial election was held on October 4, 1841, to elect the governor of Georgia. Incumbent Democratic Governor Charles McDonald won re-election defeating Whig State Rights candidate William C. Dawson.

== Background ==
Until 1840 Georgian politics were dominated by two local parties, the Union party and the State Rights party. The Union party was the product of the forces of liberal democracy that brought white manhood suffrage and popular elections in the 1800s. The State Rights party, on the other hand, was a political anomaly whose conservative politics and organization were more closely related to those of the late 1800s.

After the 1836 presidential election the Union and State Rights parties slowly began to merge with the Democratic and Whig parties respectively. During the 1840 presidential election the Union party accepted Van Buren as their presidential nominee and changed their name to the Democratic Party of Georgia. The State Rights party leaders, however, were more apprehensive to amalgamation with the national Whig party.

== General election ==
=== Candidates ===
==== Democratic ====
- Charles McDonald, Incumbent Governor.

==== Whig ====
- William C. Dawson, Former House Representative.

=== Results ===
1841 Georgia gubernatorial election (Official count) (Note: The returns from Muscogee County were not included in the official count by the legislature.)
Party	Candidate	Votes	%	±%
Democratic	Charles McDonald	37,838	52.89	+1.49
Whig	William C. Dawson	33,705	47.11	−1.49

1841 Georgia gubernatorial election (With Muscogee)
Party	Candidate	Votes	%	±%
Democratic	Charles McDonald	38,716	52.85	+1.45
Whig	William C. Dawson	34,541	47.15	−1.45
