= George Galphin =

American businessman

- Born: George Galphin; 1709; County Antrim, Ireland
- Died: December 1780 (aged 70–71); Silver Bluff, South Carolina, United States
- Occupations: Indian trader Indian commissioner
- Years active: 1737-1781
- Employer(s): Brown, Rae, & Co.
- Military career
- Rank: Commissioner of Indian Affairs
- Wars: American Revolution

George Galphin (1708–1780) was an American businessman specializing in Native American trade, a Native American Commissioner, and plantation owner who lived and conducted business in the colonies of Georgia and South Carolina, primarily around the area known today as Augusta, Georgia.

== Early life ==
Galphin was born in County Antrim, Ireland, in the early 18th century to Barbara and Thomas Galphin, a linen weaver by trade. Galphin was a Presbyterian of Scottish descent. Galphin came to America in 1737, arriving at the port of Charleston, South Carolina. In the 1740s, Galphin found work from Brown, Rae and Company, a trading firm based out of Augusta, Georgia.

== Indian trader ==
George Galphin became a highly respected trader among the Lower Creek tribes in the Georgia and South Carolina region within a few years of arriving in America. Adair praised his skill in negotiating with the Creek to stay neutral during the French and Indian Wars (1760–1761). Eventually he came to own the Silver Bluff trading post. In the 1760s he was involved in a project with fellow trader John Rae encouraging Irish immigration to the region. On the Georgia side of the Savannah River, these immigrants were encouraged to move onto a 50,000-acre (200 km^{2}) tract of land called Queensborough.

== Revolutionary War service ==
During the American Revolution Galphin sided with the Continental Congress, serving as one of its Indian Commissioners for the South. On May 1, 1776, the Creek Nation met as a whole with Galphin, who convinced the Creeks to remain neutral in the burgeoning conflict between the British and the revolutionaries. Galphin owed much of his importance to his Creek wife Metawney of Coweta, who ushered Galphin into the Creek world and facilitated his relationships with her clansmen like Escotchaby and Sempoyaffee, two of the primary headmen of the Lower Creeks during the mid to late eighteenth-century. This successfully frustrated the efforts of the British to enlist sufficient Native American support throughout the South to overpower the comparatively small colonist population. Henry Laurens credited Galphin for helping to secure both Georgia and South Carolina for the Revolution. Joshua Reed Giddings, contemporary abolitionist and one of the founders of the Republican party, took a dimmer view in light of his legacy: "the term “Galphin” has since become synonymous with “peculation” upon the public Treasury”.

== Legacy ==
Following his death in 1780, his estate became involved in protracted litigation. On November 23, 1792, William Dunbar, Galphin estate executor and assistant to Galphin during the Revolution, petitioned Congress on behalf of the Galphin estate for compensation for services rendered as Commissioner of Indian Affairs; the Senate declined to refer the petition to committee. His estate was at dispute in Milligan v. Milledge. The estate eventually became the center of the Galphin Affair political scandal involving prominent political figures such as George W. Crawford.
