= Joseph Clay (Georgia soldier) =

American soldier and politician (1741–1804)

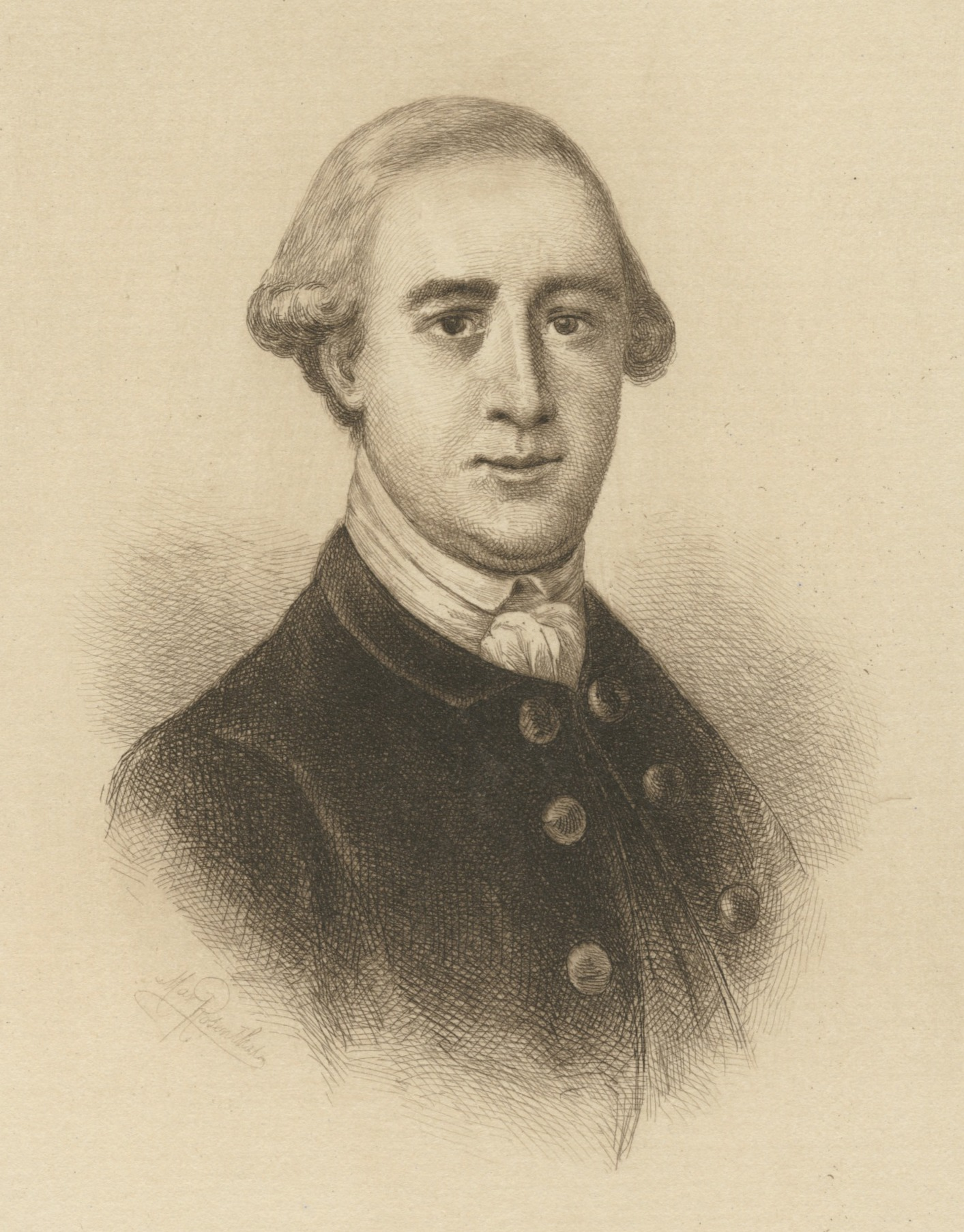

Personal details
- Born: October 16, 1741 Beverley, Great Britain
- Died: November 15, 1804 (aged 63) Boston, Massachusetts, U.S.
- Party: Federalist
- Children: Joseph Clay Jr.
- Relatives: William Henry Stiles (grandson); Henry Harford Cumming (grandson); Alfred Cumming (grandson)
- Education: Princeton University (BA)

Joseph Clay (October 16, 1741 – November 15, 1804) was an American military officer and politician from Georgia.

== Biography ==
Joseph Clay was born in Beverley, Yorkshire, England, and after immigrating to the Thirteen Colonies, settled in Savannah, Georgia in 1760. During the American Revolution, he served on the local council of safety and was a delegate to the Georgia Provincial Congress in 1775. He was a major in the Georgia Line of the Continental Army during the War of Independence. He was appointed by the Continental Congress as deputy paymaster general in Georgia with the rank of colonel on August 6, 1777. He was elected to the Continental Congress in 1778, but did not attend.

Clay was an original trustee of Franklin College, Athens, Ga., which later became the University of Georgia. He was elected treasurer of Georgia in July 1782 and served as judge of the United States Court for the District of Georgia 1786 from 1801.

He was the father of Joseph Clay Jr. and the grandfather of William Henry Stiles, Henry Harford Cumming, and Alfred Cumming.

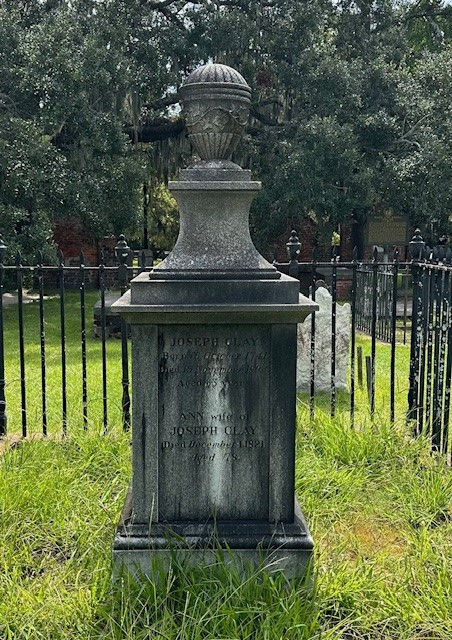
Joseph Clay gravesite in Colonial Park, Savannah

Clay died in 1804 and is buried in Colonial Park in Savannah.
