= Summerville Cemetery =

Cemetery in Augusta, Richmond County, Georgia

Coordinates: 33°28′50″N 82°00′58″W

- Interactive map of Summerville Cemetery

Details
- Location: Augusta, Georgia

Summerville Cemetery is a cemetery in Augusta, Georgia. It is maintained by the City of Augusta.

== Notable interments ==
- George Walker Crawford (1798–1872), Governor of Georgia, US Secretary of War
- Alfred Cumming (1828–1910), Confederate Army general
- Alfred Cumming (1802–1873), Governor of Utah
- Thomas Cumming (1765-1834), first mayor of Augusta, Georgia
- Alfred Cuthbert (1785–1856), US Senator
- William Henry Fleming (1855–1944), US Congressman
- Charles Jones Jenkins (1805–1883), Supreme Court of Georgia Justice, Governor of Georgia, candidate for Vice President and for President of the United States
- John Pendleton King (1799–1888), US Senator
- Joseph Rucker Lamar (1857–1916), Associate Justice in the US Supreme Court
- John Milledge (1757–1818), US Congressman and Senator, Attorney General and Governor of Georgia

== See also ==
- List of burial places of justices of the Supreme Court of the United States
