= Siege of Fort Cooper =

Location	Inverness, Florida 28°48′36″N 82°18′19″W
Result	U.S. Army victory

Belligerents
U.S. Army	Seminoles

Commanders and leaders
Major Mark A. Cooper	Osceola

Units involved
First Georgia Battalion of Volunteers	

Strength
300	500
- Location within Florida

The Siege of Fort Cooper took place in late March and early April of 1836 near Lake Holathlikaha in Florida during the Second Seminole War.

While on their way to present day Tampa, General Winfield Scott's column stopped near the lake and he would leave behind 380 members of the First Georgia Battalion of Volunteers (The Macon Greys) under Major Mark Anthony Cooper to build a fort to protect the sick and wounded soldiers while the column continued to Fort Brooke. The major was ordered to hold the position until relief troops could be sent.

The detachment immediately began chopping down pine trees to construct the fort. After only three days, the troops were discovered by the Seminoles who put them under constant attack. The Seminole force, led by Osceola attacked the fort in force several time over the next 16 days while the defenders supplies ran out. The detachment was nearly out of food and water when the relief column arrived and drove off the Seminoles.

== Historical marker ==
There is an historical marker of the siege near Inverness, Florida off of Old Floral City Road 0.2 miles south of Carnegie Drive within Fort Cooper State Park. Inside the park is a replica stockade at the site of the original fort.
