= Henry Harford Cumming =

American lawyer

Henry Harford Cumming (1799–1866) was a businessman in Augusta, Georgia prior to the American Civil War.

His main business was in cotton but he also engaged J. Edgar Thomson to design the Augusta Canal, in order to run his mills and had started a law firm with politician George W. Crawford. His brother was Governor of Utah Territory Alfred Cumming and his son, Alfred Cumming, was a general in the Confederate States Army.

== Life ==
=== Family ===
In 1799, Henry Harford Cumming was born to Thomas Cumming and Ann Clay, in Augusta, Georgia. In 1798, Cumming's father, Thomas, was the first mayor of Augusta, when the town was first incorporated. Henry Cumming's maternal grandfather was Joseph Clay, one of the first members from Georgia in the First Continental Congress. Clay was additionally a Deputy Paymaster General for the Continental Army during the American Revolutionary War. Henry Cumming's brother, Alfred, was another mayor of Augusta and later the first non-Mormon governor of the Utah Territory.

Another brother of Henry H. Cumming, William, was offered the U.S Army's Quartermaster General position on two occasions, in 1818 and 1847. However, in 1822, William Cumming had gained a nationally notorious reputation when he fought George McDuffie in a duel, on two separate occasions which were believed to have been politically motivated.

John Forsythe, the U.S. Secretary of State at the time, had appointed Henry Cumming to be the U.S. Minister to Spain; mainly he would have served as an attaché at the American Legation. However, Cumming turned down the post; he decided to stay in Georgia to marry Julia A. Bryan of Hancock County.

=== Career ===
In the 1840s, the South—including Georgia—was enduring a downturn in their economy. Henry Cumming envisioned a canal in Augusta to help alleviate some of the economic misfortunes that the town was facing. The county and city of Augusta was considered a commercial epicenter for the southern cotton trade in that region of Georgia and some of the south-eastern region of South Carolina. Augusta is located at the headwaters of the Savannah River which made the city a perfect place to trade and transport goods up and down river.

The 1840s economic situation in the South was precarious for multiple reasons, one definite factor for Augusta to be in bad shape during the period was the depression of 1837; which consequently had significantly lowered the cotton prices. It was Cumming that believed that a canal in Augusta could give the city the vigor it needed to propel out of its distressed lull. Cumming imagined that the canal would allow and give reason for a manufacturing industry to develop in Augusta. The logic behind wanting a manufacturing base in Augusta was that it would balance out its economy giving the city commercial diversity.

The other appeal of the Canal, as Cumming had seen it, is that in the case that it did develop an industrial manufacturing base in Augusta then the South would have something to compete with in the manufacturing industry against the North. Cumming looked at Augusta—if it would build the canal—as a possible "Lowell of the South"--Lowell is a notable industrial center in Massachusetts. These arguments may have been appealing to Cumming, however, they were less inclined to persuade the common Southern plantation owner.

The Industrialization of the South wasn't only discouraged by the southern plantation owner, but also by its local/general public; local citizens overall had mixed reactions to ideas of industrialization. To overcome the public sentiment and doubt: Cumming showed his confidence in the canal project by donating the necessary funds to carry out the initial survey for the site. Cumming had eventually gained the public and private support with his show of confidence and the project was approved. Augusta's city council had established a commission for the canal project and made Cumming the head of that commission.

After the Augusta Canal's completion, Augusta had developed an industrial base for the region. By the 1850s, the canal had allowed for a sawmill, a gristmill, a textile mill, and other types of factories to erect in Augusta; this proved that Cumming's vision had some validity behind it. During the Civil War (1861-1865), the newly founded Confederate Government had built their Confederate Powderworks along two miles of the Augusta Canal. This also shows the importance of the canal to the Southern economy.

Henry Cumming may have had commercial interests and business pursuits, but he was first and foremost a lawyer. Cumming started practicing law when he established his own law firm with his partner George W. Crawford. Crawford went on to be a successful politician and was appointed the Attorney General for the State of Georgia from 1827 to 1831, he then served as a United States congressman in Georgia, which eventually led to him becoming the 38th Governor of Georgia from 1843 to 1847.

Cumming was also driven by a civic duty for his hometown. His strong sense of civic duty had borne many fruits in Georgia, this includes the Augusta Canal—which is his crowned public service achievement. Between the success of the canal and in his business, Cumming gained the confidence of his local brethren and was able to be far more persuasive in his later attempts of civil services. Although Cumming was known for being rather passive in personal affairs, he had once risked his own life to save William H. Pratt from being lynched—Pratt had shot William H. Harding over an insult.

== Cumming's courtship ==
Henry Harford Cumming is known and commonly cited in historical Southern courtship books and papers for his courtship effectiveness. This is most likely because Cumming recorded his courtship with Julia A. Bryan in his journal. He noted that when he had the intention to write love letters to his "sweetheart," he found that "he just wrote about himself" and that he tended to "display accomplishments in fine style" rather than trying to "romance" Miss Bryan.

Cumming had married his sweetheart, Julia A. Bryan, with the support and encouragement of both of their families. Cumming and Bryan shared a successful forty-year marriage, which produced eight children. Cumming married Julia close to Mount Zion, Georgia, at the Rotherwood Plantation on February 24, 1824.
