= Galphin Affair =

Disputed settlement of US estate

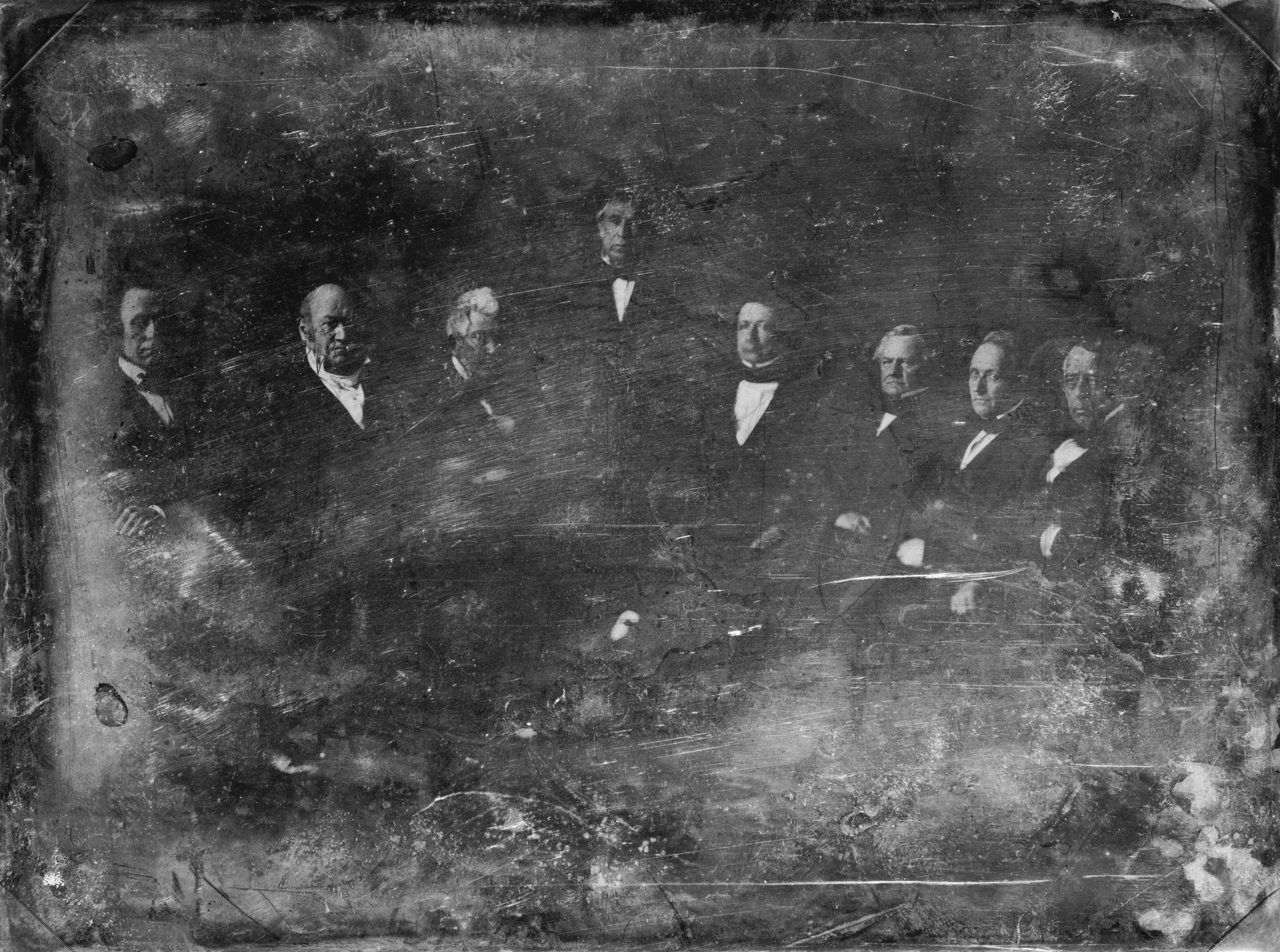
The Galphin Affair

The Galphin Affair was the disputed settlement over the Galphin estate, where George W. Crawford took 50% of the claim for himself. Crawford at the time was working as a part of President Zachary Taylor's cabinet.

== Background ==
George Galphin was an Irish immigrant and an Indian trader. He was very successful and respected for his work. He had a large land claim in what became the territory of Georgia, but after his death and the Revolutionary War the colonial government took claim over the Galphin estate. Arguing they were due compensation for their losses during war time, the Galphin family fought the US Government in litigation for over 70 years but it wasn't until the early 1840s that any financial compensation was received.

== Resolving the claim ==
Georgia's Governor, George Crawford, took up the case helping the Galphin family fight for their estate, under the agreement to keep 50% of the claim for himself. During his last days in office as Governor, the claim went through Congress and went almost completely unnoticed it passed into law. The law directed the Secretary of Treasury to pay the dues for the estate. Crawford was to receive $43,518.97; this was the principal of the claim (no interest was allowed).

In 1849, Zachary Taylor asked George Crawford to be a part of his cabinet. He became Secretary of War and from that position he gained many new connections and allies. He brought up the case to United States Attorney General Reverdy Johnson and Secretary of the Treasury William Meredith. The Galphin family and Crawford demanded that interest be paid on the estate.

At the time Congress was in session, but the three officials decided to settle the claim on their own. On May 2, 1850, the Secretary of Treasury paid out $192,352.89 for the land and interest. William Meredith kept $3,000 for himself while Crawford kept $94,176.44.

== Afterwards ==
When the public found out about the Galphin estate's resolution they were outraged. This led to Crawford's resignation and though the public demanded an investigation, there never was a punishment for the Secretary of War or his allies. Crawford retired and lived off the money he made from the settlement.
