= Mark A. Cooper =

American politician

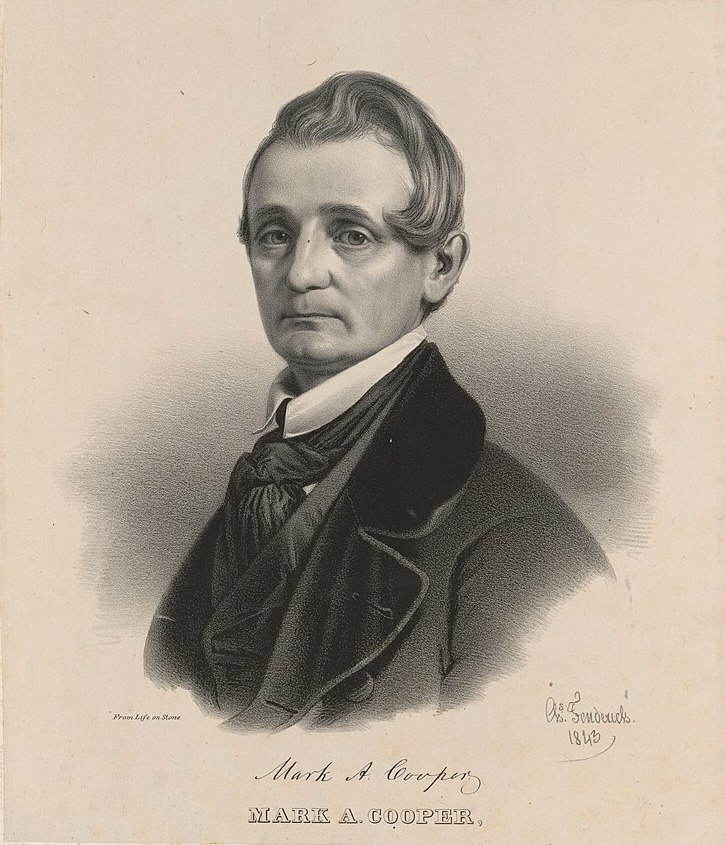
- Portrait, c. 1843

Member of the U.S. House of Representatives from Georgia's at-large district
- In office January 3, 1842 – June 26, 1843
- Preceded by: William C. Dawson
- Succeeded by: Alexander H. Stephens
- In office March 4, 1839 – March 3, 1841
- Preceded by: George W. Owens
- Succeeded by: Thomas F. Foster

Personal details
- Born: April 20, 1800 Powelton, Georgia, U.S.
- Died: March 17, 1885 (aged 84) Cartersville, Georgia, U.S.
- Party: Democratic (until 1842); Whig (until 1841)
- Spouse(s): Evaline Flournoy; Sophornia Randle
- Relations: Eugenius Aristides Nisbet (cousin)
- Education: South Carolina College

Mark Anthony Cooper (April 20, 1800 – March 17, 1885) was an American politician, businessman and lawyer who was a U.S. representative from Georgia. He owned an iron works in Etowah and was president of the Cartersville-Van Wert Railroad.

== Biography ==
=== Early life and family ===
Cooper was born near Powelton, Georgia, in Hancock County in 1800. His cousin was U.S. Representative Eugenius Aristides Nisbet. He graduated from South Carolina College (now the University of South Carolina) in Columbia in 1819. After studying law and gaining admittance to the state bar in 1821, he practiced law in Eatonton, Georgia. He later moved to Columbus, Georgia. Cooper was first married to Evaline Flournoy, sometime around 1821, but she died three months into their marriage. He then remarried in 1826 to Sophronia Randle. The two had eleven children, seven who survived infancy.

=== Military and political careers ===
In 1836, Cooper fought in the Second Seminole War and commanded a battalion of Georgia Volunteers during a difficult siege of Fort Cooper. He rose to the rank of major. During the war, Cooper distinguished himself and reiterated his belief in states' rights by refusing to turn over 3,000 pounds of bacon to federal authorities because it was sent to feed Georgia militia men. Fort Cooper, a military fortification built during the war, was commanded by and named in honor of Cooper.

In 1833, Cooper served in the Georgia House of Representatives. In 1838, he was elected as a Whig Representative from Georgia to the 26th United States Congress and served one term in that seat from March 4, 1839, until March 3, 1841, as he lost his bid for reelection in 1840. He returned to the U.S. Congress in 1842 after winning election as a Democrat to fill the remainder of the term of William Crosby Dawson, who had resigned in 1841 to run for the Governor of Georgia. Cooper was reelected to that congressional seat in the general election in 1842; however, he resigned in 1843 to run an unsuccessful candidacy for Governor. Cooper's second stint in Congress lasted from January 3, 1842, to June 26, 1843.

=== "Iron Man of Georgia" ===
During his time as an attorney, Cooper was a lender essentially functioning as the local bank in Eatonton. He then invested in a bank in Columbus, Georgia and after a few years, sold out for $300,000 which he used to build his iron works nearby Etowah, Georgia. This ironworks is remembered today by many names: Cooper's Furnace, Cooper's Ironworks, and Etowah Ironworks.

After his political service, Cooper became president of the Etowah Manufacturing and Mining Company in Etowah, Georgia, in 1859.

The iron works included large facilities for making nails and another plant for making pots and pans out of iron. But the most famous plant was one for making cannon during the Civil War. These cannon were highly regarded for their higher quality (not exploding as others did). Cooper sold his iron works to another company in 1862 for $400,000 in Confederate currency. The iron works were soon taken over by the Confederacy. Most of the town of Etowah was destroyed during Sherman's March on Atlanta; however, the iron furnaces themselves were left standing.

Cooper's investments in Confederate notes and bonds became worthless with the defeat of the Confederacy. Shortly after the war, in 1866, the Cartersville-Van Wert Railroad was chartered by the Georgia State Assembly. Cooper was appointed its first president.

He died at his home, Glen Holly, 6 miles (9.7 km) northeast of Cartersville, Georgia, on March 17, 1885, where he was buried. He was 84 years old.

Party political offices
Preceded by Charles James McDonald	Democratic nominee for Governor of Georgia; 1843	Succeeded by Matthew Hall McAllister
U.S. House of Representatives
Preceded by Thomas Glascock	Member of the U.S. House of Representatives from Georgia's at-large congressional district March 4, 1839 – March 3, 1841	Succeeded by James Archibald Meriwether
Preceded by William Crosby Dawson	Member of the U.S. House of Representatives from Georgia's at-large congressional district January 3, 1842 – June 26, 1843	Succeeded by Alexander Stephens
