= William C. Dawson =

American politician

William Crosby Dawson
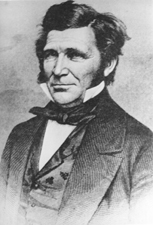

Clerk of the Georgia House of Representatives
- In office 1821 – c. 1833
- Preceded by: William Turner
- Succeeded by: Robert W. Carnes

Member of the Georgia Senate from Greene County
- In office 1834–1835
- Preceded by: Nicholas Lewis
- Succeeded by: Thomas G. Janes

Member of the U.S. House of Representatives from Georgia's at-large district
- In office November 7, 1836 – November 13, 1841
- Preceded by: John E. Coffee
- Succeeded by: Mark A. Cooper

Judge, Ocmulgee Circuit Court, Georgia
- In office 1845–?

United States Senator from Georgia
- In office March 4, 1849 – March 3, 1855
- Preceded by: Herschel V. Johnson
- Succeeded by: Alfred Iverson, Sr.

Personal details
- Born: January 4, 1798 Greensboro, Georgia
- Died: May 5, 1856 (aged 58) Greensboro, Georgia
- Party: States' Rights Party, Whig
- Spouse: Henrietta M. Wingfield ( – 4/7/1850)
- Education: Franklin College (1816)
- Profession: Lawyer

Military service
- Branch/service: United States Army
- Rank: Captain
- Battles/wars: Creek and Seminole Indian War

William Crosby Dawson (January 4, 1798 – May 5, 1856) was a lawyer, judge, politician, and soldier from Georgia.

== Early life, education, and legal career ==
Dawson was born in Greensboro, Greene County, Georgia, January 4, 1798. His parents were George Dawson, Sr. and Katie Ruth Marston Skidmore.

After taking an academic course from the Rev. Dr. Cumming, Dawson attended the county academy in Greensboro, and then was graduated from Franklin College, Athens, Clarke County, Georgia, in 1816 at the age of 18. He studied law for a year in the office of the Hon. Thomas W. Cobb, at Lexington, Oglethorpe County, Georgia, and then in the Litchfield Law School of judges Tapping Reeve and James Gould at Litchfield, Connecticut. In 1818, he was admitted to the bar.

Dawson set up a practice in Greensboro, where he was a successful jury lawyer. He was known for his ability to settle cases out of court.

In 1819, he married Henrietta M. Wingfield. They had eight children. His wife died in 1850. Dawson remarried in 1854 to Eliza M. Williams of Memphis, Tennessee.

Dawson was elected as one of the vice presidents of the Alumni Society of the University of Georgia at its first meeting, on August 4, 1834.

== Political and military career ==
He was elected Clerk of the Georgia House of Representatives in 1821 and served twelve years in that post. From 1828, he compiled Dawson's Digest of Laws of Georgia, published in 1831.

From 1834 to 1835, he served as a state senator.

In 1836, he was Captain of Volunteers under General Winfield Scott in the Creek and Seminole Indian War in Florida.

Dawson was elected as a States' Rights candidate to the United States House of Representatives for the 24th United States Congress in a special election to fill the vacancy caused by the death of General John E. Coffee, taking office on December 26, 1836. He was re-elected as a Whig to the 25th, 26th, and 27th Congresses. He served from November 7, 1836, to November 13, 1841.

He was the Whig candidate for Governor of Georgia in 1841 but was defeated by Charles James McDonald. He thought his defeat as gubernatorial candidate meant that voters disapproved of his congressional service, particularly his vote earlier in the year to tax coffee and tea. He resigned from Congress.

During his service in the United States House, Dawson chaired the Committee on Mileage (25th Congress), the Committee on Claims (26th Congress), and the Committee on Military Affairs (27th Congress).

He was appointed by Governor George W. Crawford to fill a vacancy as Judge of the Ocmulgee Circuit Court in 1845, but he declined to run as a candidate for the bench at the completion of his term.

Dawson was elected by the state legislature in November 1847 as the Whig candidate for Georgia's Class 3 seat in the United States Senate for the 31st, 32nd, and 33rd Congresses, serving from March 4, 1849, to March 3, 1855. Dawson supported the compromises that preserved the union in 1850. He chaired the Committee on Private Land Claims (32nd Congress) and presided over the Southern convention at Memphis in 1853.

He was twice a delegate to the convention to amend the U.S. Constitution.

== Freemason ==
Dawson was initiated to the Scottish Rite Freemasonry at the "San Marino" Lodge No. 34, Greensboro, GA. He was elected Grand Master of the Grand Lodge of Free and Accepted Masons in Georgia on November 8, 1843 and served in that capacity until his death in 1856. While in Congress, he was active in local Freemasonry. The Dawson Lodge in Washington, D.C. and the Dawson Lodge in Social Circle, Georgia were named for him.

== Death and legacy ==
Dawson died in Greensboro on May 5, 1856, and was buried in Greensboro Cemetery with Masonic rites following a service in the Presbyterian church. A historical sign was placed in his honor in Greensboro.

Because of his elegant manners, he was called "the first gentleman of Georgia" by Joseph Henry Lumpkin.

Joshua Reed Giddings described him: "He was a man of much suavity of manner; one of that class of Southern statesmen who felt it necessary to carry every measure by the influence of personal kindness, and an expression of horror at all agitation of the slave question, under the apprehension that it might dissolve the Union."

Dawson County, Georgia, and the county seat, Dawsonville, were named for William Crosby Dawson. The county was created by a legislative act on December 3, 1857, primarily out of Lumpkin County and small parts of Gilmer, Pickens and Forsyth counties. Dawson, the county seat of Terrell County, Georgia was incorporated on December 22, 1857, and named for William Crosby Dawson.

Company C, 3d Regiment, Georgia Volunteer Infantry, Army of Northern Virginia, C.S.A., from Greene County, was called the "Dawson Grays" in his honor.

== Bibliography ==
- United States Congress. "William C. Dawson (id: D000156)". Biographical Directory of the United States Congress. NB: has error in date admitted to bar.
- A collection of family records, with biographical sketches and other memoranda of various families and individuals bearing the name Dawson, or allied to families of that name. Comp. by Charles C. Dawson, pp 368–385. Albany, N.Y.: J. Munsell, 1874.
- Will of George Dawson, Sr.

== See also ==
- George Oscar Dawson, his third child
- Edgar Gilmer Dawson, his fifth child

== Notes ==
Party political offices
Preceded by Charles Dougherty	Whig nominee for Governor of Georgia; 1841	Succeeded by George W. Crawford
U.S. House of Representatives
Preceded by John E. Coffee	Member of the U.S. House of Representatives from Georgia's at-large congressional district November 7, 1836 – November 13, 1841	Succeeded by Mark A. Cooper
U.S. Senate
Preceded by Herschel V. Johnson	U.S. senator (Class 3) from Georgia; March 4, 1849 – March 3, 1855; Served alongside: John M. Berrien, Robert M. Charlton, Robert A. Toombs	Succeeded by Alfred Iverson, Sr.
