= Fort Cooper State Park =

Park in Inverness, Florida, US

- IUCN category III (natural monument or feature)
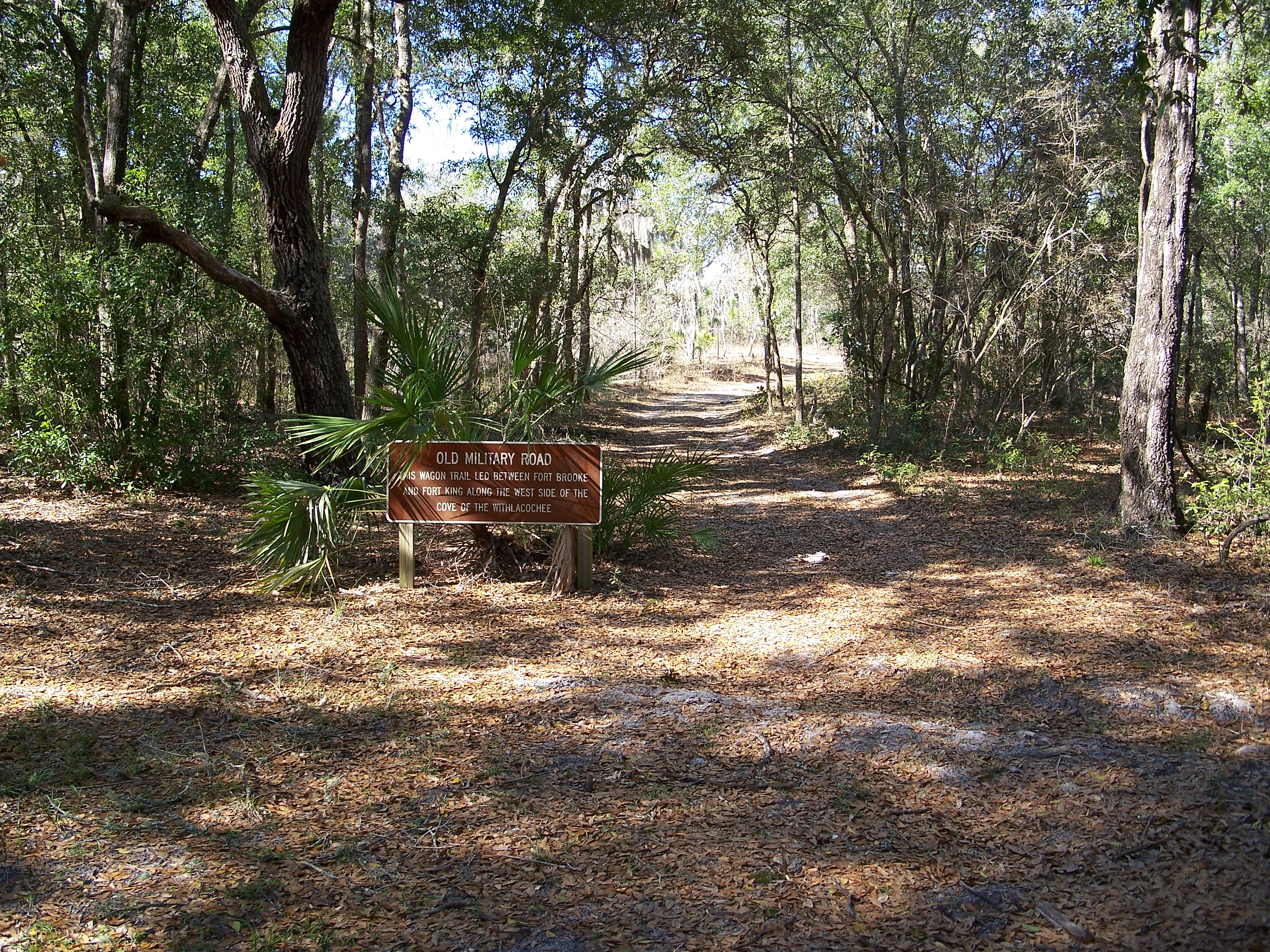
- A view of the old military road

- Location within Florida Location within the United States
- Interactive map of Fort Cooper State Park
- Location: Citrus County, Florida, United States
- Nearest city: Inverness, Florida
- Coordinates: 28°48′36″N 82°18′19″W
- Area: 710 acres (2.9 km^{2})
- Established: June 13, 1972
- Governing body: Florida Department of Environmental Protection

Fort Cooper State Park is a 710-acre historic site in Inverness, Florida, United States. It is located two miles (3 km) south of Inverness, off of U.S. Hwy. 41 on South Old Floral City Road. On June 13, 1972, it was added to the United States National Register of Historic Places. It is also a Florida State Park.

== History ==
Major Mark Anthony Cooper built the fort beside Lake Holathlikaha in April 1836 to shelter sick and wounded soldiers during the Second Seminole War. None of the original fort survives; park staff and volunteers built a replica of its southwest corner near its original location.

== Fauna ==
Among the wildlife of the park are white-tailed deer, wild turkey, opossum, rabbit, bobcat, owls, herons and cardinals.

== Recreational activities ==
The park features an annual re-enactment during March of the Siege of Fort Cooper during the Second Seminole War. Activities include fishing, swimming, sunbathing, youth camping, canoeing, hiking, boat tours, and nature viewing. The park is also accessible from the Withlacoochee State Trail.

== Amenities and hours ==
Amenities include access to 160-acre (0.65 km^{2}) Lake Holathlikaha, a swimming area, paddleboat and canoe rentals, a picnic and playground area, and nearly 5 miles (8.0 km) of hiking trails. The park also has nature trails, a beach, and a primitive campground.

Florida state parks are open between 8 a.m. and sundown every day of the year (including holidays).

== Gallery ==
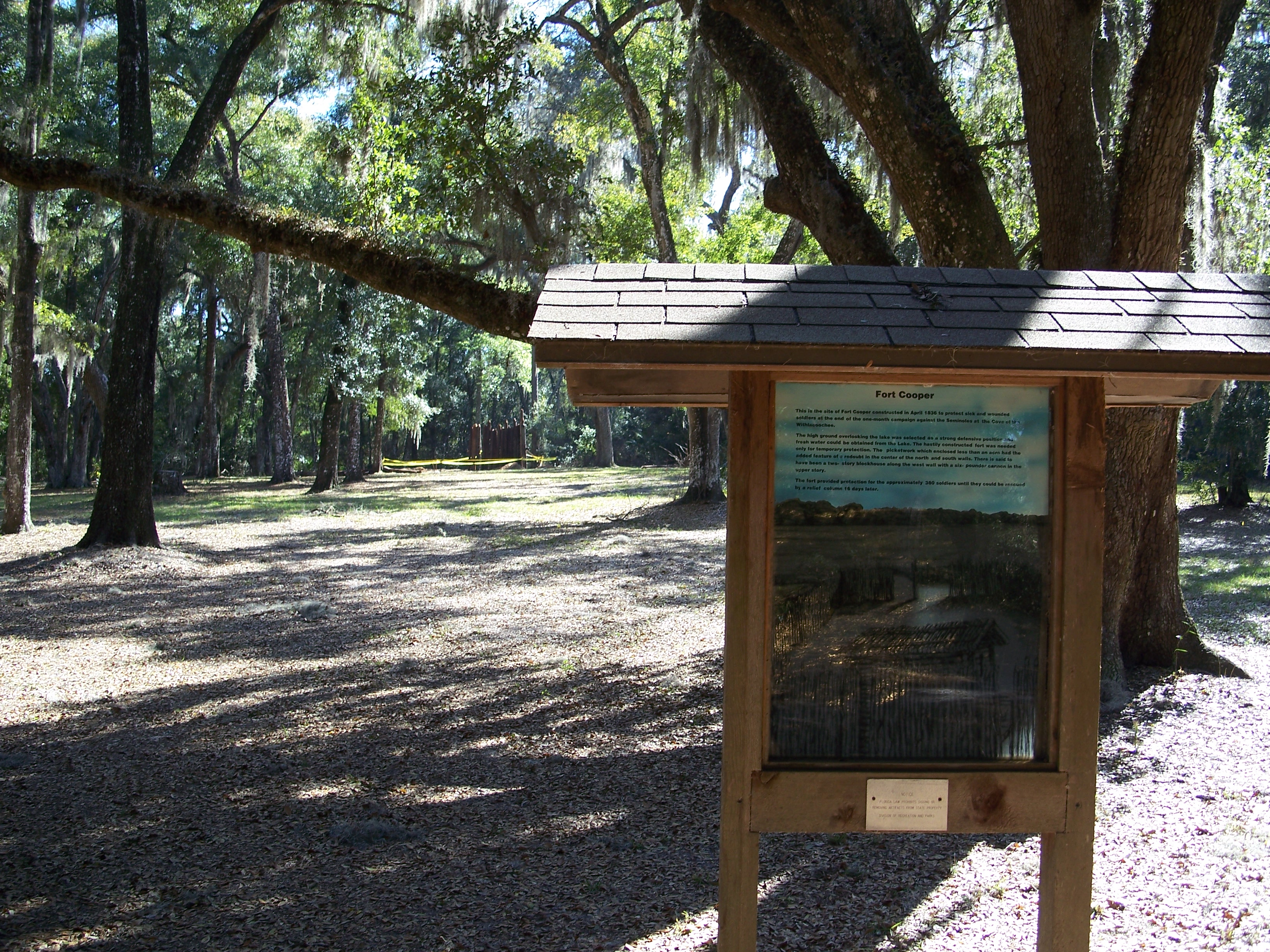
Fort Cooper

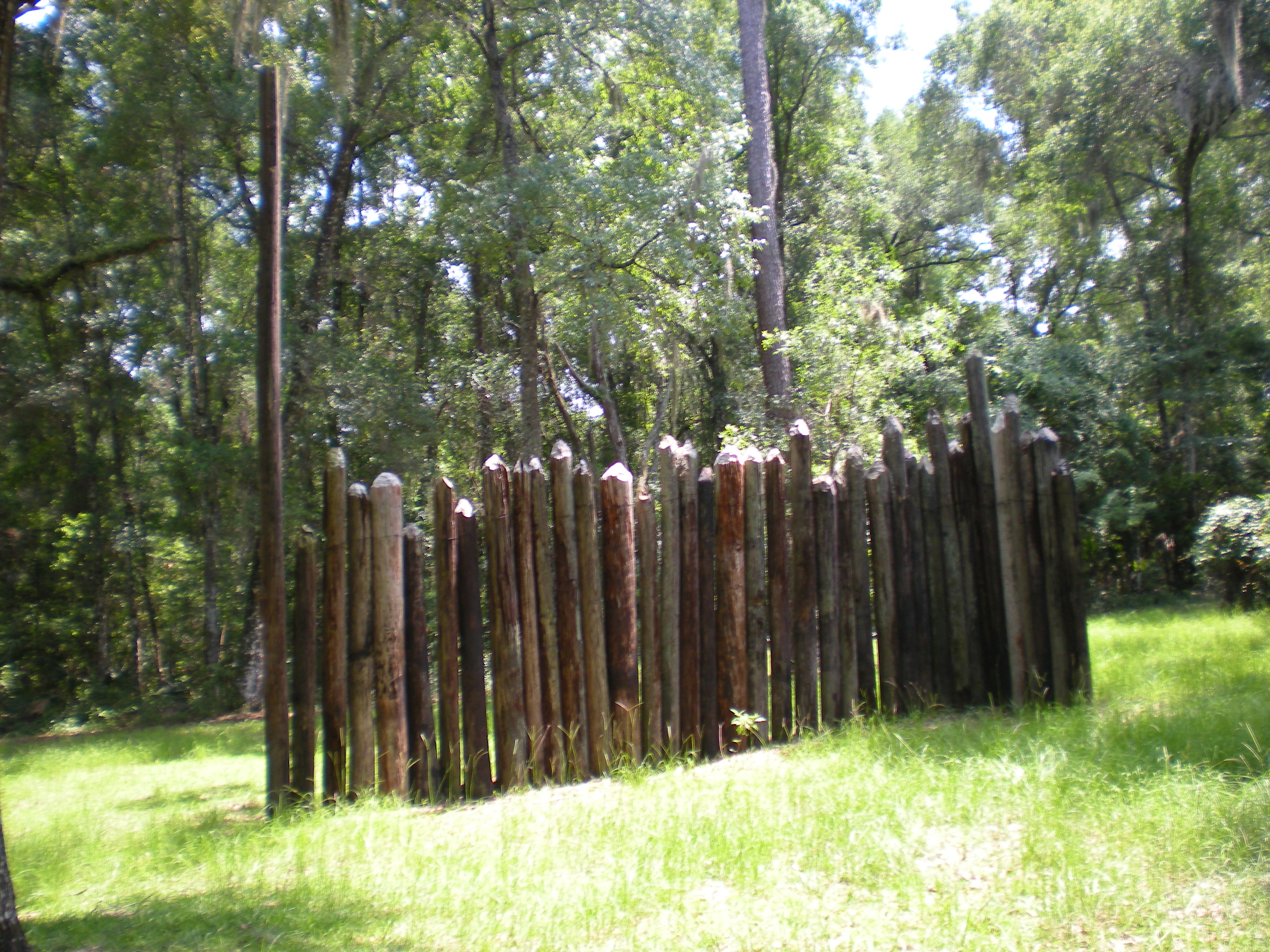
Fort Cooper site

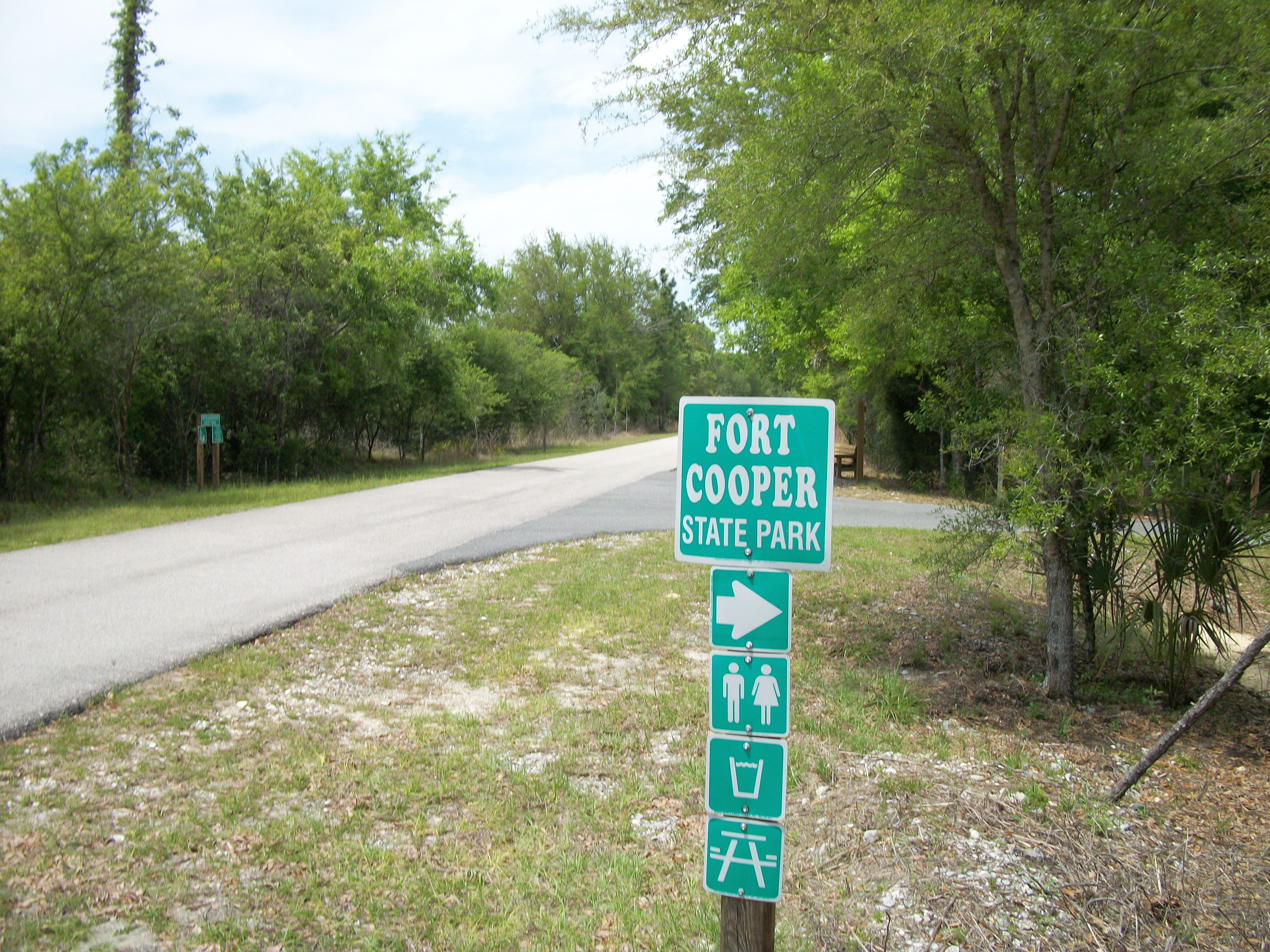
Entrance to the park from Withlacoochee State Trail
