= Alfred Cumming (general) =

Confederate Army general (1829–1910)

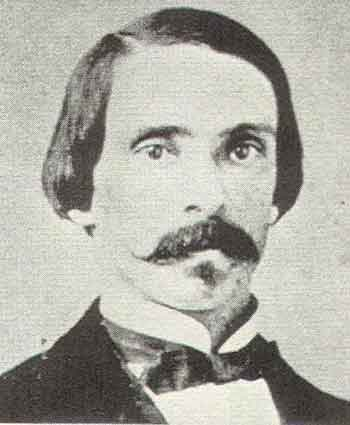
- Born: January 30, 1829; Augusta, Georgia, U.S.
- Died: December 5, 1910 (aged 81); Rome, Georgia, U.S.
- Burial place: Summerville Cemetery (Augusta, Georgia)
- Military career
- Allegiance: United States of America; Confederate States of America
- Branch: United States Army; Confederate States Army
- Service years: 1849–1861; 1861–1865
- Rank: Captain (USA); Brigadier General (CSA)
- Unit: 1st Georgia Infantry Regiment
- Commands: 10th Georgia Infantry Regiment; Cumming's Brigade
- Conflicts: Utah War; American Civil War

Alfred Cumming (January 30, 1829 – December 5, 1910) was a Confederate brigadier general in the American Civil War.

== Early life ==
Born in Augusta, Georgia, he was the son of Henry Harford Cumming, a cotton magnate, and Julia Ann (Bryan) Cumming. At twenty, he graduated from West Point, ranking 35th in his class of 43. In the prewar United States Army, he served mainly in the West, including two years in Louisiana as an aide to Brig. Gen. David E. Twiggs. Later he accompanied Albert Sidney Johnston's expedition to Utah Territory, where he aided his uncle, Alfred Cumming (the Governor of Utah) in the Utah War.

== Civil War ==
Flag of Cumming's Brigade, 1863.

In January 1861, he resigned a captaincy in the 10th United States Infantry to accept the Lieutenant Colonelcy of the Augusta Volunteer Battalion. He soon resigned that position to become major of the 1st Georgia Infantry. By June, he was the Lieutenant Colonel of the 10th Georgia Infantry Regiment and four months later its colonel, succeeding Lafayette McLaws. He served with distinction during the Peninsula Campaign of 1862, including the Battle of Yorktown, the Battle of Savage's Station, and the Battle of Malvern Hill, where he was wounded. His performance earned him the temporary command of an Alabama brigade prior to the Maryland Campaign due to the illness of Brigadier General Cadmus M. Wilcox.

On September 14, 1862, Cumming's brigade came up quickly to support troops under Brig. Gen. Howell Cobb, forced back from Crampton's Gap by a Federal offensive. His promptness helped keep the Union advance from its objective, Harpers Ferry. He was awarded a brigadier general's star six weeks later. Afterward, Cumming went west: first to Mobile, then in April 1863 to Mississippi as a subordinate to Lt. Gen. John C. Pemberton. He led a brigade in Maj. Gen. Carter L. Stevenson's division at Champion's Hill and in the actions outside Vicksburg. Captured and paroled with the city's garrison, he reorganized Stevenson's old brigade at Decatur, Georgia, in the fall of 1863 and led it gallantly at Missionary Ridge.

He was conspicuous in many actions during the Atlanta campaign, winning praise for several successful and unsuccessful attacks. At Jonesboro, he was disabled by another wound.

== Postbellum ==
In postwar years, he farmed in Floyd County, Georgia before moving to Rome, Georgia, and then to his native city.

Cumming died in Rome, Georgia, and was buried in Summerville Cemetery.

== See also ==
- List of American Civil War generals (Confederate)

== Notes ==
Preceded by Lafayette McLaws	Colonel of the 10th Georgia Regiment; September 25, 1861–October 29, 1862	Succeeded by John B. Weems
