= 10th Georgia Infantry Regiment =

Infantry regiment of the Confederate States Army

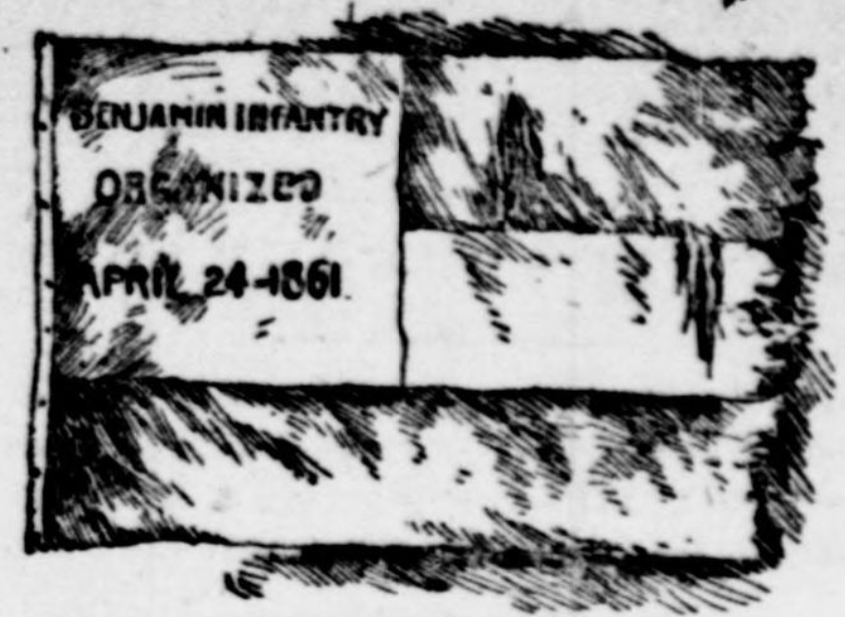
- Flag of Company E
- Active: June, 1861–April 9, 1865
- Country: Confederate States of America
- Allegiance: Georgia
- Branch: Confederate States Army
- Type: Infantry
- Engagements: American Civil War: Battle of Cedar Creek

Commanders
- Notable commanders: Colonel Lafayette McLaws; Colonel Alfred Cumming; Colonel John B. Weems; Colonel Willis C. Holt; Colonel Andrew J. McBride

The 10th Georgia Infantry Regiment was an infantry regiment that served in the Confederate States Army during the American Civil War. It participated in most of the key battles of Robert E. Lee's Army of Northern Virginia.

The regiment was raised in various counties throughout the state of Georgia and was organized at Jonesboro, Georgia, in June 1861, and in July moved to Virginia. It was initially assigned to Magruder's Peninsula Division. It served with the Army of Northern Virginia for the entire war, except during Longstreet's late 1863 expedition to Georgia and East Tennessee. The regiment was assigned to the Semmes-Bryan-Simms brigade.

== Organization ==
=== Staff ===
- Colonel
  - Lafayette McLaws (June 17, 1861, to September 25, 1861; Promoted to Brigadier General)
  - Alfred Cumming (September 25, 1861, to October 29, 1862; Promoted to Brigadier General)
  - John B. Weems (October 29, 1862, to May 19, 1864; Retired to the Invalid Corps)
  - Willis C. Holt (May 19, 1864, to October, 1864 - Willis C. Holt died from wounds that occurred Oct. 19 1864 suffered at Cedar Creek, VA)
  - Andrew J. McBride (March 2, 1865, to rank from February 20, 1865, to the end of the war)
- Lieutenant Colonel
  - Alfred Cumming (June, 1861 to September 25, 1861)
  - John B. Weems (September 25, 1861, to October 29, 1862)
  - Willis C. Holt (October 29, 1862, to May 19, 1864; Killed in action, Battle of Cedar Creek, Virginia)
  - Charles C. Kibbee (Promoted for valor and skill on March 2, 1865, to date from February 20, 1865, to end of war)
- Major
  - John B. Weems (July 4, 1861, to September 25, 1861)
  - R. R. Hawes (September 25, 1861, to August 4, 1862; Resigned due to disability)
  - Willis C. Holt (August 4, 1862, to October 29, 1862)
  - Philologus H. Loud (October 29, 1862, to February 13, 1865; Retired)

=== Companies ===
- Company A - Confederate Sentinels (Muscogee County)
- Company B - Letcher Guards (Richmond County)
- Company C - Chattahoochee Beauregards (Chattahoochee County)
- Company D - Independent Blues (Richmond County)
- Company E - Clayton Sharpshooters (Clayton County)
- Company F - Thomson Guards (Columbia County)
- Company G - (Pulaski County)
- Company H - Wilcox County Rifles (Wilcox County)
- Company I - Fayette Grey Guards (Campbell and Fayette Counties)
- Company K - Davis Musketeers (Richmond County) Corporal Gabriel Waters

== Battles ==
- Back River [five companies] (July 24, 1861)
- Yorktown (April 1862)
- Lee's Mill (April 16, 1862)
- Williamsburg [skirmish] (May 4, 1862)
- Ellison's Mill, New Bridge, and Mechanicsville [skirmishes] [Companies C, E, and I] (May 23–24, 1862)
- Seven Days Battles (June 25-July 1, 1862)
- Savage's Station (June 29, 1862)
- Allen's Farm (July 1, 1862)
- Malvern Hill (July 1, 1862)
- South Mountain (September 14, 1862)
- Antietam (September 17, 1862)
- Fredericksburg (December 13, 1862)
- Chancellorsville (May 1–4, 1863)
- Gettysburg (July 1–3, 1863)
- Chickamauga [not engaged] (September 19–20, 1863)
- Chattanooga Siege (September–November 1863)
- Knoxville Siege (November–December 1863)
- The Wilderness (May 5–6, 1864)
- Spotsylvania Court House (May 8–21, 1864)
- North Anna (May 23–26, 1864)
- Cold Harbor (June 1–3, 1864)
- Petersburg Siege (June 1864-April 1865)
- Cedar Creek (October 19, 1864)
- Sayler's Creek (April 6, 1865)
- Appomattox Court House (April 9, 1865)

== See also ==
- List of Civil War regiments from Georgia
