= Edgar Gilmer Dawson =

American lawyer

- Born: March 6, 1830; Greensboro, Georgia, U.S.
- Died: April 24, 1883 (aged 53); Baltimore, Maryland, U.S.
- Education: University of Georgia (A.B., 1849)
- Spouse: Lucy F. Terrell (m. 1856)
- Military career
- Allegiance: Confederate States of America
- Branch: Confederate States Army
- Service years: 1861–1864
- Rank: Major
- Unit: Terrell Light Artillery
- Known for: Edgar Gilmer Dawson Fund, Dawson Hall named in his honor
- Conflicts: American Civil War
- Other work: Planter, Lawyer

Edgar Gilmer Dawson (March 6, 1830 – April 24, 1883) was an American planter and lawyer. He was born in Greensboro, Georgia, and was one of the Greene County Dawsons, the fifth child of Senator William Crosby Dawson.

In 1849 he received an A.B. from the University of Georgia and he married Lucy F. Terrell, daughter of Dr. William Terrell of Sparta, Georgia, in 1856.

Dawson served as captain and later Major of the Terrell Light Artillery from 1861 to 1864 during the Civil War. After 1867, he became a resident of Baltimore, Maryland.

The Edgar Gilmer Dawson Fund supports agricultural education at the University of Georgia. Dawson Hall, which houses the College of Family and Consumer Sciences, was named for him.
