= Charles James McDonald =

American judge

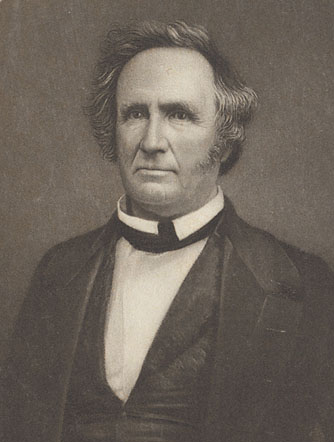

37th Governor of Georgia
- In office November 6, 1839 – November 8, 1843
- Preceded by: George R. Gilmer
- Succeeded by: George W. Crawford

Personal details
- Born: July 9, 1793 Charleston, South Carolina, U.S.
- Died: December 16, 1860 (aged 67) Marietta, Georgia, U.S.

Charles James McDonald (July 9, 1793 – December 16, 1860) was an American attorney, jurist and politician.

He was born in Charleston, South Carolina and moved with his family to Hancock County, Georgia in 1794.

He served as a brigadier general in the Georgia Militia from 1823 to 1825.

McDonald served as the 37th governor of Georgia from 1839 to 1843, defeating the Whig candidate William Crosby Dawson. In addition to serving in the Georgia Senate and Georgia House of Representatives, McDonald also served as a justice of the Supreme Court of Georgia.

McDonald died in Marietta, Georgia in 1860 and was buried in the Episcopal Cemetery in that same city.

Party political offices
First	Democratic nominee for Governor of Georgia; 1841	Succeeded by Mark Anthony Cooper
Political offices
Preceded by George R. Gilmer	Governor of Georgia; 1839–1843	Succeeded by George W. Crawford
