= Joseph Clay Jr. =

American judge (1764–1811)

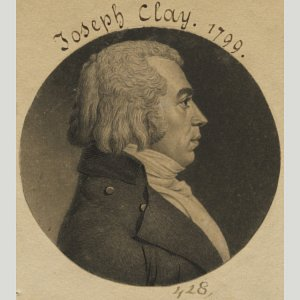

Judge of the United States District Court for the District of Georgia
- In office September 16, 1796 – May 12, 1801
- Appointed by: George Washington
- Preceded by: Nathaniel Pendleton
- Succeeded by: William Stephens

Personal details
- Born: Joseph Clay Jr. August 16, 1764 Savannah, Province of Georgia, British America
- Died: January 11, 1811 (aged 46) Boston, Massachusetts
- Parent: Joseph Clay (father)
- Education: Princeton University read law

Joseph Clay Jr. (August 16, 1764 – January 11, 1811) was a United States district judge of the United States District Court for the District of Georgia and was a Baptist pastor.

== Education and career ==
Clay was the son of Joseph Clay, an American Revolutionary War figure. Born on August 16, 1764, in Savannah, Province of Georgia, British America, Clay graduated from the College of New Jersey (now Princeton University) in 1784 and read law in 1790. He entered private practice in Savannah, Georgia from 1790 to 1796.

== Federal judicial service ==
Clay received a recess appointment from President George Washington on September 16, 1796, to a seat on the United States District Court for the District of Georgia vacated by Judge Nathaniel Pendleton. He was nominated to the same position by President Washington on December 21, 1796. He was confirmed by the United States Senate on December 27, 1796, and received his commission on January 2, 1797. His service terminated on May 12, 1801, due to his resignation.

Clay was nominated by President John Adams to the United States Circuit Court for the Fifth Circuit on February 21, 1801. He was confirmed by the Senate on February 24, 1801, but declined the appointment.

== Later career ==
Following his resignation from the federal bench, Clay resumed private practice in Savannah from 1802 to 1804. He was an assistant pastor in Savannah from 1804 to 1807. He was pastor of the First Baptist Church in Boston, Massachusetts from 1807 to 1809.

Clay died on January 11, 1811, in Boston.

== Sources ==
Legal offices
| Preceded by Nathaniel Pendleton | Judge of the United States District Court for the District of Georgia; 1796–1801 | Succeeded by William Stephens |
