= Alfred Cumming (governor) =

American politician

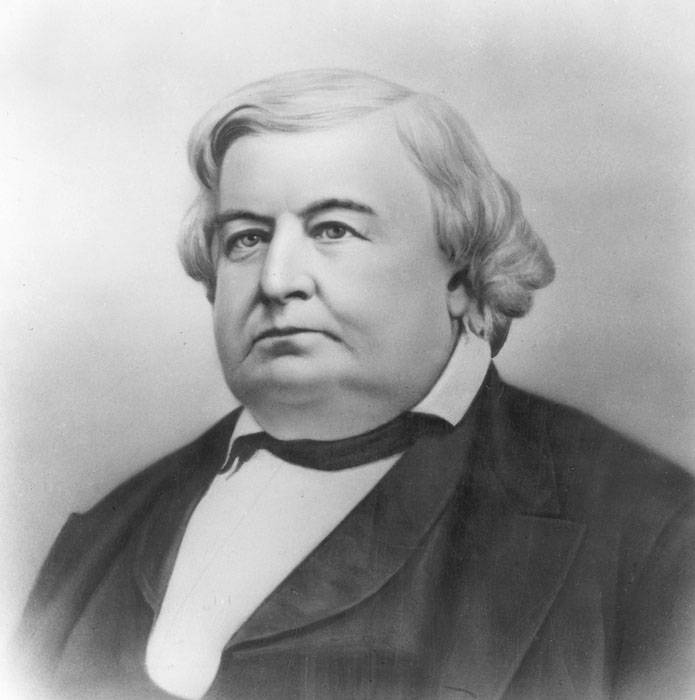

2nd Governor of Utah Territory
- In office April 12, 1858 – May 17, 1861
- President: James Buchanan
- Preceded by: Brigham Young
- Succeeded by: John W. Dawson

Mayor of Augusta, Georgia
- In office 1836–1837
- Preceded by: Samuel Hale
- Succeeded by: John Phinizy
- In office 1839–1840
- Preceded by: Samuel Hale
- Succeeded by: Daniel Hook

Personal details
- Born: September 4, 1802 Augusta, Georgia, U.S.
- Died: October 9, 1873 (aged 71)
- Resting place: Summerville Cemetery, Augusta, Georgia
- Party: Democratic
- Spouse: Elizabeth Randall Cumming

Alfred Cumming (September 4, 1802 – October 9, 1873) was an American politician who served as the governor of the Utah Territory from April 12, 1858, to May 17, 1861. Cumming succeeded Brigham Young as governor following the Utah War.

== Career ==
Cumming served two non-consecutive terms as mayor of Augusta, Georgia first from 1836 to 1837, and again from 1839 to 1840. While he was mayor, he worked to curb a yellow fever epidemic in the city. During the outbreak, there were approximately 1,500 to 2,000 cases, and 240 deaths. In 1841, Cumming was presented with an elaborate silver vase from the citizens of Augusta in recognition of his efforts during what its inscription called the "Calamitous Epidemic of 1839." Manufactured by Boston silversmiths Harris & Stanwood, the vase weighed 400 ounces and cost $1,500 at the time. Its inscription praised the "vigilance, fearlessness, and humanity" that distinguished his mayoralty during the epidemic. His father, Thomas Cumming, had previously held the mayoral position as “intendent” in 1798.

During the Mexican-American War, Cumming worked as a sutler to Zachary Taylor’s army and at Jefferson Barracks.

Cumming was appointed superintendent of the Central Superintendency under the Superintendency System on April 23, 1853. In 1855, he participated in negotiating the Judith River Treaty with the Blackfeet nation, which established the Blackfeet Indian Reservation. After this, Cumming arrived in Utah in the spring of 1858, to negotiate the Mormon question, along with other topics like slavery and polygamy, in the Utah Territory.

A Democrat, Cumming was appointed as the second governor of the Utah Territory by President James Buchanan. On July 13, 1857, he received this commission and set out that same September with an attachment of soldiers led by Colonel Albert Sidney Johnston as part of the Utah Expedition. At the time, Brigham Young, leader of the Church of Jesus Christ of the Latter-day Saints, was acting as interim governor of the Utah Territory. Young did not wish to give up his position and feared that the approaching army was coming to attack. He therefore declared martial law and sent Utah militias to delay the Expedition. Johnston stationed his army at Camp Scott near Fort Bridger, which was destroyed by the militias to slow their approach. Buchanan offered a deal that would pardon all Utahns for their “seditions and treasons” if they let the army into Salt Lake City and welcomed Cumming as governor. Coupled with negotiations from Thomas L. Kane, Young allowed the new governor and his entourage into the city on June 26, 1858. Cumming's governorship was met with apprehension within the territory as he was a non-Mormon and was replacing the popular Brigham Young.

Accompanied by his wife, Elizabeth Randall Cumming, he was escorted to Utah by a large force under Colonel Albert Sidney Johnston. Upon arrival, Cumming was reappointed to a full term as governor. On orders of Brigham Young, Salt Lake City was almost abandoned when he arrived. Cumming was determined to avoid violence, and the so-called Utah War was quickly settled. Cumming's concerns as governor included the unusual powers of the local probate courts, Indians, construction of roads and bridges, the sale of public lands, mail service, lawlessness (including cattle rustling and murder), and poor penal conditions. Additionally, Cumming's wife shared the difficult winter near Fort Bridger and with her husband occupied the Devereaux House during the three years of their stay in Utah. Her letters provide a rare insight into events of that time, and record her impressions of the Utah landscape and social life as well as politics among the federal appointees, especially during 1857 and 1858.

At the end of his four-year term, Cumming returned to Washington, D.C. He settled the details of his administration and prepared to return to Augusta. However, his return was postponed by the Civil War until the summer of 1864, and not repositioned by president Abraham Lincoln. His wife died in 1867, and Cumming himself died in 1873 at the age of seventy-one. His term as governor of Utah Territory had been one in which the issues of self-determination, shared sovereignty, and territorial/federal relationships were tested as in few other times in the long American effort to create a democratic substitute for centralized colonial rule.

== Personal life ==
Cumming was born in Augusta, Georgia. His wife, Elizabeth Randall Cumming, accompanied him on the Utah Expedition and wrote frequently about the experience. After arriving in Utah, she helped her husband with his official duties and wrote about Utah and its people. She died in 1867.

Elizabeth Wells Randall Cumming (c. 1812-1867), wife of Alfred Cumming, governor of Utah Territory.

Alfred Cumming was the brother of Henry Harford Cumming and the uncle of Alfred Cumming. After his time as governor in the Utah Territory, he travelled to Washington D.C. where he was waylaid until 1864 due to the Civil War. He then returned to the Cumming's family home in Augusta. During his return to Georgia in 1865, Cumming and his wife encountered Alexander H. Stephens while Stephens was being transported under military arrest from Atlanta to Augusta. Elizabeth was moved to tears upon seeing Stephens under arrest and gave him a novel "to read on the way," which he kept as a memento. In August 1865, Cumming visited Stephens twice at Fort Warren in Boston, where Stephens was imprisoned at the time. Cumming first visited Stephens on August 15, briefly meeting with him before promising to return tomorrow. Cumming kept his promise, returning on August 16 with Dr. Willis, and the three spent the day together. Stephens wrote in his diary that he was "truly glad to see both." Cumming died on October 9, 1873.

Political offices
Preceded by Brigham Young	Governor of Utah Territory; 1858–1861	Succeeded by John W. Dawson
