= List of United States representatives in the 13th Congress =

This is a complete list of United States representatives during the 13th United States Congress listed by seniority. For the most part, representatives are ranked by the beginning of their terms in office.

As an historical article, the districts and party affiliations listed reflect those during the 13th Congress (March 4, 1813 – March 3, 1815). Seats and party affiliations on similar lists for other congresses will be different for certain members.

This article describes the criteria for seniority in the House of Representatives and sets out the list of members by seniority. It is prepared on the basis of the interpretation of seniority applied to the House of Representatives in the current congress. In the absence of information to the contrary, it is presumed that the twenty-first-century practice is identical to the seniority customs used during the 13th Congress.

== House seniority ==
Seniority in the House, for representatives with unbroken service, depends on the date on which the members first term began. That date is either the start of the Congress (4 March in odd numbered years, for the era up to and including the 73rd Congress starting in 1933) or the date of a special election during the Congress. Since many members start serving on the same day as others, ranking between them is based on alphabetical order by the last name of the representative.

Representatives in early congresses were often elected after the legal start of the Congress. Such representatives are attributed with unbroken seniority, from the legal start of the congressional term, if they were the first person elected to a seat in a Congress. The date of the election is indicated in a note.

The seniority date is normally taken from the members entry in the Biographical Directory of the United States Congress, except where the date given is the legal start of the Congress and the actual election (for someone who was not the first person elected to the seat in that Congress) was later. The date of election is taken from United States Congressional Elections 1788–1997. In a few instances the latter work provides dates, for the start and end of terms, which correct those in the Biographical Directory.

The Biographical Directory normally uses the date of a special election, as the seniority date. However, mostly in early congresses, the date of the member taking his seat can be the one given. The date of the special election is mentioned in a note to the list below, when that date is not used as the seniority date by the Biographical Directory.

Representatives who returned to the House, after having previously served, are credited with service equal to one less than the total number of terms they served. When a representative has served a prior term of less than two terms (i.e. prior term minus one equals less than one), he is ranked above all others whose service begins on the same day.

== Leadership ==
In this Congress the only formal leader was the speaker of the House. A speakership ballot was held on May 24, 1813, and Henry Clay (DR-KY) was re-elected for a second consecutive term.

Candidate	Ballot
Henry Clay (DR-KY)	89
Timothy Pitkin (F-CT)	54
scattering	5

Speaker Clay resigned on January 19, 1814. On the same day the House held a ballot, which resulted in the election of Langdon Cheves (DR-SC) as the new speaker.

Candidate	Ballot
Langdon Cheves (DR-SC)	94
Felix Grundy (DR-TN)	59
scattering	12

The title Dean of the House (sometimes known, in the nineteenth century, as Father of the House) was held by the member with the longest continuous service. It was not a leadership position.

== Standing committees ==
The House created its first standing committee, on April 13, 1789. There were nine standing committees, listed in the rules initially used by the 13th Congress. Three additional committees were added during the Congress.

Committees, in this period, were appointed for a session at a time by the speaker.

This list refers to the standing committees of the House in the 13th Congress, the year of establishment as a standing committee, the number of members assigned to the committee and the dates of appointment in each session, the end of the session and its chairman. Chairmen, who were re-appointed after serving in the previous Congress, are indicated by an *.

The first session was May 24, 1813 – August 2, 1813 (71 days), the second session was December 6, 1813 – April 8, 1814 (134 days) and the third session was September 19, 1814 – March 3, 1815 (166 days).

No.	Committee	From	Members	Appointed	Chairman
1	Accounts	1805	3	May 26, 1813 – August 2, 1813	Israel Pickens (DR-NC)
1	Accounts	1805	3	December 7, 1813 – April 8, 1814	Nicholas R. Moore (DR-MD)
1	Accounts	1805	3	September 21, 1814 – March 3, 1815	John Kershaw (DR-SC)
2	Claims	1794	7	May 26, 1813 – August 2, 1813	Stevenson Archer (DR-MD)
2	Claims	1794	7	December 7, 1813 – April 8, 1814	Stevenson Archer (DR-MD)
2	Claims	1794	7	September 21, 1814 – March 3, 1815	Bartlett Yancey (DR-NC)
3	Commerce and Manufactures	1795	7	May 26, 1813 – August 2, 1813	*Thomas Newton, Jr. (DR-VA)
3	Commerce and Manufactures	1795	7	December 7, 1813 – April 8, 1814	*Thomas Newton, Jr. (DR-VA)
3	Commerce and Manufactures	1795	7	September 21, 1814 – March 3, 1815	*Thomas Newton, Jr. (DR-VA)
4	District of Columbia	1808	7	May 26, 1813 – August 2, 1813	John Dawson (DR-VA)
4	District of Columbia	1808	7	December 7, 1813 – April 8, 1814	Joseph Kent (DR-MD)
4	District of Columbia	1808	7	September 21, 1814 – March 3, 1815	Joseph Kent (DR-MD)
5	Elections	1789	7	May 26, 1813 – August 2, 1813	James Fisk (DR-VT)
5	Elections	1789	7	December 9, 1813 – April 8, 1814	James Fisk (DR-VT)
5	Elections	1789	7	September 21, 1814 – March 3, 1815	James Fisk (DR-VT)
6	Judiciary	1813	7	December 7, 1813 – April 8, 1814	Charles J. Ingersoll (DR-PA)
6	Judiciary	1813	7	September 21, 1814 – March 3, 1815	Charles J. Ingersoll (DR-PA)
7	Pensions and Revolutionary Claims	1813	7	23 December 1813 – April 8, 1814	Samuel D. Ingham (DR-PA)
7	Pensions and Revolutionary Claims	1813	7	September 21, 1814 – March 3, 1815	John J. Chappell (DR-SC)
8	Post Office and Post Roads	1808	7	May 26, 1813 – August 2, 1813	*John Rhea (DR-TN)
8	Post Office and Post Roads	1808	7	December 7, 1813 – April 8, 1814	*John Rhea (DR-TN)
8	Post Office and Post Roads	1808	7	September 21, 1814 – March 3, 1815	*John Rhea (DR-TN)
9	Public Expenditures	1814	7	26 February 1814 – April 8, 1814	James Pleasants (DR-VA)
9	Public Expenditures	1814	7	September 21, 1814 – March 3, 1815	Nathaniel Macon (DR-NC)
10	Public Lands	1805	7	May 26, 1813 – August 2, 1813	Samuel McKee (DR-KY)
10	Public Lands	1805	7	December 7, 1813 – April 8, 1814	Samuel McKee (DR-KY)
10	Public Lands	1805	7	September 21, 1814 – March 3, 1815	Samuel McKee (DR-KY)
11	Revisal and Unfinished Business	1795	3	May 26, 1813 – August 2, 1813	Willis Alston (DR-NC)
11	Revisal and Unfinished Business	1795	3	December 7, 1813 – April 8, 1814	Lewis Condict (DR-NJ)
11	Revisal and Unfinished Business	1795	3	September 21, 1814 – March 3, 1815	Richard Stanford (DR-NC)
12	Ways and Means	1802	7	May 26, 1813 – August 2, 1813	John W. Eppes (DR-VA)
12	Ways and Means	1802	7	December 7, 1813 – April 8, 1814	John W. Eppes (DR-VA)
12	Ways and Means	1802	7	September 21, 1814 – March 3, 1815	John W. Eppes (DR-VA)

== List of representatives by seniority ==
A numerical rank is assigned to each of the 182 members initially elected to the 13th Congress. Other members, who were not the first person elected to a seat but who joined the House during the Congress, are not assigned a number.

Seven representatives-elect were not sworn in, as five died and two resigned. The list below includes the representatives-elect (with name in italics), with the seniority they would have held if sworn in.

Party designations used in this article are DR for Democratic-Republican members and F for Federalist representatives. Designations used for service in the first three congresses are (A) for Anti-Administration members and (P) for Pro-Administration representatives.

U.S. House seniority
Rank	Representative	Party	District	Seniority date	Notes
Twelve consecutive terms
1	Nathaniel Macon	DR	NC-6	March 4, 1791	(A) 1791–95. Elected to this Congress: May 1, 1813. Dean of the House. Chairman: Public Expenditures (1814–15).
Ten non-consecutive terms
2	William Findley	DR	PA-11	March 4, 1803	Previously served (A) 1791–95 and (DR) 1795–99 while as a member of the House.
Nine consecutive terms
3	John Dawson	DR	VA-11	March 4, 1797	Elected to this Congress: April 1813. Chairman: District of Columbia (1813). Died on March 31, 1814, while still serving as a member of the House.
4	Richard Stanford	DR	NC-8	March 4, 1797	Elected to this Congress: May 1, 1813. Chairman: Revisal and Unfinished Business (1814–15).
5	Robert Brown	DR	PA-6	December 4, 1798	Last term while serving as a member of the House.
Nine non-consecutive terms
6	John Clopton	DR	VA-23	March 4, 1801	Previously served (DR) 1795–99 while as a member of the House. Elected to this Congress: April 1813.
7	John Smilie	DR	PA-13	March 4, 1799	Previously served (A) 1793–95 while as a member of the House. Died as Representative-elect: December 30, 1812.
Eight consecutive terms
8	Willis Alston	DR	NC-2	March 4, 1799	Elected to this Congress: May 1, 1813. Chairman: Revisal and Unfinished Business (1813). Last term while as a member of the House until 19th Congress.
9	John Davenport	F	CT-al	March 4, 1799	
Eight non-consecutive terms
10	David Bard	DR	PA-9	March 4, 1803	Previously served (DR) 1795–99 while as a member of the House.
Seven consecutive terms
11	Thomas Newton, Jr.	DR	VA-21	March 4, 1801	Elected to this Congress: April 1813. Chairman: Commerce and Manufactures.
12	John Smith	DR	VA-3	March 4, 1801	Elected to this Congress: April 1813. Last term while serving as a member of the House.
13	Benjamin Tallmadge	F	CT-al	September 21, 1801	
Six consecutive terms
14	Peterson Goodwyn	DR	VA-19	March 4, 1803	Elected to this Congress: April 1813
15	Joseph Lewis, Jr.	F	VA-8	March 4, 1803	Elected to this Congress: April 1813
16	John Rhea	DR	TN-1	March 4, 1803	Elected to this Congress: April 1–2, 1813. Chairman: Post Office and Post Roads. Last term while serving as a member of the House until 15th Congress.
17	Samuel Taggart	F	MA-6	March 4, 1803	
Five consecutive terms
18	William Ely	F	MA-5	March 4, 1805	Last term while serving as a member of the House until 15th Congress.
19	Charles Goldsborough	F	MD-8	March 4, 1805	
20	Jonathan O. Moseley	F	CT-al	March 4, 1805	
21	Timothy Pitkin	F	CT-al	September 16, 1805	
22	Lewis B. Sturges	F	CT-al	September 16, 1805	
23	Robert Whitehill	DR	PA-5	November 7, 1805	Died as Representative-elect: April 8, 1813
24	William A. Burwell	DR	VA-14	December 1, 1806	Elected to this Congress: April 1813
25	William W. Bibb	DR	GA-al	January 26, 1807	Resigned, to become US Senator: November 6, 1813
Five non-consecutive terms
26	John W. Eppes	DR	VA-16	March 4, 1813	Previously served (DR) 1803–11 while as a member of the House. Elected to this Congress: April 1813. Chairman: Ways and Means. Last term while serving as a member of the House.
27	Nicholas R. Moore	DR	MD-5	March 4, 1813	Previously served (DR) 1803–11. Chairman: Accounts (1813–14). Last term while serving as a member of the House (elected to 14th Congress but did not serve).
28	John G. Jackson	DR	VA-1	March 4, 1813	Previously served (DR) 1803 – September 28, 1810, while as a member of the House. Elected to this Congress: April 1813.
Four consecutive terms
29	Epaphroditus Champion	F	CT-al	March 4, 1807	
30	Joseph Desha	DR	KY-4	March 4, 1807	
31	Meshack Franklin	DR	NC-13	March 4, 1807	Last term while serving as a member of the House
32	Richard M. Johnson	DR	KY-3	March 4, 1807	
33	George M. Troup	DR	GA-al	March 4, 1807	Last term while serving as a member of the House.
34	Thomas Gholson, Jr.	DR	VA-18	November 7, 1808	Elected to this Congress: April 1813
35	Richard Jackson, Jr.	F	RI-al	November 11, 1808	Last term while serving as a member of the House.
Four non-consecutive terms
36	James Fisk	DR	VT-al	March 4, 1811	Previously served (DR) 1805–09 while as a member of the House. Chairman: Elections. Last term while serving as a member of the House.
37	Elisha R. Potter	F	RI-al	March 4, 1809	Previously served (F) November 15, 1796–97. Last term while serving as a member of the House.
Three consecutive terms
38	William Anderson	DR	PA-1	March 4, 1809	Last term while serving as a member of the House until 15th Congress
39	James Breckinridge	F	VA-5	March 4, 1809	Elected to this Congress: April 1813
40	William Crawford	DR	PA-5	March 4, 1809	
41	Jacob Hufty	F	NJ-3	March 4, 1809	(DR) 1809–13. Died on May 20, 1814, while still serving as a member of the House.
42	Aaron Lyle	DR	PA-12	March 4, 1809	
43	Samuel McKee	DR	KY-7	March 4, 1809	Chairman: Public Lands
44	Alexander McKim	DR	MD-5	March 4, 1809	Last term while serving as a member of the House.
45	Joseph Pearson	F	NC-10	March 4, 1809	Elected to this Congress: May 1, 1813. Last term while serving as a member of the House.
46	John Roane	DR	VA-12	March 4, 1809	Elected to this Congress: April 1813. Last term while serving as a member of the House until 20th Congress.
47	Ebenezer Sage	DR	NY-1	March 4, 1809	Last term while serving as a member of the House (as did not qualify in 16th Congress)
48	Daniel Sheffey	F	VA-6	March 4, 1809	Elected to this Congress: April 1813
49	Laban Wheaton	F	MA-9	March 4, 1809	
50	Adam Seybert	DR	PA-1	October 10, 1809	Last term while serving as a member of the House until 15th Congress
51	Abijah Bigelow	F	MA-11	October 8, 1810	Last term while serving as a member of the House.
52	Samuel Ringgold	DR	MD-4	October 15, 1810	Last term while serving as a member of the House until 15th Congress
53	Robert Wright	DR	MD-7	November 29, 1810	
54	Langdon Cheves	DR	SC-1	December 31, 1810	Speaker of the House (1814–15). Last term while serving as a member of the House.
Three non-consecutive terms
55	Egbert Benson	F	NY-2	March 4, 1813	Previously served (P) 1789-93 while serving as a member of the House. Resigned while still serving as a member of the House: August 2, 1813.
56	James Schureman	F	NJ-2	March 4, 1813	Previously served (P) 1789-91 and (F) 1797–99 while as a member of the House. Last term while still serving as a member of the House.
57	John Sevier	DR	TN-2	March 4, 1811	Previously served (NC-P) June 16, 1790–91 while as a member of the House. Elected to this Congress: April 1–2, 1813.
58	Elias Earle	DR	SC-7	March 4, 1811	Previously served September 27, 1806–07. Last term while serving as a member of the House until 15th Congress.
59	John Culpepper	F	NC-7	March 4, 1813	Previously served (F) 1807 – January 2, 1808, and February 23, 1808–09 while as a member of the House. Elected to this Congress: May 1, 1813.
Two consecutive terms
60	Daniel Avery	DR	NY-20	March 4, 1811	Last term while serving as a member of the House until seated in 14th Congress
61	Elijah Brigham	F	MA-10	March 4, 1811	
62	John C. Calhoun	DR	SC-6	March 4, 1811	
63	Henry Clay	DR	KY-2	March 4, 1811	Speaker of the House (1813–14). Resigned while still serving as a member of the House: January 19, 1814. Last term while serving as a member of the House until 14th Congress.
64	Lewis Condict	DR	NJ-1	March 4, 1811	Chairman: Revisal and Unfinished Business (1813–14)
65	Roger Davis	DR	PA-2	March 4, 1811	Last term while serving as a member of the House.
66	Felix Grundy	DR	TN-5	March 4, 1811	Elected to this Congress: April 1–2, 1813. Resigned while serving as a member of the House: July 1814.
67	Bolling Hall	DR	GA-al	March 4, 1811	
68	Aylett Hawes	DR	VA-10	March 4, 1811	Elected to this Congress: April 1813
69	John M. Hyneman	DR	PA-7	March 4, 1811	Resigned while serving as a member of the House: August 2, 1813
70	Joseph Kent	DR	MD-2	March 4, 1811	Chairman: District of Columbia (1813–15). Last term while serving as a member of the House until 16th Congress.
71	William R. King	DR	NC-5	March 4, 1811	
72	Abner Lacock	DR	PA-15	March 4, 1811	Resigned, as Representative-elect: March 3, 1813, to become US Senator.
73	Lyman Law	F	CT-al	March 4, 1811	
74	William Lowndes	DR	SC-2	March 4, 1811	
75	William McCoy	DR	VA-4	March 4, 1811	Elected to this Congress: April 1813
76	Hugh Nelson	DR	VA-22	March 4, 1811	Elected to this Congress: April 1813
77	Israel Pickens	DR	NC-12	March 4, 1811	Elected to this Congress: May 1, 1813. Chairman: Accounts (1813).
78	William Piper	DR	PA-8	March 4, 1811	
79	James Pleasants	DR	VA-17	March 4, 1811	Elected to this Congress: April 1813. Chairman: Public Expenditures (1814).
80	William Reed	F	MA-2	March 4, 1811	Last term while serving as a member of the House.
81	Henry M. Ridgely	F	DE-al	March 4, 1811	Last term while serving as a member of the House.
82	Jonathan Roberts	DR	PA-2	March 4, 1811	Resigned to become US Senator: February 24, 1814
83	William Strong	DR	VT-al	March 4, 1811	Last term while serving as a member of the House until 16th Congress
84	Philip Stuart	F	MD-1	March 4, 1811	
85	Stevenson Archer	DR	MD-6	October 26, 1811	Chairman: Claims (1813–14)
86	William M. Richardson	DR	MA-4	November 4, 1811	Resigned while serving as a member of the House: April 18, 1814
87	Thomas B. Robertson	DR	LA-al	April 30, 1812	
88	John P. Hungerford	DR	VA-9	March 4, 1813	Previously served (DR) March 4 – November 29, 1811, while as a member of the House. Elected to this Congress: April 1813.
89	William Barnett	DR	GA-al	October 5, 1812	Last term while serving as a member of the House.
90	Thomas P. Grosvenor	F	NY-5	January 29, 1813	
91	William Kennedy	DR	NC-3	January 30, 1813	Previously served (DR) 1803–05 while as a member of the House. Elected to this Congress: May 1, 1813. Last term while serving as a member of the House.
Two non-consecutive terms
92	Jonathan Fisk	DR	NY-6	March 4, 1813	Previously served (DR) 1809–11 while as a member of the House.
93	William Hale	F	NH-al	March 4, 1813	Previously served (F) 1809–11 while as a member of the House.
94	William Baylies	F	MA-7	March 4, 1813	Previously served (F) March 4 – June 28, 1809, while as a member of the House.
One term
95	John Alexander	DR	OH-2	March 4, 1813	
96	Thomas M. Bayly	F	VA-13	March 4, 1813	Elected to this Congress: April 1813. Only term while serving as a member of the House.
97	John H. Bowen	DR	TN-4	March 4, 1813	Elected to this Congress: April 1–2, 1813. Only term while serving as a member of the House.
98	Alexander Boyd	F	NY-13	March 4, 1813	Only term while serving as a member of the House.
99	George Bradbury	F	MA-15	March 4, 1813	
100	William C. Bradley	DR	VT-al	March 4, 1813	Only term while serving as a member of the House until 18th Congress
101	Ezra Butler	DR	VT-al	March 4, 1813	Only term while serving as a member of the House.
102	James Caldwell	DR	OH-4	March 4, 1813	
103	Hugh Caperton	F	VA-7	March 4, 1813	Elected to this Congress: April 1813. Only term while serving as a member of the House.
104	John J. Chappell	DR	SC-4	March 4, 1813	Chairman: Pensions and Revolutionary Claims (1814–15)
105	Bradbury Cilley	F	NH-al	March 4, 1813	
106	James Clark	DR	KY-1	March 4, 1813	
107	Oliver C. Comstock	DR	NY-20	March 4, 1813	
108	John Conard	DR	PA-1	March 4, 1813	Only term while serving as a member of the House.
109	Thomas Cooper	F	DE-al	March 4, 1813	
110	William Coxe, Jr.	F	NJ-3	March 4, 1813	Only term while serving as a member of the House.
111	Samuel Davis	F	MA-16	March 4, 1813	Only term while serving as a member of the House.
112	Peter Denoyelles	DR	NY-3	March 4, 1813	Only term while serving as a member of the House.
113	Daniel Dewey	F	MA-12	March 4, 1813	Resigned while still serving as a member of the House: February 24, 1814
114	William Dowse	F	NY-15	March 4, 1813	Died, as Representative-elect: February 18, 1813
115	William P. Duval	DR	KY-10	March 4, 1813	Only term while serving as a member of the House.
116	John S. Edwards	F	OH-6	March 4, 1813	Died, as Representative-elect: February 22, 1813
117	David R. Evans	DR	SC-5	March 4, 1813	Only term while serving as a member of the House.
118	Samuel Farrow	DR	SC-8	March 4, 1813	Only term while serving as a member of the House.
119	Peter Forney	DR	NC-11	March 4, 1813	Elected to this Congress: May 1, 1813. Only term while serving as a member of the House.
120	John Forsyth	DR	GA-al	March 4, 1813	
121	William Gaston	F	NC-4	March 4, 1813	Elected to this Congress: May 1, 1813
122	James Geddes	F	NY-19	March 4, 1813	Only term while serving as a member of the House.
123	Hugh Glasgow	DR	PA-4	March 4, 1813	
124	John Gloninger	F	PA-3	March 4, 1813	Resigned while still serving as a member of the House: August 2, 1813
125	Theodore Gourdin	DR	SC-3	March 4, 1813	Only term while serving as a member of the House.
126	Alexander C. Hanson	F	MD-3	March 4, 1813	
127	Thomas K. Harris	DR	TN-3	March 4, 1813	Elected to this Congress: April 1–2, 1813. Only term while serving as a member of the House.
128	Abraham J. Hasbrouck	DR	NY-7	March 4, 1813	Only term while serving as a member of the House.
129	Samuel Hopkins	DR	KY-5	March 4, 1813	Only term while serving as a member of the House.
130	Samuel M. Hopkins	F	NY-21	March 4, 1813	Only term while serving as a member of the House.
131	Nathaniel W. Howell	F	NY-21	March 4, 1813	Only term while serving as a member of the House.
132	Levi Hubbard	DR	MA-20	March 4, 1813	Only term while serving as a member of the House.
133	Parry W. Humphreys	DR	TN-6	March 4, 1813	Elected to this Congress: April 1–2, 1813. Only term while serving as a member of the House.
134	Charles J. Ingersoll	DR	PA-1	March 4, 1813	Chairman: Judiciary. Only term while serving as a member of the House until 27th Congress.
135	Samuel D. Ingham	DR	PA-6	March 4, 1813	Chairman: Pensions and Revolutionary Claims (1813–14)
136	Jared Irwin	DR	PA-10	March 4, 1813	
137	James Johnson	DR	VA-20	March 4, 1813	Elected to this Congress: April 1813
138	Moss Kent	F	NY-18	March 4, 1813	
139	John Kerr	DR	VA-15	March 4, 1813	Elected to this Congress: April 1813. Only term while serving as a member of the House until 14th Congress.
140	John Kershaw	DR	SC-9	March 4, 1813	Only term while serving as a member of the House.
141	James Kilbourne	DR	OH-5	March 4, 1813	
142	Cyrus King	F	MA-14	March 4, 1813	
143	John Lefferts	DR	NY-1	March 4, 1813	Only term while serving as a member of the House.
144	John Lovett	F	NY-9	March 4, 1813	
145	Jacob Markell	F	NY-14	March 4, 1813	Only term while serving as a member of the House.
146	Duncan McArthur	DR	OH-3	March 4, 1813	Resigned, as Representative-elect: April 5, 1813. Only term until 18th Congress.
147	John McLean	DR	OH-1	March 4, 1813	
148	Morris S. Miller	F	NY-16	March 4, 1813	Only term while serving as a member of the House.
149	Hosea Moffitt	F	NY-10	March 4, 1813	
150	Thomas Montgomery	DR	KY-9	March 4, 1813	Only term while serving as a member of the House until 16th Congress
151	William H. Murfree	DR	NC-1	March 4, 1813	Elected to this Congress: May 1, 1813
152	Thomas J. Oakley	F	NY-4	March 4, 1813	Only term while serving as a member of the House until 20th Congress
153	James Parker	DR	MA-19	March 4, 1813	Only term while serving as a member of the House until 16th Congress
154	Timothy Pickering	F	MA-3	March 4, 1813	
155	Jotham Post, Jr.	F	NY-2	March 4, 1813	Only term while serving as a member of the House
156	John Reed, Jr.	F	MA-8	March 4, 1813	
157	Charles Rich	DR	VT-al	March 4, 1813	Only term while serving as a member of the House until 15th Congress
158	Nathaniel Ruggles	F	MA-13	March 4, 1813	
159	Solomon P. Sharp	DR	KY-6	March 4, 1813	
160	Samuel Sherwood	F	NY-8	March 4, 1813	Only term while serving as a member of the House
161	Zebulon R. Shipherd	F	NY-12	March 4, 1813	Only term while serving as a member of the House
162	John Simpson	DR	KY-8	March 4, 1813	Died, as Representative-elect: January 22, 1813
163	Richard Skinner	DR	VT-al	March 4, 1813	Only term while still serving in the House.
164	Isaac Smith	DR	PA-10	March 4, 1813	Only term while still serving in the House.
165	Samuel Smith	F	NH-al	March 4, 1813	Only term while still serving in the House.
166	William S. Smith	F	NY-17	March 4, 1813	Only term while serving as a member of the House (elected to 14th Congress but did not qualify)
167	Richard Stockton	F	NJ-2	March 4, 1813	Only term while serving as a member of the House.
168	Adamson Tannehill	DR	PA-14	March 4, 1813	Only term while serving as a member of the House.
169	John W. Taylor	DR	NY-11	March 4, 1813	
170	Thomas Telfair	DR	GA-al	March 4, 1813	
171	Joel Thompson	F	NY-15	March 4, 1813	Only term while serving as a member of the House
172	Roger Vose	F	NH-al	March 4, 1813	
173	Artemas Ward, Jr.	F	MA-1	March 4, 1813	
174	Thomas Ward	DR	NJ-1	March 4, 1813	
175	Daniel Webster	F	NH-al	March 4, 1813	
176	Francis White	F	VA-2	March 4, 1813	Elected to this Congress: April 1813. Only term while serving as a member of the House.
177	James Whitehill	DR	PA-3	March 4, 1813	Resigned while still serving as a member of the House: September 1, 1814
178	Jeduthun Wilcox	F	NH-al	March 4, 1813	
179	John Wilson	F	MA-18	March 4, 1813	Only term while serving as a member of the House until 15th Congress
180	Elisha I. Winter	F	NY-12	March 4, 1813	Only term while serving as a member of the House
181	Abiel Wood	DR	MA-17	March 4, 1813	Only term while serving as a member of the House
182	Bartlett Yancey	DR	NC-9	March 4, 1813	Elected to this Congress: May 1, 1813. Chairman: Claims (1814–15).
Members joining the House, after the start of the Congress
...	Reasin Beall	DR	OH-6	April 20, 1813	Special election. Resigned: June 7, 1814.
...	Stephen Ormsby	DR	KY-8	April 20, 1813	Previously served (DR) 1811–13. Special election: April 29, 1813.
...	William Creighton, Jr.	DR	OH-3	May 4, 1813	Special election: May 10, 1813
...	Thomas Wilson	DR	PA-15	May 4, 1813	Special election
...	John Rea	DR	PA-5	May 11, 1813	Previously served (DR) 1803–11 while as a member of the House. Special election. Last term while serving as a member of the House.
...	Isaac Griffin	DR	PA-13	May 24, 1813	Special election: February 16, 1813
...	John M. Bowers	F	NY-15	May 26, 1813	Special election: April 27–29, 1813. Unseated after election contest: December 20, 1813.
...	Edward Crouch	DR	PA-3	October 12, 1813	Special election. Only term.
...	Daniel Udree	DR	PA-7	October 12, 1813	Special election. Only term until 16th Congress.
...	Alfred Cuthbert	DR	GA-al	December 13, 1813	Special election
...	Isaac Williams, Jr.	DR	NY-15	December 20, 1813	Seated after election contest. Only term while as a member of the House until 15th Congress.
...	William Irving	DR	NY-2	January 22, 1814	Special election: December 28–30, 1813
...	Joseph H. Hawkins	DR	KY-2	March 29, 1814	Special election: February 28, 1814. Only term while serving as a member of the House.
...	Newton Cannon	DR	TN-5	September 16, 1814	Special election: September 15–16, 1814
...	Samuel Dana	DR	MA-4	September 22, 1814	Special election: May 23, 1814. Only term while serving as a member of the House.
...	Philip P. Barbour	DR	VA-11	September 19, 1814	Special election: June 1814
...	John W. Hulbert	F	MA-12	September 26, 1814	Special election: August 4, 1814
...	David Clendenin	DR	OH-6	October 11, 1814	Special election
...	Samuel Henderson	F	PA-2	October 11, 1814	Special election. Only term while serving as a member of the House.
...	Amos Slaymaker	F	PA-3	October 11, 1814	Special election. Only term while serving as a member of the House.
...	Thomas Bines	DR	NJ-3	November 2, 1814	Special election: October 10–11, 1814. Only term while serving in the House.
Non voting members
a	Jonathan Jennings	-	IN-al	November 27, 1809	Delegate from Indiana Territory
b	Edward Hempstead	-	MO-al	November 9, 1812	Delegate from Missouri Territory until September 17, 1814
c	Shadrack Bond	-	IL-al	December 3, 1812	Delegate from Illinois Territory until August 2, 1813
d	William Lattimore	-	MS-al	March 4, 1813	Delegate from Mississippi Territory. Formerly served 1803–07.
e	Rufus Easton	-	MO-al	September 17, 1814	Delegate from Missouri Territory
f	Benjamin Stephenson	-	IL-al	November 4, 1814	Delegate from Illinois Territory

== See also ==
- 13th United States Congress
- List of United States congressional districts
- List of United States senators in the 13th Congress
