= 1812 United States House of Representatives elections in Pennsylvania =

United States House of Representatives elections in Pennsylvania, 1812
- October 13, 1812

All 23 Pennsylvania seats to the United States House of Representatives
	Majority party	Minority party
Party	Democratic-Republican	Federalist
Last election	17	1
Seats won	22	1
Seat change	▲5	Steady

Elections to the United States House of Representatives were held in Pennsylvania on October 13, 1812, for the 13th Congress.

== Background ==
In the previous election, 17 Democratic-Republicans and 1 Federalist had been elected to represent Pennsylvania.

== Congressional districts ==
Pennsylvania was divided at this time into 15 districts, 9 of which were single-member districts, five of which had two members, and one of which had four members. Following the 1810 census, Pennsylvania underwent redistricting. Most of the new districts had little correspondence to the former districts, for example, the old 3rd district was divided between the new 2nd, 3rd, and 7th districts. The 1st, 9th and 10th districts were unaltered, except for renumbering of the old 9th and 10th to 13th and 12th respectively, and the addition of a 4th seat to the 1st district.

- The 1st district (4 seats) consisted of Delaware and Philadelphia Counties (including the City of Philadelphia)
- The 2nd district (2 seats) consisted of Chester and Montgomery Counties
- The 3rd district (2 seats) consisted of Dauphin and Lancaster County, Pennsylvania
- The 4th district consisted of York County
- The 5th district (2 seats) consisted of Adams, Cumberland and Franklin Counties
- The 6th district (2 seats) consisted of Bucks, Lehigh, Northampton, and Wayne Counties
- The 7th district consisted of Berks and Schuylkill Counties
- The 8th district consisted of Bedford, Cambria, and Franklin Counties
- The 9th district consisted of Centre, Clearfield, Huntingdon, McKean, and Mifflin Counties
- The 10th district (2 seats) consisted of Bradford, Luzerne, Lycoming, Northumberland, Potter, Susquehanna, and Tioga Counties
- The 11th district consisted of Armstrong, Indiana, Jefferson, and Westmoreland Counties
- The 12th district consisted of Washington County
- The 13th district consisted of Fayette and Greene Counties
- The 14th district consisted of Allegheny and Butler Counties
- The 15th district consisted of Beaver, Crawford, Erie, Mercer, Venango and Warren Counties

== Election results ==
Sixteen incumbents (all Democratic-Republicans) ran for re-election, of whom 14 were re-elected. The incumbents James Milnor (F) of the 1st district and Joseph Lefever (DR) of the old 3rd district did not run for re-election. The two incumbents who lost re-election lost to members of the same party, while six of the seven open seats were won by Democratic-Republicans, a net increase of 5 seats for the Democratic-Republicans and no change for the Federalists.

1812 United States House election results
District	Democratic-Republican			Federalist			Unknown		
1st 4 seats	Adam Seybert (I)	7,712	13.7%	Joseph Hopkinson	6,421	11.4%			
1st 4 seats	William Anderson (I)	7,697	13.7%	Joseph S. Lewis	6,420	11.4%			
1st 4 seats	Charles J. Ingersoll	7,685	13.6%	Samuel Harvey	6,415	11.4%			
1st 4 seats	John Conard	7,637	13.5%	William Pennock	6,393	11.3%			
2nd 2 seats	Roger Davis (I)	5,815	26.2%	Samuel Henderson	5,298	23.8%			
2nd 2 seats	Jonathan Roberts (I)	5,810	26.1%	Francis Gardner	5,295	23.8%			
3rd 2 seats	James Whitehill	5,320	27.6%	John Gloninger	5,030	26.1%			
3rd 2 seats	Jacob Bucher	4,608	23.9%	Amos Slaymaker	4,329	22.4%			
4th	Hugh Glasgow	2,098	58.6%	Jacob Eichelberger	1,484	41.4%			
5th 2 seats	Robert Whitehill (I)	4,864	27.5%	Edward Crawford	4,054	22.9%			
5th 2 seats	William Crawford (I)	4,767	26.9%	James Duncan	4,012	22.7%			
6th 2 seats	Robert Brown (I)	5,949	30.5%	William Rodman (I)	3,744	19.2%			
6th 2 seats	Samuel D. Ingham	5,938	30.4%	William Lattimore	3,575	18.3%			
6th 2 seats				Samuel Sitgreaves	328	1.7%			
7th	John M. Hyneman (I)	2,652	59.4%	Daniel Rose	1,810	40.6%			
8th	William Piper (I)	2,033	63.5%	Samuel Riddle	1,171	36.%			
9th	David Bard (I)	3,779	76.0%	John Blair	1,191	24.0%			
10th 2 seats	Jared Irwin	3,526	23.4%	Nathan Beach	1,303	8.6%			
10th 2 seats	Isaac Smith	3,346	22.2%	Enoch Smith	1,301	8.6%			
10th 2 seats	George Smith (I)	2,831	18.8%						
10th 2 seats	Daniel Montgomery	2,765	18.3%						
11th	William Findley (I)	2,024	55.3%	Thomas Pollock	1,636	44.7%			
12th	Aaron Lyle (I)	2,410	73.5%	Joseph Pentecost	823	25.1%			
12th	Thomas L. Burch	48	1.5%						
13th	John Smilie (I)	1,550	60.4%	Thomas Meason	1,017	39.6%			
14th	Adamson Tannehill	1,419	48.0%	John Woods	1,162	39.3%	John Wilson	374	12.7%
15th	Abner Lacock	2,167	62.8%	Roger Alden	855	24.8%			
15th	Robert Moore	427	12.4%						

== Special elections ==
=== Special elections for the first session ===
Three of the re-elected Representatives did not serve in the 13th Congress, two of whom did not finish their term in the 12th Congress either. John Smilie (DR), re-elected to the 13th district, died on December 30, 1812, and Abner Lacock (DR), re-elected to the 15th district, resigned February 24, 1813, after being elected to the Senate. Smilie was replaced by Isaac Griffin in a special election held February 16, 1813. The only record of that election is a manuscript which indicates he won by a 779-vote majority, but does not record the name(s) of his opponent(s) nor the total number of votes cast. Robert Whitehill (DR) of the 5th district died April 8, 1813. The election in the 5th district was held May 11, 1813, and in the 15th on May 4, 1813

May, 1813 Special election results
District	Democratic-Republican			Federalist			Unknown		
5th	John Rea	2,534	55.7%	Edward Crawford	2,011	44.3%			
15th	Thomas Wilson	690	78.9%				Robert Morse	80	9.1%
15th	Patrick Farrelly	70	8.0%				Others	35	4.0%

Neither seat changed political parties, and both took their seats at the beginning of the 1st session of the 13th Congress, which lasted May 24 - August 2, 1813

=== Special elections for the 2nd session ===
John Gloninger (F) of the 3rd district and John M. Hyneman (DR) of the 7th district both resigned August 2, 1813, at the end of the 1st session. They were replaced in special elections held on October 12, 1813

October 12, 1813, special election results
District	Democratic-Republican			Federalist			Unknown		
3rd	Edward Crouch	4,550	62.0%	William Wallace	2,790	38.0%			
5th	Daniel Udree	2,016	61.4%	David Hottenstein	825	25.1%	David Kirby	445	13.5%

Both took their seats December 6, 1813, at the start of the 2nd session. With Crouch's victory in the 3rd district, the sole Federalist-held seat in Pennsylvania changed to Democratic-Republican control, thus Pennsylvania's delegation was completely Democratic-Republican during the 2nd session, which lasted December 6, 1813 - April 18, 1814

=== Special elections for the third session ===
Jonathan Roberts (DR) of the 2nd district resigned February 24, 1814, upon being elected to the Senate and James Whitehill (DR) of the 3rd district resigned September 1, 1814. Both were replaced in a special election held October 11, 1814, the same day as the 1814 congressional elections.

1814 Special election results
District	Democratic-Republican			Federalist		
2nd	John Hahn	4,702	49.6%	Samuel Henderson	4,773	50.4%
3rd	John Whiteside	2,428	44.1%	Amos Slaymaker	3,078	55.9%

Both seats changed from Democratic-Republican to Federalist control, so that for the 3rd session, Pennsylvania's delegation was 21 Democratic-Republicans and 2 Federalists.
