= 1814 Pennsylvania's 3rd congressional district special election =

A special election was held in Pennsylvania's 3rd congressional district on October 11, 1814 to fill a vacancy caused by the resignation of James Whitehill (DR) on September 1, 1814. This was the second resignation from the 3rd district in the 13th congress, the previous resignation having been in the previous year.

== Election results ==
Candidate	Party	Votes	Percent
Amos Slaymaker	Federalist	3,078	55.9%
John Whiteside	Democratic-Republican	2,428	44.1%

Slaymaker took his seat on December 12, 1814

== See also ==
- List of special elections to the United States House of Representatives
