= 1813 Pennsylvania's 3rd congressional district special election =

On August 2, 1813, Representative John Gloninger (F) of Pennsylvania's 3rd district resigned his seat. A special election to fill this vacancy was held on October 12, 1813. This was the first of two special elections held in the 3rd district in the 13th Congress (the 3rd district was a plural district with two seats).

== Election results ==
Candidate	Party	Votes	Percent
Edward Crouch	Democratic-Republican	4,550	62.0%
William Wallace	Federalist	2,790	38.0%

Crouch took his seat on December 6, 1813. With Gloninger's resignation, Pennsylvania had no Federalist representatives in Congress until the special elections in 1814 in the 2nd and 3rd districts both replaced Democratic-Republicans by Federalists.

== See also ==
- List of special elections to the United States House of Representatives
