= List of United States senators in the 13th Congress =

This is a complete list of United States senators during the 13th United States Congress listed by seniority from March 4, 1813, to March 3, 1815.

Order of service is based on the commencement of the senator's first term. Behind this is former service as a senator (only giving the senator seniority within their new incoming class), service as vice president, a House member, a cabinet secretary, or a governor of a state. The final factor is the population of the senator's state.

The two main parties at this point were the Federalists (F), and Democratic Republicans (DR). At the end of this congress, there was one person elected who was an Anti-Democrat (AD).

== Terms of service ==
Class	Terms of service of senators that expired in years
Class 1	Terms of service of senators that expired in 1815 (CT, DE, MA, MD, NJ, NY, OH, PA, RI, TN, VA, and VT.)
Class 2	Terms of service of senators that expired in 1817 (DE, GA, KY, LA, MA, NC, NH, NJ, RI, SC, and VA.)
Class 3	Terms of service of senators that expired in 1819 (CT, GA, KY, LA, MD, NC, NH, NY, OH, PA, SC, TN, and VT.)

== U.S. Senate seniority list ==
U.S. Senate seniority
Rank	Senator (party-state)	Seniority date	Other factors
1	Joseph Inslee Anderson (DR-TN)	September 26, 1797	
2	Samuel Smith (DR-MD)	March 4, 1803	
3	William Branch Giles (DR-VA)	August 11, 1804	
4	John Gaillard (DR-SC)	December 6, 1804	
5	Nicholas Gilman (DR-NH)	March 4, 1805	Former representative
6	James Turner (DR-NC)	March 4, 1805	
7	Jonathan Robinson (DR-VT)	October 10, 1807	
8	Chauncey Goodrich (F-CT)	October 25, 1807	
9	William Harris Crawford (DR-GA)	November 7, 1807	
10	James Lloyd (F-MA)	June 9, 1808	
11	Michael Leib (DR-PA)	January 9, 1809	
12	Richard Brent (DR-VA)	March 4, 1809	Former representative (6 years)
13	John Lambert (DR-NJ)	March 4, 1809	Former representative (4 years)
14	Obadiah German (DR-NY)	March 4, 1809	
15	John Condit (DR-NJ)	March 21, 1809	
16	Charles Tait (DR-GA)	November 27, 1809	
17	Outerbridge Horsey (F-DE)	January 12, 1810	
18	Charles Cutts (DR-NH)	June 21, 1810	
19	Samuel Whittlesey Dana (F-CT)	December 4, 1810	
20	Thomas Worthington (DR-OH)	December 15, 1810	
21	John Taylor (DR-SC)	December 31, 1810	
22	George Mortimer Bibb (DR-KY)	March 4, 1811	Kentucky 9th in population (1800)
23	Jeremiah Brown Howell (DR-RI)	March 4, 1811	Rhode Island 15th in population (1800)
24	Joseph Bradley Varnum (DR-MA)	June 29, 1811	
25	George Washington Campbell (DR-TN)	October 8, 1811	Former representative
26	William Hunter (F-RI)	October 8, 1811	
27	James Brown (DR-LA)	February 5, 1813	
28	Rufus King (F-NY)	March 4, 1813	Former senator (7 years)
29	David Stone (DR-NC)	March 4, 1813	Former senator (5 years)
30	Jeremiah Morrow (DR-OH)	March 4, 1813	Former representative (10 years)
31	Abner Lacock (DR-PA)	March 4, 1813	Former representative (2 years)
32	Jesse Bledsoe (DR-KY)	March 4, 1813	Kentucky 7th in population (1810)
33	Dudley Chase (DR-VT)	March 4, 1813	Vermont 14th in population (1810)
34	Eligius Fromentin (DR-LA)	March 4, 1813	Louisiana 17th in population (1810)
35	William Bellinger Bulloch (DR-GA)	April 8, 1813	
36	Christopher Gore (F-MA)	May 5, 1813	
37	David Daggett (F-CT)	May 13, 1813	
38	Robert Henry Goldsborough (F-MD)	May 21, 1813	
39	William Hill Wells (F-DE)	May 28, 1813	
40	Jeremiah Mason (F-NH)	June 10, 1813	
41	William Wyatt Bibb (DR-GA)	November 6, 1813	
42	Jonathan Roberts (DR-PA)	February 24, 1814	
43	Jesse Wharton (DR-TN)	March 17, 1814	
45	Thomas Weston Thompson (F-NH)	June 24, 1814	
46	George Walker (DR-KY)	August 30, 1814	
47	Joseph Kerr (DR-OH)	December 10, 1814	
48	William Taylor Barry (DR-KY)	December 16, 1814	
49	Francis Locke, Jr. (DR-NC)	Did not qualify	
50	James Barbour (DR-VA)	January 2, 1815	
51	Isham Talbot (DR-KY)	February 2, 1815	

== See also ==
- 13th United States Congress
- List of United States representatives in the 13th Congress
