= James M. Wallace =

American politician

James M. Wallace (1750 – December 17, 1823) was an American politician who served as a Democratic-Republican member of the U.S. House of Representatives for Pennsylvania's 3rd congressional district from 1815 to 1821.

== Formative years and American Revolution ==
Wallace was born in Hanover Township, Pennsylvania in 1750. He pursued preparatory studies in Philadelphia, and participated in the American Revolutionary War as a member of military units commanded by Captain James Roger, Colonel Timothy Green, and Captain William Brown. By the close of the war, he served as a major of a battalion of Associators.

== Post-war ==
Wallace commanded a company of rangers in defense of the frontier in 1779. He became major of the Dauphin County Militia in 1796.

One of the commissioners of the county from 1799 to 1801, he subsequently served as a member of the Pennsylvania House of Representatives from 1806 to 1810.

Wallace was then elected as a Republican to the Fourteenth Congress to fill the vacancy caused by the declination to serve of Amos Slaymaker. Reelected to the Fifteenth and Sixteenth Congresses, he declined to be a candidate for renomination and retired to his farm.

== Death and interment ==
Wallace died near Hummelstown, Pennsylvania on December 17, 1823, and was interred in the Old Derry Church Graveyard in Derry, Pennsylvania.

== Links ==
- United States Congress. "James M. Wallace (id: W000078)". Biographical Directory of the United States Congress.
- The Political Graveyard

U.S. House of Representatives
| Preceded by Edward Crouch; Amos Slaymaker | Member of the U.S. House of Representatives from Pennsylvania's 3rd congressional district 1815–1821; 1815–1819 alongside: John Whiteside; 1819–1821 alongside: Jacob Hibshman | Succeeded by James Buchanan; John Phillips |
