= John Phillips (Pennsylvania politician) =

American politician

John Phillips was a Federalist member of the U.S. House of Representatives who served Pennsylvania's 3rd congressional district from March 1821 to March 1823.

Philips, who was born in Chester County, served only a single term in the Seventeenth Congress. While it was noted that he had a limited education, there is remarkably little, if any, additional documentation available about him, including the years of his birth and death.

== Sources ==
- United States Congress. "John Phillips (id: P000310)". Biographical Directory of the United States Congress.
- The Political Graveyard

U.S. House of Representatives
Preceded by Jacob Hibshman; James M. Wallace	Member of the U.S. House of Representatives from Pennsylvania's 3rd congressional district 1821–1823 alongside: James Buchanan	Succeeded by Daniel H. Miller
