= Christian Tarr =

American politician

Christian Tarr (May 25, 1765 – February 24, 1833) was a member of the U.S. House of Representatives from Pennsylvania.

Christian Tarr was born in Baltimore, Maryland. He moved to Westmoreland County, Pennsylvania, in 1794 and engaged in agricultural pursuits. He was also engaged in the manufacture of pottery in Fayette County, Pennsylvania.

Tarr was elected as a Republican to the Fifteenth and Sixteenth Congresses. He was a member of the Pennsylvania House of Representatives in 1821 and 1822. He was appointed on October 31, 1827, as superintendent of the road which had been built by the United States Government from Cumberland, Maryland, to Wheeling, Virginia (now West Virginia). He served until March 20, 1829. He died in Washington Township, Fayette County, Pennsylvania, and was interred in the Methodist Graveyard in Brownsville, Pennsylvania.

== Sources ==
- United States Congress. "Christian Tarr (id: T000042)". Biographical Directory of the United States Congress.
- The Political Graveyard

U.S. House of Representatives
Preceded by Isaac Griffin	Member of the U.S. House of Representatives from Pennsylvania's 13th congressional district 1817–1821	Succeeded by Andrew Stewart
