= Peter Hitchcock =

American politician (1781–1853)

Peter Marshall Hitchcock
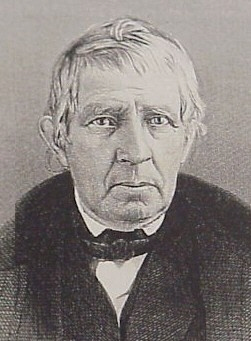

Member of the U.S. House of Representatives from Ohio's 6th district
- In office March 4, 1817 – March 3, 1819
- Preceded by: David Clendenin
- Succeeded by: John Sloane

Member of the Ohio Senate
- In office 1812-1815

Member of the Ohio House of Representatives
- In office 1810

Personal details
- Born: October 19, 1781 Cheshire, Connecticut, U.S.
- Died: March 4, 1853 (aged 71) Painesville, Ohio, U.S.
- Resting place: Welton Cemetery, Burton, Ohio, U.S.
- Party: Democratic-Republican; Whig
- Spouse: Nabbe Cook (m. 1805)
- Children: 10
- Education: Yale University

Peter Marshall Hitchcock (October 19, 1781 – March 4, 1853) was an attorney, teacher, farmer, soldier, legislator, and jurist. His judicial career included 28 years service on the Ohio Supreme Court, 21 years of them as Chief Justice. (Some sources erroneously give his date of death as March 4, 1854.)

== Early life, education and family ==
Peter Hitchcock was born in Cheshire, Connecticut, the youngest son of Valentine Hitchcock (1741–1809) and Sarah Hotchkiss (1743–1802). His father was a tailor and landowner. Peter taught in a district school during the winter and worked on a farm in the summer to earn the money for his education. He entered college in the sophomore year, pursuing classical studies and was graduated from Yale College in 1801. He studied law with Barzillai Slosson (Yale 1791), of Kent, Connecticut, and was admitted to the bar in 1804 and commenced practice in Cheshire. On December 12, 1805 in Cheshire, he married Nabbe Cook (1784–1867) (sometimes written Nabby Cook).

In 1806, they moved to Burton, Ohio, becoming one of the first families to settle in that township of Geauga County, Ohio in the Western Reserve. They had ten children, five sons and five daughters, all born in Ohio. One son and one daughter died in infancy. Two of the sons also were graduated from Yale. Hitchcock spent the early years improving his farm, establishing his law practice and teaching. Peter Hitchcock was the first teacher at Burton Academy, which eventually became a part of Case Western Reserve University.

== Practice of law and early public career ==
After a few years, the population of the county increased sufficiently to provide him an extensive practice. As an advocate, his style of speech was described as colloquial and logical rather than rhetorical, the more common style of the day. He was always accorded the most profound attention when arguing a case, whether to a jury, a Justice of the Peace or before the judges of the highest courts.

Peter Hitchcock was elected a member of the Ohio House of Representatives in 1810 and elected a member of the Ohio Senate in 1812 serving until 1815. He served as speaker (President) of the Senate in 1815. Hitchcock was nominated for United States Senator in the legislative balloting to replace Thomas Worthington in 1814 and then the full term to replace Joseph Kerr in 1815, failing both times to attract sufficient votes.

Peter Hitchcock was commissioned lieutenant colonel of the Fourth Regiment, Ohio State Militia, in 1814 and then commissioned major general, Fourth Division, Ohio State Militia, in 1816.

Peter Hitchcock was elected as a Democratic-Republican from Ohio's 6th congressional district to the Fifteenth United States Congress. He was not a candidate for renomination in 1818.

== Judicial service ==
The legislature appointed Peter Hitchcock a judge of the Supreme Court of Ohio in 1819 for a seven-year term, and reappointed him to a second term in 1826. Prior to 1831, panels of the Supreme Court traveled over the State in circuit, panels simultaneously holding sessions in different counties of the state. After 1831, it became the practice for the Supreme Court of Ohio to sit en banc at the capital. Judge Peter Hitchcock generally traveled the circuit on horseback or his own Yankee wagon. He would reach a county seat by noon or later, and immediately went to the Clerk's office. All the chancery cases and demurrers, or other papers for the Court, would be in his room and usually settled by the time Court opened the next morning.

His method of preparing to hear a case was to determine the primary question in the case, review the law books, but develop his own line of reasoning. In court, he did not refuse to hear argument, but unless it was quite an important case, or he indicated a desire to hear argument, the members of the Bar were apt to submit directly to his examinations. It was rare that the court's business was not completed in a day.

Partisan maneuvering kept Judge Hitchcock off the court in 1833. Instead he ran and was elected to another term in the Ohio Senate, again serving as speaker. Hitchcock was reappointed to another seven-year term on the court in 1835. In 1842, partisanship again took him off the court until 1845 when he was appointed to another seven-year term. He voluntarily retired in 1852 at the end of his fourth term. Of the twenty-eight years he served on the Supreme Court of Ohio, the last twenty-one of them were as chief justice.

Hitchcock was a Presidential elector in 1844 for Clay/Frelinghuysen.

The honorary degree of Doctor of Laws was conferred on him by Marietta College in 1845 and by Western Reserve College in 1849.

== Constitutional convention of 1850 ==
He was elected as a Whig delegate to the Ohio constitutional convention in 1850 called to revise the 1802 constitution. In this capacity he contributed to reorganization of the judicial tribunals of the state, and still continued to discharge his duties on the bench. He was called the "Father of the constitution of 1851."

One of the debates was over granting the power of the veto to the governor. As a good Whig, Judge Peter Hitchcock opposed it:

It seems to me that the idea of giving to the governor a veto is inconsistent with our professions. It looks as though we distrusted the capabilities of the people for self-government. In fact, it is based upon the assumption that the people are incapable of self government. It implies also another fact, that we distrust our own qualifications to elect such men to do the business of the state as are worthy of being trusted. We are afraid to trust the legislative department of the government and therefore we put it under the care of the governor. ... They say the governor is the representative of the whole people, because the whole people have voted for him. He is the representative of the masses, and therefore he may with propriety interfere with the proceedings of the Legislature. But why not carry the reasoning out? If the governor be the representative of the whole people, and he alone knows the sentiments and wants of the people and can best provide for them, why not dispense with the Legislature and give the governor the power to make the laws?

The convention did not give the governor the veto in the new constitution.

== Retired from public life ==
Peter Hitchcock was the uncle of Seabury Ford, the first Ohio governor from the Western Reserve. Peter Hitchcock died in Painesville, Ohio, while stopped at the home of his eldest son on his way home from Columbus, Ohio to Burton. He was interred in Welton Cemetery, Burton, Ohio.

== Notes ==
Political offices
Preceded by Thomas Kirker	Speaker of the Ohio Senate; 1815-12-04 – 1816-12-01	Succeeded by Abraham Shepherd
Preceded by David T. Disney	Speaker of the Ohio Senate; December 1, 1834 - March 6, 1835	Succeeded by Charles Anthony
Ohio House of Representatives
Preceded by Amos Spofford as Representative from Geauga County	Representative from Geauga and Cuyahoga Counties; 1810–1811	Succeeded by Samuel Huntington as Representative from Geauga, Ashtabula, and Cuyahoga Counties
Ohio Senate
Preceded by David Abbot	Senator from Geauga, Ashtabula, Cuyahoga, and Portage Counties; 1812–1815	Succeeded by Himself as Senator from Geauga, Ashtabula, Cuyahoga, Huron, and Portage Counties
Preceded by Himself as Senator from Geauga, Ashtabula, Cuyahoga, and Portage Counties	Senator from Geauga, Ashtabula, Cuyahoga, Huron, and Portage Counties; 1815–1816	Succeeded by Almon Ruggles; Aaron Wheeler
U.S. House of Representatives
Preceded by David Clendenin	Member of the U.S. House of Representatives from Ohio's 6th congressional district 1817–1819	Succeeded by John Sloane
Legal offices
Preceded by Ethan Allen Brown	Ohio Supreme Court Judges; 1819-1833	Succeeded by Reuben Wood
Preceded by John C. Wright	Ohio Supreme Court Judges; 1835-1842	Succeeded by Matthew Birchard
Preceded by Ebenezer Lane	Ohio Supreme Court Judges; 1845-1852	Succeeded by Allen G. Thurman
