= William Logan (politician) =

American politician

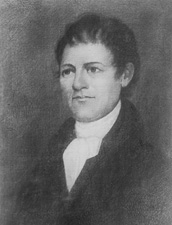

United States Senator from Kentucky
- In office March 4, 1819 – May 28, 1820
- Preceded by: Isham Talbot
- Succeeded by: Isham Talbot

7th Speaker of the Kentucky House of Representatives
- In office 1808–1810
- Preceded by: Henry Clay
- Succeeded by: John Simpson

5th Speaker of the Kentucky House of Representatives
- In office 1803–1807
- Preceded by: John Adair
- Succeeded by: Henry Clay

Member of the Kentucky House of Representatives
- In office 1803–1806; 1808

Personal details
- Born: December 8, 1776 Harrodsburg, Kentucky
- Died: August 8, 1822 (aged 45) Shelby County, Kentucky
- Party: Democratic-Republican

William Logan (December 8, 1776 – August 8, 1822) was a United States Senator from Kentucky.

Born within the fort at Harrodsburg, Logan spent his early childhood in St. Asaphs Fort, receiving private instruction from his parents and tutors. He moved to Shelby County about 1798. He studied law, was admitted to the bar, and practiced. He was delegate to Kentucky's constitutional convention in 1799 and worked as a state commissioner in siting the new Barren County's seat of government (at Glasgow, a new settlement probably named for the Scottish hometown of Logan's father) the same year.

Logan was a member of the Kentucky House of Representatives from 1803 to 1806 and again in 1808, and served as speaker two terms. He was a judge of the court of appeals from 1808 to 1812. He was also a presidential elector in 1808, 1812, and 1816. Logan was elected as a Democratic Republican to the United States Senate and served from March 4, 1819, to May 28, 1820, when he resigned to run for governor in 1820. (He did not succeed, instead serving as a commissioner of the Kentucky River Company.) Logan died at his residence in Shelby County and was interred in the Logan family burial ground near Shelbyville.

U.S. Senate
Preceded by Isham Talbot	U.S. senator (Class 3) from Kentucky; 1819–1820; Served alongside: Richard M. Johnson	Succeeded by Isham Talbot
