= Jacob Hibshman =

American politician

Member of the U.S. House of Representatives from Pennsylvania's 3rd district
- In office March 4, 1819 – March 3, 1821
- Preceded by: John Whiteside
- Succeeded by: James Buchanan

Associate Judge of the Court of Common Pleas of Lancaster County
- In office January 24, 1811 – December 1819

Personal details
- Born: January 31, 1772 Ephrata, Province of Pennsylvania, British America
- Died: May 19, 1852 (aged 80) Ephrata, Pennsylvania, U.S.
- Party: Democratic-Republican

Jacob Hibshman (January 31, 1772 – May 19, 1852) was a member of the U.S. House of Representatives from Pennsylvania's 3rd congressional district.

== Early life ==
Jacob Hibshman was born on a farm near Ephrata in the Province of Pennsylvania. He attended the common schools and a private school in Harrisburg, Pennsylvania. He engaged in agricultural pursuits, and served as associate judge of Lancaster County, Pennsylvania from 1810 to 1819. In 1817, Hischman and fellow judges of the court Thomas Clark and Walter Franklin were impeached for allegations of corruption and acquitted in an impeachment trial.

== Career ==
Hibshman was elected as a Republican to the Sixteenth Congress. He was an unsuccessful candidate for reelection in 1820 to the Seventeenth Congress.

He was deputy surveyor of Lancaster County for twenty years. He was a justice of the peace and chairman of the board of canal appraisers. He served as major general of the Pennsylvania Militia for twelve years. He organized the Northern Mutual Insurance Co., in 1844 and served as its first president. He died at his residence near Ephrata on May 19, 1852. Interment in the Hibshman Cemetery on the farm near Ephrata.

U.S. House of Representatives
Preceded by John Whiteside; James M. Wallace	Member of the U.S. House of Representatives from Pennsylvania's 4th congressional district 1819–1821 alongside: James M. Wallace	Succeeded by James Buchanan; John Phillips
