= Stephen Ormsby =

American politician (1759–1844)

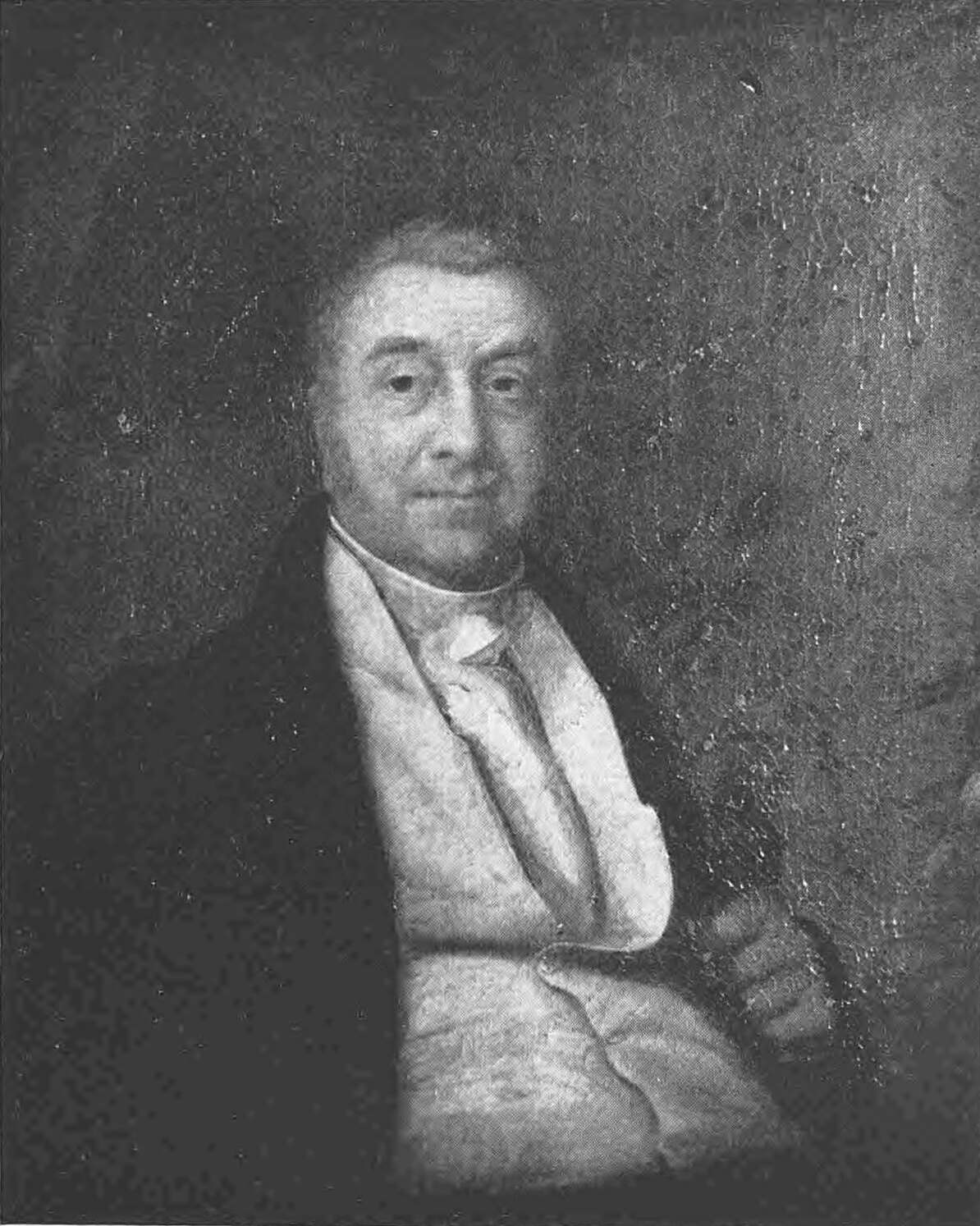
- Born: 1759; County Sligo
- Died: 4 March 1844; Lyndon
- Occupations: Politician, lawyer, judge

Stephen Ormsby (1759 – March 4, 1844) was a U.S. Representative from Kentucky.

He was born in County Sligo, Ireland, immigrated to the Thirteen Colonies when a boy, and settled in Philadelphia, Pennsylvania. He pursued classical studies and studied law.

Ormsby was admitted to the bar in 1786 and commenced the practice of his profession in Danville, Kentucky. He became Deputy Attorney General of Jefferson County, Kentucky in 1787. Ormsby served in the early Indian wars, and as a brigadier general under Gen. Josiah Harmar in the campaign of 1790. He served as judge of the district court of Jefferson County in 1791, as a presidential elector in 1796, and as a judge of the circuit court 1802–1810. He was a U.S. Senate candidate in 1798.

Ormsby was elected as a Democratic-Republican to the Twelfth Congress (March 4, 1811 – March 3, 1813). He was an unsuccessful candidate for reelection to the Thirteenth Congress.

Ormsby was elected to the Thirteenth Congress to fill the vacancy caused by the death of Representative-elect John Simpson. He was then re-elected to the Fourteenth Congress and served from April 20, 1813, to March 3, 1817, but was an unsuccessful candidate for reelection to the Fifteenth Congress.

He was appointed first president of the branch of the Bank of the United States of Louisville, Kentucky, in 1817.

Stephen Ormsby died near Louisville, Kentucky on March 4, 1844. He was interred in the Ormsby Burial Ground (later the property of the Kentucky Military Institute) at Lyndon, near Louisville, Kentucky.

U.S. House of Representatives
Preceded by Henry Crist	Member of the U.S. House of Representatives from Kentucky's 3rd congressional district 1811–1813	Succeeded by Richard M. Johnson
New district	Member of the U.S. House of Representatives from Kentucky's 8th congressional district 1813–1817	Succeeded by Richard C. Anderson, Jr.
