= John Stark Edwards =

American lawyer

John Edwards

Member-elect of the U.S. House of Representatives from Ohio's 6th district
- Died before taking office
- Preceded by: Jeremiah Morrow
- Succeeded by: Reasin Beall

Personal details
- Born: John Stark Edwards; August 23, 1777 New Haven, Connecticut, United States
- Died: February 22, 1813 (aged 35) Huron County, Ohio, U.S.
- Party: Federalist
- Education: Princeton University (BA); Litchfield Law School

John Stark Edwards (August 23, 1777 – February 22, 1813) was an attorney, public official, soldier and landowner in the United States.

== Heritage ==
John S. Edwards was born in New Haven, Connecticut, the son of Pierpont and Frances (Ogden) Edwards. His father gave him the name after his old friend General John Stark, the hero of the Battle of Bennington that occurred shortly before John’s birth. Pierpont Edwards was born in Massachusetts, son of theologian and Princeton president Jonathan Edwards and Sarah Pierpont, was a distinguished lawyer, a member of the Congress of the Confederation, and a founder of the Toleration Party in Connecticut. He owned a 1/20th share of the Western Reserve and was a founder of the Connecticut Land Company. In the division of the Reserve among the members, the township of Mesopotamia in Trumbull County, Ohio was allotted to him.

== Education and early life ==
John S. Edwards graduated at Princeton College in 1796, studied law with his father, attended lectures of Judge Tapping Reeve at the Litchfield Law School, and was admitted to the bar at New Haven in the spring of 1799. He was described by contemporaries as a man over six feet in height, stoutly built, and muscular with a florid complexion and commanding presence. He left New Haven for the Northwest Territory to take charge as sales agent of his father’s lands in the Reserve, arriving at Warren, Ohio in June 1799. John Edwards was accompanied on that journey by John Kinsman (landowner of Kinsman township), Calvin Pease (future judge of the Ohio Supreme Court), Simon Perkins, George Tod (another future Judge of the Ohio Supreme Court), Ebenezer Reeve, Josiah Pelton, Turhand and Jared P. Kirtland (physician, naturalist, malacologist and probate judge), and others.

John Edwards was among the first lawyers who settled in the Reserve. He made a clearing and erected a log house to begin a settlement in Mesopotamia Township, Trumbull County, Ohio, also building the first sawmill there in 1803. He resided there until about 1804, although to give attention to his professional business and official duties he passed a good part of his time in Warren. His name appears in the first case on the docket of the court in Trumbull county, in 1800. He was one of the attorneys who defended Joseph McMahon in a notorious trial over the killing of an Indian. In July 1800, John S. Edwards was commissioned Recorder of Trumbull county by territorial governor Arthur St. Clair. Edwards held that office until his death in 1813. A member of the Trumbull bar since 1800, he was admitted to the bar in Geauga County in 1810.

John S. Edwards was a founder of the Erie Literary Society that established the Burton Academy at Burton, Ohio in 1805. The successors of Burton Academy eventually became part of Western Reserve University. He was a member of the Erie Lodge, Free and Accepted Masons, and later served as its secretary.

On February 28, 1807, John Stark Edwards married Louisa Maria Morris (1787–1866) at Springfield, Vermont. Miss Morris was a daughter of General Lewis and Mary (Dwight) Morris. Her father had been a United States congressman from Vermont and her maternal grandfather was Timothy Dwight, President of Yale College. They became the parents of three children; only William J. Edwards grew to adult years. Louisa Edwards was well-educated and a voracious reader who did not stop with history, poetry, and the weekly news. She read her husband's law library, Blackstone and all. Although her husband held the office, it is said that many of the early records of the Trumbull County Recorder are in Mrs. Edwards' handwriting.

== Rise to Congress and early death ==
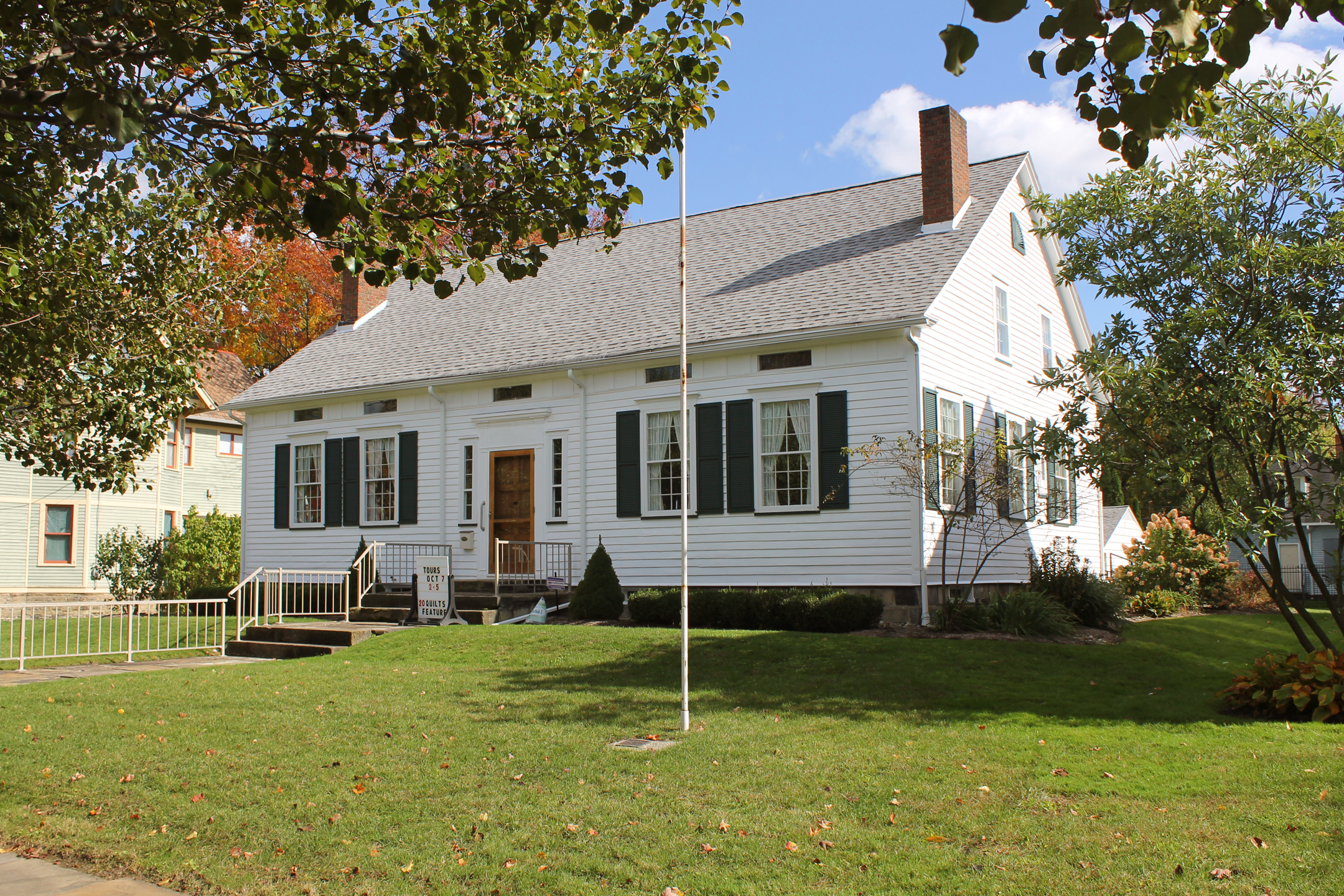
Edwards' house in Warren

In March 1811, he was commissioned colonel of the Second regiment, Third brigade, Fourth division, Ohio militia. At the news of the surrender of General William Hull at Detroit in August 1812, leading citizens put the area in a state of defense, as great alarm existed that the surrender exposed them to incursions by the British and Indians. Edwards marched with a portion of his regiment to Cleveland. After being there for a period, his services as an officer were no longer required and he returned to Warren.

In October of the same year he was elected Representative to the Thirteenth United States Congress from Ohio's 6th congressional district. John S. Edwards was the first man elected to the United States Congress who resided on the Western Reserve, but he did not live to take his seat.

In January 1813, in company with two others, he left Warren with the intention of going to the Danbury peninsula (Marblehead Peninsula) of what was then Huron County to look after his property there. When near Lower Sandusky, a thaw coming on, the companions thought best to return for home. John Edwards got wet, was taken ill with malarial fever on the road, and died in Huron County; his body was brought back to Warren.

In 1814, his widow was married a second time to Robert Montgomery, of Youngstown. They were also the parents of three children: Robert Morris, Caroline Sarah who married Dr. M. Hazeltine, and Ellen Louisa, who was married to Samuel Hine.

Edwards' home still stands in Warren, albeit not in its original location, and is now a museum.

== See also ==
- List of United States representatives-elect who never took their seats

U.S. House of Representatives
Preceded by Jeremiah Morrow	Member-elect of the U.S. House of Representatives from Ohio's 6th congressional district 1812–1813	Succeeded by Reasin Beall
