= John Simpson (Kentucky politician) =

American politician

Member-elect of the U.S. House of Representatives from Kentucky's 8th district
- Died before taking office
- Preceded by: Constituency established
- Succeeded by: Stephen Ormsby

8th Speaker of the Kentucky House of Representatives
- In office December 3, 1810 – December 1812
- Preceded by: William Logan
- Succeeded by: Joseph H. Hawkins

Personal details
- Born: Virginia, British America
- Died: January 22, 1813 River Raisin, Michigan, U.S.
- Resting place: Frankfort Cemetery
- Party: Democratic-Republican
- Height: 6 ft 7 in (201 cm)

Military service
- Allegiance: United States
- Branch/service: United States Army
- Rank: Captain
- Unit: 1st Regiment of Riflemen
- Battles/wars: Northwest Indian War • Battle of Fallen Timbers; War of 1812 • Battle of River Raisin

John Simpson (died January 22, 1813) was a United States Army officer, attorney, and politician. Simpson saw military action in both the Northwest Indian War and the War of 1812. He also served 4 terms in the Kentucky House of Representatives including 2 years as the House's Speaker. In 1812 he was elected to the United States House of Representatives but died before he could take office.

== Early life ==
Simpson was born in Virginia and moved to Kentucky with his family as a child during the 1780s. They settled in Lincoln County and Simpson would attend school in first Danville and then Bardstown.

== Northwest Indian War ==
During the war Simpson volunteered for the Legion of the United States under the command of Gen. Anthony Wayne. He participated in the final skirmish of war; the Battle of Fallen Timbers but did not see battle as he stayed behind to guard supplies.

== Political career ==
After the war Simpson moved to Shelby County, Kentucky where he would study law and become one of Shelby County's first attorneys. He went on to be elected to the Kentucky House of Representatives representing Shelby County. He was elected to 4 consecutive terms from 1806 to 1811. He was elected Speaker of the House from 1810 to 1811; defeating Samuel South and William MacMillan.

In 1812 he was elected to the United States House of Representatives from the newly created 8th District of Kentucky. Although the 8th district had just been formed he defeated incumbent Stephen Ormsby who had been redistricted from the 3rd. He defeated Ormsby by a 'small margin'. Before taking his seat the War of 1812 broke out and Simpson rejoined the army. Ormsby would later win a special election to be his replacement.

== War of 1812 ==
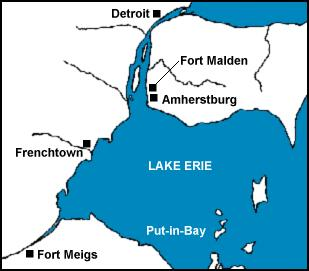
Location of Frenchtown and other settlements near the west coast of Lake Erie during the period.

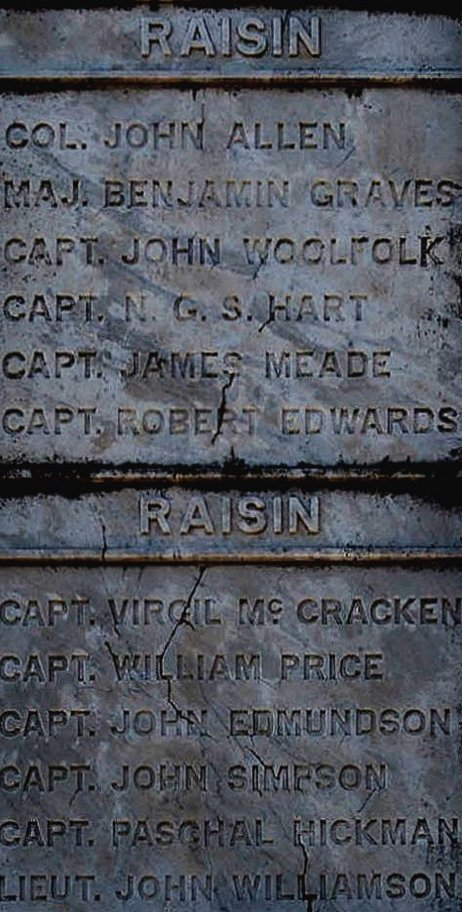
Names of American officers who died at Frenchtown (Kentucky War Memorial Frankfort, KY)

During the War of 1812 Simpson once again volunteered for service. On August 15, 1812 he joined the First Rifle Regiment using his political clout to become the Captain of the regiment's third company. Under the command of Col. John Allen his regiment helped reinforce Gen. Hull in Detroit. He participated in the Battle of River Raisin on January 22, 1813. He joined the battle during a British counterattack while the regular soldiers where retreating to the river. While his company only lost one soldier during its first engagement he was killed early into the retreat. In September 1834 human remains believed to be his were exhumed and returned to Kentucky. However, they have never been positively identified. He is also believed to have been reburied in the Frankfort Cemetery in Frankfort, Kentucky but the exact location is unknown.

== Legacy ==
John Simpson is the namesake of both Simpsonville, Kentucky and Simpson County, Kentucky. Fourth street of Shelbyville, Kentucky was also once named Simpson street in his honor.

== See also ==
- List of United States representatives-elect who never took their seats

Political offices
Preceded by William Logan	Speaker of the Kentucky House of Representatives; 1810–1812	Succeeded by Joseph H. Hawkins
U.S. House of Representatives
New constituency	Member-elect of the U.S. House of Representatives from Kentucky's 8th congressional district 1812–1813	Succeeded by Stephen Ormsby
