= David Clendenin =

American politician

Member of the U.S. House of Representatives from Ohio's 6th district
- In office October 11, 1814 – March 3, 1817
- Preceded by: Reasin Beall
- Succeeded by: Peter Hitchcock

Personal details
- Born: approximately 1773
- Died: March 13, 1843 Baltimore, Maryland, U.S.
- Party: Democratic Republican

David Clendenin was an American investor, soldier and legislator. He represented Ohio in the U.S. House of Representatives from 1814 until 1817.

== Early life and career ==
He moved from Harford County, Maryland, to near Struthers in the Mahoning River Valley of Ohio about 1806, residing in Trumbull County, Ohio. He became an investor with a few others in David Eaton's early iron and steel blast furnaces in Trumbull County, one of the pioneers in the iron and steel industry. The furnaces operated until 1812 when all the men were drafted to serve in the War of 1812. Those furnaces never operated again, although others were established after the war. Clendenin was a small shareholder in the Bank of the Western Reserve, chartered in 1811/2.

David Clendenin served as first lieutenant of Capt. James Hazlep's company of artillery attached to a regiment of the Ohio Militia in the War of 1812 and also as lieutenant paymaster in the Second Regiment, Ohio Militia, from August 26, 1812 – January 19, 1813. He was assistant district paymaster in the United States Army, April 19, 1814 – December 19, 1814 at which time he was mustered out.

== Congress ==
David Clendenin was elected in 1814 to fill the vacancy caused by the resignation of United States Representative Reasin Beall, the first man from the Western Reserve to serve in the United States Congress. Clendenin was elected as a Democratic-Republican from Ohio's 6th congressional district to the Thirteenth United States Congress. He was reelected to the Fourteenth Congress.

== Death ==
Clendedin died in Baltimore, Maryland, on March 23, 1843, at about 70 years of age.

U.S. House of Representatives
Preceded by Reasin Beall	U.S. Representative from Ohio's 6th district 1814–1817	Succeeded by Peter Hitchcock
