= Reasin Beall =

American politician (1767 - 1843)

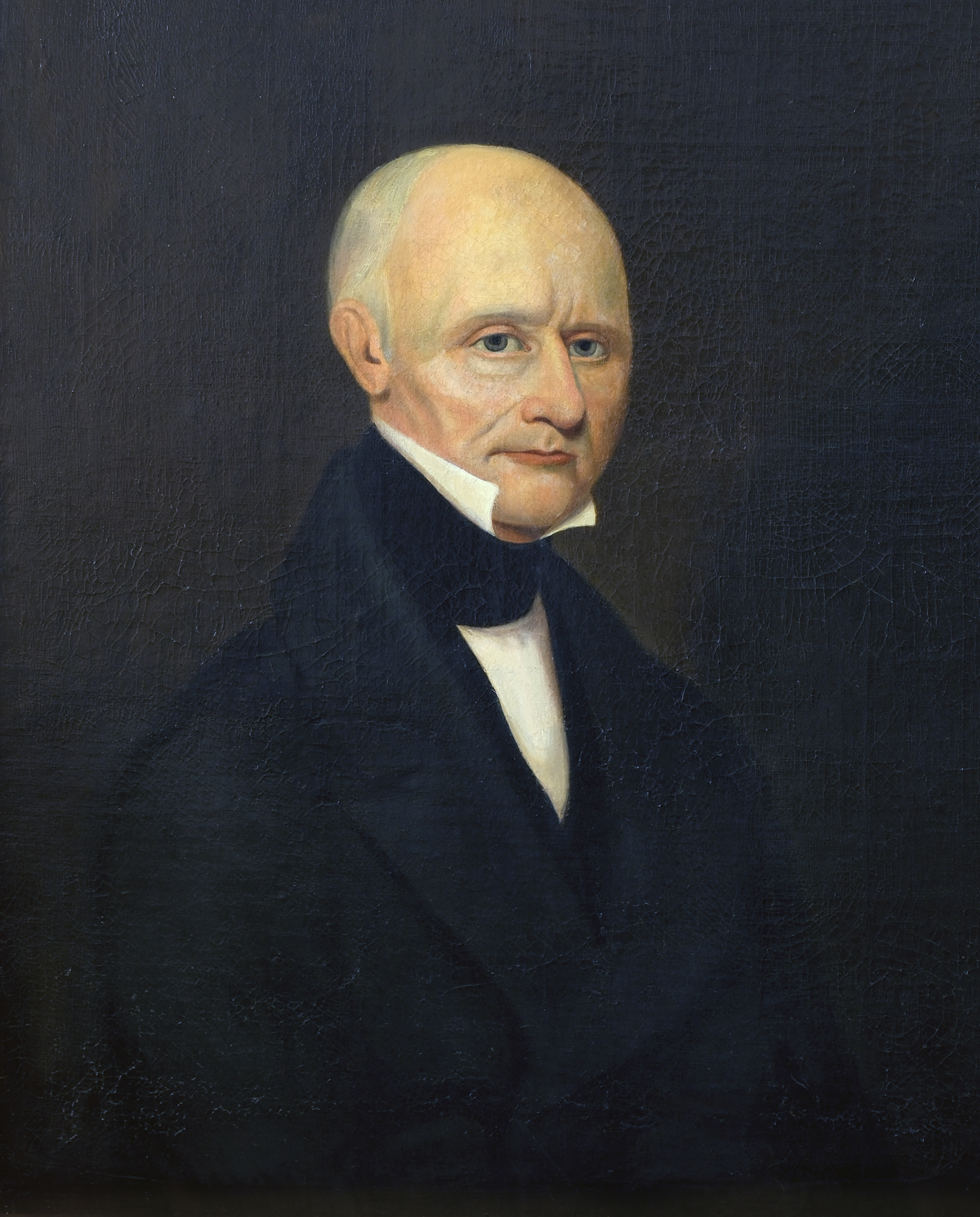
- Collection of Wayne County Historical Society

Member of the U.S. House of Representatives from Ohio's 6th district
- In office April 20, 1813 – June 7, 1814
- Preceded by: John S. Edwards
- Succeeded by: David Clendenin

Personal details
- Born: December 3, 1769 Frederick County, Province of Maryland, British America
- Died: February 20, 1843 (aged 73) Wooster, Ohio, U.S.
- Party: Democratic-Republican; Whig
- Spouse: Rebecca Johnson

Military service
- Allegiance: United States
- Branch/service: United States Army
- Rank: Brigadier General
- Battles/wars: Northwest Indian War; War of 1812

Reasin Beall (December 3, 1769 – February 20, 1843) was an American politician. He was an Ohio congressman and a militia general during the War of 1812.

Beall was born in 1769 in Frederick County in the Province of Maryland (in the portion of which would be later separated as Montgomery County in 1776), and his family moved to Washington County, Pennsylvania during his youth.

He married Rebecca Johnson ca. 1792. In about 1801, he and his family moved to Ohio, settling initially at Steubenville. He later moved from Jefferson County to New Lisbon, in Columbiana County, Ohio.

== Military career ==
In 1790, Beall joined the military and participated in the Northwest Indian War in the Ohio Valley. He was on General Anthony Wayne's staff where he became acquainted with then Captain William Henry Harrison.

In Columbiana County, Ohio, he became a Colonel of the Militia.

During the War of 1812, he served as brigadier general 2d Brigade Ohio Militia. He led several brigades from Eastern Ohio into the area of present Richland County, Ohio. He established one of his headquarters (Camp Christmas) at Wooster, Wayne County, Ohio.

== Political career ==
Beall began his political career as Clerk of the Columbiana County Court.

After the War of 1812, he returned to New Lisbon and served in the Thirteenth United States Congress from April 20, 1813 to June 7, 1814, filling the vacancy of Rep. John S. Edwards, who had been elected but died before taking his seat.

== Later years ==
The office of register of the Federal Land Office in Wooster became vacant in 1814, and Beall was appointed by the President and took up residence there. He held that position until resigning in 1824. He remained in Wooster until his death. He resigned from politics, with the exception of being named a Presidential elector in 1840. He was a Whig Presidential elector in 1840 for Harrison/Tyler.

Reasin Beall died age 73 in Wooster, Ohio.

== Legacy ==
Beall's home in Wooster still stands and at one time was owned by the College of Wooster. The college used it as a woman's dormitory. The home was under the care of William Foard and his wife Winona (Houser) Foard who lived in the upper stories from about 1958 to about 1973. The home is now the center of the [Wayne County Historical Society of Ohio] campus.

U.S. House of Representatives
| Preceded by John S. Edwards (never served) | U.S. Representative from Ohio's 6th district 1813 - 1814 | Succeeded by David Clendenin |
