= Isaac Griffin =

American politician (1756–1827)

Member of the U.S. House of Representatives from Pennsylvania's 13th district
- In office May 24, 1813 – March 3, 1817
- Preceded by: District created
- Succeeded by: Christian Tarr

Member of the Pennsylvania House of Representatives
- In office 1807-1812

Personal details
- Born: February 27, 1756 Kent County, Delaware Colony, British America
- Died: October 12, 1827 (aged 71) Nicholson Township, Pennsylvania, U.S.
- Party: Democratic-Republican

Isaac Griffin (February 27, 1756 – October 12, 1827) was a veteran of the American Revolutionary War and member of the U.S. House of Representatives from Pennsylvania, serving two terms from 1813 to 1817.

== Early life and career ==
Isaac Griffin (great-grandfather of Eugene McLanahan Wilson and great-great-grandfather of Charles Hudson Griffin) was born in Kent County in the Delaware Colony. He moved to Fayette County, Pennsylvania, and was engaged in agricultural pursuits.

=== Revolutionary War ===
He was commissioned a captain during the American Revolutionary War.

== Political career ==
He appointed justice of the peace in 1794 and was elected a member of the Pennsylvania House of Representatives in 1807 and served four terms.

=== Congress ===
Griffin was elected as a Democrat-Republican to the Thirteenth Congress to fill the vacancy caused by the death of John Smilie. He was reelected to the Fourteenth Congress. He was an unsuccessful candidate for reelection in 1816 to the Fifteenth Congress.

== Death ==
He died from the effects of a fall from a wagon, on his estate in Nicholson Township, Pennsylvania, on October 12, 1827. Interment on what was known as the Britt Farm in Nicholson Township.

U.S. House of Representatives
Preceded by District Created	Member of the U.S. House of Representatives from Pennsylvania's 13th congressional district 1813–1817	Succeeded by Christian Tarr
