= Samuel Henderson (Pennsylvania politician) =

American politician

Member of the U.S. House of Representatives from Pennsylvania's 2nd district
- In office October 11, 1814 – March 3, 1815
- Preceded by: See below
- Succeeded by: See below

Personal details
- Born: November 27, 1764 England, Kingdom of Great Britain
- Died: November 17, 1841 (aged 76) Upper Merion, Pennsylvania, U.S.
- Party: Federalist

Samuel Henderson (November 27, 1764 – November 17, 1841) was a member of the U.S. House of Representatives from Pennsylvania.

== Biography ==
Samuel Henderson was born and attended school in England. He immigrated to the United States in 1782 and settled in Montgomery, Pennsylvania. He owned and operated the Henderson Marble Quarries in Montgomery County, Pennsylvania.

Henderson was elected as a Federalist to the Thirteenth Congress to fill the vacancy caused by the resignation of Jonathan Roberts. He died on his estate at Upper Merion, in 1841. Interment in the family burying ground in Montgomery County, Pennsylvania.

== Sources ==
- United States Congress. "Samuel Henderson (id: H000487)". Biographical Directory of the United States Congress.
- The Political Graveyard

U.S. House of Representatives
Preceded by Jonathan Roberts; Roger Davis	Member of the U.S. House of Representatives from Pennsylvania's 2nd congressional district 1814–1815 alongside: Roger Davis	Succeeded by William Darlington; John Hahn
