= Isham Talbot =

American politician (1773–1837)

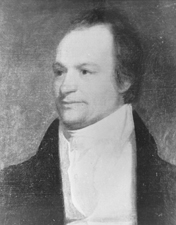

United States Senator from Kentucky
- In office February 2, 1815 – March 4, 1819
- Preceded by: Jesse Bledsoe
- Succeeded by: William Logan
- In office October 19, 1820 – March 4, 1825
- Preceded by: William Logan
- Succeeded by: John Rowan

Member of the Kentucky Senate
- In office 1812–1815

Personal details
- Born: 1773 Bedford County, Virginia
- Died: September 25, 1837 (aged 63–64) Frankfort, Kentucky
- Resting place: Frankfort Cemetery
- Party: Democratic-Republican

Isham Talbot (1773 – September 25, 1837) was a United States Senator from Kentucky.

Born in Bedford County, Virginia, Isham Talbot Jr. moved with his parents, Isham and Elizabeth (Davis) Talbot, to Harrodsburg, Kentucky in about 1784. He was admitted to the bar, and began his legal practice in Versailles, Kentucky. He moved to Frankfort, Kentucky, where he also was a lawyer.

Talbot served in the Kentucky Senate from 1812 to 1815. He was then elected as a Democratic Republican to the United States Senate to fill the vacancy caused by the resignation of Senator Jesse Bledsoe, and served from February 2, 1815, to March 3, 1819. The second time he was elected to the United States Senate was to fill the vacancy caused by the resignation of William Logan, and served from October 19, 1820, to March 3, 1825. He then resumed his law practice and died on his plantation near Frankfort.

Isham Talbot was interred in the State Cemetery in Frankfort.

U.S. Senate
Preceded by Jesse Bledsoe	U.S. senator (Class 3) from Kentucky; February 2, 1815 – March 3, 1819; Served alongside: William T. Barry, Martin D. Hardin, John J. Crittenden	Succeeded by William Logan
Preceded by William Logan	U.S. senator (Class 3) from Kentucky; October 19, 1820 – March 3, 1825; Served alongside: Richard M. Johnson	Succeeded by John Rowan
