= John Whiteside =

American politician

John Whiteside (1773 – July 28, 1830) was a member of the U.S. House of Representatives from Pennsylvania.

John Whiteside was born near Lancaster, Pennsylvania. He attended the common schools and Chestnut Level Academy. He employed on his father's farm, and later engaged in the hotel business and operated a distillery. He was a justice of the peace and a member of the Pennsylvania House of Representatives in 1810 and 1811.

Whiteside was elected as a Republican to the Fourteenth and Fifteenth Congresses. He resumed the hotel business in Lancaster and served as register of wills and again a member of the Pennsylvania House of Representatives in 1825. He died in Lancaster in 1830. Interment in Lancaster Cemetery.

== Sources ==
- United States Congress. "John Whiteside (id: W000412)". Biographical Directory of the United States Congress.
- The Political Graveyard

U.S. House of Representatives
| Preceded by Edward Crouch; Amos Slaymaker | Member of the U.S. House of Representatives from Pennsylvania's 4th congressional district 1815–1819 alongside: James M. Wallace | Succeeded by Jacob Hibshman; James M. Wallace |
