= 13th United States Congress =

1813–1815 meeting of U.S. legislature

←	12th	14th	→
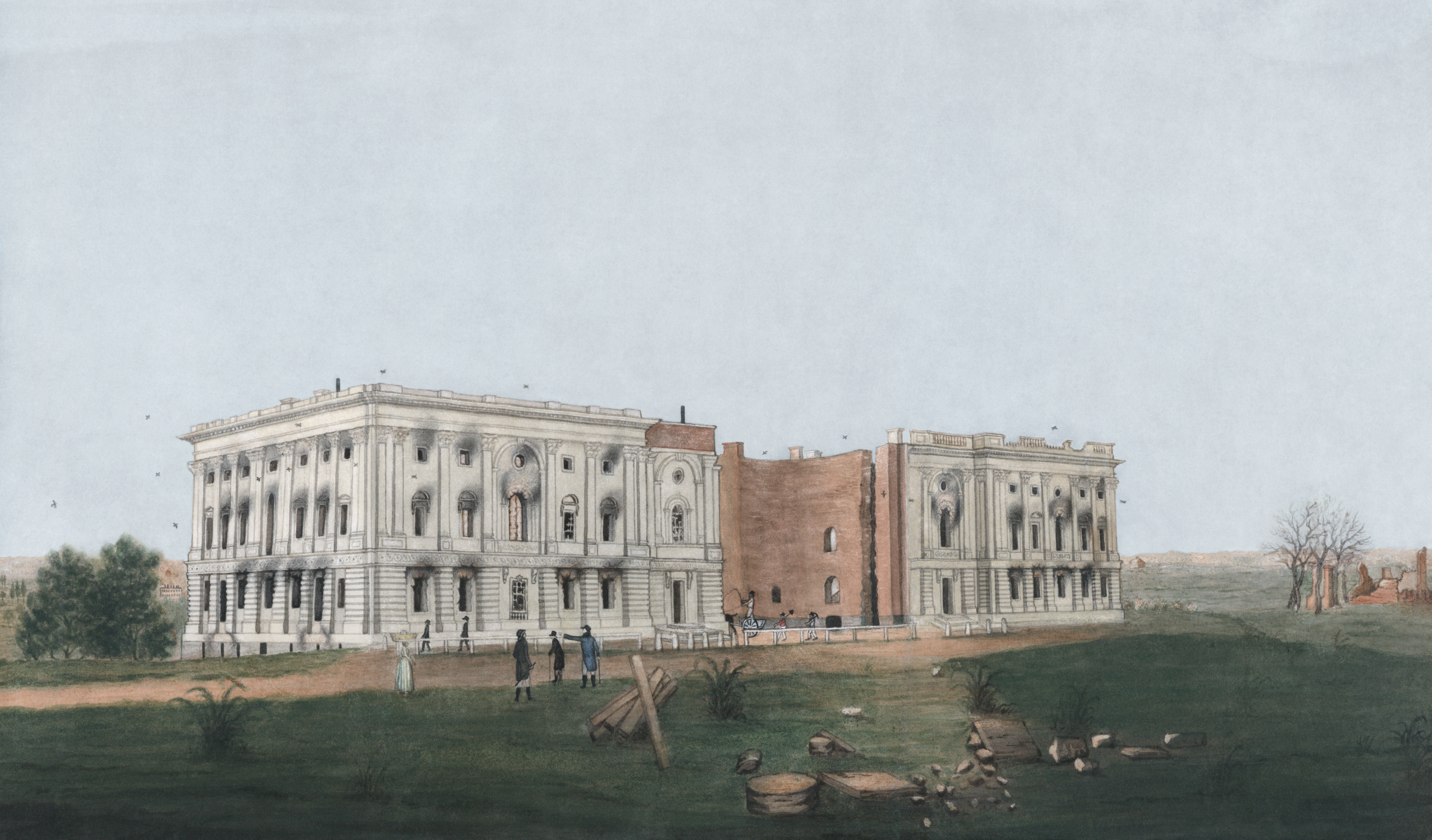
- The Capitol after the August 1814 burning of Washington, D.C., by the British in the War of 1812 (painting 1814 by George Munger)

Overview
- Legislative body: United States Congress
- Jurisdiction: United States
- Term: March 4, 1813 – March 4, 1815

Senate
- Members: 36
- President: Elbridge Gerry (DR) (Note: U.S. Vice President Elbridge Gerry's term as President of the Senate ended on November 23, 1814, when he died in office, President pro tempore John Gaillard acted his duties as the President of the Senate on the last four months of Congress.) (until November 23, 1814); Vacant (from November 23, 1814)
- President pro tempore: William H. Crawford (DR); Joseph Bradley Varnum (DR); John Gaillard (DR)
- Party control: Democratic-Republican

House of Representatives
- Members: 182 representatives 4 non-voting delegates
- Speaker: Henry Clay (DR); Langdon Cheves (DR)
- Party control: Democratic-Republican

Sessions
- 1st: May 24, 1813 – August 2, 1813
- 2nd: December 6, 1813 – April 18, 1814
- 3rd: September 19, 1814 – March 3, 1815

The 13th United States Congress was a meeting of the legislative branch of the United States federal government, consisting of the United States Senate and the United States House of Representatives. It met in Washington, D.C. from March 4, 1813, to March 4, 1815, during the fifth and sixth years of James Madison's presidency. The apportionment of seats in the House of Representatives was based on the 1810 United States census. Both chambers had a Democratic-Republican majority. The first two sessions were held at the Capitol building while the third, convened after the Burning of Washington, took place in the First Patent Building.

Senate President

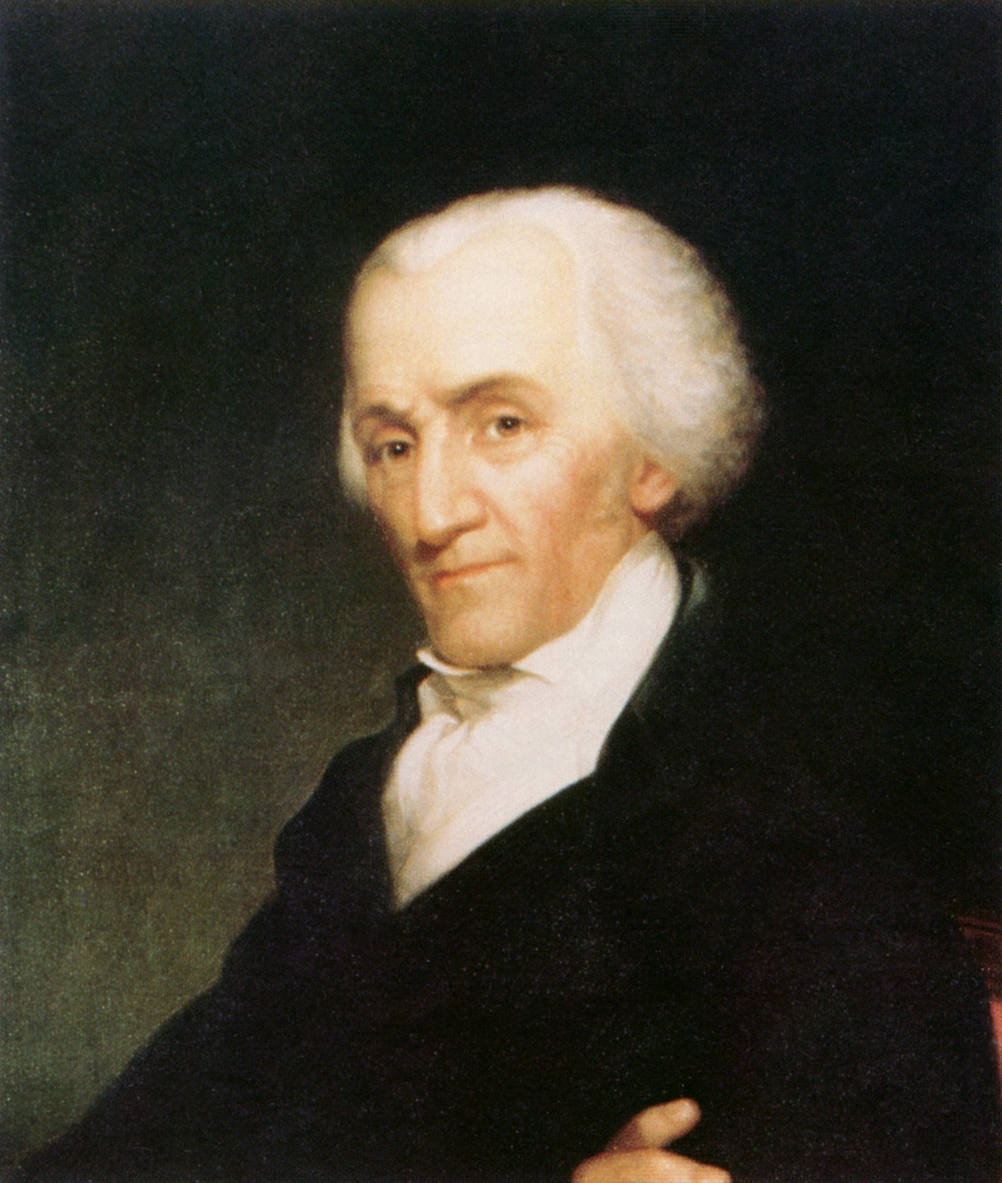
Elbridge Gerry

Senate presidents pro tempore

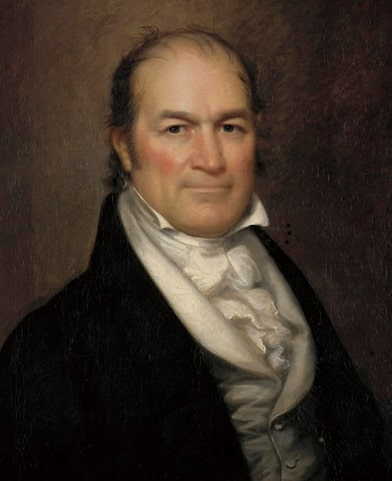
William H. Crawford

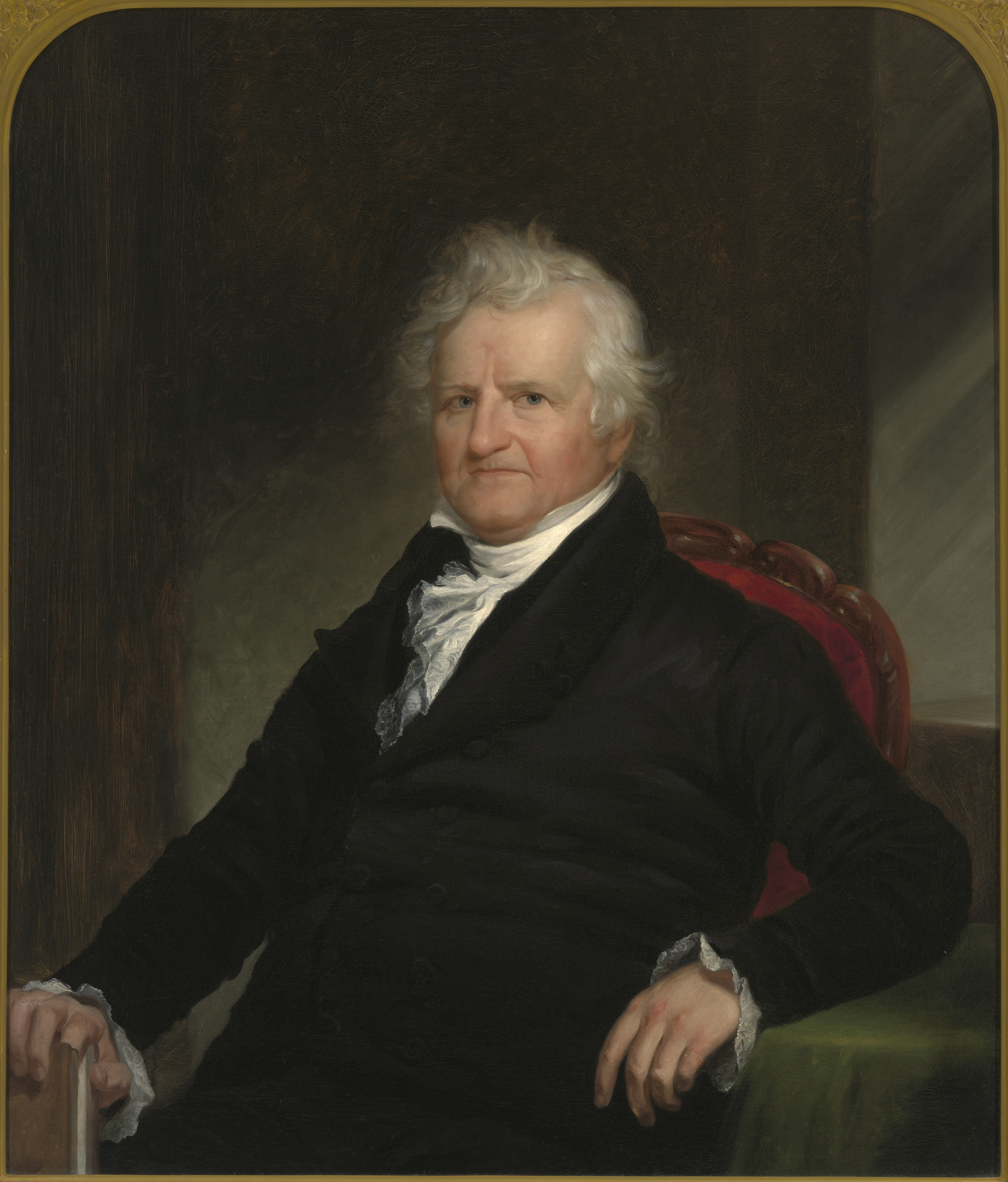
Joseph B. Varnum

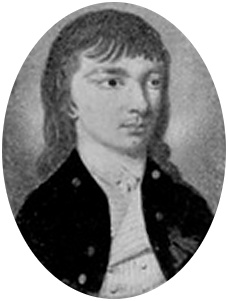
John Gaillard

House speakers

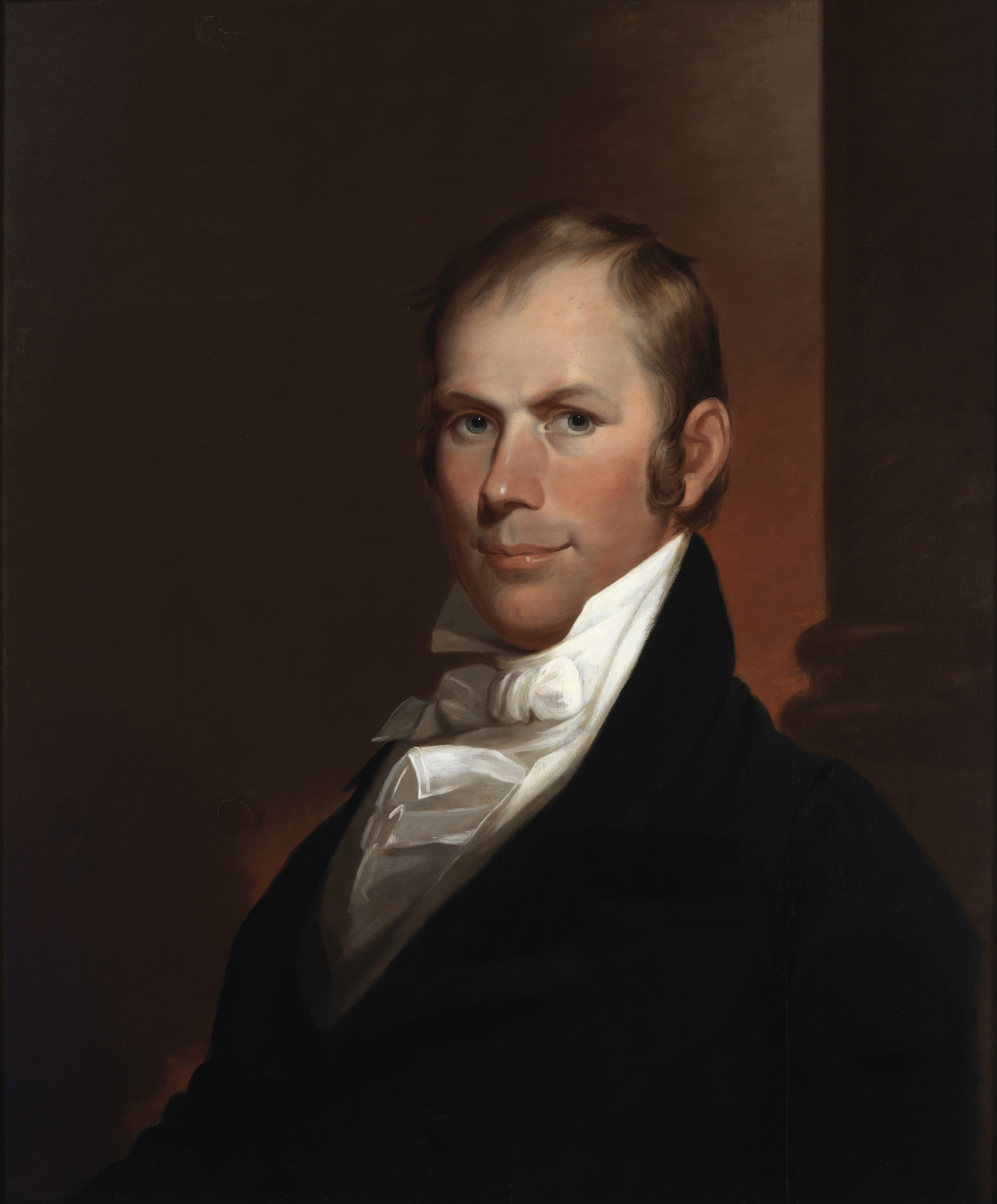
Henry Clay

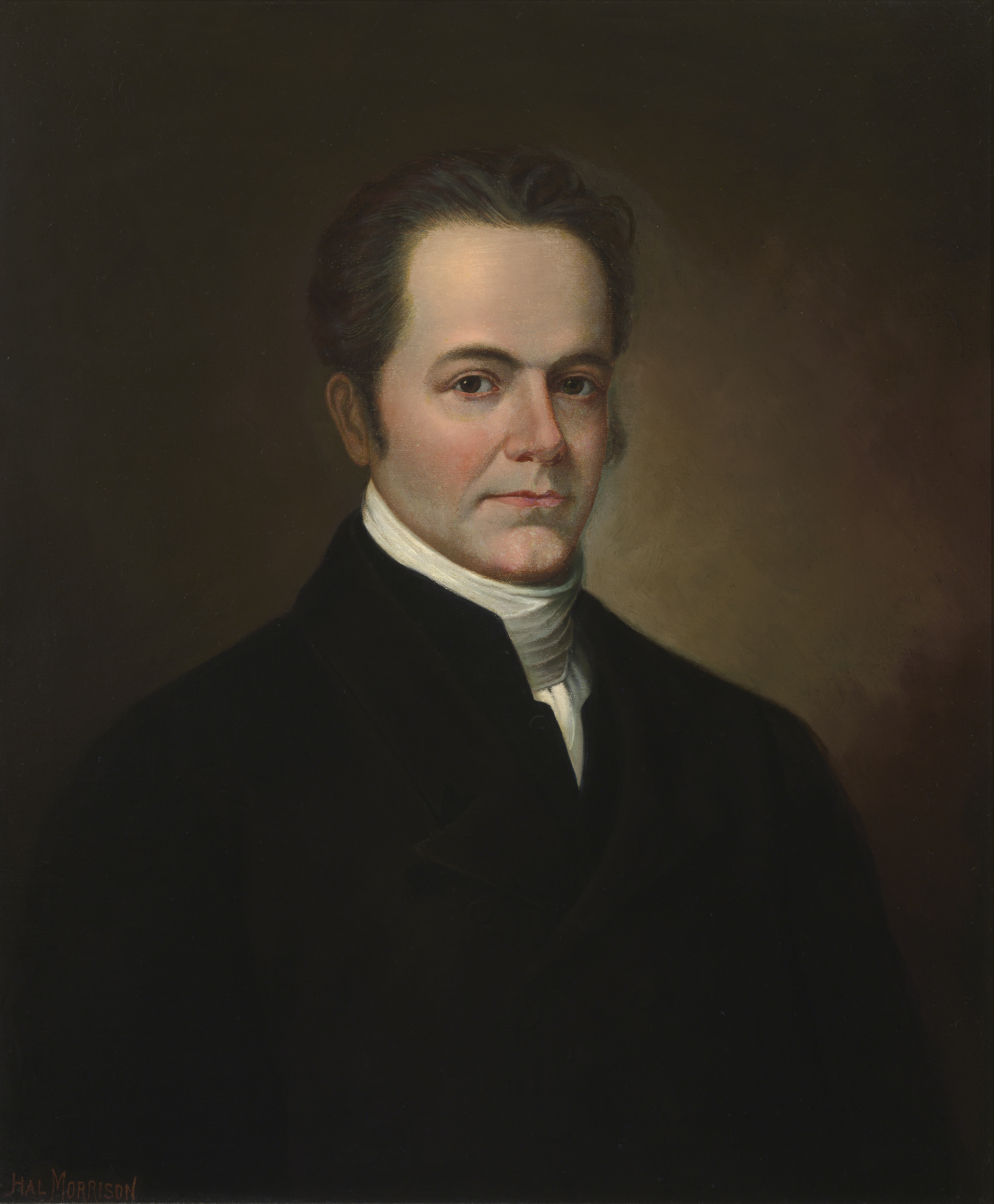
Langdon Cheves

== Major events ==
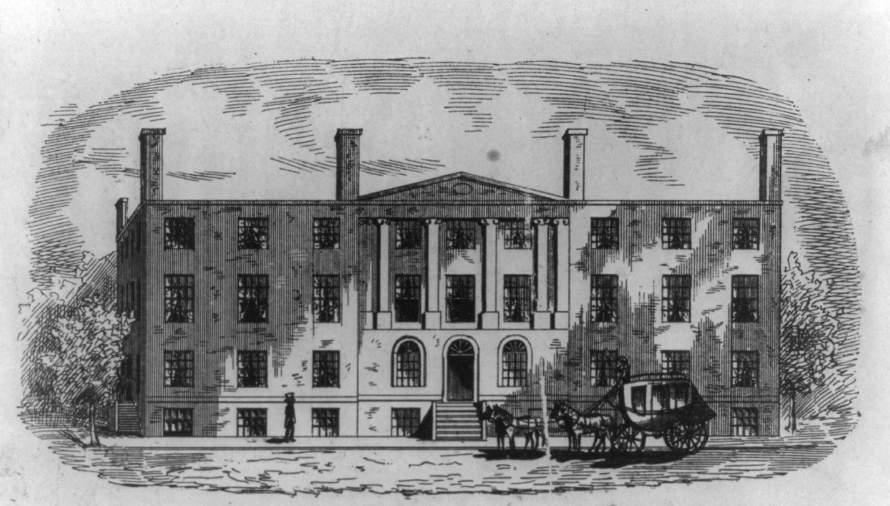
After the Burning of Washington in August 1814, Congress convened its third session in the U.S. Patent Office building, located in Blodget's Hotel.

- September 10, 1813: War of 1812: Battle of Lake Erie
- October 5, 1813: War of 1812: Battle of the Thames
- March 27, 1814: Creek War: Battle of Horseshoe Bend
- July 25, 1814: War of 1812: Battle of Lundy's Lane
- August 25, 1814: War of 1812: Burning of Washington
- September 11, 1814: War of 1812: Battle of Lake Champlain
- September 13, 1814: War of 1812: Bombardment of Fort McHenry at Baltimore
- November 7, 1814: War of 1812: Forces under Gen. Andrew Jackson seized Pensacola
- November 23, 1814: Vice President Elbridge Gerry died
- December 15, 1814: Hartford Convention convened through January 5, 1815, in which New England Federalists met to discuss their grievances concerning the ongoing War of 1812 and the political problems arising from the federal government's increasing power. Despite radical outcries among Federalists for New England secession and a separate peace with Great Britain, moderates outnumbered them and extreme proposals were not a major focus of the debate.
- December 24, 1814: War of 1812: Treaty of Ghent signed
- January 8, 1815: War of 1812: Battle of New Orleans

== Treaties ratified ==
- February 17, 1815: War of 1812: Senate ratified the Treaty of Ghent, 8 Stat. 218

== Party summary ==
The count below identifies party affiliations at the beginning of the first session of this congress. Changes resulting from subsequent replacements are shown below in the "Changes in membership" section.

=== Senate ===
	Party (shading shows control)		Total	Vacant
	Democratic- Republican (DR)	Federalist (F)	Total	Vacant
End of previous congress	30	6	36	0
Begin	27	6	33	3
End	25	10	35	1
Final voting share	71.4%	28.6%		
Beginning of next congress	21	12	33	3

=== House of Representatives ===
Following the 1810 census, the size of the House was increased to 182 seats from 142.

	Party (shading shows control)		Total	Vacant
	Democratic- Republican (DR)	Federalist (F)	Total	Vacant
End of previous congress	105	36	141	1
Begin	108	68	176	6
End	115	67	182	0
Final voting share	63.2%	36.8%		
Beginning of next congress	131	46	177	5

== Leadership ==
=== Senate ===
- President: Elbridge Gerry (DR), until November 23, 1814; thereafter vacant.
- President pro tempore: William H. Crawford (DR), March 4, 1813 – March 23, 1813
  - Joseph Bradley Varnum (DR), December 6, 1813 – February 3, 1814
  - John Gaillard (DR), from November 25, 1814

=== House of Representatives ===
- Speaker: Henry Clay (DR), until January 19, 1814
  - Langdon Cheves, (DR), from January 19, 1814

== Members ==
This list is arranged by chamber, then by state. Senators are listed by class, and representatives are listed by district.

=== Senate ===
Senators were elected by the state legislatures every two years, with one-third beginning new six-year terms with each Congress. Preceding the names in the list below are Senate class numbers, which indicate the cycle of their election. In this Congress, Class 1 meant their term ended with this Congress, requiring reelection in 1814; Class 2 meant their term began in the last Congress, requiring reelection in 1816; and Class 3 meant their term began in this Congress, requiring reelection in 1818.

==== Connecticut ====
▌1. Samuel W. Dana (F)
▌3. Chauncey Goodrich (F), until May 13, 1813

▌David Daggett (F), from May 13, 1813

==== Delaware ====
▌1. Outerbridge Horsey (F)
▌2. William H. Wells (F), from May 28, 1813

==== Georgia ====
▌2. William H. Crawford (DR), until March 23, 1813

▌William B. Bulloch (DR), April 8, 1813 – November 6, 1813
▌William W. Bibb (DR), from November 6, 1813

▌3. Charles Tait (DR)

==== Kentucky ====
▌2. George M. Bibb (DR), until August 23, 1814

▌George Walker (DR), August 30, 1814 – December 16, 1814
▌William T. Barry (DR), from December 16, 1814

▌3. Jesse Bledsoe (DR), until December 24, 1814

▌Isham Talbot (DR), from February 2, 1815

==== Louisiana ====
▌2. James Brown (DR)
▌3. Eligius Fromentin (DR)

==== Maryland ====
▌1. Samuel Smith (DR)
▌3. Robert H. Goldsborough (F), from May 21, 1813

==== Massachusetts ====
▌1. James Lloyd (F), until May 1, 1813

▌Christopher Gore (F), from May 5, 1813

▌2. Joseph Bradley Varnum (DR)

==== New Hampshire ====
▌2. Nicholas Gilman (DR), until May 2, 1814

▌Thomas W. Thompson (F), from June 24, 1814

▌3. Charles Cutts (F), April 2, 1813 – June 10, 1813

▌Jeremiah Mason (F), from June 10, 1813

==== New Jersey ====
▌1. John Lambert (DR)
▌2. John Condit (DR)

==== New York ====
▌1. Obadiah German (DR)
▌3. Rufus King (F)

==== North Carolina ====
▌2. James Turner (DR)
▌3. David Stone (DR), until December 24, 1814

▌Francis Locke Jr. (DR), from sometime thereafter (date unknown) [data missing]

==== Ohio ====
▌1. Thomas Worthington (DR), until December 1, 1814

▌Joseph Kerr (DR), from December 10, 1814

▌3. Jeremiah Morrow (DR)

==== Pennsylvania ====
▌1. Michael Leib (DR), until February 14, 1814

▌Jonathan Roberts (DR), from February 24, 1814

▌3. Abner Lacock (DR)

==== Rhode Island ====
▌1. William Hunter (F)
▌2. Jeremiah B. Howell (DR)

==== South Carolina ====
▌2. John Taylor (DR)
▌3. John Gaillard (DR)

==== Tennessee ====
▌1. Joseph Anderson (DR)
▌2. George W. Campbell (DR), until February 11, 1814

▌Jesse Wharton (DR), from March 17, 1814

==== Vermont ====
▌1. Jonathan Robinson (DR)
▌3. Dudley Chase (DR)

==== Virginia ====
▌1. Richard Brent (DR), until December 30, 1814

▌James Barbour (DR), from January 2, 1815

▌2. William Branch Giles (DR), until March 3, 1815

Senators' party membership by state at the opening of the 13th Congress in March 1813. 2 Democratic-Republicans 1 Democratic-Republican and 1 Federalist 2 Federalists

=== House of Representatives ===
==== Connecticut ====
All representatives were elected statewide on a general ticket.

▌At-large. Epaphroditus Champion (F)
▌At-large. John Davenport (F)
▌At-large. Lyman Law (F)
▌At-large. Jonathan O. Moseley (F)
▌At-large. Timothy Pitkin (F)
▌At-large. Lewis B. Sturges (F)
▌At-large. Benjamin Tallmadge (F)

==== Delaware ====
Both representatives were elected statewide on a general ticket.

▌At-large. Thomas Cooper (F)
▌At-large. Henry M. Ridgely (F)

==== Georgia ====
All representatives were elected statewide on a general ticket.

▌At-large. William Barnett (DR)
▌At-large. William W. Bibb (DR), until November 6, 1813

▌Alfred Cuthbert (DR), from December 13, 1813

▌At-large. John Forsyth (DR)
▌At-large. Bolling Hall (DR)
▌At-large. Thomas Telfair (DR)
▌At-large. George Troup (DR)

==== Kentucky ====
▌1. James Clark (DR)
▌2. Henry Clay (DR), until January 19, 1814

▌Joseph H. Hawkins (DR), from March 29, 1814

▌3. Richard Mentor Johnson (DR)
▌4. Joseph Desha (DR)
▌5. Samuel Hopkins (DR)
▌6. Solomon P. Sharp (DR)
▌7. Samuel McKee (DR)
▌8. Stephen Ormsby (DR), from April 20, 1813
▌9. Thomas Montgomery (DR)
▌10. William Pope Duval (DR)

==== Louisiana ====
▌At-large. Thomas B. Robertson (DR)

==== Maryland ====
The 5th district was a plural district with two representatives.

▌1. Philip Stuart (F)
▌2. Joseph Kent (DR)
▌3. Alexander C. Hanson (F)
▌4. Samuel Ringgold (DR)
▌5. Alexander McKim (DR)
▌5. Nicholas R. Moore (DR)
▌6. Stevenson Archer (DR)
▌7. Robert Wright (DR)
▌8. Charles Goldsborough (F)

==== Massachusetts ====
▌1. Artemas Ward Jr. (F)
▌2. William Reed (F)
▌3. Timothy Pickering (F)
▌4. William M. Richardson (DR), until April 18, 1814

▌Samuel Dana (DR), from September 22, 1814

▌5. William Ely (F)
▌6. Samuel Taggart (F)
▌7. William Baylies (F)
▌8. John Reed Jr. (F)
▌9. Laban Wheaton (F)
▌10. Elijah Brigham (F)
▌11. Abijah Bigelow (F)
▌12. Daniel Dewey (F), until February 24, 1814

▌John W. Hulbert (F), from November 2, 1814

▌13. Nathaniel Ruggles (F)
▌14. Cyrus King (F)
▌15. George Bradbury (F)
▌16. Samuel Davis (F)
▌17. Abiel Wood (DR)
▌18. John Wilson (F)
▌19. James Parker (DR)
▌20. Levi Hubbard (DR)

==== New Hampshire ====
All representatives were elected statewide on a general ticket.

▌At-large. Bradbury Cilley (F)
▌At-large. William Hale (F)
▌At-large. Samuel Smith (F)
▌At-large. Roger Vose (F)
▌At-large. Daniel Webster (F)
▌At-large. Jeduthun Wilcox (F)

==== New Jersey ====
There were three plural districts, each had two representatives each.

▌1. Lewis Condict (DR)
▌1. Thomas Ward (DR)
▌2. James Schureman (F)
▌2. Richard Stockton (F)
▌3. William Coxe Jr. (F)
▌3. Jacob Hufty (F), until May 20, 1814

▌Thomas Bines (DR), from November 2, 1814

==== New York ====
There were six plural districts, the 1st, 2nd, 12th, 15th, 20th & 21st, each had two representatives.

▌1. John Lefferts (DR)
▌1. Ebenezer Sage (DR)
▌2. Egbert Benson (F), until August 2, 1813

▌William Irving (DR), from January 22, 1814

▌2. Jotham Post Jr. (F)
▌3. Peter Denoyelles (DR)
▌4. Thomas J. Oakley (F)
▌5. Thomas P. Grosvenor (F)
▌6. Jonathan Fisk (DR)
▌7. Abraham J. Hasbrouck (DR)
▌8. Samuel Sherwood (F)
▌9. John Lovett (F)
▌10. Hosea Moffitt (F)
▌11. John W. Taylor (DR)
▌12. Zebulon R. Shipherd (F)
▌12. Elisha I. Winter (F)
▌13. Alexander Boyd (F)
▌14. Jacob Markell (F)
▌15. John M. Bowers (F), from June 21, 1813, until December 20, 1813

▌Isaac Williams Jr. (DR), from January 24, 1814

▌15. Joel Thompson (F)
▌16. Morris S. Miller (F)
▌17. William Stephens Smith (F)
▌18. Moss Kent (F)
▌19. James Geddes (F)
▌20. Daniel Avery (DR)
▌20. Oliver C. Comstock (DR)
▌21. Samuel M. Hopkins (F)
▌21. Nathaniel W. Howell (F)

==== North Carolina ====
▌1. William H. Murfree (DR)
▌2. Willis Alston (DR)
▌3. William Kennedy (DR)
▌4. William Gaston (F)
▌5. William R. King (DR)
▌6. Nathaniel Macon (DR)
▌7. John Culpepper (F)
▌8. Richard Stanford (DR)
▌9. Bartlett Yancey (DR)
▌10. Joseph Pearson (F)
▌11. Peter Forney (DR)
▌12. Israel Pickens (DR)
▌13. Meshack Franklin (DR)

==== Ohio ====
▌1. John McLean (DR)
▌2. John Alexander (DR)
▌3. William Creighton Jr. (DR), from May 4, 1813
▌4. James Caldwell (DR)
▌5. James Kilbourne (DR)
▌6. Reasin Beall (DR), from April 20, 1813, until June 7, 1814

▌David Clendenin (DR), from October 11, 1814

==== Pennsylvania ====
There were six plural districts, the 2nd, 3rd, 5th, 6th & 10th had two representatives each, the 1st had four representatives.

▌1. William Anderson (DR)
▌1. John Conard (DR)
▌1. Charles Jared Ingersoll (DR)
▌1. Adam Seybert (DR)
▌2. Roger Davis (DR)
▌2. Jonathan Roberts (DR), until February 24, 1814

▌Samuel Henderson (F), from October 11, 1814

▌3. John Gloninger (F), until August 2, 1813

▌Edward Crouch (DR), from October 12, 1813

▌3. James Whitehill (DR), until September 1, 1814

▌Amos Slaymaker (F), from October 11, 1814

▌4. Hugh Glasgow (DR)
▌5. William Crawford (DR)
▌5. Robert Whitehill (DR), until April 8, 1813

▌John Rea (DR), from May 11, 1813

▌6. Robert Brown (DR)
▌6. Samuel D. Ingham (DR)
▌7. John M. Hyneman (DR), until August 2, 1813

▌Daniel Udree (DR), from October 12, 1813

▌8. William Piper (DR)
▌9. David Bard (DR)
▌10. Jared Irwin (DR)
▌10. Isaac Smith (DR)
▌11. William Findley (DR)
▌12. Aaron Lyle (DR)
▌13. Isaac Griffin (DR), from May 24, 1813
▌14. Adamson Tannehill (DR)
▌15. Thomas Wilson (DR), from May 14, 1813

==== Rhode Island ====
Both representatives were elected statewide on a general ticket.

▌At-large. Richard Jackson Jr. (F)
▌At-large. Elisha Reynolds Potter (F)

==== South Carolina ====
▌1. Langdon Cheves (DR)
▌2. William Lowndes (DR)
▌3. Theodore Gourdin (DR)
▌4. John J. Chappell (DR)
▌5. David R. Evans (DR)
▌6. John C. Calhoun (DR)
▌7. Elias Earle (DR)
▌8. Samuel Farrow (DR)
▌9. John Kershaw (DR)

==== Tennessee ====
▌1. John Rhea (DR)
▌2. John Sevier (DR)
▌3. Thomas K. Harris (DR)
▌4. John H. Bowen (DR)
▌5. Felix Grundy (DR), until July 1814

▌Newton Cannon (DR), from September 16, 1814

▌6. Parry Wayne Humphreys (DR)

==== Vermont ====
All representatives were elected statewide on a general ticket.

▌At-large. William C. Bradley (DR)
▌At-large. Ezra Butler (DR)
▌At-large. James Fisk (DR)
▌At-large. Charles Rich (DR)
▌At-large. Richard Skinner (DR)
▌At-large. William Strong (DR)

==== Virginia ====
▌1. John G. Jackson (DR)
▌2. Francis White (F)
▌3. John Smith (DR)
▌4. William McCoy (DR)
▌5. James Breckinridge (F)
▌6. Daniel Sheffey (F)
▌7. Hugh Caperton (F)
▌8. Joseph Lewis Jr. (F)
▌9. John Hungerford (DR)
▌10. Aylett Hawes (DR)
▌11. John Dawson (DR), until March 31, 1814

▌Philip P. Barbour (DR), from September 19, 1814

▌12. John Roane (DR)
▌13. Thomas M. Bayly (F)
▌14. William A. Burwell (DR)
▌15. John Kerr (DR)
▌16. John Wayles Eppes (DR)
▌17. James Pleasants (DR)
▌18. Thomas Gholson Jr. (DR)
▌19. Peterson Goodwyn (DR)
▌20. James Johnson (DR)
▌21. Thomas Newton Jr. (DR)
▌22. Hugh Nelson (DR)
▌23. John Clopton (DR)

==== Non-voting delegates ====
Illinois Territory. Shadrach Bond, until August 2, 1813

Benjamin Stephenson, from November 14, 1814

Indiana Territory. Jonathan Jennings
Mississippi Territory. William Lattimore
Missouri Territory. Edward Hempstead, until September 17, 1814

Rufus Easton, from September 17, 1814

== Changes in membership ==
The count below reflects changes from the beginning of the first session of this Congress.

=== Senate ===
- Replacements: 9
  - Democratic-Republicans: 2 seat net loss
  - Federalists: 2 seat net gain
- Deaths: 2
- Resignations: 10
- Interim appointments: 3
- Vacancies: 3
- Total seats with changes: 15

Senate changes
State (class)	Vacated by	Reason for change	Successor	Date of successor's formal installation (Note: When seated or oath administered, not necessarily when service began.)
New Hampshire (3)	Vacant	Legislature had failed to elect a Senator. Successor was appointed April 2, 1813 to continue the term.	Charles Cutts (DR)	Appointed April 2, 1813
Maryland (3)	Vacant	Legislature had failed to elect a Senator. Successor was elected late May 21, 1813 to finish the term.	Robert Henry Goldsborough (F)	Seated May 21, 1813
Delaware (2)	Vacant	James A. Bayard (F) resigned at the end of the previous Congress. Successor elected May 28, 1813 to finish the term.	William H. Wells (F)	Seated May 28, 1813
Georgia (2)	William H. Crawford (DR)	Resigned March 23, 1813. Successor appointed April 8, 1813, to continue the term.	William B. Bulloch (DR)	Seated April 8, 1813
Connecticut (3)	Chauncey Goodrich (F)	Resigned May 1813 to become Lieutenant Governor of Connecticut. Successor elected May 13, 1813, to finish the term.	David Daggett (F)	Seated May 13, 1813
Massachusetts (1)	James Lloyd (F)	Resigned May 1, 1813. Successor elected May 5, 1813.	Christopher Gore (F)	Seated May 5, 1813
New Hampshire (3)	Charles Cutts (DR)	Interim appointee was not elected. Successor elected June 10, 1813.	Jeremiah Mason (F)	Seated June 10, 1813
Georgia (2)	William B. Bulloch (DR)	Interim appointee was not elected to finish the term. Successor elected November 6, 1813 to finish the term.	William W. Bibb (DR)	Seated November 6, 1813
Tennessee (2)	George W. Campbell (DR)	Resigned February 11, 1814 after being appointed US Secretary of the Treasury. Successor appointed March 17, 1814, to continue the term.	Jesse Wharton (DR)	Seated March 17, 1814
Pennsylvania (1)	Michael Leib (DR)	Resigned February 14, 1814 after becoming Postmaster of Philadelphia. Successor elected February 24, 1814, to finish term.	Jonathan Roberts (DR)	Seated February 24, 1814
New Hampshire (2)	Nicholas Gilman (DR)	Died May 2, 1814. Successor elected June 24, 1814, to finish the term.	Thomas W. Thompson (F)	Seated June 24, 1814
Kentucky (2)	George M. Bibb (DR)	Resigned August 23, 1814. Successor appointed August 30, 1814, to continue the term.	George Walker (DR)	Seated August 30, 1814
Ohio (1)	Thomas Worthington (DR)	Resigned December 1, 1814 after being elected Governor. Successor elected December 10, 1814, to finish the term ending.	Joseph Kerr (DR)	Seated December 10, 1814
Kentucky (2)	George Walker (DR)	Interim appointee was not elected to finish term. Successor elected December 16, 1814 to finish term.	William T. Barry (DR)	Seated December 16, 1814
North Carolina (3)	David Stone (DR)	Resigned December 24, 1814. Successor elected December 24, 1814, to finish the term, but failed to qualify.	Francis Locke Jr.	Never seated for failing to qualify
Kentucky (3)	Jesse Bledsoe (DR)	Resigned December 24, 1814. Successor elected February 2, 1815, to finish the term.	Isham Talbot (DR)	Seated February 2, 1815
Virginia (1)	Richard Brent (DR)	Died December 30, 1814. Winner elected January 2, 1815, to finish term, having already won election to the next term.	James Barbour (DR)	Seated January 2, 1815
Virginia (2)	William Branch Giles (DR)	Resigned March 3, 1815. Successor was not elected until the next Congress.	Vacant for remainder of this Congress.	

=== House of Representatives ===
- Replacements: 13
  - Democratic-Republicans: 17-seat net gain
  - Federalists: 2-seat net loss
- Deaths: 6
- Resignations: 13
- Contested election: 1
- Vacancies: 4
- Total seats with changes: 19

House changes
District	Vacated by	Reason for change	Successor	Date of successor's formal installation
Kentucky; 8th	Vacant	Rep.-elect John Simpson died before this Congress began	Stephen Ormsby (DR)	Seated May 28, 1813
Ohio; 6th	Vacant	Rep.-elect John Stark Edwards died before this Congress began	Reasin Beall (DR)	Seated June 8, 1813
Pennsylvania; 15th	Vacant	Rep.-elect Abner Lacock resigned before commencement of Congress after being elected US Senator	Thomas Wilson (DR)	Seated May 28, 1813
Pennsylvania; 13th	Vacant	Rep.-elect John Smilie died before this Congress began	Isaac Griffin (DR)	Seated May 24, 1813
New York; 15th	Vacant	Rep-elect William Dowse died on February 18, 1813	John M. Bowers (F)	Seated June 21, 1813
Ohio; 3rd	Vacant	Duncan McArthur Resigned April 5, 1813, having not qualified	William Creighton Jr. (DR)	Seated June 15, 1813
Pennsylvania; 5th	Robert Whitehill (DR)	Died April 8, 1813	John Rea (DR)	Seated May 28, 1813
New York; 2nd	Egbert Benson (F)	Resigned August 2, 1813	William Irving (DR)	Seated January 22, 1814
Pennsylvania; 3rd	John Gloninger (F)	Resigned August 2, 1813	Edward Crouch (DR)	Seated December 6, 1813
Pennsylvania; 7th	John M. Hyneman (DR)	Resigned August 2, 1813	Daniel Udree (DR)	Seated December 6, 1813
Illinois Territory at-large	Shadrach Bond	Until August 2, 1813	Benjamin Stephenson	Seated November 14, 1814
Georgia at-large	William W. Bibb (DR)	Resigned November 6, 1813, after being elected to US Senate	Alfred Cuthbert (DR)	Seated February 7, 1814
New York; 15th	John M. Bowers (F)	Contested election, Bowers ousted on December 20, 1813	Isaac Williams Jr. (DR)	Seated January 24, 1814
Tennessee; 5th	Felix Grundy (DR)	Resigned in July 1814	Newton Cannon (DR)	Seated October 15, 1814
Kentucky; 2nd	Henry Clay (DR)	Resigned January 19, 1814	Joseph H. Hawkins (DR)	Seated March 29, 1814
Massachusetts; 12th	Daniel Dewey (F)	Resigned February 24, 1814, after being appointed Associate Judge of Massachusetts Supreme Court	John W. Hulbert (F)	Seated September 26, 1814
Pennsylvania; 2nd	Jonathan Roberts (DR)	Resigned February 24, 1814, after being elected US Senator	Samuel Henderson (F)	Seated November 29, 1814
Virginia; 11th	John Dawson (DR)	Died March 31, 1814	Philip P. Barbour (DR)	Seated September 19, 1814
Massachusetts; 4th	William M. Richardson (DR)	Resigned April 18, 1814	Samuel Dana (DR)	Seated September 22, 1814
New Jersey; 3rd	Jacob Hufty (F)	Died May 20, 1814	Thomas Bines (DR)	Seated November 2, 1814
Ohio; 6th	Reasin Beall (DR)	Resigned June 7, 1814	David Clendenin (DR)	Seated December 22, 1814
Pennsylvania; 3rd	James Whitehill (DR)	Resigned September 1, 1814	Amos Slaymaker (F)	Seated December 12, 1814
Missouri Territory at-large	Edward Hempstead	Until September 17, 1814	Rufus Easton	Seated November 16, 1814

== Committees ==
Lists of committees and their party leaders.

=== Senate ===
- Army Supply Contracts (Select) (Chairman: N/A)
- Audit and Control the Contingent Expenses of the Senate (Chairman: Michael Leib)
- Engrossed Bills (Chairman: Jeremiah B. Howell)
- National University (Chairman: N/A)
- Whole

=== House of Representatives ===
- Accounts (Chairman: Israel Pickens then Nicholas R. Moore then John Kershaw)
- Banks of the District of Columbia (Select)
- Claims (Chairman: Stevenson Archer then Bartlett Yancey)
- Commerce and Manufactures (Chairman: Thomas Newton Jr.)
- District of Columbia (Chairman: John Dawson)
- Elections (Chairman: James Fisk)
- Judiciary (Chairman: Charles J. Ingersoll)
- Pensions and Revolutionary War Claims (Chairman: Samuel D. Ingham then John J. Chappell)
- Post Office and Post Roads (Chairman: John Rhea)
- Public Expenditures (Chairman: James Pleasants then Nathaniel Macon)
- Public Lands (Chairman: Samuel McKee)
- Revisal and Unfinished Business (Chairman: Willis Alston then Lewis Condict then Richard Stanford)
- Rules (Select)
- Standards of Official Conduct
- Ways and Means (Chairman: John W. Eppes)
- Whole

=== Joint committees ===
- Enrolled Bills (Chairman: N/A)
- The Library (Chairman: N/A)

== Employees ==
- Librarian of Congress: Patrick Magruder

=== Senate ===
- Chaplain: John Brackenridge (Presbyterian), until September 27, 1814
  - Jesse Lee, Methodist, elected September 27, 1814
- Secretary: Samuel Allyne Otis, until April 22, 1814
  - Charles Cutts, elected October 12, 1814
- Sergeant at Arms: Mountjoy Bayly

=== House of Representatives ===
- Chaplain: Jesse Lee (Methodist), until September 27, 1814
  - Obadiah B. Brown (Baptist), elected September 27, 1814
- Clerk: Patrick Magruder, until January 30, 1815
  - Thomas Dougherty, elected January 30, 1815
- Doorkeeper: Thomas Claxton
- Sergeant at Arms: Thomas Dunn

== See also ==
- 1812 United States elections (elections leading to this Congress)
  - 1812 United States presidential election
  - 1812–13 United States Senate elections
  - 1812–13 United States House of Representatives elections
- 1814 United States elections (elections during this Congress, leading to the next Congress)
  - 1814–15 United States Senate elections
  - 1814–15 United States House of Representatives elections
