= James Whitehill =

American politician

James Whitehill (January 31, 1762 – February 26, 1822) was a member of the U.S. House of Representatives from Pennsylvania.

James Whitehill (son of John Whitehill and nephew of Robert Whitehill) was born in Strasburg, Pennsylvania. He studied law, was admitted to the bar and commenced practice in Strasburg. He served as associate judge of the Lancaster County Court from January 3, 1811, to February 1, 1813, when he resigned, having been elected to Congress. He served in the War of 1812 as major general of Pennsylvania Militia.

Whitehill was elected as a Republican to the Thirteenth Congress and served until his resignation on September 1, 1814. He engaged in mercantile pursuits in Strasburg and served as burgess of Strasburg in 1816. He was again associate judge of the county court from October 17, 1820, until his death in Strasburg in 1822. Interment in the Presbyterian Church Cemetery in Leacock, Pennsylvania.

== Sources ==
- United States Congress. "James Whitehill (id: W000402)". Biographical Directory of the United States Congress.
- The Political Graveyard

U.S. House of Representatives
Preceded by Roger Davis; John M. Hyneman; Joseph Lefever	Member of the U.S. House of Representatives from Pennsylvania's 3rd congressional district 1813–1814 alongside: John Gloninger	Succeeded by Edward Crouch; Amos Slaymaker
