= Edward Crouch =

American politician

Member of the U.S. House of Representatives from Pennsylvania's 3rd district
- In office October 12, 1813 – March 3, 1815
- Preceded by: James Whitehill, John Gloninger
- Succeeded by: John Whiteside, James M. Wallace

Member of the Pennsylvania House of Representatives
- In office 1804-1806

Personal details
- Born: November 9, 1764 Walnut Hill, Province of Pennsylvania, British America
- Died: February 2, 1827 (aged 62) Walnut Hill, Pennsylvania, U.S.
- Party: Republican

Edward Crouch (November 9, 1764 – February 2, 1827) was a member of the U.S. House of Representatives from Pennsylvania.

== Early life ==
Edward Crouch was born at Walnut Hill in the Province of Pennsylvania on November 9, 1764. His father James Crouch was an officer of the Revolution and his mother was named Hannah Brown.

== American Revolutionary War ==
At the age of seventeen, Crouch enlisted during the American Revolutionary War. He commanded a company in the Whisky Rebellion of 1794.

== Political career ==
He was a member of the Pennsylvania House of Representatives from 1804 to 1806. He was appointed associate judge of Dauphin County, Pennsylvania, on April 16, 1813, but resigned upon election to Congress.

Crouch was elected as a Democratic-Republican to the Thirteenth Congress to fill the vacancy caused by the resignation of John Gloninger. He owned slaves.

== Later life and death ==
He returned to Walnut Hill and resided there until his death in 1827. Interment in Paxtang Cemetery near Harrisburg, Pennsylvania.

U.S. House of Representatives
Preceded by James Whitehill; John Gloninger	Member of the U.S. House of Representatives from Pennsylvania's 3rd congressional district 1813–1815 alongside: Amos Slaymaker	Succeeded by John Whiteside; James M. Wallace
