= John Gloninger =

American politician

Member of the U.S. House of Representatives from Pennsylvania's 3rd district
- In office March 4, 1813 – August 2, 1813
- Preceded by: See below
- Succeeded by: See below

Member of the Pennsylvania Senate
- In office 1790-1792

Member of the Pennsylvania House of Representatives
- In office 1790

Personal details
- Born: September 19, 1758 Lebanon Township, Province of Pennsylvania, British America
- Died: January 22, 1836 (aged 77) Lebanon, Pennsylvania, U.S.
- Party: Federalist

John Gloninger (September 19, 1758 – January 22, 1836) was a member of the U.S. House of Representatives from Pennsylvania.

== Biography ==
John Gloninger was born in Lebanon Township in the Province of Pennsylvania. He served as a subaltern officer in the Associaters during the Revolutionary War and later was in command of a battalion of militia. Upon the organization of Dauphin County, Pennsylvania, he was appointed a lieutenant by the supreme executive council on May 6, 1785. He was a member of the Pennsylvania House of Representatives in 1790. He resigned and served in the Pennsylvania State Senate from 1790 until 1792. He was appointed by Governor Thomas Mifflin as justice of the peace of Dauphin County on September 8, 1790. He was commissioned as associate judge on August 17, 1791, and upon the formation of Lebanon County, Pennsylvania, he was commissioned on September 11, 1813, as one of the associate judges for that county.

Gloninger was elected as a Federalist to the Thirteenth Congress and until his resignation on August 2, 1813. He was again appointed associate judge of Lebanon County and died in Lebanon, Pennsylvania. Interment in First Reformed Churchyard.

== Sources ==
- United States Congress. "John Gloninger (id: G000241)". Biographical Directory of the United States Congress.
- The Political Graveyard

U.S. House of Representatives
Preceded by Roger Davis; John M. Hyneman; Joseph Lefever	Member of the U.S. House of Representatives from Pennsylvania's 3rd congressional district 1813 alongside:James Whitehill	Succeeded by Edward Crouch; Amos Slaymaker
