= Amos Slaymaker =

American politician

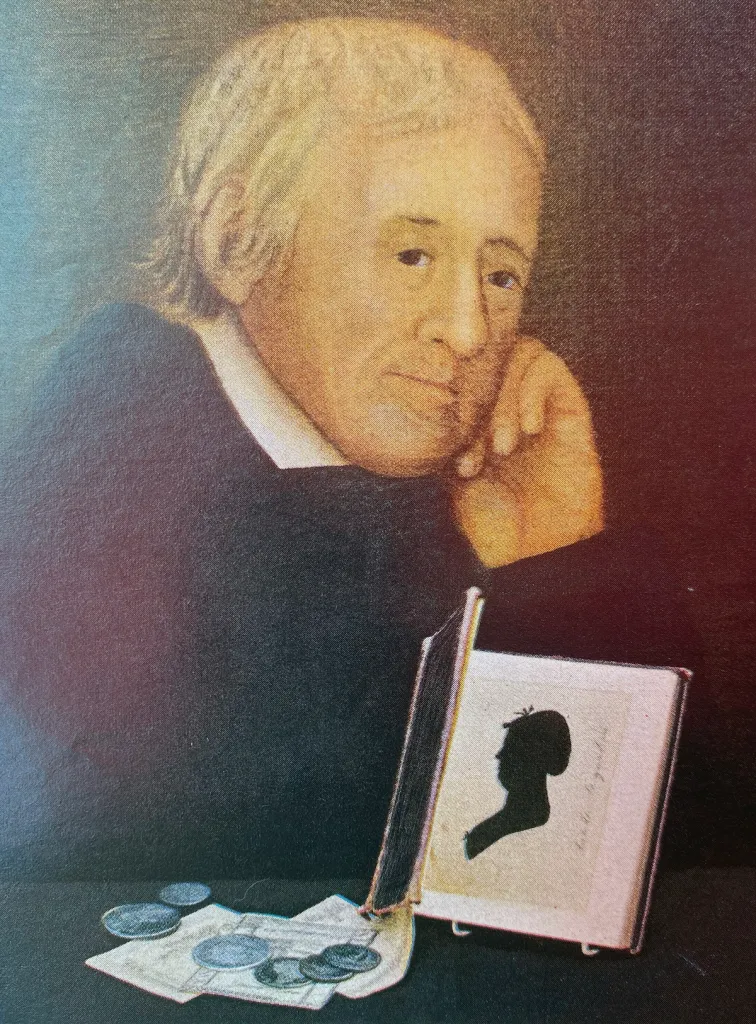
- portrait by his daughter, Hannah Slaymaker Evans

Personal details
- Born: March 11, 1755 Lancaster County, Province of Pennsylvania, British America
- Died: June 21, 1837 (aged 82) Salisbury Township, Pennsylvania, U.S.

Amos Slaymaker (March 11, 1755 – June 21, 1837) was a member of the U.S. House of Representatives from Pennsylvania. His younger sister, Faithful, was the mother of the nineteenth-century Presbyterian minister George Duffield.

== Biography ==
Amos Slaymaker was born at London Lands in Lancaster County in the Province of Pennsylvania. He built and operated a hotel on the Philadelphia and Lancaster Turnpike.

During the Revolutionary War, he served as an ensign in the company of Captain John Slaymaker. He was a member of an association formed for the suppression of Tory activities in Lancaster County, Pennsylvania.

A justice of the peace of Salisbury Township, Pennsylvania and county commissioner from 1806 to 1810, he then served in the Pennsylvania State Senate in 1810 and 1811.

Slaymaker was elected as a Federalist to the Thirteenth Congress to fill the vacancy caused by the resignation of James Whitehill.

== Death and interment ==
Slaymaker died in Salisbury on June 21, 1837, and was interred in the Leacock Presbyterian Cemetery in Paradise.

U.S. House of Representatives
Preceded by James Whitehill; John Gloninger	Member of the U.S. House of Representatives from Pennsylvania's 3rd congressional district 1814–1815 alongside:Edward Crouch	Succeeded by John Whiteside; James M. Wallace
