= 1820–21 United States Senate elections =

- Dates vary by state
- Class 1

15 of the 46 seats in the United States Senate (plus special elections) 24 seats needed for a majority
	Majority party	Minority party
Party	Democratic-Republican	Federalist
Last election	30 seats	9 seats
Seats before	37	9
Seats won	11	1
Seats after	38	5
Seat change	▲1	▼4
Seats up	10	5
- Results: Dem-Republican hold Dem-Republican gain Federalist hold Legislature failed to elect
Majority party before election
Democratic-Republican
Elected Majority party
Democratic-Republican

The 1820–21 United States Senate elections were held on various dates in various states, corresponding with James Monroe's landslide re-election. As these U.S. Senate elections were prior to the ratification of the Seventeenth Amendment in 1913, senators were chosen by state legislatures. Senators were elected over a wide range of time throughout 1820 and 1821, and a seat may have been filled months late or remained vacant due to legislative deadlock. In these elections, terms were up for the senators in Class 1.

The Democratic-Republican Party gain one-to-five seats (in the general and special elections), assuming almost complete control of the Senate.

== Results summary ==
Senate party division, 17th Congress (1821–1823)

- Majority party: Democratic-Republican (39–43)
- Minority party: Federalist (4)
- Vacant: (3–1)
- Total seats: 46–48

== Change in composition ==
=== Before the elections ===
Composition after the June 13 and 14, 1820 elections in Maine.

							DR_{1} Maine; New seat	DR_{2}	DR_{3}
DR_{13}	DR_{12}	DR_{11}	DR_{10}	DR_{9}	DR_{8}	DR_{7}	DR_{6}	DR_{5}	DR_{4}
DR_{14}	DR_{15}	DR_{16}	DR_{17}	DR_{18}	DR_{19}	DR_{20}	DR_{21}	DR_{22}	DR_{23}
Majority →									DR_{24}
DR_{33} N.Y. Ran	DR_{32} N.J. Ran	DR_{31} Miss. Ran	DR_{30} Md. Ran	DR_{29} Maine; New seat Ran	DR_{28} Ind. Ran	DR_{27}	DR_{26}	DR_{25}	DR_{24}
DR_{34} Ohio; Ran	DR_{35} Va. Ran	DR_{36} Pa. Unknown	DR_{37} Tenn. Unknown	F_{9} Vt. Retired	F_{8} Del. Retired	F_{7} R.I. Unknown	F_{6} Mass. Ran	F_{5} Conn. Ran	F_{4}
							F_{1}	F_{2}	F_{3}

=== Result of the general elections ===
							DR_{1}	DR_{2}	DR_{3}
DR_{13}	DR_{12}	DR_{11}	DR_{10}	DR_{9}	DR_{8}	DR_{7}	DR_{6}	DR_{5}	DR_{4}
DR_{14}	DR_{15}	DR_{16}	DR_{17}	DR_{18}	DR_{19}	DR_{20}	DR_{21}	DR_{22}	DR_{23}
Majority →									DR_{24}
DR_{33} Va. Re-elected	DR_{32} Ohio; Re-elected	DR_{31} Miss. Re-elected	DR_{30} Md. Re-elected	DR_{29} Maine; Re-elected	DR_{28} Ind. Re-elected	DR_{27}	DR_{26}	DR_{25}	DR_{24}
DR_{34} N.J. Hold	DR_{35} N.Y. Hold	DR_{36} Conn. Gain	DR_{37} R.I. Gain	DR_{38} Vt. Gain	V_{1} Pa. DR loss	V_{2} Tenn. DR loss	V_{3} Del. F loss	F_{5} Mass. Re-elected	F_{4}
							F_{1}	F_{2}	F_{3}

=== Result of the special elections in the next Congress ===
						DR_{1} Mo. New seat	DR_{2} Mo. New seat	DR_{3}	DR_{4} Ga. Hold
DR_{14}	DR_{13}	DR_{12}	DR_{11}	DR_{10}	DR_{9}	DR_{8}	DR_{7}	DR_{6}	DR_{5}
DR_{15}	DR_{16}	DR_{17}	DR_{18}	DR_{19}	DR_{20}	DR_{21}	DR_{22}	DR_{23}	DR_{24}
Majority →									DR_{25}
DR_{34}	DR_{33}	DR_{32}	DR_{31}	DR_{30}	DR_{29}	DR_{28}	DR_{27}	DR_{26}	DR_{25}
DR_{35}	DR_{36}	DR_{37}	DR_{38}	DR_{39}	DR_{40}	DR_{41} Pa. Gain	DR_{42} Tenn. Gain	V_{1}	F_{5}
						F_{1}	F_{2}	F_{3}	F_{4}

Key:

DR_{#}	Democratic-Republican
F_{#}	Federalist
V_{#}	Vacant

== Race summaries ==
Bold states link to specific election articles.

=== Special elections during the preceding Congress ===
In these special elections, the winner was elected during 1820 or before March 4, 1821; ordered by election date.

State	Incumbent			Results	Candidates
State	Senator	Party	Electoral history	Results	Candidates
New York (Class 3)	Vacant			Legislature had failed to elect in 1818/1819. Previous incumbent was elected January 8, 1820. Federalist gain.	▌ ✓ Rufus King (Federalist) Unanimous
Massachusetts (Class 1)	Prentiss Mellen	Federalist	1820 (special)	Incumbent resigned to become Chief Justice of Maine. New senator elected June 12, 1820. Winner was also elected to the next term. Federalist hold.	▌ ✓ Elijah H. Mills (Federalist); [data missing]
Maine (2 seats)	None (new state)			Seats created March 15, 1820. Democratic-Republican gains.	First ballot (June 13, 1820): ▌ ✓ John Holmes (Democratic-Republican) 95 H; 15 S; ▌ ✓ John Chandler (Democratic-Republican) 78 H; 15 S; ▌Joshua Wingate Jr. (Democratic-Republican) 79 H; 5 S; ▌Albion Keith Parris (Democratic-Republican) 35 H; 0 S; ▌Ezekiel Whitman (Federalist) 2 H; 2 S; ▌James Neal (Unknown) 1 H; 0 S
Mississippi (Class 1)	Walter Leake	Democratic- Republican	1817	Incumbent resigned May 15, 1820. New senator elected August 30, 1820. Winner was also elected to the next term. Democratic-Republican hold.	▌ ✓ David Holmes (Democratic-Republican); [data missing]
Kentucky (Class 3)	William Logan	Democratic- Republican	1818	Incumbent resigned May 28, 1820 to run for Governor of Kentucky. New senator elected October 19, 1820. Democratic-Republican hold.	▌ ✓ Isham Talbot (Democratic-Republican); [data missing]
Rhode Island (Class 2)	James Burrill Jr.	Federalist	1816	Incumbent died December 25, 1820. New senator elected January 9, 1821. Democratic-Republican gain.	▌ ✓ Nehemiah R. Knight (Democratic-Republican); [data missing]

=== Races leading to the next Congress ===
In these general elections, the winner was seated on March 4, 1821; ordered by state.

All of the elections involved the Class 1 seats.

State	Incumbent			Results	Candidates
State	Senator	Party	Electoral history	Results	Candidates
Connecticut	Samuel Dana	Federalist	1810 (special); 1814	Incumbent retired or lost re-election. New senator elected March 4, 1821. Democratic-Republican gain.	▌ ✓ Elijah Boardman (Democratic-Republican); [data missing]
Delaware	Outerbridge Horsey	Federalist	1810 (special); 1815	Incumbent retired. Legislature failed to elect. Federalist loss. A Democratic-Republican was later elected in 1822.	[data missing]
Indiana	James Noble	Democratic- Republican	1816	Incumbent re-elected in 1821.	▌ ✓ James Noble (Democratic-Republican); [data missing]
Maine	John Holmes	Democratic- Republican	1820	Incumbent re-elected January 31, 1821.	▌ ✓ John Holmes (Democratic-Republican); [data missing]
Maryland	William Pinkney	Democratic- Republican	1819 (special)	Incumbent re-elected in 1820 or 1821.	▌ ✓ William Pinkney (Democratic-Republican); [data missing]
Massachusetts	Elijah H. Mills	Federalist	1820 (special)	Incumbent re-elected in 1820.	▌ ✓ Elijah H. Mills (Federalist) 65.3%; ▌Benjamin W. Crowninshield (Democratic-Republican) 31.3%; Scattering 3.3%
Mississippi	David Holmes	Democratic- Republican	1820 (special)	Incumbent re-elected in 1820 or 1821.	▌ ✓ David Holmes (Democratic-Republican); [data missing]
New Jersey	James J. Wilson	Democratic- Republican	1815	Incumbent lost re-election. New senator elected November 11, 1820. Democratic-Republican hold. Incumbent then resigned January 8, 1821, and winner was appointed to finish the term.	▌ ✓ Samuel L. Southard (Democratic-Republican) 55.6%; ▌James J. Wilson (Democratic-Republican) 44.4%
New York	Nathan Sanford	Democratic- Republican	1809	Incumbent lost re-election. New senator elected February 6, 1821. Democratic-Republican hold.	▌ ✓ Martin Van Buren (Democratic-Republican); ▌Nathan Sanford (Democratic-Republican)
Ohio	Benjamin Ruggles	Democratic- Republican	1815	Incumbent re-elected in 1820 or 1821.	▌ ✓ Benjamin Ruggles (Democratic-Republican); [data missing]
Pennsylvania	Jonathan Roberts	Democratic- Republican	1814 (special); 1814	Legislature failed to elect. Democratic-Republican loss. New senator would later be elected in 1821.	[data missing]
Rhode Island	William Hunter	Federalist	1811 (special); 1814	Incumbent retired or lost re-election. New senator elected in 1820 or 1821. Democratic-Republican gain.	▌ ✓ James DeWolf (Democratic-Republican); [data missing]
Tennessee	John H. Eaton	Democratic- Republican	1818 (appointed); 1819 (special)	Legislature failed to elect. Democratic-Republican loss. New senator would later be elected September 27, 1821; see below.	[data missing]
Vermont	Isaac Tichenor	Federalist	1796 (special); 1796; 1797 (resigned); 1814	Incumbent retired. New senator elected in 1821. Democratic-Republican gain.	▌ ✓ Horatio Seymour (Democratic-Republican); [data missing]
Virginia	James Barbour	Democratic- Republican	1814 (special); 1814	Incumbent re-elected in 1821.	▌ ✓ James Barbour (Democratic-Republican); [data missing]

=== Special elections during the next Congress ===
In this special election, the winner was elected in 1821 after March 4; ordered by election date.

State	Incumbent			Results	Candidates
State	Senator	Party	Electoral history	Results	Candidates
Missouri (Class 1)	None (new state)			New senator elected August 10, 1821. Democratic-Republican gain.	▌ ✓ Thomas H. Benton (Democratic-Republican); [data missing]
Missouri (Class 3)	None (new state)			New senator elected August 10, 1821. Democratic-Republican gain.	▌ ✓ David Barton (Democratic-Republican); [data missing]
Tennessee (Class 1)	Vacant			Legislature had failed to elect. New senator re-elected late September 27, 1821. Democratic-Republican gain.	▌ ✓ John H. Eaton (Democratic-Republican); [data missing]
Georgia (Class 2)	Freeman Walker	Democratic- Republican	1819 (special)	Incumbent resigned August 6, 1821. New senator elected November 10, 1821. Democratic-Republican hold.	▌ ✓ Nicholas Ware (Democratic-Republican); [data missing]
Pennsylvania (Class 1)	Vacant			Legislature had failed to elect. New senator elected December 10, 1821. Democratic-Republican gain.	▌ ✓ William Findlay (Democratic-Republican); [data missing]

== Maine ==
John Holmes (Democratic-Republican) was elected as one of the new state's first pair of senators, whose terms began with June 13, 1820 statehood. He was elected to the class 1 seat's short term, which ended March 3, 1821, and was re-elected on January 31, 1821, to the term starting March 4, 1821.

John Chandler (Democratic-Republican) was elected to the class 2 seat's long term, and his term would end on March 3, 1823.

== Maryland ==
1821 United States Senate election in Maryland
- December 7, 1821

80 members of the Maryland General Assembly
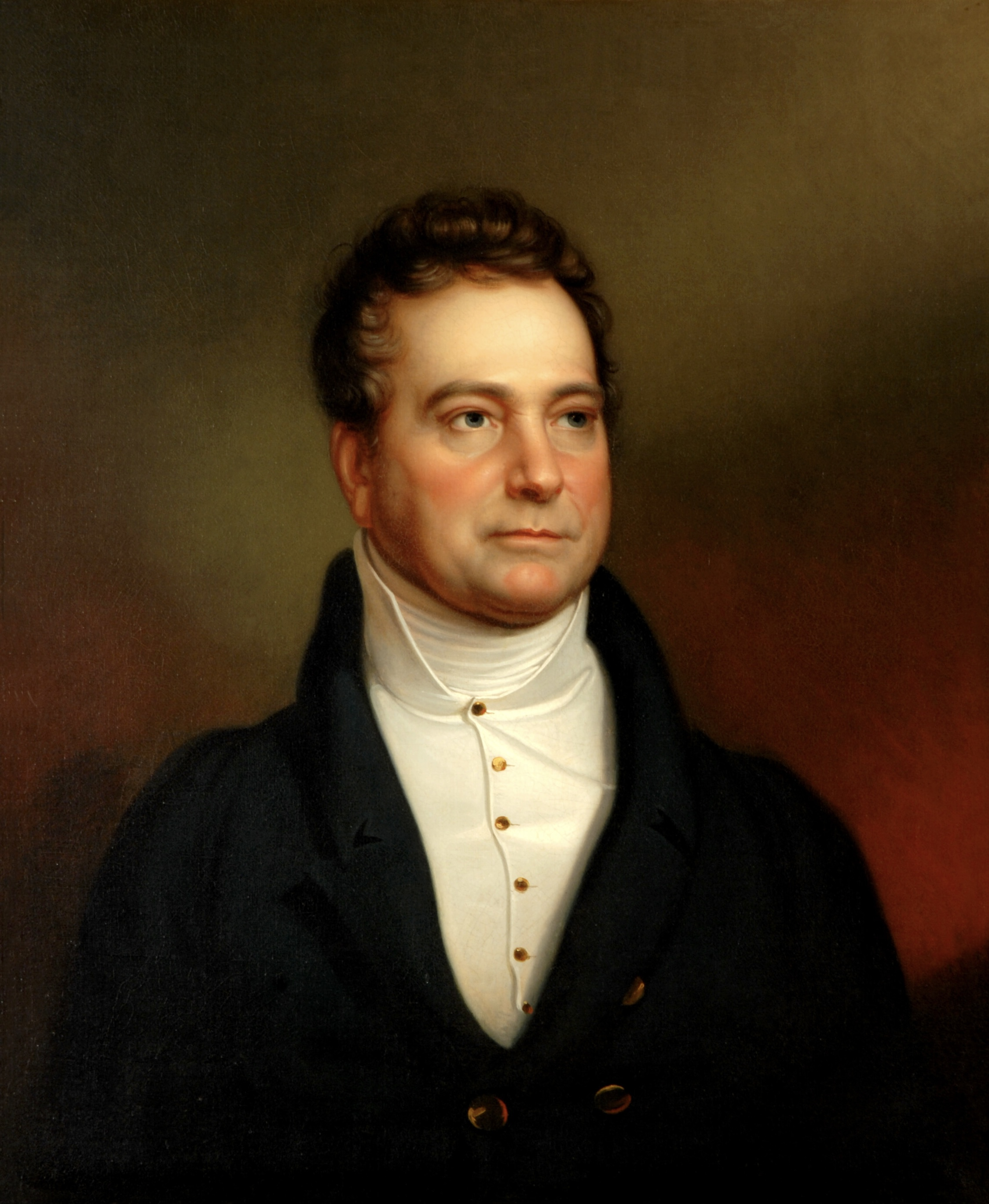
Candidate	William Pinkney
Party	Democratic-Republican
Legislative vote	-
Percentage	-%

William Pinkney won election by an unknown number of votes, for the Class 1 seat.

== See also ==
- 1820 United States elections
  - 1820 United States presidential election
  - 1820–21 United States House of Representatives elections
- 16th United States Congress
- 17th United States Congress
- Elections in the United States
