= List of elections in 1809 =

The following elections occurred in the year 1809.

== North America ==
=== United States ===
- 1809 United States lieutenant gubernatorial elections
  - 1809 Connecticut lieutenant gubernatorial election
- 1809 United States gubernatorial elections
  - 1809 Connecticut gubernatorial election
  - 1809 Georgia gubernatorial election
  - June 1809 Maryland gubernatorial election
  - November 1809 Maryland gubernatorial election
  - 1809 Massachusetts gubernatorial election
  - 1809 New Hampshire gubernatorial election
  - 1809 New Jersey gubernatorial election
  - 1809 North Carolina gubernatorial election
  - 1809 Rhode Island gubernatorial election
  - 1809 Tennessee gubernatorial election
  - 1809 Vermont gubernatorial election
  - 1809 Virginia gubernatorial election
- 1808 and 1809 United States House of Representatives elections
  - 1809 Pennsylvania's 1st congressional district special election
  - 1809 United States House of Representatives elections in Tennessee
  - 1809 United States House of Representatives elections in Virginia
- 1808 and 1809 United States Senate elections
  - 1809 United States Senate election in New York

== See also ==
- Category:1809 elections
