= 1814–15 United States Senate elections =

- Dates vary by state
- Class 1

12 of the 36 seats in the United States Senate (plus special elections) 19 seats needed for a majority
	Majority party	Minority party
Party	Democratic-Republican	Federalist
Last election	28 seats	8 seats
Seats before	26	10
Seats won	5	5
Seats after	22	11
Seat change	▼3	▲1
Seats up	8	4
- Results: Federalist hold Federalist gain Dem-Republican hold Legislature failed to elect
Majority party before election
Democratic-Republican
Elected Majority party
Democratic-Republican

The 1814–15 United States Senate elections were held on various dates in various states. As these U.S. Senate elections were prior to the ratification of the Seventeenth Amendment in 1913, senators were chosen by state legislatures. Senators were elected over a wide range of time throughout 1814 and 1815, and a seat may have been filled months late or remained vacant due to legislative deadlock. In these elections, terms were up for the senators in Class 1.

The Democratic-Republican Party lost a seat but still retained their overwhelming Senate majority. Unlike in recent elections, the minority Federalist Party had gone into the elections with a chance of regaining their long-lost majority had they swept almost all the seats. However, only one seat switched parties. Two seats held by Democratic-Republicans were left unfilled until long after the next Congress began.

== Change in composition ==
=== Before the elections ===
Composition after June 1814 special election in New Hampshire.

DR_{8}	DR_{7}	DR_{6}	DR_{5}	DR_{4}	DR_{3}	DR_{2}	DR_{1}		
DR_{9}	DR_{10}	DR_{11}	DR_{12}	DR_{13}	DR_{14}	DR_{15}	DR_{16}	DR_{17}	DR_{18}
Majority →									DR_{19} Md. Unknown
F_{9} Mass. (reg); Ran	F_{10} R.I. Ran	DR_{26} Va. Ran	DR_{25} Vt. Retired	DR_{24} Tenn. (reg); Retired	DR_{23} Pa. Ran	DR_{22} Ohio (reg); Retired	DR_{21} N.Y. Unknown	DR_{20} N.J. Ran	DR_{19} Md. Unknown
F_{8} Del. Ran	F_{7} Conn. Ran	F_{6}	F_{5}	F_{4}	F_{3}	F_{2}	F_{1}		

=== Result of the regular elections ===
DR_{8}	DR_{7}	DR_{6}	DR_{5}	DR_{4}	DR_{3}	DR_{2}	DR_{1}		
DR_{9}	DR_{10}	DR_{11}	DR_{12}	DR_{13}	DR_{14}	DR_{15}	DR_{16}	DR_{17}	DR_{18}
Majority →									DR_{19} N.J. Hold
F_{9} Mass. (reg); Re-elected	F_{10} R.I. Re-elected	F_{11} Vt. Gain	V_{1} Tenn. (reg); DR Loss	V_{2} Md. DR Loss	DR_{23} Va. Hold	DR_{22} Pa. (reg); Re-elected	DR_{21} Ohio (reg); Hold	DR_{20} N.Y. Hold	DR_{19} N.J. Hold
F_{8} Del. Re-elected	F_{7} Conn. Re-elected	F_{6}	F_{5}	F_{4}	F_{3}	F_{2}	F_{1}		

Key

DR_{#}	Democratic-Republican
F_{#}	Federalist
V_{#}	Vacant

== Race summaries ==
Except when noted, number following candidates is whole number votes.

=== Special elections during the preceding Congress ===
In these special elections, the winner was elected during 1814 or before March 4, 1815; ordered by election date.

State	Incumbent			Results	Candidates
State	Senator	Party	Electoral history	Results	Candidates
Pennsylvania (Class 3)	Michael Leib	Democratic- Republican	1809 (special); 1808	Incumbent resigned to become Postmaster of Philadelphia. New senator elected February 24, 1814. Democratic-Republican hold. Winner was never seated due to a failure to qualify.	▌ ✓ Jonathan Roberts (Democratic-Republican) 82; ▌Thomas Sergeant (Democratic-Republican) 23; ▌Horace Binney (Federalist) 8; ▌John Steele (Federalist) 1; ▌Horatio Gates Jones (Democratic-Republican) 1; ▌Isaac Wayne (Federalist) 1; Not voting 10
New Hampshire (Class 2)	Nicholas Gilman	Democratic- Republican	1804; 1810	Incumbent died May 4, 1814. New senator elected June 24, 1814. Federalist gain.	▌ ✓ Thomas W. Thompson (Federalist) 93; ▌Samuel Bell (Democratic-Republican) 80; Scattering 5
Ohio (Class 1)	Thomas Worthington	Democratic- Republican	1803; 1807 (retired); 1810 (special)	Incumbent resigned to become Governor of Ohio. New senator elected December 10, 1814 on the fourth ballot. Democratic-Republican hold.	▌ ✓ Joseph Kerr (Democratic-Republican) 42; ▌Benjamin Ruggles (Democratic-Republican) 36; ▌Duncan MacArthur (Unknown) 1; ▌David Purviance (Unknown) 1
Kentucky (Class 2)	George Walker	Democratic- Republican	1814 (appointed)	Interim appointee retired. New senator elected December 16, 1814. Democratic-Republican hold.	▌ ✓ William T. Barry (Democratic-Republican) 58; ▌Benjamin Mills (Unknown) 48
North Carolina (Class 3)	David Stone	Democratic- Republican	1800; 1807 (resigned); 1812	Incumbent resigned December 24, 1814. New senator elected December 30, 1814 on the eleventh ballot. Democratic-Republican hold. Winner was never seated due to a failure to qualify.	▌ ✓ Francis Locke Jr. (Democratic-Republican) 104; ▌John Stanly (Federalist) 75
Virginia (Class 1)	Richard Brent	Democratic- Republican	1809	Incumbent died December 30, 1814, having lost re-election, see below. New senator elected January 2, 1815, having already won election to the next term. Democratic-Republican hold.	▌ ✓ James Barbour (Democratic-Republican) 107; ▌William Wirt (Democratic-Republican) 80; Scattering 4
Kentucky (Class 3)	Jesse Bledsoe	Democratic- Republican	1813	Incumbent resigned. New senator elected January 3, 1815 on the second ballot. Democratic-Republican hold.	▌ ✓ Isham Talbot (Democratic-Republican) 56; ▌Benjamin Mills (Unknown) 50

=== Races leading to the next Congress ===
In these regular elections, the winner was seated on March 4, 1815; ordered by state.

All of the elections involved the Class 1 seats.

State	Incumbent			Results	Candidates
State	Senator	Party	Electoral history	Results	Candidates
Connecticut	Samuel Dana	Federalist	1810 (special)	Incumbent re-elected in 1814.	▌ ✓ Samuel Dana (Federalist); [data missing]
Delaware	Outerbridge Horsey	Federalist	1810 (special)	Incumbent re-elected January 13, 1815.	▌ ✓ Outerbridge Horsey (Federalist) 18; ▌John Warner (Democratic-Republican) 8
Maryland	Samuel Smith	Democratic- Republican	1802; 1808	Legislature failed to elect. A successor would not be elected until 1816. Democratic-Republican loss.	[data missing]
Massachusetts	Christopher Gore	Federalist	1813 (appointed)	Interim appointee elected in 1815.	▌ ✓ Christopher Gore (Federalist); [data missing]
New Jersey	John Lambert	Democratic- Republican	1808	Incumbent lost re-election. New senator elected February 1, 1815 on the third ballot. Democratic-Republican hold.	▌ ✓ James Wilson (Democratic-Republican) 29; ▌John Lambert (Federalist) 17; ▌Ebenezer Elmer (Democratic-Republican) Withdrew
New York	Obadiah German	Democratic- Republican	1809	Incumbent retired or lost re-election. New senator elected February 7, 1815. Democratic-Republican hold.	▌ ✓ Nathan Sanford (Democratic-Republican) 89; ▌James Emott (Federalist) 40; ▌John Jay (Federalist) 1; ▌Philetus Swift (Democratic-Republican) 1
Ohio	Joseph Kerr	Democratic- Republican	1814 (special)	Incumbent retired. New senator elected January 7, 1815 on the third ballot. Democratic-Republican hold.	▌ ✓ Benjamin Ruggles (Democratic-Republican) 42; ▌Duncan MacArthur (Unknown) 34; ▌William Creighton Jr. (Democratic-Republican) 5; ▌Peter Hitchcock (Democratic-Republican) 2
Pennsylvania	Jonathan Roberts	Democratic- Republican	1814 (special)	Incumbent re-elected December 10, 1814.	▌ ✓ Jonathan Roberts (Democratic-Republican) 84; ▌Samuel Sitgreaves (Federalist) 32; ▌Jared Ingersoll (Federalist) 1; Not voting 9
Rhode Island	William Hunter	Federalist	1811 (special)	Incumbent re-elected November 4, 1814.	▌ ✓ William Hunter (Federalist) Unanimous
Tennessee	Joseph Anderson	Democratic- Republican	1797 (special); 1799 (resigned); 1799 (special); 1803; 1809 (appointed); 1809 (special)	Incumbent retired. Legislature failed to elect. Democratic-Republican loss. A new senator would later be elected; see below.	None.
Vermont	Jonathan Robinson	Democratic- Republican	1807 (special); 1808	Incumbent retired. New senator elected October 25, 1814. Federalist gain.	▌ ✓ Isaac Tichenor (Federalist) 111; ▌Jonathan Robinson (Democratic-Republican) 83; ▌John Strong (Democratic-Republican) 7; Scattering 1
Virginia	Richard Brent	Democratic- Republican	1808	Incumbent lost re-election, and then died after the election. New senator elected November 14, 1814. Democratic-Republican hold.	▌ ✓ James Barbour (Democratic-Republican) 107; ▌William Wirt (Democratic-Republican) 80; Scattering 4

=== Special elections during the next Congress ===
In this special election, the winner was elected in 1815 after March 4; ordered by election date.

State	Incumbent			Results	Candidates
State	Senator	Party	Electoral history	Results	Candidates
Tennessee (Class 1)	Vacant			Legislature had failed to elect, see above. New senator elected October 10, 1815. Democratic-Republican gain.	▌ ✓ George W. Campbell (Democratic-Republican) 37; ▌Parry Wayne Humphreys (Democratic-Republican) 23
Tennessee (Class 2)	Jesse Wharton	Democratic- Republican	1814 (appointed)	Interim appointee retired. New senator elected October 10, 1815. Democratic-Republican hold.	▌ ✓ John Williams (Democratic-Republican) 32; ▌John Rhea (Democratic-Republican) 26
North Carolina (Class 3)	Francis Locke Jr.	Democratic- Republican	1800; 1812	Incumbent resigned, having failed to qualify. New senator elected December 5, 1815 on the fifth ballot. Democratic-Republican hold.	▌ ✓ Nathaniel Macon (Democratic-Republican) 101; ▌John Branch Jr. (Democratic-Republican) 59; Scattering 27
Virginia (Class 2)	William B. Giles	Democratic- Republican	1804 (appointed); 1804 (special); 1804; 1811	Incumbent resigned March 3, 1815. New senator elected December 7, 1815. Democratic-Republican hold. Winner subsequently declined to serve. A new senator was later elected in 1816.	▌ ✓ John Eppes (Democratic-Republican) 125; ▌John Mercer (Democratic-Republican) 43

== Kentucky (special) ==
There were two special elections in Kentucky: one in 1814 and the other in 1815.

== See also ==
- 1814 United States elections
  - 1814–15 United States House of Representatives elections
- 13th United States Congress
- 14th United States Congress

== Notes ==
- Party Division in the Senate, 1789-Present, via Senate.gov
