= List of United States representatives in the 10th Congress =

This is a complete list of United States representatives during the 10th United States Congress listed by seniority. For the most part, representatives are ranked by the beginning of their terms in office.

As an historical article, the districts and party affiliations listed reflect those during the 10th Congress (March 4, 1807 – March 3, 1809). Seats and party affiliations on similar lists for other congresses will be different for certain members.

This article describes the criteria for seniority in the House of Representatives and sets out the list of members by seniority. It is prepared on the basis of the interpretation of seniority applied to the House of Representatives in the current congress. Without information to the contrary, it is presumed that the twenty-first century-practice is identical to the seniority customs used during the 10th Congress.

== House seniority ==
Seniority in the House, for representatives with unbroken service, depends on the date on which the members first term began. That date is either the start of the Congress (4 March in odd numbered years, for the era up to and including the 73rd Congress starting in 1933) or the date of a special election during the Congress. Since many members start serving on the same day as others, ranking between them is based on alphabetical order by the last name of the representative.

Representatives in early congresses were often elected after the legal start of the Congress. Such representatives are attributed with unbroken seniority, from the legal start of the congressional term, if they were the first person elected to a seat in a Congress. The date of the election is indicated in a note.

The seniority date is normally taken from the members entry in the Biographical Directory of the United States Congress, except where the date given is the legal start of the Congress and the actual election (for someone who was not the first person elected to the seat in that Congress) was later. The date of election is taken from United States Congressional Elections 1788-1997. In a few instances the latter work provides dates, for the start and end of terms, which correct those in the Biographical Directory.

The Biographical Directory normally uses the date of a special election, as the seniority date. However, mostly in early congresses, the date of the member taking his seat can be the one given. The date of the special election is mentioned in a note to the list below, when that date is not used as the seniority date by the Biographical Directory.

Representatives who returned to the House, after having previously served, are credited with service equal to one less than the total number of terms they served. When a representative has served a prior term of less than two terms (i.e. prior term minus one equals less than one), he is ranked above all others whose service begins on the same day.

== Leadership ==
In this Congress the only formal leader was the speaker of the House. A speakership ballot was held on October 26, 1807, and Joseph B. Varnum (DR-MA) was elected.

Candidate	Ballot
Joseph B. Varnum (DR-MA)	59
Burwell Bassett (DR-VA)	17
Charles Goldsborough (F-MD)	17
Josiah Masters (DR-NY)	8
Thomas Blount (DR-NC)	7
John Dawson (DR-VA)	4
John Smilie (DR-PA)	2
Roger Nelson (DR-MD)	1
Timothy Pitkin (F-CT)	1
Benjamin Tallmadge (F-CT)	1

The title Dean of the House (sometimes known, in the nineteenth century, as Father of the House) was held by the member with the longest continuous service. It was not a leadership position.

== Standing committees ==
The House created its first standing committee, on April 13, 1789. There were seven standing committees, listed in the rules initially used by the 10th Congress. In 1808, new District of Columbia and Post Office & Post Roads Committees were added as standing committees.

Committees, in this period, were appointed for a session at a time by the speaker.

This list refers to the standing committees of the House in the 10th Congress, the year of establishment as a standing committee, the number of members assigned to the committee and the dates of appointment in each session, the end of the session and its chairman. Chairmen, who were re-appointed after serving in the previous Congress, are indicated by an *.

The first session was October 26, 1807 – April 25, 1808 (182 days) and the second session was November 7, 1808 – March 3, 1809 (117 days).

No.	Committee	From	Members	Appointed	Chairman
1	Accounts	1805	3	October 28, 1807 – April 25, 1808	Nicholas R. Moore (DR-MD)
1	Accounts	1805	3	November 8, 1808 – March 3, 1809	Nicholas R. Moore (DR-MD)
2	Claims	1794	7	October 28, 1807 – April 25, 1808	*David Holmes (DR-VA)
2	Claims	1794	7	November 8, 1808 – March 3, 1809	*David Holmes (DR-VA)
3	Commerce and Manufactures	1795	7	October 28, 1807 – April 25, 1808	Thomas Newton, Jr. (DR-VA)
3	Commerce and Manufactures	1795	7	November 8, 1808 – March 3, 1809	Thomas Newton, Jr. (DR-VA)
4	District of Columbia	1808	7	January 27, 1808 – April 25, 1808	Philip B. Key (F-MD)
4	District of Columbia	1808	7	November 8, 1808 – March 3, 1809	Joseph Lewis, Jr. (F-VA)
5	Elections	1789	7	October 28, 1807 – April 25, 1808	*William Findley (DR-PA)
5	Elections	1789	7	November 8, 1808 – March 3, 1809	*William Findley (DR-PA)
6	Post Office and Post Roads	1808	17	November 9, 1808-March 3, 1809	John Rhea (DR-TN)
7	Public Lands	1805	7	October 28, 1807 – April 25, 1808	*John Boyle (DR-KY)
7	Public Lands	1805	7	November 8, 1808 – March 3, 1809	Jeremiah Morrow (DR-OH)
8	Revisal and Unfinished Business	1795	3	October 28, 1807 – April 25, 1808	John Clopton (DR-VA)
8	Revisal and Unfinished Business	1795	3	November 8, 1808 – March 3, 1809	John Clopton (DR-VA)
9	Ways and Means	1802	7	October 28, 1807 – April 25, 1808	George W. Campbell (DR-TN)
9	Ways and Means	1802	7	November 8, 1808 – March 3, 1809	George W. Campbell (DR-TN)

== List of representatives by seniority ==
A numerical rank is assigned to each of the 142 members initially elected to the 10th Congress. Other members, who were not the first person elected to a seat but who joined the House during the Congress, are not assigned a number.

Three representatives-elect were not sworn in, as one died and two resigned. The list below includes the representatives-elect (with name in italics), with the seniority they would have held if they had been sworn in.

Party designations used in this article are DR for Democratic-Republican members and F for Federalist representatives. Designations used for service in the first three congresses are (A) for Anti-Administration members and (P) for Pro-Administration representatives.

U.S. House seniority
Rank	Representative	Party	District	Seniority date	Notes
Nine consecutive terms
1	Nathaniel Macon	DR	NC-6	March 4, 1791	(A) Previously served 1791-95 while as a member of the House. Dean of the House.
Eight consecutive terms
2	Philip Van Cortlandt	DR	NY-4	March 4, 1793	(A) Previously served 1793-95 while as a member of the House. Last term while still serving as a member of the House.
Seven consecutive terms
3	Joseph B. Varnum	DR	MA-4	March 4, 1795	Speaker of the House
4	Samuel W. Dana	F	CT-al	January 3, 1797	
Seven non-consecutive terms
5	William Findley	DR	PA-8	March 4, 1803	Previously served (A) 1791-95 and (DR) 1795-99 while as a member of the House. Chairman: Elections.
Six consecutive terms
6	Matthew Clay	DR	VA-14	March 4, 1797	Elected to this Congress: April 1807
7	John Dawson	DR	VA-10	March 4, 1797	Elected to this Congress: April 1807
8	David Holmes	DR	VA-4	March 4, 1797	Elected to this Congress: April 1807. Chairman: Claims. Last term while still serving as a member of the House.
9	Richard Stanford	DR	NC-8	March 4, 1797	
10	Abram Trigg	DR	VA-6	March 4, 1797	Elected to this Congress: April 1807. Last term while still serving as a member of the House.
11	Robert Brown	DR	PA-2	December 4, 1798	
Six non-consecutive terms
12	John Clopton	DR	VA-22	March 4, 1801	Previously served (DR) 1795-99 while still serving as a member of the House. Elected to this Congress: April 1807. Chairman: Revisal and Unfinished Business.
13	John Smilie	DR	PA-9	March 4, 1799	Previously served (A) 1793-95 while as a member of the House.
14	Richard Winn	DR	SC-5	January 24, 1803	Previously served (A) 1793-95 and (DR) 1795-97 while as a member of the House.
Five consecutive terms
15	Willis Alston	DR	NC-2	March 4, 1799	
16	John Davenport	F	CT-al	March 4, 1799	
17	Edwin Gray	DR	VA-19	March 4, 1799	Elected to this Congress: April 1807
18	John Randolph	DR	VA-15	March 4, 1799	Elected to this Congress: April 1807
Five non-consecutive terms
19	David Bard	DR	PA-4	March 4, 1803	Previously served (DR) 1795-99
20	Thomas Blount	DR	NC-3	March 4, 1805	Previously served (A) 1793-95 and (DR) 1795-99 while as a member of the House. Last term while still serving as a member of the House until 12th Congress.
21	James Holland	DR	NC-11	March 4, 1801	Previously served (DR) 1795-97 while as a member of the House.
22	Matthew Lyon	DR	KY-1	March 4, 1803	Previously served (DR-VT) 1797–1801 while as a member of the House.
Four consecutive terms
23	William Butler	DR	SC-2	March 4, 1801	
24	John Campbell	F	MD-1	March 4, 1801	
25	William Helms	DR	NJ-al	March 4, 1801	
26	Thomas Moore	DR	SC-7	March 4, 1801	
27	Thomas Newton, Jr.	DR	VA-20	March 4, 1801	Elected to this Congress: April 1807. Chairman: Commerce and Manufactures.
28	John Smith	DR	VA-3	March 4, 1801	Elected to this Congress: April 1807
29	Henry Southard	DR	NJ-al	March 4, 1801	
30	David Thomas	DR	NY-12	March 4, 1801	Resigned on February 17, 1808, while still serving in the House.
31	Killian K. Van Rensselaer	F	NY-9	March 4, 1801	
32	Richard Cutts	DR	MA-14	June 22, 1801	
33	Benjamin Tallmadge	F	CT-al	September 21, 1801	
Four non-consecutive terms
34	Walter Jones	DR	VA-8	March 4, 1803	Previously served (DR) 1797-99 while as a member of the House. Elected to this Congress: April 1807.
Three consecutive terms
35	William Blackledge	DR	NC-4	March 4, 1803	Last term while still serving as a member of the House until 12th Congress
36	John Boyle	DR	KY-2	March 4, 1803	Chairman: Public Lands (1807–08). Last term while still serving as a member of the House.
37	George W. Campbell	DR	TN-2	March 4, 1803	Elected to this Congress: August 3–4, 1807. Hamilton District. Chairman: Ways and Means. Last term while still serving as a member of the House.
38	Levi Casey	DR	SC-6	March 4, 1803	Died as Representative-elect: February 3, 1807
39	Martin Chittenden	F	VT-4	March 4, 1803	
40	Joseph Clay	DR	PA-1	March 4, 1803	Resigned after March 28, 1808, while still serving as a member of the House.
41	Jacob Crowninshield	DR	MA-2	March 4, 1803	Died on April 15, 1808, while still serving as a member of the House.
42	James Elliot	F	VT-2	March 4, 1803	Last term while still serving as a member of the House.
43	John W. Eppes	DR	VA-16	March 4, 1803	Elected to this Congress: April 1807
44	Peterson Goodwyn	DR	VA-18	March 4, 1803	Elected to this Congress: April 1807
45	John G. Jackson	DR	VA-1	March 4, 1803	Elected to this Congress: April 1807
46	Nehemiah Knight	DR	RI-al	March 4, 1803	Died on June 13, 1808, while still serving as a member of the House.
47	Joseph Lewis, Jr.	F	VA-7	March 4, 1803	Elected to this Congress: April 1807. Chairman: District of Columbia (1808–09).
48	William McCreery	DR	MD-5	March 4, 1803	Last term while still serving as a member of the House.
49	Nicholas R. Moore	DR	MD-5	March 4, 1803	Chairman: Accounts
50	Jeremiah Morrow	DR	OH-al	March 4, 1803	Chairman: Public Lands (1808–09)
51	John Rea	DR	PA-7	March 4, 1803	
52	John Rhea	DR	TN-1	March 4, 1803	Elected to this Congress: August 3–4, 1807. Washington District. Chairman: Post Office and Post Roads.
53	Jacob Richards	DR	PA-1	March 4, 1803	Last term while still serving as a member of the House.
54	Ebenezer Seaver	DR	MA-13	March 4, 1803	
55	James Sloan	DR	NJ-al	March 4, 1803	Last term while serving as a member of the House.
56	William Stedman	F	MA-11	March 4, 1803	
57	Samuel Taggart	F	MA-6	March 4, 1803	
58	Marmaduke Williams	DR	NC-9	March 4, 1803	Last term while still serving as a member of the House.
59	Daniel C. Verplanck	DR	NY-6	October 17, 1803	Last term while still serving as a member of the House.
60	Roger Nelson	DR	MD-4	November 6, 1804	
61	Alexander Wilson	DR	VA-5	December 4, 1804	Elected to this Congress: April 1807. Last term while still serving as a member of the House.
62	George Clinton, Jr.	DR	NY-2/3	February 14, 1805	Last term while still serving as a member of the House.
Three non-consecutive terms
63	William Hoge	DR	PA-10	March 4, 1807	Previously served (DR) October 13, 1801 – October 15, 1804. Last term while still serving as a member of the House.
Two consecutive terms
64	Joseph Barker	DR	MA-7	March 4, 1805	Last term while still serving as a member of the House.
65	Burwell Bassett	DR	VA-12	March 4, 1805	Elected to this Congress: April 1807
66	Barnabas Bidwell	DR	MA-12	March 4, 1805	Resigned, as Representative-elect: July 13, 1807
67	John Blake, Jr.	DR	NY-5	March 4, 1805	Last term while still serving as a member of the House.
68	John Chandler	DR	MA-17	March 4, 1805	Last term while still serving as a member of the House.
69	John Claiborne	DR	VA-17	March 4, 1805	Elected to this Congress: April 1807. Died on October 9, 1808, while still serving in the House.
70	Orchard Cook	DR	MA-16	March 4, 1805	
71	Ezra Darby	DR	NJ-al	March 4, 1805	Died on January 27, 1808, while still serving in the House.
72	William Ely	F	MA-5	March 4, 1805	
73	James Fisk	DR	VT-3	March 4, 1805	Last term while still serving as a member of the House until 12th Congress
74	James M. Garnett	DR	VA-11	March 4, 1805	Elected to this Congress: April 1807. Last term while still serving as a member of the House.
75	Charles Goldsborough	F	MD-8	March 4, 1805	
76	Isaiah L. Green	DR	MA-8	March 4, 1805	Last term while still serving as a member of the House until 12th Congress.
77	James Kelly	F	PA-6	March 4, 1805	Last term while still serving as a member of the House.
78	John Lambert	DR	NJ-al	March 4, 1805	Last term while still serving as a member of the House.
79	Robert Marion	DR	SC-1	March 4, 1805	
80	Josiah Masters	DR	NY-10	March 4, 1805	Last term while serving as a member of the House.
81	John Morrow	DR	VA-2	March 4, 1805	Elected to this Congress: April 1807. Last term while still serving as a member of the House.
82	Jonathan O. Moseley	F	CT-al	March 4, 1805	
83	Gurdon S. Mumford	DR	NY-2/3	March 4, 1805	
84	John Pugh	DR	PA-2	March 4, 1805	Last term while still serving as a member of the House.
85	Josiah Quincy	F	MA-1	March 4, 1805	
86	John Russell	DR	NY-14	March 4, 1805	Last term while still serving as a member of the House.
87	David R. Williams	DR	SC-3	March 4, 1805	Last term while still serving as a member of the House until 12th Congress.
88	Thomas Kenan	DR	NC-5	August 8, 1805	
89	Timothy Pitkin	F	CT-al	September 16, 1805	
90	Lewis B. Sturges	F	CT-al	September 16, 1805	
91	James M. Broom	F	DE-al	October 1, 1805	Resigned as Representative-elect: July 1807
92	Samuel Smith	DR	PA-11	November 7, 1805	
93	Robert Whitehill	DR	PA-4	November 7, 1805	
94	Evan S. Alexander	DR	NC-10	February 24, 1806	Last term while still serving as a member of the House.
95	Dennis Smelt	DR	GA-al	September 1, 1806	
96	William A. Burwell	DR	VA-13	December 1, 1806	Elected to this Congress: April 1807
097	Edward Lloyd	DR	MD-7	December 3, 1806	Last term while still serving as a member of the House.
98	John Porter	DR	PA-1	December 8, 1806	
99	William W. Bibb	DR	GA-al	January 26, 1807	
Two non-consecutive terms
100	John Thompson	DR	NY-11	March 4, 1807	Previously served (DR) 1799–1801 while as a member of the House.
101	Samuel Riker	DR	NY-1	March 4, 1807	Previously served (DR) November 5, 1804-05 while as a member of the House. Last term while still serving as a member of the House.
One term
102	Lemuel J. Alston	DR	SC-8	March 4, 1807	
103	Peter Carleton	DR	NH-al	March 4, 1807	Only term while serving as a member of the House.
104	Epaphroditus Champion	F	CT-al	March 4, 1807	
105	Howell Cobb	DR	GA-al	March 4, 1807	
106	John Culpepper	F	NC-7	March 4, 1807	Seat declared vacant, after election challenge: January 2, 1808. Returned to the House on February 23, 1808.
107	Josiah Dean	DR	MA-9	March 4, 1807	Only term while serving as a member of the House.
108	Joseph Desha	DR	KY-6	March 4, 1807	
109	Daniel M. Durell	DR	NH-al	March 4, 1807	Only term while serving as a member of the House.
110	Meshack Franklin	DR	NC-12	March 4, 1807	
111	Barent Gardenier	F	NY-7	March 4, 1807	
112	Francis Gardner	DR	NH-al	March 4, 1807	Only term while serving as a member of the House.
113	John Harris	DR	NY-17	March 4, 1807	Only term while serving as a member of the House.
114	John Hiester	DR	PA-3	March 4, 1807	Only term while serving as a member of the House.
115	Benjamin Howard	DR	KY-5	March 4, 1807	
116	Reuben Humphrey	DR	NY-16	March 4, 1807	Only term while serving as a member of the House.
117	Daniel Ilsley	DR	MA-15	March 4, 1807	Only term while serving as a member of the House.
118	Robert Jenkins	F	PA-3	March 4, 1807	
119	Richard M. Johnson	DR	KY-4	March 4, 1807	
120	Philip B. Key	F	MD-3	March 4, 1807	Chairman: District of Columbia (1808)
121	William Kirkpatrick	DR	NY-15	March 4, 1807	Only term while serving as a member of the House.
122	Edward S. Livermore	F	MA-3	March 4, 1807	
123	John Love	DR	VA-9	March 4, 1807	Elected to this Congress: April 1807
124	William Milnor	F	PA-2	March 4, 1807	
125	Daniel Montgomery, Jr.	DR	PA-5	March 4, 1807	Only term while serving as a member of the House.
126	John Montgomery	DR	MD-6	March 4, 1807	
127	Thomas Newbold	DR	NJ-al	March 4, 1807	
128	Wilson C. Nicholas	DR	VA-21	March 4, 1807	Elected to this Congress: April 1807
129	Matthias Richards	DR	PA-3	March 4, 1807	
130	John Rowan	DR	KY-3	March 4, 1807	Only term while serving as a member of the House.
131	Lemuel Sawyer	DR	NC-1	March 4, 1807	
132	Jedediah K. Smith	DR	NH-al	March 4, 1807	Only term while serving as a member of the House.
133	Clement Storer	DR	NH-al	March 4, 1807	Only term while serving as a member of the House.
134	Peter Swart	DR	NY-13	March 4, 1807	Only term while serving as a member of the House.
135	John Taylor	DR	SC-4	March 4, 1807	
136	George M. Troup	DR	GA-al	March 4, 1807	
137	Jabez Upham	F	MA-10	March 4, 1807	
138	James I. Van Alen	DR	NY-8	March 4, 1807	Only term while serving as a member of the House.
139	Archibald Van Horne	DR	MD-2	March 4, 1807	
140	Jesse Wharton	DR	TN-3	March 4, 1807	Elected to this Congress: August 3–4, 1807. Mero District. Only term.
141	Isaac Wilbour	DR	RI-al	March 4, 1807	Only term while serving as a member of the House.
142	James Witherell	DR	VT-1	March 4, 1807	Resigned on May 1, 1808, while still serving as a member of the House.
Members joining the House, after the start of the Congress
...	Joseph Calhoun	DR	SC-6	June 2, 1807	Special election: June 1–2, 1807
...	Ezekiel Bacon	DR	MA-12	September 16, 1807	Special election: July 13, 1807
...	Nicholas Van Dyke	F	DE-al	October 6, 1807	Special election
...	Adam Boyd	DR	NJ-al	March 8, 1808	Previously served (DR) 1803-05 while as a member of the House. Special election: March 8–9, 1808.
...	Joseph Story	DR	MA-2	May 23, 1808	Special election: May 4, 1808. Only term while serving as a member of the House.
...	Nathan Wilson	DR	NY-12	June 3, 1808	Special election: April 26–28, 1808. Only term while serving as a member of the House.
...	Samuel Shaw	DR	VT-1	September 6, 1808	Special election
...	Thomas Gholson, Jr.	DR	VA-17	November 7, 1808	Special election: September (8, 12, 26), 1808
...	Richard Jackson, Jr.	F	RI-al	November 11, 1808	Special election: August 30, 1808
...	Benjamin Say	DR	PA-1	November 16, 1808	Special election: October 11, 1808
Non voting members
a	Daniel Clark	-	OL-al	December 1, 1806	Delegate from Orleans Territory. Last term.
b	Benjamin Parke	-	IN-al	December 12, 1806	Delegate from Indiana Territory. Resigned on March 1, 1808.
c	George Poindexter	-	MS-al	March 4, 1807	Delegate from Mississippi Territory
d	Jesse B. Thomas	-	IN-al	October 22, 1808	Delegate from Indiana Territory. Only term.

== See also ==
- 10th United States Congress
- List of United States congressional districts
- List of United States senators in the 10th Congress
