= List of United States representatives in the 9th Congress =

This is a complete list of United States representatives during the 9th United States Congress listed by seniority. For the most part, representatives are ranked by the beginning of their terms in office.

As an historical article, the districts and party affiliations listed reflect those during the 9th Congress (March 4, 1805 – March 3, 1807). Seats and party affiliations on similar lists for other congresses will be different for certain members.

This article describes the criteria for seniority in the House of Representatives and sets out the list of members by seniority. It is prepared on the basis of the interpretation of seniority applied to the House of Representatives in the current congress. In the absence of information to the contrary, it is presumed that the twenty-first-century practice is identical to the seniority customs used during the 9th Congress.

== House seniority ==
Seniority in the House, for representatives with unbroken service, depends on the date on which the members first term began. That date is either the start of the Congress (4 March in odd numbered years, for the era up to and including the 73rd Congress starting in 1933) or the date of a special election during the Congress. Since many members start serving on the same day as others, ranking between them is based on alphabetical order by the last name of the representative.

Representatives in early congresses were often elected after the legal start of the Congress. Such representatives are attributed with unbroken seniority, from the legal start of the congressional term, if they were the first person elected to a seat in a Congress. The date of the election is indicated in a note.

The seniority date is normally taken from the members entry in the Biographical Directory of the United States Congress, except where the date given is the legal start of the Congress and the actual election (for someone who was not the first person elected to the seat in that Congress) was later. The date of election is taken from United States Congressional Elections 1788-1997. In a few instances the latter work provides dates, for the start and end of terms, which correct those in the Biographical Directory.

The Biographical Directory normally uses the date of a special election, as the seniority date. However, mostly in early congresses, the date of the member taking his seat can be the one given. The date of the special election is mentioned in a note to the list below, when that date is not used as the seniority date by the Biographical Directory.

Representatives who returned to the House, after having previously served, are credited with service equal to one less than the total number of terms they served. When a representative has served a prior term of less than two terms (i.e. prior term minus one equals less than one), he is ranked above all others whose service begins on the same day.

== Leadership ==
In this Congress the only formal leader was the speaker of the House. A speakership ballot was held on December 2, 1805, and Nathaniel Macon (DR-NC) was re-elected for a third consecutive term.

== Standing committees ==
The House created its first standing committee, on April 13, 1789. There were five standing committees, listed in the rules initially used by the 9th Congress. On December 17, 1805, the Accounts Committee and a new Public Lands Committee were included in revised rules.

Committees, in this period, were appointed for a session at a time by the speaker.

This list refers to the standing committees of the House in the 9th Congress, the year of establishment as a standing committee, the number of members assigned to the committee and the dates of appointment in each session, the end of the session and its chairman. Chairmen, who were re-appointed after serving in the previous Congress, are indicated by an *.

The first session was December 2, 1805 – April 21, 1806 (141 days) and the second session was December 1, 1806 – March 3, 1807 (93 days).

No.	Committee	From	Members	Appointed	Chairman
1	Accounts	1803 (1805)	3	December 2, 1805 – April 21, 1806	Frederick Conrad (DR-PA)
1	Accounts	1803 (1805)	3	December 1, 1806 – March 3, 1807	Frederick Conrad (DR-PA)
2	Claims	1794	7	December 2, 1805 – April 21, 1806	*John C. Smith (F-CT)
2	Claims	1794	7	December 1, 1806 – March 3, 1807	David Holmes (DR-VA)
3	Commerce and Manufactures	1795	7	December 2, 1805 – April 21, 1806	*Jacob Crowninshield (DR-MA) a
3	Commerce and Manufactures	1795	7	December 1, 1806 – March 3, 1807	*Jacob Crowninshield (DR-MA) a
4	Elections	1789	7	December 2, 1805 – April 21, 1806	*William Findley (DR-PA)
4	Elections	1789	7	December 1, 1806 – March 3, 1807	*William Findley (DR-PA)
5	Public Lands	1805	7	December 7, 1805 – April 21, 1806	Andrew Gregg (DR-PA)
5	Public Lands	1805	7	December 1, 1806 – March 3, 1807	John Boyle (DR-KY)
6	Revisal and Unfinished Business	1795	3	December 2, 1805 – April 2, 1806	*Samuel Tenney (F-NH)
6	Revisal and Unfinished Business	1795	3	December 1, 1806 – March 3, 1807	*Samuel Tenney (F-NH)
7	Ways and Means	1802	7	December 2, 1805 – April 2, 1806	*John Randolph (DR-VA)
7	Ways and Means	1802	7	December 1, 1806 – March 3, 1807	Joseph Clay (DR-PA)

Note:-

- a On January 6, 1807, Crowninshield was absent on leave and the House appointed Gurdon S. Mumford (DR-NY) in his place.

== List of representatives by seniority ==
A numerical rank is assigned to each of the 142 members initially elected to the 9th Congress. Other members, who were not the first person elected to a seat but who joined the House during the Congress, are not assigned a number.

Ten representatives-elect were not sworn in, as two died and eight resigned. The list below includes the representatives-elect (with name in italics), with the seniority they would have held if they had been sworn in.

Party designations used in this article are DR for Democratic-Republican members and F for Federalist representatives. Designations used for service in the first three congresses are (A) for Anti-Administration members and (P) for Pro-Administration representatives.

U.S. House seniority
Rank	Representative	Party	District	Seniority date	Notes
Eight consecutive terms
1	Andrew Gregg	DR	PA-5	March 4, 1791	(A) 1791–95. Chairman: Public Lands (1805–06). Last term while serving in the House.
2	Nathaniel Macon	DR	NC-6	March 4, 1791	(A) 1791–95. Speaker of the House.
Seven consecutive terms
3	Philip Van Cortlandt	DR	NY-4	March 4, 1793	(A) 1793-95
4	Peleg Wadsworth	F	MA-15	March 4, 1793	(P) 1793–95. Last term while serving in the House.
Six consecutive terms
5	Roger Griswold	F	CT-al	March 4, 1795	Resigned as Representative-elect, before Congress convened, in 1805
6	Joseph B. Varnum	DR	MA-4	March 4, 1795	
7	Samuel W. Dana	F	CT-al	January 3, 1797	
Six non-consecutive terms
8	William Findley	DR	PA-8	March 4, 1803	Previously served (A) 1791-95 and (DR) 1795–99. Chairman: Elections.
Five consecutive terms
9	Matthew Clay	DR	VA-14	March 4, 1797	Elected to this Congress: April 1805
10	John Dawson	DR	VA-10	March 4, 1797	Elected to this Congress: April 1805
11	John Fowler	DR	KY-5	March 4, 1797	Last term while serving in the House.
12	John A. Hanna	DR	PA-4	March 4, 1797	Died, as Representative-elect: July 23, 1805
13	David Holmes	DR	VA-4	March 4, 1797	Elected to this Congress: April 1805. Chairman: Claims (1806–07).
14	Richard Stanford	DR	NC-8	March 4, 1797	
15	Abram Trigg	DR	VA-6	March 4, 1797	Elected to this Congress: April 1805
16	Robert Brown	DR	PA-2	December 4, 1798	
Five non-consecutive terms
17	John Clopton	DR	VA-22	March 4, 1801	Previously served (DR) 1795–99. Elected to this Congress: April 1805.
18	James Gillespie	DR	NC-5	March 4, 1803	Previously served (A) 1793-95 and (DR) 1795–99. Died, as Representative-elect: January 11, 1805.
19	John Smilie	DR	PA-9	March 4, 1799	Previously served (A) 1793-95 while serving in the House.
20	Richard Winn	DR	SC-5	January 24, 1803	Previously served (A) 1793-95 and (DR) 1795-97 while serving in the House.
Four consecutive terms
21	Willis Alston	DR	NC-2	March 4, 1799	
22	Phanuel Bishop	DR	MA-9	March 4, 1799	Last term while serving in the House.
23	John Davenport	F	CT-al	March 4, 1799	
24	Edwin Gray	DR	VA-19	March 4, 1799	Elected to this Congress: April 1805
25	Michael Leib	DR	PA-1	March 4, 1799	Resigned: February 14, 1806
26	Joseph H. Nicholson	DR	MD-7	March 4, 1799	Resigned: March 1, 1806
27	John Randolph	DR	VA-15	March 4, 1799	Elected to this Congress: April 1805. Chairman: Ways and Means (1805–06).
28	John C. Smith	F	CT-al	November 17, 1800	Chairman: Claims (1805–06). Resigned: August 1806.
29	Samuel Tenney	F	NH-al	December 8, 1800	Chairman: Revisal and Unfinished Business. Last term while serving in the House.
Four non-consecutive terms
30	David Bard	DR	PA-4	March 4, 1803	Previously served (DR) 1795-99 while serving in the House.
31	James A. Bayard	F	DE-al	March 4, 1805	Previously served (F) 1797–1803. Resigned, as Representative-elect, in 1804, to become US Senator.
32	Thomas Blount	DR	NC-3	March 4, 1805	Previously served (A) 1793-95 and (DR) 1795-99 while serving in the House.
33	James Holland	DR	NC-11	March 4, 1801	Previously served (DR) 1795-97 while serving in the House.
34	Matthew Lyon	DR	KY-1	March 4, 1803	Previously served (DR-VT) 1797–1801 while serving in the House.
Three consecutive terms
35	John Archer	DR	MD-6	March 4, 1801	Last term while serving in the House.
36	William Butler	DR	SC-2	March 4, 1801	
37	John Campbell	F	MD-1	March 4, 1801	
38	Ebenezer Elmer	DR	NJ-al	March 4, 1801	Last term while serving in the House.
39	William Helms	DR	NJ-al	March 4, 1801	
40	Samuel L. Mitchill	DR	NY-2/3	March 4, 1801	Resigned, as Representative-elect, to become US Senator: November 22, 1804. Last term until 11th Congress.
41	Thomas Moore	DR	SC-7	March 4, 1801	
42	Thomas Newton, Jr.	DR	VA-20	March 4, 1801	Elected to this Congress: April 1805
43	John Smith	DR	VA-3	March 4, 1801	Elected to this Congress: April 1805
44	Henry Southard	DR	NJ-al	March 4, 1801	
45	Joseph Stanton, Jr.	DR	RI-al	March 4, 1801	Last term while serving in the House.
46	David Thomas	DR	NY-12	March 4, 1801	
47	Philip R. Thompson	DR	VA-9	March 4, 1801	Elected to this Congress: April 1805. Last term while serving in the House.
48	Killian K. Van Rensselaer	F	NY-9	March 4, 1801	
49	Calvin Goddard	F	CT-al	May 14, 1801	Resigned, as Representative-elect, before Congress convened in 1805
50	Richard Cutts	DR	MA-14	June 22, 1801	
51	Seth Hastings	F	MA-10	August 24, 1801	Last term while serving in the House.
52	Benjamin Tallmadge	F	CT-al	September 21, 1801	
53	William Dickson	DR	TN-3	October 30, 1801	Elected to this Congress: August 4–5, 1805. Mero District. Last term while serving in the House.
54	David Meriwether	DR	GA-al	December 6, 1802	Last term while serving in the House.
55	Thomas Wynns	DR	NC-1	December 7, 1802	Last term while serving in the House.
56	Peter Early	DR	GA-al	January 10, 1803	Last term while serving in the House.
Three non-consecutive terms
57	Walter Jones	DR	VA-8	March 4, 1803	Previously served (DR) 1797–99. Elected to this Congress: April 1805.
58	Joseph Winston	DR	NC-12	March 4, 1803	Previously served (A) 1793-95 while serving in the House. Last term while serving in the House.
Two consecutive terms
59	Nathaniel Alexander	DR	NC-10	March 4, 1803	Resigned as Representative-elect, to become governor, November 1805
60	Isaac Anderson	DR	PA-3	March 4, 1803	Last term while serving in the House.
61	George M. Bedinger	DR	KY-6	March 4, 1803	Last term while serving in the House.
62	Silas Betton	F	NH-al	March 4, 1803	Last term while serving in the House.
63	William Blackledge	DR	NC-4	March 4, 1803	
64	John Boyle	DR	KY-2	March 4, 1803	Chairman: Public Lands (1806–07)
65	George W. Campbell	DR	TN-2	March 4, 1803	Elected to this Congress: August 4–5, 1805. Hamilton District.
66	Levi Casey	DR	SC-6	March 4, 1803	Died February 3, 1807, while serving in the House.. Elected to but did not serve in 10th Congress.
67	Martin Chittenden	F	VT-4	March 4, 1803	
68	Joseph Clay	DR	PA-1	March 4, 1803	Chairman: Ways and Means (1806–07).
69	Frederick Conrad	DR	PA-2	March 4, 1803	Chairman: Accounts. Last term while serving in the House.
70	Jacob Crowninshield	DR	MA-2	March 4, 1803	Chairman: Commerce and Manufactures
71	John B. Earle	DR	SC-8	March 4, 1803	Resigned, as Representative-elect: August 1805
72	James Elliot	F	VT-2	March 4, 1803	
73	John W. Eppes	DR	VA-16	March 4, 1803	Elected to this Congress: April 1805
74	Peterson Goodwyn	DR	VA-18	March 4, 1803	Elected to this Congress: April 1805
75	David Hough	F	NH-al	March 4, 1803	Last term while serving in the House.
76	John G. Jackson	DR	VA-1	March 4, 1803	Elected to this Congress: April 1805
77	Nehemiah Knight	DR	RI-al	March 4, 1803	
78	Joseph Lewis, Jr.	F	VA-7	March 4, 1803	Elected to this Congress: April 1805
79	Henry W. Livingston	F	NY-8	March 4, 1803	Last term while serving in the House.
80	John B. C. Lucas	DR	PA-11	March 4, 1803	Resigned, as Representative-elect, before Congress convened in 1805
81	William McCreery	DR	MD-5	March 4, 1803	
82	Nicholas R. Moore	DR	MD-5	March 4, 1803	
83	Jeremiah Morrow	DR	OH-al	March 4, 1803	
84	Gideon Olin	DR	VT-1	March 4, 1803	Last term while serving in the House.
85	Thomas M. Randolph	DR	VA-21	March 4, 1803	Elected to this Congress: April 1805. Last term while serving in the House.
86	John Rea	DR	PA-7	March 4, 1803	
87	John Rhea	DR	TN-1	March 4, 1803	Elected to this Congress: August 4–5, 1805. Washington District.
88	Jacob Richards	DR	PA-1	March 4, 1803	
89	Thomas Sammons	DR	NY-13	March 4, 1803	Last term while serving in the House until 11th Congress.
90	Thomas Sandford	DR	KY-4	March 4, 1803	Last term while serving in the House.
91	Ebenezer Seaver	DR	MA-13	March 4, 1803	
92	James Sloan	DR	NJ-al	March 4, 1803	
93	William Stedman	F	MA-11	March 4, 1803	
94	Samuel Taggart	F	MA-6	March 4, 1803	
95	Matthew Walton	DR	KY-3	March 4, 1803	Last term while serving in the House.
96	John Whitehill	DR	PA-3	March 4, 1803	Last term while serving in the House.
97	Marmaduke Williams	DR	NC-9	March 4, 1803	
98	Joseph Bryan	DR	GA-al	October 3, 1803	Resigned 1806
99	Daniel C. Verplanck	DR	NY-6	October 17, 1803	
100	Christopher H. Clark	DR	VA-13	November 5, 1804	Elected to this Congress: April 1805. Resigned: July 1, 1806.
101	Roger Nelson	DR	MD-4	November 6, 1804	
102	Alexander Wilson	DR	VA-5	December 4, 1804	Elected to this Congress: April 1805
...	George Clinton, Jr.	DR	NY-2/3	February 14, 1805	Special election before this Congress started
One term
103	Joseph Barker	DR	MA-7	March 4, 1805	
104	Burwell Bassett	DR	VA-12	March 4, 1805	Elected to this Congress: April 1805
105	Barnabas Bidwell	DR	MA-12	March 4, 1805	
106	John Blake, Jr.	DR	NY-5	March 4, 1805	
107	John Chandler	DR	MA-17	March 4, 1805	
108	John Claiborne	DR	VA-17	March 4, 1805	Elected to this Congress: April 1805
109	Orchard Cook	DR	MA-16	March 4, 1805	
110	Leonard Covington	DR	MD-2	March 4, 1805	Only term while serving in the House.
111	Ezra Darby	DR	NJ-al	March 4, 1805	
112	Caleb Ellis	F	NH-al	March 4, 1805	Only term while serving in the House.
113	William Ely	F	MA-5	March 4, 1805	
114	James Fisk	DR	VT-3	March 4, 1805	Elected to this Congress: March 25, 1805
115	James M. Garnett	DR	VA-11	March 4, 1805	Elected to this Congress: April 1805
116	Charles Goldsborough	F	MD-8	March 4, 1805	
117	Isaiah L. Green	DR	MA-8	March 4, 1805	
118	Silas Halsey	DR	NY-17	March 4, 1805	Only term while serving in the House.
119	John Hamilton	DR	PA-10	March 4, 1805	Only term while serving in the House.
120	James Kelly	F	PA-6	March 4, 1805	
121	John Lambert	DR	NJ-al	March 4, 1805	
122	Christian Lower	DR	PA-3	March 4, 1805	Died December 19, 1806, while serving in the House.
123	Patrick Magruder	DR	MD-3	March 4, 1805	Only term while serving in the House.
124	Robert Marion	DR	SC-1	March 4, 1805	
125	Josiah Masters	DR	NY-10	March 4, 1805	
126	Duncan McFarlan	DR	NC-7	March 4, 1805	Only term while serving in the House.
127	Cowles Mead	DR	GA-al	March 4, 1805	Unseated after election challenge: December 24, 1805
128	John Morrow	DR	VA-2	March 4, 1805	Elected to this Congress: April 1805
129	Jonathan O. Moseley	F	CT-al	March 4, 1805	
...	Gurdon S. Mumford	DR	NY-2/3	March 4, 1805	Special election, before this Congress started
130	Jeremiah Nelson	F	MA-3	March 4, 1805	Only term until 14th Congress
131	John Pugh	DR	PA-2	March 4, 1805	
132	Josiah Quincy	F	MA-1	March 4, 1805	
133	John Russell	DR	NY-14	March 4, 1805	
134	Peter Sailly	DR	NY-11	March 4, 1805	Only term while serving in the House.
135	Martin G. Schuneman	DR	NY-7	March 4, 1805	Only term while serving in the House.
136	O'Brien Smith	DR	SC-4	March 4, 1805	Only term while serving in the House.
137	Thomas W. Thompson	F	NH-al	March 4, 1805	Only term while serving in the House.
138	Daniel D. Tompkins	DR	NY-2/3	March 4, 1805	Resigned, as Representative-elect, before the Congress started: July 2, 1804
139	Uri Tracy	DR	NY-16	March 4, 1805	Only term while serving in the House until 11th Congress.
140	Eliphalet Wickes	DR	NY-1	March 4, 1805	Only term while serving in the House.
141	David R. Williams	DR	SC-3	March 4, 1805	
142	Nathan Williams	DR	NY-15	March 4, 1805	Only term while serving in the House.
Members joining the House, after the start of the Congress
...	Thomas Kenan	DR	NC-5	August 8, 1805	Special election
...	Timothy Pitkin	F	CT-al	September 16, 1805	Special election
...	Lewis B. Sturges	F	CT-al	September 16, 1805	Special election
...	James M. Broom	F	DE-al	October 1, 1805	Special election
...	Samuel Smith	DR	PA-11	November 7, 1805	Special election: October 8, 1805
...	Robert Whitehill	DR	PA-4	November 7, 1805	Special election: October 8, 1805
...	Thomas Spalding	DR	GA-al	December 24, 1805	Seated after election contest. Resigned 1806.
...	Evan S. Alexander	DR	NC-10	February 24, 1806	Special election: January 23–24, 1806
...	Dennis Smelt	DR	GA-al	September 1, 1806	Special election
...	Elias Earle	DR	SC-8	September 27, 1806	Special election: September 26–27, 1806. Only term until 12th Congress.
...	William A. Burwell	DR	VA-13	December 1, 1806	Special election: November 1806
...	Theodore Dwight	F	CT-al	December 1, 1806	Special election: September 15, 1806. Only term while serving in the House.
...	Edward Lloyd	DR	MD-7	December 3, 1806	Special election: September 27 and October 4, 1806
...	John Porter	DR	PA-1	December 8, 1806	Special election: November 27, 1806
...	William W. Bibb	DR	GA-al	January 26, 1807	Special election: December 1, 1806
Non voting member
a	William Lattimore	-	MS-al	March 4, 1803	Delegate from Mississippi Territory. Last term while serving in the House until 13th Congress.
b	Daniel Clark	-	OL-al	December 1, 1806	Delegate from Orleans Territory
c	Benjamin Parke	-	IN-al	December 12, 1806	Delegate from Indiana Territory

== See also ==
- 9th United States Congress
- List of United States congressional districts
- List of United States senators in the 9th Congress
