= 1820–21 United States Senate election in Pennsylvania =

The 1820–1821 United States Senate election in Pennsylvania was held on three separate dates from December 1820 to December 1821. On December 10, 1821, William Findlay was elected by the Pennsylvania General Assembly to the United States Senate.

== Results ==
The Pennsylvania General Assembly, consisting of the House of Representatives and the Senate, convened on December 12, 1820, for the regularly scheduled Senate election for the term beginning on March 4, 1821. Two ballots were recorded on December 12. The election convention re-convened on January 16, 1821, when three ballots were recorded with no result, after which the convention adjourned sine die. Upon the expiration of incumbent Jonathan Roberts's term on March 4, 1821, the seat was vacated. It was vacant until the nomination convention of the General Assembly re-convened on December 10, 1821, and elected Democratic-Republican William Findlay to the seat. The results of the sixth and final ballot of both houses combined are as follows:

State legislature results
Party	Candidate	Votes	%
Democratic-Republican	William Findlay	83	65.87
Federalist	Isaac Wayne	18	14.29
Federalist	John Sergeant	7	5.56
Federalist	Samuel Sitgreaves	5	3.97
Democratic-Republican	George Bryan	3	2.38
Democratic-Republican	Molton Rogers	3	2.38
Democratic-Republican	William P. Maclay	2	1.59
Democratic-Republican	William Darlington	1	0.79
Federalist	Samuel Breck	1	0.79
N/A	Not voting	3	2.38
Totals		126	100.00%

== See also ==
- 1820–21 United States Senate elections

Preceded by 1814	Pennsylvania U.S. Senate election (Class I); 1820-21	Succeeded by 1826
