= List of United States senators in the 10th Congress =

This is a complete list of United States senators during the 10th United States Congress listed by seniority from March 4, 1807, to March 3, 1809.

Order of service is based on the commencement of the senator's first term. Behind this is former service as a senator (only giving the senator seniority within their new incoming class), service as vice president, a House member, a cabinet secretary, or a governor of a state. The final factor is the population of the senator's state.

The two main parties at this point were the Federalists (F), and Democratic Republicans (DR)

== Terms of service ==
Class	Terms of service of senators that expired in years
Class 1	Terms of service of senators that expired in 1809 (CT, DE, MA, MD, NJ, NY, OH, PA, RI, TN, VA, and VT.)
Class 2	Terms of service of senators that expired in 1811 (DE, GA, KY, MA, NC, NH, NJ, RI, SC, and VA.)
Class 3	Terms of service of senators that expired in 1813 (CT, GA, KY, MD, NC, NH, NY, OH, PA, SC, TN, and VT.)

== U.S. Senate seniority list ==
U.S. Senate seniority
Rank	Senator (party-state)	Seniority date	Other factors
1	Uriah Tracy (F-CT)	October 13, 1796	
2	James Hillhouse (F-CT)	December 6, 1796	
3	Joseph Inslee Anderson (DR-TN)	September 26, 1797	
4	Abraham Baldwin (DR-GA)	March 4, 1799	
5	Samuel White (F-DE)	February 28, 1801	
6	Stephen Row Bradley (DR-VT)	October 15, 1801	
7	Thomas Sumter (DR-SC)	December 16, 1801	
8	Samuel Smith (DR-MD)	March 4, 1803	Former representative (10 years)
9	Israel Smith (DR-VT)	March 4, 1803	Former representative (8 years)
10	Samuel Maclay (DR-PA)	March 4, 1803	Former representative (2 years)
11	Timothy Pickering (F-MA)	March 4, 1803	Former cabinet member
12	John Quincy Adams (F-MA)	March 4, 1803	
13	John Smith (DR-OH)	April 1, 1803	
14	John Condit (DR-NJ)	September 1, 1803	
15	John Smith (DR-NY)	February 23, 1804	
16	William Branch Giles (DR-VA)	August 11, 1804	Former representative (9 years, 10 months)
17	Andrew Moore (DR-VA)	August 11, 1804	Former representative (9 years, 6 months)
18	Benjamin Howland (DR-RI)	October 29, 1804	
19	James Asheton Bayard, Sr. (F-DE)	November 13, 1804	
20	Samuel Latham Mitchill (DR-NY)	November 23, 1804	
21	John Gaillard (DR-SC)	December 6, 1804	
22	Daniel Smith (DR-TN)	March 4, 1805	Former senator
23	Nicholas Gilman (DR-NH)	March 4, 1805	Former representative (8 years)
24	Aaron Kitchell (DR-NJ)	March 4, 1805	Former representative (6 years)
25	James Turner (DR-NC)	March 4, 1805	Former governor
26	Buckner Thruston (DR-KY)	March 4, 1805	Kentucky 9th in population (1800)
27	James Fenner (DR-RI)	March 4, 1805	Rhode Island 15th in population (1800)
28	John Milledge (DR-GA)	June 19, 1806	
29	Philip Reed (DR-KY)	November 25, 1806	
30	Jesse Franklin (DR-NC)	March 4, 1807	Former senator
31	Andrew Gregg (DR-PA)	March 4, 1807	Former representative
32	Edward Tiffin (DR-OH)	March 4, 1807	Former governor
33	John Pope (DR-KY)	March 4, 1807	Kentucky 9th in population (1800)
34	Nahum Parker (DR-NH)	March 4, 1807	New Hampshire 11th in population (1800)
35	George Jones (DR-GA)	August 27, 1807	
36	Jonathan Robinson (DR-VT)	October 10, 1807	
37	Chauncey Goodrich (F-CT)	October 25, 1807	
38	Elisha Mathewson (DR-RI)	October 26, 1807	
39	William Harris Crawford (DR-GA)	November 7, 1807	
40	James Lloyd (F-MA)	June 9, 1808	
41	Return Jonathan Meigs Jr. (DR-OH)	December 12, 1808	
42	Michael Leib (DR-PA)	January 9, 1809	

== See also ==
- 10th United States Congress
- List of United States representatives in the 10th Congress
