= Senator Ruggles =

Senator Ruggles may refer to:

- Benjamin Ruggles (1783–1857), U.S. Senator from Ohio from 1815 to 1833
- John Ruggles (1789–1874), U.S. Senator from Maine from 1835 to 1841
