= 1814 United States Senate special election in Pennsylvania =

The 1814 United States Senate special election in Pennsylvania was held February 24, 1814. Jonathan Roberts was elected by the Pennsylvania General Assembly to the United States Senate.

== Background ==
The Democratic-Republican Michael Leib was elected to the United States Senate by the General Assembly, consisting of the House of Representatives and the Senate, in December 1808. Sen. Leib resigned on February 14, 1814, to become postmaster of Philadelphia.

== Results ==
Following the resignation of Sen. Michael Leib, the Pennsylvania General Assembly convened on February 24, 1814, to elect a new senator to fill the vacancy. The results of the vote of both houses combined are as follows:

State legislature results
Party	Candidate	Votes	%
Democratic-Republican	Jonathan Roberts	82	65.08
Democratic-Republican	Thomas Sergeant	23	18.25
Federalist	Horace Binney	8	6.35
Federalist	John Steele	1	0.79
Democratic-Republican	Horatio Gates Jones	1	0.79
Federalist	Isaac Wayne	1	0.79
N/A	Not voting	10	7.94
Totals		126	100.00%

== See also ==
- 1814–15 United States Senate elections

Preceded by 1808	Pennsylvania U.S. Senate election (Class I); 1814	Succeeded by Dec. 1814
