= 1814 United States Senate election in Pennsylvania =

The 1814 United States Senate election in Pennsylvania was held on December 10, 1814. Incumbent Jonathan Roberts was elected by the Pennsylvania General Assembly to the United States Senate.

== Background ==
After the resignation of Democratic-Republican Sen. Michael Leib in February 1814, fellow Democratic-Republican Jonathan Roberts was elected by the General Assembly in a special election to fill the vacancy and serve out the term ending on March 4, 1815. This election, held in December 1814, was the regularly scheduled election to elect a Senator to serve the term beginning upon the expiration of the previous term.

== Results ==
The Pennsylvania General Assembly, consisting of the House of Representatives and the Senate, convened on December 10, 1814, to elect a senator to serve the term beginning on March 4, 1815. The results of the vote of both houses combined are as follows:

State legislature results
Party	Candidate	Votes	%
Democratic-Republican	Jonathan Roberts (Inc.)	84	66.67
Federalist	Samuel Sitgreaves	32	25.40
Federalist	Jared Ingersoll	1	0.79
N/A	Not voting	9	7.14
Totals		126	100.00%

== See also ==
- 1814–15 United States Senate elections

Preceded by Feb. 1814	Pennsylvania U.S. Senate election (Class I); 1814	Succeeded by 1820-21
