= USS William Jones =

Clemson-class destroyer

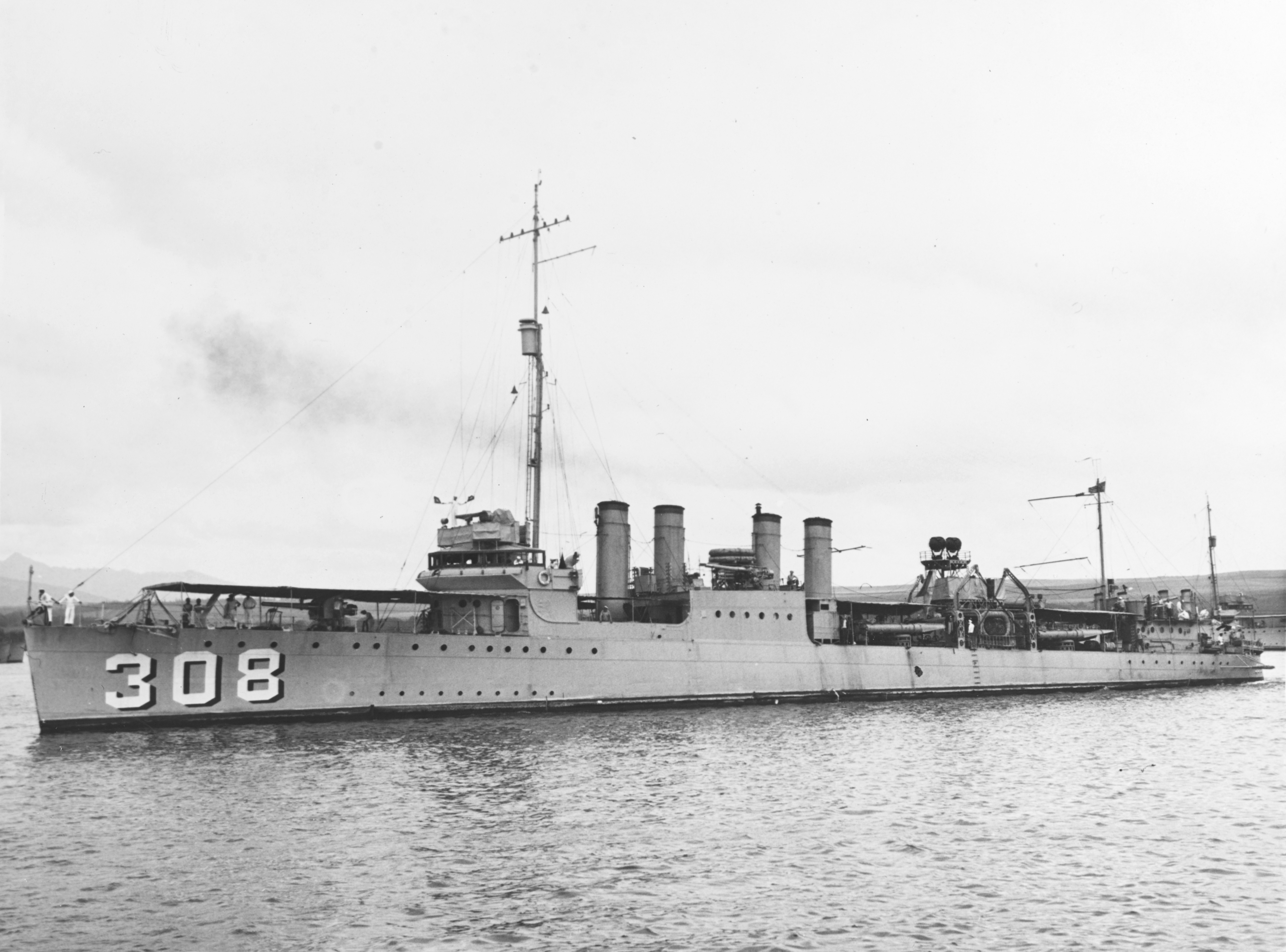
- USS William Jones

History

United States
- Namesake: William Jones
- Builder: Bethlehem Shipbuilding Corporation, Union Iron Works, San Francisco
- Laid down: 2 October 1918
- Launched: 6 April 1919
- Commissioned: 30 September 1920
- Decommissioned: 24 May 1930
- Stricken: 13 August 1930
- Fate: Sold for scrap, 25 February 1932

General characteristics
- Class & type: Clemson-class destroyer
- Displacement: 1,215 tons
- Length: 314 ft 4 1/2 in (95.8 m)
- Beam: 30 ft 11 1/4 in (9.430 m)
- Draft: 9 ft 4 in (2.84 m)
- Propulsion: 26,500 shp (20 MW); geared turbines, 2 screws
- Speed: 35 kn (65 km/h)
- Range: 4,900 nmi (9,100 km); @ 15-knot (28 km/h)
- Complement: 122 officers and enlisted
- Armament: 4 × 4 in (100 mm) guns, 1 × 3 in (76 mm) gun, 12 × 21 inch (533 mm) torpedo tubes

USS William Jones (DD-308), a Clemson-class destroyer in the United States Navy, named for William Jones.

== History ==
William Jones was laid down on 2 October 1918, at San Francisco, California, by the Bethlehem Steel Corporation. She was launched on 9 April 1919, sponsored by Mrs. Ernest P. McRitchie, the wife of the assistant naval architect at Bethlehem Shipbuilding Corporation, and was commissioned at the Mare Island Naval Shipyard, Vallejo, California, on 30 September 1920.

Initially assigned to Division 34, Squadron 12, Destroyer Force, Pacific Fleet, William Jones operated off the west coast on duty in connection with the Officers' Engineering School until October 1921, cruising as far north as Seattle, Washington and as far south as the waters off the Panama Canal Zone. Assigned to Destroyer Squadrons, Battle Fleet, early in 1922, the destroyer operated with this force over the next seven years. Her operations took the ship up and down the west coast from Puget Sound to the Panama Canal. She took part in fleet maneuvers, exercises in torpedo firing and gunnery, and battle practices. In March 1925, she joined the Fleet for Fleet Problem V during which she screened the Battle Fleet units off Baja California, as they carried out maneuvers designed to practice protective screening, seizing and occupying a lightly defended position, and fueling at sea.

Later that summer, William Jones served as one of the ships plane-guarding for the PN-9 flying boat flight to Hawaii. None of the planes actually flew all the way to Hawaii due a variety of mishaps. One, PN-9 number 3, was forced down by a malfunctioning fuel line. William Jones located her and went to her assistance, later towing her into San Francisco harbor on 1 September. PN-9 number 1, flown by Commander John Rodgers, did eventually reach Hawaii after a remarkable voyage in which her enterprising crew stripped the fabric from one wing and used it to fabricate a sail which propelled the floating aircraft to Oahu.

From 5 September to 15 September, William Jones participated in the Diamond Jubilee celebrations at San Francisco before resuming her operations and exercises off the west coast. She worked along the Pacific coast until 3 March and 4 March 1926, when she transited the Panama Canal to take part in maneuvers with the Fleet in the Atlantic Ocean. She visited a succession of east coast ports and returned to the west coast on 30 June, when she moored again at San Diego, California.

William Jones conducted a reserve training cruise to Alaskan waters from 7 July to 21 July 1928, pausing at Ketchikan, Juneau, and Sitka. After the ship's return to San Diego, she participated in tactical exercises off Point Loma and, later, in joint Army-Navy maneuvers off Port Angeles, Washington, in July 1929.

== Fate ==
Upon the conclusion of the joint exercises, the destroyer arrived at San Diego late in August 1929 and remained inactive there until decommissioned on 24 May 1930. In accordance with the London treaty for the limitation and reduction of naval armaments, the warship was struck from the Navy list on 13 August 1930 and sold for scrap on 25 February 1932.
