= List of United States senators in the 9th Congress =

This is a complete list of United States senators during the 9th United States Congress listed by seniority from March 4, 1805, to March 3, 1807.

he order of service is based on the commencement of the senator's first term, with senators entering service the same day ranked alphabetically.

The two main parties in the 9th Congress were the Federalists (F), and Democratic Republicans (DR).

== Terms of service ==
Class	Terms of service of senators that expired in years
Class 3	Terms of service of senators that expired in 1807 (CT, GA, KY, MD, NC, NH, NY, OH, PA, SC, and VT.)
Class 1	Terms of service of senators that expired in 1809 (CT, DE, MA, MD, NJ, NY, OH, PA, RI, TN, VA, and VT)
Class 2	Terms of service of senators that expired in 1811 (DE, GA, KY, MA, NC, NH, NJ, RI, SC, TN, and VA.)

== U.S. Senate seniority list ==
U.S. Senate seniority
Rank	Senator (party-state)	Seniority date
1	Uriah Tracy (F-CT)	October 13, 1796
2	James Hillhouse (F-CT)	December 6, 1796
3	Joseph Inslee Anderson (DR-TN)	September 26, 1797
4	Abraham Baldwin (DR-GA)	March 4, 1799
5	Samuel White (F-DE)	February 28, 1801
6	John Breckinridge (DR-KY)	March 4, 1801
7	James Jackson (DR-GA)	March 4, 1801
8	David Stone (DR-NC)	March 4, 1801
9	George Logan (DR-PA)	July 13, 1801
10	Stephen Row Bradley (DR-VT)	October 15, 1801
11	Robert Wright (DR-MD)	November 19, 1801
12	Thomas Sumter (DR-SC)	December 16, 1801
13	William Plumer (F-NH)	June 17, 1802
14	John Quincy Adams (F-MA)	March 4, 1803
15	Samuel Maclay (DR-PA)	March 4, 1803
16	Timothy Pickering (F-MA)	March 4, 1803
17	Israel Smith (DR-VT)	March 4, 1803
18	Samuel Smith (DR-MD)	March 4, 1803
19	John Smith (DR-OH)	April 1, 1803
20	Thomas Worthington (DR-OH)	April 1, 1803
21	John Condit (DR-NJ)	September 1, 1803
22	John Smith (DR-NY)	February 23, 1804
23	William Branch Giles (DR-VA)	August 11, 1804
24	Andrew Moore (DR-VA)	August 11, 1804
25	Benjamin Howland (DR-RI)	October 29, 1804
26	James Asheton Bayard, Sr. (F-DE)	November 9, 1804
27	Samuel Latham Mitchill (DR-NY)	November 13, 1804
28	John Gaillard (DR-SC)	December 6, 1804
29	James Fenner (DR-RI)	March 4, 1805
30	Nicholas Gilman (DR-NH)	March 4, 1805
31	Aaron Kitchell (DR-NJ)	March 4, 1805
32	Daniel Smith (DR-TN)	March 4, 1805
33	Buckner Thruston (DR-KY)	March 4, 1805
34	James Turner (DR-NC)	March 4, 1805
35	John Adair (DR-KY)	November 8, 1805
36	John Milledge (DR-GA)	June 19, 1806
37	Philip Reed (DR-KY)	November 25, 1806
38	Henry Clay (DR-KY)	December 29, 1806

== See also ==
- 9th United States Congress
- List of United States representatives in the 9th Congress
