= William Jones (statesman) =

American politician (1760–1831)

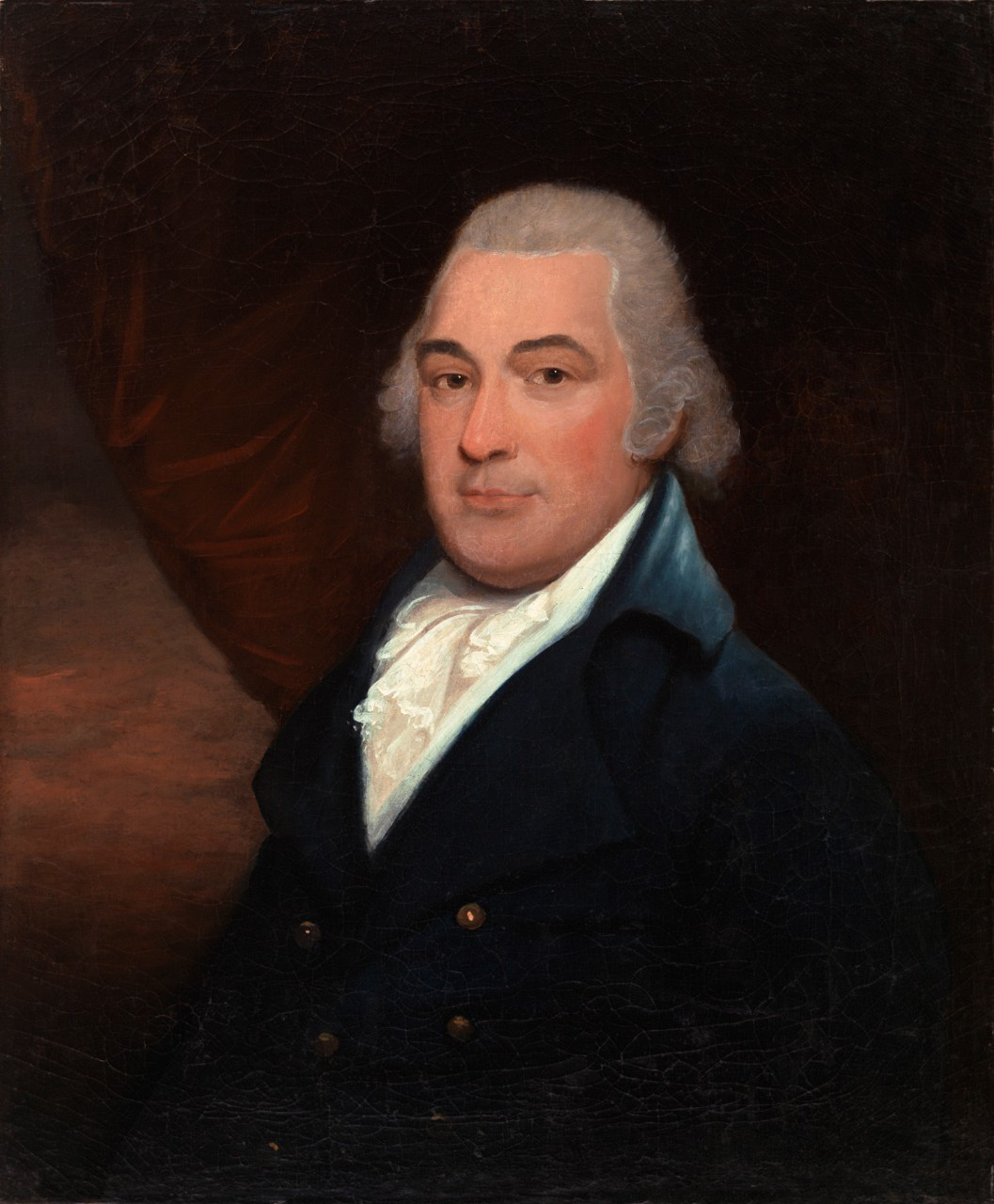

President of the Second Bank of the United States
- In office January 7, 1817 – January 25, 1819
- President: James Madison; James Monroe
- Preceded by: Position established
- Succeeded by: James Fisher (Acting)

United States Secretary of the Treasury
- Acting; May 9, 1813 – February 8, 1814
- President: James Madison
- Preceded by: Albert Gallatin
- Succeeded by: George W. Campbell

4th United States Secretary of the Navy
- In office January 19, 1813 – December 1, 1814
- President: James Madison
- Preceded by: Paul Hamilton
- Succeeded by: Benjamin Crowninshield

Member of the U.S. House of Representatives from Pennsylvania's 1st district
- In office March 4, 1801 – March 3, 1803
- Preceded by: Robert Waln
- Succeeded by: Constituency abolished

Personal details
- Born: 1760 Philadelphia, Province of Pennsylvania, British America
- Died: September 6, 1831 (aged 70–71) Bethlehem, Pennsylvania, U.S.
- Party: Democratic-Republican

Military service
- Allegiance: United States
- Branch/service: Continental Army
- Battles/wars: American Revolutionary War

William Jones (1760 – September 6, 1831) was an American politician.

== Early career ==
Jones was born in Philadelphia in the Province of Pennsylvania. Apprenticed in a shipyard, during the American Revolutionary War, he saw combat in the battles of Trenton and Princeton and later served at sea. In the decades that followed the war, he was a successful merchant in Charleston, South Carolina, and in Philadelphia. He was elected as a Republican to the United States House of Representatives in 1800 and was offered the office of Secretary of the Navy in 1801, but declined and remained in Congress to the end of his term in 1803. In 1805, he was elected as a member of the American Philosophical Society.

== Secretary of the Navy ==
With the War of 1812 raging, Jones became Secretary of the Navy in January 1813. His policies contributed greatly to American success on the Great Lakes and to a strategy of coastal defense and commerce raiding on the high seas. In late 1814, near the end of his term, he made recommendations on the reorganization of the Navy Department. These led to the establishment of the Board of Commissioners system which operated from 1815 until 1842.

== Bank president ==
From May 1813 to February 1814, Jones also served as acting Secretary of the Treasury and in 1816 was appointed President of the Second Bank of the United States. He returned to commercial pursuits in 1819. Jones died in Bethlehem, Pennsylvania.

== Legacy ==
The destroyer USS William Jones (DD-308) was named in his honor.

U.S. House of Representatives
Preceded by Robert Waln	Member of the U.S. House of Representatives from Pennsylvania's 1st congressional district 1801–1803	Succeeded by Joseph Clay, Michael Leib, and Jacob Richards
Government offices
Preceded by Paul Hamilton	United States Secretary of the Navy; 1813–1814	Succeeded by Benjamin Williams Crowninshield
Business positions
Preceded by bank established	President of the Second Bank of the United States; 1817–1819	Succeeded by James Fisher; Acting
