= 1808 United States Senate election in Pennsylvania =

The 1808 United States Senate election in Pennsylvania was held on December 13, 1808. Michael Leib was elected by the Pennsylvania General Assembly to the United States Senate.

== Results ==
Incumbent Democratic-Republican Senator Samuel Maclay, who was elected in 1802, was not a candidate for re-election to a second term. The Pennsylvania General Assembly, consisting of the House of Representatives and the Senate, convened on December 13, 1808, to elect a new senator to fill the term beginning on March 4, 1809. The results of the vote of both houses combined are as follows:

State legislature results
Party	Candidate	Votes	%
Democratic-Republican	Michael Leib	90	71.43
Federalist	Joseph Hemphill	24	19.05
Constitutional	John D. Coxe	11	8.73
N/A	Not voting	1	0.79
Totals		126	100.00%

Although Leib's regular term did not begin until March 4, 1809, Leib assumed office in January 1809 following the resignation of his predecessor, Samuel Maclay. He subsequently served out the remainder of Sen. Maclay's term until his own term began in March 1809.

== See also ==
- 1808–09 United States Senate elections

Preceded by 1802	Pennsylvania U.S. Senate election (Class I); 1808	Succeeded by 1814
