= Joseph Kerr =

American politician (1765-1837)

United States Senator from Ohio
- In office December 10, 1814 – March 3, 1815
- Preceded by: Thomas Worthington
- Succeeded by: Benjamin Ruggles

Member of the Ohio Senate from Ross and Franklin counties
- In office 1804–1806
- Preceded by: Abraham Claypool; Nathaniel Massie
- Succeeded by: Abraham Claypool; Duncan McArthur

Member of the Ohio House of Representatives from Ross County
- In office 1818–1820
- Preceded by: Duncan McArthur; James Manary; William Vance
- Succeeded by: John Bailhache; John Entrekin; William Vance

Member of the Ohio House of Representatives from Ross County
- In office 1808–1809
- Preceded by: New district
- Succeeded by: James Dunlap; Joseph Gardner; Nathaniel Massie; David Shelby; Edward Tiffin

Personal details
- Born: 1765 Chambersburg, Pennsylvania
- Died: August 22, 1837 (aged 71–72) East Carroll Parish, Louisiana, US
- Party: Democratic-Republican

Joseph Kerr (1765 – August 22, 1837) was a Democratic-Republican politician from Ohio who served in the United States Senate.

== Biography ==
Kerr (pronounced "car") was born in Kerrtown, Pennsylvania (now Chambersburg), and moved to Ohio in 1792. He served in a number of positions as clerk, surveyor, judge and justice of the peace in the Northwest Territory.

He served as justice of the peace at Manchester, Adams County, Ohio in 1797. and as a judge of the first quarter session court of Adams County, Northwest Territory, in 1797.

Kerr's son, Joseph Kerr Jr., died in the Battle of the Alamo.

== Career ==
After statehood was declared, Kerr was elected to the Ohio House of Representatives in 1808, 1816, 1818, and 1819. He was elected to the Ohio State Senate in 1804 and 1810. He also served as a brigadier general of Ohio Volunteers during the War of 1812, in charge of supplying provisions to the Army of the Northwest.

Kerr was elected to the U.S. Senate in 1814 to fill a vacancy created by the resignation of Thomas Worthington. Kerr served from December 10, 1814, to March 3, 1815, and did not seek re-election.

== Death ==
Kerr's extensive farm went bankrupt in 1826, and he moved to Memphis, Tennessee and then to rural Louisiana, where he purchased a homestead near Lake Providence. He died on August 22, 1837.

Ohio Senate
Preceded by Abraham Claypool; Nathaniel Massie	Senator from Ross and Franklin Counties; 1804–1806; Served alongside: Abraham Claypool (1804–1805); Duncan McArthur (1805–1806)	Succeeded by Abraham Claypool; Duncan McArthur as Senators from Ross, Franklin, and Highland Counties
Ohio House of Representatives
New district	Representative from Ross County; 1808–1809; Served alongside: Jessup Nash Couch, James Dunlap, Samuel Monnett, David Shelby	Succeeded by James Dunlap; Joseph Gardner; Nathaniel Massie; David Shelby; Edward Tiffin
Preceded by Duncan McArthur; James Manary; William Vance	Representative from Ross County; 1818–1820; Served alongside: 1818–1819: John Sill, James S. Swearingen; 1819–1820: Isaac Cook, Samuel Tizzard	Succeeded by John Bailhache; John Entrekin; William Vance
U.S. Senate
Preceded by Thomas Worthington	U.S. senator (Class 1) from Ohio; 1814–1815; Served alongside: Jeremiah Morrow	Succeeded by Benjamin Ruggles
Military offices
Preceded by Thomas Worthington	Adjutant General of Ohio; 1809–1810	Succeeded by Isaac Van Horne
