= 1809 Connecticut lieutenant gubernatorial election =

- April 10, 1809
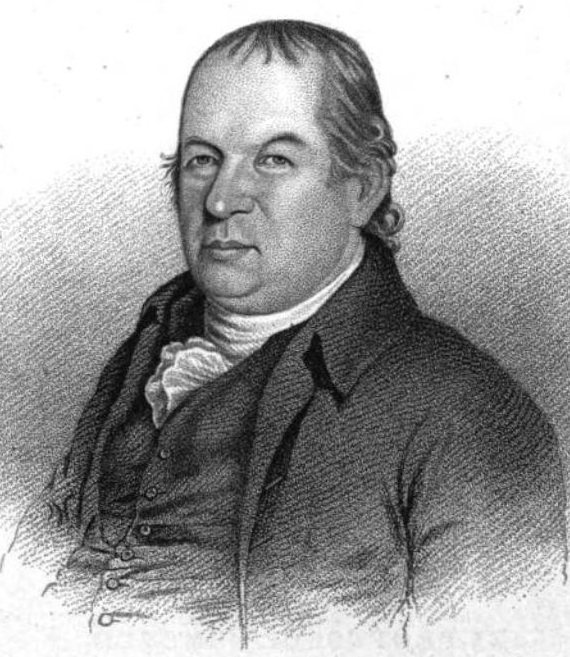

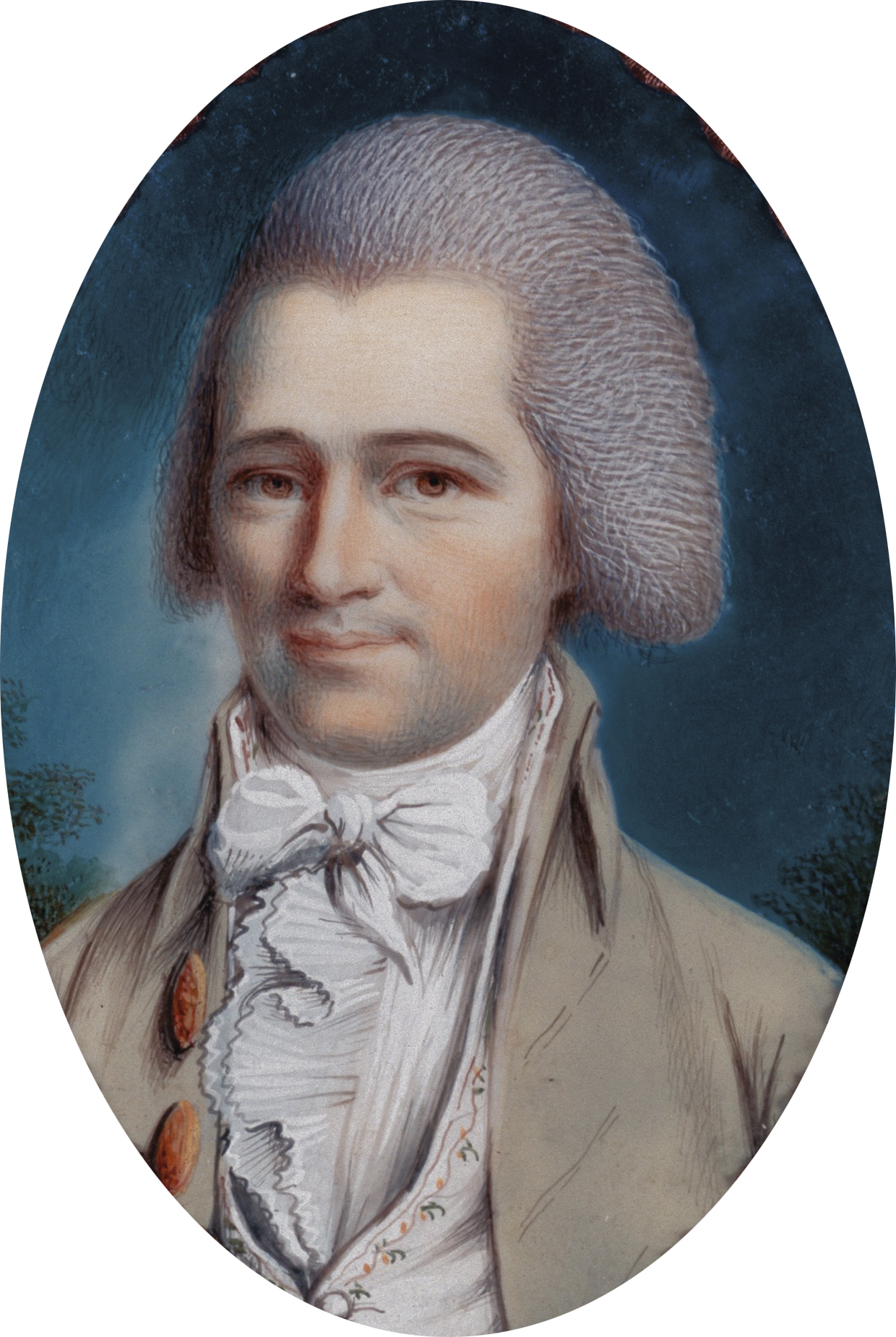
Nominee	John Treadwell	Elijah Boardman
Party	Federalist	Democratic-Republican
Popular vote	12,794	6,880
Percentage	64.40%	34.60%
Lieutenant Governor before election
John Treadwell
Federalist
Elected Lieutenant Governor
John Treadwell
Federalist

The 1809 Connecticut lieutenant gubernatorial election was held on April 10, 1809, in order to elect the lieutenant governor of Connecticut. Incumbent Federalist lieutenant governor John Treadwell defeated Democratic-Republican candidate Elijah Boardman.

== General election ==
On election day, April 10, 1809, incumbent Federalist lieutenant governor John Treadwell won re-election by a margin of 6,114 votes against his opponent Democratic-Republican candidate Elijah Boardman, thereby retaining Federalist control over the office of lieutenant governor. Treadwell was sworn in for his twelfth term on May 11, 1809.

=== Results ===
Connecticut lieutenant gubernatorial election, 1809
Party	Candidate	Votes	%
Federalist	John Treadwell (incumbent)	12,794	64.40
Democratic-Republican	Elijah Boardman	6,680	34.60
	Scattering	198	1.00
Total votes		19,872	100.00
Federalist hold			
