= June 1809 Maryland gubernatorial election =

- June 5, 1809
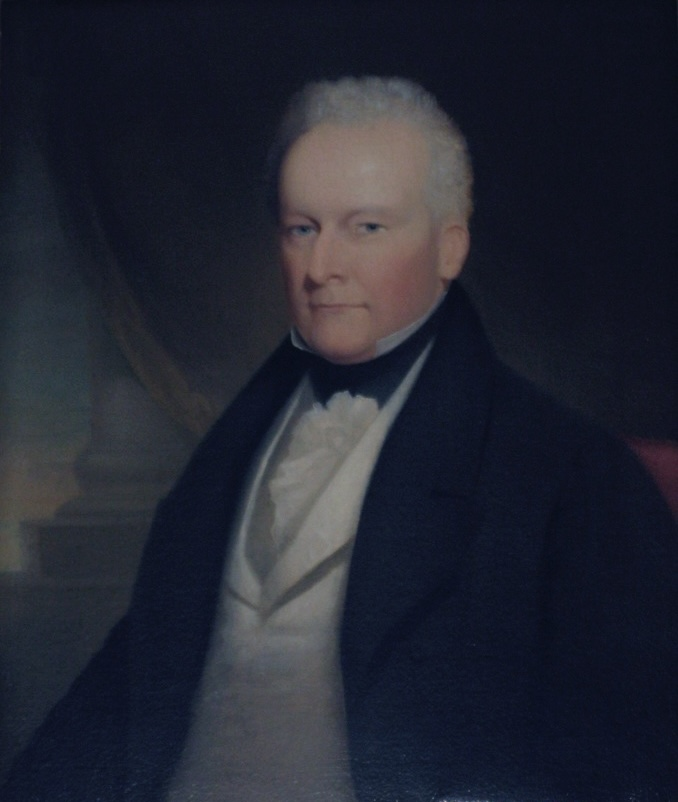
| Nominee | Edward Lloyd |
| Party | Democratic-Republican |
| Popular vote | 80 |
| Percentage | 94.12% |
Governor before election
James Butcher (Acting)
Democratic-Republican
Elected Governor
Edward Lloyd
Democratic-Republican

The June 1809 Maryland gubernatorial election was held on June 5, 1809, in order to elect the governor of Maryland following the resignation of Democratic-Republican governor Robert Wright on May 6, 1809. Democratic-Republican nominee and former member of the U.S. House of Representatives from Maryland's 7th district Edward Lloyd was elected by the Maryland General Assembly against Federalist candidates former United States Senator Charles Carroll and Benjamin Stoddart.

== General election ==
On election day, June 5, 1809, Democratic-Republican nominee Edward Lloyd was elected by the Maryland General Assembly, thereby retaining Democratic-Republican control over the office of governor. Lloyd was sworn in as the 13th governor of Maryland on June 9, 1809.

=== Results ===
Maryland gubernatorial election, June 1809
| Party | Candidate | Votes | % |
|---|---|---|---|
| Democratic-Republican | Edward Lloyd | 80 | 94.12 |
| Federalist | Charles Carroll | 4 | 4.70 |
| Federalist | Benjamin Stoddart | 1 | 1.18 |
| Total votes | | 85 | 100.00 |
| Democratic-Republican hold | | | |
