= November 1809 Maryland gubernatorial election =

- November 13, 1809
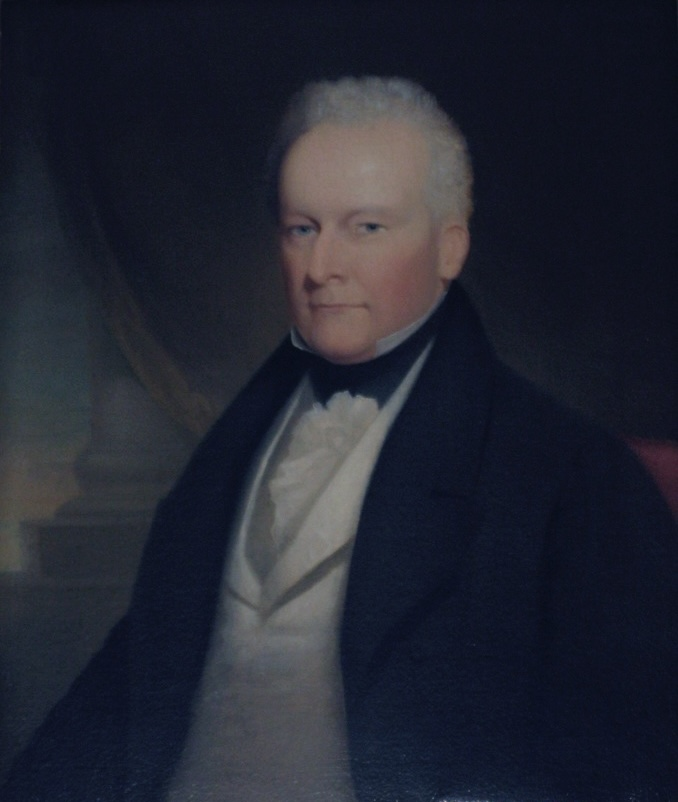

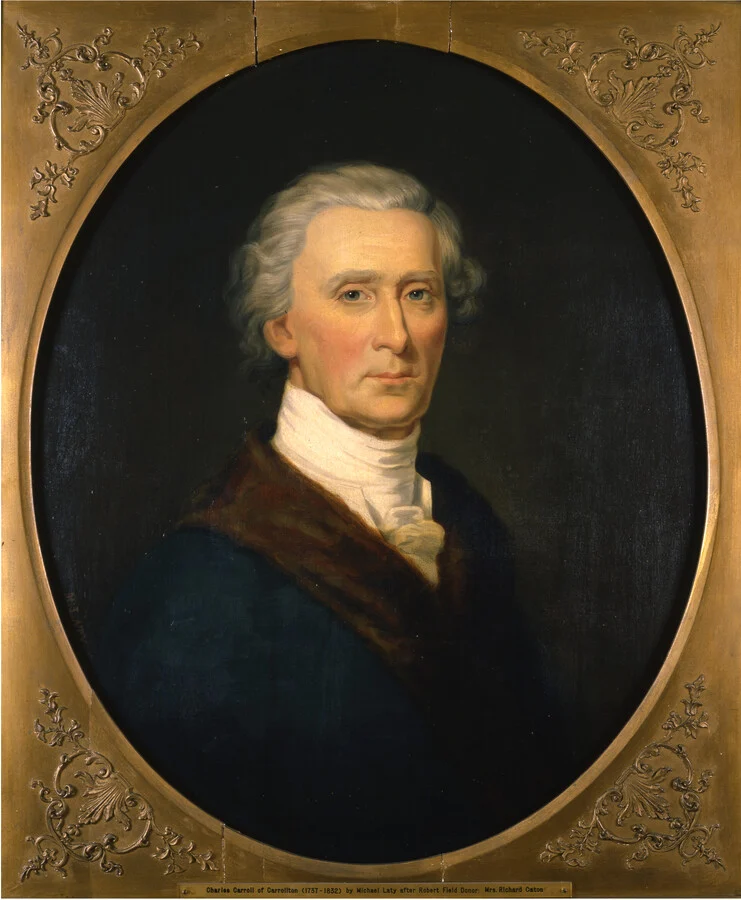

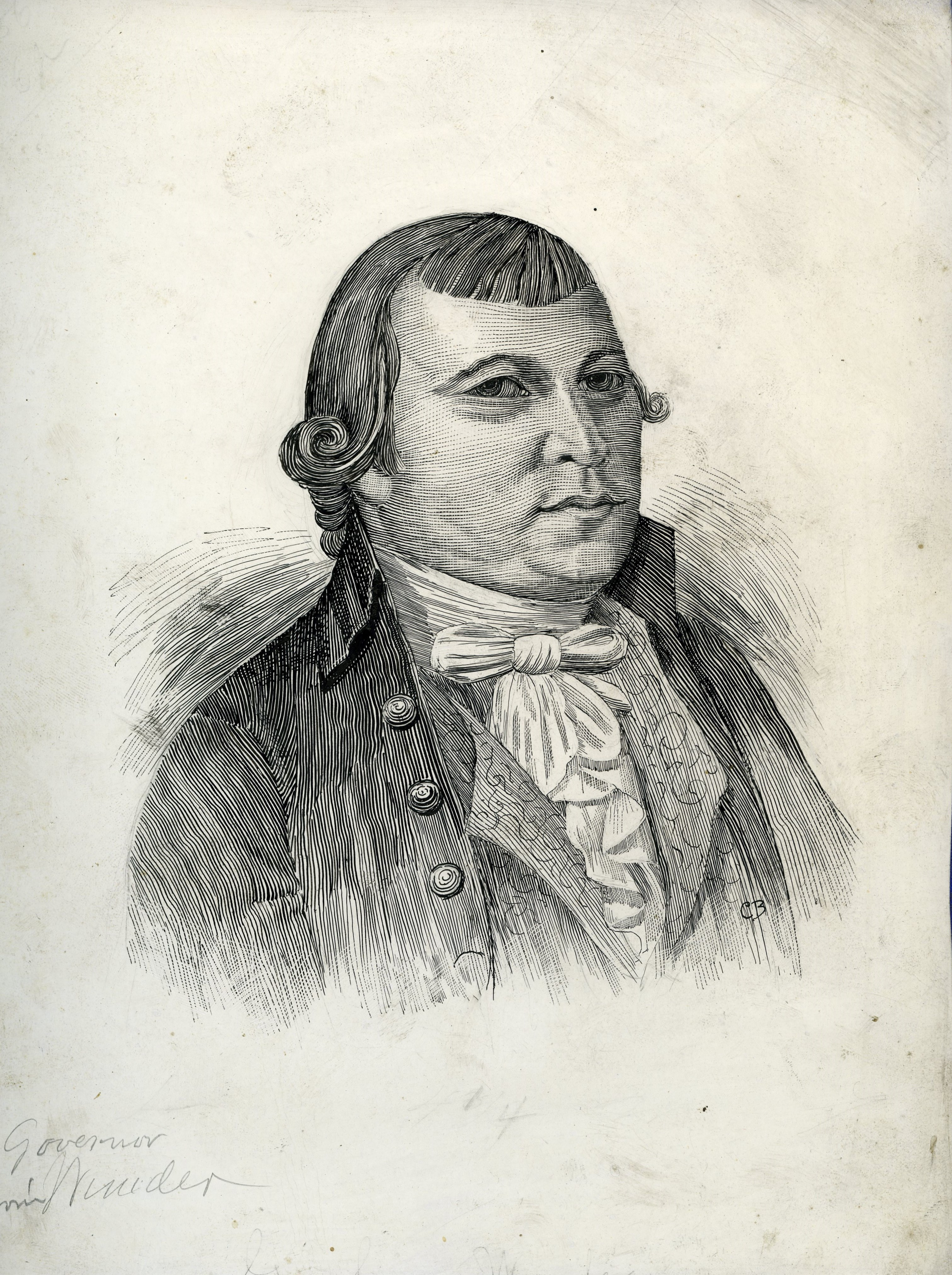
Nominee	Edward Lloyd	Charles Carroll	Levin Winder
Party	Democratic-Republican	Federalist	Federalist
Popular vote	57	16	5
Percentage	70.37%	19.75%	6.17%
Governor before election
Edward Lloyd
Democratic-Republican
Elected Governor
Edward Lloyd
Democratic-Republican

The November 1809 Maryland gubernatorial election was held on November 13, 1809, in order to elect the governor of Maryland. Incumbent Democratic-Republican governor Edward Lloyd was re-elected by the Maryland General Assembly against Federalist candidates former United States senator Charles Carroll, Levin Winder, Benjamin Stoddart and former governor John Eager Howard.

== General election ==
On election day, November 13, 1809, incumbent Democratic-Republican governor Edward Lloyd was re-elected by the Maryland General Assembly, thereby retaining Democratic-Republican control over the office of governor. Lloyd was sworn in for his first full term on November 20, 1809.

=== Results ===
Maryland gubernatorial election, November 1809
Party	Candidate	Votes	%
Democratic-Republican	Edward Lloyd (incumbent)	57	70.37
Federalist	Charles Carroll	16	19.75
Federalist	Levin Winder	5	6.17
Federalist	Benjamin Stoddart	2	2.47
Federalist	John Eager Howard	1	1.24
Total votes		81	100.00
Democratic-Republican hold			
