= Jacob Richards =

American politician (1773–1816)

Member of the U.S. House of Representatives from Pennsylvania's 1st district
- In office March 4, 1803 – March 3, 1809 Serving with Joseph Clay (1803–1808), Michael Leib (1803–1806), John Porter (1806–1809), Benjamin Say (1808–1809)
- Preceded by: William Jones
- Succeeded by: William Anderson; John Porter; Adam Seybert

Personal details
- Born: 1773 near Chester, Province of Pennsylvania, British America
- Died: July 20, 1816 (aged 42–43) near Chester, Pennsylvania, U.S.
- Party: Democratic-Republican
- Education: University of Pennsylvania
- Profession: Politician, lawyer

Jacob Richards (1773 – July 20, 1816) was an American politician and lawyer who served in the United States House of Representatives from 1803 to 1809, representing the 1st congressional district of Pennsylvania as a member of the Democratic-Republican Party.

== Early life and education ==
Richards was born near Chester, Pennsylvania in 1773. He graduated from the University of Pennsylvania in 1791 and studied law.

== Career ==
Richards was admitted to the bar in 1795; he commenced practice in Philadelphia.

Richards served in the United States House of Representatives from 1803 to 1809, representing the 1st congressional district of Pennsylvania as a member of the Democratic-Republican Party.

Richards served in the 8th United States Congress, the 9th United States Congress, and the 10th United States Congress. His time in office began on March 4, 1803 and concluded on March 3, 1809.

Following his tenure in Congress, Richards resumed practicing law until his death in 1816. He was also commissioned as colonel of militia in Delaware County, Pennsylvania.

== Death ==
Richard died near Chester, Pennsylvania on July 20, 1816.

U.S. House of Representatives
Preceded by William Jones	Member of the U.S. House of Representatives from Pennsylvania's 1st congressional district 1803–1809; Served alongside: Joseph Clay (1803–1808), Michael Leib (1803–1806), John Porter (1806–1809), Benjamin Say (1808–1809)	Succeeded by William Anderson; John Porter; Adam Seybert
