= Joseph Clay =

U.S. Representative from Pennsylvania (1769–1811)

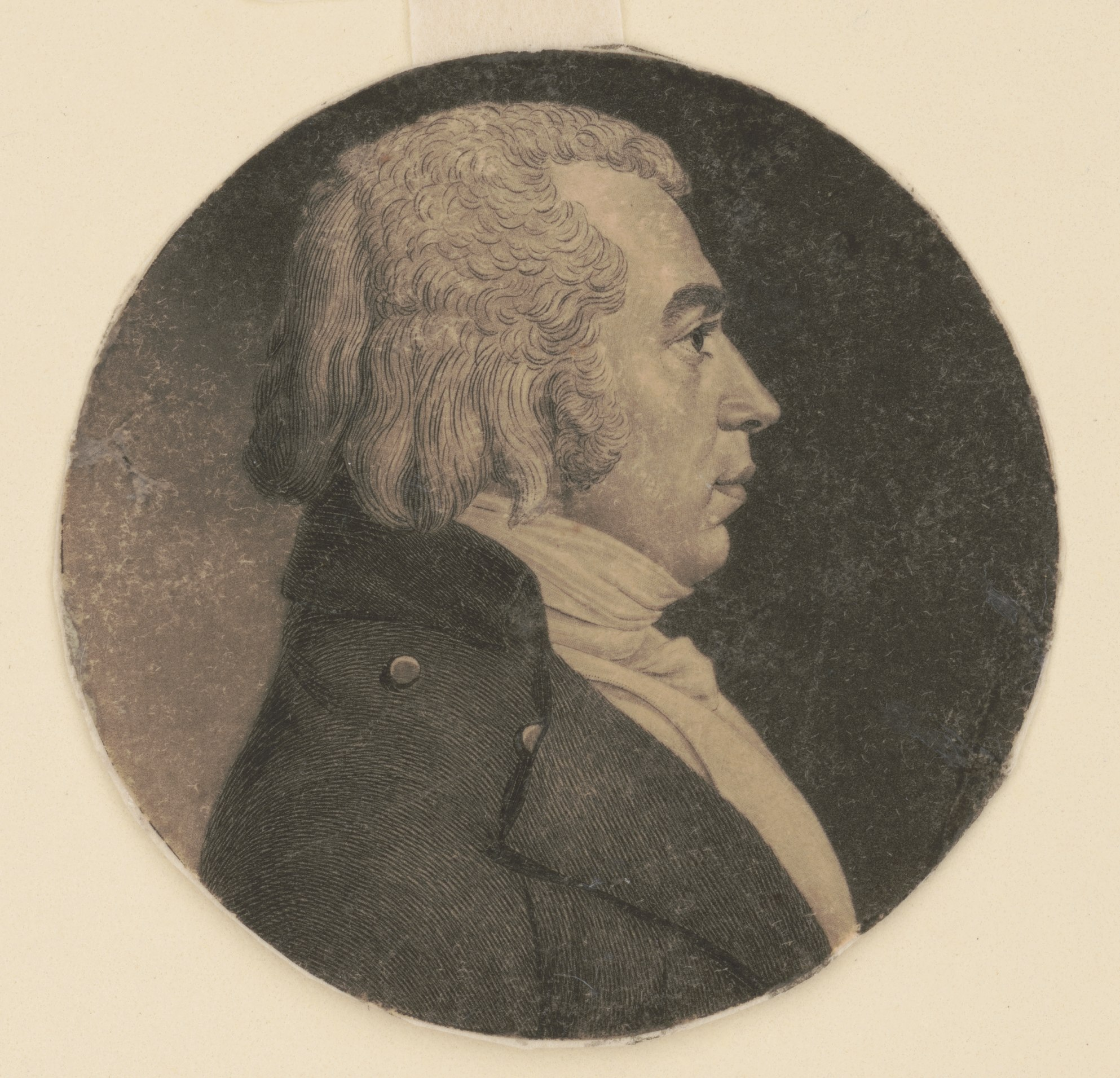

Member of the U.S. House of Representatives from Pennsylvania's 1st district
- In office March 4, 1803 – March 28, 1808
- Preceded by: William Jones
- Succeeded by: Benjamin Say

Personal details
- Born: July 24, 1769 Philadelphia, Province of Pennsylvania, British America
- Died: August 27, 1811 (aged 42) Philadelphia, Pennsylvania, U.S.
- Party: Democratic-Republican

Joseph Clay (July 24, 1769 – August 27, 1811) was a member of the United States House of Representatives from Pennsylvania.

Joseph Clay was born in Philadelphia in the Province of Pennsylvania. He was elected as a Democratic-Republican to the Eighth, Ninth, and Tenth Congresses, and served until his resignation after March 28, 1808. He was also engaged in banking. Clay served as chairman of the United States House Committee on Ways and Means during the Ninth Congress. He was one of the impeachment managers appointed by the House of Representatives in 1804 to conduct the impeachment proceedings against John Pickering, judge of the United States District Court for the District of New Hampshire.

Joseph Clay was elected as a member of the American Philosophical Society held at Philadelphia in 1799.

He became cashier of the Farmers & Mechanics’ Bank of Philadelphia, and died in Philadelphia in 1811. Interment in Christ Church Burying Ground.

He was the father of diplomat John Randolph Clay, and the grandfather of brevet brigadier general Cecil Clay.

== Sources ==
- United States Congress. "Joseph Clay (id: C000486)". Biographical Directory of the United States Congress.
- The Political Graveyard

U.S. House of Representatives
Preceded by William Jones	Member of the U.S. House of Representatives from Pennsylvania's 1st congressional district 1803–1806 alongside: Michael Leib and Jacob Richards 1806–1808 alongside: Jacob Richards and John Porter	Succeeded by Jacob Richards, Benjamin Say, and John Porter
