= Benjamin Say =

American politician (1755–1813)

Benjamin Say (August 28, 1755 – April 23, 1813) was a member of the U.S. House of Representatives from Pennsylvania.

== Biography ==
Benjamin Say was born in Philadelphia, Pennsylvania, to Thomas (1709–1796) and Rebekah Atkinson Budd Say (1716–1795), He married Ann Bartram Bonsall (1759–1793) on Oct. 1, 1776, a granddaughter of naturalist John Bartram. Their son Thomas Say (1787–1835) became a pioneering entomologist.

Say graduated from the medical department of the University of Pennsylvania in Philadelphia in 1780 and practiced in that city. He also worked as an apothecary. He served in the American Revolutionary War, and was a fellow of the College of Physicians of Philadelphia, of which he was one of the founders in 1787, and was treasurer from 1791 to 1809. He was a member of the Pennsylvania Prison Society and president of the Pennsylvania Humane Society. He was a member of the Pennsylvania State Senate.

Say was elected as a Democratic-Republican to the Tenth Congress to fill the vacancy caused by the resignation of Joseph Clay. He was reelected to the Eleventh Congress and served until his resignation in June 1809.

He had a grand house to the southwest of the then-borders of Philadelphia. Dubbed "The Cliffs", it overlooked the Schuylkill River near Gray's Ferry, just upriver from the Bartram estate.

== Death ==
He died in Philadelphia in 1813.

== Sources ==
- United States Congress. "Benjamin Say (id: S000098)". Biographical Directory of the United States Congress.
- The Political Graveyard
- Plan of Say Burial Ground Archived 2016-03-03 at the Wayback Machine, at 3rd and Arch Streets in Philadelphia
- Watercolor of grave marker

U.S. House of Representatives
| Preceded by Joseph Clay; Jacob Richards; John Porter | Member of the U.S. House of Representatives from Pennsylvania's 1st congressional district 1808–1809; 1808–1809 alongside: Jacob Richards; John Porter 1809 alongside: William Anderson | Succeeded by William Anderson; John Porter; Adam Seybert |
