= John Porter (Pennsylvania politician) =

American politician

John Porter was an American politician who served as a U.S. representative from Pennsylvania from December 8, 1806, to March 3, 1811. He was born in Pennsylvania, but his birth date is unknown. He was elected as a Democratic-Republican to the Ninth United States Congress to fill the vacancy caused by the resignation of Michael Leib. He was then re-elected to the Tenth and Eleventh Congresses before losing re-election in 1810.

He was a member of the Pennsylvania State Senate from 1801 to 1805.

U.S. House of Representatives
Preceded by Joseph Clay; Michael Leib and Jacob Richards	Member of the U.S. House of Representatives from Pennsylvania's 1st congressional district 1806–1811 1806–1808 alongside: Joseph Clay and Jacob Richards; 1808–1809 alongside: Jacob Richards and Benjamin Say; 1809–1811 alongside: William Anderson and Adam Seybert	Succeeded by William Anderson; Adam Seybert and James Milnor
