= 1809 United States Senate election in New York =

The 1809 United States Senate election in New York was held on February 7, 1809, by the New York State Legislature to elect a U.S. senator (Class 1) to represent the State of New York in the United States Senate.

== Background ==
Samuel L. Mitchill had been elected in November 1804, after the seat had been occupied by Theodorus Bailey (1803–1804) and John Armstrong (1804). He took his seat on November 23, 1804, and his term would expire on March 3, 1809.

At the State election in April 1808, a Democratic-Republican majority was elected to the assembly, and 8 of the 9 state senators up for renewal were Democratic-Republicans. Due to the split of the public opinion over the embargo against the United Kingdom, which eventually led to the War of 1812, the Federalists managed to elect a much larger number of assemblymen than during the previous years. The party strength in the Assembly was estimated at 60 to 45, this being the vote for Speaker: 60 for James W. Wilkin and 45 for Stephen Van Rensselaer. The 32nd New York State Legislature met from November 1 to 8, 1808; and from January 17 to March 30, 1809, at Albany, New York.

== Candidates ==
Assemblyman Obadiah German was the candidate of the Democratic-Republican Party.

The incumbent U.S. Senator Dr. Samuel L. Mitchill ran for re-election.

Ex-Clerk of Dutchess County David Brooks, a former Congressman (1797–1799), was the candidate of the Federalist Party.

== Result ==
Obadiah German was elected.

1809 United States Senator election result
| Office | House | Democratic-Republican | | Federalist | | Democratic-Republican | |
|---|---|---|---|---|---|---|---|
| U.S. Senator | State Senate (32 members) | | 16 | | 1 | | 9 |
| | State Assembly (111 members) | | 49 | | 42 | | 7 |
| | | Obadiah German | 65 | David Brooks | 43 | Samuel L. Mitchill | 16 |

== Sources ==
- The New York Civil List compiled in 1858 (see: pg. 63 for U.S. Senators; pg. 120 for state senators 1808–09; pg. 182f for Members of Assembly 1808–09)
- Members of the 11th United States Congress
- History of Political Parties in the State of New-York by Jabez Delano Hammond (page 276)
- Election result at Tufts University Library project "A New Nation Votes"
