= Benjamin Ruggles =

American senator for Ohio (1783–1857)

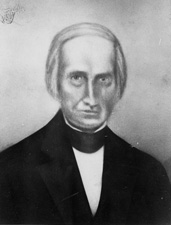

United States Senator from Ohio
- In office March 4, 1815 – March 3, 1833
- Preceded by: Joseph Kerr
- Succeeded by: Thomas Morris

Personal details
- Born: February 21, 1783 Abington, Connecticut
- Died: September 2, 1857 (aged 74) St. Clairsville, Ohio
- Party: Democratic-Republican

Benjamin Ruggles (February 21, 1783 – September 2, 1857) was a National Republican and Whig politician from Ohio. He served in the U.S. Senate.

== Biography ==
Born in Abington, Connecticut, Ruggles studied law and was admitted to the bar. Ruggles moved to Marietta, Ohio, to practice law in 1807, then moved to St. Clairsville, Ohio, in 1810.

== Career ==
After serving as a judge in the Ohio state courts from 1810 to 1815, Ruggles was elected to the Senate, serving three terms from 1815-1833. He did not run for re-election in 1832. He was the Ohio Presidential elector in 1836 for Whig William Henry Harrison.

== Family life ==
Ruggles married in Connecticut in 1812. His first wife died in St. Clairsville in 1817, and he remarried in 1825.

== Death ==
Ruggles died on September 2, 1857, and was buried in Saint Clairsville Union Cemetery in St. Clairsville, Ohio.

== Notes ==
U.S. Senate
| Preceded by Joseph Kerr | U.S. senator (Class 1) from Ohio; 1815–1833; Served alongside: Jeremiah Morrow, William A. Trimble, Ethan A. Brown, William H. Harrison, Jacob Burnet, Thomas Ewing | Succeeded by Thomas Morris |
Legal offices
| Preceded by Calvin Pease | President Judge of the Ohio Court of Common Pleas; 3rd Judicial Circuit; 1810–1815 | Succeeded by George Tod |
