= Jonathan Roberts (politician) =

American politician (1771–1854)

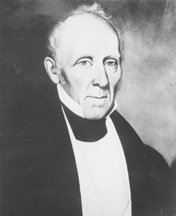

United States Senator from Pennsylvania
- In office February 24, 1814 – March 4, 1821
- Preceded by: Michael Leib
- Succeeded by: William Findlay

Member of the U.S. House of Representatives from Pennsylvania's 2nd district
- In office March 4, 1811 – February 24, 1814
- Preceded by: Robert Brown, John Ross and William Milnor
- Succeeded by: Roger Davis and Samuel Henderson

Member of the Pennsylvania Senate
- In office 1807-1811

Member of the Pennsylvania House of Representatives
- In office 1799-1800

Personal details
- Born: August 16, 1771 near Norristown, Province of Pennsylvania, British America
- Died: July 24, 1854 (aged 82) King of Prussia, Pennsylvania, U.S.
- Resting place: Near Norristown
- Party: Democratic-Republican
- Occupation: Farmer
- Committees: Committee on Claims; Committee to Audit and Control the Contingent Expenses; Committee on Public Buildings

Jonathan Roberts (August 16, 1771 – July 24, 1854) was an American politician who served as a United States representative and Senator from Pennsylvania from 1811 to 1814 and 1814 to 1821 respectively. He was a member of the Democratic-Republican Party.

== Life and career ==
Roberts was born near Norristown in the Province of Pennsylvania and was educated by a private tutor. He later worked as a wheelwright apprentice. From 1799 to 1800 Roberts served as a member of the Pennsylvania House of Representatives, and the Pennsylvania State Senate from 1807 to 1811.

On March 4, 1811, he began his tenure as a United States representative from Pennsylvania's 2nd congressional district, having been elected as a Democratic-Republican. Working through the 12th and 13th United States Congresses he resigned on February 24, 1814, having been elected to the United States Senate to replace Michael Leib, who himself had resigned. He started his service in the Senate on the same day.

Re-elected to a full term later in 1814, Roberts was the chairman of the Committee on Claims from the 14th through to the 16th Congress inclusive. During the 16th he was also on the Committee to Audit and Control the Contingent Expenses and the Committee on Public Buildings. He left the Senate on March 4, 1821.

From 1823 to 1826 he was again a member of the Pennsylvania House of Representatives, and later became the collector of customs at the port of Philadelphia from 1841 to 1842. In 1848, Roberts built a school in Upper Merion for poor children who had to walk some distance from mill workers' houses to their previous school.

He died at the age of 82 on his farm, Robertsville, in King of Prussia, and was interred in the Roberts family cemetery In Upper Merion township, near Norristown, Montgomery County, Pennsylvania.

== Sources ==
- Morrison, J. "Roberts School". Upper Merion Park and Historic Foundation. Archived from the original on March 17, 2010.
- "Roberts, Jonathan, (1771 - 1854)". Biographical Directory of the United States Congress. United States Congress.
- "Index to Politicians: Roberts, J". The Political Graveyard.

U.S. House of Representatives
Preceded by Robert Brown; John Ross; William Milnor	Member of the U.S. House of Representatives from Pennsylvania's 2nd congressional district March 4, 1811 – February 24, 1814 alongside (1811 – 1813): Robert Brown and William Rodman (in a 3-seat district) alongside (1813–1814): Roger Davis (in a 2-seat district)	Succeeded by Roger Davis; Samuel Henderson
U.S. Senate
Preceded by Michael Leib	U.S. senator (Class 1) from Pennsylvania; February 24, 1814 – March 3, 1821; Served alongside: Abner Lacock, Walter Lowrie	Succeeded by William Findlay
Preceded by Samuel C. Crafts	Oldest living U.S. senator November 19, 1853 – July 24, 1854	Succeeded by Benjamin Tappan
