= Michael Leib =

American politician (1760–1822)

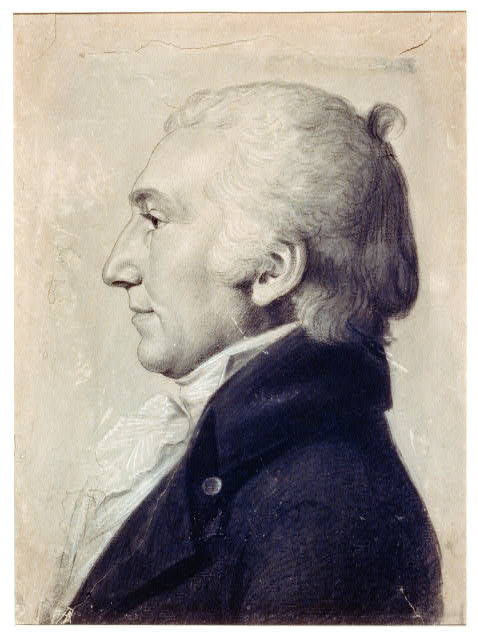

Member of the Pennsylvania Senate from the 1st district
- In office 1818–1821
- Preceded by: John Read
- Succeeded by: Condy Raguet

Member of the Pennsylvania House of Representatives
- In office 1817–1818

United States Senator from Pennsylvania
- In office January 9, 1809 – February 14, 1814
- Preceded by: Samuel Maclay
- Succeeded by: Jonathan Roberts

Member of the Pennsylvania House of Representatives
- In office 1806–1808

Member of the U.S. House of Representatives from Pennsylvania
- In office March 4, 1799 – February 14, 1806
- Preceded by: Blair McClenachan
- Succeeded by: John Porter
- Constituency: 2nd district (1799–1803); 1st district (1803–1806)

Member of the Pennsylvania House of Representatives
- In office 1795–1798

Personal details
- Born: January 8, 1760 Philadelphia, Province of Pennsylvania
- Died: December 22, 1822 (aged 62) Philadelphia, Pennsylvania, U.S.
- Resting place: Laurel Hill Cemetery, Philadelphia, Pennsylvania, U.S.
- Party: Democratic-Republican

Michael Leib (January 8, 1760 – December 22, 1822) was an American physician and politician from Philadelphia. He served as a surgeon in the Philadelphia Militia during the American Revolutionary War. He served as a Democratic-Republican member of the Pennsylvania House of Representatives three times; from 1795 to 1798, 1806 to 1808 and 1817 to 1818. He served as a member of the United States House of Representatives for Pennsylvania's 2nd congressional district from 1799 to 1803 and for Pennsylvania's 1st congressional district from 1803 to 1806. He served as a member of the United States Senate for Pennsylvania from 1809 to 1814. He also served as a member of the Pennsylvania State Senate for the 1st district from 1818 to 1821.

== Biography ==
Leib was born in Philadelphia, Pennsylvania to George and Dorothea Leib. He studied and practiced medicine in Philadelphia, received a commission as a surgeon in the Philadelphia Militia in 1780 and served during the American Revolutionary War. Following the war, Leib returned to Philadelphia and continued the practice of medicine. He served on the staff of several Philadelphia hospitals and was a member of the committee of correspondence in 1793.

He was one of the organizers of the German Republican Society in Philadelphia. He represented the large German immigrant population in Philadelphia. He and Benjamin Bache became a part of a radical faction of the Society which led to a schism in the Society over the Whiskey Rebellion. Leib and his brother volunteered to join the military force sent to control the insurrection.

He was elected as a member of the Pennsylvania House of Representatives and served from 1795 to 1798. He was elected to the United States House of Representatives from Pennsylvania's 2nd congressional district and served from 1799 to 1803. He continued in the United States House of Representatives from Pennsylvania's 1st congressional district from 1803 to 1806. He resigned to return to the Pennsylvania House and served from 1806 to 1808. He served on the committee of correspondence for the Chesapeake–Leopard affair in June 1807.

From 1805 to 1809, a power struggle ensued in the Pennsylvania Republican Party with Leib and William J. Duane on one side and Simon Snyder on the other. Duane and Leib represented the interests of Philadelphia, such as banking, trade and shipping, whereas Snyder represented the interests of rural Pennsylvania such as land ownership.

In 1807, he was elected Brigadier-General of the Second Brigade of the Philadelphia Militia.

Leib was elected as a Democratic-Republican to the United States Senate by the state legislature in December 1808. Leib was elected to the term beginning on March 4, 1809, but assumed office on January 9, 1809, following the resignation of Samuel Maclay.

In 1809, he was a member of the committee that formed the "Whig Society of Pennsylvania".

He served as a U.S. senator until February 14, 1814, and resigned to serve as postmaster of Philadelphia from 1814 to 1815. He returned to the Pennsylvania House for a third time, from 1817 until 1818 and served as a Pennsylvania State Senator for the 1st district from 1818 until 1821. He became prothonotary of the United States district court in Philadelphia in November 1822 and served in that role until his death in December 1822.

He was interred at St. John's Lutheran Churchyard in the Northern Liberties neighborhood of Philadelphia. In 1924, he was reinterred to the Laurel Hill Cemetery in Philadelphia when the church and burial ground were demolished during the construction of the Benjamin Franklin Bridge.

== Bibliography ==
- A Portrait of the evils of democracy, submitted to the consideration of the people of Maryland, Baltimore Printed, 1816

Pennsylvania House of Representatives
Preceded by	Member of the Pennsylvania House of Representatives; 1795–1798; 1806–1808; 1817–1818	Succeeded by
U.S. House of Representatives
Preceded by Blair McClenachan	Member of the U.S. House of Representatives from Pennsylvania's 2nd congressional district March 4, 1799 – March 3, 1803	Succeeded by Robert Brown, Frederick Conrad, Isaac Van Horne
Preceded by William Jones	Member of the U.S. House of Representatives from Pennsylvania's 1st congressional district March 4, 1803 – February 14, 1806; Served alongside: Joseph Clay, Jacob Richards	Succeeded by Jacob Richards, Benjamin Say, John Porter
U.S. Senate
Preceded by Samuel Maclay	U.S. senator (Class 1) from Pennsylvania; January 9, 1809 – February 14, 1814; Served alongside: Andrew Gregg, Abner Lacock	Succeeded by Jonathan Roberts
Pennsylvania State Senate
Preceded by John Read	Member of the Pennsylvania Senate, 1st district 1818–1821	Succeeded by Condy Raguet
