= 1810 United States House of Representatives elections in Pennsylvania =

United States House of Representatives elections in Pennsylvania, 1810
- October 9, 1810

All 18 Pennsylvania seats to the United States House of Representatives
	Majority party	Minority party
Party	Democratic-Republican	Federalist
Last election	16	2
Seats won	17	1
Seat change	▲1	▼1

Elections to the United States House of Representatives were held in Pennsylvania on October 9, 1810, for the 12th Congress. The Federalists were in decline in Pennsylvania at this time. In six of the eleven districts there were no Federalist candidates.

== Background ==
Eighteen Representatives had been elected in 1808, 16 Democratic-Republicans and 2 Federalists. One Democratic-Republican resigned and was replaced by another Representative from the same party, so that there was still a 16-2 division. Four of the Democratic-Republicans and two of the Federalists were "quids", a short-lived alliance of moderate Democratic-Republicans and Federalists. That was the last year in which the quids as a movement existed.

== Congressional districts ==
Pennsylvania was divided into 11 districts, of which four were plural districts with 11 Representatives between them, with the remaining 7 Representatives elected from single-member districts. The districts were:

- The 1st district (3 seats) consisted of Delaware and Philadelphia counties (including the City of Philadelphia)
- The 2nd district (3 seats) consisted of Bucks, Luzerne, Montgomery, Northampton, Susquehanna, and Wayne Counties
- The 3rd district (3 seats) consisted of Berks, Chester, and Lancaster Counties
- The 4th district (2 seats) consisted of Cumberland, Dauphin, Huntingdon, and Mifflin Counties
- The 5th district consisted of Bradford, Centre, Clearfield, Lycoming, McKean, Northumberland, Potter, and Tioga Counties
- The 6th district consisted of Adams and York Counties
- The 7th district consisted of Bedford and Franklin Counties
- The 8th district consisted of Armstrong, Cambria, Indiana, Jefferson, Somerset, and Westmoreland Counties
- The 9th district consisted of Fayette and Greene Counties
- The 10th district consisted of Washington County
- The 11th district consisted of Allegheny, Beaver, Butler, Crawford, Erie, Mercer, Venango, and Warren Counties

Note: Many of these counties covered much larger areas than they do today, having since been divided into smaller counties

== Election results ==
Fifteen incumbents (14 Democratic-Republicans and 1 Federalist) ran for re-election, of whom ten were re-elected. The incumbents John Ross (DR) of the 2nd district, Robert Jenkins (F) of the 3rd district and Matthias Richards (DR) also of the 3rd district did not run for re-election. Two seats changed from Federalist to Democratic-Republican control and one seat changed from Democratic-Republican to Federalist control, for a net loss of 1 seat by the Federalists. In the 1st district, there was a split between three "New School" and one "Old School" Democratic-Republicans, which split the Democratic-Republican vote enough to allow one of the three seats in that district to be won by a Federalist.

1810 United States House election results
District	Democratic-Republican			Federalist		
1st 3 seats	Adam Seybert (I)	6,276	19.8%	James Milnor	4,359	13.7%
1st 3 seats	William Anderson (I)	6,218	19.6%	Thomas Truxton	4,343	13.7%
1st 3 seats	John Porter (I)	3,143	9.9%	Thomas Dick	4,269	13.4%
1st 3 seats	Robert McMullin	3,127	9.9%			
2nd 3 seats	Robert Brown (I)	5,444	19.1%	William Milnor (I)	4,132	14.5%
2nd 3 seats	Jonathan Roberts	5,409	19.0%	Levi Paulding	4,033	14.2%
2nd 3 seats	William Rodman	5,377	18.9%	William Latimere	3,955	13.9%
2nd 3 seats				Charles Miner	102	0.4%
3rd 3 seats	Joseph Lefever	6,616	18.4%	Daniel Hiester (I)	5,770	16.0%
3rd 3 seats	Roger Davis	6,612	18.3%	Samuel Bethel	5,437	15.1%
3rd 3 seats	John M. Hyneman	6,201	17.2%	Mark J. Biddle	5,410	15.0%
4th 2 seats	David Bard (I)	5,436	50.0%			
4th 2 seats	Robert Whitehill (I)	5,429	50.0%			
5th	George Smith (I)	3,576	100%			
6th	William Crawford (I)	2,332	56.6%	David Cassat	1,790	43.4%
7th	William Piper	1,428	58.5%			
7th	John Rea (I)	1,015	41.5%			
8th	William Findley (I)	2,735	60.9%			
8th	John Kirkpatrick	1,757	39.1%			
9th	John Smilie	1,401	100%			
10th	Aaron Lyle (I)	1,344	70.4%	Thomas L. Birch	564	29.6%
11th	Abner Lacock	2,897	51.0%			
11th	Adamson Tannehill	2,455	43.2%			
11th	Samuel Smith (I)	326	5.7%			

== Post-Election ==
All 18 Representatives elected in October appeared in Washington at the start of the 12th Congress. John Smilie (DR) of the 9th district died December 30, 1812. Abner Lacock (DR) of the 11th district resigned February 24, 1813, after being elected to the Senate. Both had been re-elected to the 13th Congress, and both districts were left vacant for the remainder of the 12th Congress.
