= 1806 United States House of Representatives elections in Pennsylvania =

United States House of Representatives elections in Pennsylvania,
- October 14, 1806

All Pennsylvania seats to the United States House of Representatives
	Majority party	Minority party
Party	Democratic-Republican	Federalist
Last election	17	1
Seats won	15	3
Seat change	▼2	▲2

Elections to the United States House of Representatives were held in Pennsylvania on October 14, 1806, for the 10th Congress.

== Background ==
In the previous elections, 17 Democratic-Republicans and 1 Federalist had been elected to represent Pennsylvania. There were two subsequent special elections which did not result in any seats changing parties. One seat held by a Democratic-Republican had become vacant and was not yet filled at the time of the election.

As in the previous election, there was a breakaway faction of the Democratic-Republican Party allied with the Federalists known as the tertium quids or Constitutional Republicans, which ran candidates in several districts. Several of the elected quids aligned with the Federalists on the federal level.

== Congressional districts ==
Pennsylvania was divided into 11 districts, of which four were plural districts with 11 Representatives between them, with the remaining 7 Representatives elected from single-member districts. The districts were:

- The 1st district (3 seats) consisted of Delaware and Philadelphia counties (including the City of Philadelphia)
- The 2nd district (3 seats) consisted of Bucks, Luzerne, Montgomery, Northampton, and Wayne Counties
- The 3rd district (3 seats) consisted of Berks, Chester, and Lancaster Counties
- The 4th district (2 seats) consisted of Cumberland, Dauphin, Huntingdon, and Mifflin Counties
- The 5th district consisted of Centre, Clearfield, Lycoming, McKean, Northumberland, Potter, and Tioga Counties
- The 6th district consisted of Adams and York Counties
- The 7th district consisted of Bedford and Franklin Counties
- The 8th district consisted of Armstrong, Cambria, Indiana, Jefferson, Somerset, and Westmoreland Counties
- The 9th district consisted of Fayette and Greene Counties
- The 10th district consisted of Washington County
- The 11th district consisted of Allegheny, Beaver, Butler, Crawford, Erie, Mercer, Venango, and Warren Counties

Note: Many of these counties covered much larger areas than they do today, having since been divided into smaller counties

== Election results ==
Fifteen incumbents (14 Democratic-Republicans and the sole Federalist) ran for re-election, of whom eleven won re-election. The incumbents Isaac Anderson (DR) and Christian Lower (DR), both of the 2nd district did not run for re-election and one seat in the 1st district was vacant, the previous incumbent Michael Leib (DR) having resigned February 14, 1806. Two seats changed from Democratic-Republican to Federalist control.

Election results are unavailable for the 8th district.

1806 United States House election results
District	Democratic-Republican			Quid			Federalist			Unknown		
1st 3 seats	John Porter	4,857	21.1%	John Sergeant	1,578	6.8%	William Graham	4,223	18.3%			
1st 3 seats	Jacob Richards (I)	4,770	20.7%				Joseph Hemphill	2,922	12.7%			
1st 3 seats	Joseph Clay (I)	4,700	20.4%									
2nd 3 seats	Robert Brown	5,180	18.0%	William Milnor	4,824	16.8%						
2nd 3 seats	John Pugh	4,761	16.6%	Frederick Conrad (I)	4,659	16.2%						
2nd 3 seats	John Hahn	4,750	16.5%	William Latimore	4,589	16.0%						
3rd 3 seats	John Whitehill (I)	5,666	15.5%	John Hiester	6,709	18.3%						
3rd 3 seats	Roger Davis	5,545	15.2%	Matthias Richards	6,625	18.1%						
3rd 3 seats	William Witman	5,539	15.1%	Robert Jenkins	6,487	17.7%						
4th 2 seats	Robert Whitehill (I)	6,024	47.7%							Oliver Pollock	225	1.8%
4th 2 seats	David Bard (I)	5,388	42.7%									
4th 2 seats	Evers Doty	983	7.8%									
5th	Daniel Montgomery, Jr.	3,161	57.7%	Andrew Gregg (I)	2,321	42.3%						
6th				James Kelly (I)	2,979	100%						
7th	John Rea (I)	1,511	52.7%	Henry Woods	503	17.6%	Andrew Dunlap	852	29.7%			
8th	William Findley (I)		100%									
9th	John Smilie (I)	1,987	100%									
10th	William Hoge	1,203	62.0%	John Hamilton (I)	737	38.0%						
11th	Samuel Smith	3,339	55.9%	John Wilkins	2,621	44.1%						

== Special election ==
Joseph Clay (DR) of the 1st district resigned March 18, 1808. A special election was held October 11, 1808, the same day as the 1808 general elections.

1808 Special election results
District	Democratic-Republican			Federalist		
1st	Benjamin Say	7,598	55.7%	Charles W. Hare	6,046	44.3%
