= 1808 United States House of Representatives elections in Pennsylvania =

United States House of Representatives elections in Pennsylvania, 1808
- October 11, 1808

All 18 Pennsylvania seats to the United States House of Representatives
	Majority party	Minority party
Party	Democratic-Republican	Federalist
Last election	15	3
Seats won	16	2
Seat change	▲1	▼1

Elections to the United States House of Representatives were held in Pennsylvania on October 11, 1808, for the 11th Congress.

== Background ==
Eighteen Representatives had been elected in the previous election, 15 Democratic-Republicans and 3 Federalists. All three Federalists and two of the Democratic-Republicans were quids, an alliance of moderate Democratic-Republicans and Federalists. One seat held by a Democratic-Republican had become vacant prior to this election and was filled in a special election held at the same time as this election.

== Congressional districts ==
Pennsylvania was divided into 11 districts, of which four were plural districts with 11 Representatives between them, with the remaining 7 Representatives elected from single-member districts. The districts were:

- The 1st district (3 seats) consisted of Delaware and Philadelphia counties (including the City of Philadelphia)
- The 2nd district (3 seats) consisted of Bucks, Luzerne, Montgomery, Northampton, and Wayne Counties
- The 3rd district (3 seats) consisted of Berks, Chester, and Lancaster Counties
- The 4th district (2 seats) consisted of Cumberland, Dauphin, Huntingdon, and Mifflin Counties
- The 5th district consisted of Centre, Clearfield, Lycoming, McKean, Northumberland, Potter, and Tioga Counties
- The 6th district consisted of Adams and York Counties
- The 7th district consisted of Bedford and Franklin Counties
- The 8th district consisted of Armstrong, Cambria, Indiana, Jefferson, Somerset, and Westmoreland Counties
- The 9th district consisted of Fayette and Greene Counties
- The 10th district consisted of Washington County
- The 11th district consisted of Allegheny, Beaver, Butler, Crawford, Erie, Mercer, Venango, and Warren Counties

Luzerne County's western border was altered between the 1806 and 1808 elections, altering the boundary between the 2nd and 5th districts

Note: Many of these counties covered much larger areas than they do today, having since been divided into smaller counties

== Election results ==
Thirteen incumbents (10 Democratic-Republicans and 3 Federalists) ran for re-election, of whom 11 won re-election. The incumbents Jacob Richards (DR) of the 1st district, John Hiester (DR) of the 3rd district, Daniel Montgomery (DR) of the 5th district and William Hoge (DR) of the 10th district did not run for re-election. There was also a vacancy in the 1st district. One seat changed from Federalist to Democratic-Republican control.

1808 United States House election results
District	Democratic-Republican			Quid			Federalist		
1st 3 seats	Benjamin Say	7,598	18.5%				Joseph Hemphill	6,123	14.9%
1st 3 seats	John Porter (I)	7,589	18.5%				Derick Peterson	6,098	14.9%
1st 3 seats	William Anderson	7,559	18.4%				Charles W. Hare	6,052	14.8%
2nd 3 seats	Robert Brown (I)	9,218	16.9%	John Ross	9,167	16.8%			
2nd 3 seats	John Pugh (I)	9,090	16.7%	William Milnor (I)	9,095	16.7%			
2nd 3 seats	John Hahn	9,026	16.6%	Roswell Wells	8,941	16.4%			
3rd 3 seats	John Whitehill	10,216	16.4%	Matthias Richards (I)	10,652	17.1%			
3rd 3 seats	Roger Davis	10,161	16.3%	Daniel Hiester	10,652	17.1%			
3rd 3 seats	William Witman	10,121	16.2%	Robert Jenkins (I)	10,542	16.9%			
4th 2 seats	Robert Whitehill (I)	8,807	36.7%				John Gloninger	3,228	13.5%
4th 2 seats	David Bard (I)	8,774	36.6%				William Alexander	3,165	13.2%
5th	George Smith	7,191	82.3%				John Bull	1,549	17.7%
6th	William Crawford	3,506	52.4%				James Kelly (I)	3,188	47.6%
7th	John Rea (I)	3,496	61.5%				Andrew Dunlap	2,191	38.5%
8th	John Kirkpatrick	1,732	29.1%	William Findley (I)	2,718	45.7%			
8th	Robert Philson	1,502	25.2%						
9th	John Smilie (I)	3,183	67.3%				Thomas Meason	1,550	32.7%
10th	Aaron Lyle (I)	3,425	76.5%	John Hamilton	1,053	23.5%			
11th	Samuel Smith (I)	6,206	68.3%				Alexander Foster	2,885	31.7%
1st (special)	Benjamin Say	7,598	55.7%				Charles W. Hare	6,046	44.3%

== Special election ==
Benjamin Say (DR) of the 1st district resigned in June, 1809, and a special election was held to fill the resulting vacancy

1809 Special election results
District	Democratic-Republican		
1st	Adam Seybert	5,936	59.5%
1st	Richard R. Smith	4,043	40.5%
