= An Act for the Gradual Abolition of Slavery =

1780 Pennsylvania General Assembly act

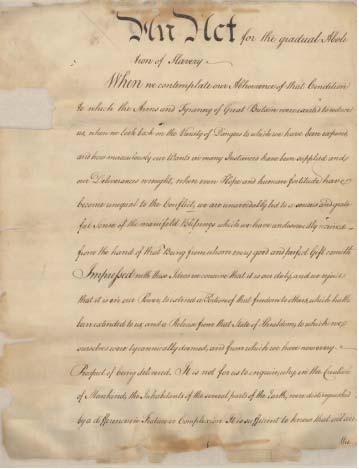
An Act for the Gradual Abolition of Slavery, Supreme Executive Council of Pennsylvania, March 1, 1780, Pennsylvania State Archives

An Act for the Gradual Abolition of Slavery, passed by the Fifth Pennsylvania General Assembly on 1 March 1780, prescribed an end for slavery in the Commonwealth of Pennsylvania in the United States. It was the first slavery abolition act in the course of human history to be adopted by an elected body.

This state legislative action prohibited the further importation of slaves into the state, required Pennsylvania slaveholders to annually register their slaves (with forfeiture for noncompliance, and manumission for the enslaved), and established that all children born in Pennsylvania were free persons regardless of the condition or race of their parents.

Those enslaved in Pennsylvania before the 1780 law came into effect remained enslaved. Pennsylvania's legislative "gradual abolition"—rather than Massachusetts's 1783 judicial ruling ordering immediate abolition— became a model for abolition in other northern states.

== 1780 Act ==
A draft bill for the Gradual Abolition of Slavery was initially presented on August 21, 1778. It eventually passed on March 1, 1780. Matthew Hughes (1733-1810) of Buckingham Township, Bucks County, is credited as the author and chief advocate of the legislation. He was the great-grandson of Judge William Biles, an early Pennsylvania legislator and justice of the first Supreme Court for Pennsylvania. He was also a great-grandson of Governor Samuel Jenings, the first elected governor of West New Jersey.

The 1780 Act prohibited the further importation of slaves into the state, but also preserved the "property rights" of slaveholders by not freeing current slaves. It changed the legal status of future children born to enslaved Pennsylvania mothers from "slave" to "indentured servant," but required those children to continue working for their mothers' slaveholders until the age of 28. To verify that no additional slaves were imported, the Act created a registry of all slaves in the commonwealth. Pennsylvanians who failed to annually register their slaves, or who handled those registrations improperly, were required by law to set the individuals they were enslaving free by manumission.

The 1780 Act specifically exempted members of the U.S. Congress and their slaves. At that time, the U.S. Congress was the only branch of the federal government operating under the Articles of Confederation; it met in Philadelphia.

=== Members of the Fifth Pennsylvania General Assembly ===
*member list incomplete / vote incomplete

==== Northumberland County ====
- William Montgomery — "yes"

==== City of Philadelphia ====
- George Bryan — "yes"
- William Hollingshead
- Jacob Schriener
- Michael Shubart
- Charles Willson Peale

==== Philadelphia County ====
- John Bayard
- Robert Knox
- Robert Lollar
- Joseph M'Clean
- Edward Heston — "yes"
- William Coats
- Daniel Hiester
- Samuel Mechlin
- Joseph Blewer

==== Bucks County ====
- Gerardus Wynkoop II
- Matthew Hughes [III]
- Benjamin Fell
- William Scott
- Arthur Watts
- Joseph Savage

==== Chester County ====
- David Thomas
- Henry Hayes
- John Fulton
- James Boyd
- Patrick Anderson
- Joseph Park
- William Harris
- Sketchly Morton

==== Lancaster County ====
- James Anderson
- John Smiley
- John Gilchreest
- Christopher Kucher
- James Cunningham
- William Brown Sr.
- Emanuel Carpenter, Jr.
- William Porter

== 1788 Amendment ==
An Amendment, created to explain and to close loopholes in the 1780 Act, was passed in the Pennsylvania legislature on March 29, 1788. The Amendment prohibited Pennsylvanians from transporting pregnant enslaved women out-of-state so that their children would be born enslaved, and also prohibited Pennsylvanians from separating enslaved husbands from wives and enslaved children from parents. It required Pennsylvanians to register, within six months, the births of children to enslaved mothers. It prohibited all Pennsylvanians from participating in, building or equipping ships for, or providing material support to the slave trade.

The 1780 Act initially allowed non-resident slaveholders visiting Pennsylvania to hold slaves within the commonwealth for up to six months; however, a loophole was soon identified and exploited. It enabled non-resident slaveholders to void this residency requirement by taking their slave out of Pennsylvania before the six-month deadline took effect. This meant that the residency requirement could be easily voided by simply relocating slaves to neighboring states for one day before returning them to Pennsylvania. The 1788 Amendment, however, prohibited this rotation of enslaved people in and out-of-state to subvert Pennsylvania law.

== Washington's dilemma ==
The 1780 Act had exempted members of the U.S. Congress from prohibitions on the practice of chattel slavery. By 1790, when Philadelphia became the temporary national capital, there were three branches of the federal government operating under the U.S. Constitution. There was confusion about whether or not the Pennsylvania law extended to all federal officials; members of Congress (legislative branch) remained exempt, but there was uncertainty regarding whether justices of the U.S. Supreme Court (judicial branch) and the U.S. President and the U.S. Cabinet (executive branch) would also be exempt. When United States Attorney General Edmund Randolph was required by Pennsylvania law to manumit his slaves, he conveyed this advice to President George Washington through the president's secretary, Tobias Lear:

This being the case, the Attorney General conceived, that after six months residence, your slaves would be upon no better footing than his. But he observed, that if, before the expiration of six months, they could, upon any pretense whatever, be carried or sent out of the State, but for a single day, a new era would commence on their return, from whence the six months must be dated for it requires an entire six months for them to claim that right.

Washington argued privately that his presence in Philadelphia was solely a consequence of the city being the temporary national capital, and that he remained a citizen of Virginia and subject to its laws on slavery. Still, he was careful not to spend six continuous months in Pennsylvania, which might be interpreted as establishing legal residency. Litigating the issue might have clarified his legal status and that of other slaveholding federal officials, but it also would have called attention to his slaveholding in the President's House and put him at risk of losing those slaves to manumission. It was thought that he followed Randolph's advice and knowingly and repeatedly violated the state's 1788 Amendment by rotating the enslaved Africans in his presidential household into and out of Pennsylvania.

There is no record of Washington being challenged. According to Lear, the Pennsylvania Abolition Society seems to have turned a blind eye to the President's actions:

That the Society in this city for the abolition of slavery, had determined to give no advice and take no measures for liberating those Slaves which belonged to the Officers of the general Government or members of Congress. But notwithstanding this, there were not wanting persons who would not only give them (the Slaves) advise [sic], but would use all means to entice them from their masters.

== Federal officials ==
Other slaveholding officers of the executive and judicial branches faced a similar dilemma. Secretary of State Thomas Jefferson swore that he would eventually free his enslaved cook, James Hemings, if Hemings would agree not take advantage of Pennsylvania's abolition law.

Philadelphia's hostile environment for slaveholders was one of the reasons that the Constitution was written to give Congress exclusive control "over such District... as may... become the seat of the government of the United States".

== Aftermath ==
Those enslaved in Pennsylvania before its 1780 Act became law continued to be lifelong slaves, unless manumitted. Also, the 1780 Act and its 1788 Amendment did not apply to fugitive slaves from other states or their children. Pennsylvania tried to extend rights to fugitive slaves through an 1826 personal liberty law, but it and the 1788 Amendment were ruled unconstitutional by the US Supreme Court in Prigg v. Pennsylvania (1842).

Although slavery steadily declined in Pennsylvania, the state that had initially led the way toward abolition tolerated it for decades after it ended in Massachusetts. The 1840 U.S. census listed 47,854 (99.87%) of the state's blacks as free, and 64 (0.13%) as slaves.

== Other states ==
- 1777: The Constitution of Vermont bans slavery.
- 1783: Massachusetts Supreme Court rules slavery illegal based on the 1780 Constitution of Massachusetts. Slavery ended in Massachusetts by the time of the census in 1790.
  - Maine was part of Massachusetts in 1783 and entered the Union as a free state in 1820.
- 1783: New Hampshire Constitution contains a bill of rights that is interpreted as ending slavery. In 1857, a law was approved that formally prohibited slavery.
- 1784: Connecticut begins a gradual abolition of slavery. A law was approved in 1848 that freed any remaining slaves.
- 1784: Rhode Island begins a gradual abolition of slavery.
- 1791: Vermont enters the Union as a free state.
- 1799: New York State begins a gradual abolition of slavery. A law was approved in 1817 that freed all remaining slaves on July 4, 1827.
- 1804: New Jersey begins a gradual abolition of slavery.

New Jersey's gradual abolition law freed future children at birth, but male children of enslaved women could be held until age twenty-five and females until age twenty-one. Those enslaved before passage of the 1804 law remained enslaved for life. The last vestiges of slavery remained in New Jersey until December 6, 1865, when ratification of the Thirteenth Amendment to the United States Constitution ended slavery in the United States. New Jersey's legislature did not approve the Thirteenth Amendment until February 1866, two months after it had been ratified by three-fourths of the states.

== See also ==
- History of slavery in Pennsylvania
- Abolition of slavery timeline
