= Isaac Darlington =

American politician and judge (1781–1839)

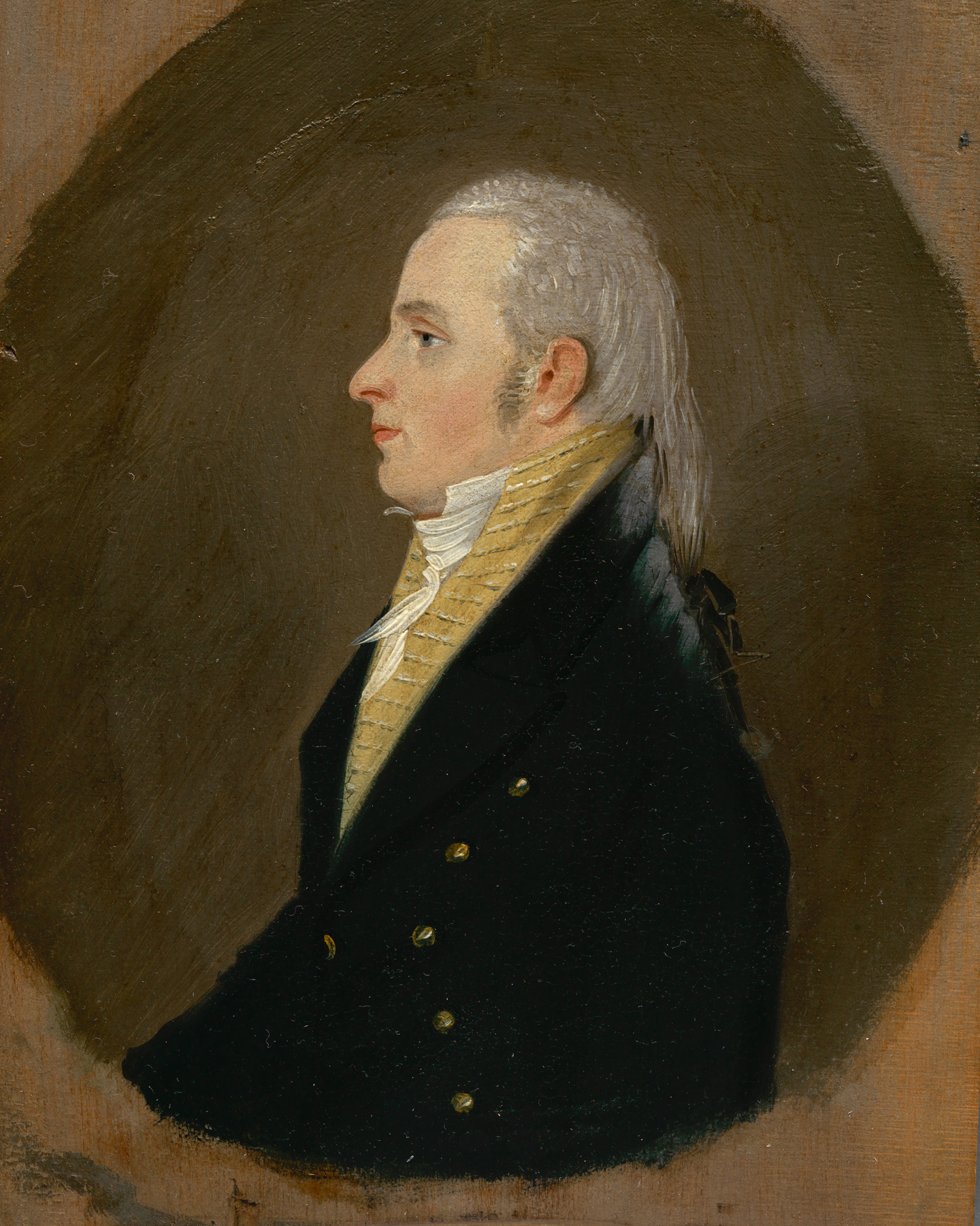
- Portrait by Jacob Eichholtz, c. 1806

Member of the U.S. House of Representatives from Pennsylvania's 2nd district
- In office March 4, 1817 – March 3, 1819 Serving with Roger Davis
- Preceded by: William Darlington and John Hahn
- Succeeded by: William Darlington and Samuel Gross

Member of the Pennsylvania House of Representatives from the Chester County district
- In office 1807–1808 Serving with Joseph Park, James Kelton, William Worthington, George Evans, John G. Bull, Abraham Baily
- Preceded by: John Boyd, Methuselah Davis, James Kelton, Francis Gardner, John G. Bull
- Succeeded by: James Steele, John W. Cunningham, John Ramsay, Jacob Clemmons, Roger Davis

Personal details
- Born: December 13, 1781 Westtown Township, Pennsylvania, U.S.
- Died: April 27, 1839 (aged 57) West Chester, Pennsylvania, U.S.
- Resting place: Friends Burying Ground; Birmingham, Pennsylvania, U.S.
- Party: Federalist
- Relatives: Edward Darlington (cousin); William Darlington (cousin); Smedley Darlington (second cousin)
- Occupation: Politician; judge; lawyer

Isaac Darlington (December 13, 1781 – April 27, 1839) was an American politician and judge from Pennsylvania. He served as a member of the Pennsylvania House of Representatives, representing Chester County from 1807 to 1808. He served was a member of the U.S. House of Representatives from Pennsylvania from 1817 to 1819.

== Early life ==
Isaac Darlington was born on December 13, 1781, in Westtown Township, Pennsylvania. He was the cousin of Edward Darlington and William Darlington, second cousin of Smedley Darlington. Darlington attended Friends School at Birmingham, Pennsylvania. He studied under schoolmaster John Forsythe. He taught at a country school for two or three years. He studied law under Joseph Hemphill, and was admitted to the bar in 1801.

== Career ==
He started a law practice in West Chester. He was a member of the Pennsylvania House of Representatives, representing Chester County from 1807 to 1808. He was elected again in a special election in February 1816 to fill a vacancy. He served as a lieutenant and adjutant of the Second Regiment, Pennsylvania Volunteers in 1814 and 1815.

Darlington was elected as a Federalist to the Fifteenth congress. He declined to be a candidate for renomination in 1818 to the Sixteenth congress. He served from March 4, 1817, to March 3, 1819.

Darlington was appointed deputy attorney general for Chester County, Pennsylvania in 1820 and became presiding judge of the judicial district comprising the counties of Chester and Delaware from May 1821 until his death.

== Personal life ==
Darlington died at his home in West Chester on April 27, 1839. He was interred in the Friends Burying Ground in Birmingham.

His son-in-law was Thomas S. Bell, a state senator and justice of the Supreme Court of Pennsylvania.

U.S. House of Representatives
Preceded by William Darlington; John Hahn	Member of the U.S. House of Representatives from Pennsylvania's 2nd congressional district 1817–1819 alongside: Roger Davis	Succeeded by William Darlington; Samuel Gross
