= Pennsylvania's 3rd congressional district =

U.S. House district for Pennsylvania

Coordinates: 41°24′27″N 80°00′13″W

- Interactive map of district boundaries since January 3, 2023 (Philadelphia outlined in red)
- Representative: Dwight Evans; D–Philadelphia
- Area: 53.1 mi^{2} (138 km^{2})
- Distribution: 100.00% urban; 0.00% rural
- Population (2025): 743,776
- Median household income: $68,026
- Ethnicity: 49.9% Black; 33.2% White; 7.5% Two or more races; 7.3% Hispanic; 6.4% Asian; 2.5% other
- Cook PVI: D+40

Pennsylvania's third congressional district includes several areas of the city of Philadelphia, including West Philadelphia, most of Center City, Northwest Philadelphia, and parts of North Philadelphia. It has been represented by Democrat Dwight Evans since 2019. With a Cook Partisan Voting Index rating of D+40, it is the most Democratic district in both Pennsylvania and the United States, as well as the most partisan (the most Republican district, Alabama's 4th, has a rating of R+33).

Prior to 2018, the district was located in the northwestern part of the state and included the cities of Erie, Sharon, Hermitage, Butler and Meadville. The Supreme Court of Pennsylvania redrew this district in February 2018 after ruling the previous map unconstitutional. The new third district is similar to the old second district and was heavily Democratic for the 2018 election and representation thereafter. Dwight Evans, the incumbent from the old 2nd district, ran for re-election in the new 3rd District.

The current version of the 3rd, like the old 2nd, is heavily Democratic and, according to the Census Bureau's 2023 American Community Survey, almost half-black. In 2020, the district gave Joe Biden 91 percent of the vote, his best showing in the nation.

== Recent election results from statewide races ==
Year	Office	Results
2008	President	Obama 91–9%
2008	Attorney General	Morganelli 88–12%
2008	Auditor General	Wagner 92–8%
2010	Senate	Sestak 92–8%
2010	Governor	Onorato 91–9%
2012	President	Obama 92–8%
2012	Senate	Casey Jr. 92–8%
2014	Governor	Wolf 93–7%
2016	President	Clinton 90–8%
2016	Senate	McGinty 89–10%
2016	Attorney General	Shapiro 91–9%
2016	Auditor General	DePasquale 88–9%
2016	Treasurer	Torsella 89–9%
2018	Senate	Casey Jr. 92–6%
2018	Governor	Wolf 93–6%
2020	President	Biden 90–9%
2020	Attorney General	Shapiro 88–9%
2020	Auditor General	Ahmad 87–10%
2020	Treasurer	Torsella 87–10%
2022	Senate	Fetterman 90–8%
2022	Governor	Shapiro 92–6%
2024	President	Harris 88–11%
2024	Senate	Casey Jr. 87–10%
2024	Attorney General	DePasquale 85–12%
2024	Auditor General	Kenyatta 88–11%
2024	Treasurer	McClelland 87–12%

== History ==
From 1983 to 2003, the district was located in Northeast Philadelphia and was represented by Rep. Robert Borski; much of that district was merged with the 13th district after the 2000 census, while the 3rd was reconfigured to take in most of the territory in the old 21st district. This version of the 3rd supported President George W. Bush in 2004 as well as John McCain in 2008, Mitt Romney in 2012 and Donald Trump in 2016.

== Composition ==
Philadelphia County (1)

Philadelphia (part; also 2nd and 5th)

Philadelphia neighborhoods in the 3rd district include:

- Allegheny West
- Allen Lane
- Andorra
- Angora
- Belmont Village
- Brewerytown
- Carroll Park
- Cathedral Park
- Cecil B. Moore
- Cedar Park
- Cedarbrook
- Centennial Park
- Chestnut Hill
- Cobbs Creek
- Devil's Pocket
- Dickinson Narrows
- East Falls
- East Germantown
- East Parkside
- Fairmount
- Fairmount Park
- Filter Square
- Forgotten Bottom
- Francisville
- Germantown
- Grays Ferry
- Haddington
- Haverford North
- Kingsessing
- Logan/Ogontz/Fern Rock (part; also 2nd)
- Lower Moyamensing
- Manayunk
- Mantua
- Mill Creek
- Morton
- Mt. Airy
- Newbold
- Nicetown-Tioga
- North Philadelphia West
- Northwest Philadelphia
- Ogontz
- Overbrook Farms
- Overbrook Park
- Passyunk Square
- Penn Knox
- Point Breeze
- Powelton Village
- Queen Village
- Roxborough
- Schuylkill
- Sharswood
- Shawmont Valley
- South Philadelphia
- Southwest Center City
- Spring Garden
- Spruce Hill
- Stenton
- Strawberry Mansion
- University City
- Walnut Hill
- West Oak Lane
- West Passyunk
- West Philadelphia
- West Powelton
- Whitman
- Wissahickon
- Wister
- Wynnefield Heights

== List of members representing the district ==
The district was organized from Pennsylvania's at-large congressional district in 1791

=== 1791–1793: one seat ===
Cong ress	Representative	Party	Years	Electoral history
District first established March 4, 1791
2nd	Israel Jacobs (Providence Township)	Pro-Administration	March 4, 1791 – March 3, 1793	Elected in 1791. Redistricted to the at-large district and lost re-election.

=== 1795–1803: one seat ===
Member	Party	Years	Cong ress	Electoral history
Richard Thomas (West Whiteland)	Federalist	March 4, 1795 – March 3, 1801	4th 5th 6th	Elected in 1794. Re-elected in 1796. Re-elected in 1798. Retired.
Joseph Hemphill (Philadelphia)	Federalist	March 4, 1801 – March 3, 1803	7th	Elected in 1800. Lost re-election.

=== 1803–1813: three seats ===
Cong ress	Years	Seat A			Seat B			Seat C		
Cong ress	Years	Representative	Party	Electoral history	Representative	Party	Electoral history	Representative	Party	Electoral history
8th	March 4, 1803 – March 3, 1805	Joseph Hiester (West Chester)	Democratic-Republican	Redistricted from the 5th district and re-elected in 1802. Retired.	Isaac Anderson (Charlestown Township)	Democratic-Republican	Elected in 1802. Re-elected in 1804. Retired.	John Whitehill (Salisbury Township)	Democratic-Republican	Elected in 1802. Re-elected in 1804. Lost re-election.
9th	March 4, 1805 – December 19, 1806	Christian Lower (Tulpehocken)	Democratic-Republican	Elected in 1804. Died.	Isaac Anderson (Charlestown Township)	Democratic-Republican	Elected in 1802. Re-elected in 1804. Retired.	John Whitehill (Salisbury Township)	Democratic-Republican	Elected in 1802. Re-elected in 1804. Lost re-election.
9th	December 19, 1806 – March 3, 1807	Vacant			Isaac Anderson (Charlestown Township)	Democratic-Republican	Elected in 1802. Re-elected in 1804. Retired.	John Whitehill (Salisbury Township)	Democratic-Republican	Elected in 1802. Re-elected in 1804. Lost re-election.
10th	March 4, 1807 – March 3, 1809	John Hiester (Parker Ford)	Democratic-Republican	Elected in 1806. Retired.	Matthias Richards (Pottstown)	Democratic-Republican	Elected in 1806. Re-elected in 1808. Retired.	Robert Jenkins (Churchtown)	Federalist	Elected in 1806. Re-elected in 1808. Retired.
11th	March 4, 1809 – March 3, 1811	Daniel Hiester (West Chester)	Democratic-Republican	Re-elected in 1808. Lost re-election.	Matthias Richards (Pottstown)	Democratic-Republican	Elected in 1806. Re-elected in 1808. Retired.	Robert Jenkins (Churchtown)	Federalist	Elected in 1806. Re-elected in 1808. Retired.
12th	March 4, 1811 – March 3, 1813	Roger Davis (Charlestown)	Democratic-Republican	Elected in 1810. Redistricted to the 2nd district.	John M. Hyneman (Reading)	Democratic-Republican	Elected in 1810. Redistricted to the 7th district.	Joseph Lefever (Paradise)	Democratic-Republican	Elected in 1810. Retired.

=== 1813–1823: two seats ===
Cong ress	Years	Seat A			Seat B		
Cong ress	Years	Representative	Party	Electoral history	Representative	Party	Electoral history
13th	March 4, 1813 – August 2, 1813	John Gloninger (Lebanon)	Federalist	Elected in 1812. Resigned to become associate judge of Lebanon County.	James Whitehill (Camp Hill)	Democratic-Republican	Elected in 1812. Resigned.
13th	August 2, 1813 – October 12, 1813	Vacant			James Whitehill (Camp Hill)	Democratic-Republican	Elected in 1812. Resigned.
13th	October 12, 1813 – September 1, 1814	Edward Crouch (Paxtang)	Democratic-Republican	Elected to finish Gloninger's term. Retired.	James Whitehill (Camp Hill)	Democratic-Republican	Elected in 1812. Resigned.
13th	September 1, 1814 – October 11, 1814	Edward Crouch (Paxtang)	Democratic-Republican	Elected to finish Gloninger's term. Retired.	Vacant		
13th	October 11, 1814 – March 3, 1815	Edward Crouch (Paxtang)	Democratic-Republican	Elected to finish Gloninger's term. Retired.	Amos Slaymaker (Harrisburg)	Federalist	Elected to finish Whitehill's term. Re-elected in 1814. Resigned.
14th	March 4, 1815 – July 3, 1815	John Whiteside (Lancaster)	Democratic-Republican	Elected in 1814. Re-elected in 1816. Lost re-election.	Amos Slaymaker (Harrisburg)	Federalist	Elected to finish Whitehill's term. Re-elected in 1814. Resigned.
14th	July 3, 1815 – October 10, 1815	John Whiteside (Lancaster)	Democratic-Republican	Elected in 1814. Re-elected in 1816. Lost re-election.	Vacant		
14th	October 10, 1815 – March 3, 1817	John Whiteside (Lancaster)	Democratic-Republican	Elected in 1814. Re-elected in 1816. Lost re-election.	James M. Wallace (Hummelstown)	Democratic-Republican	Elected to finish Slaymaker's term. Re-elected in 1816. Re-elected in 1818. Lost re-election.
15th	March 4, 1817 – March 3, 1819	John Whiteside (Lancaster)	Democratic-Republican	Elected in 1814. Re-elected in 1816. Lost re-election.	James M. Wallace (Hummelstown)	Democratic-Republican	Elected to finish Slaymaker's term. Re-elected in 1816. Re-elected in 1818. Lost re-election.
16th	March 4, 1819 – March 3, 1821	Jacob Hibshman (Ephrata)	Democratic-Republican	Elected in 1818. Lost re-election.	James M. Wallace (Hummelstown)	Democratic-Republican	Elected to finish Slaymaker's term. Re-elected in 1816. Re-elected in 1818. Lost re-election.
17th	March 4, 1821 – March 3, 1823	James Buchanan (Lancaster)	Federalist	Elected in 1820. Redistricted to the 4th district.	John Phillips (Hummelstown)	Federalist	Elected in 1820. Redistricted to the 6th district and lost re-election.

=== 1823–present: one seat ===
The district was reorganized in 1823 to have one seat.

Member	Party	Years	Cong ress	Electoral history	District location
Daniel H. Miller (Philadelphia)	Democratic-Republican	March 4, 1823 – March 3, 1825	18th 19th 20th 21st	Elected in 1822. Re-elected in 1824. Re-elected in 1826. Re-elected in 1828. Lost re-election.	1823–1833 [data missing]
Daniel H. Miller (Philadelphia)	Jacksonian	March 4, 1825 – March 3, 1831	18th 19th 20th 21st	Elected in 1822. Re-elected in 1824. Re-elected in 1826. Re-elected in 1828. Lost re-election.	1823–1833 [data missing]
John G. Watmough (Philadelphia)	Anti-Jacksonian	March 4, 1831 – March 3, 1835	22nd 23rd	Elected in 1830. Re-elected in 1832. Lost re-election.	1823–1833 [data missing]
John G. Watmough (Philadelphia)	Anti-Jacksonian	March 4, 1831 – March 3, 1835	22nd 23rd	Elected in 1830. Re-elected in 1832. Lost re-election.	1833–1843 [data missing]
Michael W. Ash (Philadelphia)	Jacksonian	March 4, 1835 – March 3, 1837	24th	Elected in 1834. Retired.	1833–1843 [data missing]
Francis J. Harper (Frankford)	Democratic	March 4, 1837 – March 18, 1837	25th	Elected in 1836. Died.	1833–1843 [data missing]
Vacant		March 18, 1837 – June 29, 1837	25th		1833–1843 [data missing]
Charles Naylor (Philadelphia)	Whig	June 29, 1837 – March 3, 1841	26th	Elected to finish Harper's term and seated September 4, 1837. Re-elected in 1838. [data missing]	1833–1843 [data missing]
Charles J. Ingersoll (Philadelphia)	Democratic	March 4, 1841 – March 3, 1843	27th	Elected in 1840. Redistricted to the 4th district.	1833–1843 [data missing]
John T. Smith (Philadelphia)	Democratic	March 4, 1843 – March 3, 1845	28th	Elected in 1843. [data missing]	1843–1853 [data missing]
John H. Campbell (Philadelphia)	American	March 4, 1845 – March 3, 1847	29th	Elected in 1844. Retired.	1843–1853 [data missing]
Charles Brown (Philadelphia)	Democratic	March 4, 1847 – March 3, 1849	30th	Elected in 1846. Retired.	1843–1853 [data missing]
Henry D. Moore (Philadelphia)	Whig	March 4, 1849 – March 3, 1853	31st 32nd	Elected in 1848. Re-elected in 1850. Retired.	1843–1853 [data missing]
John Robbins (Philadelphia)	Democratic	March 4, 1853 – March 3, 1855	33rd	Redistricted from the 4th district and re-elected in 1852. Retired.	1853–1863
William Millward (Philadelphia)	Opposition	March 4, 1855 – March 3, 1857	34th	Elected in 1854. Lost re-election as a Union candidate.	1853–1863
James Landy (Philadelphia)	Democratic	March 4, 1857 – March 3, 1859	35th	Elected in 1856. Lost re-election.	1853–1863
John P. Verree (Philadelphia)	Republican	March 4, 1859 – March 3, 1863	36th 37th	Elected in 1858. Re-elected in 1860. Retired.	1853–1863
Leonard Myers (Philadelphia)	Republican	March 4, 1863 – March 3, 1869	38th 39th 40th	Elected in 1862. Re-elected in 1864. Re-elected in 1866..	1863–1869
John Moffet (Philadelphia)	Democratic	March 4, 1869 – April 9, 1869	40th	Lost contested election.	1869–1873
Leonard Myers (Philadelphia)	Republican	April 9, 1869 – March 3, 1875	41st 42nd 43rd	Re-elected in 1868. Re-elected in 1870. Re-elected in 1872. Lost re-election.	1869–1873
Leonard Myers (Philadelphia)	Republican	April 9, 1869 – March 3, 1875	41st 42nd 43rd	Re-elected in 1868. Re-elected in 1870. Re-elected in 1872. Lost re-election.	1873–1875 [data missing]
Samuel J. Randall (Philadelphia)	Democratic	March 4, 1875 – April 13, 1890	44th 45th 46th 47th 48th 49th 50th 51st	Redistricted from the 1st district and re-elected in 1874. Re-elected in 1876. Re-elected in 1878. Re-elected in 1880. Re-elected in 1882. Re-elected in 1884. Re-elected in 1886. Re-elected in 1888. Died.	
Samuel J. Randall (Philadelphia)	Democratic	March 4, 1875 – April 13, 1890	44th 45th 46th 47th 48th 49th 50th 51st	Redistricted from the 1st district and re-elected in 1874. Re-elected in 1876. Re-elected in 1878. Re-elected in 1880. Re-elected in 1882. Re-elected in 1884. Re-elected in 1886. Re-elected in 1888. Died.	1875–1883 [data missing]
Samuel J. Randall (Philadelphia)	Democratic	March 4, 1875 – April 13, 1890	44th 45th 46th 47th 48th 49th 50th 51st	Redistricted from the 1st district and re-elected in 1874. Re-elected in 1876. Re-elected in 1878. Re-elected in 1880. Re-elected in 1882. Re-elected in 1884. Re-elected in 1886. Re-elected in 1888. Died.	1883–1889 [data missing]
Samuel J. Randall (Philadelphia)	Democratic	March 4, 1875 – April 13, 1890	44th 45th 46th 47th 48th 49th 50th 51st	Redistricted from the 1st district and re-elected in 1874. Re-elected in 1876. Re-elected in 1878. Re-elected in 1880. Re-elected in 1882. Re-elected in 1884. Re-elected in 1886. Re-elected in 1888. Died.	1889–1893 [data missing]
Vacant		April 13, 1890 – May 20, 1890	51st		1889–1893 [data missing]
Richard Vaux (Philadelphia)	Democratic	May 20, 1890 – March 3, 1891	51st	Elected to finish Randall's term. Lost re-election.	1889–1893 [data missing]
William McAleer (Philadelphia)	Democratic	March 4, 1891 – March 3, 1895	52nd 53rd	Elected in 1890. Re-elected in 1892. Lost re-election.	1889–1893 [data missing]
William McAleer (Philadelphia)	Democratic	March 4, 1891 – March 3, 1895	52nd 53rd	Elected in 1890. Re-elected in 1892. Lost re-election.	1893–1903 [data missing]
Frederick Halterman (Philadelphia)	Republican	March 4, 1895 – March 3, 1897	54th	Elected in 1894. [data missing]	1893–1903 [data missing]
William McAleer (Philadelphia)	Democratic	March 4, 1897 – March 3, 1901	55th 56th	Elected in 1896. Re-elected in 1898. Lost re-election.	1893–1903 [data missing]
Henry Burk (Philadelphia)	Republican	March 4, 1901 – December 5, 1903	57th 58th	Elected in 1900. Re-elected in 1902. Died.	1893–1903 [data missing]
Henry Burk (Philadelphia)	Republican	March 4, 1901 – December 5, 1903	57th 58th	Elected in 1900. Re-elected in 1902. Died.	1903–1913 [data missing]
Vacant		December 5, 1903 – February 16, 1904	58th		1903–1913 [data missing]
George A. Castor (Philadelphia)	Republican	February 16, 1904 – February 19, 1906	58th 59th	Elected to finish Burk's term. Re-elected in 1904. Died.	1903–1913 [data missing]
Vacant		February 19, 1906 – November 6, 1906	59th		1903–1913 [data missing]
J. Hampton Moore (Philadelphia)	Republican	November 6, 1906 – January 4, 1920	59th 60th 61st 62nd 63rd 64th 65th 66th	Elected to finish Castor's term. Re-elected in 1906. Re-elected in 1908. Re-elected in 1910. Re-elected in 1912. Re-elected in 1914. Re-elected in 1916. Re-elected in 1918. Resigned to become Mayor of Philadelphia.	1903–1913 [data missing]
J. Hampton Moore (Philadelphia)	Republican	November 6, 1906 – January 4, 1920	59th 60th 61st 62nd 63rd 64th 65th 66th	Elected to finish Castor's term. Re-elected in 1906. Re-elected in 1908. Re-elected in 1910. Re-elected in 1912. Re-elected in 1914. Re-elected in 1916. Re-elected in 1918. Resigned to become Mayor of Philadelphia.	1913–1923
Harry C. Ransley (Philadelphia)	Republican	November 2, 1920 – March 3, 1933	66th 67th 68th 69th 70th 71st 72nd	Elected to finish Moore's term. Re-elected in 1920. Re-elected in 1922. Re-elected in 1924. Re-elected in 1926. Re-elected in 1928. Re-elected in 1930. Redistricted to the 1st district.	1913–1923
Harry C. Ransley (Philadelphia)	Republican	November 2, 1920 – March 3, 1933	66th 67th 68th 69th 70th 71st 72nd	Elected to finish Moore's term. Re-elected in 1920. Re-elected in 1922. Re-elected in 1924. Re-elected in 1926. Re-elected in 1928. Re-elected in 1930. Redistricted to the 1st district.	1923–1933
Alfred M. Waldron (Philadelphia)	Republican	March 4, 1933 – January 3, 1935	73rd	Elected in 1932. [data missing]	1933–1943
Clare G. Fenerty (Philadelphia)	Republican	January 3, 1935 – January 3, 1937	74th	Elected in 1934. [data missing]	1933–1943
Michael J. Bradley (Philadelphia)	Democratic	January 3, 1937 – January 3, 1947	75th 76th 77th 78th 79th	Elected in 1936. Re-elected in 1938. Re-elected in 1940. Re-elected in 1942. Re-elected in 1944. [data missing]	1933–1943
Michael J. Bradley (Philadelphia)	Democratic	January 3, 1937 – January 3, 1947	75th 76th 77th 78th 79th	Elected in 1936. Re-elected in 1938. Re-elected in 1940. Re-elected in 1942. Re-elected in 1944. [data missing]	1943–1945
Michael J. Bradley (Philadelphia)	Democratic	January 3, 1937 – January 3, 1947	75th 76th 77th 78th 79th	Elected in 1936. Re-elected in 1938. Re-elected in 1940. Re-elected in 1942. Re-elected in 1944. [data missing]	1945–1953
Hardie Scott (Philadelphia)	Republican	January 3, 1947 – January 3, 1953	80th 81st 82nd	Elected in 1946. Re-elected in 1948. Re-elected in 1950. [data missing]	1945–1953
James A. Byrne (Philadelphia)	Democratic	January 3, 1953 – January 3, 1973	83rd 84th 85th 86th 87th 88th 89th 90th 91st 92nd	Elected in 1952. Re-elected in 1954. Re-elected in 1956. Re-elected in 1958. Re-elected in 1960. Re-elected in 1962. Re-elected in 1964. Re-elected in 1966. Re-elected in 1968. Re-elected in 1970. [data missing]	1953–1963
James A. Byrne (Philadelphia)	Democratic	January 3, 1953 – January 3, 1973	83rd 84th 85th 86th 87th 88th 89th 90th 91st 92nd	Elected in 1952. Re-elected in 1954. Re-elected in 1956. Re-elected in 1958. Re-elected in 1960. Re-elected in 1962. Re-elected in 1964. Re-elected in 1966. Re-elected in 1968. Re-elected in 1970. [data missing]	1963–1973
William J. Green III (Philadelphia)	Democratic	January 3, 1973 – January 3, 1977	93rd 94th	Redistricted from the 5th district and re-elected in 1972. Re-elected in 1974. [data missing]	1973–1983
Raymond Lederer (Philadelphia)	Democratic	January 3, 1977 – April 29, 1981	95th 96th 97th	Elected in 1976. Re-elected in 1978. Re-elected in 1980. Resigned.	1973–1983
Vacant		April 29, 1981 – July 21, 1981	97th		1973–1983
Joseph F. Smith (Philadelphia)	Democratic	July 21, 1981 – January 3, 1983	97th	Elected to finish Lederer's term. Redistricted to the 1st district and lost renomination.	1973–1983
Robert A. Borski Jr. (Philadelphia)	Democratic	January 3, 1983 – January 3, 2003	98th 99th 100th 101st 102nd 103rd 104th 105th 106th 107th	Elected in 1982. Re-elected in 1984. Re-elected in 1986. Re-elected in 1988. Re-elected in 1990. Re-elected in 1992. Re-elected in 1994. Re-elected in 1996. Re-elected in 1998. Re-elected in 2000. Redistricted to the 13th district and retired.	1983–1989
Robert A. Borski Jr. (Philadelphia)	Democratic	January 3, 1983 – January 3, 2003	98th 99th 100th 101st 102nd 103rd 104th 105th 106th 107th	Elected in 1982. Re-elected in 1984. Re-elected in 1986. Re-elected in 1988. Re-elected in 1990. Re-elected in 1992. Re-elected in 1994. Re-elected in 1996. Re-elected in 1998. Re-elected in 2000. Redistricted to the 13th district and retired.	1989–1993
Robert A. Borski Jr. (Philadelphia)	Democratic	January 3, 1983 – January 3, 2003	98th 99th 100th 101st 102nd 103rd 104th 105th 106th 107th	Elected in 1982. Re-elected in 1984. Re-elected in 1986. Re-elected in 1988. Re-elected in 1990. Re-elected in 1992. Re-elected in 1994. Re-elected in 1996. Re-elected in 1998. Re-elected in 2000. Redistricted to the 13th district and retired.	1993–2003
Phil English (Erie)	Republican	January 3, 2003 – January 3, 2009	108th 109th 110th	Redistricted from the 21st district and re-elected in 2002. Re-elected in 2004. Re-elected in 2006. Lost re-election.	2003–2013
Kathy Dahlkemper (Erie)	Democratic	January 3, 2009 – January 3, 2011	111th	Elected in 2008. Lost re-election.	2003–2013
Mike Kelly (Butler)	Republican	January 3, 2011 – January 3, 2019	112th 113th 114th 115th	Elected in 2010. Re-elected in 2012. Re-elected in 2014. Re-elected in 2016. Redistricted to the 16th district.	2003–2013
Mike Kelly (Butler)	Republican	January 3, 2011 – January 3, 2019	112th 113th 114th 115th	Elected in 2010. Re-elected in 2012. Re-elected in 2014. Re-elected in 2016. Redistricted to the 16th district.	2013–2019
Dwight Evans (Philadelphia)	Democratic	January 3, 2019 – present	116th 117th 118th 119th	Redistricted from the 2nd district and re-elected in 2018. Re-elected in 2020. Re-elected in 2022. Re-elected in 2024. Retiring at the end of term.	2019–2023
Dwight Evans (Philadelphia)	Democratic	January 3, 2019 – present	116th 117th 118th 119th	Redistricted from the 2nd district and re-elected in 2018. Re-elected in 2020. Re-elected in 2022. Re-elected in 2024. Retiring at the end of term.	2023–present
Chris Rabb (Philadelphia)	Democratic	Assuming office on January 3, 2027		Elected in 2026.	2023–present

== Recent elections ==
U.S. House election, 2000: Pennsylvania District 3
Party	Candidate	Votes	%
Democratic	Robert A. Borski Jr. (incumbent)	130,528	68.8%
Republican	Charles F. Dougherty	59,343	31.3%
Total votes		189,871	100.0%
Democratic hold			

U.S. House election, 2002: Pennsylvania District 3
Party	Candidate	Votes	%
Republican	Phil English	116,763	77.7%
Green	Anndrea M. Benson	33,554	22.3%
Total votes		150,317	100.0%
Republican hold			

U.S. House election, 2004: Pennsylvania District 3
Party	Candidate	Votes	%
Republican	Phil English (incumbent)	166,580	60.1%
Democratic	Steven Porter	110,684	39.9%
Total votes		277,264	100.0%
Republican hold			

U.S. House elections in Pennsylvania, 2006: Pennsylvania District 3
Party	Candidate	Votes	%
Republican	Phil English (incumbent)	108,525	53.6%
Democratic	Steven Porter	85,110	42.1%
Constitution	Timothy Hagberg	8,706	4.3%
Total votes		202,341	100.0%
Republican hold			

U.S. House election, 2008: Pennsylvania District 3
Party	Candidate	Votes	%
Democratic	Kathy Dahlkemper	146,846	51.2%
Republican	Phil English (incumbent)	139,757	48.8%
Total votes		286,603	100.0%
Democratic gain from Republican			

U.S. House election, 2010: Pennsylvania District 3
Party	Candidate	Votes	%
Republican	Mike Kelly	109,909	55.7%
Democratic	Kathy Dahlkemper (incumbent)	88,924	44.3%
Total votes		197,320	100.0%
Republican gain from Democratic			

U.S. House election, 2012: Pennsylvania District 3
Party	Candidate	Votes	%
Republican	Mike Kelly (incumbent)	165,826	54.82%
Democratic	Missa Eaton	123,933	40.97%
Independent	Steven Porter	12,755	4.22%
Total votes		302,514	100.0%
Republican hold			

U.S. House election, 2014: Pennsylvania District 3
Party	Candidate	Votes	%
Republican	Mike Kelly (incumbent)	113,859	60.63%
Democratic	Daniel Lavallee	73,931	39.37%
Total votes		187,790	100.0%
Republican hold			

U.S. House election, 2016: Pennsylvania District 3
Party	Candidate	Votes	%
Republican	Mike Kelly (incumbent)	244,893	100%
Total votes		244,893	100.0%
Republican hold			

U.S. House election, 2018: Pennsylvania District 3
Party	Candidate	Votes	%
Democratic	Dwight Evans	287,610	93.4%
Republican	Bryan E. Leib	20,387	6.6%
Total votes		307,997	100.0%
Democratic hold			

U.S. House election, 2020: Pennsylvania District 3
Party	Candidate	Votes	%
Democratic	Dwight Evans (incumbent)	341,708	91.0
Republican	Michael Harvey	33,671	9.0
Total votes		375,379	100.0
Democratic hold			

U.S. House election, 2022: Pennsylvania District 3
Party	Candidate	Votes	%
Democratic	Dwight Evans (incumbent)	251,115	95.1
Socialist Workers	Christopher Hoeppner	12,820	4.9
Total votes		263,935	100.0
Democratic hold			

U.S. House election, 2024: Pennsylvania District 3
Party	Candidate	Votes	%
Democratic	Dwight Evans (incumbent)	340,223	100
Democratic hold			

== See also ==
- List of United States congressional districts
- Pennsylvania's congressional districts

U.S. House of Representatives
Preceded by Indiana's 3rd congressional district	Home district of the speaker of the House; December 4, 1876 – March 4, 1881	Succeeded by Ohio's 8th congressional district
