= Patrick Anderson =

Patrick Anderson may refer to:

- Patrick Anderson (physician) (died 1635), physician and author
- Patrick Anderson of Walston, minister and prisoner on the Bass Rock
- Patrick Anderson (Jesuit) (1575–1624), Scottish Jesuit and partisan of Mary Queen of Scots
- Patrick Anderson (poet) (1915–1979), English-born Canadian poet
- Patrick Anderson (assemblyman) (1719–1793), officer in French and Indian War and American Revolution, member of the Pennsylvania Assembly
- Patrick Anderson (Oklahoma politician) (born 1967), Republican United States politician from the U.S. state of Oklahoma
- Patrick Anderson, former president of the Jamaica Football Federation
- Patrick Anderson (wheelchair basketball) (born 1979), Canadian wheelchair basketball player
- Patrick Helland Anderson (born 2004), Norwegian handball player

== See also ==
- Patrik Andersson (disambiguation)
