= Levi Pawling =

American politician (1773–1845)

Levi Pawling (July 25, 1773 – September 7, 1845) was an American politician from Pennsylvania who served as a member of the U.S. House of Representatives for Pennsylvania's 2nd congressional district from 1817 to 1819.

Levi Pawling was born in Fatland, Pennsylvania, near Norristown. He graduated from the University of Pennsylvania at Philadelphia, and moved to Norristown in November 1795. He studied law, was admitted to the bar in 1795 and practiced in Norristown and Philadelphia. He served as trustee of lands belonging to the University of Pennsylvania, and was appointed chairman of the commission to raise funds relative to lock navigation on the Schuylkill River in 1816.

Pawling was elected as a Federalist to the Fifteenth Congress. He was elected burgess of Norristown in 1818 and served as president of the board of directors of the Bank of Montgomery County. He died in Norristown in 1845. Interment in St. John's Protestant Episcopal Cemetery.

== Sources ==
- United States Congress. "Levi Pawling (id: P000147)". Biographical Directory of the United States Congress.
- The Political Graveyard

U.S. House of Representatives
Preceded by William Darlington; John Hahn	Member of the U.S. House of Representatives from Pennsylvania's 2nd congressional district 1817–1819 alongside: Isaac Darlington	Succeeded by William Darlington; Samuel Gross
