= Whitehill–Wise family =

The Whitehill–Wise family is a family of politicians from the United States.

== Members ==
- John Whitehill 1729–1815, Judge in Pennsylvania 1777, member of the Pennsylvania State Legislature 1780, U.S. Representative from Pennsylvania 1803–1807.
- Robert Whitehill 1738–1813, member of the Pennsylvania State Legislature, U.S. Representative from Pennsylvania 1805–1813. Brother of John Whitehill.
  - James Whitehill 1762–1822, Judge in Pennsylvania 1811, U.S. Representative from Pennsylvania 1813. Son of John Whitehill.
    - John C. Kunkel 1898–1970, U.S. Representative from Pennsylvania 1939–1951, 1961–1967, candidate for U.S. Senator from Pennsylvania 1950. Great-great-grandson of Robert Whitehill and grandson of John Christian Kunkel.
- Jonathan Sergeant 1746–1793, Delegate to the Continental Congress from Pennsylvania 1776, Pennsylvania Attorney General 1777.
  - John Sergeant 1779–1852, U.S. Representative from Pennsylvania 1815–1823, 1827–1829, 1837–1841, candidate for Vice President of the United States 1832. Son of Jonathan Sergeant, great-grandfather of John C. Kunkel.
    - Henry A. Wise 1806–1876, U.S. Representative from Virginia 1833–1844, U.S. Minister to Brazil 1844–1847, delegate to the Virginia Constitutional Convention 1850, Governor of Virginia 1856–1859. Son-in-law of John Sergeant.
      - Richard Alsop Wise 1843–1900, member of the Virginia State Legislature, U.S. Representative from Virginia 1898–1899 1900. Son of Henry A. Wise.
      - John Sergeant Wise 1846–1913, U.S. District Attorney for Eastern District of Virginia 1882–1883, U.S. Representative from Virginia 1883–1885, candidate for Governor of Virginia 1885. Son of Henry A. Wise.
      - George D. Wise 1831–1898, U.S. Representative from Virginia 1881–1885. Nephew of Henry A. Wise.
