= Samuel Gross (politician) =

American politician

Member of the U.S. House of Representatives from Pennsylvania's 2nd district
- In office March 4, 1819 – March 3, 1823
- Preceded by: See below
- Succeeded by: Joseph Hemphill

Member of the Pennsylvania Senate
- In office 1811–1815

Member of the Pennsylvania House of Representatives
- In office 1803–1807

Personal details
- Born: November 10, 1776 Montgomery County, Pennsylvania
- Died: March 19, 1839 (aged 62) Trappe, Pennsylvania
- Party: Democratic-Republican

Samuel Gross (November 10, 1776 – March 19, 1839) was an American politician from Pennsylvania who served as a Republican member of the United States House of Representatives for Pennsylvania's 2nd congressional district from 1819 to 1823.

== Biography ==
Born in Upper Providence Township in Montgomery County, Pennsylvania, he engaged in agricultural pursuits. He served as a member of the Pennsylvania House of Representatives 1803–1807; served in the Pennsylvania State Senate 1811–1815; was elected as a Republican to the Sixteenth and Seventeenth Congresses (March 4, 1819 – March 4, 1823). He died in Trappe, Pennsylvania.

U.S. House of Representatives
Preceded by Isaac Darlington; Levi Pawling	Member of the U.S. House of Representatives from Pennsylvania's 2nd congressional district 1819–1823 alongside: William Darlington	Succeeded by Joseph Hemphill
