= William Darlington =

American physician, botanist, and politician (1782–1863)

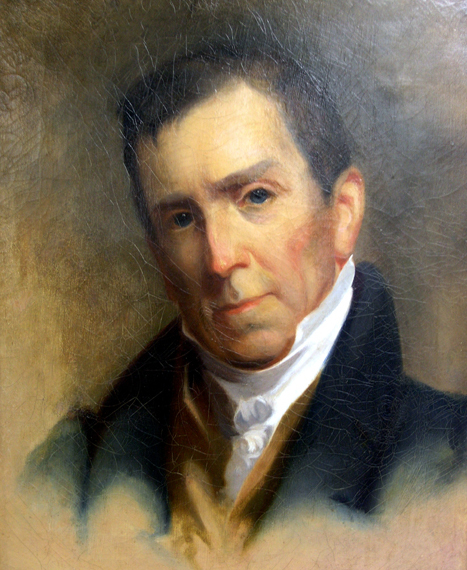

Member of the U.S. House of Representatives from Pennsylvania's 2nd district
- In office March 4, 1819 – March 3, 1823
- Preceded by: See below
- Succeeded by: See below
- In office March 4, 1815 – March 3, 1817
- Preceded by: See below
- Succeeded by: See below

Personal details
- Born: April 28, 1782 Birmingham Township, Chester County, Pennsylvania
- Died: April 23, 1863 (aged 80) West Chester, Pennsylvania
- Resting place: Oaklands Cemetery
- Party: Democratic-Republican
- Education: University of Pennsylvania School of Medicine
- Occupation: Physician, botanist, politician

William Darlington (April 28, 1782 – April 23, 1863) was an American medical doctor, botanist, and politician who served as a Democratic-Republican member of the U.S. House of Representatives for Pennsylvania's 2nd congressional district from 1819 to 1823.

== Early life and education ==
William Darlington (cousin of Edward Darlington and Isaac Darlington, second cousin of Smedley Darlington) was born in Birmingham, Chester County, Pennsylvania. He attended the Friends School at Birmingham and spent his youth on a farm. He became a botanist at an early age, studied medicine, and graduated from the medical department of the University of Pennsylvania in Philadelphia in 1804. He went to the East Indies as ship's surgeon in 1806. He returned to West Chester, near Birmingham, in 1807 and was a practicing medical doctor there for a number of years. He raised a company of volunteers at the beginning of the War of 1812 and served as major of a volunteer regiment.

== Political and later career ==
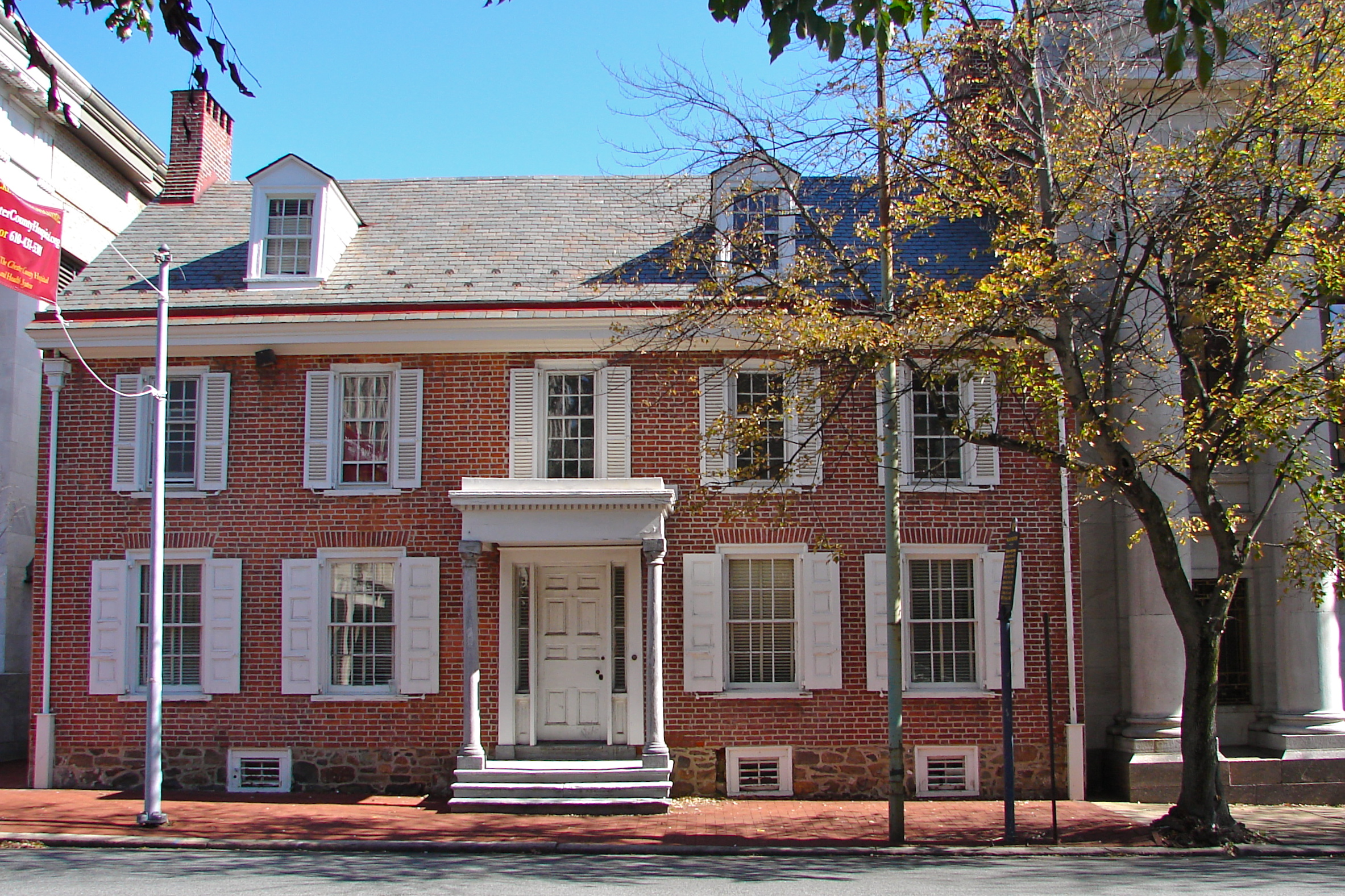
Darlington's office was in this building of the National Bank of Chester County.

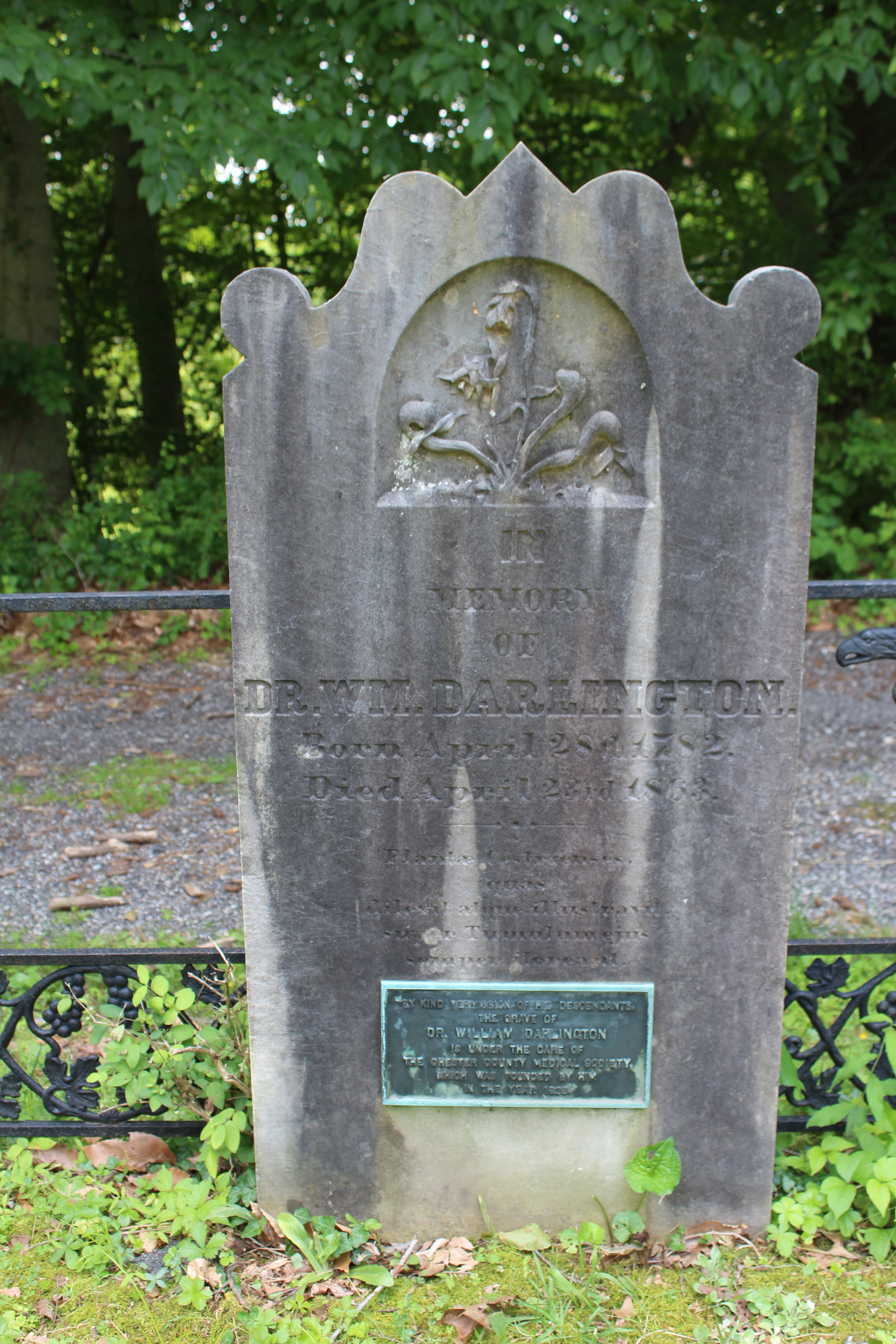
Darlington grave in Oaklands Cemetery

Darlington was elected as a Democratic-Republican to the Fourteenth Congress. He was again elected to the Sixteenth and Seventeenth Congresses. He was appointed canal commissioner in 1825, and served as the first president of the West Chester Railroad from 1831 to 1835. He practiced law in West Chester in partnership with Robert Cornwell from 1868 to 1878.

In 1823, Darlington was elected to the American Philosophical Society.

He established a natural history society in West Chester in 1826 and published several works on botany and natural history. His published works include Mutual Influence of Habits and Disease (1804), Flora cestrica: an attempt to enumerate and describe the flowering and filicoid plants of Chester County in the state of Pennsylvania (1837) and Agricultural Botany (1847). Several others also contributed to the Flora cestrica, making it a collaborative effort. These included Thomas Potts James who wrote the section about mosses and liverworts and Ezra Michner also contributed to this book. Abigail Kimber had provided plant specimens to Darlington and these are also cited in the book.

The degree of L.L.D. was conferred on him by Yale University in 1848, and he was awarded a Doctor of Physical Science in 1855 by Dickinson College. The California pitcher plant, Darlingtonia californica, was described by John Torrey in 1853 and named in his honor. The Academy of Natural Sciences of Drexel University preserves some botanical specimens that he collected — for example, of Talinum teretifolium (Phemeranthus teretifolius — the quill fameflower).

In 1849 he published Memorials of John Bartram and Humphry Marshall; with notices of their Botanical Contemporaries.

He served as director and president of the National Bank of Chester County from 1830 to 1863, where his friend and fellow botanist David Townsend was chief cashier. He died in West Chester in 1863, and was interred in Oaklands Cemetery.

== Sources ==
- daguerreotype
- Lansing, Dorothy I. That Magnificent Cestrian: Dr. William Darlington, 1782-1863, Being a Short Introductory Biography. Paoli, Pennsylvania: Serpentine Press, 1985.
- Author:William Darlington wikisource

U.S. House of Representatives
| Preceded by Samuel Henderson; Roger Davis | Member of the U.S. House of Representatives from Pennsylvania's 2nd congressional district 1815–1817 alongside: John Hahn | Succeeded by Isaac Darlington; Levi Pawling |
| Preceded by Isaac Darlington; Levi Pawling | Member of the U.S. House of Representatives from Pennsylvania's 2nd congressional district 1819–1823 alongside: Samuel Gross | Succeeded by Joseph Hemphill |
