= John Carmichael Jenkins =

American physician

- Born: December 13, 1809; Churchtown, Pennsylvania
- Died: October 14, 1855 (aged 45); Natchez, Mississippi
- Resting place: Elgin, Natchez, Mississippi
- Occupations: Planter; medical doctor; horticulturalist
- Spouse: Annis Dunbar Jenkins
- Children: 4
- Parent(s): Robert Jenkins; Catherine (Carmichael) Jenkins

John Carmichael Jenkins (1809–1855) was an American plantation owner, medical doctor and horticulturalist in the Antebellum South.

== Biography ==
=== Early life ===
Jenkins was born on December 13, 1809, at the Windsor Forge Mansion in Churchtown, Pennsylvania. His parents were Robert Jenkins (1769–1848), a Congressman from Pennsylvania, and Catherine Carmichael (1774–1853). He had one brother, David Jenkins (1800–1850), and six sisters, Elizabeth Jenkins (1803–1870), Mary Jenkins (1805–1859), Martha Jenkins (1805–1890), Phoebe Ann Jenkins (1807–1872), Catharine Jenkins (1812–1886), and Sarah Jenkins (1817-unknown).

He graduated from Dickinson College in Carlisle, Pennsylvania, and received a Doctorate in Medicine from the Medical School at the University of Pennsylvania in Philadelphia in 1833.

=== Career ===
He moved to the Wilkinson County, Mississippi, to take over the medical practise of his uncle, John Flavel Carmichael (unknown-1837), a medical doctor and plantation owner who had become blind.

He owned several plantations in the Natchez District, some of which he inherited, some of which he purchased and developed. For example, he owned the Cold Spring Plantation in Pinckneyville, Mississippi. Additionally, he owned several other plantations like the Stock Farm Plantation near Nesbit, Mississippi, in DeSoto County, Mississippi, the Tarbert Plantation in Wilkinson County, Mississippi, and another plantation in West Feliciana Parish, Louisiana.

A horticulturalist, he would use his Natchez residence, Elgin, as a plant nursery for different varieties of fruit trees and cotton he would later use on other plantations. He also produced hybrid species of orchids. Additionally, he was a wine connoisseur and collector of wine vintages. He was a member of the Academy of Natural Sciences, the Historical Society of Pennsylvania and the American Pomological Society. He kept a diary from 1841 to 1855.

He was a proponent of slavery, both as an economic necessity and a constitutional right.

=== Personal life ===
In 1839, he married Annis (Field Dunbar) Jenkins (1820–1855), the daughter of Dr. William Dunbar (1793–1847) and granddaughter of Sir William Dunbar (1750–1810), of the Forest Plantation near Natchez, Mississippi. They resided at Elgin in Natchez. They had four children:

- Alice Dunbar Jenkins (1841–1929).
- Mary Dunbar Jenkins (1843–1927).
- Captain John Flavel Jenkins (1846–1927). He served in the Confederate States Army and married Helen Louisa Winchester (1849–1917) of The Elms in Natchez.
- Major William Dunbar Jenkins (1849–1914).

=== Death ===
He died of yellow fever on October 14, 1855, in Natchez.
