= Patrik Andersson (disambiguation) =

Patrik Andersson may refer to:

- Patrik Andersson (born 1971), Swedish footballer
- Patrik Andersson (footballer, born 1967), Swedish footballer

== See also ==
- Patrick Anderson (disambiguation)
