= Joseph Lefever =

American politician (1760–1826)

Joseph Lafever

Member of the U.S. House of Representatives from Pennsylvania's 3rd district
- In office March 4, 1811 – March 3, 1813 Serving with Roger Davis, John M. Hyneman
- Preceded by: Daniel Hiester; Robert Jenkins; Matthias Richards
- Succeeded by: John Gloninger; James Whitehill

Personal details
- Born: April 3, 1760 Strasburg Township, Lancaster County, Province of Pennsylvania, British America
- Died: October 17, 1826 (aged 66) Paradise Township, Lancaster County, Pennsylvania, U.S.
- Resting place: Carpenter's Graveyard, Paradise, Pennsylvania, U.S.
- Party: Democratic-Republican
- Profession: Politician

Joseph Lefever (April 3, 1760 – October 17, 1826) was an American politician who served a single term in the United States House of Representatives, representing the 3rd congressional district of Pennsylvania from 1811 to 1813 as a member of the Democratic-Republican Party.

== Early life ==
Lefever was born on April 3, 1760 in Strasburg Township, Pennsylvania in the Province of Pennsylvania, located near Paradise, Pennsylvania.

== Career ==
Lefever served a single term in the United States House of Representatives, representing the 3rd congressional district of Pennsylvania from 1811 to 1813 as a member of the Democratic-Republican Party. He served in the 12th United States Congress; his tenure began on March 4, 1811 and concluded on March 3, 1813.

Lefever missed 140 of the 314 roll call votes between November 1811 and March 1813.

== Death ==
Lefever died at the age of 66 in Paradise Township, Pennsylvania on October 17, 1826. He was interred in Carpenter's Graveyard, located in Paradise.

== See also ==
- List of United States representatives who served a single term

U.S. House of Representatives
Preceded by Daniel Hiester; Robert Jenkins; Matthias Richards	Member of the U.S. House of Representatives from Pennsylvania's 3rd congressional district 1811–1813; Served alongside: Roger Davis, John M. Hyneman	Succeeded by John Gloninger; James Whitehill
