= John M. Hyneman =

American politician

Member of the U.S. House of Representatives from Pennsylvania
- In office March 4, 1811 – August 2, 1813
- Preceded by: Matthias Richards; Robert Jenkins; Daniel Hiester
- Succeeded by: Daniel Udree
- Constituency: 3rd district (1811–1813); 7th district (1813)

Member of the Pennsylvania House of Representatives
- In office 1809

Personal details
- Born: April 25, 1771 Reading, Province of Pennsylvania, British America
- Died: April 16, 1816 (aged 44) Reading, Pennsylvania, U.S.
- Party: Democratic-Republican

John M. Hyneman (April 25, 1771 – April 16, 1816) was a Pennsylvanian member of the U.S. House of Representatives from March 4, 1811

== Biography ==
John M. Hyneman was born in Reading in the Province of Pennsylvania. He was a member of the Pennsylvania House of Representatives in 1809. He was a clerk of the orphans’ court from 1810 to 1816.

Hyneman was elected as a Republican to the Twelfth and Thirteenth Congresses and served until his resignation on August 2, 1813. He was not a candidate for renomination in 1814. He was commissioned a brigadier general in the Pennsylvania Militia and served as surveyor of Berks County, Pennsylvania, in 1816. He died in Reading in 1816. Interment in the Trinity Lutheran Cemetery.

== Sources ==
- United States Congress. "John M. Hyneman (id: H001026)". Biographical Directory of the United States Congress.
- The Political Graveyard

U.S. House of Representatives
Preceded by Matthias Richards; Robert Jenkins; Daniel Hiester	Member of the U.S. House of Representatives from Pennsylvania's 3rd congressional district 1811–1813 alongside:Roger Davis and Joseph Lefever	Succeeded by John Gloninger; James Whitehill
Preceded by William Piper	Member of the U.S. House of Representatives from Pennsylvania's 7th congressional district 1813	Succeeded by Daniel Udree
