= William Piper =

American politician (1774–1852)

Member of the U.S. House of Representatives from Pennsylvania
- In office March 4, 1811 – March 4, 1817
- Preceded by: John Rea (7th); William Findley (8th)
- Succeeded by: John M. Hyneman (7th); Alexander Ogle (8th)
- Constituency: 7th district (1811-13); 8th district (1813-17)

Member of the Pennsylvania Senate for the 14th district
- In office 1817–1820
- Preceded by: John Tod
- Succeeded by: David Mann

Member of the Pennsylvania Senate for the 22nd district
- In office 1821–1832

Personal details
- Born: January 1, 1774 Bloody Run, Province of Pennsylvania, British America
- Died: 1852 (aged 78) Hopewell Township, Pennsylvania, U.S.
- Party: Democratic-Republican

William Piper (January 1, 1774 – 1852) was an American politician from Pennsylvania who served as a Democratic-Republican member of the U.S. House of Representatives for Pennsylvania's 7th congressional district from 1811 to 1813 and for Pennsylvania's 8th congressional district from 1813 to 1817.

He was born at Bloody Run (now Everett) in the Province of Pennsylvania to John and Elizabeth Lusk Piper. He commanded a regiment during the War of 1812, and served as adjutant general of Pennsylvania after the war. He served in the Pennsylvania State Senate for the 14th district from 1817 to 1820 and for the 22nd district from 1821 to 1832. Piper was elected as a Democratic-Republican to the Twelfth, Thirteenth, and Fourteenth Congresses. He died in Hopewell Township, Pennsylvania in 1852. Interment in the Piper Cemetery on his farm in Hopewell Township.

== Sources ==
- United States Congress. "William Piper (id: P000363)". Biographical Directory of the United States Congress.
- The Political Graveyard

U.S. House of Representatives
Preceded by John Rea	Member of the U.S. House of Representatives from Pennsylvania's 7th congressional district 1811–1813	Succeeded by John M. Hyneman
Preceded by William Findley	Member of the U.S. House of Representatives from Pennsylvania's 8th congressional district 1813–1817	Succeeded by Alexander Ogle
Pennsylvania State Senate
Preceded by John Tod	Member of the Pennsylvania Senate, 14th district 1817-1820	Succeeded by David Mann
Preceded by	Member of the Pennsylvania Senate, 22nd district 1821-1832	Succeeded by
