= John Whitehill (politician) =

American politician (1729–1815)

John Whitehill (December 11, 1729 – September 16, 1815) was a member of the U.S. House of Representatives from Pennsylvania.

John Whitehill (father of James Whitehill and brother of Robert Whitehill) was born in Salisbury Township, Lancaster County, Pennsylvania. He studied law, was admitted to the bar and commenced practice in Lancaster County. He was appointed justice of the peace and justice of the orphans’ court of Lancaster County in 1777. He was a member of the Pennsylvania House of Representatives in 1780–1782 and 1793. He served as a member of the council of censors in 1783, and was a delegate to the supreme executive council in 1784. He was a member of the State ratification convention in 1787. He served as associate judge of Lancaster County in 1791.

Whitehill was elected as a Republican to the Eighth and Ninth Congresses. He died in Salisbury Township, and is interred in Pequea Presbyterian Church Cemetery.

== See also ==
- Whitehill–Wise family

Political offices
Preceded by Samuel John Atlee	Member, Supreme Executive Council of Pennsylvania, representing Lancaster County; 22 December 1784 – 16 October 1787	Succeeded by George Ross
U.S. House of Representatives
Preceded by Joseph Hemphill	Member of the U.S. House of Representatives from Pennsylvania's 3rd congressional district 1803–1807; 1803–1807 alongside: Isaac Anderson 1803–1805 alongside: Joseph Hiester; 1805–1806 alongside: Christian Lower	Succeeded by Robert Jenkins; Matthias Richards; John Hiester
