= James Kelton Jr. =

American politician (died 1844)

Member of the Pennsylvania Senate from the 4th district
- In office 1822–1826

Member of the Pennsylvania Senate from the 2nd district
- In office 1821–1822

Member of the Pennsylvania House of Representatives from the Chester County district
- In office 1819–1820
- In office 1804–1809

Personal details
- Born: 1769 or 1776 London Grove Township, Province of Pennsylvania
- Died: November 25, 1844 London Presbyterian Church Cemetery; New London Township, Pennsylvania, U.S.
- Party: Federalist (1801–1805,1808–1826); Quid (1805–1807); Constitutionalist (1807–1808)
- Spouse(s): Agnes Mackey (m. 1793–1823) Sophia Slaymaker
- Children: 11
- Occupation: Politician

James Kelton Jr. (1769 or 1776 – November 25, 1844) was an American politician from Pennsylvania. He served as a member of the Pennsylvania House of Representatives from 1804 to 1809 and from 1819 to 1820. He also served as a member of the Pennsylvania Senate from 1821 to 1826.

== Early life ==
James Kelton Jr. was born in 1769 or 1776 in London Grove Township, Pennsylvania, to Mary (née Hackett) and James Kelton.

== Career ==
Kelton was a Federalist. He served as sheriff of Chester County from 1801 to 1803. He was the first postmaster of West Grove. He was a successful Federalist candidate for the Pennsylvania House of Representatives, representing Chester County, in 1804. He was elected as a Quid to the Pennsylvania House and served from 1805 to 1807. He served as a Constitutionalist in the Pennsylvania House from 1807 to 1808. He served in the Pennsylvania House from 1808 to 1809 as a Federalist.

Kelton was an unsuccessful candidate for Chester County sheriff in 1810 and an unsuccessful candidate for Chester County auditor in 1812 and 1814. In 1818, he was an unsuccessful Federalist candidate for the 2nd district of the U.S. House of Representatives. He was elected again to the Pennsylvania House of Representatives and served as a Federalist from 1819 to 1820. He ran for speaker of the house in 1820, but lost. He was elected to the 2nd district of the Pennsylvania Senate, representing Chester and Delaware counties. He served from 1821 to 1822. He served in the 4th district of the Pennsylvania Senate, representing Chester and Delaware counties, from 1822 to 1826.

Kelton held stock in the first stage route in the U.S., from Philadelphia to Baltimore.

== Personal life ==
Kelton married Agnes Mackey, daughter of David Mackey, on February 7, 1793. They had eleven children, David M. (born 1794), John M. (born 1795), James (born 1796), Mary Jackson (born 1798), Robert (born 1800), Joseph (born 1802), Agnes (born 1805), George M. (born 1810), Margarette (born 1812), Julia and Rachel (born 1814). His wife died in 1823. He married Sophia Slaymaker. His son John served as justice of the peace and was a founder of Lincoln University. His grandson Robert C. Kelton was founder of Kelton. Kelton was a Presbyterian.

Kelton died on November 25, 1844. He was interred at London Presbyterian Church Cemetery in New London Township.
