= Isaac Anderson (Pennsylvania politician) =

American politician (1760–1838)

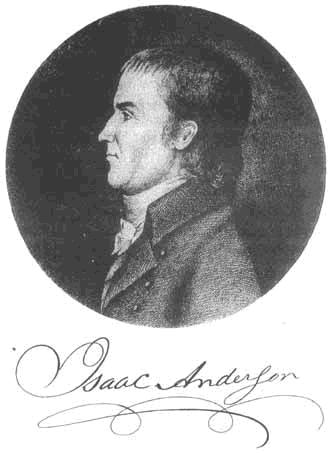

Member of the U.S. House of Representatives from Pennsylvania's 3rd district
- In office March 4, 1803 – March 3, 1807
- Preceded by: Joseph Hemphill
- Succeeded by: Robert Jenkins, Matthias Richards, John Hiester

Member of the Pennsylvania House of Representatives from the Chester County district
- In office 1801–1801 Serving with Thomas Bull, John McDowell, Isaac Wayne, William Gibbons
- Preceded by: Abiah Taylor
- Succeeded by: Joseph Park, James Fulton, Edward Darlington, Thomas Taylor, Methuselah Davis

Personal details
- Born: November 23, 1760 Charleston Township, Province of Pennsylvania, British America
- Died: October 27, 1838 (aged 77) Charleston Township, Pennsylvania, U.S.
- Resting place: near Schuylkill Township, Pennsylvania, U.S.
- Party: Democratic-Republican
- Spouse: Mary Lane
- Children: 11
- Parent: Patrick Anderson (father)
- Relatives: Matthias J. Pennypacker (grandson); Samuel W. Pennypacker (great-grandson)

Isaac Anderson (November 23, 1760 – October 27, 1838) was a member of the U.S. House of Representatives from Pennsylvania from 1803 to 1807. He also served as a member of the Pennsylvania House of Representatives, representing Chester County in 1801.

== Early life ==
Isaac Anderson was born on November 23, 1760, at "Anderson Place" in Charleston Township in the Province of Pennsylvania (in the portion that is now Schuylkill Township), near Valley Forge, the son of Elizabeth (née Morris) and Patrick Anderson and grandson of early settler James Anderson. His father was a member of the Pennsylvania House of Representatives. As a youth, he was known for his strength and wrestled.

== Military career ==
At the age of 15, he served as carrier of dispatches between the headquarters of the Revolutionary Army under General George Washington at Valley Forge and the Congress, then in session at York, Pennsylvania. In 1777, he was present at the Battle of Warren Tavern near Paoli, Pennsylvania. He served three terms of service in the American Revolutionary War before reaching the age of 18, at which time he became an ensign in the Fifth Battalion of Chester County Militia. He was commissioned on May 24, 1779, as first lieutenant, Fifth Battalion, Sixth Company.

== Political career ==
Anderson served as justice of the peace in Charlestown Township for several years. He served as a member of the Pennsylvania House of Representatives, representing Chester County in 1801. He succeeded Abiah Taylor.

Anderson was elected as a Republican to the Eighth and Ninth Congresses. He was not a candidate for renomination in 1806. He was a presidential elector during the 1816 United States presidential election.

Anderson was engaged in agricultural pursuits and sawmilling. He was reported to have built the first lime kiln in Chester County. He wrote a history about his neighborhood in Chester County.

== Personal life ==
Anderson married Mary Lane, daughter of Edward Lane and great-granddaughter of Samuel Richardson. They had eleven children, including Isaac and Sarah. He was a Methodist. His grandson Matthias J. Pennypacker served in the Pennsylvania House of Representatives. He is the great-grandfather of Pennsylvania Governor Samuel W. Pennypacker.

Anderson died at "Anderson Place" in 1838. Interment was in the family burying ground across the road from the family home near Valley Forge in Schuylkill Township.

U.S. House of Representatives
Preceded by Seat created	Member of the U.S. House of Representatives from Pennsylvania's 3rd congressional district 1803-1807	Succeeded by Matthias Richards
