= Charlestown Village Historic District =

Historic district in Pennsylvania, United States

- U.S. National Register of Historic Places
- U.S. Historic district
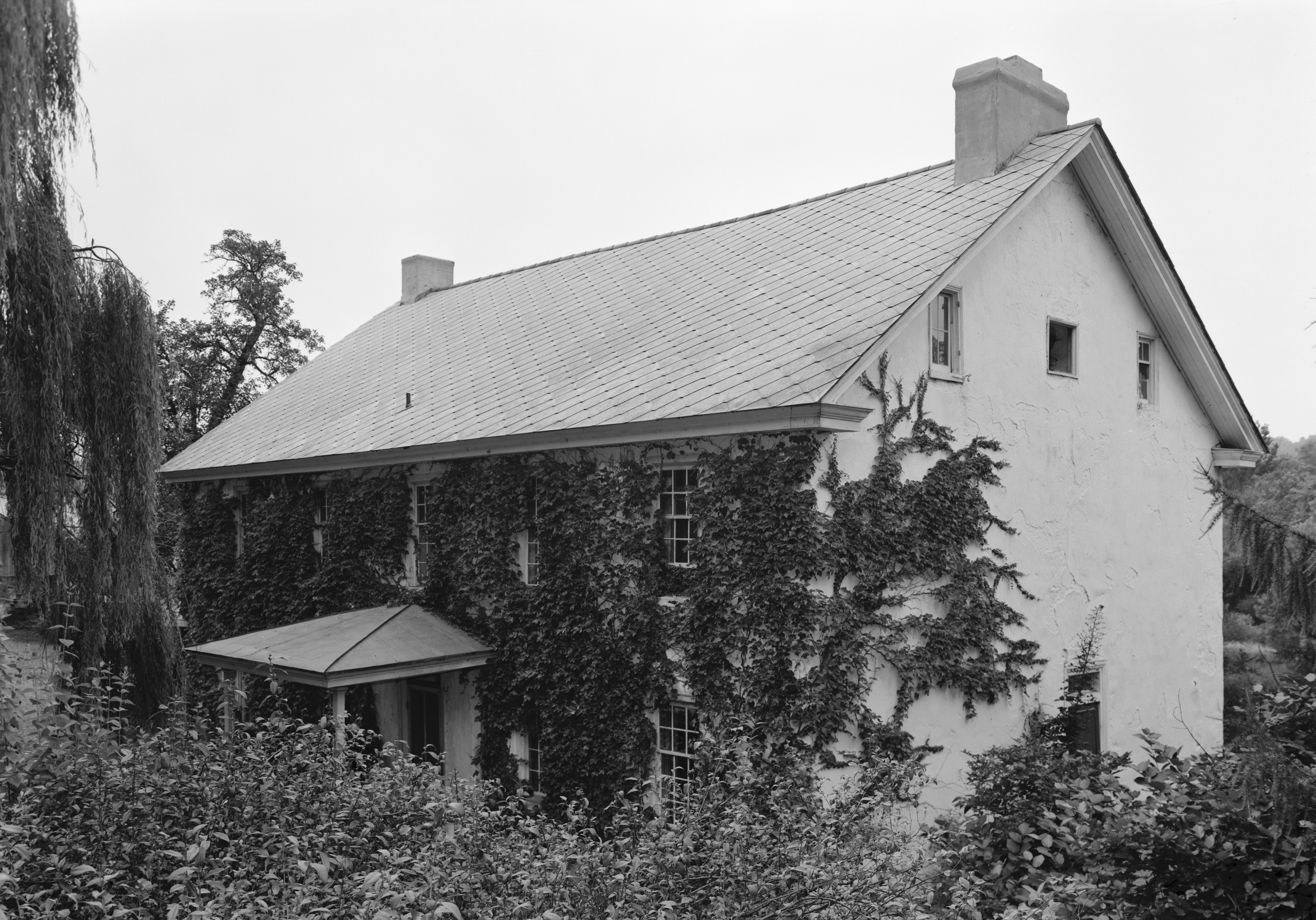
- Job Harvey House, Charlestown Village Historic District, HABS Photo, August 1958

- Location within Pennsylvania Location within the United States
- Location: Southwest of Phoenixville on Charlestown Road, Charlestown Township, Pennsylvania
- Coordinates: 40°05′58″N 75°33′24″W
- Area: 126.1 acres (51.0 ha)
- Built: 1745
- Architectural style: Late Victorian, Italianate
- NRHP reference No.: 78002374
- Added to NRHP: May 16, 1978

Charlestown Village Historic District is a national historic district located in Charlestown Township, Chester County, Pennsylvania. It is adjacent to the Middle Pickering Rural Historic District. It encompasses 21 contributing buildings and 1 contributing structure on 7 properties in the crossroads village of Charlestown. They date between about 1740 and 1870, and are reflective of a number of popular architectural styles including Late Victorian and Italianate. The oldest is the Job Harvey House, built about 1740. Also included is the Charlestown Woolen Mill (1862-1865), William Nixon House (c. 1817), Charlestown Methodist Episcopal Church (1840, 1881), Moses King House, William Howard house and wheelwright shop, and the "Town Hall."

It was listed on the National Register of Historic Places in 1978.

== Charlestown Woolen Mill ==
The mill was built after Job Harvey, a miller, purchased 340 acres of land in 1724. Charlestown grew up around the mill, which was fed from Pickering Creek via a small dam and retention pond. It was active for most of the years between 1724-1899, producing or processing textiles including flax, wool and cotton. The mill was added to the National Register of Historic Places in 1978.

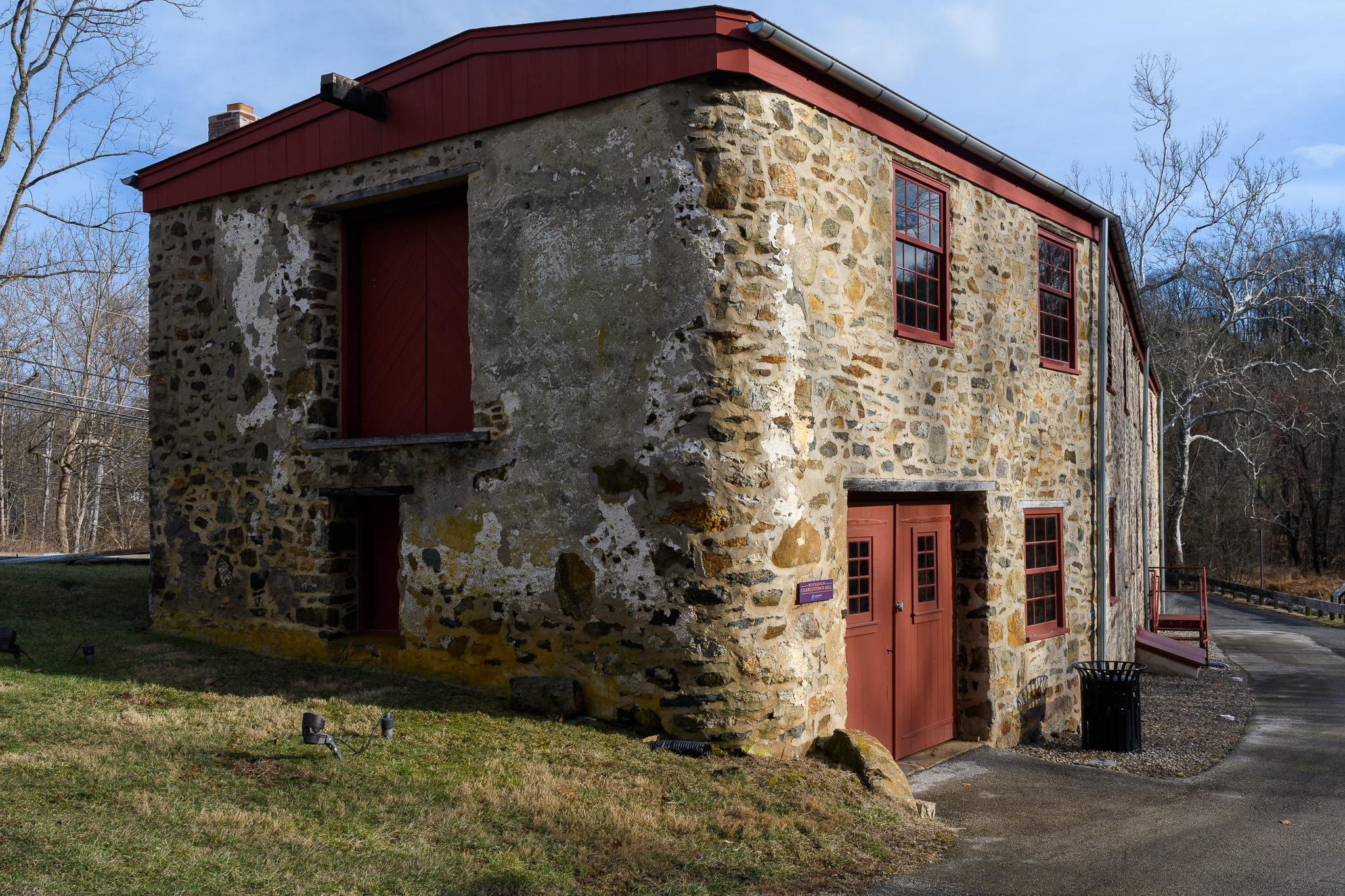
North Western elevation of mill building

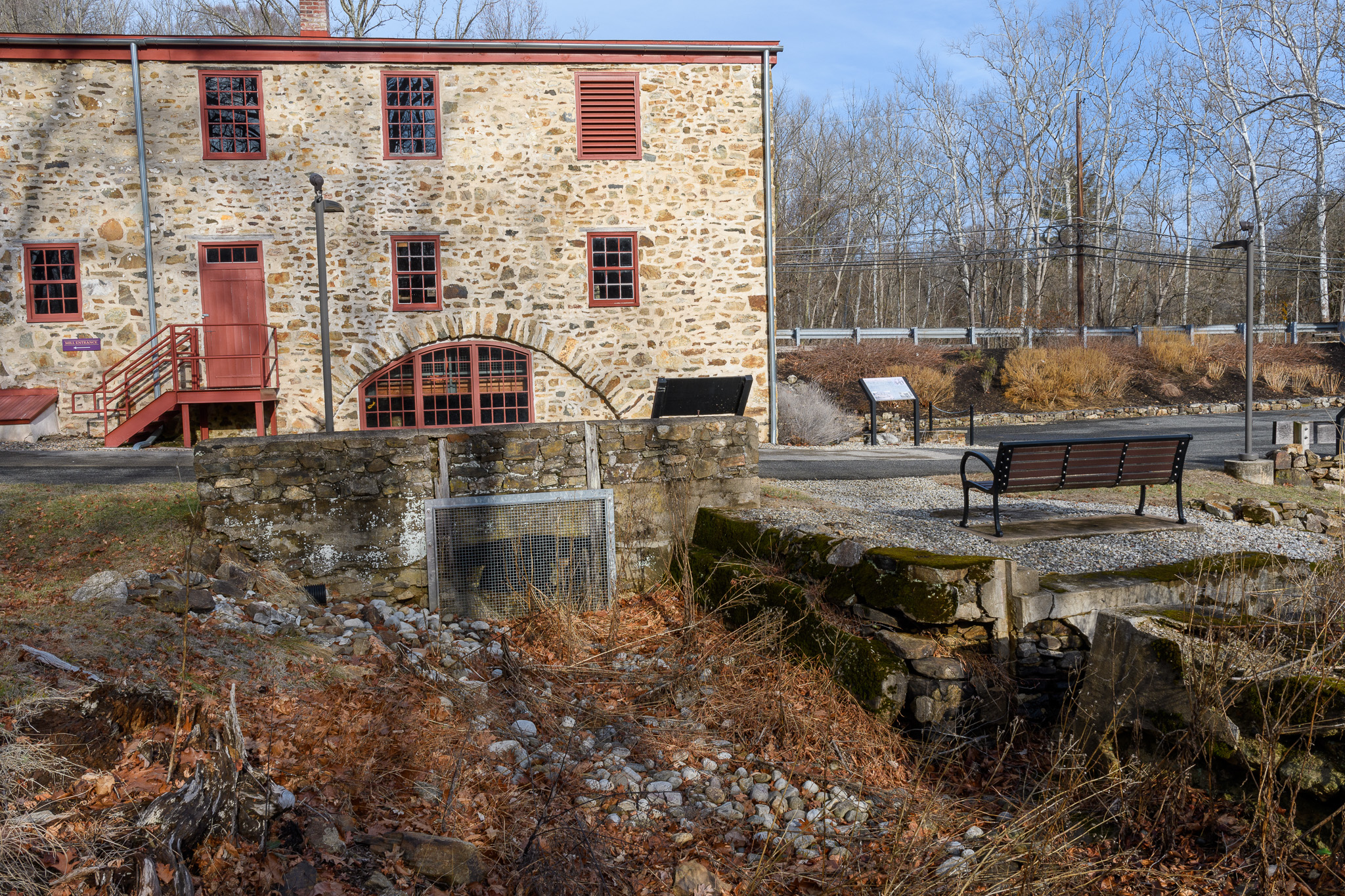
South Western elevation of mill building, showing Tail Race in foreground

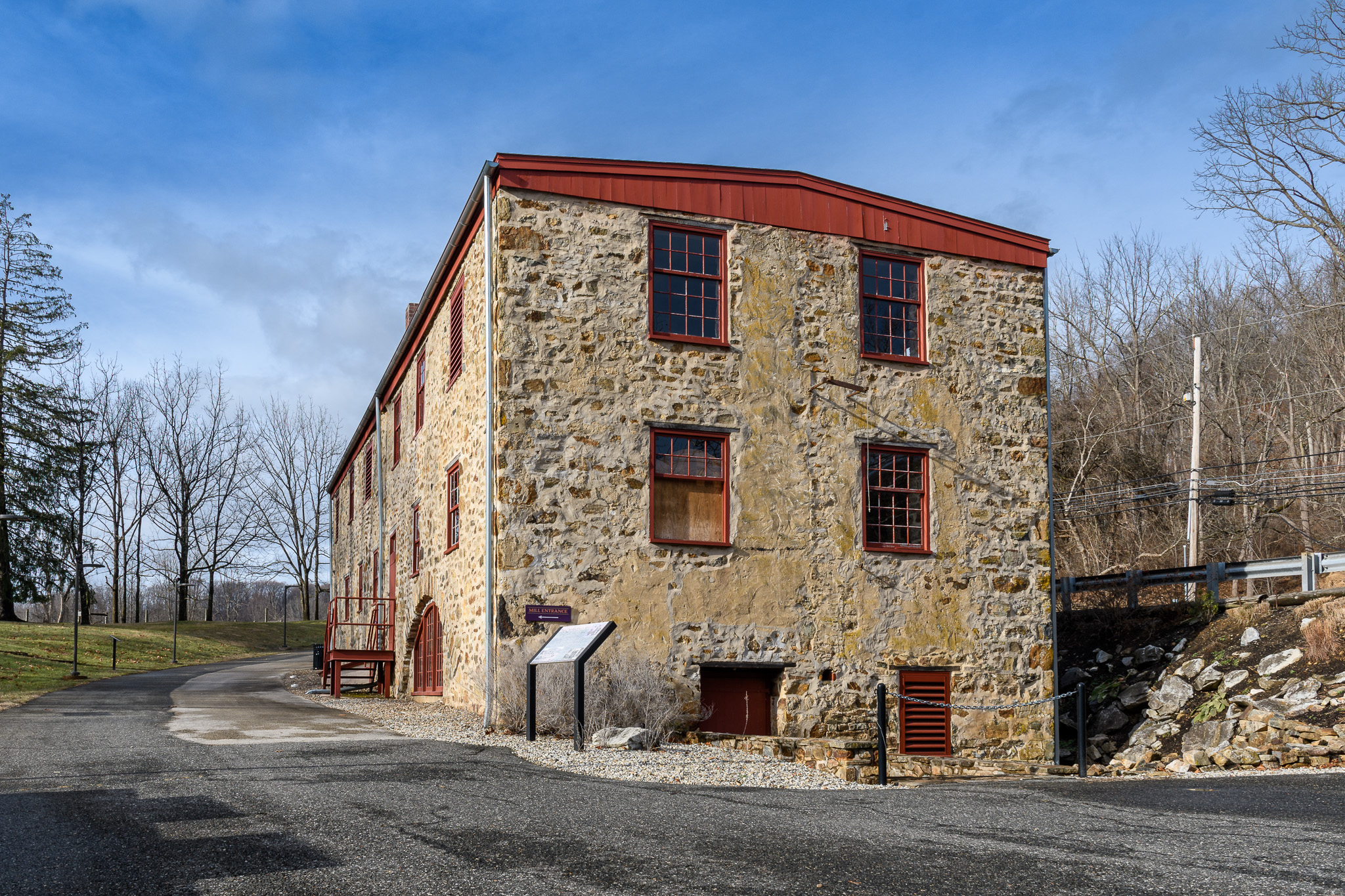
South Eastern elevation of mill building

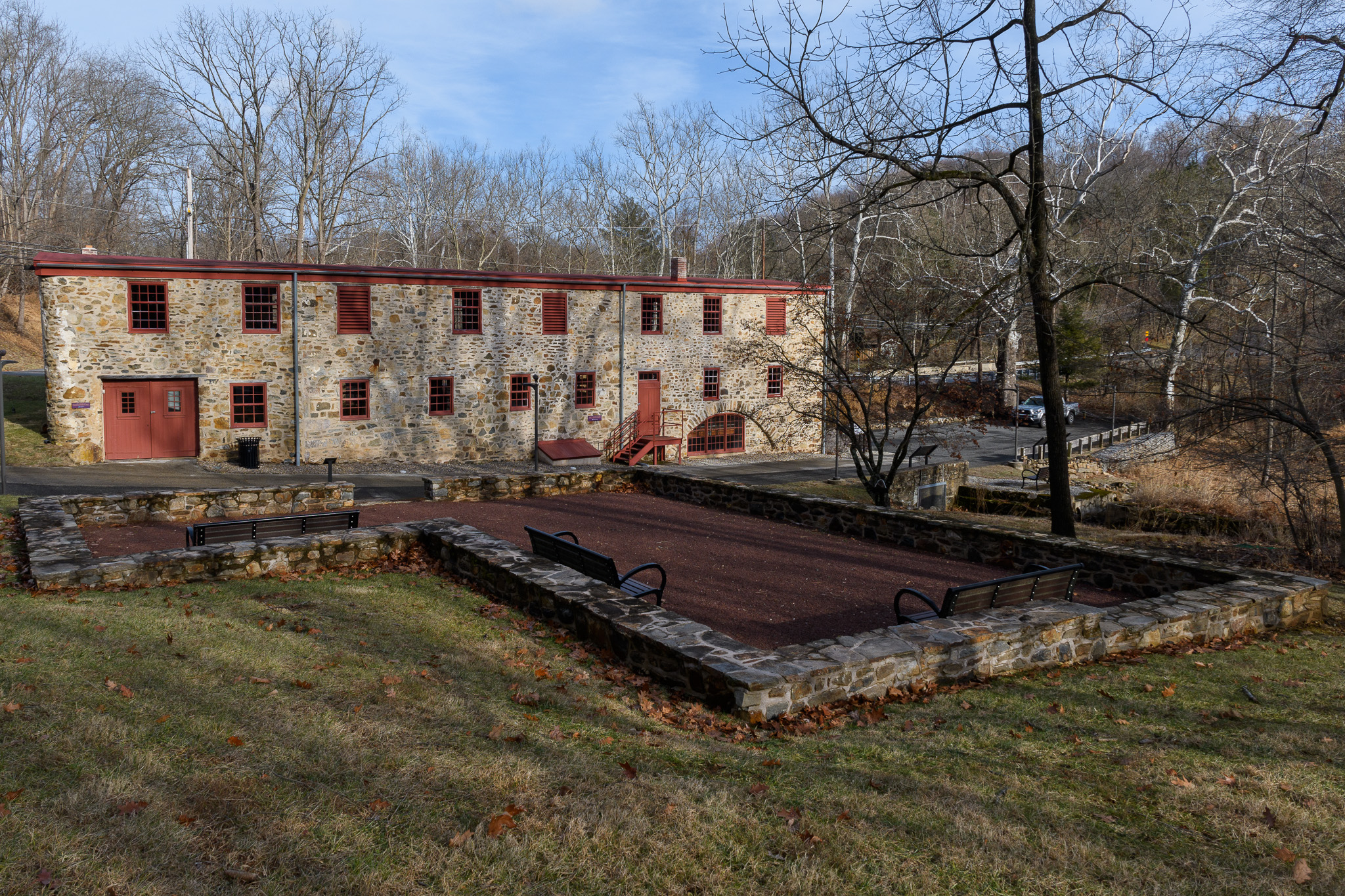
Southern Elevation of Mill Building including the foundation footprint of the Baughman Home (c. 1700s, burned down in 1987)

== Charlestown Methodist Episcopal Church ==
Built in 1840 and expanded in 1881.

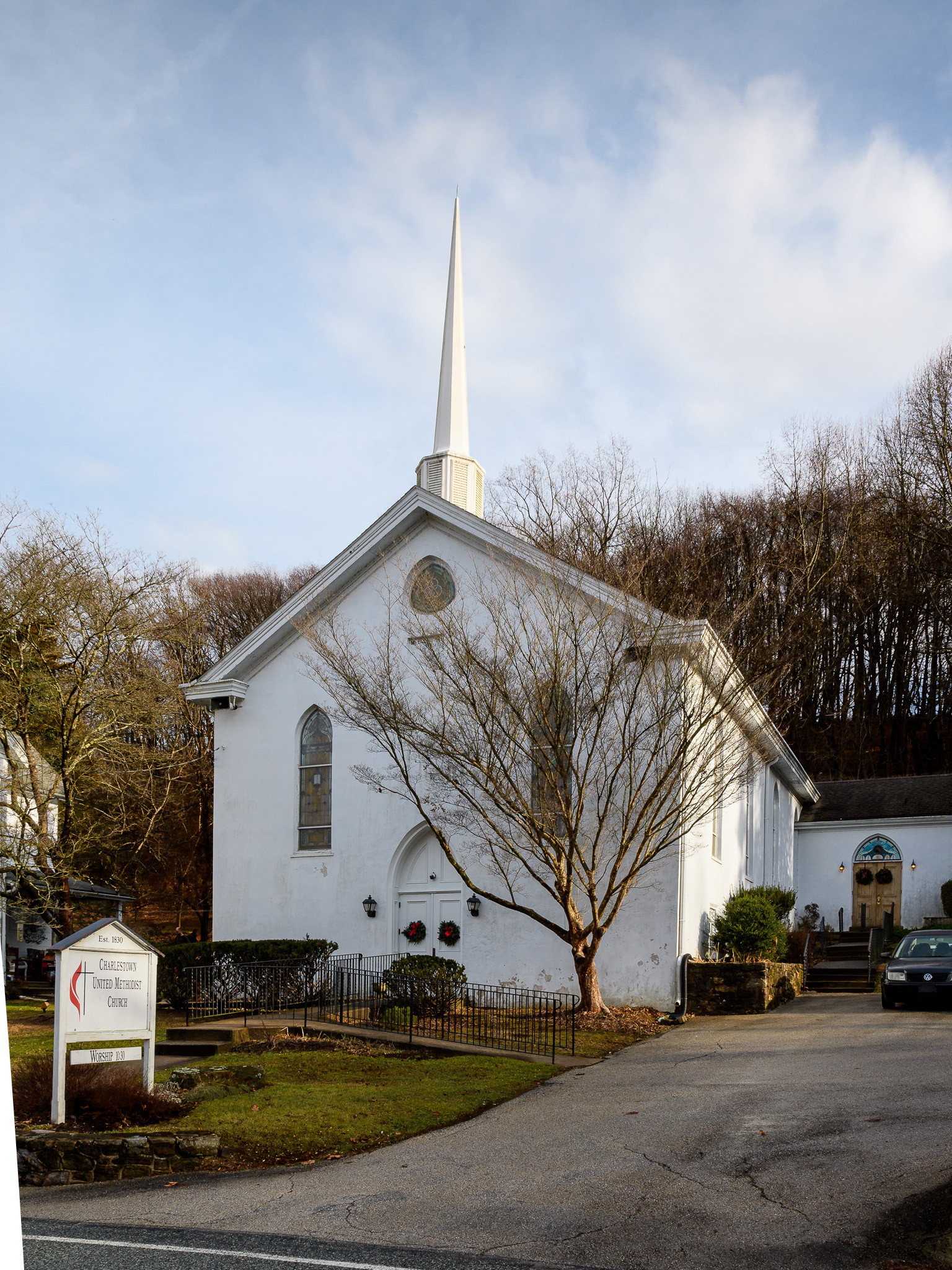
Built in 1840 and expanded in 1881.
