= Patrick Anderson (assemblyman) =

American politician (1719–1793)

Member of the Pennsylvania House of Representatives from the Chester County district
- In office 1778–1781

Personal details
- Born: 1719 Charlestown Township, Province of Pennsylvania
- Died: 1793 (aged 73–74)
- Spouse: Hannah Martin (m. 1748)
- Children: Isaac
- Relatives: Matthew Quay (great-grandson); Samuel W. Pennypacker (great-grandson)
- Occupation: Politician; military officer

Patrick Anderson (1719 – 1793) was an American Patriot who was an officer in the French and Indian War and the American Revolution and later was a member of the Pennsylvania General Assembly.

== Early life ==
Patrick Anderson was the son of James Anderson, an early Scot (c. 1707) immigrant to Pennsylvania and Elizabeth Jerman (Jarman), the daughter of Thomas Jerman, a Welsh Quaker, who purchased one of William Penn’s first grist milling licenses.

Anderson was born at “Anderson Place,” in then Charlestown Township, Pennsylvania (now Schuylkill Township, Chester County, Pennsylvania), near Valley Forge, Pennsylvania. He was the first person of European descent born in Charlestown Township.

He was educated in Philadelphia and returned home to farm. He built, opened and taught at the first school house in the Valley Forge area. He was married 3 times, the first time to Hannah Martin in historic Christ Church in Philadelphia on December 22, 1748.

== American Revolutionary War ==
Anderson was captain of a company of Chester County men who served in the French and Indian War.

At the time of the Revolution, Anderson was serving on Anthony Wayne's first Chester County Committee of Safety. The Assembly sent a Captain's Commission to him, and, although an older man, being 55 at the time, he accepted it, called together his old soldiers, and the entire company of fifty-six men enlisted. His company was known as the Chester County Minute Men of 1775. Anderson paid for and outfitted his entire company but was never compensated by the Continental Congress, and lost half of his farm, which he had mortgaged to a neighbor.

In March 1776, he was appointed senior captain of the Pennsylvania Battalion of Musketry (sometimes called Samuel Atlee's Battalion) and fought for one tour of the Revolution, until the impairment of his health compelled his retirement. He was a member of the Society of the Cincinnati.

He fought bravely at the Battle of Long Island, Battle of Fort Washington, the Battle of Brandywine and Battle of Germantown. A letter from Anderson to Benjamin Franklin describing the disarray of the Pennsylvania troops after the Battle of Long Island is preserved in the Pennsylvania State Archives. (Note: The letter is located at Pennsylvania Archives, 1st Series, Volume V, p. 26.)

Anderson served in the Pennsylvania Assembly from 1778 to 1781. In 1781 he was appointed one of the commissioners for the Committee of Navigation of the Schuylkill River.

== Later life ==
Anderson died in 1793. His service to his country has been commemorated through a pew dedicated in his honor at the Washington Memorial Chapel at Valley Forge National Park, the engraved inscription reads:

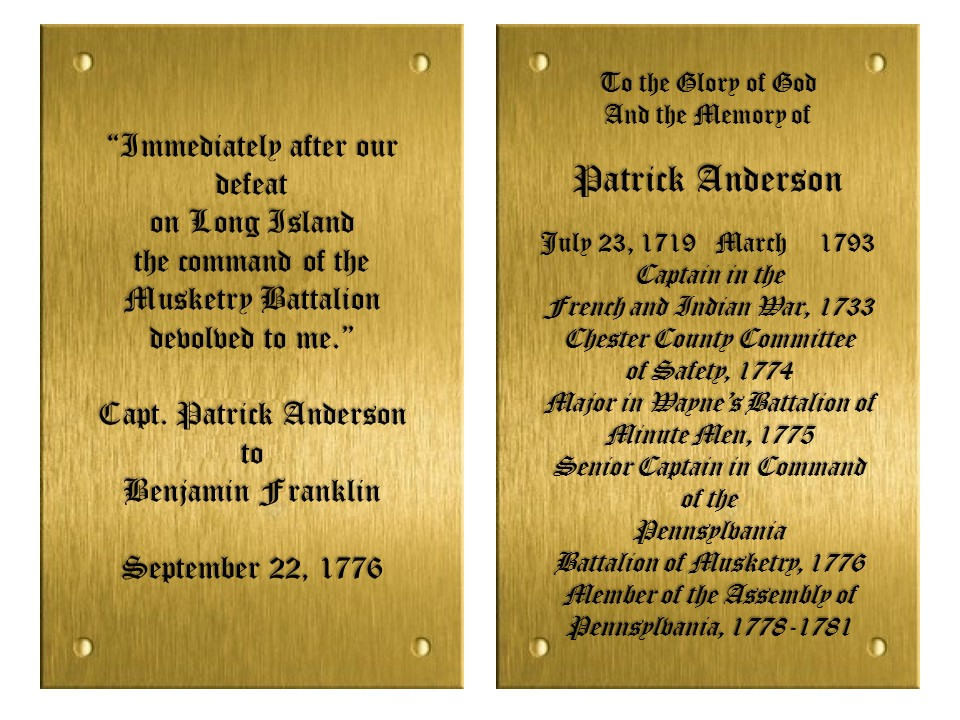
Patrick Anderson plaques at Valley Forge Chapel

Anderson is believed to be buried in the churchyard at St. Peter's of the Great Valley where he was a Vestryman however, his actual grave site has been lost to changes made to the church over the years. A large bronze plaque commemorates his memory inside the old church, almost directly over his presumed burial site.

His son Isaac also served in the Revolution and later as a U.S. Congressman representing the area. His great-grandson was U.S. Senator Matthew Quay. His daughter Ascenath married Joseph Quay and his granddaughter Sarah Anderson married Matthias Pennypacker and their son Samuel W. Pennypacker became Pennsylvania governor.

== Citations ==
- Smith, G, History of Delaware County, Pennsylvania, Ashmead, 1862
- Futhey, J. Smith & Cope, Gilbert, History of Chester County, Pennsylvania, Louis H. Everts, 1881
- Heathcote, Charles William, History of Chester County Pennsylvania, Horace Temple, 1928
- Pennypacker Gov. Samuel W., Annals of Phoenixville and its Vicinity, Bavis & Pennypacker, 1872
- Pennypacker Gov. Samuel W., Pennsylvania in American History, William J. Campbell, 1910
- Sutton, Isaac C., Notes of Family History: The Anderson, Schofield, Pennypacker, and Other Allied Families, Stephenson Bros., 1948
