= John Hahn (politician) =

American politician (1776–1823)

Member of the U.S. House of Representatives from Pennsylvania's 2nd district
- In office March 4, 1815 – March 3, 1817
- Preceded by: See below
- Succeeded by: See below

Personal details
- Born: October 30, 1776 New Hanover Township, Pennsylvania
- Died: February 26, 1823 (aged 46) New Hanover Township, Pennsylvania
- Party: Democratic-Republican
- Education: University of Pennsylvania

John Hahn (October 30, 1776 – February 26, 1823) was an American politician from Pennsylvania who served as a member of the U.S. House of Representatives for Pennsylvania's 2nd congressional district from 1815 to 1817.

== Biography ==
John Hahn was born in New Hanover Township, Pennsylvania. He studied at the University of Pennsylvania School of Medicine, graduating in 1798, and practiced medicine. Hahn was elected as a Republican to the Fourteenth Congress. He resumed the practice of medicine and also engaged in agricultural pursuits. He died in New Hanover Township in 1823, and was interred in Falkner Swamp Graveyard.

== Sources ==
- United States Congress. "John Hahn (id: H000018)". Biographical Directory of the United States Congress.
- The Political Graveyard

U.S. House of Representatives
Preceded by Samuel Henderson; Roger Davis	Member of the U.S. House of Representatives from Pennsylvania's 2nd congressional district 1815–1817 alongside: William Darlington	Succeeded by Isaac Darlington; Levi Pawling
