= John Hiester =

American military and political leader

Member of the U.S. House of Representatives from Pennsylvania's 3rd district
- In office March 4, 1807 – March 3, 1809
- Preceded by: See below
- Succeeded by: See below

Personal details
- Born: April 9, 1745 Goshenhoppen, Province of Pennsylvania, British America
- Died: October 15, 1821 (aged 76) Goshenhoppen, Pennsylvania, U.S.
- Party: Democratic-Republican
- Spouse: Hannah Pawling
- Children: Seven

John Hiester (April 9, 1745 – October 15, 1821) was an American military and political leader from the Revolutionary War era to the early 19th century. He was a member of the Hiester Family political dynasty.

The brother of US Congressman Daniel Hiester (1747-1804), the father of US Congressman Daniel Hiester (1774-1834), and the uncle of US Congressman and Pennsylvania State Senator William Hiester (1790-1853), John Hiester was a Republican who was elected to the 10th United States Congress (March 4, 1807 to March 3, 1809) during the administration of President Thomas Jefferson.

== Biography ==
Born in Goshenhoppen in the Province of Pennsylvania on April 9, 1745, John Hiester was a son of Daniel Hiester (1712-1795), a native of Germany, and Pennsylvania native Catharine (Schuler) Hiester (1716-1789). His parents were members of the Reformed Church of Goshenhoppen.

Residing at the family's home in Upper Salford Township, which was located near what is now Sumneytown, John Hiester grew up in a world of privilege with his siblings. According to Hiester family historian Henry Melchior Muhlenberg Richards, the Hiesters' home was "a fine, two-story brick mansion on the east side of the turnpike, close to Ridge Valley Creek" that was "sufficiently prominent to be noted on the map of Pennsylvania published by Nicholas Scull, the Province Surveyor, in 1759." In 1907, Richards described the home as follows:

A broad hall runs through the middle of the first story, on each side of which are spacious parlors; the second story is divided into bedrooms; above this is the roomy garrett of the olden time. Heavy eaves run along the gable roof, and a corresponding cornice forms the lower part of the gable. It was originally provided with a secret closet in which to hide plate in troublous times.

After completing his education in the public schools of the area, John Hiester entered the lumber business with his father in Berks County, Pennsylvania. He married Hannah Pawling (1747-1822) and fathered seven children.

=== Military and political career ===
During the Revolutionary War, Hiester volunteered for service with the Pennsylvania Militia. After serving as a captain with the 1st Company, 4th Battalion under Colonel William Evans in 1777, he served as a captain with the 1st Battalion of the Chester County Militia that same year. After the war, he was commissioned as Major General of Militia.

Elected to the Pennsylvania State Senate during the early 1800s, he represented Chester County constituents from 1802 to 1806.

He was then elected in 1806 to the United States House of Representatives, and served in the Tenth Congress from March 4, 1807, to March 3, 1809 during the administration of President Thomas Jefferson. Hiester entered the House during the era of the Napoleonic Wars, and was involved with attempts by the president and Congress to persuade the belligerents to end their conflicts, including passage of the Embargo Act of 1807 and the Non-Intercourse Act (1809).

In 1816, Hiester joined with John Cochran, J.P. Helfenstein, John Ramsey, and W. J. Duane in advocating for the creation of "an Independent Electoral Ticket" in Pennsylvania. Their appeal to Pennsylvania voters was published in the October 26, 1816 edition of the Lancaster Intelligencer.

== Death and interment ==
Hiester died in Goshenhoppen, Pennsylvania on October 15, 1821, and was buried at the Union Cemetery in Parker Ford, Pennsylvania.

== See also ==
- River Bend Farm

U.S. House of Representatives
Preceded by Isaac Anderson and John Whitehill	Member of the U.S. House of Representatives from Pennsylvania's 3rd congressional district 1807–1809 alongside: Robert Jenkins and Matthias Richards	Succeeded by Robert Jenkins; Matthias Richards and Daniel Hiester
