= Daniel Hiester (1774–1834) =

American politician

Member of the U.S. House of Representatives from Pennsylvania's 3rd district
- In office March 4, 1809 – March 3, 1811
- Preceded by: See below
- Succeeded by: See below

Personal details
- Born: 1774 Chester County, Province of Pennsylvania, British America
- Died: March 8, 1834 (aged 59–60) Hagerstown, Maryland, U.S.
- Party: Democratic-Republican

Daniel Hiester (1774 – March 8, 1834) was an American political leader from Pennsylvania. Hiester was a member of the Hiester family political dynasty. He was the son of John Hiester and nephew of U.S. Rep. Daniel Hiester (1747—1804) and Gabriel Hiester.

== Biography ==
Daniel Hiester was born in Chester County in the Province of Pennsylvania in 1774. He married Catherine Titlow.

Hiester was elected prothonotary and clerk of the courts of Chester County in 1800 and continued to serve until 1809.

Hiester was elected to the Eleventh Congress in 1808. He served in the United States House of Representatives from March 4, 1809, to March 3, 1811.

After his congressional career, Hiester helped establish the Bank of Chester County, was burgess of West Chester, Pennsylvania from 1815 to 1817, and was appointed register of wills and recorder of deeds on February 28, 1821.

He died in Hagerstown, Maryland on March 8, 1834. He was buried in the Congressional Cemetery in Washington, D.C.

== Sources ==
- United States Congress. "Daniel Hiester (id: H000571)". Biographical Directory of the United States Congress.
- The Political Graveyard

U.S. House of Representatives
Preceded by Robert Jenkins; Matthias Richards; John Hiester	Member of the U.S. House of Representatives from Pennsylvania's 3rd congressional district 1809–1811 alongside: Robert Jenkins and Matthias Richards	Succeeded by Roger Davis; John M. Hyneman and Joseph Lefever
