= Robert Jenkins (Pennsylvania politician) =

American politician

Member of the U.S. House of Representatives from Pennsylvania's 3rd district
- In office March 4, 1807 – March 3, 1811
- Preceded by: Isaac Anderson; John Whitehill
- Succeeded by: Roger Davis; John M. Hyneman; Joseph Lefever

Member of the Pennsylvania House of Representatives
- In office 1804 - 1805

Personal details
- Born: July 10, 1769 Caernarvon Township, Province of Pennsylvania, British America
- Died: April 18, 1848 (aged 78) Caernarvon Township, Pennsylvania, U.S.
- Party: Federalist
- Spouse: Catherine Carmichael

Robert Jenkins (July 10, 1769 – April 18, 1848) was a member of the United States House of Representatives from Pennsylvania.

== Biography ==
=== Early life ===
Robert Jenkins was born at Windsor Forge Mansion in Caernarvon Township in the Province of Pennsylvania. He attended the common schools and the select school of Dr. Robert Smith of Pequea. He was an ironmaster in Caernarvon Township, and a member of the Pennsylvania House of Representatives in 1804 and 1805.

=== Career ===
He was elected as a Federalist to the Tenth and Eleventh Congresses. He was a member of a Group of Horse, and took an active part in suppressing the Whisky Insurrection in Pennsylvania.

=== Personal life ===
He married Catherine Carmichael (1775–1853). They had two sons and six daughters: David Jenkins (1800–1850) and John Carmichael Jenkins (1809–1855), Elizabeth Jenkins (1803–1870), Mary Jenkins (1805–1859), Martha Jenkins (1805–1890), Phoebe Ann Jenkins (1807–1872), Catharine Jenkins (1812–1886), and Sarah Jenkins (1817-unknown).

=== Death ===
He died at Windsor Forge in 1848. He was buried in the Caernarvon Presbyterian Churchyard in Churchtown, Pennsylvania.

== Legacy ==
He was a grandfather of noted American sculptor and poet Blanche Nevin (1841–1925).

== Sources ==
- United States Congress. "Robert Jenkins (id: J000087)". Biographical Directory of the United States Congress.

U.S. House of Representatives
Preceded by Isaac Anderson and John Whitehill	Member of the U.S. House of Representatives from Pennsylvania's 3rd congressional district 1807–1811; 1807–1809 alongside: John Hiester and Matthias Richards; 1809–1811 alongside: Daniel Hiester and Matthias Richards	Succeeded by Roger Davis; John M. Hyneman and Joseph Lefever
