= Matthias Richards =

American politician (1758–1830)

Matthias Richards (February 26, 1758 – August 4, 1830) was a member of the United States House of Representatives from Pennsylvania.

== Early life and education ==
Matthias Richards was born near Pottstown, Pennsylvania. He had many siblings, including an older brother John Richards. His schooling was with a private tutoring, as was typical of many families then.

== Revolutionary War ==
He enlisted and served during the American Revolutionary War as a private in Col. Daniel Udree's second battalion, Berks County Militia, from August 5, 1777, until January 5, 1778. He was commissioned a major of the Fourth Battalion, Philadelphia County Militia in 1780.

== Career ==
In 1788 Richards was appointed a justice of the peace and held this office for forty years. He was appointed a judge of Berks County Courts (1791–1797) by Governor Shulze, a nephew.

After being elected to Congress, Richards was appointed an inspector of customs (1801–1802). He was appointed collector of revenue for the ninth district of Pennsylvania in 1813, and clerk of the orphans' court for Berks County in 1823. He also worked at mercantile pursuits in Reading, Pennsylvania, until his death there on August 4, 1830.

== Marriage and family ==
Having become an artisan and saddler, Richards married Maria Salome Muhlenberg ("Sally"), then at age 15, on May 8, 1782. She was the youngest child of Henry Melchior Muhlenberg. Among their children was John William Richards, who became a minister. His son Matthias Henry Richards became a professor of English at Muhlenberg College in 1868. His grandson Henry Melchior Muhlenberg Richards was an American military officer who served in the Union Army during the American Civil War and then as a Captain in the United States Navy during the Spanish–American War. Henry Melchior Muhlenberg Richards also married a Van Leer whose family owned most of Reading, Pennsylvania at the time. This is where Richards was laid to rest and the city where he spent most of his life, and was interred at that city's Charles Evans Cemetery.

== Congress ==
Richards was elected as a Democratic-Republican to the Tenth and Eleventh Congresses. He did not stand for renomination in 1810.

U.S. House of Representatives
Preceded by Isaac Anderson and John Whitehill	Member of the U.S. House of Representatives from Pennsylvania's 3rd congressional district 1807–1811; 1807–1809 alongside: John Hiester and Robert Jenkins; 1809–1811 alongside: Daniel Hiester and Robert Jenkins	Succeeded by Roger Davis; John M. Hyneman and Joseph Lefever
