= Roger Davis (Pennsylvania politician) =

American politician

Member of the U.S. House of Representatives from Pennsylvania
- In office March 4, 1811 – March 3, 1815
- Preceded by: Robert Jenkins; Matthias Richards; Daniel Hiester
- Succeeded by: William Darlington; John Hahn
- Constituency: 3rd district (1811–1813); 2nd district (1813–1815)

Member of the Pennsylvania House of Representatives
- In office 1809-1811

Personal details
- Born: October 2, 1762 Charlestown Village, Province of Pennsylvania, British America
- Died: November 20, 1815 (aged 53) Charlestown Township, Pennsylvania, U.S.
- Party: Democratic-Republican

Roger Davis (October 2, 1762 – November 20, 1815) was a member of the U.S. House of Representatives from Pennsylvania.

Roger Davis was born in Charlestown Village in the Province of Pennsylvania. He studied medicine at the University of Pennsylvania and commenced practice about 1785 in Charlestown. He was a member of the Pennsylvania House of Representatives from 1809 to 1811.

Davis was elected as a Republican to the Twelfth and Thirteenth Congresses. He resumed the practice of medicine in Charlestown, where he died in 1815, and was interred in Great Valley Presbyterian Churchyard.

== Sources ==
- United States Congress. "Roger Davis (id: D000133)". Biographical Directory of the United States Congress.
- The Political Graveyard

U.S. House of Representatives
Preceded by Robert Jenkins; Matthias Richards; Daniel Hiester	Member of the U.S. House of Representatives from Pennsylvania's 3rd congressional district 1811–1813 alongside: John M. Hyneman and Joseph Lefever	Succeeded by John Gloninger; James Whitehill
Preceded by Jonathan Roberts; Robert Brown; William Rodman	Member of the U.S. House of Representatives from Pennsylvania's 2nd congressional district 1813–1815 1813–1814 alongside: Jonathan Roberts; 1814–1815 alongside: Samuel Henderson	Succeeded by William Darlington; John Hahn
