= 1812–13 United States House of Representatives elections =

House elections for the 13th U.S. Congress

- August 3, 1812 – April 30, 1813

All 182 seats in the United States House of Representatives 92 seats needed for a majority
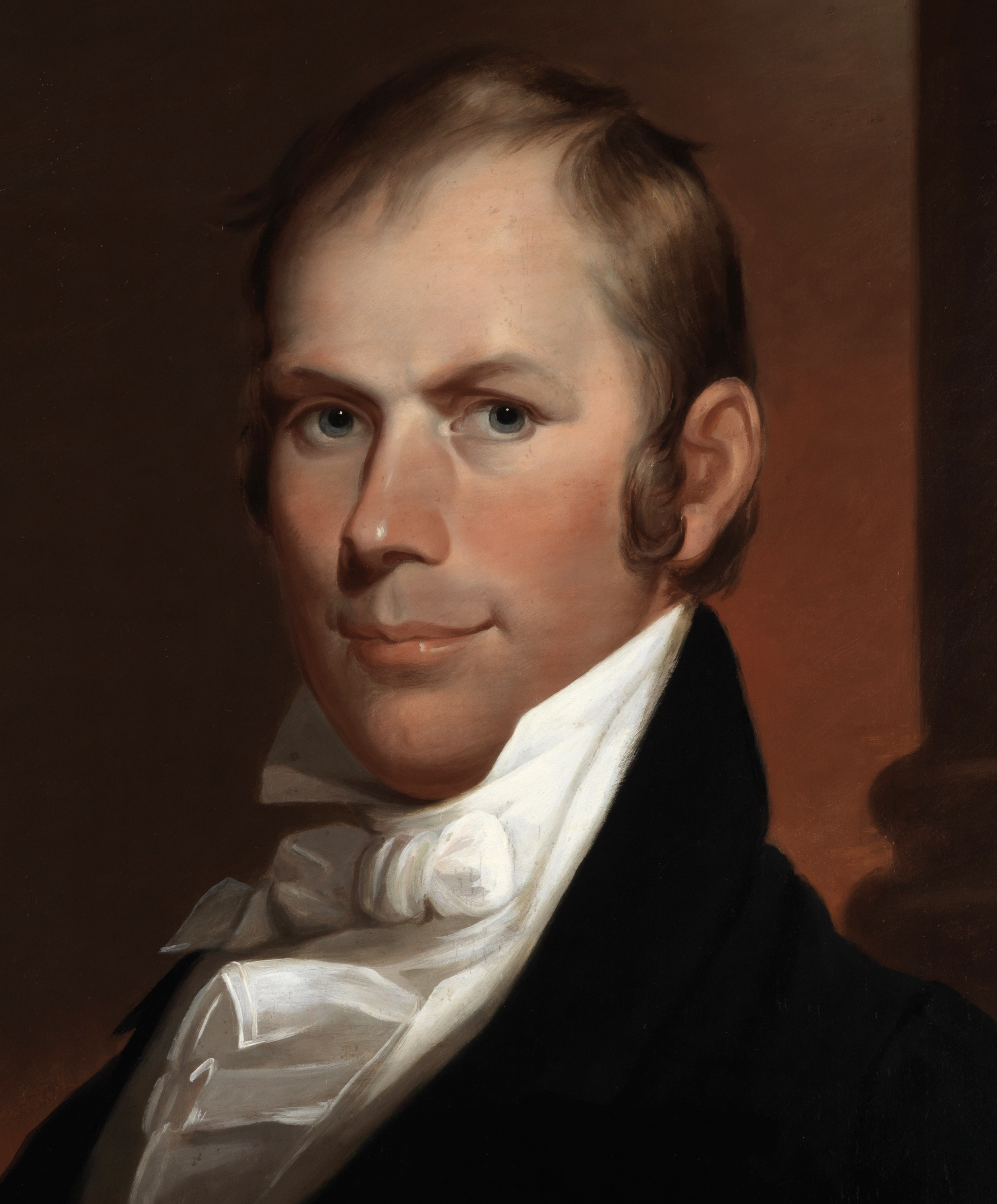

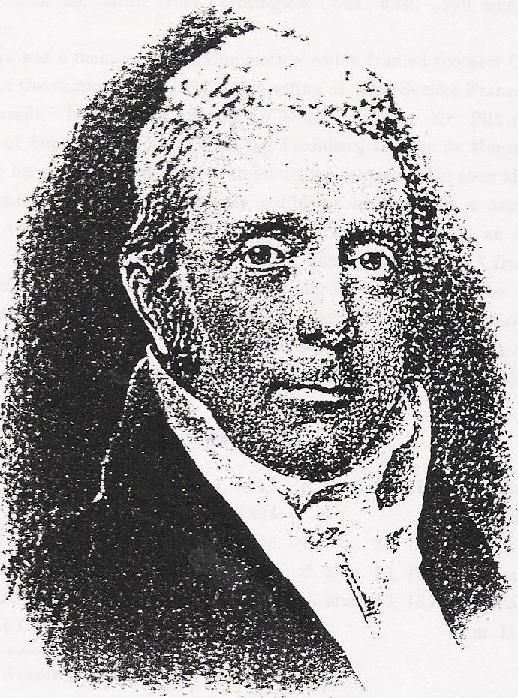
	Majority party	Minority party
Leader	Henry Clay	Timothy Pitkin
Party	Democratic-Republican	Federalist
Leader's seat	Kentucky 2nd	Connecticut at-large
Last election	107 seats	36 seats
Seats won	114	68
Seat change	▲7	▲32
- Results: Democratic-Republican hold Democratic-Republican gain Federalist hold Federalist gain
Speaker before election
Henry Clay
Democratic-Republican
Elected Speaker
Henry Clay
Democratic-Republican

The 1812–13 United States House of Representatives elections were held on various dates in various states between August 3, 1812, and April 30, 1813. Each state set its own date for its elections to the House of Representatives before the first session of the 13th United States Congress convened on May 24, 1813. They coincided with James Madison being re-elected president.

With the addition of the new state of Louisiana's at-large seat, along with the 39-seat gain as a result of the congressional reapportionment based on the 1810 United States census, the size of the House increased to 182 seats. Most relative population growth was in the West.

After America's entry into the War of 1812 against Britain, the Democratic-Republican and Federalist parties maintained pro-war and anti-war positions, respectively. Democratic-Republican representatives supported by voters in agrarian regions and Southern and Western states promoted war, asserting that Britain had violated American sovereignty and that despite Britain's strength, war was a manageable risk. Federalists and their supporters in New England and more densely populated Eastern districts opposed the war, citing likely damage to American trade and infrastructure.

This election saw significant voter support shift to the declining Federalists for the last time, almost entirely in New England, New York, and New Jersey. Despite this shift, Federalists did not approach national political recovery, House control, or meaningful policy influence.

== Election summaries ==
Following the 1810 census, the House was reapportioned, adding 39 new seats.

↓
114	68
Democratic-Republican	Federalist

State	Type	Date	Total seats		Democratic- Republican		Federalist	
State	Type	Date	Seats	Change	Seats	Change	Seats	Change
Kentucky	District	August 3, 1812	10	▲4	10	▲4	0	Steady
Rhode Island	At-large	August 25, 1812	2	Steady	0	Steady	2	Steady
New Hampshire	At-large	August 31, 1812	6	▲1	0	▼4	6	▲5
Vermont	At-large	September 1, 1812	6	▲2	6	▲3	0	▼1
Connecticut	At-large	September 21, 1812	7	Steady	0	Steady	7	Steady
Louisiana	At-large	September 28–30, 1812	1	Steady	1	Steady	0	Steady
Georgia	At-large	October 5, 1812	6	▲2	6	▲2	0	Steady
Delaware	At-large	October 6, 1812	2	▲1	0	Steady	2	▲1
Maryland	Districts	October 12, 1812	9	Steady	6	Steady	3	Steady
South Carolina	Districts	October 12–13, 1812	9	▲1	9	▲1	0	Steady
Ohio	Districts	October 13, 1812	6	▲5	6	▲5	0	Steady
Pennsylvania	Districts	October 13, 1812	23	▲5	22	▲5	1	Steady
Massachusetts	Districts	November 5, 1812 (Note: Massachusetts law required a majority to elect, which was not met in the 19th district, so a second election was held January 6, 1813.)	20	▲3	4	▼5	16	▲8
New York	Districts	December 15–17, 1812	27	▲10	9	▼3	18	▲13
New Jersey	Districts	January 12–13, 1813	6	Steady	2	▼4	4	▲4
Late elections (after the March 4, 1813, beginning of the next Congress)
Virginia	Districts	April 1813	23	▲1	17	Steady	6	▲1
Tennessee	Districts	April 1–2, 1813	6	▲3	6	▲3	0	Steady
North Carolina	Districts	April 30, 1813	13	▲1	10	Steady	3	▲1
Total			182	▲39	114 62.6%	▲7	68 37.4%	▲32

House seats
Dem-Republican	62.64%
Federalist	37.36%

== Special elections ==
There were special elections in 1812 and 1813 to the 12th United States Congress and 13th United States Congress.

Special elections are sorted by date then district.

=== 12th Congress ===
District	Incumbent			This race	
District	Member	Party	First elected	Results	Candidates (Note: Only candidates with at least 1% of the vote listed)
Massachusetts 17	Barzillai Gannett	Democratic- Republican	1808	Incumbent resigned in 1812. New member elected April 6, 1812 and seated June 3, 1812. (Note: Date given for the start of the term, of the person elected at the special election (source: Congressional Biographical Directory). In some cases this is clearly wrong as the date of the legal start of the Congress is given, even though the member was elected at a later date.); Democratic-Republican hold. Winner later lost re-election; see below.	▌ ✓ Francis Carr (Democratic-Republican) 57.5%; ▌Pitt Dillingham (Federalist) 42.5%
Georgia at-large	Howell Cobb	Democratic- Republican	1806	Incumbent resigned before October 1812 to accept a captain's commission in the U.S. Army. New member elected October 5, 1812 and seated November 27, 1812. Democratic-Republican hold. Winner also elected to the next term; see below.	▌ ✓ William Barnett (Democratic-Republican) 39.0%; ▌John Forsyth (Democratic-Republican) 38.2%; ▌Thomas Telfair (Democratic-Republican) 18.6%; ▌Thomas Carr (Democratic-Republican) (Note: Party affiliation not listed in source.) 4.3%
New York 6	Robert L. Livingston	Federalist	1808	Incumbent resigned to accept commission as a lieutenant colonel. New member elected December 15–17, 1812 and seated January 29, 1813. Federalist hold. Winner also elected to the next term; see below.	▌ ✓ Thomas P. Grosvenor (Federalist); Uncontested
North Carolina 3	Thomas Blount	Democratic- Republican	1793; 1798 (lost); 1804; 1808 (lost); 1810	Incumbent died February 7, 1812. New member elected January 11, 1813 and seated January 30, 1813. Democratic-Republican hold. Winner later re-elected; see below.	▌ ✓ William Kennedy (Democratic-Republican) 69.5%; ▌James West Clark (Democratic-Republican) 30.5%

=== 13th Congress ===
District	Incumbent			This race	
District	Member	Party	First elected	Results	Candidates
Pennsylvania 13	John Smilie	Democratic- Republican	1792; 1794 (retired); 1798	Incumbent/member-elect died December 30, 1812. New member elected February 16, 1813 and seated May 24, 1813. Democratic-Republican hold.	▌ ✓ Isaac Griffin (Democratic-Republican); [data missing]
Ohio 6	John S. Edwards	Federalist	1812	Member-elect died February 22, 1813. New member elected April 20, 1813 and seated June 8, 1813. Democratic-Republican gain.	▌ ✓ Reasin Beall (Democratic-Republican); [data missing]
New York 15	William Dowse	Federalist	1812	Member-elect died February 18, 1813. New member elected April 27–29, 1813 and seated June 21, 1813. Federalist hold.	▌ ✓ John M. Bowers (Federalist); ▌Isaac Williams Jr. (Democratic-Republican); [data missing]
New York 15	William Dowse	Federalist	1812	Election successfully challenged. Democratic-Republican gain.	▌ ✓ Isaac Williams Jr. (Democratic-Republican)
Kentucky 8	John Simpson	Democratic- Republican	1812	Member-elect died January 22, 1813. New member elected April 29, 1813 and seated May 28, 1813. Democratic-Republican hold.	▌ ✓ Stephen Ormsby (Democratic-Republican); [data missing]
Pennsylvania 15	Abner Lacock	Democratic- Republican	1810	Incumbent/member-elect resigned March 3, 1813, to become U.S. Senator. New member elected May 4, 1813 and seated May 28, 1813. Democratic-Republican hold.	▌ ✓ Thomas Wilson (Democratic-Republican); [data missing]
Ohio 3	Duncan McArthur	Democratic- Republican	1812	Member-elect resigned April 5, 1813, to stay in the state militia. New member elected May 10, 1813 and seated June 15, 1813. Democratic-Republican hold.	▌ ✓ William Creighton (Democratic-Republican); [data missing]
Pennsylvania 5	Robert Whitehill	Democratic- Republican	1805 (special)	Member-elect died April 8, 1813. New member elected May 11, 1813 and seated May 28, 1813. Democratic-Republican hold.	▌ ✓ John Rea (Democratic-Republican); [data missing]
Pennsylvania 3	John Gloninger	Federalist	1812	Incumbent resigned August 2, 1813. New member elected October 12, 1813 and seated December 6, 1813. Democratic-Republican gain.	▌ ✓ Edward Crouch (Democratic-Republican); [data missing]
Pennsylvania 7	John M. Hyneman	Democratic- Republican	1810	Incumbent resigned August 2, 1813. New member elected October 12, 1813 and seated December 6, 1813. Democratic-Republican hold.	▌ ✓ Daniel Udree (Democratic-Republican); [data missing]
Georgia at-large	William W. Bibb	Democratic- Republican	1806	Incumbent resigned after election as U.S. Senator. New member elected December 13, 1813 and seated February 7, 1814. Democratic-Republican hold.	▌ ✓ Alfred Cuthbert (Democratic-Republican); [data missing]
New York 2	Egbert Benson	Federalist	1789; 1793 (retired); 1812	Incumbent resigned August 2, 1813. New member elected December 28–30, 1813 and seated January 22, 1814. Democratic-Republican gain.	▌ ✓ William Irving (Democratic-Republican); [data missing]

== Connecticut ==
Connecticut elected its members September 21, 1812. Its apportionment was unchanged after the 1810 census.

District	Incumbent			This race	
District	Member	Party	First elected	Results	Candidates
Connecticut at-large 7 seats on a general ticket	Benjamin Tallmadge	Federalist	1801 (special)	Incumbent re-elected.	▌ ✓ Benjamin Tallmadge (Federalist) 14.6%; ▌ ✓ Timothy Pitkin (Federalist) 14.2%; ▌ ✓ John Davenport (Federalist) 13.9%; ▌ ✓ Lewis B. Sturges (Federalist) 13.8%; ▌ ✓ Jonathan O. Moseley (Federalist) 13.5%; ▌ ✓ Epaphroditus Champion (Federalist) 13.1%; ▌ ✓ Lyman Law (Federalist) 13.0%; ▌Nathan Smith (Federalist) 1.0%; ▌Sylvanus Backus (Federalist) 0.6%; ▌Samuel B. Sherwood (Federalist) 0.6%; ▌Nathaniel Terry (Federalist) 0.6%; ▌James Gould (Federalist) 0.5%; ▌Ebenezer Huntington (Federalist) 0.3%
Connecticut at-large 7 seats on a general ticket	Timothy Pitkin	Federalist	1805 (special)	Incumbent re-elected.	▌ ✓ Benjamin Tallmadge (Federalist) 14.6%; ▌ ✓ Timothy Pitkin (Federalist) 14.2%; ▌ ✓ John Davenport (Federalist) 13.9%; ▌ ✓ Lewis B. Sturges (Federalist) 13.8%; ▌ ✓ Jonathan O. Moseley (Federalist) 13.5%; ▌ ✓ Epaphroditus Champion (Federalist) 13.1%; ▌ ✓ Lyman Law (Federalist) 13.0%; ▌Nathan Smith (Federalist) 1.0%; ▌Sylvanus Backus (Federalist) 0.6%; ▌Samuel B. Sherwood (Federalist) 0.6%; ▌Nathaniel Terry (Federalist) 0.6%; ▌James Gould (Federalist) 0.5%; ▌Ebenezer Huntington (Federalist) 0.3%
Connecticut at-large 7 seats on a general ticket	John Davenport	Federalist	1798	Incumbent re-elected.	▌ ✓ Benjamin Tallmadge (Federalist) 14.6%; ▌ ✓ Timothy Pitkin (Federalist) 14.2%; ▌ ✓ John Davenport (Federalist) 13.9%; ▌ ✓ Lewis B. Sturges (Federalist) 13.8%; ▌ ✓ Jonathan O. Moseley (Federalist) 13.5%; ▌ ✓ Epaphroditus Champion (Federalist) 13.1%; ▌ ✓ Lyman Law (Federalist) 13.0%; ▌Nathan Smith (Federalist) 1.0%; ▌Sylvanus Backus (Federalist) 0.6%; ▌Samuel B. Sherwood (Federalist) 0.6%; ▌Nathaniel Terry (Federalist) 0.6%; ▌James Gould (Federalist) 0.5%; ▌Ebenezer Huntington (Federalist) 0.3%
Connecticut at-large 7 seats on a general ticket	Lewis B. Sturges	Federalist	1805 (special)	Incumbent re-elected.	▌ ✓ Benjamin Tallmadge (Federalist) 14.6%; ▌ ✓ Timothy Pitkin (Federalist) 14.2%; ▌ ✓ John Davenport (Federalist) 13.9%; ▌ ✓ Lewis B. Sturges (Federalist) 13.8%; ▌ ✓ Jonathan O. Moseley (Federalist) 13.5%; ▌ ✓ Epaphroditus Champion (Federalist) 13.1%; ▌ ✓ Lyman Law (Federalist) 13.0%; ▌Nathan Smith (Federalist) 1.0%; ▌Sylvanus Backus (Federalist) 0.6%; ▌Samuel B. Sherwood (Federalist) 0.6%; ▌Nathaniel Terry (Federalist) 0.6%; ▌James Gould (Federalist) 0.5%; ▌Ebenezer Huntington (Federalist) 0.3%
Connecticut at-large 7 seats on a general ticket	Jonathan O. Moseley	Federalist	1804	Incumbent re-elected.	▌ ✓ Benjamin Tallmadge (Federalist) 14.6%; ▌ ✓ Timothy Pitkin (Federalist) 14.2%; ▌ ✓ John Davenport (Federalist) 13.9%; ▌ ✓ Lewis B. Sturges (Federalist) 13.8%; ▌ ✓ Jonathan O. Moseley (Federalist) 13.5%; ▌ ✓ Epaphroditus Champion (Federalist) 13.1%; ▌ ✓ Lyman Law (Federalist) 13.0%; ▌Nathan Smith (Federalist) 1.0%; ▌Sylvanus Backus (Federalist) 0.6%; ▌Samuel B. Sherwood (Federalist) 0.6%; ▌Nathaniel Terry (Federalist) 0.6%; ▌James Gould (Federalist) 0.5%; ▌Ebenezer Huntington (Federalist) 0.3%
Connecticut at-large 7 seats on a general ticket	Epaphroditus Champion	Federalist	1806	Incumbent re-elected.	▌ ✓ Benjamin Tallmadge (Federalist) 14.6%; ▌ ✓ Timothy Pitkin (Federalist) 14.2%; ▌ ✓ John Davenport (Federalist) 13.9%; ▌ ✓ Lewis B. Sturges (Federalist) 13.8%; ▌ ✓ Jonathan O. Moseley (Federalist) 13.5%; ▌ ✓ Epaphroditus Champion (Federalist) 13.1%; ▌ ✓ Lyman Law (Federalist) 13.0%; ▌Nathan Smith (Federalist) 1.0%; ▌Sylvanus Backus (Federalist) 0.6%; ▌Samuel B. Sherwood (Federalist) 0.6%; ▌Nathaniel Terry (Federalist) 0.6%; ▌James Gould (Federalist) 0.5%; ▌Ebenezer Huntington (Federalist) 0.3%
Connecticut at-large 7 seats on a general ticket	Lyman Law	Federalist	1810	Incumbent re-elected.	▌ ✓ Benjamin Tallmadge (Federalist) 14.6%; ▌ ✓ Timothy Pitkin (Federalist) 14.2%; ▌ ✓ John Davenport (Federalist) 13.9%; ▌ ✓ Lewis B. Sturges (Federalist) 13.8%; ▌ ✓ Jonathan O. Moseley (Federalist) 13.5%; ▌ ✓ Epaphroditus Champion (Federalist) 13.1%; ▌ ✓ Lyman Law (Federalist) 13.0%; ▌Nathan Smith (Federalist) 1.0%; ▌Sylvanus Backus (Federalist) 0.6%; ▌Samuel B. Sherwood (Federalist) 0.6%; ▌Nathaniel Terry (Federalist) 0.6%; ▌James Gould (Federalist) 0.5%; ▌Ebenezer Huntington (Federalist) 0.3%

== Delaware ==
Delaware gained a seat after the 1810 census, and chose to elect both seats on a general ticket. The ten years between 1813 and 1823 were the only time when Delaware was represented by more than one Representative, and is one of only three states (the other two being Alaska and Wyoming) that have never been divided into districts.

Delaware elected its members October 6, 1812.

District	Incumbent			This race	
District	Member	Party	First elected	Results	Candidates
Delaware at-large 2 seats on a general ticket	Henry M. Ridgely	Federalist	1810	Incumbent re-elected.	▌ ✓ Henry M. Ridgely (Federalist) 28.3%; ▌ ✓ Thomas Cooper (Federalist) 28.2%; ▌David Hall (Democratic-Republican) 21.8%; ▌Richard Dale (Democratic-Republican) 21.7%
Delaware at-large 2 seats on a general ticket	None (seat added)			New seat. Federalist gain.	▌ ✓ Henry M. Ridgely (Federalist) 28.3%; ▌ ✓ Thomas Cooper (Federalist) 28.2%; ▌David Hall (Democratic-Republican) 21.8%; ▌Richard Dale (Democratic-Republican) 21.7%

== Georgia ==
Georgia gained two seats after the 1810 census.

Georgia elected its members October 5, 1812.

District	Incumbent			This race	
District	Member	Party	First elected	Results	Candidates
Georgia at-large 6 seats on a general ticket	William W. Bibb	Democratic-Republican	1806	Incumbent re-elected.	▌ ✓ William W. Bibb (Democratic-Republican) 18.1%; ▌ ✓ George M. Troup (Democratic-Republican) 16.8%; ▌ ✓ William Barnett (Democratic-Republican) 15.9%; ▌ ✓ Thomas Telfair (Democratic-Republican) 15.9%; ▌ ✓ Bolling Hall (Democratic-Republican) 15.1%; ▌ ✓ John Forsyth (Democratic-Republican) 14.0%; ▌George Dent (Federalist) 4.1%
Georgia at-large 6 seats on a general ticket	George M. Troup	Democratic-Republican	1806	Incumbent re-elected.	▌ ✓ William W. Bibb (Democratic-Republican) 18.1%; ▌ ✓ George M. Troup (Democratic-Republican) 16.8%; ▌ ✓ William Barnett (Democratic-Republican) 15.9%; ▌ ✓ Thomas Telfair (Democratic-Republican) 15.9%; ▌ ✓ Bolling Hall (Democratic-Republican) 15.1%; ▌ ✓ John Forsyth (Democratic-Republican) 14.0%; ▌George Dent (Federalist) 4.1%
Georgia at-large 6 seats on a general ticket	Howell Cobb	Democratic-Republican	1806	Incumbent resigned before October 1812 to accept a captain's commission in the U.S. Army. Democratic-Republican hold. Successor elected the same day to finish the current term; see above.	▌ ✓ William W. Bibb (Democratic-Republican) 18.1%; ▌ ✓ George M. Troup (Democratic-Republican) 16.8%; ▌ ✓ William Barnett (Democratic-Republican) 15.9%; ▌ ✓ Thomas Telfair (Democratic-Republican) 15.9%; ▌ ✓ Bolling Hall (Democratic-Republican) 15.1%; ▌ ✓ John Forsyth (Democratic-Republican) 14.0%; ▌George Dent (Federalist) 4.1%
Georgia at-large 6 seats on a general ticket	Bolling Hall	Democratic-Republican	1810	Incumbent re-elected.	▌ ✓ William W. Bibb (Democratic-Republican) 18.1%; ▌ ✓ George M. Troup (Democratic-Republican) 16.8%; ▌ ✓ William Barnett (Democratic-Republican) 15.9%; ▌ ✓ Thomas Telfair (Democratic-Republican) 15.9%; ▌ ✓ Bolling Hall (Democratic-Republican) 15.1%; ▌ ✓ John Forsyth (Democratic-Republican) 14.0%; ▌George Dent (Federalist) 4.1%
Georgia at-large 6 seats on a general ticket	None (seat added)			New seat. Democratic-Republican gain.	▌ ✓ William W. Bibb (Democratic-Republican) 18.1%; ▌ ✓ George M. Troup (Democratic-Republican) 16.8%; ▌ ✓ William Barnett (Democratic-Republican) 15.9%; ▌ ✓ Thomas Telfair (Democratic-Republican) 15.9%; ▌ ✓ Bolling Hall (Democratic-Republican) 15.1%; ▌ ✓ John Forsyth (Democratic-Republican) 14.0%; ▌George Dent (Federalist) 4.1%
Georgia at-large 6 seats on a general ticket	None (seat added)			New seat. Democratic-Republican gain.	▌ ✓ William W. Bibb (Democratic-Republican) 18.1%; ▌ ✓ George M. Troup (Democratic-Republican) 16.8%; ▌ ✓ William Barnett (Democratic-Republican) 15.9%; ▌ ✓ Thomas Telfair (Democratic-Republican) 15.9%; ▌ ✓ Bolling Hall (Democratic-Republican) 15.1%; ▌ ✓ John Forsyth (Democratic-Republican) 14.0%; ▌George Dent (Federalist) 4.1%

== Illinois Territory ==
See Non-voting delegates, below.

== Indiana Territory ==
See Non-voting delegates, below.

== Kentucky ==
Kentucky gained four seats after the 1810 census.

Georgia elected its members August 3, 1812.

District	Incumbent			This race	
District	Member	Party	First elected	Results	Candidates
Kentucky 1	None (new district)			New seat. Democratic-Republican gain.	▌ ✓ James Clark (Democratic-Republican); Uncontested
Kentucky 2	Henry Clay; Redistricted from the 5th district	Democratic- Republican	1810	Incumbent re-elected.	▌ ✓ Henry Clay (Democratic-Republican); Uncontested
Kentucky 3	Richard M. Johnson; Redistricted from the 4th district	Democratic- Republican	1806	Incumbent re-elected.	▌ ✓ Richard M. Johnson (Democratic-Republican); Uncontested
Kentucky 4	Joseph Desha; Redistricted from the 6th district	Democratic- Republican	1806	Incumbent re-elected.	▌ ✓ Joseph Desha (Democratic-Republican); Uncontested
Kentucky 5	Anthony New; Redistricted from the 1st district	Democratic- Republican	1810	Incumbent retired. Democratic-Republican hold.	▌ ✓ Samuel Hopkins (Democratic-Republican) 49.2%; ▌Rezin Davidge (Unknown) 31.4%; ▌Matthew Lyon (Democratic-Republican) 19.4%
Kentucky 6	None (new district)			New seat. Democratic-Republican gain.	▌ ✓ Solomon P. Sharp (Democratic-Republican) 69.9%; ▌Anthony Butler (Unknown) 30.1%
Kentucky 7	Samuel McKee; Redistricted from the 2nd district	Democratic- Republican	1808	Incumbent re-elected.	▌ ✓ Samuel McKee (Democratic-Republican); Uncontested
Kentucky 8	Stephen Ormsby; Redistricted from the 3rd district	Democratic- Republican	1810	Incumbent lost re-election. Democratic-Republican hold. Successor died January 22, 1813, leading to a special election; see above.	▌ ✓ John Simpson (Democratic-Republican) (Note: Detailed records not available, said to have won "by a small margin."); ▌Stephen Ormsby (Democratic-Republican)
Kentucky 9	None (new district)			New seat. Democratic-Republican gain.	▌ ✓ Thomas Montgomery (Democratic-Republican) (Note: Vote counts not available, won by a margin of 62 votes.); ▌Henry James (Unknown); ▌Micah Taul (Democratic-Republican)
Kentucky 10	None (new district)			New seat. Democratic-Republican gain.	▌ ✓ William P. Duval (Democratic-Republican) (Note: Numbers of votes missing or incomplete in source.)

== Louisiana ==
Louisiana held its election for the 13th Congress September 28–30, 1812, at the same time as the election for the 12th Congress, with nearly-identical results.

=== 12th Congress ===
District	Incumbent			This race	
District	Member	Party	First elected	Results	Candidates
Louisiana at-large	None (new state)			New district, seat created. New member elected September 28–30, 1812 and seated December 23, 1812. Democratic-Republican gain. Winner elected on the same ballot to the next term; see below.	▌ ✓ Thomas B. Robertson (Democratic-Republican) 35.1%; ▌Henry Johnson (Democratic-Republican) 22.8%; ▌Stephen Hopkins (Unknown) 18.1%; ▌Edward Livingston (Democratic-Republican) 12.0%; ▌Elegis Fromentin (Unknown) 11.6%

=== 13th Congress ===
District	Incumbent			This race	
District	Member	Party	First elected	Results	Candidates
Louisiana at-large	None (new state)			New district, seat created. New member elected September 28–30, 1812. Democratic-Republican gain. Successor elected the same day to finish the current term; see above.	▌ ✓ Thomas B. Robertson (Democratic-Republican) 35.3%; ▌Henry Johnson (Democratic-Republican) 22.5%; ▌Stephen Hopkins (Unknown) 18.3%; ▌Edward Livingston (Democratic-Republican) 12.7%; ▌Elegis Fromentin (Unknown) 10.4%

== Maryland ==
Maryland's apportionment was unchanged. It elected its members October 12, 1812.

District	Incumbent			This race	
District	Member	Party	First elected	Results	Candidates
Maryland 1	Philip Stuart	Federalist	1810	Incumbent re-elected.	▌ ✓ Philip Stuart (Federalist) 98.9%
Maryland 2	Joseph Kent	Democratic-Republican	1810	Incumbent re-elected.	▌ ✓ Joseph Kent (Democratic-Republican) 52.0%; ▌Archibald Van Horne (Federalist) 48.0%
Maryland 3	Philip Barton Key	Federalist	1806	Incumbent retired. Federalist hold.	▌ ✓ Alexander C. Hanson (Federalist) 60.3%; ▌John Linthicum (Democratic-Republican) 39.7%
Maryland 4	Samuel Ringgold	Democratic-Republican	1810	Incumbent re-elected.	▌ ✓ Samuel Ringgold (Democratic-Republican) 53.5%; ▌Roger B. Taney (Federalist) 46.5%
Maryland 5 Plural district with 2 seats	Alexander McKim	Democratic-Republican	1808	Incumbent re-elected.	▌ ✓ Alexander McKim (Democratic-Republican) 38.0%; ▌ ✓ Nicholas R. Moore (Democratic-Republican) 32.7%; ▌Peter Little (Democratic-Republican) 29.2%
Maryland 5 Plural district with 2 seats	Peter Little	Democratic-Republican	1810	Incumbent lost re-election. Democratic-Republican hold.	▌ ✓ Alexander McKim (Democratic-Republican) 38.0%; ▌ ✓ Nicholas R. Moore (Democratic-Republican) 32.7%; ▌Peter Little (Democratic-Republican) 29.2%
Maryland 6	Stevenson Archer	Democratic-Republican	1811 (special)	Incumbent re-elected.	▌ ✓ Stevenson Archer (Democratic-Republican) 99.9%
Maryland 7	Robert Wright	Democratic-Republican	1810 (special)	Incumbent re-elected.	▌ ✓ Robert Wright (Democratic-Republican) 53.7%; ▌Samuel W. Thomas (Federalist) 46.3%
Maryland 8	Charles Goldsborough	Federalist	1804	Incumbent re-elected.	▌ ✓ Charles Goldsborough (Federalist) 64.7%; ▌Thomas Williams (Democratic-Republican) 35.3%

== Massachusetts ==
Massachusetts gained three seats after the 1810 census, all of which were added to the District of Maine. Its elections were held November 5, 1812, but since Massachusetts law required a majority for election, which was not met in the 19th district, a second ballot was held there January 6, 1813.

District	Incumbent			This race	
District	Member	Party	First elected	Results	Candidates
Massachusetts 1 "Suffolk district"	Josiah Quincy	Federalist	1804	Incumbent retired. Federalist hold.	▌ ✓ Artemas Ward Jr. (Federalist) 98.7%; Others 1.3%
Massachusetts 2 "Essex South district"	William Reed	Federalist	1810	Incumbent re-elected.	▌ ✓ William Reed (Federalist) 56.1%; ▌Benjamin W. Crowninshield (Democratic-Republican) 43.9%
Massachusetts 3 "Essex North district"	Leonard White	Federalist	1810	Incumbent retired. Federalist hold.	▌ ✓ Timothy Pickering (Federalist) 95.6%; Others 4.4%
Massachusetts 4 "Middlesex district"	William M. Richardson	Democratic- Republican	1811 (special)	Incumbent re-elected.	▌ ✓ William M. Richardson (Democratic-Republican) 51.8%; ▌Asahel Stearns (Federalist) 46.8%; ▌William Reed (Democratic-Republican) 1.4%
Massachusetts 5 "Hampshire South district"	William Ely	Federalist	1804	Incumbent re-elected.	▌ ✓ William Ely (Federalist) 67.5%; ▌Enos Foot (Democratic-Republican) 19.6%; ▌Joseph Lyman (Federalist) 11.3%; ▌Samuel Fowler (Democratic-Republican) 1.6%
Massachusetts 6 "Hampshire North district"	Samuel Taggart	Federalist	1803	Incumbent re-elected.	▌ ✓ Samuel Taggart (Federalist) 87.3%; ▌Solomon Snead (Democratic-Republican) 9.3%; ▌Joseph Rice (Federalist) 3.4%
Massachusetts 7 "Plymouth district"	Charles Turner Jr.	Democratic- Republican	1808	Incumbent lost re-election. Federalist gain.	▌ ✓ William Baylies (Federalist) 59.0%; ▌Charles Turner Jr. (Democratic-Republican) 41.0%
Massachusetts 8 "Barnstable district"	Isaiah L. Green	Democratic- Republican	1810	Incumbent lost re-election. Federalist gain.	▌ ✓ John Reed Jr. (Federalist) 67.9%; ▌Thomas Hazard Jr. (Democratic-Republican) 26.5%; ▌Isaiah L. Green (Democratic-Republican) 5.6%
Massachusetts 9 "Bristol district"	Laban Wheaton	Federalist	1808	Incumbent re-elected.	▌ ✓ Laban Wheaton (Federalist) 60.2%; ▌John Hawes (Democratic-Republican) 39.8%
Massachusetts 10 "Worcester South district"	Elijah Brigham	Federalist	1810	Incumbent re-elected.	▌ ✓ Elijah Brigham (Federalist) 55.1%; ▌Estes Howe (Democratic-Republican) 44.4%; ▌Jonas Sibley (Democratic-Republican) 0.6%
Massachusetts 11 "Worcester North district"	Abijah Bigelow	Federalist	1810	Incumbent re-elected.	▌ ✓ Abijah Bigelow (Federalist) 76.6%; ▌Edmund Cushing (Democratic-Republican) 23.4%
Massachusetts 12 "Berkshire district"	Ezekiel Bacon	Democratic- Republican	1807 (special)	Incumbent retired. Federalist gain.	▌ ✓ Daniel Dewey (Federalist) 53.4%; ▌Samuel Wheeler (Democratic-Republican) 46.6%
Massachusetts 13 "Norfolk district"	Ebenezer Seaver	Democratic- Republican	1802	Incumbent lost re-election. Federalist gain.	▌ ✓ Nathaniel Ruggles (Federalist) 55.3%; ▌Ebenezer Seaver (Democratic-Republican) 44.7%
Massachusetts 14 "1st Eastern district" District of Maine	Richard Cutts	Democratic- Republican	1801	Incumbent lost re-election. Federalist gain.	▌ ✓ Cyrus King (Federalist) 59.3%; ▌Richard Cutts (Democratic-Republican) 37.8%; Others 2.9%
Massachusetts 15 "2nd Eastern district" District of Maine	William Widgery	Democratic- Republican	1810	Incumbent lost re-election. Federalist gain.	▌ ✓ George Bradbury (Federalist) 58.2%; ▌William Widgery (Democratic-Republican) 41.8%
Massachusetts 16 "3rd Eastern district" District of Maine	None (new district)			New seat. Federalist gain.	▌ ✓ Samuel Davis (Federalist) 61.5%; ▌Benjamin Ames (Democratic-Republican) 38.5%
Massachusetts 17 "4th Eastern district" District of Maine	None (new district)			New seat. Democratic-Republican gain.	▌ ✓ Abiel Wood (Democratic-Republican) 85.5%; ▌Joshua Head (Federalist) 5.8%; Others 8.8%
Massachusetts 18 "5th Eastern district" District of Maine	Francis Carr; Redistricted from the 17th district	Democratic- Republican	1812 (special)	Incumbent lost re-election. Federalist gain.	▌ ✓ John Wilson (Federalist) 57.7%; ▌Francis Carr (Democratic-Republican) 42.3%
Massachusetts 19 "6th Eastern district" District of Maine	None (new district)			New seat. Democratic-Republican gain.	First ballot (November 5, 1812): ▌James Parker (Democratic-Republican) 49.3%; ▌Thomas Rice (Federalist) 49.0%; Others 1.7%; Second ballot (January 6, 1813): ▌ ✓ James Parker (Democratic-Republican) 54.8%; ▌Thomas Rice (Federalist) 45.2%
Massachusetts 20 "7th Eastern district" District of Maine	None (new district)			New seat. Democratic-Republican gain.	▌ ✓ Levi Hubbard (Democratic-Republican) 52.6%; ▌Ebenezer Fessenden (Federalist) 47.4%

== Mississippi Territory ==
See Non-voting delegates, below.

== Missouri Territory ==
See Non-voting delegates, below.

== New Hampshire ==
New Hampshire gained one seat after the 1810 census. Its elections were held August 31, 1812.

District	Incumbent			This race	
District	Member	Party	First elected	Results	Candidates
New Hampshire at-large 6 seats on a general ticket	Josiah Bartlett Jr.	Democratic- Republican	1810	Incumbent retired. Federalist gain.	▌ ✓ Roger Vose (Federalist) 9.0%; ▌ ✓ Daniel Webster (Federalist) 9.0%; ▌ ✓ Bradbury Cilley (Federalist) 9.0%; ▌ ✓ William Hale (Federalist) 9.0%; ▌ ✓ Samuel Smith (Federalist) 9.0%; ▌ ✓ Jeduthun Wilcox (Federalist) 8.9%; ▌David Morrill (Democratic-Republican) 7.7%; ▌John Parrott (Democratic-Republican) 7.7%; ▌Samuel Dinsmoor (Democratic-Republican) 7.7%; ▌John Adams Harper (Democratic-Republican) 7.7%; ▌Jesse Johnson (Democratic-Republican) 7.7%; ▌Josiah Butler (Democratic-Republican) 7.6%
New Hampshire at-large 6 seats on a general ticket	Samuel Dinsmoor	Democratic- Republican	1810	Incumbent lost re-election. Federalist gain.	▌ ✓ Roger Vose (Federalist) 9.0%; ▌ ✓ Daniel Webster (Federalist) 9.0%; ▌ ✓ Bradbury Cilley (Federalist) 9.0%; ▌ ✓ William Hale (Federalist) 9.0%; ▌ ✓ Samuel Smith (Federalist) 9.0%; ▌ ✓ Jeduthun Wilcox (Federalist) 8.9%; ▌David Morrill (Democratic-Republican) 7.7%; ▌John Parrott (Democratic-Republican) 7.7%; ▌Samuel Dinsmoor (Democratic-Republican) 7.7%; ▌John Adams Harper (Democratic-Republican) 7.7%; ▌Jesse Johnson (Democratic-Republican) 7.7%; ▌Josiah Butler (Democratic-Republican) 7.6%
New Hampshire at-large 6 seats on a general ticket	Obed Hall	Democratic- Republican	1811	Incumbent retired. Federalist gain.	▌ ✓ Roger Vose (Federalist) 9.0%; ▌ ✓ Daniel Webster (Federalist) 9.0%; ▌ ✓ Bradbury Cilley (Federalist) 9.0%; ▌ ✓ William Hale (Federalist) 9.0%; ▌ ✓ Samuel Smith (Federalist) 9.0%; ▌ ✓ Jeduthun Wilcox (Federalist) 8.9%; ▌David Morrill (Democratic-Republican) 7.7%; ▌John Parrott (Democratic-Republican) 7.7%; ▌Samuel Dinsmoor (Democratic-Republican) 7.7%; ▌John Adams Harper (Democratic-Republican) 7.7%; ▌Jesse Johnson (Democratic-Republican) 7.7%; ▌Josiah Butler (Democratic-Republican) 7.6%
New Hampshire at-large 6 seats on a general ticket	John Adams Harper	Democratic- Republican	1811	Incumbent lost re-election. Federalist gain.	▌ ✓ Roger Vose (Federalist) 9.0%; ▌ ✓ Daniel Webster (Federalist) 9.0%; ▌ ✓ Bradbury Cilley (Federalist) 9.0%; ▌ ✓ William Hale (Federalist) 9.0%; ▌ ✓ Samuel Smith (Federalist) 9.0%; ▌ ✓ Jeduthun Wilcox (Federalist) 8.9%; ▌David Morrill (Democratic-Republican) 7.7%; ▌John Parrott (Democratic-Republican) 7.7%; ▌Samuel Dinsmoor (Democratic-Republican) 7.7%; ▌John Adams Harper (Democratic-Republican) 7.7%; ▌Jesse Johnson (Democratic-Republican) 7.7%; ▌Josiah Butler (Democratic-Republican) 7.6%
New Hampshire at-large 6 seats on a general ticket	George Sullivan	Federalist	1811	Incumbent retired. Federalist hold.	▌ ✓ Roger Vose (Federalist) 9.0%; ▌ ✓ Daniel Webster (Federalist) 9.0%; ▌ ✓ Bradbury Cilley (Federalist) 9.0%; ▌ ✓ William Hale (Federalist) 9.0%; ▌ ✓ Samuel Smith (Federalist) 9.0%; ▌ ✓ Jeduthun Wilcox (Federalist) 8.9%; ▌David Morrill (Democratic-Republican) 7.7%; ▌John Parrott (Democratic-Republican) 7.7%; ▌Samuel Dinsmoor (Democratic-Republican) 7.7%; ▌John Adams Harper (Democratic-Republican) 7.7%; ▌Jesse Johnson (Democratic-Republican) 7.7%; ▌Josiah Butler (Democratic-Republican) 7.6%
New Hampshire at-large 6 seats on a general ticket	None (seat added)			New seat. Federalist gain.	▌ ✓ Roger Vose (Federalist) 9.0%; ▌ ✓ Daniel Webster (Federalist) 9.0%; ▌ ✓ Bradbury Cilley (Federalist) 9.0%; ▌ ✓ William Hale (Federalist) 9.0%; ▌ ✓ Samuel Smith (Federalist) 9.0%; ▌ ✓ Jeduthun Wilcox (Federalist) 8.9%; ▌David Morrill (Democratic-Republican) 7.7%; ▌John Parrott (Democratic-Republican) 7.7%; ▌Samuel Dinsmoor (Democratic-Republican) 7.7%; ▌John Adams Harper (Democratic-Republican) 7.7%; ▌Jesse Johnson (Democratic-Republican) 7.7%; ▌Josiah Butler (Democratic-Republican) 7.6%

== New Jersey ==
New Jersey kept its delegation at six seats but changed from electing its Representatives on a statewide general ticket to using three plural districts of two seats each. These districts were used only for the 1812 election, and the state returned to using a single at-large district in 1814. This was only the second time that New Jersey used districts (the first being in 1798).

There was a statewide at-large election held in November 1812, that was invalidated:

In October 1812, when the Federalists captured the State Legislature, both parties had already nominated their tickets for Presidential Electors and Congress. That election was scheduled for November 1812. However, … the Federalist[s], now controlling the legislature, changed the method of selecting Presidential Electors, from popular vote, to a choice by the Legislature and as a result the election for Presidential Electors was invalidated. In addition to changing the method of choosing Presidential electors, the Federalist also decided to alter the election of congressmen from state wide At-Large to Districts. The scheduled November elections were postponed and three separate Districts were created, each electing two Congressmen. This election was held January 12th and 13th 1813. Some towns, either because word of these changes did not reach them in time, or most likely in defiance, went ahead and held elections. The Republican ticket received almost all of the votes cast, with the Federalist getting only a single votes in two towns, which suggests they were protesting the changes made by the Legislature. These returns were never reported in the newspapers.

— "New Jersey 1812 U.S. House of Representatives (Note 1)". Tufts Digital Collations and Archives. A New Nation Votes: American Election Returns 1787–1825. Tufts University. Archived from the original on August 7, 2020.

District	Incumbent			This race	
District	Member	Party	First elected	Results	Candidates
New Jersey 1 "Northern district" Plural district with 2 seats	Lewis Condict; Redistricted from the at-large district	Democratic- Republican	1810	Incumbent re-elected.	▌ ✓ Lewis Condict (Democratic-Republican) 38.8%; ▌ ✓ Thomas Ward (Democratic-Republican) 38.3%; ▌Jacob S. Thompson (Federalist) 11.3%; ▌John M. Cumming (Federalist) 9.7%; ▌Adam Boyd (Federalist) 2.0%
New Jersey 1 "Northern district" Plural district with 2 seats	Adam Boyd; Redistricted from the at-large district	Democratic- Republican	1803; 1804 (retired); 1808 (special)	Incumbent lost re-election. Democratic-Republican hold.	▌ ✓ Lewis Condict (Democratic-Republican) 38.8%; ▌ ✓ Thomas Ward (Democratic-Republican) 38.3%; ▌Jacob S. Thompson (Federalist) 11.3%; ▌John M. Cumming (Federalist) 9.7%; ▌Adam Boyd (Federalist) 2.0%
New Jersey 2 "Central district" Plural district with 2 seats	James Morgan; Redistricted from the at-large district	Democratic- Republican	1810	Incumbent lost re-election. Federalist gain.	▌ ✓ James Schureman (Federalist) 27.9%; ▌ ✓ Richard Stockton (Federalist) 27.8%; ▌Henry Southard (Democratic-Republican) 22.3%; ▌James Morgan (Democratic-Republican) 22.0%
New Jersey 2 "Central district" Plural district with 2 seats	George C. Maxwell; Redistricted from the at-large district	Democratic- Republican	1810	Incumbent lost re-election. Federalist gain.	▌ ✓ James Schureman (Federalist) 27.9%; ▌ ✓ Richard Stockton (Federalist) 27.8%; ▌Henry Southard (Democratic-Republican) 22.3%; ▌James Morgan (Democratic-Republican) 22.0%
New Jersey 3 "Southern district" Plural district with 2 seats	Thomas Newbold; Redistricted from the at-large district	Democratic- Republican	1806	Incumbent lost re-election. Federalist gain.	▌ ✓ William Coxe Jr. (Federalist) 49.8%; ▌ ✓ Jacob Hufty (Federalist) 49.5%; Others 0.7%
New Jersey 3 "Southern district" Plural district with 2 seats	Jacob Hufty; Redistricted from the at-large district	Democratic- Republican	1808	Incumbent re-elected as a Federalist. Federalist gain.	▌ ✓ William Coxe Jr. (Federalist) 49.8%; ▌ ✓ Jacob Hufty (Federalist) 49.5%; Others 0.7%

== New York ==
Ten seats were added after the 1810 census, bringing New York's representation to 27, the largest of any state at the time. New York would remain the state with the most members until surpassed by California in the 1970 census. There were two separate House of Representatives elections in 1812. The first was held in April 1812 for an un-reapportioned 17 representatives. This election was subsequently declared void and a new election was held on December 15–17, 1812, in which only three incumbents ran and two of whom were re-elected. New York thereby lost 4 Democratic-Republicans and gained 14 Federalists.

District	Incumbent			This race	
District	Member	Party	First elected	Results	Candidates
New York 1 Plural district with 2 seats	Ebenezer Sage	Democratic- Republican	1810	Incumbent re-elected. Results of the election were contested but no action was taken by the House.	▌ ✓ John Lefferts (Democratic-Republican) 25.3%; ▌ ✓ Ebenezer Sage (Democratic-Republican) 25.2%; ▌Peter A. Jay (Federalist) 24.8%; ▌Benjamin B. Blydenburgh (Federalist) 24.7%
New York 1 Plural district with 2 seats	None (second seat added)			New seat. Democratic-Republican gain.	▌ ✓ John Lefferts (Democratic-Republican) 25.3%; ▌ ✓ Ebenezer Sage (Democratic-Republican) 25.2%; ▌Peter A. Jay (Federalist) 24.8%; ▌Benjamin B. Blydenburgh (Federalist) 24.7%
New York 2 Plural district with 2 seats	Samuel L. Mitchill	Democratic- Republican	1810	Incumbent retired. Federalist gain.	▌ ✓ Egbert Benson (Federalist) 25.9%; ▌ ✓ Jotham Post Jr. (Federalist) 25.5%; ▌John Ferguson (Democratic-Republican) 24.3%; ▌William Irving (Democratic-Republican) 24.2%
New York 2 Plural district with 2 seats	William Paulding Jr.	Democratic- Republican	1810	Incumbent retired. Federalist gain.	▌ ✓ Egbert Benson (Federalist) 25.9%; ▌ ✓ Jotham Post Jr. (Federalist) 25.5%; ▌John Ferguson (Democratic-Republican) 24.3%; ▌William Irving (Democratic-Republican) 24.2%
New York 3	Pierre Van Cortlandt Jr.	Democratic- Republican	1810	Incumbent lost re-election. Democratic-Republican hold.	▌ ✓ Peter Denoyelles (Democratic-Republican) 43.3%; ▌Richard V. Morris (Federalist) 39.1%; ▌Pierre Van Cortlandt Jr. (Democratic-Republican) 17.6%
New York 4	James Emott	Federalist	1808	Incumbent retired. Federalist hold.	▌ ✓ Thomas J. Oakley (Federalist) 57.3%; ▌Theodorus R. Van Wyck (Democratic-Republican) 42.7%
New York 5	Robert L. Livingston; Redistricted from the 6th district (second seat)	Federalist	1808	Incumbent resigned May 6, 1812, to accept a commission as a lieutenant colonel. Federalist hold. Successor also elected the same day to finish the term; see above.	▌ ✓ Thomas P. Grosvenor (Federalist) 97.5%
New York 5	Thomas B. Cooke	Democratic- Republican	1810	Incumbent retired. Democratic-Republican loss.	▌ ✓ Thomas P. Grosvenor (Federalist) 97.5%
New York 6	Asa Fitch	Federalist	1810	Incumbent retired. Democratic-Republican gain.	▌ ✓ Jonathan Fisk (Democratic-Republican) 51.4%; ▌John Bradner (Federalist)28.4%; ▌Anthony Davis (Federalist) 20.1%
New York 7	Harmanus Bleecker	Federalist	1810	Incumbent retired. Democratic-Republican gain.	▌ ✓ Abraham J. Hasbrouck (Democratic-Republican) 52.3%; ▌Abraham T. E. De Witt (Federalist) 47.7%
New York 8	Benjamin Pond	Democratic- Republican	1810	Incumbent retired. Federalist gain.	▌ ✓ Samuel Sherwood (Federalist) 53.6%; ▌John Ely (Democratic-Republican) 46.4%
New York 9	Thomas Sammons	Democratic- Republican	1808	Incumbent retired. Federalist gain.	▌ ✓ John Lovett (Federalist)
New York 10	Silas Stow	Democratic- Republican	1810	Incumbent retired. Federalist gain.	▌ ✓ Hosea Moffitt (Federalist)
New York 11	Thomas R. Gold	Federalist	1808	Incumbent retired. Democratic-Republican gain.	▌ ✓ John W. Taylor (Democratic-Republican) 52.8%; ▌Samuel Stewart (Federalist) 47.2%
New York 12 Plural district with 2 seats	Arunah Metcalf	Democratic- Republican	1810	Incumbent retired. Federalist gain.	▌ ✓ Zebulon R. Shipherd (Federalist) 27.0%; ▌ ✓ Elisha I. Winter (Federalist) 26.5%; ▌Melancton Smith (Democratic-Republican) 22.0%; ▌Roger Skinner (Democratic-Republican) 21.8%; ▌William Livingston (Unknown) 2.8%
New York 12 Plural district with 2 seats	None (second seat added)			New seat. Federalist gain.	▌ ✓ Zebulon R. Shipherd (Federalist) 27.0%; ▌ ✓ Elisha I. Winter (Federalist) 26.5%; ▌Melancton Smith (Democratic-Republican) 22.0%; ▌Roger Skinner (Democratic-Republican) 21.8%; ▌William Livingston (Unknown) 2.8%
New York 13	Uri Tracy	Democratic- Republican	1808	Incumbent retired. Federalist gain.	▌ ✓ Alexander Boyd (Federalist) 51.2%; ▌John Gebhard (Democratic-Republican) 42.6%; ▌Jesse Shepherd (Democratic-Republican) 6.2%
New York 14	None (new district)			New seat. Federalist gain.	▌ ✓ Jacob Markell (Federalist) 55.6%; ▌James McIntyre (Democratic-Republican) 44.4%
New York 15 Plural district with 2 seats	Peter B. Porter	Democratic- Republican	1808	Incumbent retired. Federalist gain.	▌ ✓ Joel Thompson (Federalist) 26.7%; ▌ ✓ William Dowse (Federalist) 26.4%; ▌Robert Roseboom (Democratic-Republican) 23.5%; ▌Amos Patterson (Democratic-Republican) 23.4%
New York 15 Plural district with 2 seats	None (second seat added)			New seat. Federalist gain.	▌ ✓ Joel Thompson (Federalist) 26.7%; ▌ ✓ William Dowse (Federalist) 26.4%; ▌Robert Roseboom (Democratic-Republican) 23.5%; ▌Amos Patterson (Democratic-Republican) 23.4%
New York 16	None (new district)			New seat. Federalist gain.	▌ ✓ Morris S. Miller (Federalist) 63.3%; ▌George Brayton (Democratic-Republican) 36.7%
New York 17	None (new district)			New seat. Federalist gain.	▌ ✓ William S. Smith (Federalist) 56.9%; ▌Hubbard Smith (Democratic-Republican) 43.1%
New York 18	None (new district)			New seat. Federalist gain.	▌ ✓ Moss Kent (Federalist) 61.2%; ▌Jacob Brown (Democratic-Republican) 38.8%
New York 19	None (new district)			New seat. Federalist gain.	▌ ✓ James Geddes (Federalist) 55.7%; ▌John Miller (Democratic-Republican) 44.3%
New York 20 Plural district with 2 seats	Daniel Avery; Redistricted from 14th district	Democratic- Republican	1810	Incumbent re-elected.	▌ ✓ Oliver C. Comstock (Democratic-Republican) 32.4%; ▌ ✓ Daniel Avery (Democratic-Republican) 32.2%; ▌Elijah Miller (Federalist) 17.7%; ▌Vincent Mathews (Federalist) 17.7%
New York 20 Plural district with 2 seats	None (second seat added)			New seat. Democratic-Republican gain.	▌ ✓ Oliver C. Comstock (Democratic-Republican) 32.4%; ▌ ✓ Daniel Avery (Democratic-Republican) 32.2%; ▌Elijah Miller (Federalist) 17.7%; ▌Vincent Mathews (Federalist) 17.7%
New York 21 Plural district with 2 seats	None (new district)			New seat. Federalist gain.	▌ ✓ Nathaniel W. Howell (Federalist) 27.6%; ▌ ✓ Samuel M. Hopkins (Federalist) 27.6%; ▌Chauncey Lewis (Democratic-Republican) 22.5%; ▌Stephen Bates (Democratic-Republican) 21.9%; ▌Micah Brooks (Democratic-Republican) 0.5%
New York 21 Plural district with 2 seats	None (new district)			New seat. Federalist gain.	▌ ✓ Nathaniel W. Howell (Federalist) 27.6%; ▌ ✓ Samuel M. Hopkins (Federalist) 27.6%; ▌Chauncey Lewis (Democratic-Republican) 22.5%; ▌Stephen Bates (Democratic-Republican) 21.9%; ▌Micah Brooks (Democratic-Republican) 0.5%

== North Carolina ==
North Carolina gained one representative as a result of the census of 1810. Its elections were held April 30, 1813, after the term began but before Congress's first meeting.

District	Incumbent			This race	
District	Member	Party	First elected	Results	Candidates
North Carolina 1	Lemuel Sawyer	Democratic-Republican	1806	Incumbent lost re-election. Democratic-Republican hold.	▌ ✓ William H. Murfree (Democratic-Republican) 45.6%; ▌Joseph Riddick (Democratic-Republican) 22.1%; ▌Lemuel Sawyer (Democratic-Republican) 20.4%; ▌William Hinton (Democratic-Republican) 11.8%
North Carolina 2	Willis Alston	Democratic-Republican	1798	Incumbent re-elected.	▌ ✓ Willis Alston (Democratic-Republican) 56.0%; ▌Daniel Mason (Federalist) 44.0%
North Carolina 3	William Kennedy	Democratic-Republican	1803; 1813 (special)	Incumbent re-elected.	▌ ✓ William Kennedy (Democratic-Republican) 56.5%; ▌Robert Williams (Democratic-Republican) 43.5%
North Carolina 4	William Blackledge	Democratic-Republican	1803; 1810	Incumbent lost re-election. Federalist gain.	▌ ✓ William Gaston (Federalist) 74.6%; ▌William Blackledge (Democratic-Republican) 25.4%
North Carolina 5	William R. King	Democratic-Republican	1810	Incumbent re-elected.	▌ ✓ William R. King (Democratic-Republican) 100%
North Carolina 6	Nathaniel Macon	Democratic-Republican	1791	Incumbent re-elected.	▌ ✓ Nathaniel Macon (Democratic-Republican) 100%
North Carolina 7	Archibald McBryde	Federalist	1808	Incumbent retired. Federalist hold.	▌ ✓ John Culpepper (Federalist) 52.1%; ▌John A. Cameron (Federalist) 38.0%; ▌Duncan McFarlan (Democratic-Republican) 9.9%
North Carolina 8	Richard Stanford	Democratic-Republican	1796	Incumbent re-elected.	▌ ✓ Richard Stanford (Democratic-Republican) 61.7%; ▌James Mebane (Democratic-Republican) 38.2%
North Carolina 9	James Cochran	Democratic-Republican	1808	Incumbent retired. Democratic-Republican hold.	▌ ✓ Bartlett Yancey (Democratic-Republican) 61.1%; ▌James Martin (Federalist) 38.9%
North Carolina 10	Joseph Pearson	Federalist	1808	Incumbent re-elected.	▌ ✓ Joseph Pearson (Federalist) 54.1%; ▌Alexander Gary (Democratic-Republican) 45.9%
North Carolina 11	None (new district)			New seat. Democratic-Republican gain.	▌ ✓ Peter Forney (Democratic-Republican) 50.5%; ▌John Phifer (Federalist) 49.5%
North Carolina 12	Israel Pickens; Redistricted from the 11th district	Democratic-Republican	1810	Incumbent re-elected.	▌ ✓ Israel Pickens (Democratic-Republican); ▌Felix Walker (Democratic-Republican); ▌Joseph Hamilton (Unknown); ▌R. H. Burton (Unknown); ▌Joseph Carson (Unknown)
North Carolina 13	Meshack Franklin; Redistricted from the 12th district	Democratic-Republican	1806	Incumbent re-elected.	▌ ✓ Meshack Franklin (Democratic-Republican) 38.0%; ▌Edmund Jones (Federalist) 31.8%; ▌Lewis Williams (Democratic-Republican) 30.2%

== Ohio ==
The 1810 census revealed dramatic population growth in Ohio since 1800, resulting in its representation increasing from a single Representative to six, resulting in the State being broken up into 6 districts, abolishing the at-large district. Jeremiah Morrow (Democratic-Republican), who had served since Ohio achieved statehood in 1803, retired to run for U.S. Senator, so that all six seats were open. Its elections were held October 13, 1812.

District	Incumbent			This race	
District	Member	Party	First elected	Results	Candidates
Ohio 1	Jeremiah Morrow; Redistricted from the at-large district	Democratic- Republican	1803	Incumbent retired to run for senate. Democratic-Republican hold.	▌ ✓ John McLean (Democratic-Republican) 71.3%; ▌Ethan Stone (Federalist) 16.6%; ▌John Bigger (Federalist) 10.7%; ▌Othneil Looker (Democratic-Republican) 1.4%
Ohio 2	None (new district)			New seat. Democratic-Republican gain.	▌ ✓ John Alexander (Democratic-Republican) 38.5%; ▌John Wilson Campbell (Democratic-Republican) 35.6%; ▌Thomas Morris (Democratic-Republican) 25.9%
Ohio 3	None (new district)			New seat. Democratic-Republican gain. Successor resigned April 5, 1813, after the new Congress began but before it met, leading to a special election; see above.	▌ ✓ Duncan McArthur (Democratic-Republican) 99.9%
Ohio 4	None (new district)			New seat. Democratic-Republican gain.	▌ ✓ James Caldwell (Democratic-Republican) 51.5%; ▌Bezaleel Wells (Federalist) 43.1%; ▌James Pritchard (Democratic-Republican) 5.4%
Ohio 5	None (new district)			New seat. Democratic-Republican gain.	▌ ✓ James Kilbourne (Democratic-Republican) 24.5%; ▌Robert J. Slaughter (Democratic-Republican) 23.3%; ▌Robert Cloud (Democratic-Republican) 17.3%; ▌Joseph Foos (Democratic-Republican) 13.2%; ▌William W. Irvin (Unknown) 12.5%; ▌Joseph H. Crane (Unknown) 8.9%
Ohio 6	None (new district)			New seat. Democratic-Republican gain.	▌ ✓ John S. Edwards (Federalist) 60.0%; ▌Reasin Beall (Democratic-Republican) 38.4%

There was a special election in the 6th district, held due to the death of Representative-elect John S. Edward before Congress met. That election was won by Reasin Beall.

== Pennsylvania ==
Pennsylvania gained five seats in the House of Representatives as a result of the census of 1810, which awarded it a total of 23 seats. Pennsylvania was re-districted into 15 districts, one with 4 seats, five with 2, and the remaining nine with 1 seat each. There were seven open seats for this election, five resulting from the increase in apportionment, and two resulting from the retirement of incumbents. Its elections were held October 13, 1812.

District	Incumbent			This race	
District	Member	Party	First elected	Results	Candidates
Pennsylvania 1 Plural district with 4 seats	Adam Seybert	Democratic-Republican	1809 (special)	Incumbent re-elected.	▌ ✓ Adam Seybert (Democratic-Republican) 13.7%; ▌ ✓ William Anderson (Democratic-Republican) 13.7%; ▌ ✓ Charles J. Ingersoll (Democratic-Republican) 13.6%; ▌ ✓ John Conard (Democratic-Republican) 13.5%; ▌Joseph Hopkinson (Federalist) 11.4%; ▌Joseph S. Lewis (Federalist) 11.4%; ▌Samuel Harvey (Federalist) 11.4%; ▌William Pennock (Federalist) 11.3%
Pennsylvania 1 Plural district with 4 seats	William Anderson	Democratic-Republican	1808	Incumbent re-elected.	▌ ✓ Adam Seybert (Democratic-Republican) 13.7%; ▌ ✓ William Anderson (Democratic-Republican) 13.7%; ▌ ✓ Charles J. Ingersoll (Democratic-Republican) 13.6%; ▌ ✓ John Conard (Democratic-Republican) 13.5%; ▌Joseph Hopkinson (Federalist) 11.4%; ▌Joseph S. Lewis (Federalist) 11.4%; ▌Samuel Harvey (Federalist) 11.4%; ▌William Pennock (Federalist) 11.3%
Pennsylvania 1 Plural district with 4 seats	James Milnor	Federalist	1810	Incumbent retired. Democratic-Republican gain.	▌ ✓ Adam Seybert (Democratic-Republican) 13.7%; ▌ ✓ William Anderson (Democratic-Republican) 13.7%; ▌ ✓ Charles J. Ingersoll (Democratic-Republican) 13.6%; ▌ ✓ John Conard (Democratic-Republican) 13.5%; ▌Joseph Hopkinson (Federalist) 11.4%; ▌Joseph S. Lewis (Federalist) 11.4%; ▌Samuel Harvey (Federalist) 11.4%; ▌William Pennock (Federalist) 11.3%
Pennsylvania 1 Plural district with 4 seats	None (seat created)			New seat. Democratic-Republican gain.	▌ ✓ Adam Seybert (Democratic-Republican) 13.7%; ▌ ✓ William Anderson (Democratic-Republican) 13.7%; ▌ ✓ Charles J. Ingersoll (Democratic-Republican) 13.6%; ▌ ✓ John Conard (Democratic-Republican) 13.5%; ▌Joseph Hopkinson (Federalist) 11.4%; ▌Joseph S. Lewis (Federalist) 11.4%; ▌Samuel Harvey (Federalist) 11.4%; ▌William Pennock (Federalist) 11.3%
Pennsylvania 2 Plural district with 2 seats	Roger Davis; Redistricted from the 3rd district	Democratic-Republican	1810	Incumbent re-elected.	▌ ✓ Roger Davis (Democratic-Republican) 26.2%; ▌ ✓ Jonathan Roberts (Democratic-Republican) 26.1%; ▌Samuel Henderson (Federalist) 23.8%; ▌Francis Gardner (Federalist) 23.8%
Pennsylvania 2 Plural district with 2 seats	Jonathan Roberts	Democratic-Republican	1810	Incumbent re-elected.	▌ ✓ Roger Davis (Democratic-Republican) 26.2%; ▌ ✓ Jonathan Roberts (Democratic-Republican) 26.1%; ▌Samuel Henderson (Federalist) 23.8%; ▌Francis Gardner (Federalist) 23.8%
Pennsylvania 3 Plural district with 2 seats	Joseph Lefever	Democratic-Republican	1810	Incumbent retired. Democratic-Republican hold.	▌ ✓ James Whitehill (Democratic-Republican) 27.6%; ▌ ✓ John Gloninger (Federalist) 26.1%; ▌Jacob Bucher (Democratic-Republican) 23.9%; ▌Amos Slaymaker (Federalist) 22.4%
Pennsylvania 3 Plural district with 2 seats	None (seat added)			New seat. Federalist gain.	▌ ✓ James Whitehill (Democratic-Republican) 27.6%; ▌ ✓ John Gloninger (Federalist) 26.1%; ▌Jacob Bucher (Democratic-Republican) 23.9%; ▌Amos Slaymaker (Federalist) 22.4%
Pennsylvania 4	None (new district)			New seat. Democratic-Republican gain.	▌ ✓ Hugh Glasgow (Democratic-Republican) 58.6%; ▌Jacob Eichelberger (Federalist) 41.4%
Pennsylvania 5 Plural district with 2 seats	Robert Whitehill; Redistricted from the 4th district	Democratic-Republican	1805 (special)	Incumbent re-elected.	▌ ✓ Robert Whitehill (Democratic-Republican) 27.5%; ▌ ✓ William Crawford (Democratic-Republican) 26.9%; ▌Edward Crawford (Federalist) 22.9%; ▌James Duncan (Federalist) 22.7%
Pennsylvania 5 Plural district with 2 seats	William Crawford; Redistricted from the 6th district	Democratic-Republican	1808	Incumbent re-elected.	▌ ✓ Robert Whitehill (Democratic-Republican) 27.5%; ▌ ✓ William Crawford (Democratic-Republican) 26.9%; ▌Edward Crawford (Federalist) 22.9%; ▌James Duncan (Federalist) 22.7%
Pennsylvania 6 Plural district with 2 seats	Robert Brown; Redistricted from the 2nd district	Democratic-Republican	1798 (special)	Incumbent re-elected.	▌ ✓ Robert Brown (Democratic-Republican) 30.5%; ▌ ✓ Samuel D. Ingham (Democratic-Republican) 30.4%; ▌William Rodman (Federalist) 19.2%; ▌William Lattimore (Federalist) 18.3%; ▌Samuel Sitgreaves (Federalist) 1.7%
Pennsylvania 6 Plural district with 2 seats	William Rodman; Redistricted from the 2nd district	Democratic-Republican	1810	Incumbent lost re-election as a Federalist. Democratic-Republican hold.	▌ ✓ Robert Brown (Democratic-Republican) 30.5%; ▌ ✓ Samuel D. Ingham (Democratic-Republican) 30.4%; ▌William Rodman (Federalist) 19.2%; ▌William Lattimore (Federalist) 18.3%; ▌Samuel Sitgreaves (Federalist) 1.7%
Pennsylvania 7	John M. Hyneman; Redistricted from the 3rd district	Democratic-Republican	1810	Incumbent re-elected.	▌ ✓ John M. Hyneman (Democratic-Republican) 59.4%; ▌Daniel Rose (Federalist) 40.6%
Pennsylvania 8	William Piper; Redistricted from the 7th district	Democratic-Republican	1810	Incumbent re-elected.	▌ ✓ William Piper (Democratic-Republican) 63.5%; ▌Samuel Riddle (Federalist) 36.5%
Pennsylvania 9	David Bard; Redistricted from the 4th district	Democratic-Republican	1802	Incumbent re-elected.	▌ ✓ David Bard (Democratic-Republican) 76.0%; ▌John Blair (Federalist) 24.0%
Pennsylvania 10 Plural district with 2 seats	George Smith; Redistricted from the 5th district	Democratic-Republican	1808	Incumbent lost re-election. Democratic-Republican hold.	▌ ✓ Jared Irwin (Democratic-Republican) 23.4%; ▌ ✓ Isaac Smith (Democratic-Republican) 22.2%; ▌George Smith (Democratic-Republican) 18.8%; ▌Daniel Montgomery (Democratic-Republican) 18.3%; ▌Nathan Beach (Federalist) 8.6%; ▌Enoch Smith (Federalist) 8.6%
Pennsylvania 10 Plural district with 2 seats	None (seat added)			New seat. Democratic-Republican gain.	▌ ✓ Jared Irwin (Democratic-Republican) 23.4%; ▌ ✓ Isaac Smith (Democratic-Republican) 22.2%; ▌George Smith (Democratic-Republican) 18.8%; ▌Daniel Montgomery (Democratic-Republican) 18.3%; ▌Nathan Beach (Federalist) 8.6%; ▌Enoch Smith (Federalist) 8.6%
Pennsylvania 11	William Findley; Redistricted from the 8th district	Democratic-Republican	1802	Incumbent re-elected.	▌ ✓ William Findley (Democratic-Republican) 55.3%; ▌Thomas Pollock (Federalist) 44.7%
Pennsylvania 12	Aaron Lyle; Redistricted from the 10th district	Democratic-Republican	1808	Incumbent re-elected.	▌ ✓ Aaron Lyle (Democratic-Republican) 73.5%; ▌Joseph Pentecost (Federalist) 25.1%; ▌Thomas L. Burch (Democratic-Republican) 1.5%
Pennsylvania 13	John Smilie; Redistricted from the 9th district	Democratic-Republican	1792; 1794 (retired); 1798	Incumbent re-elected.	▌ ✓ John Smilie (Democratic-Republican) 60.4%; ▌Thomas Meason (Federalist) 39.6%
Pennsylvania 14	None (new district)			New seat. Democratic-Republican gain.	▌ ✓ Adamson Tannehill (Democratic-Republican) 48.0%; ▌John Woods (Federalist) 39.3%; ▌John Wilson (Democratic-Republican) 12.7%
Pennsylvania 15	Abner Lacock; Redistricted from the 11th district	Democratic-Republican	1810	Incumbent re-elected.	▌ ✓ Abner Lacock (Democratic-Republican) 62.8%; ▌Roger Alden (Federalist) 24.8%; ▌Robert Moore (Democratic-Republican) 12.4%

== Rhode Island ==
Rhode Island's apportionment was unchanged. Its elections were held August 25, 1812.

District	Incumbent			This race	
District	Member	Party	First elected	Results	Candidates
Rhode Island at-large 2 seats on a general ticket	Richard Jackson Jr.	Federalist	1808	Incumbent re-elected.	▌ ✓ Richard Jackson Jr. (Federalist) 29.3%; ▌ ✓ Elisha R. Potter (Federalist) 29.2%; ▌Jonathan Russell (Democratic-Republican) 20.8%; ▌Isaac Wilbour (Democratic-Republican) 20.7%
Rhode Island at-large 2 seats on a general ticket	Elisha R. Potter	Federalist	1808	Incumbent re-elected.	▌ ✓ Richard Jackson Jr. (Federalist) 29.3%; ▌ ✓ Elisha R. Potter (Federalist) 29.2%; ▌Jonathan Russell (Democratic-Republican) 20.8%; ▌Isaac Wilbour (Democratic-Republican) 20.7%

== South Carolina ==
South Carolina gained one representative as a result of the 1810 census, increasing from 8 seats to 9. Its elections were held October 12–13, 1812.

District	Incumbent			This race	
District	Member	Party	First elected	Results	Candidates
South Carolina 1 "Charleston district"	Langdon Cheves	Democratic- Republican	1810	Incumbent re-elected.	▌ ✓ Langdon Cheves (Democratic-Republican) 65.3%; ▌John Rutledge Jr. (Federalist) 34.7%
South Carolina 2 "Beaufort district"	William Lowndes; Redistricted from the 4th district	Democratic- Republican	1810	Incumbent re-elected.	▌ ✓ William Lowndes (Democratic-Republican) 84.5% (Note: Percent based on partial returns.); ▌Stephen Elliot (Federalist) 15.5%
South Carolina 3 "Georgetown district"	None (new district)			New seat. Democratic-Republican gain.	▌ ✓ Theodore Gourdin (Democratic-Republican) (Note: Vote totals unavailable, source states that Gourdin won by 174 votes.); ▌James Ervin (Democratic-Republican); ▌Benjamin Huger (Federalist)
South Carolina 4 "Orangeburgh district"	None (new district)			New seat. Democratic-Republican gain.	▌ ✓ John J. Chappell (Democratic-Republican) 63.1%; ▌Edmund Bacon (Democratic-Republican) 29.5%; ▌John Bynum (Democratic-Republican) 7.4%
South Carolina 5 "Newberry district"	None (new district)			New seat. Democratic-Republican gain.	▌ ✓ David R. Evans (Democratic-Republican); Uncontested
South Carolina 6 "Abbeville district"	John C. Calhoun	Democratic- Republican	1810	Incumbent re-elected.	▌ ✓ John C. Calhoun (Democratic-Republican); Uncontested
South Carolina 7 "Pendleton district"	Elias Earle; Redistricted from the 8th district	Democratic- Republican	1805 (special); 1806 (lost); 1810	Incumbent re-elected.	▌ ✓ Elias Earle (Democratic-Republican); ▌William Hunter (Democratic-Republican)
South Carolina 8 "Chester district"	Thomas Moore; Redistricted from the 7th district	Democratic- Republican	1800	Incumbent retired. Democratic-Republican hold.	▌ ✓ Samuel Farrow (Democratic-Republican); ▌James Duff (Federalist)
South Carolina 9 "Sumter district"	None (new district)			New seat. Democratic-Republican gain.	▌ ✓ John Kershaw (Democratic-Republican); ▌William Mayrant (Democratic-Republican); ▌Charles Richardson (Democratic-Republican)

== Tennessee ==
Tennessee's representation increased from 3 seats to 6 as a result of the 1810 census.

Its elections were held April 1–2, 1813, after the term began but before Congress's first meeting.

District	Incumbent			This race	
District	Member	Party	First elected	Results	Candidates
Tennessee 1	John Rhea	Democratic-Republican	1803	Incumbent re-elected.	▌ ✓ John Rhea (Democratic-Republican); Uncontested
Tennessee 2	John Sevier	Democratic-Republican	1790 (N.C.); 1790 (retired); 1811	Incumbent re-elected.	▌ ✓ John Sevier (Democratic-Republican); Uncontested
Tennessee 3	None (new district)			New seat. Democratic-Republican gain. The difference between the top two candidates was a single vote. William Kelly unsuccessfully contested the election.	▌ ✓ Thomas K. Harris (Democratic-Republican) 31.3%; ▌William Kelly (Unknown) 31.3%; ▌James Rogers (Unknown) 21.9%; ▌Bird Smith (Unknown) 11.9%; ▌James R. Rogers (Unknown) 3.5%
Tennessee 4	None (new district)			New seat. Democratic-Republican gain.	▌ ✓ John H. Bowen (Democratic-Republican)
Tennessee 5	Felix Grundy; Redistricted from the 3rd district	Democratic-Republican	1811	Incumbent re-elected.	▌ ✓ Felix Grundy (Democratic-Republican) 81.2%; ▌Newton Cannon (Democratic-Republican) 18.8%
Tennessee 6	None (new district)			New seat. Democratic-Republican gain.	▌ ✓ Parry W. Humphreys (Democratic-Republican); ▌James B. Reynolds (Democratic-Republican); ▌J. B. Wynn (Note: Source does not give full name.) (Unknown)

== Vermont ==
Vermont gained two seats after the 1810 census. Rather than re-district, however, Vermont replaced its districts with a single at-large district. It would continue to use an at-large district in 1814, 1816, and 1818, then one more time in 1822 (with 5 seats).

Its elections were held September 1, 1812.

District	Incumbent			This race	
District	Member	Party	First elected	Results	Candidates
Vermont at-large 6 seats on a general ticket	Samuel Shaw; Redistricted from the 1st district	Democratic- Republican	1808	Incumbent retired. Democratic-Republican hold.	▌ ✓ Richard Skinner (Democratic-Republican) 8.4%; ▌ ✓ Ezra Butler (Democratic-Republican) 8.4%; ▌ ✓ James Fisk (Democratic-Republican) 8.4%; ▌ ✓ Charles Rich (Democratic-Republican) 8.4%; ▌ ✓ William Strong (Democratic-Republican) 8.4%; ▌ ✓ William C. Bradley (Democratic-Republican) 8.4%; ▌Martin Chittenden (Federalist) 8.3%; ▌Chauncey Langdon (Federalist) 8.3%; ▌Daniel Chipman (Federalist) 8.3%; ▌William Chamberlain (Federalist) 8.3%; ▌John Noyes (Federalist) 8.3%; ▌Jonathan H. Hubbard (Federalist) 8.2%
Vermont at-large 6 seats on a general ticket	William Strong; Redistricted from the 2nd district	Democratic- Republican	1810	Incumbent re-elected.	
Vermont at-large 6 seats on a general ticket	James Fisk; Redistricted from the 3rd district	Democratic- Republican	1805; 1808 (lost); 1810	Incumbent re-elected.	
Vermont at-large 6 seats on a general ticket	Martin Chittenden; Redistricted from the 4th district	Federalist	1802	Incumbent lost re-election. Democratic-Republican hold	
Vermont at-large 6 seats on a general ticket	None (new seat)			New seat. Democratic-Republican gain.	
Vermont at-large 6 seats on a general ticket	None (new seat)			New seat. Democratic-Republican gain.	

== Virginia ==
Virginia gained one seat after the 1810 census, bringing its representation in the House of Representatives to 23 seats, the largest number Virginia would ever have. Virginia went from having the most representatives to having the second-most tied with Pennsylvania. New York, with its 27 seats, surpassed Virginia and remained the most populous state until the late 1960s.

Its elections were held in April 1813, after the term began but before Congress's first meeting.

District	Incumbent			This race	
District	Member	Party	First elected	Results	Candidates
Virginia 1	Thomas Wilson	Federalist	1811	Incumbent lost re-election. Democratic-Republican gain.	▌ ✓ John G. Jackson (Democratic-Republican) 60.2%; ▌Thomas Wilson (Federalist) 39.8%
Virginia 2	John Baker	Federalist	1811	Incumbent retired. Federalist hold.	▌ ✓ Francis White (Federalist) 100%
Virginia 3	John Smith	Democratic- Republican	1801	Incumbent re-elected.	▌ ✓ John Smith (Democratic-Republican) 82.8%; ▌Robert Page (Federalist) 17.2%
Virginia 4	William McCoy	Democratic- Republican	1811	Incumbent re-elected.	▌ ✓ William McCoy (Democratic-Republican) 57.1%; ▌Samuel Blackburn (Federalist) 42.9%
Virginia 5	James Breckinridge	Federalist	1809	Incumbent re-elected.	▌ ✓ James Breckinridge (Federalist) 53.5%; ▌Martin MacFerrand (Democratic-Republican) 46.5%
Virginia 6	Daniel Sheffey	Federalist	1809	Incumbent re-elected.	▌ ✓ Daniel Sheffey (Federalist) 74.3%; ▌Edward Campbell (Democratic-Republican) 25.7%
Virginia 7	None (new district)			New seat. Federalist gain.	▌ ✓ Hugh Caperton (Federalist) 53.8%; ▌Ballard Smith (Democratic-Republican) 46.2%
Virginia 8	Joseph Lewis Jr. Redistricted from the 7th district	Federalist	1803	Incumbent re-elected.	▌ ✓ Joseph Lewis Jr. (Federalist) 57.8%; ▌John Love (Democratic-Republican) 42.2%
Virginia 9	John Taliaferro; Redistricted from the 8th district	Democratic- Republican	1801; 1803 (retired); 1811	Incumbent lost re-election. Democratic-Republican hold. Incumbent later unsuccessfully challenged the results.	▌ ✓ John Hungerford (Democratic-Republican) 50.9%; ▌John Taliaferro (Democratic-Republican) 49.1%
Virginia 10	Aylett Hawes; Redistricted from the 9th district	Democratic- Republican	1811	Incumbent re-elected.	▌ ✓ Aylett Hawes (Democratic-Republican); ▌Philip R. Thompson (Democratic-Republican)
Virginia 11	John Dawson; Redistricted from the 10th district	Democratic- Republican	1797	Incumbent re-elected.	▌ ✓ John Dawson (Democratic-Republican); ▌Stapleton Crutchfield (Unknown)
Virginia 12	John Roane; Redistricted from the 11th district	Democratic- Republican	1809	Incumbent re-elected.	▌ ✓ John Roane (Democratic-Republican) 73.0%; ▌James Hunter (Federalist) 26.8%
Virginia 13	Burwell Bassett; Redistricted from the 12th district	Democratic- Republican	1805	Incumbent lost re-election. Federalist gain.	▌ ✓ Thomas M. Bayly (Federalist) 51.4%; ▌Burwell Bassett (Democratic-Republican) 48.6%
Virginia 14	William A. Burwell; Redistricted from the 13th district	Democratic- Republican	1806 (special)	Incumbent re-elected.	▌ ✓ William A. Burwell (Democratic-Republican) 100%
Virginia 15	Matthew Clay; Redistricted from the 14th district	Democratic- Republican	1797	Incumbent lost re-election. Democratic-Republican hold.	▌ ✓ John Kerr (Democratic-Republican) 46.4%; ▌Matthew Clay (Democratic-Republican) 34.0%; ▌William Rice (Federalist) 19.6%
Virginia 16	John Randolph; Redistricted from the 15th district	D-R Quid	1799	Incumbent lost re-election. Democratic-Republican gain.	▌ ✓ John W. Eppes (Democratic-Republican) 54.3%; ▌John Randolph (D-R Quid) 45.7%
Virginia 17	James Pleasants; Redistricted from the 16th district	Democratic- Republican	1811	Incumbent re-elected.	▌ ✓ James Pleasants (Democratic-Republican) 100%
Virginia 18	Thomas Gholson Jr. Redistricted from the 17th district	Democratic- Republican	1808 (special)	Incumbent re-elected.	▌ ✓ Thomas Gholson Jr. (Democratic-Republican) 100%
Virginia 19	Peterson Goodwyn; Redistricted from the 18th district	Democratic- Republican	1803	Incumbent re-elected.	▌ ✓ Peterson Goodwyn (Democratic-Republican) 100%
Virginia 20	Edwin Gray; Redistricted from the 19th district	D-R Quid	1799	Incumbent lost re-election. Democratic-Republican gain.	▌ ✓ James Johnson (Democratic-Republican) 67.3%; ▌Edwin Gray (D-R Quid) 32.7%
Virginia 21	Thomas Newton Jr. Redistricted from the 20th district	Democratic- Republican	1799	Incumbent re-elected.	▌ ✓ Thomas Newton Jr. (Democratic-Republican) 64.8%; ▌Swepson Whitehead (Federalist) 35.2%
Virginia 22	Hugh Nelson; Redistricted from the 21st district	Democratic- Republican	1811	Incumbent re-elected.	▌ ✓ Hugh Nelson (Democratic-Republican) 100%
Virginia 23	John Clopton; Redistricted from the 22nd district	Democratic- Republican	1801	Incumbent re-elected.	▌ ✓ John Clopton (Democratic-Republican) 63.2%; ▌Richard M. Morris (Federalist) 36.8%

== Non-voting delegates ==
Four territories had delegates in the 13th Congress: Illinois, Indiana, Mississippi, and Missouri. Illinois Territory and Missouri Territory elected their delegates in 1812 for both the end of the 12th and the start of the 13th Congresses.

District	Incumbent			This race	
District	Delegate	Party	First elected	Results	Candidates
Illinois Territory at-large	None (new district)			Illinois Territory had been created in 1809, but was not awarded a delegate until 1812. New delegate elected. Democratic-Republican gain. New delegate seated December 3, 1812.	▌ ✓ Shadrach Bond (Democratic-Republican)
Indiana Territory at-large	Jonathan Jennings	Democratic- Republican	1809	Incumbent re-elected.	▌ ✓ Jonathan Jennings (Democratic-Republican) 63.4%; ▌Waller Taylor (Democratic-Republican) 36.6%
Mississippi Territory at-large	George Poindexter	Democratic- Republican	1806	Incumbent retired. Democratic-Republican hold.	▌ ✓ William Lattimore (Democratic-Republican) 44.9%; ▌Cowles Mead (Democratic-Republican) 33.1%; ▌Thomas B. Reed (Democratic-Republican) 21.9%
Missouri Territory at-large	None (new district)			Missouri Territory was created in 1812 when Louisiana became a state. New delegate elected. Democratic-Republican gain. New delegate seated January 4, 1813.	▌ ✓ Edward Hempstead (Democratic-Republican) 40.8%; ▌Samuel Hammond (Democratic-Republican) 35.3%; ▌Rufus Easton (Democratic-Republican) 23.3%; ▌Matthew Lyon (Democratic-Republican) 0.7%

== See also ==
- 1812 United States elections
  - List of United States House of Representatives elections (1789–1822)
  - 1812 United States presidential election
  - 1812–13 United States Senate elections
- 12th United States Congress
- 13th United States Congress

== Bibliography ==
- "A New Nation Votes: American Election Returns 1787–1825". Tufts Digital Library, Tufts University. Archived from the original on January 29, 2015.
- Dubin, Michael J. (March 1, 1998). 1788–1997 United States Congressional Elections: The Official Results of the Elections of the 1st Through 105th Congresses. McFarland and Company. ISBN 978-0786402830.
- Martis, Kenneth C. (January 1, 1989). The Historical Atlas of Political Parties in the United States Congress, 1789–1989. Macmillan Publishing Company. ISBN 978-0029201701.
- "Party Divisions of the House of Representatives* 1789–Present". Office of the Historian, United States House of Representatives.
- Mapping Early American Elections project team (2019). "Mapping Early American Elections". Roy Rosenzweig Center for History and New Media, George Mason University.
