= List of elections in 1813 =

The following elections occurred in the year 1813.

== Europe ==
- 1813 Spanish general election

== North America ==
=== United States ===
==== United States lieutenant gubernatorial ====
- 1813 Connecticut lieutenant gubernatorial election

==== United States gubernatorial ====
- 1813 Connecticut gubernatorial election
- 1813 Delaware gubernatorial election
- 1813 Georgia gubernatorial election
- 1813 Maryland gubernatorial election
- 1813 Massachusetts gubernatorial election
- 1813 New Hampshire gubernatorial election
- 1813 New Jersey gubernatorial election
- 1813 New York gubernatorial election
- 1813 North Carolina gubernatorial election
- 1813 Rhode Island gubernatorial election
- 1813 Tennessee gubernatorial election
- 1813 Vermont gubernatorial election
- 1813 Virginia gubernatorial election

==== United States Senate ====
- 1812 and 1813 United States Senate elections
- United States Senate election in New York, 1813

==== United States House of Representatives ====
- 1812 and 1813 United States Senate elections
- 1813 Connecticut's at-large congressional district special election
- 1813 Georgia's at-large congressional district special election
- 1813 Maryland's 3rd congressional district special election
- 1813 Massachusetts's 18th congressional district special election
- 1813 New York's 6th congressional district special election
- 1813 New York's 15th congressional district special election
- 1813 North Carolina's 3rd congressional district special election
- 1813 Ohio's 6th congressional district special election
- 1813 Pennsylvania's 3rd congressional district special election
- 1813 Pennsylvania's 5th congressional district special election
- 1813 Pennsylvania's 13th congressional district special election
- 1813 Pennsylvania's 15th congressional district special election
- 1813 United States House of Representatives elections in Rhode Island
- 1813 United States House of Representatives elections in Tennessee
- 1813 United States House of Representatives elections in Virginia
- 1813 Virginia's 23rd congressional district special election

== See also ==
- Category:1813 elections
