= 1813 Pennsylvania's 15th congressional district special election =

A special election was held in Pennsylvania's 15th congressional district to fill a vacancy left by the resignation of Abner Lacock (DR) before the 13th Congress assembled.

== Electoral results ==
| Candidate | Party | Votes | Percent |
|---|---|---|---|
| Thomas Wilson | Democratic-Republican | 690 | 78.9% |
| Robert Morse | Unknown | 80 | 9.1% |
| Patrick Farrelly | Democratic-Republican | 70 | 8.0% |
| Others | | 35 | 4.0% |

== See also ==
- List of special elections to the United States House of Representatives
