= 1813 Virginia gubernatorial election =

- December 11, 1813
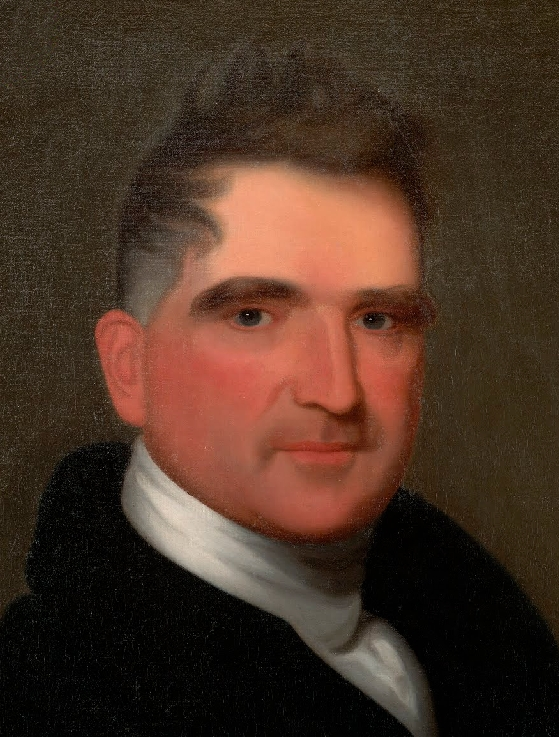

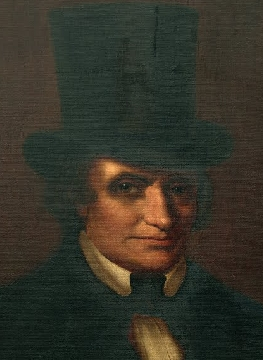
Nominee	James Barbour	James Pleasants
1st ballot	133	53
Governor before election
James Barbour
Democratic-Republican
Elected Governor
James Barbour
Democratic-Republican (Note: Lampi lists no parties for this election, while Lowery states Barbour was supported by "friends." Both Kallenbach and Kallenbach and Sobel and Raimo list Barbour as a Democratic-Republican during his tenure.)

A gubernatorial election was held in Virginia on December 11, 1813. The incumbent governor of Virginia James Barbour defeated the U.S. representative from Virginia's 17th congressional district James Pleasants.

Barbour's tenure coincided with the War of 1812. He had offended some officers in the Virginia militia by placing their junior colleague, brigadier general Robert B. Taylor, in command of the militia at Norfolk, Virginia, and his administration of the state's wartime finances drew criticism from tertium quids and those opposed to the war. These forces combined in an attempt to defeat Barbour for re-election in 1813. The opposition first approached brigadier general Francis Preston, who declined to challenge Barbour, before finally settling on Pleasants.

The election was conducted by the Virginia General Assembly in joint session. Barbour was elected with a majority on the first ballot.

== General election ==
1813 Virginia gubernatorial election
Candidate	First ballot	
Candidate	Count	Percent
James Barbour (incumbent)	133	70.75
James Pleasants	53	28.19
Others	2	1.06
Total	188	100.00

== Bibliography ==
- Kallenbach, Joseph E.; Kallenbach, Jessamine S. (1977). American State Governors, 1776–1976. Vol. 1. Dobbs Ferry, NY: Oceana Publications.
- Lampi, Philip J. (2012). "Virginia 1813 Governor". A New Nation Votes. American Antiquarian Society.
- Lowery, Charles D. (1984). James Barbour: A Jeffersonian Republican. University, AL: University of Alabama Press.
- Sobel, Robert; Raimo, John (1978). Biographical Directory of the Governors of the United States 1789–1978. Vol. 4. Westport, CT: Meckler Books.
