= 1805 Pennsylvania's 4th congressional district special election =

A special election was held in Pennsylvania's 4th congressional district on October 8, 1805, to fill a vacancy left by the death of John A. Hanna (DR) on July 23, 1805, before the first session of the 9th Congress.

== Election results ==
Candidate	Party	Votes	Percent
Robert Whitehill	Democratic-Republican	6,457	70.7%
James Duncan	Independent Republican	2,674	29.3%

Whitehall took his seat December 2, 1805

== See also ==
- List of special elections to the United States House of Representatives
