= 1813 New York's 2nd congressional district special election =

On August 2, 1813, at the end of the 1st session of the 13th Congress, Egbert Benson (F) of New York's 2nd district resigned. A special election was held for his replacement December 28–30, 1813.

== Election results ==
| Candidate | Party | Votes | Percent |
|---|---|---|---|
| William Irving | Democratic-Republican | 3,895 | 52.5% |
| Peter A. Jay | Federalist | 3,518 | 47.5% |

Irving took his seat on January 22, 1814.

== See also ==
- List of special elections to the United States House of Representatives
