= Thomas Wilson (Pennsylvania politician) =

American politician

Thomas Wilson (1772 – October 4, 1824) was a member of the U.S. House of Representatives from Pennsylvania.

Thomas Wilson was born near Sunbury, Pennsylvania. He had the contract for supplying the western forts of the United States from Niagara to New Orleans. He was engaged in shipbuilding in Erie, Pennsylvania, in 1805 and built vessels for commerce on the Great Lakes. He was burgess of Erie in 1807, town clerk in 1808, treasurer of Erie County from 1809 to 1812, and county commissioner in 1811. He was also a justice of the peace.

Wilson was elected as a Republican to the Thirteenth Congress to fill the vacancy caused when the representative-elect Abner Lacock resigned before taking his seat. He was reelected to the Fourteenth Congress. He was a member of the Pennsylvania House of Representatives from 1817 to 1820. He was prothonotary and clerk of court of Erie County from 1819 to 1824. He died in Erie in 1824.

== Sources ==
- United States Congress. "Thomas Wilson (id: W000616)". Biographical Directory of the United States Congress.
- The Political Graveyard

U.S. House of Representatives
Preceded by District Created	Member of the U.S. House of Representatives from Pennsylvania's 15th congressional district 1813–1817	Succeeded by Robert Moore
