= 1813 Massachusetts gubernatorial election =

- April 5, 1813
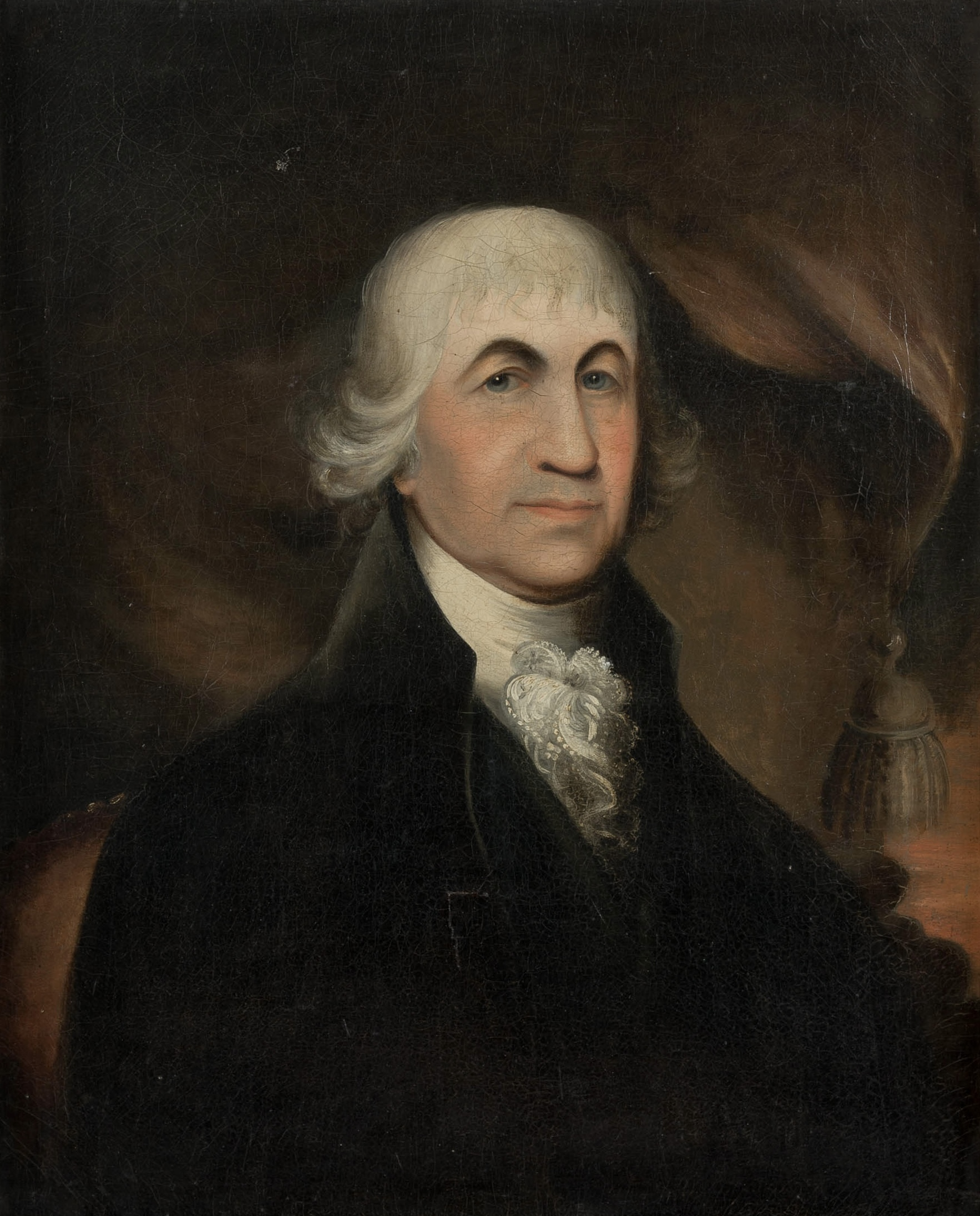

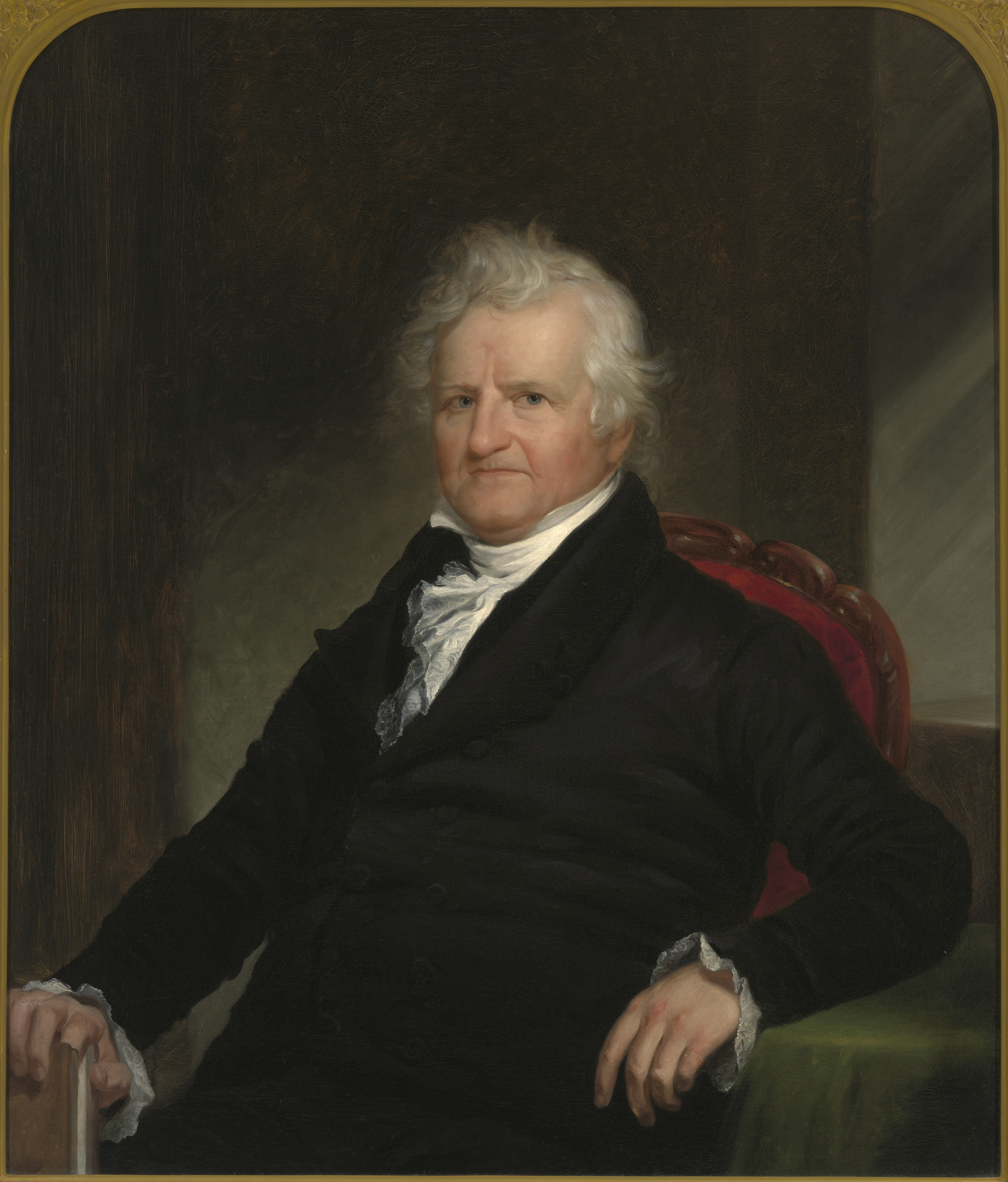
Nominee	Caleb Strong	Joseph Bradley Varnum
Party	Federalist	Democratic-Republican
Popular vote	56,754	42,789
Percentage	56.89%	42.90%
- County results Strong: 50–60% 60–70% 70–80% 80–90% Varnum: 50–60%
Governor before election
Caleb Strong
Federalist
Elected Governor
Caleb Strong
Federalist

The 1813 Massachusetts gubernatorial election was held on April 5, 1813, in order to elect the Governor of Massachusetts. Incumbent Federalist Governor Caleb Strong won re-election against Democratic-Republican candidate and incumbent United States Senator from Massachusetts Joseph Bradley Varnum.

== General election ==
On election day, April 5, 1813, incumbent Federalist Governor Caleb Strong won re-election by a margin of 12,480 votes against his opponent Democratic-Republican candidate Joseph Bradley Varnum, thereby retaining Federalist control over the office of governor. Strong was sworn in for his ninth overall term on May 30, 1813.

=== Results ===
Massachusetts gubernatorial election, 1813
Party	Candidate	Votes	%
Federalist	Caleb Strong (incumbent)	56,754	56.89%
Democratic-Republican	Joseph Bradley Varnum	42,789	42.90%
	Scattering	211	0.21%
Total votes		99,754	100.00%
Federalist hold			
