= Robert Moore (Pennsylvania politician) =

American politician (1778–1831)

Robert Moore (March 30, 1778 – January 14, 1831) was a member of the U.S. House of Representatives from Pennsylvania.

Moore was born on a farm near Washington, Pennsylvania. He attended Washington (now Washington & Jefferson) College in Washington, Pennsylvania. He studied law, was admitted to the bar in 1802 and commenced practice in Beaver, Pennsylvania. He served as treasurer of Beaver County, Pennsylvania from 1805 to 1811. He served in the Pennsylvania State Militia in the War of 1812.

Moore was elected as a Republican to the Fifteenth and Sixteenth Congresses. He was not a candidate for renomination. He was elected a member of the American Antiquarian Society in 1820. He resumed the practice of law and was a member of the Pennsylvania House of Representatives in 1830 and 1831. He died in Beaver in 1831 and was interred in Beaver Cemetery located within the town of Beaver.

A grandson, Michael D. Harter, was a two-term U.S. Representative from Ohio.

== Sources ==
- United States Congress. "Robert Moore (id: M000913)". Biographical Directory of the United States Congress.
- The Political Graveyard

U.S. House of Representatives
Preceded by Thomas Wilson	Member of the U.S. House of Representatives from Pennsylvania's 15th congressional district 1817–1821	Succeeded by Patrick Farrelly
