= 1810 United States House of Representatives elections in New York =

1810 United States representatives elections in New york

United States House of Representatives elections in New York of 1810
- April 24–26, 1810

All 17 New York seats to the United States House of Representatives
	Majority party	Minority party
Party	Democratic-Republican	Federalist
Last election	9	8
Seats won	12	5
Seat change	▲3	▼3
Popular vote	74,215	62,152
Percentage	54.4%	45.6%

The 1810 United States House of Representatives elections in New York were held from April 24 to 26, 1810, to elect 17 U.S. Representatives to represent the State of New York in the United States House of Representatives of the 12th United States Congress. At the same time, a vacancy was filled in the 11th United States Congress.

== Background ==
17 U.S. Representatives had been elected in April 1808 to a term in the 11th United States Congress beginning on March 4, 1809. William Denning never took his seat, and eventually resigned, leaving a vacancy in the 2nd District. The other 16 representatives' term would end on March 3, 1811. The congressional elections were held together with the State elections in late April 1810, about ten months before the term would start on March 4, 1811, and about a year and a half before Congress actually met on November 4, 1811.

== Congressional districts ==
After the U.S. census of 1800, New York's representation in the House was increased to 17 seats. On March 30, 1802, the New York State Legislature had re-apportioned the congressional districts, dividing New York County seemingly at random into two districts. After the election of one Democratic-Republican and one Federalist in 1802, the Dem.-Rep. majority in the State Legislature gerrymandered the two districts together in an Act passed on March 20, 1804, so that two congressmen would be elected on a general ticket by the voters of both districts, assuring the election of two Democratic-Republicans. On April 8, 1808, the State Legislature re-apportioned the districts again, separating the 2nd and the 3rd District, and creating two districts with two seats each to be filled on a general ticket: the 2nd and the 6th.

Due to the double-seat districts, there were then only 15 districts; the 16th and 17th were eliminated.

The districts remained the same as at the previous elections in 1808. Only four new counties were created inside some districts: in the 5th D., Sullivan Co. was split from Ulster Co.; in the 7th D., Schenectady Co. was split from Albany Co.; in the 8th D., Franklin Co. was split from Clinton Co.; and in the 15th D., Niagara Co. was split from Genesee Co.

- The 1st District comprising Kings, Queens and Suffolk counties.
- The 2nd District (two seats) comprising New York, Richmond and Rockland counties.
- The 3rd District comprising Orange and Westchester counties.
- The 4th District comprising Dutchess County.
- The 5th District comprising Ulster, Greene and Sullivan counties.
- The 6th District (two seats) comprising Columbia, Rensselaer and Washington counties.
- The 7th District comprising Albany and Schenectady counties.
- The 8th District comprising Clinton, Saratoga, Essex and Franklin counties.
- The 9th District comprising Montgomery and Schoharie counties.
- The 10th District comprising Herkimer, St. Lawrence, Jefferson and Lewis counties.
- The 11th District comprising Oneida and Madison counties.
- The 12th District comprising Delaware and Otsego counties.
- The 13th District comprising Chenango, Onondaga, Broome and Cortland counties.
- The 14th District comprising Tioga, Steuben, Cayuga and Seneca counties.
- The 15th District comprising Ontario, Genesee, Allegany and Niagara counties.

Note: There are now 62 counties in the State of New York. The counties which are not mentioned in this list had not yet been established, or sufficiently organized, the area being included in one or more of the abovementioned counties.

== Result ==
12 Democratic-Republicans and 5 Federalists were elected to the 12th Congress, and one Democratic-Republican to fill the vacancy in the 11th Congress. The incumbents Sage, Emott, Livingston, Sammons, Gold, Tracy and Porter were re-elected. Mitchill was elected to fill the vacancy, and to succeed himself in the next Congress.

1810 United States House election result
District	Democratic-Republican		Federalist	
1	Ebenezer Sage	3,362	David Gardiner	235
2	Samuel L. Mitchill	6,203	John B. Coles	5,621
2	William Paulding, Jr.	6,175	Peter A. Jay	5,597
3	Pierre Van Cortlandt, Jr.	3,944	John Bradner	2,226
4	Daniel C. Verplanck	2,994	James Emott	3,125
5	Thomas B. Cooke	3,057	Gerrit Abeel	2,813
6	Roger Skinner	7,033	Robert Le Roy Livingston	7,367
6	James L. Hogeboom	7,033	Asa Fitch	7,366
7	John V. Veeder	2,324	Harmanus Bleecker	3,163
8	Benjamin Pond	3,560	James McCrea	2,623
9	Thomas Sammons	3,628	Richard Van Horne	3,266
10	Silas Stow	3,571	Simeon Ford	3,387
11	Thomas Skinner	3,675	Thomas R. Gold	4,079
12	Arunah Metcalf	3,975	John M. Bowers	3,094
13	Uri Tracy	4,357	Nathaniel Waldron	2,884
14	Daniel Avery	4,570	John Harris	1,975
15	Peter B. Porter	4,804	Ebenezer F. Norton	3,331
2 Special	Samuel L. Mitchill		John B. Coles	

Note: The Anti-Federalists called themselves "Republicans." However, at the same time, the Federalists called them "Democrats" which was meant to be pejorative. After some time both terms got more and more confused, and sometimes used together as "Democratic Republicans" which later historians have adopted (with a hyphen) to describe the party from the beginning, to avoid confusion with both the later established and still existing Democratic and Republican parties.

== Aftermath and special election ==
Samuel L. Mitchill took his seat in the 11th United States Congress on December 4, 1810.

The House of Representatives of the 12th United States Congress met for the first time at the United States Capitol in Washington, D.C., on November 4, 1811, and 16 representatives took their seats on this day. Only Paulding arrived later, and took his seat on November 28, 1811.

Robert Le Roy Livingston resigned his seat on May 6, 1812. A special election to fill the vacancy was held in the former 6th district (the districts had been re-apportioned in the meanwhile) at the next congressional election in December 1812, and was won by Thomas P. Grosvenor, of the same party. Grosvenor took his seat on January 29, 1813.

== Sources ==
- The New York Civil List compiled in 1858 (see: pg. 66 for district apportionment; pg. 69 for Congressmen)
- Members of the Twelfth United States Congress
- Election result 1st D. at project "A New Nation Votes", compiled by Phil Lampi, hosted by Tufts University Digital Library
- Election result 2nd D. at "A New Nation Votes"
- Election result 3rd D. at "A New Nation Votes"
- Election result 4th D. at "A New Nation Votes"
- Election result 5th D. at "A New Nation Votes"
- Election result 6th D. at "A New Nation Votes"
- Election result 7th D. at "A New Nation Votes"
- Election result 8th D. at "A New Nation Votes"
- Election result 9th D. at "A New Nation Votes"
- Election result 10th D. at "A New Nation Votes"
- Election result 11th D. at "A New Nation Votes"
- Election result 12th D. at "A New Nation Votes"
- Election result 13th D. at "A New Nation Votes"
- Election result 14th D. at "A New Nation Votes"
- Election result 15th D. at "A New Nation Votes"
- Special election result 2nd D. at "A New Nation Votes" [lists only returns from Richmond and Rockland counties]
