= 1813 North Carolina's 3rd congressional district special election =

A special election was held in North Carolina's 3rd congressional district on January 11, 1813, to fill a vacancy left by the death of Thomas Blount (DR) on February 7, 1812.

== Election results ==
Candidate	Party	Votes	Percent
William Kennedy	Federalist	1,144	69.5%
James West Clark	Democratic-Republican	502	30.5%

Kennedy took his seat on January 30, 1813.

== See also ==
- List of special elections to the United States House of Representatives
