= Abner Lacock =

American politician (1770–1837)

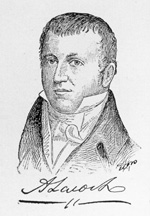

United States Senator from Pennsylvania
- In office March 4, 1813 – March 4, 1819
- Preceded by: Andrew Gregg
- Succeeded by: Walter Lowrie

Member of the U.S. House of Representatives from Pennsylvania's 11th district
- In office March 4, 1811 – March 3, 1813
- Preceded by: Samuel Smith
- Succeeded by: William Findley

Member of the Pennsylvania Senate
- In office 1808-1810

Member of the Pennsylvania State Legislature
- In office 1801-1803; 1804-1808; 1832-1835

Personal details
- Born: July 9, 1770 Alexandria, Virginia Colony, British America
- Died: April 12, 1837 (aged 66) Freedom, Pennsylvania, U.S.
- Party: Democratic-Republican

Abner Lacock (July 9, 1770 – April 12, 1837) was an American politician from Rochester, Pennsylvania. He served in both houses in the state legislature and represented Pennsylvania in both the U.S. House and Senate.

== Biography ==
Abner Lacock was born on July 7, 1770, near Alexandria in the Colony of Virginia. He moved with his parents to Washington County, Pennsylvania, as a youth. In 1796 he moved to Beaver, Pennsylvania. He was a justice of the peace in 1796. He also worked as an innkeeper. He served in the Pennsylvania State Legislature from 1801 to 1803. He was an associate judge of the Beaver County Court from 1803 to 1804. He served again in the State legislature from 1804 to 1808. He was member of the Pennsylvania Militia and served as brigadier general in 1807. He was a member of the Pennsylvania State Senate from 1808 to 1810.

Lacock was elected as a Democratic Republican to the Twelfth Congress. He was re-elected to the Thirteenth Congress but resigned before it commenced, having been elected Senator. He was elected to the United States Senate as a Democratic Republican in 1812. He served as chairman of the United States Senate Committee on Pensions during the Fifteenth Congress. After he left Congress, he was appointed a State commissioner to survey routes for canals and railways in Pennsylvania in 1825. He again served in the State legislature from 1832 to 1835. He was appointed to survey and construct the Pennsylvania & Ohio Canal in 1836. He died near Freedom, Pennsylvania, in 1837. Interment in Lacock Cemetery in Rochester, Pennsylvania.

Abner was frequently referred to as General Lacock after he served as a brigadier general in the state militia.

U.S. House of Representatives
Preceded by Samuel Smith	Member of the U.S. House of Representatives from Pennsylvania's 11th congressional district 1811–1813	Succeeded by William Findley
U.S. Senate
Preceded by Andrew Gregg	U.S. senator (Class 3) from Pennsylvania; 1813–1819; Served alongside: Michael Leib, Jonathan Roberts	Succeeded by Walter Lowrie
