= 1808–09 United States House of Representatives elections =

House elections for the 11th U.S. Congress

- April 26, 1808 – May 5, 1809

All 142 seats in the United States House of Representatives 72 seats needed for a majority
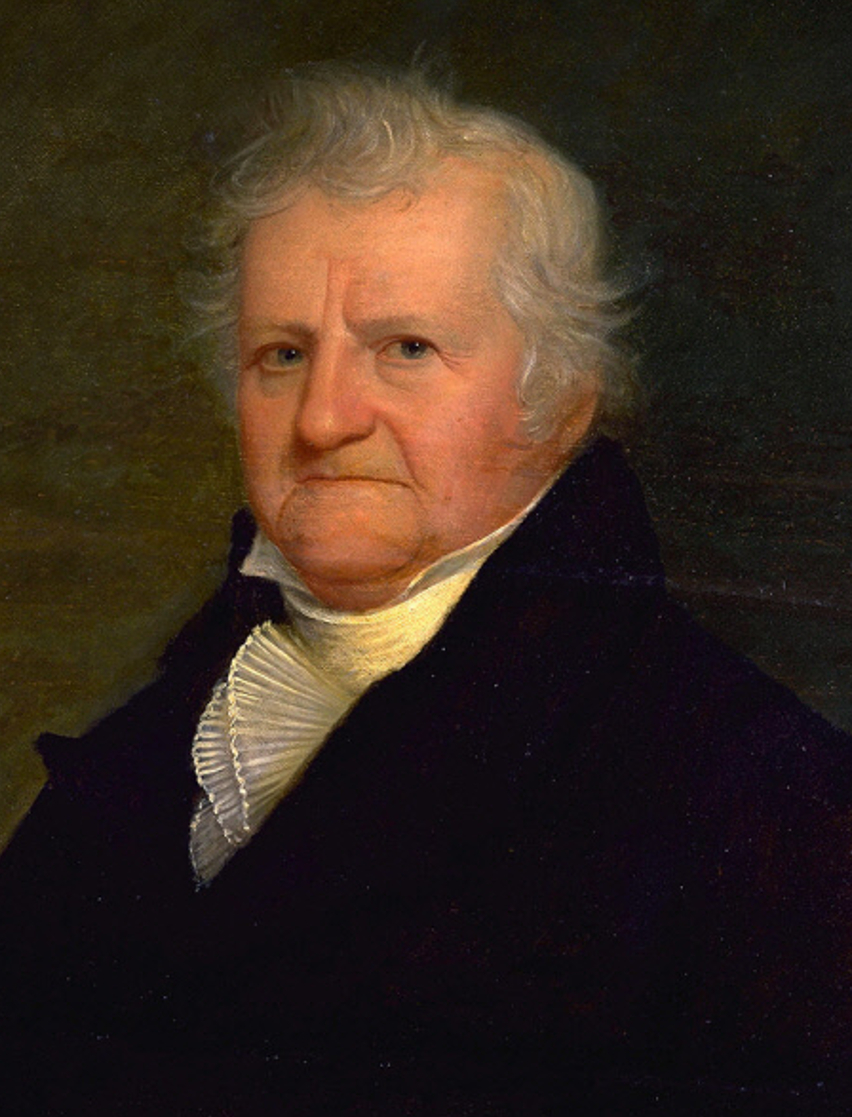

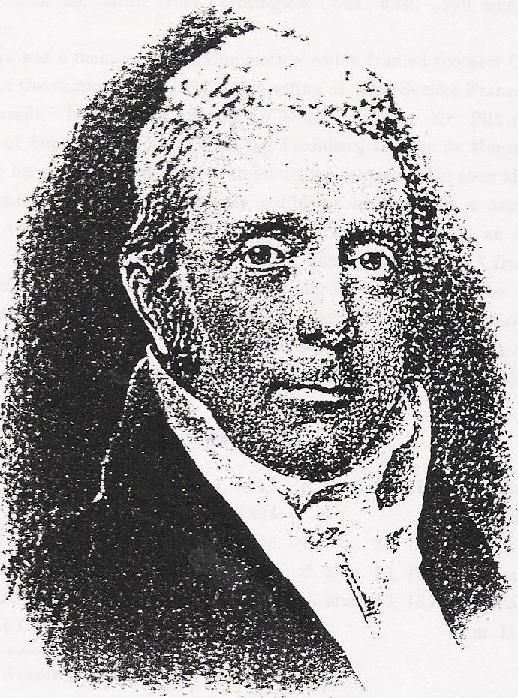
	Majority party	Minority party
Leader	Joseph Bradley Varnum	Timothy Pitkin
Party	Democratic-Republican	Federalist
Leader's seat	Massachusetts 4th	Connecticut at-large
Last election	116 seats	26 seats
Seats won	94 (Note: Figures here match Dubin (p. 42, which includes "87 Republicans, 1 Independent Republican, and 6 Quids", in addition to "48 Federalists"), but are different than those given by Martis (p. 80), and "Party Divisions of the House of Representatives* 1789–Present". Office of the Historian, House of United States House of Representatives., which both report 92 Democratic-Republicans, and 50 Federalists.)	48
Seat change	▼22	▲22
- Results: Federalist hold Federalist gain Democratic-Republican hold Democratic-Republican gain Dissident Republican hold Dissident Republican Gain; Undistricted
Speaker before election
Joseph Bradley Varnum
Democratic-Republican
Elected Speaker
Joseph Bradley Varnum
Democratic-Republican

The 1808–09 United States House of Representatives elections were held on various dates in various states between April 26, 1808, and May 5, 1809. Each state set its own date for its elections to the House of Representatives before the first session of the 11th United States Congress convened on May 22, 1809. They coincided with James Madison being elected as president. Elections were held for all 142 seats, representing 17 states.

Despite Madison's victory, voters in districts whose economies were driven by shipping or manufacturing rather than agriculture shifted to the Federalist Party. The reasons for this shift were the unpopularity of the Embargo Act of 1807 and fears that Democratic-Republican Party policies could trigger a naval war with the First French Empire or Britain. The politically dominant Democratic-Republicans won their smallest majority since the pivotal, realigning election of 1800.

== Election summaries ==
↓
94	48
Democratic-Republican	Federalist

State	Type	Date	Total seats	Democratic- Republican		Federalist	
State	Type	Date	Total seats	Seats	Change	Seats	Change
New York	Districts	April 26–28, 1808	17	9	▼6	8	▲6
Kentucky	Districts	August 1, 1808	6	6	Steady	0	Steady
North Carolina	Districts	August 12, 1808	12	9	▼2	3	▲2
New Hampshire	At-large	August 29, 1808	5	0	▼5	5	▲5
Rhode Island	At-large	August 30, 1808	2	0	▼2	2	▲2
Vermont	Districts	September 6, 1808 (Note: Majority required for election which was not met in two districts, necessitating a second election, held on December 13, 1808.)	4	1	▼1	3	▲1
Connecticut	At-large	September 19, 1808	7	0	Steady	7	Steady
Georgia	At-large	October 3, 1808	4	4	Steady	0	Steady
Maryland	Districts	October 3, 1808	9	6	Steady	3	Steady
Delaware	At-large	October 4, 1808	1	0	Steady	1	Steady
South Carolina	Districts	October 10–11, 1808	8	8	Steady	0	Steady
Ohio	At-large	October 11, 1808	1	1	Steady	0	Steady
Pennsylvania	Districts	October 11, 1808	18	16	▲1	2	▼1
Massachusetts	Districts	November 7, 1808	17	8	▼3	9	▲3
New Jersey	At-large	November 7–8, 1808	6	6	Steady	0	Steady
Late elections (after the March 4, 1809, beginning of the next Congress)
Virginia	Districts	April 1809	22	17	▼4	5	▲4
Tennessee	Districts	May 4–5, 1809	3	3	Steady	0	Steady
Total			142	94 66.2%	▼23	48 33.8%	▲23

House seats
Dem-Republican	66.20%
Federalist	33.80%

== Special elections ==
There were special elections in 1808 and 1809 during the 10th United States Congress and 11th United States Congress.

Elections are sorted here by date then district.

=== 10th Congress ===
District	Incumbent			This race	
District	Member / Delegate	Party	First elected	Results	Candidates
North Carolina 7	John Culpepper	Federalist	1806	Seat declared vacant January 2, 1808, due to a contest on account of alleged irregularities. Incumbent re-elected February 1, 1808 and re-seated February 23, 1808. Incumbent later lost re-election; see below.	▌ ✓ John Culpepper (Federalist) 56.5%; ▌Duncan McFarlan (Democratic-Republican) 42.7%
New Jersey at-large	Ezra Darby	Democratic- Republican	1804	Incumbent died January 27, 1808. New member elected March 8–9, 1808 and seated April 1, 1808. Democratic-Republican hold. Winner later elected to the next term; see below.	▌ ✓ Adam Boyd (Democratic-Republican) 82.3%; ▌Aaron Ogden (Federalist) 9.7%; ▌Ebenezer Elmer (Democratic-Republican) 4.0%; Others 3.9%
New York 12	David Thomas	Democratic- Republican	1800	Incumbent resigned February 5, 1808, to become New York State Treasurer. New member elected April 26–28, 1808 and seated November 7, 1808. Democratic-Republican hold. Winner also lost election to the next term in the redistricted 6th district; see below.	▌ ✓ Nathan Wilson (Democratic-Republican) 57.4%; ▌Asa Fitch (Federalist) 42.6%; Others <0.1%
Massachusetts 2 "Essex South district"	Jacob Crowninshield	Democratic- Republican	1802	Incumbent died April 15, 1808. New member elected May 4, 1808 and seated December 20, 1808. Democratic-Republican hold. Winner later retired instead of running for the next term; see below.	▌ ✓ Joseph Story (Democratic-Republican) 98.3%; Others 1.7%
Rhode Island at-large	Nehemiah Knight	Democratic- Republican	1802	Incumbent died June 13, 1808. New member elected August 30, 1808 and seated November 11, 1808. Federalist gain. Winner also elected to the next term; see below.	▌ ✓ Richard Jackson Jr. (Federalist) 63.4%; ▌Jonathan Russell (Democratic-Republican) 36.6%
Vermont 1 "Southwestern district"	James Witherell	Democratic- Republican	1806	Incumbent resigned May 1, 1808, to become judge of the Supreme Court of Michigan Territory. New member elected September 6, 1808 and seated November 8, 1808. Democratic-Republican hold. Winner also elected to the next term; see below.	▌ ✓ Samuel Shaw (Democratic-Republican) 56.7%; ▌Nathan Robinson (Federalist) 20.7%; ▌Chauncey Langdon (Federalist) 19.0%; ▌Jonas Galusha (Democratic-Republican) 2.4%; Others 1.1%
Virginia 17	John Claiborne	Democratic- Republican	1805	Incumbent died October 9, 1808. New member elected September 8, 1808 and seated November 7, 1808. Democratic-Republican hold. Winner later elected to the next term; see below.	▌ ✓ Thomas Gholson Jr. (Democratic-Republican); Uncontested
Indiana Territory at-large	Benjamin Parke	Federalist	1805	Incumbent resigned March 1, 1808. New delegate elected October 22, 1808. Democratic-Republican gain.	▌ ✓ Jesse B. Thomas (Democratic-Republican) 60%; ▌Michael Jones (Unknown) 30%; ▌Shadrach Bond (Unknown) 10% (Note: Bond was not considered as a candidate.)
Pennsylvania 1	Joseph Clay	Democratic- Republican	1802	Incumbent resigned March 28, 1808. New member elected October 11, 1808 and seated November 16, 1808. Democratic-Republican hold. Winner also elected to the next term; see below.	▌ ✓ Benjamin Say (Democratic-Republican) 55.7%; ▌Charles W. Hare (Federalist) 44.3%

=== 11th Congress ===
District	Incumbent			This race	
District	Member	Party	First elected	Results	Candidates
Pennsylvania 1	Benjamin Say	Democratic- Republican	1808 (special)	Incumbent resigned June 1809. New member elected October 10, 1809 and seated November 27, 1809. Democratic-Republican hold.	▌ ✓ Adam Seybert (Democratic-Republican) 59.5%; ▌Richard R. Smith (Federalist) 40.5%
Virginia 21	Wilson C. Nicholas	Democratic- Republican	1807	Incumbent resigned November 27, 1809. New member elected December 1809 and seated January 17, 1810. Democratic-Republican hold.	▌ ✓ David S. Garland (Democratic-Republican); ▌Thomas M. Randolph (Federalist) (Note: Numbers of votes missing or incomplete in source(s).)

== Connecticut ==
District	Incumbent			This race	
District	Member	Party	First elected	Results	Candidates
Connecticut at-large (7 seats)	Epaphroditus Champion	Federalist	1806	Incumbent re-elected.	Elected on a general ticket: ▌ ✓ Epaphroditus Champion (Federalist); ▌ ✓ Samuel W. Dana (Federalist); ▌ ✓ John Davenport (Federalist); ▌ ✓ Jonathan O. Moseley (Federalist); ▌ ✓ Timothy Pitkin (Federalist); ▌ ✓ Lewis B. Sturges (Federalist); ▌ ✓ Benjamin Tallmadge (Federalist); ▌Sylvanus Backus (Federalist); ▌Asa Bacon (Federalist); ▌John Caldwell (Federalist); ▌Sylvester Gilbert (Federalist); ▌Uriel Holmes (Federalist); ▌Ebenezer Huntington (Federalist); ▌Lyman Law (Federalist); ▌Samuel B. Sherwood (Federalist); ▌Nathan Smith (Federalist); ▌Nathaniel Terry (Federalist); ▌Noah Webster (Federalist)
Connecticut at-large (7 seats)	Samuel W. Dana	Federalist	1796 (special)	Incumbent re-elected.	
Connecticut at-large (7 seats)	John Davenport	Federalist	1798	Incumbent re-elected.	
Connecticut at-large (7 seats)	Jonathan O. Moseley	Federalist	1804	Incumbent re-elected.	
Connecticut at-large (7 seats)	Timothy Pitkin	Federalist	1805 (special)	Incumbent re-elected.	
Connecticut at-large (7 seats)	Lewis B. Sturges	Federalist	1805 (special)	Incumbent re-elected.	
Connecticut at-large (7 seats)	Benjamin Tallmadge	Federalist	1801 (special)	Incumbent re-elected.	

== Delaware ==
District	Incumbent			This race	
District	Member	Party	First elected	Results	Candidates
Delaware at-large	Nicholas Van Dyke	Federalist	1807 (special)	Incumbent retired. Federalist hold.	▌ ✓ Nicholas Van Dyke (Federalist) 53.3%; ▌Joseph Haslet (Democratic-Republican) 46.7%

== Georgia ==
District	Incumbent			This race	
District	Member	Party	First elected	Results	Candidates
Georgia at-large (4 seats)	William W. Bibb	Democratic-Republican	1806	Incumbent re-elected.	Elected on a general ticket: ▌ ✓ William W. Bibb (Democratic-Republican) 22.7%; ▌ ✓ George Troup (Democratic-Republican) 22.2%; ▌ ✓ Howell Cobb (Democratic-Republican) 20.6%; ▌ ✓ Dennis Smelt (Democratic-Republican) 14.8%; ▌James E. Houston (Democratic-Republican) 11.1%; ▌John M. Dooley (Democratic-Republican) 8.6%
Georgia at-large (4 seats)	George M. Troup	Democratic-Republican	1806	Incumbent re-elected.	Elected on a general ticket: ▌ ✓ William W. Bibb (Democratic-Republican) 22.7%; ▌ ✓ George Troup (Democratic-Republican) 22.2%; ▌ ✓ Howell Cobb (Democratic-Republican) 20.6%; ▌ ✓ Dennis Smelt (Democratic-Republican) 14.8%; ▌James E. Houston (Democratic-Republican) 11.1%; ▌John M. Dooley (Democratic-Republican) 8.6%
Georgia at-large (4 seats)	Howell Cobb	Democratic-Republican	1806	Incumbent re-elected.	Elected on a general ticket: ▌ ✓ William W. Bibb (Democratic-Republican) 22.7%; ▌ ✓ George Troup (Democratic-Republican) 22.2%; ▌ ✓ Howell Cobb (Democratic-Republican) 20.6%; ▌ ✓ Dennis Smelt (Democratic-Republican) 14.8%; ▌James E. Houston (Democratic-Republican) 11.1%; ▌John M. Dooley (Democratic-Republican) 8.6%
Georgia at-large (4 seats)	Dennis Smelt	Democratic-Republican	1806 (special)	Incumbent re-elected.	Elected on a general ticket: ▌ ✓ William W. Bibb (Democratic-Republican) 22.7%; ▌ ✓ George Troup (Democratic-Republican) 22.2%; ▌ ✓ Howell Cobb (Democratic-Republican) 20.6%; ▌ ✓ Dennis Smelt (Democratic-Republican) 14.8%; ▌James E. Houston (Democratic-Republican) 11.1%; ▌John M. Dooley (Democratic-Republican) 8.6%

== Indiana Territory ==
See Non-voting delegates, below.

== Kentucky ==
District	Incumbent			This race	
District	Member	Party	First elected	Results	Candidates
Kentucky 1	Matthew Lyon	Democratic-Republican	1797 (Vt.); 1803	Incumbent re-elected.	▌ ✓ Matthew Lyon (Democratic-Republican); ▌Anthony New (Democratic-Republican)
Kentucky 2	John Boyle	Democratic-Republican	1803	Incumbent retired. Democratic-Republican hold.	▌ ✓ Samuel McKee (Democratic-Republican); ▌Philip Trapnell (Unknown); ▌John L. Bridges (Unknown)
Kentucky 3	John Rowan	Democratic-Republican	1806	Incumbent retired. Democratic-Republican hold.	▌ ✓ Henry Crist (Democratic-Republican); ▌Stephen Ormsby (Democratic-Republican)
Kentucky 4	Richard M. Johnson	Democratic-Republican	1806	Incumbent re-elected.	▌ ✓ Richard M. Johnson (Democratic-Republican) 100%
Kentucky 5	Benjamin Howard	Democratic-Republican	1806	Incumbent re-elected.	▌ ✓ Benjamin Howard (Democratic-Republican) 100%
Kentucky 6	Joseph Desha	Democratic-Republican	1806	Incumbent re-elected.	▌ ✓ Joseph Desha (Democratic-Republican) 100%

== Maryland ==
District	Incumbent			This race	
District	Member	Party	First elected	Results	Candidates
Maryland 1	John Campbell	Federalist	1801	Incumbent re-elected.	▌ ✓ John Campbell (Federalist) 70.1%; ▌James Fenwick (Democratic-Republican) 29.7%
Maryland 2	Archibald Van Horne	Democratic-Republican	1806	Incumbent re-elected.	▌ ✓ Archibald Van Horne (Democratic-Republican) 60.0%; ▌Henry A. Callis (Federalist) 40.0%
Maryland 3	Philip Barton Key	Federalist	1806	Incumbent re-elected.	▌ ✓ Philip Barton Key (Federalist) 66.5%; ▌John Wampler (Democratic-Republican) 33.5%
Maryland 4	Roger Nelson	Democratic-Republican	1804 (special)	Incumbent re-elected.	▌ ✓ Roger Nelson (Democratic-Republican) 51.8%; ▌Upton Bruce (Federalist) 48.2%
Maryland 5 Plural district with 2 seats	Nicholas R. Moore	Democratic-Republican	1803	Incumbent re-elected.	▌ ✓ Nicholas R. Moore (Democratic-Republican) 44.8%; ▌ ✓ Alexander McKim (Democratic-Republican) 43.4%; ▌William Winder (Federalist) 11.9%
Maryland 5 Plural district with 2 seats	William McCreery	Democratic-Republican	1803	Incumbent retired. Democratic-Republican hold.	▌ ✓ Nicholas R. Moore (Democratic-Republican) 44.8%; ▌ ✓ Alexander McKim (Democratic-Republican) 43.4%; ▌William Winder (Federalist) 11.9%
Maryland 6	John Montgomery	Democratic-Republican	1806	Incumbent re-elected.	▌ ✓ John Montgomery (Democratic-Republican) 51.5%; ▌William Spencer (Federalist) 32.9%; ▌John Archer (Democratic-Republican) 15.6%
Maryland 7	Edward Lloyd	Democratic-Republican	1806	Incumbent retired. Democratic-Republican hold.	▌ ✓ John Brown (Democratic-Republican) 58.6%; ▌Robert H. Goldsborough (Federalist) 41.4%
Maryland 8	Charles Goldsborough	Federalist	1804	Incumbent re-elected.	▌ ✓ Charles Goldsborough (Federalist) 75.1%; ▌Charles Nutter (Democratic-Republican) 24.9%

== Massachusetts ==
District	Incumbent			This race	
District	Member	Party	First elected	Results	Candidates
Massachusetts 1 "Suffolk district"	Josiah Quincy	Federalist	1804	Incumbent re-elected.	▌ ✓ Josiah Quincy (Federalist) 59.1%; ▌William Jarvis (Democratic-Republican) 40.8%
Massachusetts 2 "Essex South district"	Joseph Story	Democratic- Republican	1808 (special)	Incumbent retired. Federalist gain.	▌ ✓ Benjamin Pickman Jr. (Federalist) 52.2%; ▌Daniel Kilham (Democratic-Republican) 47.8%
Massachusetts 3 "Essex North district"	Edward St. Loe Livermore	Federalist	1806	Incumbent re-elected.	▌ ✓ Edward St. Loe Livermore (Federalist) 63.6%; ▌Thomas Kitteridge (Democratic-Republican) 36.0%
Massachusetts 4 "Middlesex district"	Joseph Bradley Varnum	Democratic- Republican	1794	Incumbent re-elected.	▌ ✓ Joseph Bradley Varnum (Democratic-Republican) 63.4%; ▌Abraham Bigelow (Federalist) 36.%
Massachusetts 5 "Hampshire South district"	William Ely	Federalist	1804	Incumbent re-elected.	▌ ✓ William Ely (Federalist) 66.0%; ▌Samuel Fowler (Democratic-Republican) 33.9%
Massachusetts 6 "Hampshire North district"	Samuel Taggart	Federalist	1803	Incumbent re-elected.	▌ ✓ Samuel Taggart (Federalist) 68.4%; ▌Solomon Snead (Democratic-Republican) 31.5%
Massachusetts 7 "Plymouth district"	Joseph Barker	Democratic- Republican	1804	Incumbent retired. Two ballots were held, but the second was invalidated. (Note: In the 7th district, there were 430 votes for "Charles Turner" which were counted separately from Charles Turner Jr. (Democratic-Republican). This caused the vote tally to be William Baylies (Federalist) 1,828 (49.4%), Charles Turner Jr. (Democratic-Republican) 1,443 (39.0%), "Charles Turner" 430 (11.6%). As no candidate had a majority, a second election was held on January 19, 1809 which elected Baylies with 54.3% of the vote. Turner successfully contested this election, and subsequently declared the winner based on the first ballot, with the second invalidated. He was seated June 8, 1809); Democratic-Republican hold.	▌ ✓ Charles Turner Jr. (Democratic-Republican) 50.4%; ▌William Baylies (Federalist) 49.2%
Massachusetts 8 "Barnstable district"	Isaiah L. Green	Democratic- Republican	1804	Incumbent retired. Democratic-Republican hold.	▌ ✓ Gideon Gardner (Democratic-Republican) 58.1%; ▌Wendall Davis (Federalist) 41.9%
Massachusetts 9 "Bristol district"	Josiah Dean	Democratic- Republican	1806	Lost re-election Federalist gain.	▌ ✓ Laban Wheaton (Federalist) 56.8%; ▌Josiah Dean (Democratic-Republican) 42.7%
Massachusetts 10 "Worcester South district"	Jabez Upham	Federalist	1806	Incumbent re-elected.	▌ ✓ Jabez Upham (Federalist) 54.3%; ▌Edward Bangs (Democratic-Republican) 44.4%; ▌John Spurr (Democratic-Republican) 1.2%
Massachusetts 11 "Worcester North district"	William Stedman	Federalist	1803	Incumbent re-elected.	▌ ✓ William Stedman (Federalist) 65.3%; ▌Moses White (Democratic-Republican) 32.3%; ▌Abijah Bigelow (Federalist) 1.8%
Massachusetts 12 "Berkshire district"	Ezekiel Bacon	Democratic- Republican	1807 (special)	Incumbent re-elected.	▌ ✓ Ezekiel Bacon (Democratic-Republican) 54.4%; ▌John W. Hulbert (Federalist) 45.6%
Massachusetts 13 "Norfolk district"	Ebenezer Seaver	Democratic- Republican	1803	Incumbent re-elected.	▌ ✓ Ebenezer Seaver (Democratic-Republican) 57.7%; ▌Edward Robbins (Federalist) 42.1%
Massachusetts 14 "York district" District of Maine	Richard Cutts	Democratic- Republican	1801	Incumbent re-elected.	▌ ✓ Richard Cutts (Democratic-Republican) 51.2%; ▌Joseph Leland (Federalist) 47.7%; Others 1.0%
Massachusetts 15 "Cumberland district" District of Maine	Daniel Ilsley	Democratic- Republican	1804	Lost re-election Federalist gain.	▌ ✓ Ezekiel Whitman (Federalist) 50.9%; ▌Daniel Ilsley (Democratic-Republican) 49.1%
Massachusetts 16 "Lincoln district" District of Maine	Orchard Cook	Democratic- Republican	1804	Incumbent re-elected.	▌ ✓ Orchard Cook (Democratic-Republican) 50.9%; ▌Alden Bradford (Federalist) 48.1%; ▌Barzillai Gannett (Democratic-Republican) 1.0%
Massachusetts 17 "Kennebec district" District of Maine	John Chandler	Democratic- Republican	1804	Incumbent retired. Democratic-Republican hold.	▌ ✓ Barzillai Gannett (Democratic-Republican) 50.6%; ▌Thomas Rice (Federalist) 48.7%

== Mississippi Territory ==
See Non-voting delegates, below.

== New Hampshire ==
District	Incumbent			This race	
District	Member	Party	First elected	Results	Candidates
New Hampshire at-large (5 seats)	Peter Carleton	Democratic- Republican	1806	Incumbent retired. Federalist gain.	Elected on a general ticket: ▌ ✓ William Hale (Federalist) 11.1%; ▌ ✓ Nathaniel A. Haven (Federalist) 11.1%; ▌ ✓ John C. Chamberlain (Federalist) 11.0%; ▌ ✓ Daniel Blaisdell (Federalist) 11.0%; ▌ ✓ James Wilson (Federalist) 11.0%; ▌Francis Gardner (Democratic-Republican) 9.0%; ▌Jedediah K. Smith (Democratic-Republican) 9.0%; ▌Daniel Durell (Democratic-Republican) 9.0%; ▌Charles Cutts (Democratic-Republican) 9.0%; ▌Clement Storer (Democratic-Republican) 9.0%
New Hampshire at-large (5 seats)	Daniel M. Durell	Democratic- Republican	1806	Incumbent lost re-election. Federalist gain.	Elected on a general ticket: ▌ ✓ William Hale (Federalist) 11.1%; ▌ ✓ Nathaniel A. Haven (Federalist) 11.1%; ▌ ✓ John C. Chamberlain (Federalist) 11.0%; ▌ ✓ Daniel Blaisdell (Federalist) 11.0%; ▌ ✓ James Wilson (Federalist) 11.0%; ▌Francis Gardner (Democratic-Republican) 9.0%; ▌Jedediah K. Smith (Democratic-Republican) 9.0%; ▌Daniel Durell (Democratic-Republican) 9.0%; ▌Charles Cutts (Democratic-Republican) 9.0%; ▌Clement Storer (Democratic-Republican) 9.0%
New Hampshire at-large (5 seats)	Francis Gardner	Democratic- Republican	1806	Incumbent lost re-election. Federalist gain.	Elected on a general ticket: ▌ ✓ William Hale (Federalist) 11.1%; ▌ ✓ Nathaniel A. Haven (Federalist) 11.1%; ▌ ✓ John C. Chamberlain (Federalist) 11.0%; ▌ ✓ Daniel Blaisdell (Federalist) 11.0%; ▌ ✓ James Wilson (Federalist) 11.0%; ▌Francis Gardner (Democratic-Republican) 9.0%; ▌Jedediah K. Smith (Democratic-Republican) 9.0%; ▌Daniel Durell (Democratic-Republican) 9.0%; ▌Charles Cutts (Democratic-Republican) 9.0%; ▌Clement Storer (Democratic-Republican) 9.0%
New Hampshire at-large (5 seats)	Jedediah K. Smith	Democratic- Republican	1806	Incumbent lost re-election. Federalist gain.	Elected on a general ticket: ▌ ✓ William Hale (Federalist) 11.1%; ▌ ✓ Nathaniel A. Haven (Federalist) 11.1%; ▌ ✓ John C. Chamberlain (Federalist) 11.0%; ▌ ✓ Daniel Blaisdell (Federalist) 11.0%; ▌ ✓ James Wilson (Federalist) 11.0%; ▌Francis Gardner (Democratic-Republican) 9.0%; ▌Jedediah K. Smith (Democratic-Republican) 9.0%; ▌Daniel Durell (Democratic-Republican) 9.0%; ▌Charles Cutts (Democratic-Republican) 9.0%; ▌Clement Storer (Democratic-Republican) 9.0%
New Hampshire at-large (5 seats)	Clement Storer	Democratic- Republican	1806	Incumbent lost re-election. Federalist gain.	Elected on a general ticket: ▌ ✓ William Hale (Federalist) 11.1%; ▌ ✓ Nathaniel A. Haven (Federalist) 11.1%; ▌ ✓ John C. Chamberlain (Federalist) 11.0%; ▌ ✓ Daniel Blaisdell (Federalist) 11.0%; ▌ ✓ James Wilson (Federalist) 11.0%; ▌Francis Gardner (Democratic-Republican) 9.0%; ▌Jedediah K. Smith (Democratic-Republican) 9.0%; ▌Daniel Durell (Democratic-Republican) 9.0%; ▌Charles Cutts (Democratic-Republican) 9.0%; ▌Clement Storer (Democratic-Republican) 9.0%

== New Jersey ==
District	Incumbent			This race	
District	Member	Party	First elected	Results	Candidates
New Jersey at-large (6 seats)	Adam Boyd	Democratic-Republican	1808 (special)	Incumbent re-elected.	Elected on a general ticket: ▌ ✓ Henry Southard (Democratic-Republican) 9.4%; ▌ ✓ Adam Boyd (Democratic-Republican) 9.4%; ▌ ✓ William Helms (Democratic-Republican) 9.4%; ▌ ✓ Thomas Newbold (Democratic-Republican) 9.3%; ▌ ✓ James Cox (Democratic-Republican) 9.3%; ▌ ✓ Jacob Hufty (Democratic-Republican) 9.3%; ▌John Beatty (Democratic-Republican) 7.4%; ▌William Campfield (Federalist) 7.4%; ▌William Coxe Jr. (Federalist) 7.4%; ▌John Neilson (Federalist) 7.3%; ▌Aaron Ogden (Federalist) 7.3%; ▌Samuel Harrison (Federalist) 7.3%
New Jersey at-large (6 seats)	Thomas Newbold	Democratic-Republican	1806	Incumbent re-elected.	
New Jersey at-large (6 seats)	William Helms	Democratic-Republican	1800	Incumbent re-elected.	
New Jersey at-large (6 seats)	John Lambert	Democratic-Republican	1804	Incumbent retired. Democratic-Republican hold.	
New Jersey at-large (6 seats)	Henry Southard	Democratic-Republican	1800	Incumbent re-elected.	
New Jersey at-large (6 seats)	James Sloan	Democratic-Republican	1803	Incumbent retired. Democratic-Republican hold.	

== New York ==
Between the 1806 and 1808 elections, New York went through a redistricting that reduced the number of districts to 15 by creating two plural districts with two seats each. This brought the state's 17-seat delegation from a 15-2 ratio favoring Democratic-Republicans to a nearly-even 9–8 split in their favor.

District	Incumbent			This race	
District	Member	Party	First elected	Results	Candidates
New York 1	Samuel Riker	Democratic- Republican	1806	Incumbent retired. Democratic-Republican hold.	▌ ✓ Ebenezer Sage (Democratic-Republican) 38.7%; ▌Benjamin B. Blydenburgh (Federalist) 38.3%; ▌John W. Seaman (Democratic-Republican) 23.0%
New York 2 Plural district with 2 seats	Gurdon S. Mumford; Redistricted from the 2nd/3rd district	Democratic- Republican	1804 (special)	Incumbent re-elected but declined the seat.	▌ ✓ William Denning (Democratic-Republican) 28.6%; ▌ ✓ Gurdon S. Mumford (Democratic-Republican) 28.5%; ▌William Henderson (Federalist) 21.5%; ▌Barent Gardenier (Federalist) 21.4%
New York 2 Plural district with 2 seats	George Clinton Jr. Redistricted from the 2nd/3rd district	Democratic- Republican	1805 (special)	Incumbent retired. Democratic-Republican hold.	▌ ✓ William Denning (Democratic-Republican) 28.6%; ▌ ✓ Gurdon S. Mumford (Democratic-Republican) 28.5%; ▌William Henderson (Federalist) 21.5%; ▌Barent Gardenier (Federalist) 21.4%
New York 3	John Blake Jr. Redistricted from the 5th district	Democratic- Republican	1804	Incumbent retired. Democratic-Republican hold.	▌ ✓ Jonathan Fisk (Democratic-Republican) 53.3%; ▌Richard Hatfield (Federalist) 46.7%
New York 3	Philip Van Cortlandt; Redistricted from the 4th district	Democratic- Republican	1793	Incumbent retired. Democratic-Republican loss.	▌ ✓ Jonathan Fisk (Democratic-Republican) 53.3%; ▌Richard Hatfield (Federalist) 46.7%
New York 4	Daniel C. Verplanck; Redistricted from the 6th district	Democratic- Republican	1803 (special)	Incumbent retired. Federalist gain.	▌ ✓ James Emott (Federalist) 74.3%; ▌Robert Johnston (Democratic-Republican) 25.7%
New York 5	Barent Gardenier; Redistricted from the 7th district	Federalist	1806	Incumbent re-elected.	▌ ✓ Barent Gardenier (Federalist) 56.5%; ▌John Dill (Democratic-Republican) 43.5%
New York 6 Plural district with 2 seats	James I. Van Alen; Redistricted from the 8th district	Democratic- Republican	1806	Incumbent lost re-election. Federalist gain.	▌ ✓ Herman Knickerbocker (Federalist) 26.2%; ▌ ✓ Robert Le Roy Livingston (Federalist) 26.1%; ▌James I. Van Alen (Democratic-Republican) 23.9%; ▌James L. Hogeboom (Democratic-Republican) 23.8%
New York 6 Plural district with 2 seats	Josiah Masters; Redistricted from the 10th district	Democratic- Republican	1804	Incumbent retired. Federalist gain.	▌ ✓ Herman Knickerbocker (Federalist) 26.2%; ▌ ✓ Robert Le Roy Livingston (Federalist) 26.1%; ▌James I. Van Alen (Democratic-Republican) 23.9%; ▌James L. Hogeboom (Democratic-Republican) 23.8%
New York 6 Plural district with 2 seats	Nathan Wilson; Redistricted from the 12th district	Democratic- Republican	1808	Incumbent retired. Democratic-Republican loss.	▌ ✓ Herman Knickerbocker (Federalist) 26.2%; ▌ ✓ Robert Le Roy Livingston (Federalist) 26.1%; ▌James I. Van Alen (Democratic-Republican) 23.9%; ▌James L. Hogeboom (Democratic-Republican) 23.8%
New York 7	Killian Van Rensselaer; Redistricted from the 9th district	Federalist	1800	Incumbent re-elected.	▌ ✓ Killian K. Van Rensselaer (Federalist); ▌George Merchant (Democratic-Republican)
New York 8	John Thompson; Redistricted from the 11th district	Democratic- Republican	1806	Incumbent re-elected.	▌ ✓ John Thompson (Democratic-Republican) 65.6%; ▌William Bailey (Federalist) 34.4%
New York 9	Peter Swart; Redistricted from the 13th district	Democratic- Republican	1806	Incumbent retired. Federalist gain.	▌ ✓ Thomas Sammons (Federalist) 63.3%; ▌John Herkimer (Democratic-Republican) 36.7%
New York 10	None (new district)			New seat. Democratic-Republican gain.	▌ ✓ John Nicholson (Democratic-Republican) 53.8%; ▌Moss Kent (Federalist) 46.2%
New York 11	None (new district)			New seat. Federalist gain.	▌ ✓ Thomas R. Gold (Federalist) 56.4%; ▌Joshua Hathaway (Democratic-Republican) 43.6%
New York 12	John Russell; Redistricted from the 14th district	Democratic- Republican	1806	Incumbent retired. Democratic-Republican hold.	▌ ✓ Erastus Root (Democratic-Republican) 49.5%; ▌Gabriel North (Federalist) 36.7%; ▌Ebenezer Foote (Federalist) 13.9%
New York 13	William Kirkpatrick; Redistricted from the 15th district	D-R Quid	1806	Incumbent retired. D-R Quid loss.	▌ ✓ Uri Tracy (Democratic-Republican) 68.6%; ▌Isaac Foote (Federalist) 20.0%; ▌Vincent Mathews (Federalist) 10.5%
New York 13	Reuben Humphrey; Redistricted from the 16th district	Democratic- Republican	1806	Incumbent retired. Democratic-Republican hold.	▌ ✓ Uri Tracy (Democratic-Republican) 68.6%; ▌Isaac Foote (Federalist) 20.0%; ▌Vincent Mathews (Federalist) 10.5%
New York 14	John Harris; Redistricted from the 17th district	Democratic- Republican	1806	Incumbent lost re-election. Federalist gain.	▌ ✓ Vincent Mathews (Federalist) 41.2%; ▌John Harris (Democratic-Republican) 23.4%; ▌Matthew Carpenter (Democratic-Republican) 21.2%; ▌Joseph Glover (Democratic-Republican) 14.2%
New York 15	None (new district)			New seat. Democratic-Republican gain.	▌ ✓ Peter B. Porter (Democratic-Republican) 59.9%; ▌Nathaniel W. Howell (Federalist) 40.1%

== North Carolina ==
District	Incumbent			This race	
District	Member	Party	First elected	Results	Candidates
North Carolina 1	Lemuel Sawyer	Democratic-Republican	1806	Incumbent re-elected.	▌ ✓ Lemuel Sawyer (Democratic-Republican) 67.0%; ▌William H. Murfree (Federalist) 33.0%
North Carolina 2	Willis Alston	Democratic-Republican	1798	Incumbent re-elected.	▌ ✓ Willis Alston (Democratic-Republican) 58.0%; ▌Daniel Mason (Democratic-Republican) 42.0%
North Carolina 3	Thomas Blount	Democratic-Republican	1793; 1802 (lost); 1804	Incumbent lost re-election. Democratic-Republican hold.	▌ ✓ William Kennedy (Democratic-Republican) 52.0%; ▌Thomas Blount (Democratic-Republican) 48.0%
North Carolina 4	William Blackledge	Democratic-Republican	1803	Incumbent lost re-election. Federalist gain.	▌ ✓ John Stanly (Federalist) 51.8%; ▌William Blackledge (Democratic-Republican) 48.2%
North Carolina 5	Thomas Kenan	Democratic-Republican	1805 (special)	Incumbent re-elected.	▌ ✓ Thomas Kenan (Democratic-Republican) 100%
North Carolina 6	Nathaniel Macon	Democratic-Republican	1791	Incumbent re-elected.	▌ ✓ Nathaniel Macon (Democratic-Republican) 99.9%
North Carolina 7	John Culpepper	Federalist	1806; 1808 (contested); 1808 (special)	Incumbent lost re-election. Federalist hold.	▌ ✓ Archibald McBryde (Federalist) 54.6%; ▌John Culpepper (Federalist) 45.4%
North Carolina 8	Richard Stanford	Democratic-Republican	1796	Incumbent re-elected.	▌ ✓ Richard Stanford (Democratic-Republican) 65.3%; ▌Duncan Cameron (Federalist) 34.7%
North Carolina 9	Marmaduke Williams	Democratic-Republican	1803	Incumbent retired. Democratic-Republican hold.	▌ ✓ James Cochran (Democratic-Republican) 52.3%; ▌Theophilus Lacy (Democratic-Republican) 47.3%
North Carolina 10	Evan S. Alexander	Democratic-Republican	1806 (special)	Incumbent retired. Federalist gain.	▌ ✓ Joseph Pearson (Federalist) 63.8%; ▌Robert Locke (Democratic-Republican) 36.2%
North Carolina 11	James Holland	Democratic-Republican	1800	Incumbent re-elected.	▌ ✓ James Holland (Democratic-Republican) 48.7%; ▌Felix Walker (Democratic-Republican) 31.2%; ▌John MacClain (Federalist) 9.4%; ▌William Tate (Federalist) 8.0%; ▌William Porter (Federalist) 2.8%
North Carolina 12	Meshack Franklin	Democratic-Republican	1806	Incumbent re-elected.	▌ ✓ Meshack Franklin (Democratic-Republican) 54.6%; ▌Joseph Winston (Democratic-Republican) 40.5%; ▌James Martin (Federalist) 4.9%

== Ohio ==
District	Incumbent			This race	
District	Member	Party	First elected	Results	Candidates
Ohio at-large	Jeremiah Morrow	Democratic- Republican	1803	Incumbent re-elected as a D-R Quid. D-R Quid gain.	▌ ✓ Jeremiah Morrow (D-R Quid) 71.5%; ▌Philemon Beecher (Federalist) 28.5%

== Orleans Territory ==
See Non-voting delegates, below.

== Pennsylvania ==
District	Incumbent			This race	
District	Member	Party	First elected	Results	Candidates
Pennsylvania 1 Plural district with 3 seats	Benjamin Say	Democratic-Republican	1808 (special)	Incumbent re-elected.	▌ ✓ Benjamin Say (Democratic-Republican) 18.5%; ▌ ✓ John Porter (Democratic-Republican) 18.5%; ▌ ✓ William Anderson (Democratic-Republican) 18.4%; ▌Joseph Hemphill (Federalist) 14.9%; ▌Derick Peterson (Federalist) 14.9%; ▌Charles W. Hare (Federalist) 14.8%
Pennsylvania 1 Plural district with 3 seats	John Porter	Democratic-Republican	1806	Incumbent re-elected.	▌ ✓ Benjamin Say (Democratic-Republican) 18.5%; ▌ ✓ John Porter (Democratic-Republican) 18.5%; ▌ ✓ William Anderson (Democratic-Republican) 18.4%; ▌Joseph Hemphill (Federalist) 14.9%; ▌Derick Peterson (Federalist) 14.9%; ▌Charles W. Hare (Federalist) 14.8%
Pennsylvania 1 Plural district with 3 seats	Jacob Richards	Democratic-Republican	1802	Incumbent retired. Democratic-Republican hold.	▌ ✓ Benjamin Say (Democratic-Republican) 18.5%; ▌ ✓ John Porter (Democratic-Republican) 18.5%; ▌ ✓ William Anderson (Democratic-Republican) 18.4%; ▌Joseph Hemphill (Federalist) 14.9%; ▌Derick Peterson (Federalist) 14.9%; ▌Charles W. Hare (Federalist) 14.8%
Pennsylvania 2 Plural district with 3 seats	Robert Brown	Democratic-Republican	1798 (special)	Incumbent re-elected.	▌ ✓ Robert Brown (Democratic-Republican) 16.9%; ▌ ✓ John Ross (Democratic-Republican) 16.8%; ▌ ✓ William Milnor (Federalist) 16.7%; ▌John Pugh (Democratic-Republican) 16.7%; ▌John Hahn (Democratic-Republican) 16.6%; ▌Roswell Wells (Federalist) 16.4%
Pennsylvania 2 Plural district with 3 seats	John Pugh	Democratic-Republican	1804	Lost re-election Democratic-Republican hold.	▌ ✓ Robert Brown (Democratic-Republican) 16.9%; ▌ ✓ John Ross (Democratic-Republican) 16.8%; ▌ ✓ William Milnor (Federalist) 16.7%; ▌John Pugh (Democratic-Republican) 16.7%; ▌John Hahn (Democratic-Republican) 16.6%; ▌Roswell Wells (Federalist) 16.4%
Pennsylvania 2 Plural district with 3 seats	William Milnor	Federalist Quid	1806	Incumbent re-elected.	▌ ✓ Robert Brown (Democratic-Republican) 16.9%; ▌ ✓ John Ross (Democratic-Republican) 16.8%; ▌ ✓ William Milnor (Federalist) 16.7%; ▌John Pugh (Democratic-Republican) 16.7%; ▌John Hahn (Democratic-Republican) 16.6%; ▌Roswell Wells (Federalist) 16.4%
Pennsylvania 3 Plural district with 3 seats	Matthias Richards	D-R Quid	1806	Incumbent re-elected as a Democratic-Republican. Democratic-Republican gain.	▌ ✓ Matthias Richards (Democratic-Republican) 17.1%; ▌ ✓ Daniel Hiester (Democratic-Republican) 17.1%; ▌ ✓ Robert Jenkins (Federalist) 16.9%; ▌John Whitehill (Democratic-Republican) 16.4%; ▌Roger Davis (Democratic-Republican) 16.3%; ▌William Witman (Democratic-Republican) 16.2%
Pennsylvania 3 Plural district with 3 seats	John Hiester	D-R Quid	1806	Incumbent retired. Democratic-Republican gain.	▌ ✓ Matthias Richards (Democratic-Republican) 17.1%; ▌ ✓ Daniel Hiester (Democratic-Republican) 17.1%; ▌ ✓ Robert Jenkins (Federalist) 16.9%; ▌John Whitehill (Democratic-Republican) 16.4%; ▌Roger Davis (Democratic-Republican) 16.3%; ▌William Witman (Democratic-Republican) 16.2%
Pennsylvania 3 Plural district with 3 seats	Robert Jenkins	Federalist Quid	1806	Incumbent re-elected as a Federalist.	▌ ✓ Matthias Richards (Democratic-Republican) 17.1%; ▌ ✓ Daniel Hiester (Democratic-Republican) 17.1%; ▌ ✓ Robert Jenkins (Federalist) 16.9%; ▌John Whitehill (Democratic-Republican) 16.4%; ▌Roger Davis (Democratic-Republican) 16.3%; ▌William Witman (Democratic-Republican) 16.2%
Pennsylvania 4 Plural district with 2 seats	Robert Whitehill	Democratic-Republican	1805 (special)	Incumbent re-elected.	▌ ✓ Robert Whitehill (Democratic-Republican) 36.7%; ▌ ✓ David Bard (Democratic-Republican) 36.6%; ▌John Gloninger (Federalist) 13.5%; ▌William Alexander (Federalist) 13.2%
Pennsylvania 4 Plural district with 2 seats	David Bard	D-R Quid	1802	Incumbent re-elected as a Democratic-Republican. Democratic-Republican gain.	▌ ✓ Robert Whitehill (Democratic-Republican) 36.7%; ▌ ✓ David Bard (Democratic-Republican) 36.6%; ▌John Gloninger (Federalist) 13.5%; ▌William Alexander (Federalist) 13.2%
Pennsylvania 5	Daniel Montgomery	Democratic-Republican	1806	Incumbent retired. Democratic-Republican hold.	▌ ✓ George Smith (Democratic-Republican) 82.3%; ▌John Bull (Federalist) 17.3%
Pennsylvania 6	James Kelly	Federalist	1804	Incumbent lost re-election. Democratic-Republican gain.	▌ ✓ William Crawford (Democratic-Republican) 52.4%; ▌James Kelly (Federalist) 47.6%
Pennsylvania 7	John Rea	Democratic-Republican	1802	Incumbent re-elected.	▌ ✓ John Rea (Democratic-Republican) 61.5%; ▌Andrew Dunlap (Federalist) 38.5%
Pennsylvania 8	William Findley	Democratic-Republican	1802	Incumbent re-elected.	▌ ✓ William Findley (Democratic-Republican) 45.7%; ▌John Kirkpatrick (Democratic-Republican) 29.1%; ▌Robert Philson (Democratic-Republican) 25.2%
Pennsylvania 9	John Smilie	Democratic-Republican	1792; 1794 (retired); 1798	Incumbent re-elected.	▌ ✓ John Smilie (Democratic-Republican) 67.3%; ▌Thomas Meason (Federalist) 32.7%
Pennsylvania 10	William Hoge	Democratic-Republican	1806	Incumbent retired. Democratic-Republican hold.	▌ ✓ Aaron Lyle (Democratic-Republican) 76.5%; ▌John Hamilton (Federalist) 23.5%
Pennsylvania 11	Samuel Smith	Democratic-Republican	1805 (special)	Incumbent re-elected.	▌ ✓ Samuel Smith (Democratic-Republican) 68.3%; ▌Alexander Foster (Federalist) 31.7%

== Rhode Island ==
District	Incumbent			This race	
District	Member	Party	First elected	Results	Candidates
Rhode Island at-large (2 seats)	Nehemiah Knight	Democratic- Republican	1802	Incumbent died June 13, 1808. Federalist gain. Successor (Jackson) also elected the same day to finish the term; see above.	Elected on a general ticket: ▌ ✓ Richard Jackson Jr. (Federalist) 26.6%; ▌ ✓ Elisha R. Potter (Federalist) 26.4%; ▌Isaac Wilbour (Democratic-Republican) 23.6%; ▌Jonathan Russell (Democratic-Republican) 23.4%
Rhode Island at-large (2 seats)	Isaac Wilbour	Democratic- Republican	1806	Incumbent lost re-election. Federalist gain.	Elected on a general ticket: ▌ ✓ Richard Jackson Jr. (Federalist) 26.6%; ▌ ✓ Elisha R. Potter (Federalist) 26.4%; ▌Isaac Wilbour (Democratic-Republican) 23.6%; ▌Jonathan Russell (Democratic-Republican) 23.4%

== South Carolina ==
District	Incumbent			This race	
District	Member	Party	First elected	Results	Candidates
South Carolina 1 "Charleston district"	Robert Marion	Democratic- Republican	1804	Incumbent re-elected.	▌ ✓ Robert Marion (Democratic-Republican) 68.2%; ▌Thomas Lowndes (Federalist) 30.1%
South Carolina 2 "Beaufort district"	William Butler Sr.	Democratic- Republican	1800	Incumbent re-elected.	▌ ✓ William Butler Sr. (Democratic-Republican) 96.3%; ▌Thomas Deveaux (Unknown) 2.0%
South Carolina 3 "Georgetown district"	David R. Williams	Democratic- Republican	1804	Incumbent retired. Democratic-Republican hold.	▌ ✓ Robert Witherspoon (Democratic-Republican) 72.4%; ▌Theodore Gourdin (Democratic-Republican) 27.6%
South Carolina 4 "Orangeburgh district"	John Taylor	Democratic- Republican	1806	Incumbent re-elected.	▌ ✓ John Taylor (Democratic-Republican) 100%
South Carolina 5 "Sumter district"	Richard Winn	Democratic- Republican	1802 (special)	Incumbent re-elected.	▌ ✓ Richard Winn (Democratic-Republican) 53.5%; ▌William Ellison (Unknown) 46.5%
South Carolina 6 "Abbeville district"	Joseph Calhoun	Democratic- Republican	1807 (special)	Incumbent re-elected.	▌ ✓ Joseph Calhoun (Democratic-Republican) 76.3%; ▌William Burnsides (Unknown) 26.7%
South Carolina 7 "Spartanburgh district"	Thomas Moore	Democratic- Republican	1800	Incumbent re-elected.	▌ ✓ Thomas Moore (Democratic-Republican) 100%
South Carolina 8 "Pendleton district"	Lemuel J. Alston	Democratic- Republican	1806	Incumbent re-elected.	▌ ✓ Lemuel J. Alston (Democratic-Republican) 100%

== Tennessee ==
District	Incumbent			This race	
District	Member	Party	First elected	Results	Candidates
Tennessee 1 "Washington district"	John Rhea	Democratic- Republican	1803	Incumbent re-elected.	▌ ✓ John Rhea (Democratic-Republican); Uncontested
Tennessee 2 "Hamilton district"	George W. Campbell	Democratic- Republican	1803	Incumbent retired. Democratic-Republican hold.	▌ ✓ Robert Weakley (Democratic-Republican) 47.4%; ▌Abraham Maury (Democratic-Republican) 39.9%; ▌James Lyon (Democratic-Republican) 12.6%
Tennessee 3 "Mero district"	Jesse Wharton	Democratic- Republican	1807	Incumbent retired. Democratic-Republican hold.	▌ ✓ Pleasant M. Miller (Democratic-Republican) 77.2%; Scattering 22.8%

== Vermont ==
District	Incumbent			This race	
District	Member	Party	First elected	Results	Candidates
Vermont 1 "Southwestern district"	James Witherell	Democratic- Republican	1806	Incumbent resigned May 1, 1808. Democratic-Republican hold. Successor was also elected the same day to finish the current term; see above.	▌ ✓ Samuel Shaw (Democratic-Republican) 60.9%; ▌Chauncey Langdon (Federalist) 39.1%; ▌Nathan Robinson (Federalist); ▌Jonas Galusha (Democratic-Republican)
Vermont 2 "Southeastern district"	James Elliot	Federalist	1802	Incumbent retired. Federalist hold.	First ballot (September 6, 1808): ▌Jonathan H. Hubbard (Federalist) 45.4%; ▌Aaron Leland (Democratic-Republican) 36.2%; ▌William C. Bradley (Democratic-Republican) 14.5%; Others 4.0%; Second ballot (December 13, 1808): ▌ ✓ Jonathan H. Hubbard (Federalist) 51.6%; ▌Aaron Leland (Democratic-Republican) 42.2%; ▌William C. Bradley (Democratic-Republican) 4.3%; ▌Elias Keyes (Democratic-Republican) 1.4%
Vermont 3 "Northeastern district"	James Fisk	Democratic- Republican	1802	Incumbent lost re-election. Federalist gain.	First ballot (September 6, 1808): ▌Jedediah Buckingham (Federalist) 47.9%; ▌James Fisk (Democratic-Republican) 47.4%; ▌William Chamberlain (Federalist) 2.3%; Others 2.3%; Second ballot (December 13, 1808): ▌ ✓ William Chamberlain (Federalist) 51.5%; ▌James Fisk (Democratic-Republican) 47.7%; Others 0.8%
Vermont 4 "Northwestern district"	Martin Chittenden	Federalist	1802	Incumbent re-elected.	▌ ✓ Martin Chittenden (Federalist) 59.9%; ▌Ezra Butler (Democratic-Republican) 37.6%; Others 2.5%

== Virginia ==
District	Incumbent			This race	
District	Member	Party	First elected	Results	Candidates
Virginia 1	John G. Jackson	Democratic-Republican	1803	Incumbent re-elected.	▌ ✓ John G. Jackson (Democratic-Republican) 60.3%; ▌Noah Linsey (Federalist) 29.7%
Virginia 2	John Morrow	Democratic-Republican	1805	Incumbent lost re-election. Federalist gain.	▌ ✓ James Stephenson (Federalist) 57.6%; ▌John Morrow (Democratic-Republican) 42.4%
Virginia 3	John Smith	Democratic-Republican	1801	Incumbent re-elected.	▌ ✓ John Smith (Democratic-Republican) 87.0%; ▌Robert Page (Federalist) 13.0%
Virginia 4	David Holmes	Democratic-Republican	1797	Incumbent retired. Federalist gain.	▌ ✓ Jacob Swoope (Federalist) 53.7%; ▌Daniel Smith (Democratic-Republican) 46.3%
Virginia 5	Alexander Wilson	Democratic-Republican	1804 (special)	Incumbent lost re-election. Federalist gain.	▌ ✓ James Breckinridge (Federalist); ▌Alexander Wilson (Democratic-Republican)
Virginia 6	Abram Trigg	Democratic-Republican	1797	Incumbent retired. Federalist gain.	▌ ✓ Daniel Sheffey (Federalist) 66.6%; ▌Francis Preston (Democratic-Republican) 33.4%
Virginia 7	Joseph Lewis Jr.	Federalist	1803	Incumbent re-elected.	▌ ✓ Joseph Lewis Jr. (Federalist) 62.0%; ▌William Tyler (Democratic-Republican) 38.0%
Virginia 8	Walter Jones	Democratic-Republican	1803	Incumbent re-elected.	▌ ✓ Walter Jones (Democratic-Republican); ▌John Hungerford (Democratic-Republican); ▌John Talavar (Democratic-Republican); ▌Richard Barnes (Federalist)
Virginia 9	John Love	Democratic-Republican	1807	Incumbent re-elected.	▌ ✓ John Love (Democratic-Republican) (Note: Source does not have numbers of votes, but provides a citation stating that he was "elected without opposition in one county and by a great majority in the other," his opponent or opponents in that county is not given.)
Virginia 10	John Dawson	Democratic-Republican	1797	Incumbent re-elected.	▌ ✓ John Dawson (Democratic-Republican) 100%
Virginia 11	James M. Garnett	Democratic-Republican	1805	Incumbent retired. Democratic-Republican hold.	▌ ✓ John Roane (Democratic-Republican); ▌John T. Woodford (Federalist)
Virginia 12	Burwell Bassett	Democratic-Republican	1805	Incumbent re-elected.	▌ ✓ Burwell Bassett (Democratic-Republican) 57.4%; ▌John Eyre (Federalist) 42.6%
Virginia 13	William A. Burwell	Democratic-Republican	1806 (special)	Incumbent re-elected.	▌ ✓ William A. Burwell (Democratic-Republican) 100%
Virginia 14	Matthew Clay	Democratic-Republican	1797	Incumbent re-elected.	▌ ✓ Matthew Clay (Democratic-Republican) 100%
Virginia 15	John Randolph	D-R Quid	1799	Incumbent re-elected.	▌ ✓ John Randolph (D-R Quid) 71.5%; ▌Jerman Baker (Democratic-Republican) 28.5%
Virginia 16	John W. Eppes	Democratic-Republican	1803	Incumbent re-elected.	▌ ✓ John W. Eppes (Democratic-Republican) 100%
Virginia 17	Thomas Gholson Jr.	Democratic-Republican	1808 (special)	Incumbent re-elected.	▌ ✓ Thomas Gholson Jr. (Democratic-Republican); ▌Jarvis Northampton (Federalist)
Virginia 18	Peterson Goodwyn	Democratic-Republican	1803	Incumbent re-elected.	▌ ✓ Peterson Goodwyn (Democratic-Republican) 70.5%; ▌John Pegram (Federalist) 29.5%
Virginia 19	Edwin Gray	D-R Quid	1799	Incumbent re-elected.	▌ ✓ Edwin Gray (D-R Quid) 54.5%; ▌Richard Byrd (Democratic-Republican) 37.5%; ▌William Massenburg (Democratic-Republican) 8.0%
Virginia 20	Thomas Newton Jr.	Democratic-Republican	1799	Incumbent re-elected.	▌ ✓ Thomas Newton Jr. (Democratic-Republican) 60.1%; ▌Robert B. Tayler (Federalist) 39.9%
Virginia 21	Wilson C. Nicholas	Democratic-Republican	1807	Incumbent re-elected.	▌ ✓ Wilson C. Nicholas (Democratic-Republican) 100%
Virginia 22	John Clopton	Democratic-Republican	1801	Incumbent re-elected.	▌ ✓ John Clopton (Democratic-Republican); ▌Charles Dabney (D-R Quid)

== Non-voting delegates ==
Three territories sent non-voting delegates to the 11th Congress.

Indiana Territory elected by popular vote for the first time. Mississippi Territory also elected its delegate by popular vote. Orleans Territory retained legislative election of its delegate.

District	Incumbent			This race	
District	Delegate	Party	First elected	Results	Candidates
Indiana Territory at-large	Jesse B. Thomas	Democratic- Republican	1808 (special)	New member elected November 27, 1809. Democratic-Republican hold. Election was unsuccessfully challenged.	▌ ✓ Jonathan Jennings (Democratic-Republican) 46.6%; ▌Thomas Randolph (Unknown) 43.8%; ▌John Johnson (Unknown) 8.8%
Mississippi Territory at-large	George Poindexter	Democratic- Republican	1806	Incumbent re-elected.	▌ ✓ George Poindexter (Democratic-Republican) (Note: Electoral data in source are incomplete, the top two candidates received 1,067 and 657 votes respectively, numbers of votes for the other candidates is only reported for some counties.); ▌Thomas H. Williams (Democratic-Republican); Others
Orleans Territory at-large	Daniel Clark	None	1806	Incumbent lost renomination. New member of an unknown party elected in 1808.	▌ ✓ Julien de L. Poydras (Unknown) 20; ▌Watkins (Note: Source does not give full name.) (Unknown) 5

== See also ==
- 1808 United States elections
  - List of United States House of Representatives elections (1789–1822)
  - 1808–09 United States Senate elections
  - 1808 United States presidential election
- 10th United States Congress
- 11th United States Congress

== Bibliography ==
- "A New Nation Votes: American Election Returns 1787-1825". Tufts Digital Library, Tufts University. Archived from the original on January 29, 2015.
- Dubin, Michael J. (March 1, 1998). United States Congressional Elections, 1788-1997: The Official Results of the Elections of the 1st Through 105th Congresses. McFarland and Company. ISBN 978-0786402830.
- Martis, Kenneth C. (January 1, 1989). The Historical Atlas of Political Parties in the United States Congress, 1789-1989. Macmillan Publishing Company. ISBN 978-0029201701.
- "Party Divisions of the House of Representatives* 1789–Present". Office of the Historian, United States House of Representatives.
- Mapping Early American Elections project team (2019). "Mapping Early American Elections". Roy Rosenzweig Center for History and New Media, George Mason University.
