= List of elections in 1808 =

The following elections occurred in the year 1808.

== North America ==
=== United States ===
- 1808 United States elections
- 1808 United States presidential election

==== United States lieutenant gubernatorial ====
- 1808 Connecticut lieutenant gubernatorial election

==== United States gubernatorial ====
- 1808 Connecticut gubernatorial election
- 1808 Kentucky gubernatorial election
- 1808 Maryland gubernatorial election
- 1808 Massachusetts gubernatorial election
- 1808 New Hampshire gubernatorial election
- 1808 New Jersey gubernatorial election
- 1808 North Carolina gubernatorial election
- 1808 Ohio gubernatorial election
- 1808 Pennsylvania gubernatorial election
- 1808 Rhode Island gubernatorial election
- 1808 South Carolina gubernatorial election
- 1808 Vermont gubernatorial election
- 1808 Virginia gubernatorial election

==== United States Senate ====
- 1808 and 1809 United States Senate elections
- 1808 United States Senate election in Massachusetts
- 1808 United States Senate election in Pennsylvania

==== United States House of Representatives ====
- 1808 and 1809 United States House of Representatives elections
- 1808 United States House of Representatives election in Delaware
- 1808 United States House of Representatives election in Georgia
- 1808 United States House of Representatives elections in Kentucky
- 1808 United States House of Representatives elections in Maryland
- 1808 United States House of Representatives elections in Massachusetts
- 1808 Massachusetts's 2nd congressional district special election
- 1808 United States House of Representatives election in New Hampshire
- 1808 United States House of Representatives election in New Jersey
- 1808 New Jersey's at-large congressional district special election
- 1808 United States House of Representatives elections in New York
- 1808 New York's 2nd congressional district special election
- 1808 New York's 7th congressional district special election
- 1808 New York's 12th congressional district special election
- 1808 United States House of Representatives elections in North Carolina
- 1808 North Carolina's 7th congressional district special election
- 1808 United States House of Representatives elections in Ohio
- 1808 United States House of Representatives elections in Pennsylvania
- 1808 Pennsylvania's 1st congressional district special election
- 1808 Rhode Island's at-large congressional district special election
- 1808 United States House of Representatives elections in South Carolina
- 1808 United States House of Representatives election in Vermont
- 1808 Vermont's 1st congressional district special election

== See also ==
- Category:1808 elections
