= 1806 United States House of Representatives elections in New York =

United States House of Representatives elections in New York, 1806
- April 29-May 1, 1806

All 17 New York seats to the United States House of Representatives
	Majority party	Minority party
Party	Democratic-Republican	Federalist
Last election	15	2
Seats won	15	2
Seat change	Steady	Steady
Popular vote	40,740	20,261
Percentage	66.8%	33.2%

The 1806 United States House of Representatives elections in New York were held from April 29 to May 1, 1806, to elect 17 U.S. Representatives to represent the State of New York in the United States House of Representatives of the 10th United States Congress.

== Background ==
17 U.S. Representatives had been elected in April 1804 to a term in the 9th United States Congress beginning on March 4, 1805. Samuel L. Mitchill and Daniel D. Tompkins had resigned their seats, and George Clinton, Jr., and Gurdon S. Mumford were elected to fill the vacancies. The representatives' term would end on March 3, 1807. The congressional elections were held together with the State elections in late April 1806, about ten months before the term would start on March 4, 1807, and about a year and a half before Congress actually met on October 26, 1807.

== Congressional districts ==
After the U.S. census of 1800, New York's representation in the House was increased to 17 seats. On March 30, 1802, the New York State Legislature had re-apportioned the congressional districts, dividing New York County seemingly at random into two districts. After the election of one Democratic-Republican and one Federalist in 1802, the Dem.-Rep. majority in the State Legislature gerrymandered the two districts together in an Act passed on March 20, 1804, so that two congressmen would be elected on a general ticket by the voters of both districts, assuring the election of two Democratic-Republicans.

Three new counties had been created since the last elections in 1804: Inside the 15th D., Jefferson Co. was split off from Oneida Co.; in the 16th D., Madison Co. from Chenango Co.; and in the 17th D., Allegany Co. from Genesee Co. The area of the districts remained the same.

- The 1st District comprising Queens and Suffolk counties.
- The 2nd and 3rd District (two seats) comprising New York, Kings and Richmond counties.
- The 4th District comprising Westchester and Rockland counties.
- The 5th District comprising Orange County.
- The 6th District comprising Dutchess County.
- The 7th District comprising Ulster and Greene counties.
- The 8th District comprising Columbia County.
- The 9th District comprising Albany County.
- The 10th District comprising Rensselaer County.
- The 11th District comprising Clinton, Saratoga and Essex counties.
- The 12th District comprising Washington County.
- The 13th District comprising Montgomery and Schoharie counties.
- The 14th District comprising Delaware and Otsego counties.
- The 15th District comprising Herkimer, Oneida and Jefferson counties.
- The 16th District comprising Chenango, Tioga, Onondaga and Madison counties.
- The 17th District comprising Ontario, Steuben, Cayuga, Seneca and Allegany counties.

Note: There are now 62 counties in the State of New York. The counties which are not mentioned in this list had not yet been established, or sufficiently organized, the area being included in one or more of the abovementioned counties.

== Result ==
14 Clintonians, 2 Federalists and 1 Lewisite were elected. The incumbents Mumford, Clinton, Van Cortlandt, Blake, Verplanck, Van Rensselaer, Masters, Thomas and Russell were re-elected; the incumbents Sailly, Tracy and Halsey were defeated.

1806 United States House election result
District	Democratic-Republican (Clintonian)		Federalist		Democratic-Republican (Lewisite)		Democratic-Republican		Democratic-Republican (Lewisite)	
1	Samuel Riker	1,499								
2 and 3	Gurdon S. Mumford	4,617	John B. Coles	3,707	John R. Livingston	173				
2 and 3	George Clinton, Jr.	4,406	Nicholas Fish	3,695						
4	Philip Van Cortlandt	969	Peter A. Jay	855	Samuel S. Smith	127	Peter Taulman	135		
5	John Blake, Jr.	1,396	Reuben Hopkins	822						
6	Daniel C. Verplanck	1,208								
7	Johannes Bruyn	515	Barent Gardenier	1,408	William A. Thompson	1,024				
8	James I. Van Alen	1,735	Robert Le Roy Livingston	1,725						
9	Benjamin DeWitt	891	Killian K. Van Rensselaer	1,269	Henry Glen	562				
10	Josiah Masters	1,282	Hosea Moffitt	1,146						
11	John Thompson	2,018	Asahel Porter	1,381	Peter Sailly	91				
12	David Thomas	1,574								
13	Peter Swart	2,825	Isaac H. Tiffany	1,245						
14	John Russell	2,129	Solomon Martin	1,034						
15	John Nicholson	2,124			William Kirkpatrick	2,628				
16	Reuben Humphrey	3,308	Thaddeus M. Wood	313	John Cantine	119			Uri Tracy	101
17	John Harris	1,736	Daniel W. Lewis	1,661	Silas Halsey	1,457	James Faulkner	91		

Note: The Anti-Federalists called themselves "Republicans." However, at the same time, the Federalists called them "Democrats" which was meant to be pejorative. After some time both terms got more and more confused, and sometimes used together as "Democratic Republicans" which later historians have adopted (with a hyphen) to describe the party from the beginning, to avoid confusion with both the later established and still existing Democratic and Republican parties.

At this time, the Democratic-Republican Party was split into two factions: the "Clintonians" led by DeWitt Clinton, and the "Lewisites" led by Governor Morgan Lewis.

== Aftermath and special election ==
The House of Representatives of the 10th United States Congress met for the first time at the United States Capitol in Washington, D.C., on October 26, 1807, and Blake, Gardenier, Harris, Humphrey, Kirkpatrick, Masters, Riker, Russell, Swart, Thomas Thompson, Van Alen, Van Cortlandt, Van Rensselaer and Verplanck took their seats on this day. Mumford took his seat on November 2, and Clinton on February 1, 1808.

David Thomas was appointed New York State Treasurer on February 5, 1808, and resigned his seat. His letter of resignation was read in the House on February 17. A special election to fill the vacancy was held at the annual State election in April 1808, and was won by Nathan Wilson, of the same party. Wilson took his seat on November 7, 1808.

1808 United States House special election result
District	Democratic-Republican		Federalist	
12	Nathan Wilson	2,327	Asa Fitch	1,755

== Sources ==
- The New York Civil List compiled in 1858 (see: pg. 65 for district apportionment; pg. 69 for Congressmen)
- Members of the Tenth United States Congress [gives wrong resignation date "May 1, 1808" for Thomas]
- Election result 1st D. at Tufts University Library project "A New Nation Votes"
- Election result 2nd/3rd D. at Tufts University Library project "A New Nation Votes"
- Election result 4th D. at Tufts University Library project "A New Nation Votes"
- Election result 5th D. at Tufts University Library project "A New Nation Votes"
- Election result 6th D. at Tufts University Library project "A New Nation Votes"
- Election result 7th D. at Tufts University Library project "A New Nation Votes"
- Election result 8th D. at Tufts University Library project "A New Nation Votes"
- Election result 9th D. at Tufts University Library project "A New Nation Votes"
- 10th D. at Ourcampaigns.com
- Election result 11th D. at Tufts University Library project "A New Nation Votes"
- 12th D. at Ourcampaigns.com
- Election result 13th D. at Tufts University Library project "A New Nation Votes"
- Election result 14th D. at Tufts University Library project "A New Nation Votes"
- Election result 15th D. at Tufts University Library project "A New Nation Votes"
- Election result 16th D. at Tufts University Library project "A New Nation Votes"
- Election result 17th D. at Tufts University Library project "A New Nation Votes"
- Special election result 12th D. at Tufts University Library project "A New Nation Votes"
