= 1808 United States House of Representatives elections in New York =

United States House of Representatives elections in New York, 1808
- April 26–28, 1808

All 17 New York seats to the United States House of Representatives
| | Majority party | Minority party |
|---|---|---|
| Party | Democratic-Republican | Federalist |
| Last election | 15 | 2 |
| Seats won | 9 | 8 |
| Seat change | ▼6 | ▲6 |
| Popular vote | 54,970 | 53,283 |
| Percentage | 50.8% | 49.2% |
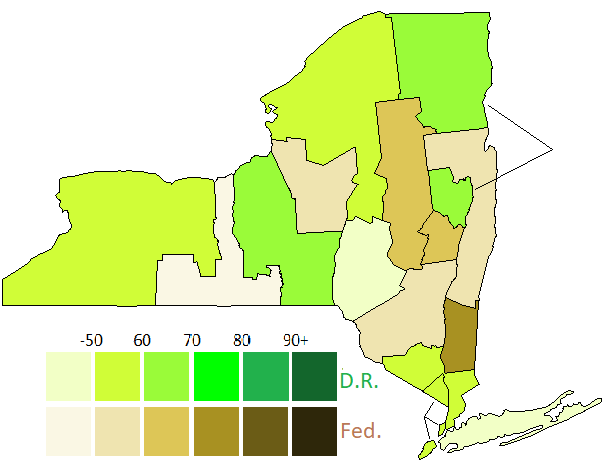
- Results by district. Both seats of the 2nd and 6th districts were of the same party and elected with similar margins.

The 1808 United States House of Representatives elections in New York were held from April 26 to 28, 1808, to elect 17 U.S. Representatives to represent the State of New York in the United States House of Representatives of the 11th United States Congress. At the same time, a vacancy was filled in the 10th United States Congress.

== Background ==
17 U.S. Representatives had been elected in April 1806 to a term in the 10th United States Congress beginning on March 4, 1807. David Thomas had been elected New York State Treasurer in February 1808, and had resigned his seat, leaving a vacancy in the former 12th District. The other 16 representatives' term would end on March 3, 1809. The congressional elections were held together with the State elections in late April 1808, about ten months before the term would start on March 4, 1809, and a little more than a year before Congress actually met on May 22, 1809.

== Congressional districts ==
After the U.S. census of 1800, New York's representation in the House was increased to 17 seats. On March 30, 1802, the New York State Legislature had re-apportioned the congressional districts, dividing New York County seemingly at random into two districts. After the election of one Democratic-Republican and one Federalist in 1802, the Dem.-Rep. majority in the State Legislature gerrymandered the two districts together in an Act passed on March 20, 1804, so that two congressmen would be elected on a general ticket by the voters of both districts, assuring the election of two Democratic-Republicans. On April 8, 1808, the State Legislature re-apportioned the districts again, separating the 2nd and the 3rd District, and creating two districts with two seats each to be filled on a general ticket: the 2nd and the 6th.

David Thomas had been elected in the old 12th District which had comprised only Washington Co., so the vacancy was filled by a special election held only in this county, while at the same time two representatives were elected on a general ticket in the new 6th District to which Washington Co. had been re-districted together with Columbia Co. and Rensselaer Co.

Due to the double-seat districts, there were then only 15 districts; the 16th and 17th were eliminated.

- The 1st District comprising Kings, Queens and Suffolk counties.
- The 2nd District (two seats) comprising New York, Richmond and Rockland counties.
- The 3rd District comprising Orange and Westchester counties.
- The 4th District comprising Dutchess County.
- The 5th District comprising Ulster, Greene counties.
- The 6th District (two seats) comprising Columbia, Rensselaer and Washington counties.
- The 7th District comprising Albany County.
- The 8th District comprising Clinton, Saratoga and Essex counties.
- The 9th District comprising Montgomery and Schoharie counties.
- The 10th District comprising Herkimer, St. Lawrence, Jefferson and Lewis counties.
- The 11h District comprising Oneida and Madison counties.
- The 12h District comprising Delaware and Otsego counties.
- The 13th District comprising Chenango, Onondaga, Broome and Cortland counties.
- The 14th District comprising Tioga, Steuben, Cayuga and Seneca counties.
- The 15th District comprising Ontario, Genesee and Allegany counties.

Note: There are now 62 counties in the State of New York. The counties which are not mentioned in this list had not yet been established, or sufficiently organized, the area being included in one or more of the above-mentioned counties.

== Result ==
9 Democratic-Republicans and 8 Federalists were elected to the 11th Congress, and one Democratic-Republican to fill the vacancy in the 10th Congress. The incumbents Mumford, Gardenier, Van Rensselaer and Thompson were re-elected; the incumbents Van Alen and Harris were defeated.

1808 United States House election result
| District | Democratic-Republican | | Federalist | | Also ran | | | |
|---|---|---|---|---|---|---|---|---|
| 1 | Ebenezer Sage | 1,645 | Benjamin B. Blydenburgh | 1,627 | John W. Seaman (DR) | 975 | | |
| 2 | William Denning | 6,203 | William Henderson | 4,667 | | | | |
| 2 | Gurdon S. Mumford | 6,185 | Barent Gardenier | 4,660 | | | | |
| 3 | Jonathan Fisk | 2,422 | Richard Hatfield | 2,123 | | | | |
| 4 | Robert Johnston | 556 | James Emott | 1,606 | | | | |
| 5 | John Dill | 2,059 | Barent Gardenier | 2,677 | | | | |
| 6 | James I. Van Alen | 5,912 | Herman Knickerbocker | 6,648 | | | | |
| 6 | James L. Hogeboom | 5,879 | Robert Le Roy Livingston | 6,432 | | | | |
| 7 | George Merchant | 1,433 | Killian K. Van Rensselaer | 2,678 | | | | |
| 8 | John Thompson | 2,489 | William Bailey | 1,305 | | | | |
| 9 | John Herkimer | 2,114 | Thomas Sammons | 3,644 | | | | |
| 10 | John Nicholson | 2,352 | Moss Kent | 2,019 | | | | |
| 11 | Joshua Hathaway | 2,959 | Thomas R. Gold | 3,821 | | | | |
| 12 | Erastus Root | 2,205 | Gabriel North | 1,634 | Ebenezer Foote (F) | 619 | | |
| 13 | Uri Tracy | 3,213 | Isaac Foote | 941 | Vincent Mathews (F) | 494 | | |
| 14 | John Harris | 1,066 | Vincent Mathews | 1,877 | Matthew Carpenter (DR) | 969 | Joseph Glover (DR) | 649 |
| 15 | Peter B. Porter | 3,066 | Nathaniel W. Howell | 2,055 | | | | |
| Old 12 Special | Nathan Wilson | 2,327 | Asa Fitch | 1,755 | | | | |

Note: The Anti-Federalists called themselves "Republicans." However, at the same time, the Federalists called them "Democrats" which was meant to be pejorative. After some time both terms got more and more confused, and sometimes used together as "Democratic Republicans" which later historians have adopted (with a hyphen) to describe the party from the beginning, to avoid confusion with both the later established and still existing Democratic and Republican parties.

== Aftermath and special election ==
Nathan Wilson took his seat in the 10th United States Congress on November 7, 1808.

The House of Representatives of the 11th United States Congress met for the first time at the United States Capitol in Washington, D.C., on May 22, 1809, and Emott, Fisk, Gardenier, Gold, Knickerbocker, Livingston, Nicholson, Porter, Sage, Sammons, Thompson, Tracy and Van Rensselaer took their seats on this day. Mathews took his seat on May 23; Mumford on May 24; and Root on June 7.

William Denning never took his seat, and resigned. A special election to fill the vacancy was held at the annual State election in April 1810, and was won by Samuel L. Mitchill, of the same party. Mitchill, a former U.S. Representative (1801–1804) and U.S. Senator (1804–1809), took his seat on December 4, 1810.

1810 United States House special election result
| District | Democratic-Republican | Federalist |
|---|---|---|
| 2 | Samuel L. Mitchill | John B. Coles |

== Sources ==
- The New York Civil List compiled in 1858 (see: pg. 66 for district apportionment; pg. 69 for Congressmen)
- Members of the Eleventh United States Congress
- Election result 1st D. at project "A New Nation Votes", compiled by Phil Lampi, hosted by Tufts University Digital Library
- Election result 2nd D. at "A New Nation Votes"
- Election result 3rd D. at "A New Nation Votes"
- Election result 4th D. at "A New Nation Votes"
- Election result 5th D. at "A New Nation Votes"
- Election result 6th D. at "A New Nation Votes"
- Election result 7th D. at Ourcampaigns.com
- Election result 8th D. at "A New Nation Votes"
- Election result 9th D. at "A New Nation Votes"
- Election result 10th D. at "A New Nation Votes"
- Election result 11th D. at "A New Nation Votes"
- Election result 12th D. at "A New Nation Votes"
- Election result 13th D. at "A New Nation Votes"
- Election result 14th D. at "A New Nation Votes"
- Election result 15th D. at "A New Nation Votes"
- Special election result former 12th D. at "A New Nation Votes"
- Special election result 1810 2nd D. at "A New Nation Votes" [lists only returns from Richmond and Rockland counties]
