= 1804 United States House of Representatives elections in New York =

United States House of Representatives elections in New York, 1804
- April 24–26, 1804

All 17 New York seats to the United States House of Representatives
	Majority party	Minority party
Party	Democratic-Republican	Federalist
Last election	12	5
Seats won	15	2
Seat change	▲3	▼3
Popular vote	44,889	24,682
Percentage	64.5%	35.5%

The 1804 United States House of Representatives elections in New York were held from April 24 to 26, 1804, to elect 17 U.S. Representatives to represent the State of New York in the United States House of Representatives of the 9th United States Congress. At the same time, a vacancy was filled in the 8th United States Congress.

== Background ==
17 U.S. Representatives had been elected in April 1802 to a term in the 8th United States Congress beginning on March 4, 1803. John Cantine had resigned his seat, and Isaac Bloom had died in April 1803. Josiah Hasbrouck and Daniel C. Verplanck were elected to fill the vacancies. In February 1804, John Smith was elected to the U.S. Senate, leaving a vacancy in the 1st District. The other 16 representatives' term would end on March 3, 1805. The congressional elections were held together with the State elections in late April 1804, about ten months before the term would start on March 4, 1805, and about a year and a half before Congress actually met on December 2, 1805.

== Congressional districts ==
After the U.S. census of 1800, New York's representation in the House was increased to 17 seats. On March 30, 1802, the New York State Legislature had re-apportioned the congressional districts, dividing New York County seemingly at random into two districts. After the election of one Democratic-Republican and one Federalist in 1802, the Dem.-Rep. majority in the State Legislature gerrymandered the two districts together in an Act passed on March 20, 1804, so that two congressmen would be elected on a general ticket by the voters of both districts, assuring the election of two Democratic-Republicans.

Besides, Seneca Co. was split from Cayuga Co. inside the 17th District.

- The 1st District comprising Queens and Suffolk counties.
- The 2nd and 3rd District (two seats) comprising New York, Kings and Richmond counties.
- The 4th District comprising Westchester and Rockland counties.
- The 5th District comprising Orange County.
- The 6th District comprising Dutchess County.
- The 7th District comprising Ulster and Greene counties.
- The 8th District comprising Columbia County.
- The 9th District comprising Albany County.
- The 10th District comprising Rensselaer County.
- The 11h District comprising Clinton, Saratoga and Essex counties.
- The 12h District comprising Washington County.
- The 13th District comprising Montgomery and Schoharie counties.
- The 14th District comprising Delaware and Otsego counties.
- The 15th District comprising Herkimer and Oneida counties.
- The 16th District comprising Chenango, Tioga and Onondaga counties.
- The 17th District comprising Ontario, Steuben, Cayuga and Seneca counties.

Note: There are now 62 counties in the State of New York. The counties which are not mentioned in this list had not yet been established, or sufficiently organized, the area being included in one or more of the abovementioned counties.

== Result ==
15 Democratic-Republicans and 2 Federalists were elected to the 9th Congress, and one Democratic-Republican to fill the vacancy in the 8th Congress. The incumbents Mitchill, Van Cortlandt, Verplanck, Livingston, Van Rensselaer, Thomas and Sammons were re-elected; the incumbent Root was defeated.

1804 United States House election result
District	Democratic-Republican		Federalist		Democratic-Republican		Federalist		Democratic-Republican		Federalist	
1	Eliphalet Wickes	1,052	Joshua Smith	840	Samuel Riker	1,044						
2 and 3	Samuel L. Mitchill	4,056	Nicholas Fish	3,245								
2 and 3	Daniel D. Tompkins	4,040	Wynandt Van Zandt	3,236								
4	Philip Van Cortlandt	1,545			John Herring	838						
5	John Blake, Jr.	1,411	David M. Westcott	826								
6	Daniel C. Verplanck	2,291	Benjamin Akin	1,658								
7	Martin G. Schuneman	2,361	Gerrit Abeel	1,578								
8	Edward P. Livingston	1,610	Henry W. Livingston	1,951								
9	David McCarty	1,465	Killian K. Van Rensselaer	1,894								
10	Josiah Masters	1,851	Jonathan Brown	1,492								
11	Peter Sailly	2,846										
12	David Thomas	2,367	Reuben Skinner	1,001								
13	Thomas Sammons	3,290										
14	John Russell	2,512	Benjamin Gilbert	177	Erastus Root	105	Solomon Martin	105			Thomas R. Gold	28
15	Nathan Williams	3,633	Thomas R. Gold	2,697								
16	Uri Tracy	3,222	Edward Edwards	1,911								
17	Silas Halsey	2,167	Nathaniel W. Howell	2,013	Joseph Grover	602			Peter Hughes	581		

Note: The Anti-Federalists called themselves "Republicans." However, at the same time, the Federalists called them "Democrats" which was meant to be pejorative. After some time both terms got more and more confused, and sometimes used together as "Democratic Republicans" which later historians have adopted (with a hyphen) to describe the party from the beginning, to avoid confusion with both the later established and still existing Democratic and Republican parties.

== Aftermath and special elections ==
Daniel D. Tompkins, elected in the 2nd/3rd D., was appointed on July 2, 1804, to the New York Supreme Court and resigned his seat, before the congressional term began. A special election to fill the vacancy was held in October 1804, and was won by Gurdon S. Mumford, of the same party.

Samuel L. Mitchill, who had been re-elected in the 2nd/3rd D. to a third term, resigned his seat on November 22, 1804, after his election to the U.S. Senate. A special election to fill both vacancies (the remainder of his term in the 8th Congress and his seat in the 9th Congress) was held, and was won by George Clinton, Jr., of the same party. Clinton took his seat in the 8th Congress on February 14, 1805, and remained in office after March 4 in the 9th Congress.

Candidate	Party	Votes
George Clinton, Jr.	Democratic-Republican	1,065
James Smith		63
James Woods		52
other		22

The House of Representatives of the 9th United States Congress met for the first time at the United States Capitol in Washington, D.C., on December 2, 1805, and Blake, Halsey, Masters, Mumford, Russell, Sailly, Sammons, Schuneman, Thomas, Tracy, Van Rensselaer and Williams took their seats on this day. Livingston and Wickes took their seats on December 9; Van Cortlandt on December 10; Verplanck on December 11; and Clinton on December 16.

== Sources ==
- The New York Civil List compiled in 1858 (see: pg. 65 for district apportionment; pg. 69 for Congressmen)
- Members of the Ninth United States Congress
- Election result 1st D. at Tufts University Library project "A New Nation Votes"
- Election result 2nd/3rd D. at Tufts University Library project "A New Nation Votes"
- Election result 4th D. at Tufts University Library project "A New Nation Votes"
- Election result 5th D. at Tufts University Library project "A New Nation Votes"
- Election result 6th D. at Tufts University Library project "A New Nation Votes"
- Election result 7th D. at Tufts University Library project "A New Nation Votes"
- Election result 8th D. at Tufts University Library project "A New Nation Votes"
- Election result 9th D. at Tufts University Library project "A New Nation Votes"
- Election result 10th D. at Tufts University Library project "A New Nation Votes"
- Election result 11th D. at Tufts University Library project "A New Nation Votes"
- Election result 12th D. at Tufts University Library project "A New Nation Votes"
- Election result 13th D. at Tufts University Library project "A New Nation Votes"
- Election result 14th D. at Tufts University Library project "A New Nation Votes"
- Election result 15th D. at Tufts University Library project "A New Nation Votes"
- Election result 16th D. at Tufts University Library project "A New Nation Votes"
- Election result 17th D. at Tufts University Library project "A New Nation Votes"
