= 10th United States Congress =

Meeting of the United States federal government's legislative branch (1807-09)

←	9th	11th	→
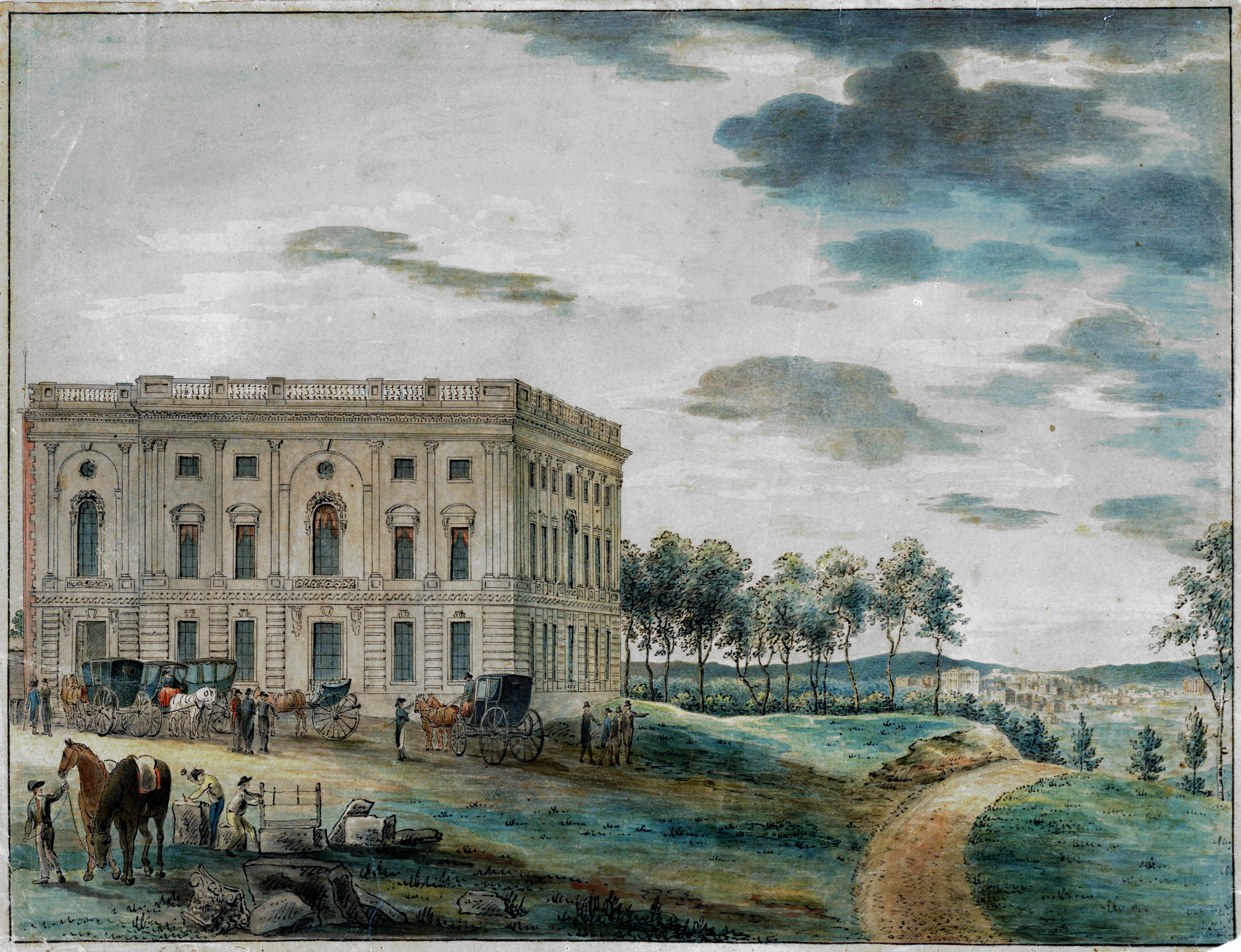
- United States Capitol (1800)

Overview
- Legislative body: United States Congress
- Jurisdiction: United States
- Term: March 4, 1807 – March 4, 1809

Senate
- Members: 34
- President: George Clinton (DR)
- President pro tempore: Samuel Smith (DR); Stephen R. Bradley (DR); John Milledge (DR)
- Party control: Democratic-Republican

House of Representatives
- Members: 142 representatives 3 non-voting delegates
- Speaker: Joseph Bradley Varnum (DR)
- Party control: Democratic-Republican

Sessions
- 1st: October 26, 1807 – April 25, 1808
- 2nd: November 7, 1808 – March 3, 1809

The 10th United States Congress was a meeting of the legislative branch of the United States federal government, consisting of the Senate and the House of Representatives. It met in Washington, D.C., from March 4, 1807, to March 4, 1809, during the seventh and eighth years of Thomas Jefferson's presidency. The apportionment of seats in the House of Representatives was based on the 1800 census; both chambers had an overwhelming Democratic-Republican majority.

== Major events ==
- May 22, 1807: Former Vice President of the United States Aaron Burr was indicted for treason. He was acquitted September 1, 1807
- June 1807: Chesapeake-Leopard Affair: The British warship HMS Leopard (1790) captured and boarded the USS Chesapeake (1799).
- August 17, 1807: The Clermont, Robert Fulton's first American steamboat, left New York City for Albany, New York, on the Hudson River, inaugurating the first commercial steamboat service in the world.
- January 1, 1808: The importation of slaves into the United States was banned

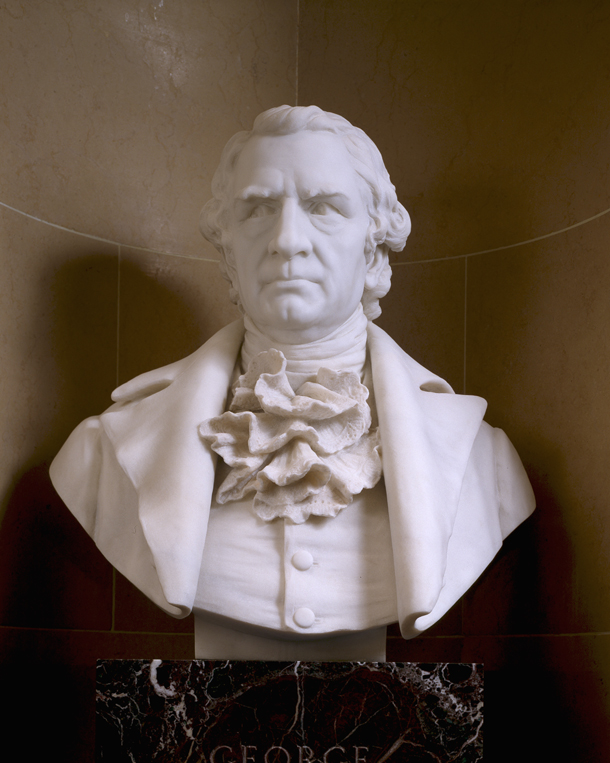
President of the Senate George Clinton

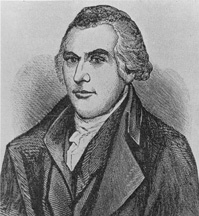
President pro tempore Stephen R. Bradley

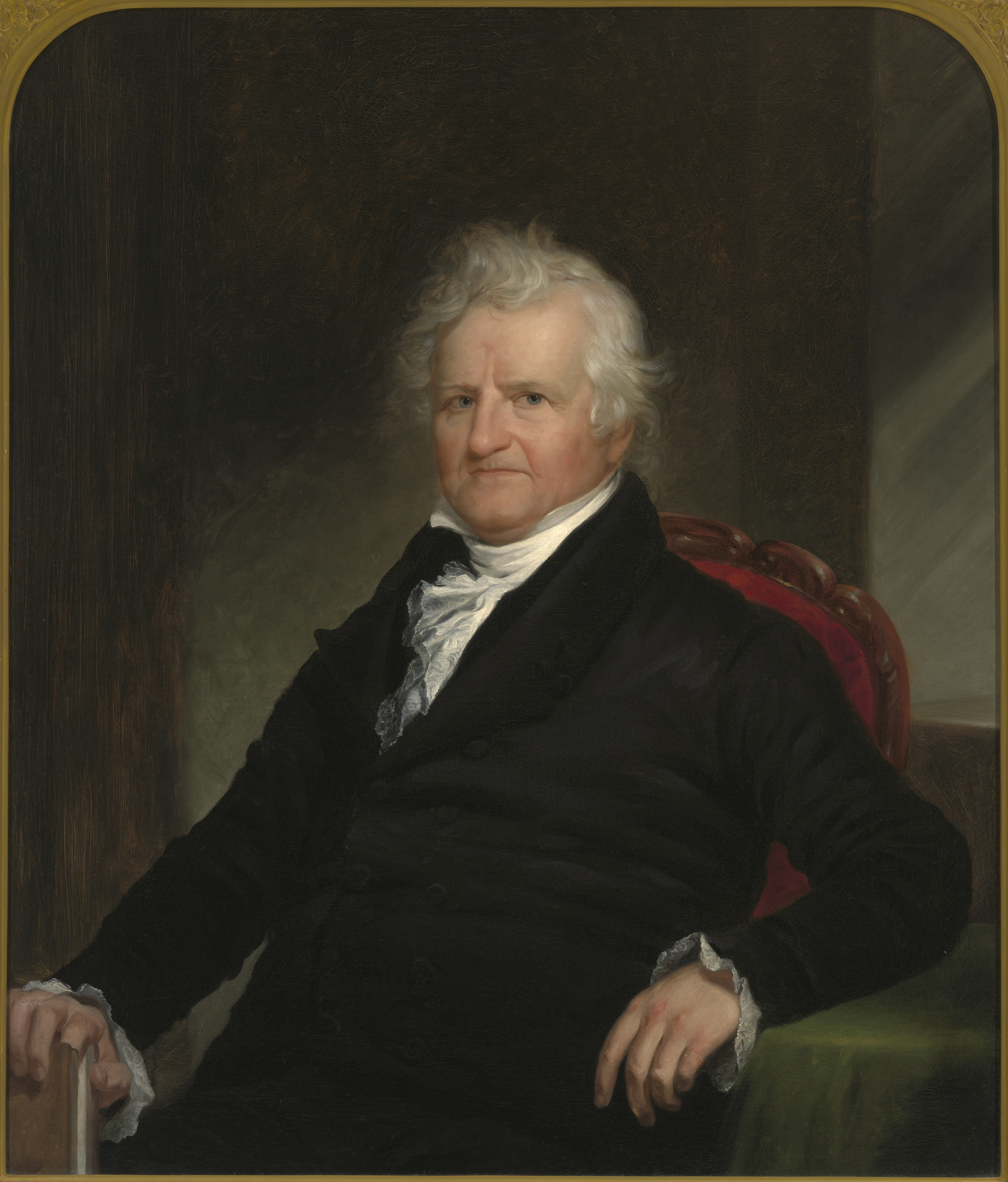
Speaker of the House Joseph B. Varnum

== Major legislation ==
- December 22, 1807: Embargo Act of 1807, ch. 5, 2 Stat. 451
- March 1, 1809: Non-Intercourse Act (1809), ch. 24, 2 Stat. 528

== Territories organized ==
- February 3, 1809: Illinois Territory was organized from a portion of Indiana Territory, 2 Stat. 514

== Party summary ==
The count below identifies party affiliations at the beginning of the first session of this Congress. Changes resulting from subsequent replacements are shown below in the "Changes in membership" section.

=== Senate ===
	Party (shading shows control)		Total	Vacant
	Democratic- Republican (DR)	Federalist (F)	Total	Vacant
End of previous congress	27	7	34	0
Begin	28	6	34	0
End	28	6	34	0
Final voting share	82.4%	17.6%		
Beginning of next congress	26	7	33	1

=== House of Representatives ===
	Party (shading shows control)		Total	Vacant
	Democratic- Republican (DR)	Federalist (F)	Total	Vacant
End of previous congress	113	28	141	1
Begin	115	25	140	2
End	115	27	142	0
Final voting share	81.0%	19.0%		
Beginning of next congress	95	47	142	0

== Leadership ==
=== Senate ===
- President: George Clinton (DR)
- President pro tempore: Samuel Smith (DR), elected April 16, 1808
  - Stephen R. Bradley (DR), elected December 28, 1808
  - John Milledge (DR), elected January 30, 1809

=== House of Representatives ===
- Speaker: Joseph Bradley Varnum (DR)

== Members ==
This list is arranged by chamber, then by state. Senators are listed in order of seniority, and representatives are listed by district.

Skip to House of Representatives, below

=== Senate ===
Senators were elected by the state legislatures every two years, with one-third beginning new six-year terms with each Congress. Preceding the names in the list below are Senate class numbers, which indicate the cycle of their election.

==== Connecticut ====
▌1. James Hillhouse (F)
▌3. Uriah Tracy (F), died July 19, 1807

▌Chauncey Goodrich (F), from October 25, 1807

==== Delaware ====
▌1. Samuel White (F)
▌2. James A. Bayard (F)

==== Georgia ====
▌2. Abraham Baldwin (DR), until March 4, 1807

▌George Jones (DR), August 27, 1807 – November 7, 1807
▌William H. Crawford (DR), from November 7, 1807

▌3. John Milledge (DR)

==== Kentucky ====
▌2. Buckner Thruston (DR)
▌3. John Pope (DR)

==== Maryland ====
▌1. Samuel Smith (DR)
▌3. Philip Reed (DR)

==== Massachusetts ====
▌2. Timothy Pickering (F)
▌1. John Quincy Adams (F), until June 8, 1808

▌James Lloyd (F), from June 9, 1808

==== New Hampshire ====
▌2. Nicholas Gilman (DR)
▌3. Nahum Parker (DR)

==== New Jersey ====
▌1. John Condit (DR)
▌2. Aaron Kitchell (DR)

==== New York ====
▌3. John Smith (DR)
▌1. Samuel L. Mitchill (DR)

==== North Carolina ====
▌2. James Turner (DR)
▌3. Jesse Franklin (DR)

==== Ohio ====
▌1. John Smith (DR), until April 25, 1808

▌Return J. Meigs Jr. (DR), from December 12, 1808

▌3. Edward Tiffin (DR)

==== Pennsylvania ====
▌1. Samuel Maclay (DR), until January 4, 1809

▌Michael Leib (DR), from January 9, 1809

▌3. Andrew Gregg (DR)

==== Rhode Island ====
▌1. Benjamin Howland (DR)
▌2. James Fenner (DR), until September 1807

▌Elisha Mathewson (DR), from October 26, 1807

==== South Carolina ====
▌2. Thomas Sumter (DR)
▌3. John Gaillard (DR)

==== Tennessee ====
▌1. Joseph Anderson (DR)
▌2. Daniel Smith (DR)

==== Vermont ====
▌3. Stephen R. Bradley (DR)
▌1. Israel Smith (DR), until October 1, 1807

▌Jonathan Robinson (DR), from October 10, 1807

==== Virginia ====
▌2. William B. Giles (DR)
▌1. Andrew Moore (DR)

Senators' party membership by state at the opening of the 10th Congress in March 1807. 2 Democratic-Republicans 2 Federalists

=== House of Representatives ===
The names of representatives are preceded by their district numbers.

==== Connecticut ====
All representatives were elected statewide on a general ticket.
(7 Federalists)

▌At-large. Epaphroditus Champion (F)
▌At-large. Samuel W. Dana (F)
▌At-large. John Davenport (F)
▌At-large. Jonathan O. Moseley (F)
▌At-large. Timothy Pitkin (F)
▌At-large. Lewis B. Sturges (F)
▌At-large. Benjamin Tallmadge (F)

==== Delaware ====
(1 Federalist)

▌At-large. Nicholas Van Dyke (F), from October 6, 1807

==== Georgia ====
(4 Democratic-Republicans)

▌At-large. William W. Bibb (DR)
▌At-large. Howell Cobb (DR)
▌At-large. Dennis Smelt (DR)
▌At-large. George M. Troup (DR)

==== Kentucky ====
(6 Democratic-Republicans)

▌1. Matthew Lyon (DR)
▌2. John Boyle (DR)
▌3. John Rowan (DR)
▌4. Richard M. Johnson (DR)
▌5. Benjamin Howard (DR)
▌6. Joseph Desha (DR)

==== Maryland ====
The 5th district was a plural district with two representatives.
(6-3 Democratic-Republican)

▌1. John Campbell (F)
▌2. Archibald Van Horne (DR)
▌3. Philip B. Key (F)
▌4. Roger Nelson (DR)
▌5. William McCreery (DR)
▌5. Nicholas R. Moore (DR)
▌6. John Montgomery (DR)
▌7. Edward Lloyd (DR)
▌8. Charles Goldsborough (F)

==== Massachusetts ====
(11-6 Democratic-Republican)

▌1. Josiah Quincy (F)
▌2. Jacob Crowninshield (DR), until April 15, 1808

▌Joseph Story (DR), from May 23, 1808

▌3. Edward St. Loe Livermore (F)
▌4. Joseph Bradley Varnum (DR)
▌5. William Ely (F)
▌6. Samuel Taggart (F)
▌7. Joseph Barker (DR)
▌8. Isaiah L. Green (DR)
▌9. Josiah Dean (DR)
▌10. Jabez Upham (F)
▌11. William Stedman (F)
▌12. Barnabas Bidwell (DR), until July 13, 1807

▌Ezekiel Bacon (DR), from September 16, 1807

▌13. Ebenezer Seaver (DR)
▌14. Richard Cutts (DR)
▌15. Daniel Ilsley (DR)
▌16. Orchard Cook (DR)
▌17. John Chandler (DR)

==== New Hampshire ====
All representatives were elected statewide on a general ticket.
(5 Democratic-Republicans)

▌At-large. Peter Carleton (DR)
▌At-large. Daniel M. Durell (DR)
▌At-large. Francis Gardner (DR)
▌At-large. Jedediah K. Smith (DR)
▌At-large. Clement Storer (DR)

==== New Jersey ====
All representatives were elected statewide on a general ticket.
(6 Democratic-Republicans)

▌At-large. Ezra Darby (DR), until January 27, 1808

▌Adam Boyd (DR), from March 8, 1808

▌At-large. William Helms (DR)
▌At-large. John Lambert (DR)
▌At-large. Thomas Newbold (DR)
▌At-large. James Sloan (DR)
▌At-large. Henry Southard (DR)

==== New York ====
(15-2 Democratic-Republican)

▌1. Samuel Riker (DR)
▌2. and 3. Joint district with two seats: Gurdon S. Mumford (DR)
▌2. and 3. Joint district with two seats: George Clinton Jr. (DR)
▌4. Philip Van Cortlandt (DR)
▌5. John Blake Jr. (DR)
▌6. Daniel C. Verplanck (DR)
▌7. Barent Gardenier (F)
▌8. James I. Van Alen (DR)
▌9. Killian K. Van Rensselaer (F)
▌10. Josiah Masters (DR)
▌11. John Thompson (DR)
▌12. David Thomas (DR), until February 17, 1808

▌Nathan Wilson (DR), from November 7, 1808

▌13. Peter Swart (DR)
▌14. John Russell (DR)
▌15. William Kirkpatrick (DR)
▌16. Reuben Humphrey (DR)
▌17. John Harris (DR)

==== North Carolina ====
(11-1 Democratic-Republicans)

▌1. Lemuel Sawyer (DR)
▌2. Willis Alston (DR)
▌3. Thomas Blount (DR)
▌4. William Blackledge (DR)
▌5. Thomas Kenan (DR)
▌6. Nathaniel Macon (DR)
▌7. John Culpepper (F), until January 2, 1808, and then from February 23, 1808
▌8. Richard Stanford (DR)
▌9. Marmaduke Williams (DR)
▌10. Evan S. Alexander (DR)
▌11. James Holland (DR)
▌12. Meshack Franklin (DR)

==== Ohio ====
(1 Democratic-Republican)

▌At-large. Jeremiah Morrow (DR)

==== Pennsylvania ====
There were four plural districts, the 1st, 2nd, & 3rd had three representatives each, the 4th had two representatives.
(15-3 Democratic-Republican)

▌1. Joseph Clay (DR), until March 28, 1808

▌Benjamin Say (DR), from November 16, 1808

▌1. John Porter (DR)
▌1. Jacob Richards (DR)
▌2. Robert Brown (DR)
▌2. William Milnor (F)
▌2. John Pugh (DR)
▌3. John Hiester (DR)
▌3. Robert Jenkins (F)
▌3. Matthias Richards (DR)
▌4. David Bard (DR)
▌4. Robert Whitehill (DR)
▌5. Daniel Montgomery Jr. (DR)
▌6. James Kelly (F)
▌7. John Rea (DR)
▌8. William Findley (DR)
▌9. John Smilie (DR)
▌10. William Hoge (DR)
▌11. Samuel Smith (DR)

==== Rhode Island ====
Both representatives were elected statewide on a general ticket.
(2 Democratic-Republicans)

▌At-large. Nehemiah Knight (DR), until June 13, 1808

▌Richard Jackson Jr. (F), from November 11, 1808

▌At-large. Isaac Wilbour (DR)

==== South Carolina ====
(8 Democratic-Republicans)

▌1. Robert Marion (DR)
▌2. William Butler Sr. (DR)
▌3. David R. Williams (DR)
▌4. John Taylor (DR)
▌5. Richard Winn (DR)
▌6. Joseph Calhoun (DR), from June 2, 1807
▌7. Thomas Moore (DR)
▌8. Lemuel J. Alston (DR)

==== Tennessee ====
(3 Democratic-Republicans)

▌1. John Rhea (DR)
▌2. George W. Campbell (DR)
▌3. Jesse Wharton (DR)

==== Vermont ====
(2-2 Democratic-Republican)

▌1. James Witherell (DR), until May 1, 1808

▌Samuel Shaw (DR), from September 6, 1808

▌2. James Elliott (F)
▌3. James Fisk (DR)
▌4. Martin Chittenden (F)

==== Virginia ====
(21-1 Democratic-Republican)

▌1. John G. Jackson (DR)
▌2. John Morrow (DR)
▌3. John Smith (DR)
▌4. David Holmes (DR)
▌5. Alexander Wilson (DR)
▌6. Abram Trigg (DR)
▌7. Joseph Lewis Jr. (F)
▌8. Walter Jones (DR)
▌9. John Love (DR)
▌10. John Dawson (DR)
▌11. James M. Garnett (DR)
▌12. Burwell Bassett (DR)
▌13. William A. Burwell (DR)
▌14. Matthew Clay (DR)
▌15. John Randolph (DR)
▌16. John W. Eppes (DR)
▌17. John Claiborne (DR), until October 9, 1808

▌Thomas Gholson Jr. (DR), from November 7, 1808

▌18. Peterson Goodwyn (DR)
▌19. Edwin Gray (DR)
▌20. Thomas Newton Jr. (DR)
▌21. Wilson C. Nicholas (DR)
▌22. John Clopton (DR)

==== Non-voting members ====
(no representation)

Indiana Territory. Benjamin Parke, until March 1, 1808

Jesse B. Thomas, from October 22, 1808

Mississippi Territory. George Poindexter
Orleans Territory. Daniel Clark

== Changes in membership ==
The count below reflects changes from the beginning of the first session of this Congress.

=== Senate ===
There were 5 resignations, 2 deaths, and 1 interim appointment. Neither party had a net change.

Senate changes
State (class)	Vacated by	Reason for change	Successor	Date of successor's formal installation (Note: When seated or oath administered, not necessarily when service began.)
Georgia (2)	Abraham Baldwin (DR)	Died March 4, 1807. Temporary successor appointed August 27, 1807, to continue the term.	George Jones (DR)	August 27, 1807
Connecticut (3)	Uriah Tracy (F)	Died July 19, 1807. Successor elected October 25, 1807, to finish the term.	Chauncey Goodrich (F)	October 25, 1807
Rhode Island (2)	James Fenner (DR)	Resigned September, 1807 to become Governor of Rhode Island. Successor elected to finish the term.	Elisha Mathewson (DR)	October 26, 1807
Vermont (1)	Israel Smith (DR)	Resigned October 1, 1807, to become Governor of Vermont. Successor elected to finish the term.	Jonathan Robinson (DR)	October 10, 1807
Georgia (2)	George Jones (DR)	Successor elected November 7, 1807, to finish the term, in place of a temporary appointee.	William H. Crawford (DR)	November 7, 1807
Ohio (1)	John Smith (DR)	Resigned April 25, 1808. Successor appointed to finish the term ending March 4, 1809.	Return J. Meigs Jr. (DR)	December 12, 1808
Massachusetts (1)	John Quincy Adams (F)	Resigned June 8, 1808, having broken with his party and lost re-election to the next term. Winner elected to finish the term, having already won election to the next term.	James Lloyd (F)	June 9, 1808
Pennsylvania (1)	Samuel Maclay (DR)	Resigned January 4, 1809, believing he would lose re-election. Winner was elected to finish the term, having already won election to the next term.	Michael Leib (DR)	January 9, 1809

=== House of Representatives ===
Of the voting members, there were 4 resignations, 4 deaths, and 2 vacancies from the beginning of this Congress. Democratic-Republicans had no net change and Federalists picked up 2 seats.

House changes
District	Vacated by	Reason for change	Successor	Date of successor's formal installation
South Carolina; 6th	Vacant	Levi Casey (DR) died before the end of the preceding Congress	Joseph Calhoun (DR)	Seated June 2, 1807
Delaware at-large	Vacant	James M. Broom (F) resigned before the beginning of this Congress	Nicholas Van Dyke (F)	Seated October 6, 1807
Massachusetts; 12th	Barnabas Bidwell (DR)	Resigned July 13, 1807, after becoming Attorney General of Massachusetts	Ezekiel Bacon (DR)	Seated September 16, 1807
North Carolina; 7th	John Culpepper (F)	Seat declared vacant January 2, 1808	John Culpepper (F)	Seated February 23, 1808
New Jersey at-large	Ezra Darby (DR)	Died January 27, 1808	Adam Boyd (DR)	Seated March 8, 1808
Indiana Territory at-large	Benjamin Parke	Resigned March 1, 1808	Jesse B. Thomas	October 22, 1808
Pennsylvania; 1st	Joseph Clay (DR)	Resigned March 28, 1808	Benjamin Say (DR)	Seated November 16, 1808
Massachusetts; 2nd	Jacob Crowninshield (DR)	Died April 15, 1808	Joseph Story (DR)	Seated May 23, 1808
New York; 12th	David Thomas (DR)	Resigned May 1, 1808, after becoming New York State Treasurer	Nathan Wilson (DR)	November 7, 1808
Vermont; 1st	James Witherell (DR)	Resigned May 1, 1808, after becoming judge of Supreme Court for Michigan Territory	Samuel Shaw (DR)	Seated September 6, 1808
Rhode Island at-large	Nehemiah Knight (DR)	Died June 13, 1808	Richard Jackson Jr. (F)	Seated November 11, 1808
Virginia; 17th	John Claiborne (DR)	Died October 9, 1808	Thomas Gholson Jr. (DR)	Seated November 7, 1808

== Committees ==
Lists of committees and their party leaders.

=== Senate ===
- Audit and Control the Contingent Expenses of the Senate (Chairman: John Quincy Adams)
- Engrossed Bills (Chairman: Andrew Gregg then Francis Malbone)
- Whole

=== House of Representatives ===
- Accounts (Chairman: Nicholas R. Moore)
- Affairs with Algiers (Select)
- Claims (Chairman: David Holmes)
- Commerce and Manufactures (Chairman: Thomas Newton Jr.)
- Conduct of Peter J. Bruin (Select)
- District of Columbia (Chairman: Joseph Lewis Jr.)
- Elections (Chairman: William Findley)
- Post Office and Post Roads (Chairman: John Rhea)
- Public Lands (Chairman: John Boyle then Jeremiah Morrow)
- Revisal and Unfinished Business (Chairman: John Clopton)
- Rules (Select)
- Standards of Official Conduct
- Ways and Means (Chairman: George W. Campbell)
- Whole

=== Joint committees ===
- Enrolled Bills (Chairman: Sen. James Turner)
- The Library (Chairman: N/A)

== Employees ==
=== Legislative branch agency directors ===
- Architect of the Capitol: Benjamin Latrobe
- Librarian of Congress: Patrick Magruder

=== Senate ===
- Chaplain: John J. Sayrs (Episcopalian), until November 10, 1807
  - Alexander T. McCormick (Episcopalian), elected November 10, 1807
  - Robert Elliott (Presbyterian), elected November 10, 1808
- Secretary: Samuel A. Otis
- Sergeant at Arms: James Mathers

=== House of Representatives ===
- Chaplain: Robert Elliott Presbyterian, until October 30, 1807
  - Obadiah B. Brown, Baptist, from October 30, 1807
- Clerk: John J. Beckley, until April 8, 1807 (died)
  - Patrick Magruder, from April 8, 1807
- Doorkeeper: Thomas Claxton
- Sergeant at Arms: Joseph Wheaton, until October 27, 1807
  - Thomas Dunn, from October 27, 1807

== See also ==
- 1806 United States elections (elections leading to this Congress)
  - 1806–07 United States Senate elections
  - 1806–07 United States House of Representatives elections
- 1808 United States elections (elections during this Congress, leading to the next Congress)
  - 1808 United States presidential election
  - 1808–09 United States Senate elections
  - 1808–09 United States House of Representatives elections
