= 1808 New York's 12th congressional district special election =

A special election was held in New York's 12th congressional district on April 26–28, 1808 to fill a vacancy left by the resignation, on February 5, 1808, of David Thomas (DR), who had been appointed New York State Treasurer. This election was held at the same time as the 1808 Congressional elections. As New York had redistricted in the meantime, Thomas' former district no longer existed as a separate district, but was now a part of the 6th district. The special election was held in the territory of the old 12th district

== Election results ==
Candidate	Party	Votes	Percent
Nathan Wilson	Democratic-Republican	2,358	57.4%
Asa Fitch	Federalist	1,753	42.6%

Wilson took his seat on November 7, 1808

== See also ==
- List of special elections to the United States House of Representatives
