= 1809 Pennsylvania's 1st congressional district special election =

A special election was held in Pennsylvania's 1st congressional district on October 10, 1809, to fill a vacancy left by the resignation of Representative Benjamin Say (DR) in June of that year.

Say, who had been elected in a special election the previous year, spent a little under a year in Congress, serving in the second session of the 10th Congress and the first session of the 11th Congress.

== Election results ==
Candidate	Party	Votes	Percent
Adam Seybert	Democratic-Republican	5,936	59.5%
Richard R. Smith	American-Republican	4,043	40.5%

Seybert took his seat November 27, 1809, at the start of the second session of the 11th Congress

== See also ==
- List of special elections to the United States House of Representatives
