= 1808 Vermont's 1st congressional district special election =

A special election was held in Vermont's 1st congressional district on September 6, 1808, to fill a vacancy caused by the resignation of James Witherell (DR) on May 1 of the same year, to accept a position as judge of the Supreme Court of Michigan Territory.

== Election results ==
Candidate	Party	Votes	Percent
Samuel Shaw	Democratic-Republican	3,202	56.7%
Nathan Robinson	Federalist	1,169	20.7%
Chauncey Langdon	Federalist	1,073	19.0%
Jonas Galusha	Democratic-Republican	136	2.4%
Others		63	1.1%

Shaw took his seat on November 8, 1808

== See also ==
- United States House of Representatives elections in Vermont, 1808
- United States House of Representatives elections, 1808 and 1809
- List of special elections to the United States House of Representatives
