= 1806 United States elections =

- ← 1804 1805 1806 1807 1808 → Midterm elections
- Incumbent president: ▌Thomas Jefferson (DR)
- Next Congress: 10th

Senate elections
- Overall control: Democratic-Republican hold
- Seats contested: 11 of 34 seats
- Net seat change: Democratic-Republican +1

House elections
- Overall control: Democratic-Republican hold
- Seats contested: All 142 voting seats
- Net seat change: Democratic-Republican +2

Elections occurred in the middle of Democratic-Republican President Thomas Jefferson's second term, during the First Party System. Members of the 10th United States Congress were chosen in this election. Neither chamber saw significant partisan change, with the Democratic-Republicans retaining a commanding majority in both the House and Senate.

== See also ==
- 1806–07 United States House of Representatives elections
- 1806–07 United States Senate elections
