= 1808 Connecticut lieutenant gubernatorial election =

- April 11, 1808
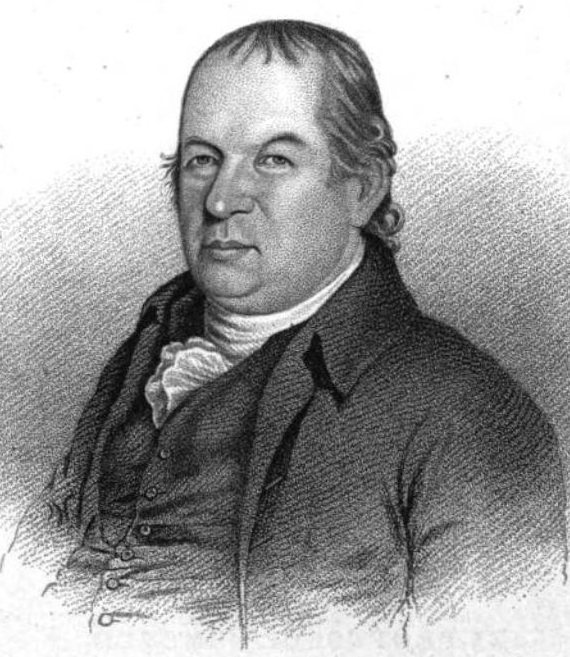

Nominee	John Treadwell	Asa Spalding
Party	Federalist	Democratic-Republican
Popular vote	11,254	5,337
Percentage	67.10%	31.80%
Lieutenant Governor before election
John Treadwell
Federalist
Elected Lieutenant Governor
John Treadwell
Federalist

The 1808 Connecticut lieutenant gubernatorial election was held on April 11, 1808, in order to elect the lieutenant governor of Connecticut. Incumbent Federalist lieutenant governor John Treadwell defeated Democratic-Republican candidate Asa Spalding in a re-match of the previous year's election.

== General election ==
On election day, April 11, 1808, incumbent Federalist lieutenant governor John Treadwell won re-election by a margin of 5,917 votes against his opponent Democratic-Republican candidate Asa Spalding, thereby retaining Federalist control over the office of lieutenant governor. Treadwell was sworn in for his eleventh term on May 12, 1808.

=== Results ===
Connecticut lieutenant gubernatorial election, 1808
Party	Candidate	Votes	%
Federalist	John Treadwell (incumbent)	11,254	67.10
Democratic-Republican	Asa Spalding	5,337	31.80
	Scattering	189	1.10
Total votes		16,780	100.00
Federalist hold			
