= 1808 North Carolina's 7th congressional district special election =

A special election was held in North Carolina's 7th congressional district on February 1, 1808. In the 1806 elections, John Culpepper (F) had defeated incumbent Duncan McFarlan (DR), but McFarlan contested the election, and, on January 2, 1808, the House Committee on Elections declared the seat vacant.

== Election results ==
Candidate	Party	Votes	Percent
John Culpepper	Federalist	2,578	56.5%
Duncan McFarlan	Democratic-Republican	1,947	42.7%

Culpepper was thus returned to the House, resuming his seat on February 23, 1808.

== See also ==
- List of special elections to the United States House of Representatives
