= 1808 Maryland gubernatorial election =

- November 14, 1808
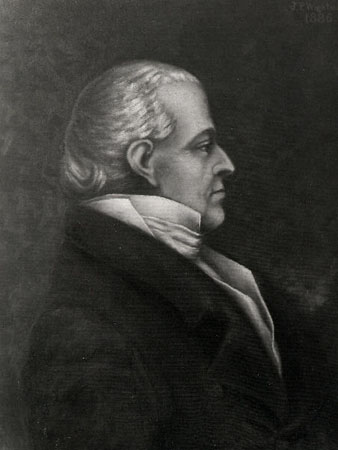

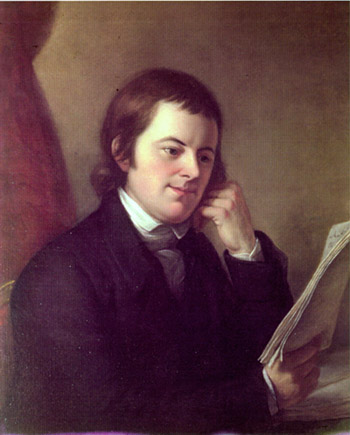
Nominee	Robert Wright	Thomas Johnson
Party	Democratic-Republican	Federalist
Popular vote	60	16
Percentage	72.29%	19.28%
Governor before election
Robert Wright
Democratic-Republican
Elected Governor
Robert Wright
Democratic-Republican

The 1808 Maryland gubernatorial election was held on November 14, 1808, in order to elect the governor of Maryland. Incumbent Democratic-Republican governor Robert Wright was re-elected by the Maryland General Assembly against Federalist candidates former governor Thomas Johnson, fellow former governor John Eager Howard and former United States senator Richard Potts.

== General election ==
On election day, November 14, 1808, incumbent Democratic-Republican governor Robert Wright was re-elected by the Maryland General Assembly, thereby retaining Democratic-Republican control over the office of governor. Wright was sworn in for his third term on November 21, 1808.

=== Results ===
Maryland gubernatorial election, 1808
Party	Candidate	Votes	%
Democratic-Republican	Robert Wright (incumbent)	60	72.29
Federalist	Thomas Johnson	16	19.28
Federalist	John Eager Howard	4	4.82
Federalist	Richard Potts	3	3.61
Total votes		83	100.00
Democratic-Republican hold			
