= John Morrow (Virginia politician) =

American politician

Member of the U.S. House of Representatives from Virginia's 2nd district
- In office March 4, 1805 – March 3, 1809
- Preceded by: James Stephenson
- Succeeded by: James Stephenson

Personal details
- Born: Unknown
- Died: Unknown
- Party: Democratic-Republican

John Morrow (birth and death dates unknown) was a U.S. representative from Virginia.

Morrow was elected as a Democratic-Republican to the Ninth and Tenth Congresses (March 4, 1805 – March 3, 1809).

== Electoral history ==
- 1805; Morrow was elected to the U.S. House of Representatives with 50.83% defeating Federalist James Stephenson.
- 1807; Morrow was re-elected unopposed.
- 1809; Morrow was defeated by Federalist Stephenson.

== Sources ==
- United States Congress. "John Morrow (id: M001005)". Biographical Directory of the United States Congress.

U.S. House of Representatives
Preceded by James Stephenson	Member of the U.S. House of Representatives from Virginia's 2nd congressional district 1805–1809	Succeeded by James Stephenson
