= Nathan Williams (politician) =

American politician (1773–1835)

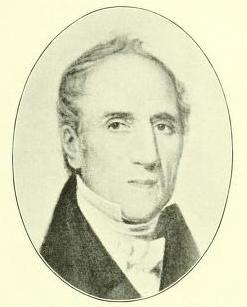

Member of the U.S. House of Representatives
- In office March 4, 1805 – March 3, 1807

Personal details
- Born: December 19, 1773 Williamstown, Province of Massachusetts Bay
- Died: July 25, 1835 (aged 61) Geneva, New York, U.S.
- Resting place: Forest Hill Cemetery; Utica, New York, U.S.
- Spouses: Mary Skinner (m. 1800; died 1807) Maria Watson (m. 1809)
- Children: 14
- Occupation: Lawyer; judge; politician; librarian
- Military career
- Conflicts: War of 1812; Second Battle of Sacket's Harbor

Nathan Williams (December 19, 1773 – September 25, 1835) was a United States representative from New York and the first lawyer to permanently establish a law practice in Utica. During the War of 1812 Williams volunteered for service and became a major in a company of militia at Sackett's Harbor.

== Biography ==
Born in Williamstown, Massachusetts, on December 19, 1773, he attended the common schools in Bennington, Vermont. After his parents property was "lost in the vicissitudes of the revolution", he moved with them to Troy, New York in 1786, studied law, was admitted to the bar in 1795, and commenced practice in Utica. He was the first lawyer to permanently establish a law practice in Utica. At the first term of the Common Pleas, which took place in 1798 in Oneida County, Williams was admitted to practice in the court, having been already admitted to the bar in Herkimer County. That same year he was admitted to the courts of Chenango County and was appointed district attorney of that county in 1802. He soon established a large law practice, however, rather than resorting to lawsuits he would instead often work with his clients in an effort to aid them and settle out of court. Williams married his first wife, Mary Skinner of Williamstown in 1800. The couple had four sons and Mary died in 1807. He then met Maria Watson of New York City, and the two married in 1809. They went on to have eight sons and two daughters.

== Career ==
He assisted in the establishment of the Utica Public Library, of which he was librarian for a number of years. He was president of the village corporation and president of the Manhattan Bank. He was district attorney for the sixth district from 1801 to 1813. He was elected as a Democratic-Republican to the Ninth United States Congress, holding office from March 4, 1805, to March 3, 1807. During the War of 1812 he used his influence and legal skills to uphold the cause of the government, and ultimately left his law practice and to march with a company of volunteers to Sacket's Harbor, then under command of his brother-in-law, General Jacob Brown, where Williams became a major in the company. Williams was a Regent of the University of the State of New York from January 28, 1817, to February 13, 1824; was also a member of the New York State Assembly (Oneida Co.) in 1818; and was District Attorney of Oneida County from 1818 to 1821. He was a delegate to the New York State Constitutional Convention of 1821. He was Judge of the Fifth Circuit Court from 1823 to 1834. He was appointed a clerk of the New York Supreme Court in 1834 and moved to Geneva, Ontario County. He was at one period counsel for the Oneida Indians, and the epithet they gave him does honor to the man, while revealing the justice of their discrimination; in their tongue he was the " Upright Friend."

== Death ==
Williams died at the age of 61 on September 25, 1835, in Geneva, NY. He was initially interred at the "Burying Ground," and re-interred at Forest Hill Cemetery in Utica. Williams obituary was prepared by friend and pupil Alexander Bryan Johnson, a prominent Utica banker and pioneering philosopher in the field of Semantics.

== See also ==
Celebrated Citizens of Oneida County - Judge Nathan Williams (1773-1835)

== Sources ==
- Bagg, Moses Mears (1877). The pioneers of Utica : being sketches of its inhabitants and its institutions, with the civil history of the place, from the earliest settlement to the year 1825, the era of the opening of the Erie Canal. Utica, N.Y. : Curtiss & Childs. OL 14034475M.
- Bagg, Moses Mears (1892). Memorial history of Utica, N.Y. : from its settlement to the present time. Syracuse, N.Y. : D. Mason.
- Cookingham, Henry J. (1912). History of Oneida County, New York : from 1700 to the present time. Vol. I. Chicago : S.J. Clarke Pub. Co.
- Durant, Samuel W. (1878). History of Oneida County, New York. Philadelphia: Evertts & Fariss.
- "Williams, Nathan, 1773 – 1835". Biographical Directory of the United States Congress.

U.S. House of Representatives
Preceded by Gaylord Griswold	Member of the U.S. House of Representatives from New York's 15th congressional district 1805–1807	Succeeded by William Kirkpatrick
