= 1808 Virginia gubernatorial election =

- December 9, 1808
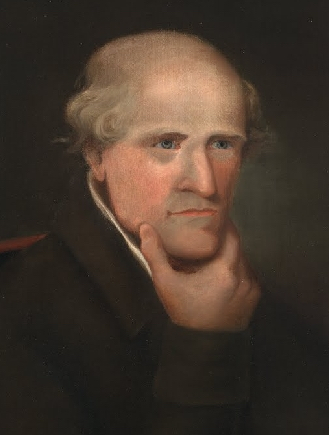

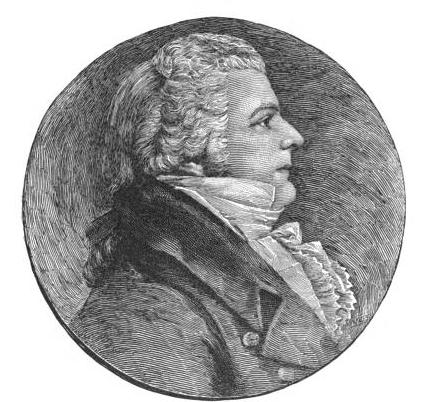
Nominee	John Tyler Sr.	Hugh Nelson
1st ballot	113	82
Governor before election
William H. Cabell
Democratic-Republican
Elected Governor
John Tyler Sr.
Democratic-Republican (Note: Lampi lists no parties for this election. Both Kallenbach and Kallenbach and Sobel and Raimo list Tyler as a Democratic-Republican during his tenure.)

A gubernatorial election was held in Virginia on December 9, 1808. The judge of the General Court of Virginia John Tyler Sr. defeated the speaker of the Virginia House of Delegates Hugh Nelson.

The incumbent governor of Virginia William H. Cabell was ineligible for re-election due to term limits established by the Constitution of Virginia. The election was conducted by the Virginia General Assembly in joint session. Tyler was elected with a majority on the first ballot.

== General election ==
1808 Virginia gubernatorial election
Candidate	First ballot	
Candidate	Count	Percent
John Tyler Sr.	113	57.95
Hugh Nelson	82	42.05
Total	195	100.00

== Bibliography ==
- Kallenbach, Joseph E.; Kallenbach, Jessamine S. (1977). American State Governors, 1776–1976. Vol. 1. Dobbs Ferry, NY: Oceana Publications.
- Lampi, Philip J. (2012). "Virginia 1808 Governor". A New Nation Votes. American Antiquarian Society.
- Sobel, Robert; Raimo, John (1978). Biographical Directory of the Governors of the United States 1789–1978. Vol. 4. Westport, CT: Meckler Books.
