= 1808 New Jersey's at-large congressional district special election =

A special election was held in New Jersey's at-large congressional district on March 8, 1808, to fill a vacancy left by the death of Ezra Darby (DR) on January 27, 1808

== Election results ==
Candidate	Party	Votes	Percent
Adam Boyd	Democratic-Republican	7,515	82.3%
Aaron Ogden	Federalist	884	9.7%
Ebenezer Elmer	Democratic-Republican	369	4.0%
Scattering		359	3.9%

Boyd took office on April 1, 1808

== See also ==
- List of special elections to the United States House of Representatives
