= William Kirkpatrick (New York politician) =

American politician

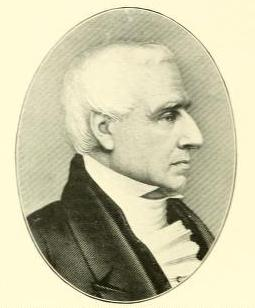
William Kirkpatrick

William Kirkpatrick (November 7, 1769 – September 2, 1832) was an American medical doctor and politician from New York.

== Life ==
Kirkpatrick was born in Amwell Township, Hunterdon County, New Jersey, he graduated from Princeton College in 1788, studied medicine at the University of Pennsylvania and commenced practice in Whitestown, Oneida County, New York in 1795. He moved to Salina (now a part of Syracuse), Onondaga County in 1806 and continued the practice of medicine. He subsequently became Superintendent of the Onondaga Salt Springs, and was elected as a Democratic-Republican to the 10th United States Congress, holding office from March 4, 1807, to March 3, 1809. He was again Superintendent of the Onondaga Salt Springs from 1810 to 1831, and died in Salina in 1832. Interment in Oakwood Cemetery (Syracuse, New York).

U.S. House of Representatives
| Preceded by Nathan Williams | Member of the U.S. House of Representatives from New York's 15th congressional district 1807–1809 | Succeeded by Peter B. Porter |
