= Ezra Darby =

American politician

Ezra Darby (June 7, 1768 – January 27, 1808) was an American politician who was elected for two terms as a U.S. representative from New Jersey, serving from 1805 to 1808.

== Biography ==
Darby was born in Scotch Plains, New Jersey. He held offices on the Board of Chosen Freeholders and served as assessor and justice of the peace from 1800 to 1804. He served as member of the New Jersey General Assembly from 1802 to 1804.

=== Congress and death ===
Darby was elected as a Democratic-Republican to the Ninth and Tenth Congresses and served from March 4, 1805, until his death in Washington, D.C., January 27, 1808.

He was also a slave owner.

He was interred in Congressional Cemetery in Washington, D.C.

== See also ==
- List of members of the United States Congress who died in office (1790–1899)

U.S. House of Representatives
| Preceded by Adam Boyd | Member of the U.S. House of Representatives from New Jersey's at-large congressional district March 4, 1805 – January 27, 1808 | Succeeded by Adam Boyd |
