= Duncan McFarlan =

American politician

Duncan McFarlan (died September 7, 1816) was a United States Democratic-Republican U.S. Congressman from North Carolina between 1805 and 1807.

Born in Laurel Hill, North Carolina in Scotland County, McFarlan engaged in agricultural pursuits. He served in the North Carolina House of Commons in 1792 and the North Carolina Senate in 1793, 1795 and 1800. At the 1788 Hillsborough Convention, he voted against the ratification of the U.S. Constitution. He was a convicted rapist.

McFarlan stood for election to Congress in 1802, but was unsuccessful; he ran again in 1804 and served one term, in the 9th United States Congress (March 4, 1805 – March 3, 1807). After his term in Washington, McFarlan returned to North Carolina and engaged in mercantile and agricultural pursuits, serving one further term in the state Senate, from 1807 to 1809. He died at Laurel Hill in 1816 and is buried in Laurel Hill Cemetery.

U.S. House of Representatives
Preceded by Samuel D. Purviance	Member of the U.S. House of Representatives from North Carolina's 7th congressional district 1805-1807	Succeeded by John Culpepper
