= 1808 Massachusetts's 2nd congressional district special election =

A special election was held in Massachusetts's 2nd congressional district on May 4, 1808, to fill a vacancy left by the death of Jacob Crowninshield (DR) on April 15, 1808.

== Election results ==
Candidate	Party	Votes	Percent
Joseph Story	Democratic-Republican	1,939	100%

Story ran unopposed and took his seat on December 20, 1808

== See also ==
- List of special elections to the United States House of Representatives
