= 1808 United States elections =

- ← 1806 1807 1808 1809 1810 → Presidential election year
- Incumbent president: ▌Thomas Jefferson (DR)
- Next Congress: 11th

Presidential election
- Partisan control: Democratic-Republican hold
- Electoral vote
- James Madison (DR): 122
- Charles C. Pinckney (F): 47
- 1808 presidential election results. Green denotes states won by Madison, burnt orange denotes states won by Pinckney. Numbers indicate the number of electoral votes allotted to each state.

Senate elections
- Overall control: Democratic-Republican hold
- Seats contested: 12 of 34 seats
- Net seat change: Federalist +1

House elections
- Overall control: Democratic-Republican hold
- Seats contested: All 142 voting members
- Net seat change: Federalist +22

Elections for the 11th United States Congress were held in 1808 and 1809. The election took place during the First Party System. In the aftermath of the Embargo of 1807, the Federalists picked up congressional seats for the first time since their defeat in the 1800 election. However, the Democratic-Republican Party maintained control of the presidency and both houses of Congress.

In the presidential election, the Democratic-Republican Secretary of State James Madison easily defeated the Federalist candidate, former diplomat and Constitutional Convention delegate Charles Cotesworth Pinckney of South Carolina. The incumbent Vice President George Clinton was reelected, making him the first vice president to serve under two different presidents.

In the House, Federalists won moderate gains, but Democratic-Republicans continued to dominate the chamber.

In the Senate, Federalists picked up one seat, but Democratic-Republicans retained a dominant majority.

== See also ==
- 1808 United States presidential election
- 1808–09 United States House of Representatives elections
- 1808–09 United States Senate elections
