= Reuben Humphrey =

American politician

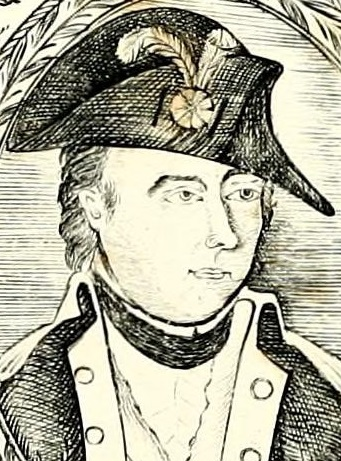
Reuben Humphrey, Congressman from New York

Reuben Humphrey (September 2, 1757 – August 12, 1831) was a United States representative from New York.

Born in West Simsbury, Hartford County, Connecticut on September 2, 1757, he completed preparatory studies and enlisted as a private in the Connecticut Militia for the Revolutionary War. He took part in several actions, including the Battle of Long Island, and received his commission as an officer. Humphrey continued his military service after the Revolution and was discharged as a major in 1796.

He held several local offices, including serving in the Connecticut House of Representatives in 1779, 1791 and 1793. He was Keeper of Newgate State Prison in Simsbury, Connecticut for five years.

Humphrey moved to Onondaga County, New York in 1801, and farmed in Marcellus and Onondaga. He was First Judge of Onondaga County from 1804 to 1807, and Town Supervisor of Onondaga in 1805. In 1806 he was elected as a Democratic-Republican to the 10th United States Congress, holding office from March 4, 1807, to March 3, 1809. He was not a candidate for renomination in 1808.

In 1810 he served again as Onondaga Town Supervisor, and he was a member of the New York State Senate from 1811 to 1815. In 1812 he served as Onondaga's Public School Inspector. He resumed farming, and died near Marcellus on August 12, 1831. He was interred in the Old Village Cemetery in Marcellus.

U.S. House of Representatives
Preceded by Uri Tracy	Member of the U.S. House of Representatives from New York's 16th congressional district 1807–1809	Succeeded by District eliminated
