= John Harris (New York politician) =

American politician

John Harris (September 26, 1760 – November 1824) was a member of the U.S. House of Representatives from New York, (cousin of Robert Harris) and was born at Harris Ferry, Pennsylvania (now Harrisburg).

He moved to Aurelius, New York, becoming the first Euro-American settler in 1789, and operated the first ferry across Cayuga Lake with partner James Bennett called the Harris-Bennett Ferry. He acted as an Indian interpreter and guide for white people who traded with and acquired land from upstate New York Indians, and opened the first dry goods store and tavern in Cayuga County, New York, in 1789.

In 1800 he was a partner in the group that constructed the first bridge across Cayuga Lake, further opening western New York to white settlers and securing routes for those traveling further west to Ohio, Michigan and beyond.

Harris was long active in the militia and was appointed the rank of Colonel in the New York State Militia in 1806. Also in 1806, Harris was elected to the US House of Representatives as a Democratic-Republican to the Tenth Congress. He served only one term, 1807 to 1809. He did not run for reelection and returned to his businesses in the Cayuga Lake area.

He commanded the One Hundred and Fifty-eighth New York Regiment in the War of 1812. He died in Bridgeport, New York, in November 1824. Interment in the local cemetery.

U.S. House of Representatives
Preceded by Silas Halsey	Member of the U.S. House of Representatives from New York's 17th congressional district 1807–1809	Succeeded by District eliminated
