= Samuel Shaw (politician) =

American politician

Member of the U.S. House of Representatives from Vermont's 1st district
- In office September 6, 1808 – March 3, 1813
- Preceded by: James Witherell
- Succeeded by: William Czar Bradley

Personal details
- Born: December 1768 Dighton, Province of Massachusetts Bay, British America
- Died: October 23, 1827 (aged 58) Clarendon, Vermont, U.S.
- Party: Democratic-Republican
- Spouse: Sally Campbell Shaw
- Children: Henry Shaw
- Profession: Politician, Physician

Samuel Shaw (December 1768 – October 23, 1827) was an American politician. He served as a United States representative from Vermont.

== Biography ==
Shaw was born in Dighton in the Province of Massachusetts Bay to John Shaw and Molly Hudson. He moved to Putney, Vermont, at the age of ten, and received limited schooling as a youth. He moved to Castleton in the Vermont Republic in 1789 and studied medicine for two years, and then commenced the practice of medicine in Castleton.

Shaw was elected to both the Vermont House of Representatives in 1800. He served from 1800 until 1807, and was Presidential Elector from Vermont in 1804. He was elected as a Democratic-Republican candidate to the Tenth Congress to fill the vacancy caused by the resignation of James Witherell. He was reelected to the Eleventh and Twelfth Congresses and served from September 6, 1808, to March 3, 1813.

He served in the United States Army during the War of 1812 as a hospital surgeon from April 6, 1813, to June 15, 1815, when he was honorably discharged. He was reinstated on September 13, 1815; appointed post surgeon April 18, 1818, and resigned on December 31, 1818.

== Family life ==
Shaw married Sally Campbell in 1788. Shaw's son Henry Shaw also served in the United States Congress as United States Representative from Massachusetts, serving from 1817 until 1821.

== Death ==
Shaw died on October 23, 1827, in Clarendon Springs. He is interred at Castleton Congregational Cemetery in Castleton, Vermont.

U.S. House of Representatives
Preceded by James Witherell	Member of the U.S. House of Representatives from Vermont's 1st congressional district 1808–1813	Succeeded by William Czar Bradley
