= 1808 Pennsylvania's 1st congressional district special election =

A special election was held in Pennsylvania's 1st congressional district on October 11, 1808, to fill a vacancy left by the resignation of Joseph Clay (DR) on March 28, 1808.

== Election results ==
Candidate	Party	Votes	Percent
Benjamin Say	Democratic-Republican	7,598	55.7%
Charles W. Hare	Federalist	6,046	44.3%

Say took his seat on November 16, 1808.

== See also ==
- List of special elections to the United States House of Representatives
