= John Russell (New York politician) =

American politician

Member of the U.S. House of Representatives from New York's 14th district
- In office March 4, 1805 – March 3, 1809
- Preceded by: Erastus Root
- Succeeded by: Vincent Mathews

Personal details
- Born: September 7, 1772 Branford, Connecticut Colony, British America
- Died: August 2, 1842 (aged 69) Cooperstown, New York, U.S.
- Party: Democratic-Republican
- Spouse: Elizabeth Williams (died 1838)
- Relations: Rensselaer Nelson (grandson)
- Children: Rensselear William Russell; Catharine Ann Russell
- Parent(s): Ebenezer Russell; Elizabeth Stork Russell

John Russell (September 7, 1772 – August 2, 1842) was an American medical doctor, merchant and a United States representative from New York.

== Early life ==
Russell was born in Branford in the Connecticut Colony on September 7, 1772. He was the second son of Federalist New York State Senator and Assemblyman Ebenezer Russell and Elizabeth (née Stork) Russell (a daughter of Capt. Moses Stork). His paternal grandparents were Mary (née Barker) Russell and John Russell.

He attended the public school, moved to New York State, studied medicine, and practiced a short time in Cooperstown, New York.

== Career ==
He was county clerk of Otsego County from 1801 to 1804, and was elected as a Democratic-Republican to the Ninth and Tenth Congresses, holding office from March 4, 1805 to March 3, 1809. While in Congress, Russell missed 53 of 393 roll call votes.

After he left Congress, he was a presidential elector on the DeWitt Clinton ticket in 1812. He engaged in mercantile pursuits.

== Personal life ==
Russell was married to Elizabeth Williams (1769–1838), daughter of Rensselaer Williams, a Justice of the Peace who was the librarian of the Trenton Library Company and was one of the founders of the Trenton Academy. Together, they were the parents of:

- Rensselaer William Russell (1803–1825), who attended the Schenectady Academy (today known as Union College) where he was a member of the Philomathean Society.
- Catharine Ann Russell (1805–1875), who married, as his second wife, United States Supreme Court Justice Samuel Nelson (1792–1873) in 1825.

His wife died on December 25, 1838. He died in Cooperstown on August 2, 1842. His interment was located at its Christ Episcopal Churchyard.

=== Descendants ===
Through his daughter Catharine, he was a grandfather of six, including Rensselaer Russell Nelson (1826–1904), a United States district judge of the United States District Court for the District of Minnesota.

U.S. House of Representatives
Preceded by Erastus Root	Member of the U.S. House of Representatives from New York's 14th congressional district 1805–1809	Succeeded by Vincent Mathews
