= David Thomas (New York politician) =

New York politician (1762–1831)

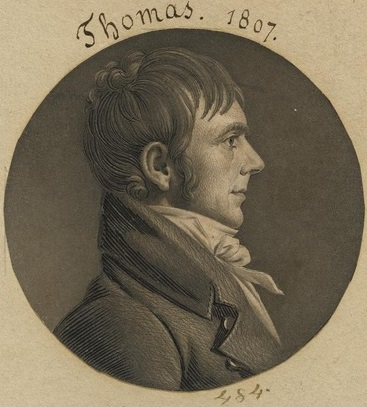
- 1807 engraving by Charles Balthazar Julien Févret de Saint-Mémin

New York State Treasurer
- In office February 18, 1812 – February 10, 1813
- Preceded by: Abraham G. Lansing
- Succeeded by: Charles Z. Platt
- In office February 5, 1808 – February 8, 1810
- Preceded by: Abraham G. Lansing
- Succeeded by: Abraham G. Lansing

Member of the United States House of Representatives from New York
- In office March 4, 1801 – May 1, 1808
- Preceded by: John Thompson
- Succeeded by: Nathan Wilson
- Constituency: 7th district (1801–1803); 12th district (1803–1808)

Personal details
- Born: June 11, 1762 Pelham, Province of Massachusetts Bay, British America
- Died: November 27, 1831 (aged 69) Providence, Rhode Island, U.S.
- Resting place: Evergreen Cemetery, Salem, New York
- Party: Democratic-Republican Party
- Occupation: Tavern owner Politician

David Thomas (June 11, 1762 – November 27, 1831) was an American politician. He served three full terms and one partial term in the United States House of Representatives (1801-1808), and three years as New York State Treasurer (1808-1810, 1812-1813).

== Life ==
Thomas was born and educated in Pelham, Massachusetts and was a veteran of the American Revolution. In 1777 he joined a militia unit which traveled from Massachusetts to defend Rhode Island from the British Army. In 1781 he joined the Fifth Massachusetts Regiment as a corporal, and later became a sergeant in the Third Massachusetts Regiment.

He moved to Salem, New York in 1784, where he owned and operated a tavern for several years. He was commissioned a captain in the New York State Militia in 1786 and rose to the rank of major general of the northern division of the militia in 1805.

He was a member of the New York State Assembly from Washington and Clinton Counties in 1794, and from Washington County from 1798 to 1800. He was town supervisor of Salem from 1797 to 1800, and a justice of the peace from 1798 to 1801, in 1804 and 1811.

Thomas was elected as a Democratic-Republican to the 7th, 8th, 9th and 10th Congresses, and served from March 4, 1801 to May 1, 1808, when he resigned.

He was New York State Treasurer from February 5, 1808 to February 8, 1810, and again from February 18, 1812 to February 10, 1813.

Thomas later moved to Providence, Rhode island, where he died on November 27, 1831. He was buried at Evergreen Cemetery in Salem, New York.

== Sources ==
- United States Congress. "David Thomas (id: T000163)". Biographical Directory of the United States Congress.
- Political Graveyard
- The New York Civil List compiled by Franklin Benjamin Hough (pages 35 and 309; Weed, Parsons and Co., 1858) (Google Books)

U.S. House of Representatives
Preceded by John Thompson	Member of the U.S. House of Representatives from New York's 7th congressional district 1801–1803	Succeeded by Josiah Hasbrouck
New district	Member of the U.S. House of Representatives from New York's 12th congressional district 1803–1808	Succeeded by Nathan Wilson
Political offices
Preceded by Abraham G. Lansing	New York State Treasurer; 1808–1810	Succeeded by Abraham G. Lansing
Preceded by Abraham G. Lansing	New York State Treasurer; 1812–1813	Succeeded by Charles Z. Platt
