= Nathan Wilson (politician) =

American politician (1758-1834)

Member of the U.S. House of Representatives from New York's 12th district
- In office November 7, 1808 – March 4, 1809
- Preceded by: David Thomas
- Succeeded by: Erastus Root

Personal details
- Born: December 23, 1758
- Died: July 25, 1834 (aged 75)

Nathan Wilson (December 23, 1758 – July 25, 1834) was a United States representative from New York. Born in Bolton, Worcester County, Massachusetts, he moved with his family to Greenwich, Hampshire County, Massachusetts, where he attended school. He served two enlistments in Massachusetts regiments during the Revolutionary War in 1777 and 1780 and moved to New Perth (now Salem), Washington County, New York. He enlisted as a private in the Sixteenth Regiment, Albany County Militia and was appointed by Governor George Clinton in 1791 adjutant in Washington County Militia Regiment. He was town collector in 1801 and 1802 and sheriff of Washington County from 1802 to 1806.

Wilson was elected as a Democratic-Republican to the Tenth Congress to fill the vacancy caused by the resignation of David Thomas and served from November 7, 1808, to March 4, 1809. He was justice of the peace from 1808 to 1816 and engaged in agricultural pursuits. He died near Salem in 1834; interment was in Evergreen Cemetery, Salem.

U.S. House of Representatives
Preceded by David Thomas	Member of the U.S. House of Representatives from New York's 12th congressional district 1808–1809	Succeeded by Erastus Root
