= 1796 United States House of Representatives elections in Pennsylvania =

United States House of Representatives elections in Pennsylvania, 1796
- October 11, 1796

All 13 Pennsylvania seats to the United States House of Representatives
	Majority party	Minority party
Party	Democratic-Republican	Federalist
Last election	9	4
Seats won	7	6
Seat change	▼2	▲2

Elections to the United States House of Representatives were held in Pennsylvania on October 11, 1796, for the 5th Congress.

== Background ==
Thirteen Representatives (9 Democratic-Republicans and 4 Federalists) had been elected in 1794. One Representative, Daniel Hiester (DR) of the 5th district resigned on July 1, 1796. His seat was vacant at the time of the 1796 election, and was filled in a special election held at the same time.

== Congressional districts ==
Pennsylvania was divided into 12 districts, one of which (the 4th) was a plural district, with 2 Representatives. These districts remained in use until redistricting after the census of 1800.

- The 1st district consisted of the City of Philadelphia
- The 2nd district consisted of Philadelphia County
- The 3rd district consisted of Chester and Delaware Counties
- The 4th district (2 seats) consisted of Montgomery, Bucks and Northampton Counties
- The 5th district consisted of Berks and Luzerne County
- The 6th district consisted of Northumberland and Dauphin Counties
- The 7th district consisted of Lancaster County
- The 8th district consisted of York County
- The 9th district consisted of Mifflin and Cumberland County
- The 10th district consisted of Bedford, Huntingdon and Franklin Counties
- The 11th district consisted of Westmoreland and Fayette Counties
- The 12th district consisted of Allegheny and Washington Counties

The counties that made up the 5th district did not border each other. That district was therefore made up of two separate pieces rather than being a single contiguous entity

Note: Many of these counties covered much larger areas than they do today, having since been divided into numerous counties

== Election results ==
11 incumbents (7 Democratic-Republicans and 4 Federalists) ran for re-election. Frederick Muhlenberg (DR) of the 2nd district did not run for re-election. Of the incumbents who ran for re-election, 9 (5 Democratic-Republicans and 4 Federalists) were re-elected. Overall, 7 Democratic-Republicans and 6 Federalists were elected, a net gain of 2 seats for the Federalists.

1796 United States House election results
District	Democratic-Republican			Federalist		
1st	John Swanwick (I)	1,507	51.3%	Edward Tilgham	1,432	48.7%
2nd	Blair McClenachan	1,182	60.2%	Robert Waln	795	39.8%
3rd	William Gibbons	1,143	47.1%	Richard Thomas	1,282	52.9%
4th 2 seats	Peter Muhlenberg	1,148	13.0%	Samuel Sitgreaves (I)	3,752	42.6%
4th 2 seats	John Richards (I)	1,081	12.3%	John Chapman	2,214	25.2%
4th 2 seats	Robert Lollar	604	6.9%			
5th	Joseph Hiester	1,538	43.2%	George Ege	2,028	56.8%
6th	John A. Hanna	898	74.3%	John Carson	255	21.1%
6th	Samuel Maclay (I)	56	4.6%			
7th				John W. Kittera (I)	1,679	95.6%
7th				William Webb	77	4.4%
8th				Thomas Hartley (I)	1,502	100%
9th	Andrew Gregg (I)	1,141	53.8%	James Wallace	168	7.9%
9th	William Irvine	678	32.0%	Thomas Kennedy	49	2.3%
9th	Robert Whitehill	86	4.1%			
10th	David Bard	1,581	45.1%	William M. Brown	862	24.6%
10th	Abraham Smith	1,062	30.3%			
11th	William Findley (I)	2,090	79.3%	James Findley	546	20.7%
12th	Albert Gallatin (I)	2,522	61.7%	John Woods	1,079	26.4%
12th				Thomas Stokely	486	11.9%
5th (special)	Joseph Hiester	1,553	43.2%	George Ege	2,039	56.8%

== Special Elections ==
George Ege (F) of the 5th district resigned in October, 1797 and was replaced in a special election held October 10, 1797

1797 Special election
District	Democratic-Republican			Federalist
5th	Joseph Hiester	1,259	100%	

With Hiester's election, the Democratic-Republicans gained 1 seat, increasing their majority to 8-5

John Swanwick (DR) of the 1st district died on August 1, 1798, and Samuel Sitgreaves (F) of the 4th district resigned on August 29, 1798. Special elections were held in those districts on October 9, 1798, the same day as the elections to the 6th Congress.

1798 Special elections
District	Democratic-Republican			Federalist		
1st	Samuel Miles	380	30.5%	Robert Waln	866	69.5%
4th	Robert Brown	5,109	62.1%	Jacob Everly	3,120	37.9%

Both also won election to the 6th Congress. The 1st district changed from Democratic-Republican to Federalist while the 4th district changed from Federalist to Democratic-Republican, leaving no net change in seats for the remainder of the 5th Congress.
