= 1800 United States House of Representatives elections in Pennsylvania =

United States House of Representatives elections in Pennsylvania, 1800
- October 14, 1800

All 13 Pennsylvania seats to the United States House of Representatives
	Majority party	Minority party
Party	Democratic-Republican	Federalist
Last election	8	5
Seats won	10	3
Seat change	▲2	▼2

Elections to the United States House of Representatives were held in Pennsylvania on October 14, 1800, for the 7th Congress.

== Background ==
Thirteen Representatives (8 Democratic-Republicans and 7 Federalists) had been elected in the previous election

== Congressional districts ==
Pennsylvania was divided into 12 districts, one of which (the 4th) was a plural district, with 2 Representatives. This was the last election which used these districts.

- The 1st district consisted of the City of Philadelphia
- The 2nd district consisted of Philadelphia County
- The 3rd district consisted of Chester and Delaware Counties
- The 4th district (2 seats) consisted of Montgomery, Bucks and Northampton Counties
- The 5th district consisted of Berks and Luzerne County
- The 6th district consisted of Northumberland and Dauphin Counties
- The 7th district consisted of Lancaster County
- The 8th district consisted of York County
- The 9th district consisted of Mifflin and Cumberland County
- The 10th district consisted of Bedford, Huntingdon and Franklin Counties
- The 11th district consisted of Westmoreland and Fayette Counties
- The 12th district consisted of Allegheny and Washington Counties

The counties that made up the 5th district did not border each other. That district was therefore made up of two separate pieces rather than being a single contiguous entity

Note: Many of these counties covered much larger areas than they do today, having since been divided into smaller counties

== Election results ==
Nine incumbents (8 Democratic-Republicans and 1 Federalist) ran for re-election, all of whom won re-election. The incumbents Robert Waln (F) of the 1st district, Richard Thomas (F) of the 3rd district, John W. Kittera (F) of the 7th district and Thomas Hartley (F) of the 8th district did not run for re-election. Ten Democratic-Republicans and three Federalists were elected, a net gain of 2 seats for the Democratic-Republicans.

1800 United States House election results
District	Democratic-Republican			Federalist		
1st	William Jones	1,698	50.2%	Francis Gurney	1,684	48.8%
2nd	Michael Leib (I)	2,744	77.8%	John Lardner	783	22.2%
3rd	Joseph Shallcroft	2,389	46.7%	Joseph Hemphill	2,732	53.3%
4th 2 seats	Peter Muhlenberg (I)	6,683	34.4%	Cadwallader C. Evans	3,028	15.6%
4th 2 seats	Robert Brown (I)	6,681	34.4%	John Arndt	3,010	15.5%
5th	Joseph Hiester (I)	3,018	83.2%	Roswell Wells	611	16.8%
6th	John A. Hanna (I)	4,295	74.6%	Samuel Maclay	1,460	25.4%
7th	John Whitehill	1,927	45.9%	Thomas Boude	2,274	54.1%
8th	John Stewart	2,263	54.8%	John Eddie	1,866	45.2%
9th	Andrew Gregg (I)	2,383	72.6%	David Mitchell	901	27.4%
10th	David Bard	967	46.4%	Henry Woods (I)	1,118	53.6%
11th	John Smilie (I)	2,182	100%			
12th	Albert Gallatin (I)	4,270	72.9%	Presley Neville	1,590	27.1%

== Special elections ==
There were three special elections following the October elections, one of which was for the outgoing Congress.

In the 4th district, Peter Muhlenberg (DR) was elected to the Senate on November 27, 1800, while in the 12th district, Albert Gallatin (DR) was appointed Secretary of the Treasury in May, 1801. Neither served in the 7th Congress, and special elections were held in both districts on October 13, 1801

1801 Special election results
District	Democratic-Republican			Federalist Party		
4th	Isaac Van Horne	4,687	100%			
12th	William Hoge	4,687	82.6%	Alexander Fowler	836	14.7%
12th	Isaac Weaver	154	2.7%			
