= 1798 United States House of Representatives elections in Pennsylvania =

United States House of Representatives elections in Pennsylvania, 1798
- October 9, 1798

All 13 Pennsylvania seats to the United States House of Representatives
| | Majority party | Minority party |
|---|---|---|
| Party | Democratic-Republican | Federalist |
| Last election | 7 | 6 |
| Seats won | 8 | 5 |
| Seat change | ▲1 | ▼1 |

Elections to the United States House of Representatives were held in Pennsylvania on October 9, 1798, for the 6th Congress.

== Background ==
Thirteen Representatives (7 Democratic-Republicans and 6 Federalists) had been elected in 1796. One seat had changed from Federalist to Democratic-Republican in a special election in 1797. Two more seats, one held by a Democratic-Republican and one by a Federalist, had become vacant in August, 1798, and were still vacant at the time of the 1798 elections

== Congressional districts ==
Pennsylvania was divided into 12 districts, one of which (the 4th) was a plural district, with 2 Representatives. These districts remained in use until redistricting after the census of 1800.

- The 1st district consisted of the City of Philadelphia
- The 2nd district consisted of Philadelphia County
- The 3rd district consisted of Chester and Delaware Counties
- The 4th district (2 seats) consisted of Montgomery, Bucks and Northampton Counties
- The 5th district consisted of Berks and Luzerne County
- The 6th district consisted of Northumberland and Dauphin Counties
- The 7th district consisted of Lancaster County
- The 8th district consisted of York County
- The 9th district consisted of Mifflin and Cumberland County
- The 10th district consisted of Bedford, Huntingdon and Franklin Counties
- The 11th district consisted of Westmoreland and Fayette Counties
- The 12th district consisted of Allegheny and Washington Counties

The counties that made up the 5th district did not border each other. That district was therefore made up of two separate pieces rather than being a single contiguous entity

Note: Many of these counties covered much larger areas than they do today, having since been divided into numerous counties. The boundaries of the districts are based on the counties' 1790 borders.

== Election results ==
There were two vacancies and 11 incumbents at the time of the 1798 elections. The two vacancies were filled by special elections held at the same time as the general election. Blair McClenachan (DR) of the 2nd district and William Findley (DR) of the 11th district did not run for re-election. The remaining 9 incumbents (5 Democratic-Republicans and 4 Federalists) ran for re-election. 8 Democratic-Republicans and 5 Federalists were elected, a net increase of 1 seat for the Democratic-Republicans over the 1796 elections.

1796 United States House election results
| District | Democratic-Republican | | | Federalist | | |
|---|---|---|---|---|---|---|
| 1st | Samuel Miles | 371 | 30.5% | Robert Waln | 865 | 69.5% |
| 2nd | Michael Leib | 1,129 | 56.5% | Anthony Morris | 870 | 43.5% |
| 3rd | John Pearson | 1,514 | 28.7% | Richard Thomas (I) | 3,760 | 71.3% |
| 4th 2 seats | Robert Brown | 5,372 | 31.1% | John Chapman (I) | 3,605 | 20.9% |
| 4th 2 seats | Peter Muhlenberg | 4,935 | 28.6% | Jacob Eyerly | 3,288 | 19.0% |
| 4th 2 seats | | | | Anthony Morris | 78 | 0.5% |
| 5th | Joseph Hiester (I) | 3,361 | 69.3% | Daniel Clymer | 1,492 | 30.7% |
| 6th | John A. Hanna (I) | 3,052 | 66.3% | Daniel Smith | 1,544 | 33.7% |
| 7th | William Barton | 407 | 22.5% | John W. Kittera (I) | 1,403 | 77.5% |
| 8th | | | | Thomas Hartley (I) | 3,857 | 85.4% |
| 8th | | | | Henry Slagle | 659 | 14.6% |
| 9th | Andrew Gregg (I) | 2,618 | 57.8% | James Armstrong | 1,912 | 42.2% |
| 10th | David Bard (I) | 935 | 20.3% | Henry Woods | 2,546 | 55.4% |
| 10th | | | | Thomas Johnson | 1,117 | 24.3% |
| 11th | John Smilie | 1,782 | 46.0% | William Todd | 1,265 | 21.3% |
| 11th | | | | James Guthrie | 826 | 21.3% |
| 12th | Albert Gallatin (I) | 3,926 | 58.8% | John Woods | 2,750 | 41.2% |
| 1st (special) | Samuel Miles | 380 | 30.5% | Robert Waln | 866 | 69.5% |
| 4th (special) | Robert Brown | 5,109 | 62.1% | Jacob Eyerly | 3,120 | 37.9% |

== Special election ==
Thomas Hartley (F) of the 8th district died on December 21, 1800. A special election was held January 15, 1801 to fill the vacancy.

1801 United States House election results
| District | Democratic-Republican | | | Other | | |
|---|---|---|---|---|---|---|
| 8th | John Stewart | 476 | 87.8% | Scattering | 66 | 12.2% |

Stewart had already been elected in the 1800 elections

== See also ==
- United States House of Representatives elections, 1798 and 1799
- List of United States representatives from Pennsylvania
