= 1794 United States House of Representatives elections in Pennsylvania =

United States House of Representatives elections in Pennsylvania, 1794
- October 14, 1794

All 13 Pennsylvania seats to the United States House of Representatives
	Majority party	Minority party
Party	Democratic-Republican	Federalist
Last election	8	5
Seats won	9	4
Seat change	▲1	▼1
- Results: Democratic-Republican Federalist

Elections to the House of Representatives were held in Pennsylvania on October 14, 1794, for the Fourth Congress.

== Background ==
Thirteen Representatives, 8 Anti-Administration (Democratic-Republican) and 5 Pro-Administration (Federalist), had been elected in the previous election on an at-large basis, the last time that Pennsylvania elected all of its representatives at-large. Ten incumbents (6 Anti-Administration and 4 Pro-Administration) ran for re-election.

== Congressional districts ==
For the 1794 elections, Pennsylvania divided itself into 12 districts, one of which (the 4th) was a plural district, with 2 Representatives. These districts remained in use until redistricting after the census of 1800.

- The 1st district consisted of the City of Philadelphia
- The 2nd district consisted of Philadelphia County
- The 3rd district consisted of Chester and Delaware Counties
- The 4th district (2 seats) consisted of Montgomery, Bucks and Northampton Counties
- The 5th district consisted of Berks and Luzerne County
- The 6th district consisted of Northumberland and Dauphin Counties
- The 7th district consisted of Lancaster County
- The 8th district consisted of York County
- The 9th district consisted of Mifflin and Cumberland County
- The 10th district consisted of Bedford, Huntingdon and Franklin Counties
- The 11th district consisted of Westmoreland and Fayette Counties
- The 12th district consisted of Allegheny and Washington Counties

The counties that made up the 5th district did not border each other. That district was therefore made up of two separate pieces rather than being a single contiguous entity

Note: Many of these counties covered much larger areas in 1794 than they do today, having since been divided into numerous counties

== Election returns ==
Ten incumbents (6 Democratic-Republicans and 4 Federalists) ran for re-election. The incumbents James Armstrong (F), from the 9th district, William Montgomery (DR) from the 11th district, and John Smilie (DR) from the 12th district did not run for re-election. Smilie would later return to the House in 1798, where he would remain until his death in 1812. Of the ten who ran for re-election, 6 (4 Democratic-Republicans and 2 Federalists) were re-elected. A total of 9 Democratic-Republicans and 4 Federalists were elected, a net gain of one seat for the Democratic-Republicans over the previous election.

Election results are unavailable from the 5th, 7th, 8th, and 11th districts, and are incomplete for the 9th.

1794 United States House election results
District	Democratic-Republican			Federalist			Other candidates		
1st	John Swanwick	1,240	51.2%	Thomas Fitzsimons (I)	1,182	48.8%			
2nd	Frederick Muhlenberg (I)	656	56.3%	Samuel Miles	510	43.7%			
3rd	Thomas Ross	571	31.8%	Richard Thomas	1,222	68.2%			
4th 2 seats	James Morris	1,648	20.2%	Samuel Sitgreaves	2,594	36.2%	James Barclay (party unknown)	195	2.4%
4th 2 seats	John Richards	1,635	20.0%						
4th 2 seats	Robert Lollar	1,072	13.1%						
4th 2 seats	Peter Muhlenberg (I)	661	8.1%						
5th	Daniel Hiester (I)								
6th	Samuel Maclay	1,882	46.0%	John Carson	438	10.7%			
6th	John A. Hanna	1,722	43.3%						
7th				John W. Kittera (I)					
8th				Thomas Hartley (I)					
9th	Andrew Gregg (I)			James Wallace					
9th	William Irvine (I)								
10th	David Bard	1,808	52.9%	James Chambers	519	15.2%			
10th	James McLane	1,090	31.9%						
11th	William Findley (I)								
12th	Albert Gallatin	769	33.1%	Thomas Scott (I)	643	27.7%			
12th	Daniel Hamilton	377	16.2%	Isaac Tichenor	256	11.0%			
12th	Hugh H. Brackenridge	140	6.0%	John Woods	197	5.9%			

In the 4th district, John Richards (DR) disputed the official returns (shown above) which showed himself in 3rd place and James Morris (DR) in 2nd. The Governor of Pennsylvania only issued certification for Samuel Sitgreaves (F). On July 10, 1795, before the House could act on the dispute, Morris died. The House voted Richards the legitimate winner of 2nd place, with the revised vote totals being 1,791 for Richards and 1,688 for Morris

== Special elections ==
Daniel Hiester (DR), re-elected to the 5th district, resigned on July 1, 1796. A special election was held on October 11, 1796 (the same day as the 1796 general elections) to fill the resulting vacancy. Hiester would later be elected to Maryland's 4th congressional district in 1800

1796 Special election
District	Democratic-Republican			Federalist		
5th	Joseph Hiester	1,553	43.2%	George Ege	2,039	56.8%

Joseph Hiester was a cousin of Daniel.

== See also ==
- United States House of Representatives elections, 1794 and 1795
