= 1798 Pennsylvania's 4th congressional district special election =

A special election was held in Pennsylvania's 4th congressional district was held on October 9, 1798, to fill a vacancy left by the resignation of Samuel Sitgreaves (F), who'd been appointed commissioner to Great Britain under the Jay Treaty. The election was held on the same day as elections to the 6th Congress.

== Election results ==
| Candidate | Party | Votes | Percent |
|---|---|---|---|
| Robert Brown | Democratic-Republican | 5,109 | 62.1% |
| Jacob Everly | Federalist | 3,120 | 37.9% |

== See also ==
- List of special elections to the United States House of Representatives
- United States House of Representatives elections, 1798 and 1799
