= William Rodman (Pennsylvania politician) =

American politician

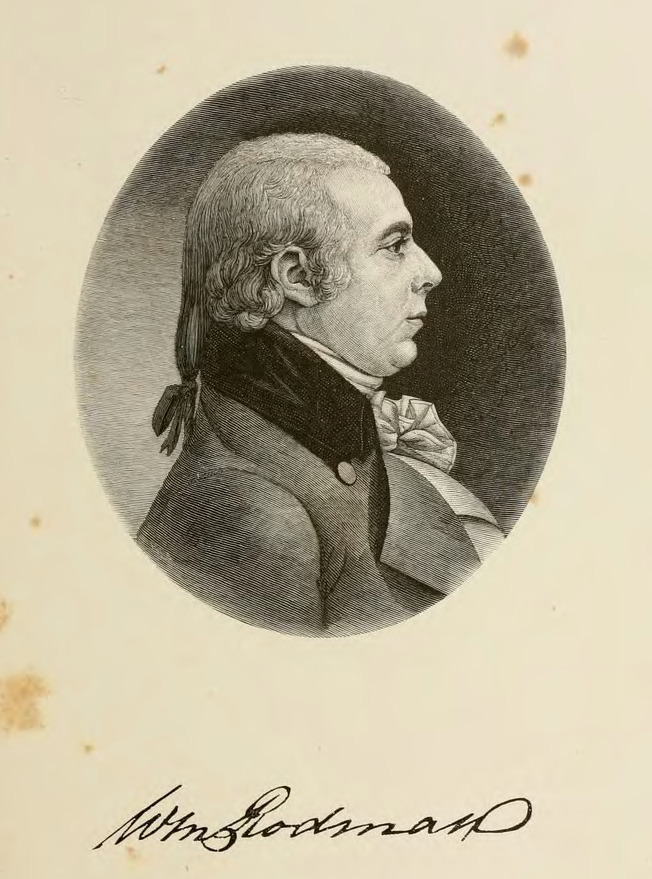
- Born: 7 October 1757; Bensalem Township
- Died: 27 July 1824; Bensalem Township
- Occupation: Politician
- Father: William Rodman

William Rodman (October 7, 1757 – July 27, 1824) was a member of the U.S. House of Representatives from Pennsylvania.

William Rodman was born in Bensalem Township, Pennsylvania, near Bristol, Pennsylvania. He served in the American Revolutionary War as a private and subsequently as brigade quartermaster. He commanded a company during the Whisky Rebellion in 1794. He was a justice of the peace from 1791 to 1800, and a member of the Pennsylvania State Senate for the 1st district from 1799 to 1803.

Rodman was elected as a Republican to the Twelfth Congress. He died at "Flushing" near Bristol and is interred at the St. James Episcopal Churchyard in Bristol, Pennsylvania.

== Sources ==
- United States Congress. "William Rodman (id: R000375)". Biographical Directory of the United States Congress.
- The Political Graveyard

U.S. House of Representatives
Preceded by Robert Brown; William Milnor; John Ross	Member of the U.S. House of Representatives from Pennsylvania's 2nd congressional district 1811–1813 alongside: Robert Brown and Jonathan Roberts	Succeeded by Jonathan Roberts; Robert Brown
