= Mathias Morris =

American politician

Mathias Morris (September 12, 1787 – November 9, 1839) was an American politician from Pennsylvania who served as an Anti-Jacksonian and Whig member of the U.S. House of Representatives for Pennsylvania's 6th congressional district from 1835 to 1839.

== Early life and education ==
Mathias Morris was born in Hilltown, Pennsylvania. He attended the public schools in Newtown and Doylestown, Pennsylvania. He studied law, was admitted to the bar in 1809 and commenced practice in Newtown, Pennsylvania.

== Career ==
He was deputy attorney general in 1819, and a member of the Pennsylvania State Senate for the 5th district from 1828 to 1833.

He elected as an Anti-Jacksonian to the Twenty-fourth Congress and reelected as a Whig to the Twenty-fifth Congresses. He was the chairman of the United States House Committee on Expenditures in the Department of State during the Twenty-fifth Congress. He was an unsuccessful candidate for reelection in 1838 to the Twenty-sixth Congress.

He died in Doylestown, Pennsylvania.

== Sources ==
- United States Congress. "Mathias Morris (id: M000984)". Biographical Directory of the United States Congress.
- The Political Graveyard

U.S. House of Representatives
Preceded by Robert Ramsey	Member of the U.S. House of Representatives for Pennsylvania's 6th district 1835-1839	Succeeded by John Davis
Pennsylvania State Senate
Preceded by William H. Rowland	Member of the Pennsylvania Senate, District 5; 1828-1833	Succeeded by John Miller
