= Frederick Conrad =

American politician (1759–1827)

Member of the U.S. House of Representatives from Pennsylvania's 2nd district
- In office March 4, 1803 – March 3, 1807
- Preceded by: Michael Leib
- Succeeded by: Robert Brown, John Pugh, William Milnor

Personal details
- Born: April 29, 1759 Worcester Township, Province of Pennsylvania, British America
- Died: August 3, 1827 (aged 68) Norristown, Pennsylvania, U.S.
- Party: Democratic-Republican Party

Frederick Conrad (1759 – August 3, 1827) was a member of the U.S. House of Representatives from Pennsylvania.

== Early life ==
Frederick Conrad was born April 29, 1759 near Worcester Township in the Province of Pennsylvania, the son of Pennsylvania-Dutch immigrants Henry and Magdalene Conrad.

== Employment ==
He was elected to the Pennsylvania General Assembly in 1798, 1800, and 1802. He served as paymaster of the Fifty-first Regiment of Pennsylvania Militia in 1804 and 1805.

== Political life ==
Conrad was elected as a Democratic-Republican to the Eighth and Ninth Congresses. He served as chairman of the United States House Committee on Accounts during the Ninth Congress. He was appointed justice of the peace 1807, prothonotary and clerk of the courts in 1821, and reappointed in 1824. He resided near Center Point, Pennsylvania, and was interested in agricultural pursuits. He moved to Norristown, Pennsylvania, and died there August 3, 1827. He is buried in Wentz's Reformed Church Cemetery in Center Point, Pennsylvania.

== Sources ==
- United States Congress. "Frederick Conrad (id: C000704)". Biographical Directory of the United States Congress.
- The Political Graveyard

U.S. House of Representatives
Preceded by Michael Leib	Member of the U.S. House of Representatives from Pennsylvania's 2nd congressional district 1803–1807; 1803–1807 alongside: Robert Brown; 1803–1805 alongside: Isaac Van Horne; 1805–1807 alongside: John Pugh	Succeeded by Robert Brown; John Pugh; William Milnor
