= Robert Ramsey (politician) =

American politician

If you're referring to the British composer, see Robert Ramsey (composer).

Robert Ramsey (February 15, 1780 – December 12, 1849) was born in Warminster Township, Pennsylvania, on February 15, 1780. He attended school in Hartsville, Pennsylvania. He was in the Pennsylvania General Assembly from 1825 to 1831 and in the 23rd United States Congress as a Jacksonian from Pennsylvania's sixth district from March 4, 1833, to March 3, 1835. He did not run for a second term to the 24th Congress, but did win reelection later in 1840 to the 27th Congress, still representing the sixth district, this time as a Whig. He served from March 4, 1841, to March 3, 1843. He once again did not run for reelection and instead left Congress to engage in agricultural pursuits. Ramsey died in Warwick, Pennsylvania, on December 12, 1849.

U.S. House of Representatives
Preceded by John C. Bucher	Member of the U.S. House of Representatives from Pennsylvania's 6th congressional district 1833–1835	Succeeded by Mathias Morris
Preceded by John Davis	Member of the U.S. House of Representatives from Pennsylvania's 6th congressional district 1841–1843	Succeeded by Michael H. Jenks
