= John Pugh (Pennsylvania politician) =

American politician

John Pugh (June 2, 1761 – July 13, 1842) was a member of the U.S. House of Representatives from Pennsylvania.

Pugh was born in Hilltown Township, Pennsylvania. He briefly served in the American Revolutionary War as a captain in the Pennsylvania militia. He engaged in agricultural and mercantile pursuits, and served as justice of the peace. He was a member of the Pennsylvania House of Representatives from 1800 to 1804.

Pugh was elected as a Democratic-Republican to the Ninth and Tenth Congresses. He was an unsuccessful candidate for reelection in 1808 to the Eleventh Congress. He was register of wills and recorder of deeds of Bucks County, Pennsylvania, from 1810 to 1821. He died in Doylestown, Pennsylvania and was buried in the Presbyterian Churchyard.

U.S. House of Representatives
Preceded by Robert Brown; Frederick Conrad; Isaac Van Horne	Member of the U.S. House of Representatives from Pennsylvania's 2nd congressional district 1805–1809; 1805–1809 alongside: Robert Brown; 1805–1807 alongside: Frederick Conrad; 1807–1809 alongside: William Milnor	Succeeded by Robert Brown; William Milnor; John Ross
