= Innis Green =

American politician (1776–1839)

Member of the U.S. House of Representatives from Pennsylvania's 6th district
- In office March 4, 1827 – March 3, 1831
- Preceded by: Robert Harris
- Succeeded by: John Conrad Bucher

Personal details
- Born: February 26, 1776 Hanover Township, Province of Pennsylvania, British America
- Died: August 4, 1839 (aged 63) Dauphin, Pennsylvania, U.S.
- Party: Jacksonian

Innis Green (February 26, 1776 – August 4, 1839) was a Jacksonian Democratic member of the U.S. House of Representatives from Pennsylvania.

== Biography ==
Innis Green was born in Hanover Township in the Province of Pennsylvania. He pursued an academic course, studied law, and was admitted to the bar and practiced. He was appointed associate judge of Dauphin County, Pennsylvania, by Governor William Findlay in 1818, and resigned October 23, 1827.

Green was elected to the Twentieth Congress and reelected as a Jacksonian to the Twenty-first Congress. After his time in Congress, he was reappointed associate judge of Dauphin County and served until his death in Dauphin, Pennsylvania, in 1839. Interment was in Dauphin Cemetery.

== Sources ==
- United States Congress. "Innis Green (id: G000412)". Biographical Directory of the United States Congress.
- The Political Graveyard

U.S. House of Representatives
Preceded by Robert Harris	Member of the U.S. House of Representatives from Pennsylvania's 6th congressional district 1827–1831	Succeeded by John C. Bucher
