= White Glass Company =

Company based in Ohio, US

White Glass Company was one of Ohio's early members of the glass industry. It existed from 1815 until approximately 1851.

== Beginning ==
Begun in Zanesville, Ohio at the South West corner of 3rd and Market Streets. It was chartered 13 May 1815 with Isaac Van Horne as President and his son in law Dr. John E. Hamm as Secretary. They made glass bottles with the Eagle and Masonic Symbols.

== Perspective ==
Some web sources have it as the earliest glass company in Ohio. However, there were clearly other earlier glass makers in Ohio, but few if any of these ever reached the incorporation stage. Much of the early glass industry was sole proprietorships, and the nature of early Ohio Industry was such that almost all of the really early glass makers left few records. Such was the nature of the craft that it was a rarity for the early glass makers to be able to read or write. However John Hamm and Isaac Van Horne, were unlike the average early Ohio glass manufacturers, both literate. They also had fairly deep pockets and were members of the State and local government. As such they went into the enterprise mostly in the way of the modern businessman, as entrepreneurs, rather than as workers.

The company was later known as The Ohio Valley Glass Company.

Several examples of the bottles manufactured at the Ohio Glass Company can be found on the web as of 2007.

== Sources ==
- Y Bridge City "The Story of Zanesville and Muskingum County, Ohio". Norris F. Schneider, The World Publishing Co., 1950. p. 82.
