= Jefferson Van Horne =

American infantry officer

- Born: 1802; Bucks County, Pennsylvania, United States
- Died: September 28, 1857 (aged 54); Albuquerque, New Mexico
- Burial place: Woodlawn Cemetery in Zanesville; 39.922°N 82.011°W
- Spouse: Mary S. Gilbert
- Military career
- Allegiance: United States
- Branch: United States Army
- Service years: 1823–1857
- Rank: Major
- Nickname: Founder of Fort Bliss
- Units: United States Military Academy; 3rd U.S. Infantry Regiment (The Old Guard)
- Conflicts: Seminole Wars (1840–1843); Military Occupation of Texas (1845–1846); Mexican–American War (1847–1848); Skirmish at Tolome (June 1847); Skirmish at Ovejas (June 1847); Skirmish of Ocalaca (16 August 1847); Battle of Contreras (19–20 August 1847); Battle of Churubusco (20 August 1847); Storming of Chapultepec (13 September 1847); Assault and Capture of the City of Mexico (13–14 September 1847)

Jefferson Van Horne (December 12, 1802 – September 28, 1857) was an American infantry officer. He was a veteran of the Seminole Wars, the Military Occupation of Texas, and the Mexican–American War. He is best known as the "Founder of Fort Bliss".

== Biography ==
Jefferson Van Horne was born in Bucks County, Pennsylvania in 1802 to Isaac Van Horne. His family moved to Zanesville, Ohio in 1810. Jefferson Van Horne was a cadet at the United States Military Academy at West Point from July 1, 1823 to July 1, 1827.

=== Early military career ===
Van Horne graduated from the United States Military Academy with a rank of thirteen in a class of thirty-eight. Upon graduation he was promoted to second lieutenant and assigned to the Third Infantry. As a second lieutenant he was on frontier duty at Jefferson Barracks Military Post, Missouri from 1827 to 1829; at Fort Leavenworth, Kansas in 1829; Jefferson Barracks Military Post, Missouri from 1829 to 1930; Natchitoches, Louisiana from 1830 to 1831, Fort Towson, Territory from 1831 to 1832 on Commissary duty; and transferring and subsisting Indians from 1832 to 1839. During this tour Van Horne was promoted to first lieutenant on April 1, 1836.

Van Horne fought in the Seminole Wars from 1840 to 1842, was promoted to captain on December 1, 1840, then stayed in garrison at Fort Stansbury, Florida from 1842 to 1843. He returned to Jefferson Barracks Military Post, Missouri in 1843. Van Horne took a sick leave of absence from 1843 to 1844. He returned to frontier duty at Fort Jesup, Louisiana, from 1844 to 1845. He participated in the Military Occupation of Texas in 1845 and 1846, and served on the recruiting service from 1846 to 1847.

Van Horne arrived in San Elizario Presidio on September 1, 1849, spending several days inspecting the fortifications of the presidio. He left San Elizario on September 4, stopping in Socorro and Ysleta on September 6, and finally arrived in El Paso on September 8, 1849.

== Personal life ==
Van Horne married Mary S. Gilbert in Zanesville, Ohio on November 28, 1854.

== See also ==
- Fort Bliss
- Isaac Van Horne, Jefferson Van Horne's father
- El Paso, Texas
