= James Kelly (congressman) =

American politician

Member of the U.S. House of Representatives from Pennsylvania's 6th district
- In office March 4, 1805 – March 3, 1809
- Preceded by: John Stewart
- Succeeded by: William Crawford

Member of the Pennsylvania House of Representatives
- In office 1793-1794; 1797-1798

Personal details
- Born: July 17, 1760 York County, Province of Pennsylvania, British America
- Died: February 4, 1819 (aged 58) York, Pennsylvania, U.S.
- Party: Federalist
- Education: University of Pennsylvania

James Kelly (July 17, 1760 – February 4, 1819) was a member of the United States House of Representatives from 1805–1809 for the Federalist Party, Pennsylvania.

== Biography ==
James Kelly was born in York County in the Province of Pennsylvania on July 17, 1760. He pursued classical studies, graduating from the University of Pennsylvania in 1782, where he would work as a tutor from then until 1783. After studying law, he was admitted to the bar and began practicing law in Philadelphia from 1785 until 1819. Before his election to Congress, he served in the Pennsylvania House of Representatives in 1793, 1794, 1797, and 1798. He was elected as a Federalist to the U.S. House and served there for two terms, from 1805 until 1809. After leaving Congress, he resumed his law practice in York, Pennsylvania, until his death there on February 4, 1819.

U.S. House of Representatives
| Preceded by John Stewart | Member of the U.S. House of Representatives from Pennsylvania's 6th congressional district 1805–1809 | Succeeded by William Crawford |
