= John Conrad Bucher =

American politician

Member of the U.S. House of Representatives from Pennsylvania's 6th district
- In office March 4, 1831 – March 3, 1833
- Preceded by: Innis Green
- Succeeded by: Robert Ramsey

Personal details
- Born: December 28, 1792 Harrisburg, Pennsylvania
- Died: October 15, 1851 (aged 58)
- Party: Jacksonian

John Conrad Bucher (December 28, 1792 – October 15, 1851) was a Jacksonian member of the U.S. House of Representatives from Pennsylvania.

He was born in Harrisburg, Pennsylvania, the son of John Jacob Bucher (1764–1827) and Susanna Margaret Horter (1774–1838). His father represented Dauphin county in the Pennsylvania Legislature, sitting at Lancaster, nine successive terms from 1803, and was later appointed by Governor Findlay an associate judge for the county of Dauphin.

He studied law, and was admitted to the bar and commenced practice in Harrisburg. He served as clerk of the land department of Pennsylvania in 1813. He was a member of the borough council of Harrisburg and a member of the board of school directors.

Bucher was elected as a Jacksonian to the Twenty-second Congress. He served as a trustee of Harrisburg Academy, Franklin College in Lancaster, Pennsylvania, and Marshall College in Mercersburg, Pennsylvania. He became an associate judge of Dauphin County, Pennsylvania, by appointment of Governor David R. Porter from 1839 until his death in Harrisburg, in 1851. He was buried at Harrisburg Cemetery, of which he was one of the founders.

In 1820, he married Ellen Isett (1797–1881). They had five children: Maria-Elizabeth, John-Conrad, Susan, Ellen, and Eliza-Isett.

== Sources ==
U.S. House of Representatives
Preceded by Innis Green	Member of the U.S. House of Representatives from Pennsylvania's 6th congressional district 1831–1833	Succeeded by Robert Ramsey
