= John E. Hamm =

American politician (1776–1864)

United States Marshal for the District of Ohio
- In office December 30, 1813 – 1821

United States chargé d'affaires to Chile
- Incumbent
- Assumed office 1831

Member of the Ohio Senate
- In office October 1827 – May 1831

Mayor of Zanesville
- Incumbent
- Assumed office 1815

Member of the Ohio House of Representatives
- Incumbent
- Assumed office October 1812

Personal details
- Born: John E. Hamm; May 31, 1776 Kent County, Delaware, U.S.
- Died: March 22, 1864 (aged 87) Zanesville, Ohio, U.S.
- Party: Democratic-Republican Party
- Education: University of Pennsylvania School of Medicine (M.D.)
- Profession: Physician, politician, diplomat, industrialist

Military service
- Allegiance: United States
- Branch/service: United States Army
- Years of service: c. 1812–1815
- Rank: Colonel
- Battles/wars: War of 1812: Battle of Lake Erie; Battle of the Thames

John E. Hamm, M.D. (May 31, 1776 – March 22, 1864) was an American US Army colonel, medical doctor and politician, diplomat, industrialist, and Marshall of the State of Ohio during the War of 1812.

== Early life ==
John E. Hamm was born May 31, 1776, in Kent Co., near Dover, Delaware. His father and grandfather were both members of the Kent Co. Delaware Committee of Observation and Inspection during the American Revolution.

He moved to Ohio in 1808, at the end of the 10 years required for his administration of his father's estate.

== Medical and military career ==
John Hamm earned his medical degree from University of Pennsylvania School of Medicine (which is now known as Perelman School of Medicine). He went on to practice medicine in both Dover Delaware and Philadelphia.

During the War of 1812, he held the rank of colonel and was in charge of the hospital that treated the wounded from the Battle of Lake Erie. He was in charge of the Army Hospital at Detroit. In 1813, he was appointed Regular Surgeon of 27th Regiment US Infantry under General William Henry Harrison. He was also at the Battle of the Thames.

He practiced and taught medicine in Zanesville, Ohio and Chillicothe, Ohio, and operated a pharmacy in Zanesville.

When the state capital was Zanesville, he became a member of the first Board for the Examination of Physicians and Surgeons in the State of Ohio.

== Democratic or Democratic-Republican politician ==
Both his father (John Hamm Sr.), who was a political adherent of Caesar Rodney, and his maternal grandfather Immanuel Stout were involved in politics and government. His uncle Jacob Stout was a one-term governor of Delaware.

He first became involved in Ohio politics when the state capital was at Chillicothe, and moved with it when the capital changed to Zanesville, then moved back to Chillicothe when the state capital returned there.

In October 1812, he was a member of the Ohio House of Representatives. In 1815, he was the mayor of Zanesville. He was a member of the Ohio Senate from October 1827 until May 1831, when he resigned to become US Chargé d'affaires to Chile. In 1836, he was the Jeffersonian candidate for Congress from the Zanesville area. He appears to have been a member of the Van Horne faction of the Democratic-Republican Party. He later was head of his own faction in Ohio politics.

His grandson Peter Graham "Bud" Black was the head of a faction of the Ohio Republican Party until 1948.

== Marshall of Ohio ==
Following his service in the War of 1812 (while the conflict was still ongoing), he was appointed Marshall of Ohio on December 30, 1813, under President Madison. His first task was to march the prisoners taken during the Battle of Lake Erie to Camp Bull (near Chillicothe, Ohio). As part of this job he was in charge of the taking of the US 1820 Census in Ohio. He served as Marshall of Ohio for eight years.

== Diplomatic career ==
He was appointed Minister to Chile under President Andrew Jackson. He negotiated the first US trade treaty with Chile, under which the US representative to that country was elevated to the rank of ambassador.

== Pioneer Ohio industrialist ==
In 1815, he and his father-in-law, General Isaac Van Horne, founded the White Glass Company of Zanesville, Ohio. This type of company was notoriously difficult to maintain as an enterprise, but White Glass Company survived well into (and in some form well beyond) the 1820s through several owners and under several names. The White Glass Company is perhaps best known for producing (now highly collectible) bottles.

== Sources ==
- Y Bridge City "The Story of Zanesville and Muskingum County, Ohio". Norris F. Schneider, The World Publishing Co., 1950.
- Who Was Who in America, Historical Volume, 1607-1896. Chicago: 1956
- Index of US Marshals 1789-1960. Virgil D. White, Waynesboro Tenn: National Historical Publishing Co., 1988.
- Hamm and Allied Families. Joseph M. Brumbley Sr., Wilmington DE: 1981, 380 pp.

Ohio House of Representatives
| New district | Representative from Muskingum County; 1812–1813; Served alongside: Stephen C. Smith | Succeeded by Joseph K. McCune; Stephen C. Smith |
