= Pennsylvania's 4th congressional district =

U.S. House district for Pennsylvania

Coordinates: 39°59′N 76°56′W

- Interactive map of district boundaries since January 3, 2023 (Montgomery County outlined in red)
- Representative: Madeleine Dean; D–Bala Cynwyd
- Population (2025): 794,429
- Median household income: $121,032
- Ethnicity: 76.1% White; 8.0% Black; 6.0% Asian; 5.8% Hispanic; 3.5% Two or more races; 0.5% other
- Cook PVI: D+8

Pennsylvania's fourth congressional district, effective January 3, 2023, encompasses the majority of Montgomery County and most of Berks County northeast of Reading in southeastern Pennsylvania. In the 2020 redistricting cycle, the Pennsylvania district pushed northwards, further into Berks County, effective with the 2022 elections. The area has been represented by Democrat Madeleine Dean since 2019.

== Recent election results from statewide races ==
Year	Office	Results
2008	President	Obama 58–41%
2008	Attorney General	Corbett 51–49%
2008	Auditor General	Wagner 58–42%
2010	Senate	Sestak 52–48%
2010	Governor	Corbett 51–49%
2012	President	Obama 55–45%
2012	Senate	Casey Jr. 57–43%
2014	Governor	Wolf 58–42%
2016	President	Clinton 55–41%
2016	Senate	McGinty 52–46%
2016	Attorney General	Shapiro 56–44%
2016	Auditor General	DePasquale 51–46%
2016	Treasurer	Torsella 55–43%
2018	Senate	Casey Jr. 62–36%
2018	Governor	Wolf 64–34%
2020	President	Biden 59–40%
2020	Attorney General	Shapiro 59–39%
2020	Auditor General	Ahmad 54–42%
2020	Treasurer	Torsella 56–41%
2022	Senate	Fetterman 60–38%
2022	Governor	Shapiro 66–32%
2024	President	Harris 57–42%
2024	Senate	Casey Jr. 57–41%
2024	Attorney General	DePasquale 53–44%
2024	Auditor General	Kenyatta 54–43%
2024	Treasurer	McClelland 54–44%

== History ==
From 2003 to 2013 the district included suburbs of Pittsburgh as well as Beaver County, Lawrence County, and Mercer County. The district had a slight Democratic registration edge, although it had voted for Republicans in several federal elections over the 2000s decade, including for President George W. Bush in 2000 and 2004, as well as Lynn Swann for governor in 2006. The heart of the district was a string of mostly white and middle class suburbs. Plum and Murrysville, two large and mainly residential boroughs, are the main towns in the suburban portion of the district that lies to the east of the city. Also included were the many suburban areas that make up northern Allegheny County and southern Butler County, Pennsylvania, including the larger communities of McCandless and Franklin Park, as well as several exclusive suburbs that have long been home to Pittsburgh's old money elite, including Fox Chapel and Sewickley. The northern suburbs had a generally moderate voting populace, which trends Democratic but makes up the swing vote, especially in races for national office. Further north, the district took on a different character. The suburban areas of Beaver County are somewhat less affluent and were heavily labor Democratic. The areas of Lawrence County and Mercer County had a more rural feel, but also had a union Democrat center within the city of New Castle.

This district changed drastically when Pennsylvania's new districts went into effect on January 3, 2013. Due to slower population growth than the nation as a whole, Pennsylvania lost a seat in Congress in reapportionment following the 2010 United States census, and this seat was effectively eliminated. Most of the 4th district was merged into a redrawn 12th district, and the previous 19th district was rebranded as the 4th. Thus from 2013 to 2018, the 4th district was located in south-central Pennsylvania and included all of Adams and York counties, as well as parts of Cumberland and Dauphin counties. During this time, the district was represented by Republican Scott Perry.

The Supreme Court of Pennsylvania redrew the state's congressional districts in February 2018 after ruling the previous map unconstitutional due to gerrymandering. The fourth district was reconfigured as a Democratic-leaning area to the northwest of Philadelphia for the 2018 election and representation thereafter. Geographically, it is the successor to the old 13th district, which was represented at the time by Democrat Brendan Boyle. Boyle, however, opted to run in the neighboring 2nd district, the geographic successor to the 1st district, represented by retiring incumbent Bob Brady. The bulk of Perry's representation, including York and Harrisburg, became part of a redrawn 10th district. Gettysburg and Adams County joined a new, heavily Republican 13th district, which was the successor to the old 9th district of retiring Congressman Bill Shuster. Areas to the south and east of York joined Lancaster in a redrawn, heavily Republican 11th district, the successor of Republican Lloyd Smucker's 16th district.

== Counties and municipalities ==
Berks County (32)
Alsace Township, Amity Township, Bally, Bechtelsville, Bern Township, Boyertown, Colebrookdale Township, District Township, Douglass Township, Earl Township, Exeter Township (part; also 6th) Fleetwood, Greenwich Township, Hereford Township, Kutztown, Laureldale, Leesport, Lenhartsville, Longswamp Township, Lower Heidelberg Township (part; also 9th), Lyons, Maidencreek Township, Maxatawny Township, Muhlenberg Township, Oley Township, Ontelaunee Township, Perry Township (part; also 9th), Pike Township, Richmond Township, Rockland Township, Ruscombmanor Township, Topton, Washington Township

Montgomery County (45)
Abington Township, Bryn Athyn, Cheltenham Township, Collegeville, Conshohocken, Douglass Township, East Norriton, Green Lane, Hatboro, Horsham Township (part; also 1st; includes part of Horsham CDP and Maple Glen), Jenkintown, Lansdale, Limerick Township, Lower Frederick Township, Lower Gwynedd Township, Lower Merion Township (part; also 5th; includes Bala Cynwyd and part of Merion Station), Lower Moreland Township, Lower Pottsgrove Township, Lower Providence Township, New Hanover Township, North Wales, Perkiomen Township, Plymouth Township, Pottstown, Rockledge, Royersford, Schwenksville, Skippack Township, Springfield Township, Towamencin Township, Trappe, Upper Dublin Township, Upper Frederick Township, Upper Gwynedd Township, Upper Merion Township (part; also 5th; includes part of King of Prussia), Upper Moreland Township, Upper Pottsgrove Township, Upper Providence Township, Upper Salford Township, West Conshohocken, West Norriton Township, West Pottsgrove Township, Whitemarsh Township, Whitpain Township, Worcester Township

== List of members representing the district ==
The district was organized from the Pennsylvania's at-large congressional district in 1791

=== 1791–1793: one seat ===
Representative	Party	Years	Cong ress	Electoral history
District first established March 4, 1791
Daniel Hiester (Montgomery County)	Anti-Administration	March 4, 1791 – March 3, 1793	2nd	Redistricted from the at-large district and re-elected in 1791. Redistricted to the at-large district.

=== 1795–1813: two seats ===
Cong ress	Years	Seat A			Seat B		
Cong ress	Years	Representative	Party	Electoral history	Representative	Party	Electoral history
4th	March 4, 1795 – March 3, 1797	Samuel Sitgreaves (Easton)	Federalist	Elected in 1794. Re-elected in 1796. Resigned.	John Richards (New Hanover)	Democratic-Republican	Elected in 1794. Lost re-election.
5th	March 4, 1797 – August 29, 1798	Samuel Sitgreaves (Easton)	Federalist	Elected in 1794. Re-elected in 1796. Resigned.	John Chapman (Upper Makefield)	Federalist	Elected in 1796. Lost re-election.
5th	August 29, 1798 – December 4, 1798	Vacant			John Chapman (Upper Makefield)	Federalist	Elected in 1796. Lost re-election.
5th	December 4, 1798 – March 3, 1799	Robert Brown (East Allen)	Democratic-Republican	Elected October 9, 1798, to finish Sitgreaves's term and seated December 4, 1798. Also elected October 9, 1798, to the next term. Re-elected in 1800. Redistricted to the 2nd district.	John Chapman (Upper Makefield)	Federalist	Elected in 1796. Lost re-election.
6th	March 4, 1799 – March 3, 1801	Robert Brown (East Allen)	Democratic-Republican	Elected October 9, 1798, to finish Sitgreaves's term and seated December 4, 1798. Also elected October 9, 1798, to the next term. Re-elected in 1800. Redistricted to the 2nd district.	Peter Muhlenberg (Montgomery County)	Democratic-Republican	Elected in 1798. Elected in 1800 but declined the seat when elected U.S. Senator.
7th	March 4, 1801 – December 7, 1801	Robert Brown (East Allen)	Democratic-Republican	Elected October 9, 1798, to finish Sitgreaves's term and seated December 4, 1798. Also elected October 9, 1798, to the next term. Re-elected in 1800. Redistricted to the 2nd district.	Vacant		
7th	December 7, 1801 – March 3, 1803	Robert Brown (East Allen)	Democratic-Republican	Elected October 9, 1798, to finish Sitgreaves's term and seated December 4, 1798. Also elected October 9, 1798, to the next term. Re-elected in 1800. Redistricted to the 2nd district.	Isaac Van Horne (Solebury Township)	Democratic-Republican	Elected October 13, 1801, to finish Muhlenberg's term and seated December 7, 1801. Redistricted to the 2nd district.
8th	March 4, 1803 – March 3, 1805	John A. Hanna (Harrisburg)	Democratic-Republican	Redistricted from the 6th district and re-elected in 1802. Died.	David Bard (Frankstown)	Democratic-Republican	Elected in 1802. Re-elected in 1804. Re-elected in 1806. Re-elected in 1808. Re-elected in 1810. Redistricted to the 9th district.
9th	March 4, 1805 – July 23, 1805	John A. Hanna (Harrisburg)	Democratic-Republican	Redistricted from the 6th district and re-elected in 1802. Died.	David Bard (Frankstown)	Democratic-Republican	Elected in 1802. Re-elected in 1804. Re-elected in 1806. Re-elected in 1808. Re-elected in 1810. Redistricted to the 9th district.
9th	July 23, 1805 – December 2, 1805	Vacant			David Bard (Frankstown)	Democratic-Republican	Elected in 1802. Re-elected in 1804. Re-elected in 1806. Re-elected in 1808. Re-elected in 1810. Redistricted to the 9th district.
9th	December 2, 1805 – March 3, 1807	Robert Whitehill (Camp Hill)	Democratic-Republican	Elected October 8, 1805, to finish Hanna's term and seated December 2, 1805. Re-elected in 1806. Re-elected in 1808. Re-elected in 1810. Redistricted to the 5th district.	David Bard (Frankstown)	Democratic-Republican	Elected in 1802. Re-elected in 1804. Re-elected in 1806. Re-elected in 1808. Re-elected in 1810. Redistricted to the 9th district.
10th	March 4, 1807; March 3, 1809	Robert Whitehill (Camp Hill)	Democratic-Republican	Elected October 8, 1805, to finish Hanna's term and seated December 2, 1805. Re-elected in 1806. Re-elected in 1808. Re-elected in 1810. Redistricted to the 5th district.	David Bard (Frankstown)	Democratic-Republican	Elected in 1802. Re-elected in 1804. Re-elected in 1806. Re-elected in 1808. Re-elected in 1810. Redistricted to the 9th district.
11th	March 4, 1809; March 3, 1811	Robert Whitehill (Camp Hill)	Democratic-Republican	Elected October 8, 1805, to finish Hanna's term and seated December 2, 1805. Re-elected in 1806. Re-elected in 1808. Re-elected in 1810. Redistricted to the 5th district.	David Bard (Frankstown)	Democratic-Republican	Elected in 1802. Re-elected in 1804. Re-elected in 1806. Re-elected in 1808. Re-elected in 1810. Redistricted to the 9th district.
12th	March 4, 1811; March 3, 1813	Robert Whitehill (Camp Hill)	Democratic-Republican	Elected October 8, 1805, to finish Hanna's term and seated December 2, 1805. Re-elected in 1806. Re-elected in 1808. Re-elected in 1810. Redistricted to the 5th district.	David Bard (Frankstown)	Democratic-Republican	Elected in 1802. Re-elected in 1804. Re-elected in 1806. Re-elected in 1808. Re-elected in 1810. Redistricted to the 9th district.

=== 1813–1823: one seat ===
Representative	Party	Years	Cong ress	Electoral history
Hugh Glasgow (York)	Democratic-Republican	March 4, 1813 – March 3, 1817	13th 14th	Elected in 1812. Re-elected in 1814. Retired.
Jacob Spangler (York)	Democratic-Republican	March 4, 1817 – April 20, 1818	15th	Elected in 1816. Resigned to become Surveyor-General of Pennsylvania.
Vacant		April 20, 1818 – November 16, 1818	15th	
Jacob Hostetter (Hanover)	Democratic-Republican	November 16, 1818 – March 3, 1819	15th	Elected in 1818 to finish Spangler's term and seated November 16, 1818. Also elected in 1818 to the next term. Lost re-election.
Jacob Hostetter (Hanover)	Democratic-Republican	March 4, 1819 – March 3, 1821	16th	Elected in 1818 to finish Spangler's term and seated November 16, 1818. Also elected in 1818 to the next term. Lost re-election.
James S. Mitchell (Rossville)	Democratic-Republican	March 4, 1821 – March 3, 1823	17th	Elected in 1820. Redistricted to the 10th district.

=== 1823–1843: three seats ===
Cong ress	Years	Seat A			Seat B			Seat C		
Cong ress	Years	Representative	Party	Electoral history	Representative	Party	Electoral history	Representative	Party	Electoral history
18th	March 4, 1823 – March 3, 1825	James Buchanan (Lancaster)	Jackson Federalist	Redistricted from the 3rd district and re-elected in 1822. Re-elected in 1824. Re-elected in 1826. Re-elected in 1828. Retired.	Samuel Edwards (Chester)	Jackson Federalist	Redistricted from the 1st district and re-elected in 1822. Re-elected in 1824. Retired.	Isaac Wayne (Warren)	Jackson Federalist	[data missing]
19th	March 4, 1825 – March 3, 1827	James Buchanan (Lancaster)	Jacksonian	Redistricted from the 3rd district and re-elected in 1822. Re-elected in 1824. Re-elected in 1826. Re-elected in 1828. Retired.	Samuel Edwards (Chester)	Jacksonian	Redistricted from the 1st district and re-elected in 1822. Re-elected in 1824. Retired.	Charles Miner (West Chester)	Anti-Jacksonian	Elected in 1824. Re-elected in 1826. Retired.
20th	March 4, 1827 – March 3, 1829	James Buchanan (Lancaster)	Jacksonian	Redistricted from the 3rd district and re-elected in 1822. Re-elected in 1824. Re-elected in 1826. Re-elected in 1828. Retired.	Samuel Anderson (Providence)	Anti-Jacksonian	Elected in 1826. Returned to Pennsylvania House of Representatives.	Charles Miner (West Chester)	Anti-Jacksonian	Elected in 1824. Re-elected in 1826. Retired.
21st	March 4, 1829 – March 3, 1831	James Buchanan (Lancaster)	Jacksonian	Redistricted from the 3rd district and re-elected in 1822. Re-elected in 1824. Re-elected in 1826. Re-elected in 1828. Retired.	George G. Leiper (Leiperville)	Jacksonian	Elected in 1828. Retired.	Joshua Evans Jr. (Paoli)	Jacksonian	Elected in 1828. Re-elected in 1830. Retired.
22nd	March 4, 1831 – March 3, 1833	William Hiester (New Holland)	Anti-Masonic	Elected in 1830. Re-elected in 1832. Re-elected in 1834. Retired.	David Potts Jr. (Pottstown)	Anti-Masonic	Elected in 1830. Re-elected in 1832. Re-elected in 1834. Re-elected in 1836. Retired.	Joshua Evans Jr. (Paoli)	Jacksonian	Elected in 1828. Re-elected in 1830. Retired.
23rd	March 4, 1833 – March 3, 1835	William Hiester (New Holland)	Anti-Masonic	Elected in 1830. Re-elected in 1832. Re-elected in 1834. Retired.	David Potts Jr. (Pottstown)	Anti-Masonic	Elected in 1830. Re-elected in 1832. Re-elected in 1834. Re-elected in 1836. Retired.	Edward Darlington (Chester)	Anti-Masonic	Elected in 1832. Re-elected in 1834. Re-elected in 1836. Retired.
24th	March 4, 1835 – March 3, 1837	William Hiester (New Holland)	Anti-Masonic	Elected in 1830. Re-elected in 1832. Re-elected in 1834. Retired.	David Potts Jr. (Pottstown)	Anti-Masonic	Elected in 1830. Re-elected in 1832. Re-elected in 1834. Re-elected in 1836. Retired.	Edward Darlington (Chester)	Anti-Masonic	Elected in 1832. Re-elected in 1834. Re-elected in 1836. Retired.
25th	March 4, 1837 – March 3, 1839	Edward Davies (Churchtown)	Anti-Masonic	Elected in 1836. Re-elected in 1838. [data missing]	David Potts Jr. (Pottstown)	Anti-Masonic	Elected in 1830. Re-elected in 1832. Re-elected in 1834. Re-elected in 1836. Retired.	Edward Darlington (Chester)	Anti-Masonic	Elected in 1832. Re-elected in 1834. Re-elected in 1836. Retired.
26th	March 4, 1839 – March 3, 1841	Edward Davies (Churchtown)	Anti-Masonic	Elected in 1836. Re-elected in 1838. [data missing]	Francis James (West Chester)	Anti-Masonic	Elected in 1838. Re-elected in 1840. [data missing]	John Edwards (Ivy Mills)	Anti-Masonic	Elected in 1838. Re-elected in 1840. [data missing]
27th	March 4, 1841 – March 3, 1843	Jeremiah Brown (Goshen)	Whig	Elected in 1840. Redistricted to the 8th district.	Francis James (West Chester)	Whig	Elected in 1838. Re-elected in 1840. [data missing]	John Edwards (Ivy Mills)	Whig	Elected in 1838. Re-elected in 1840. [data missing]

=== 1843–present: one seat ===
Member	Party	Years	Cong ress	Electoral history	District location
Charles J. Ingersoll (Philadelphia)	Democratic	March 4, 1843 – March 3, 1849	28th 29th 30th	Redistricted from the 3rd district and re-elected in 1843. Re-elected in 1844. Re-elected in 1846. Retired.	1843–1853 [data missing]
John Robbins (Kensington)	Democratic	March 4, 1849 – March 3, 1853	31st 32nd	Elected in 1848. Re-elected in 1850. Redistricted to the 3rd district.	1843–1853 [data missing]
William H. Witte (Philadelphia)	Democratic	March 4, 1853 – March 3, 1855	33rd	Elected in 1852. Retired.	1853–1863 {{Data
Jacob Broom (Philadelphia)	American	March 4, 1855 – March 3, 1857	34th	Elected in 1854. Lost renomination.	1853–1863 {{Data
Henry M. Phillips (Philadelphia)	Democratic	March 4, 1857 – March 3, 1859	35th	Elected in 1856. Lost re-election.	1853–1863 {{Data
William Millward (Philadelphia)	Republican	March 4, 1859 – March 3, 1861	36th	Elected in 1858. Lost renomination.	1853–1863 {{Data
William D. Kelley (Philadelphia)	Republican	March 4, 1861 – January 9, 1890	37th 38th 39th 40th 41st 42nd 43rd 44th 45th 46th 47th 48th 49th 50th 51st	Elected in 1860. Re-elected in 1862. Re-elected in 1864. Re-elected in 1866. Re-elected in 1868. Re-elected in 1870. Re-elected in 1872. Re-elected in 1874. Re-elected in 1876. Re-elected in 1878. Re-elected in 1880. Re-elected in 1882. Re-elected in 1884. Re-elected in 1886. Re-elected in 1888. Died.	
William D. Kelley (Philadelphia)	Republican	March 4, 1861 – January 9, 1890	37th 38th 39th 40th 41st 42nd 43rd 44th 45th 46th 47th 48th 49th 50th 51st	Elected in 1860. Re-elected in 1862. Re-elected in 1864. Re-elected in 1866. Re-elected in 1868. Re-elected in 1870. Re-elected in 1872. Re-elected in 1874. Re-elected in 1876. Re-elected in 1878. Re-elected in 1880. Re-elected in 1882. Re-elected in 1884. Re-elected in 1886. Re-elected in 1888. Died.	1863–1869 [data missing]
William D. Kelley (Philadelphia)	Republican	March 4, 1861 – January 9, 1890	37th 38th 39th 40th 41st 42nd 43rd 44th 45th 46th 47th 48th 49th 50th 51st	Elected in 1860. Re-elected in 1862. Re-elected in 1864. Re-elected in 1866. Re-elected in 1868. Re-elected in 1870. Re-elected in 1872. Re-elected in 1874. Re-elected in 1876. Re-elected in 1878. Re-elected in 1880. Re-elected in 1882. Re-elected in 1884. Re-elected in 1886. Re-elected in 1888. Died.	1869–1873 [data missing]
William D. Kelley (Philadelphia)	Republican	March 4, 1861 – January 9, 1890	37th 38th 39th 40th 41st 42nd 43rd 44th 45th 46th 47th 48th 49th 50th 51st	Elected in 1860. Re-elected in 1862. Re-elected in 1864. Re-elected in 1866. Re-elected in 1868. Re-elected in 1870. Re-elected in 1872. Re-elected in 1874. Re-elected in 1876. Re-elected in 1878. Re-elected in 1880. Re-elected in 1882. Re-elected in 1884. Re-elected in 1886. Re-elected in 1888. Died.	1873–1875 [data missing]
William D. Kelley (Philadelphia)	Republican	March 4, 1861 – January 9, 1890	37th 38th 39th 40th 41st 42nd 43rd 44th 45th 46th 47th 48th 49th 50th 51st	Elected in 1860. Re-elected in 1862. Re-elected in 1864. Re-elected in 1866. Re-elected in 1868. Re-elected in 1870. Re-elected in 1872. Re-elected in 1874. Re-elected in 1876. Re-elected in 1878. Re-elected in 1880. Re-elected in 1882. Re-elected in 1884. Re-elected in 1886. Re-elected in 1888. Died.	1875–1883 [data missing]
William D. Kelley (Philadelphia)	Republican	March 4, 1861 – January 9, 1890	37th 38th 39th 40th 41st 42nd 43rd 44th 45th 46th 47th 48th 49th 50th 51st	Elected in 1860. Re-elected in 1862. Re-elected in 1864. Re-elected in 1866. Re-elected in 1868. Re-elected in 1870. Re-elected in 1872. Re-elected in 1874. Re-elected in 1876. Re-elected in 1878. Re-elected in 1880. Re-elected in 1882. Re-elected in 1884. Re-elected in 1886. Re-elected in 1888. Died.	1883–1889 [data missing]
William D. Kelley (Philadelphia)	Republican	March 4, 1861 – January 9, 1890	37th 38th 39th 40th 41st 42nd 43rd 44th 45th 46th 47th 48th 49th 50th 51st	Elected in 1860. Re-elected in 1862. Re-elected in 1864. Re-elected in 1866. Re-elected in 1868. Re-elected in 1870. Re-elected in 1872. Re-elected in 1874. Re-elected in 1876. Re-elected in 1878. Re-elected in 1880. Re-elected in 1882. Re-elected in 1884. Re-elected in 1886. Re-elected in 1888. Died.	1889–1893 [data missing]
Vacant		January 9, 1890 – February 18, 1890	51st		1889–1893 [data missing]
John E. Reyburn (Philadelphia)	Republican	February 18, 1890 – March 3, 1897	51st 52nd 53rd 54th	Elected to finish Kelley's term. Re-elected in 1890. Re-elected in 1892. Re-elected in 1894. Lost renomination.	1889–1893 [data missing]
John E. Reyburn (Philadelphia)	Republican	February 18, 1890 – March 3, 1897	51st 52nd 53rd 54th	Elected to finish Kelley's term. Re-elected in 1890. Re-elected in 1892. Re-elected in 1894. Lost renomination.	1893–1903 [data missing]
James R. Young (Philadelphia)	Republican	March 4, 1897 – March 3, 1903	55th 56th 57th	Elected in 1896. Re-elected in 1898. Re-elected in 1900. [data missing]	1893–1903 [data missing]
Robert H. Foerderer (Philadelphia)	Republican	March 4, 1903 – July 26, 1903	58th	Redistricted from the at-large district and re-elected in 1902. Died.	1903–1913 [data missing]
Vacant		July 26, 1903 – November 3, 1903	58th		1903–1913 [data missing]
Reuben O. Moon (Philadelphia)	Republican	November 3, 1903 – March 3, 1913	58th 59th 60th 61st 62nd	Elected to finish Foerderer's term. Re-elected in 1904. Re-elected in 1906. Re-elected in 1908. Re-elected in 1910. Lost renomination.	1903–1913 [data missing]
George W. Edmonds (Philadelphia)	Republican	March 4, 1913 – March 3, 1925	63rd 64th 65th 66th 67th 68th	Elected in 1912. Re-elected in 1914. Re-elected in 1916. Re-elected in 1918. Re-elected in 1920. Re-elected in 1922. Lost renomination.	1913–1923
George W. Edmonds (Philadelphia)	Republican	March 4, 1913 – March 3, 1925	63rd 64th 65th 66th 67th 68th	Elected in 1912. Re-elected in 1914. Re-elected in 1916. Re-elected in 1918. Re-elected in 1920. Re-elected in 1922. Lost renomination.	1923–1933
Benjamin M. Golder (Philadelphia)	Republican	March 4, 1925 – March 3, 1933	69th 70th 71st 72nd	Elected in 1924. Re-elected in 1926. Re-elected in 1928. Re-elected in 1930. Lost re-election.	1923–1933
George W. Edmonds (Philadelphia)	Republican	March 4, 1933 – January 3, 1935	73rd	Elected in 1932. Lost re-election.	1933–1943
J. Burrwood Daly (Philadelphia)	Democratic	January 3, 1935 – March 12, 1939	74th 75th 76th	Elected in 1934. Re-elected in 1936. Re-elected in 1938. Died.	1933–1943
Vacant		March 12, 1939 – November 7, 1939	76th		1933–1943
John E. Sheridan (Philadelphia)	Democratic	November 7, 1939 – January 3, 1947	76th 77th 78th 79th	Elected to finish Daly's term. Re-elected in 1940. Re-elected in 1942. Re-elected in 1944. Retired.	1933–1943
John E. Sheridan (Philadelphia)	Democratic	November 7, 1939 – January 3, 1947	76th 77th 78th 79th	Elected to finish Daly's term. Re-elected in 1940. Re-elected in 1942. Re-elected in 1944. Retired.	1943–1945
John E. Sheridan (Philadelphia)	Democratic	November 7, 1939 – January 3, 1947	76th 77th 78th 79th	Elected to finish Daly's term. Re-elected in 1940. Re-elected in 1942. Re-elected in 1944. Retired.	1945–1953
Franklin J. Maloney (Philadelphia)	Republican	January 3, 1947 – January 3, 1949	80th	Elected in 1946. Lost re-election.	1945–1953
Earl Chudoff (Philadelphia)	Democratic	January 3, 1949 – January 5, 1958	81st 82nd 83rd 84th 85th	Elected in 1948. Re-elected in 1950. Re-elected in 1952. Re-elected in 1954. Re-elected in 1956. Resigned to become judge of the Philadelphia Court of Common Pleas.	1945–1953
Earl Chudoff (Philadelphia)	Democratic	January 3, 1949 – January 5, 1958	81st 82nd 83rd 84th 85th	Elected in 1948. Re-elected in 1950. Re-elected in 1952. Re-elected in 1954. Re-elected in 1956. Resigned to become judge of the Philadelphia Court of Common Pleas.	1953–1963
Vacant		January 5, 1958 – May 20, 1958	85th		1953–1963
Robert N. C. Nix Sr. (Philadelphia)	Democratic	May 20, 1958 – January 3, 1963	85th 86th 87th	Elected to finish Chudoff's term. Re-elected in 1958. Re-elected in 1960. Redistricted to the 2nd district.	1953–1963
Herman Toll (Philadelphia)	Democratic	January 3, 1963 – January 3, 1967	88th 89th	Redistricted from the 6th district and re-elected in 1962. Re-elected in 1964. Retired.	1963–1973
Joshua Eilberg (Philadelphia)	Democratic	January 3, 1967 – January 3, 1979	90th 91st 92nd 93rd 94th 95th	Elected in 1966. Re-elected in 1968. Re-elected in 1970. Re-elected in 1972. Re-elected in 1974. Re-elected in 1976. Lost renomination.	1963–1973
Joshua Eilberg (Philadelphia)	Democratic	January 3, 1967 – January 3, 1979	90th 91st 92nd 93rd 94th 95th	Elected in 1966. Re-elected in 1968. Re-elected in 1970. Re-elected in 1972. Re-elected in 1974. Re-elected in 1976. Lost renomination.	1973–1983
Charles F. Dougherty (Philadelphia)	Republican	January 3, 1979 – January 3, 1983	96th 97th	Elected in 1978. Re-elected in 1980. Redistricted to the 3rd district and lost re-election.	1973–1983
Joseph P. Kolter (New Brighton)	Democratic	January 3, 1983 – January 3, 1993	98th 99th 100th 101st 102nd	Elected in 1982. Re-elected in 1984. Re-elected in 1986. Re-elected in 1988. Re-elected in 1990. Lost renomination.	1983–1989
Joseph P. Kolter (New Brighton)	Democratic	January 3, 1983 – January 3, 1993	98th 99th 100th 101st 102nd	Elected in 1982. Re-elected in 1984. Re-elected in 1986. Re-elected in 1988. Re-elected in 1990. Lost renomination.	1989–1993
Ron Klink (Jeannette)	Democratic	January 3, 1993 – January 3, 2001	103rd 104th 105th 106th	Elected in 1992. Re-elected in 1994. Re-elected in 1996. Re-elected in 1998. Retired to run for U.S. Senator.	1993–2003
Melissa Hart (Bradford Woods)	Republican	January 3, 2001 – January 3, 2007	107th 108th 109th	Elected in 2000. Re-elected in 2002. Re-elected in 2004. Lost re-election.	1993–2003
Melissa Hart (Bradford Woods)	Republican	January 3, 2001 – January 3, 2007	107th 108th 109th	Elected in 2000. Re-elected in 2002. Re-elected in 2004. Lost re-election.	2003–2013
Jason Altmire (McCandless)	Democratic	January 3, 2007 – January 3, 2013	110th 111th 112th	Elected in 2006. Re-elected in 2008. Re-elected in 2010. Redistricted to the 12th district and lost renomination there.	2003–2013
Scott Perry (Dillsburg)	Republican	January 3, 2013 – January 3, 2019	113th 114th 115th	Elected in 2012. Re-elected in 2014. Re-elected in 2016. Redistricted to the 10th district.	2013–2019
Madeleine Dean (Bala Cynwyd)	Democratic	January 3, 2019 – present	116th 117th 118th 119th	Elected in 2018. Re-elected in 2020. Re-elected in 2022. Re-elected in 2024. Re-elected in 2026.	2019–2023
Madeleine Dean (Bala Cynwyd)	Democratic	January 3, 2019 – present	116th 117th 118th 119th	Elected in 2018. Re-elected in 2020. Re-elected in 2022. Re-elected in 2024. Re-elected in 2026.	2023–present

== Recent elections ==
2006 election
Party	Candidate	Votes	%
Democratic	Jason Altmire	130,480	51.92%
Republican	Melissa Hart (Incumbent)	120,822	48.08%
Majority		9,658	3.84%
Turnout		251,302	100%

2008 election
Party	Candidate	Votes	%
Democratic	Jason Altmire (Incumbent)	186,536	55.86%
Republican	Melissa Hart	147,411	44.14%

2010 election
Party	Candidate	Votes	%
Democratic	Jason Altmire (Incumbent)	120,827	50.81%
Republican	Keith Rothfus	116,958	49.19%

Pennsylvania's 4th congressional district, 2012
Party	Candidate	Votes	%
Republican	Scott Perry	181,603	59.8
Democratic	Harry Perkinson	104,643	34.4
Independent	Wayne Wolff	11,524	3.8
Libertarian	Mike Koffenberger	6,210	2.0
Total votes		303,980	100.0
Republican hold			

Pennsylvania's 4th congressional district, 2014
Party	Candidate	Votes	%
Republican	Scott Perry (incumbent)	147,090	74.5
Democratic	Linda D. Thompson	50,250	25.5
Total votes		197,340	100.0
Republican hold			

Pennsylvania's 4th congressional district, 2016
Party	Candidate	Votes	%
Republican	Scott Perry (incumbent)	220,628	66.1
Democratic	Josh Burkholder	113,372	33.9
Total votes		334,000	100.0
Republican hold			

Pennsylvania's 4th congressional district, 2018
Party	Candidate	Votes	%
Democratic	Madeleine Dean	211,524	63.5
Republican	Dan David	121,467	36.5
Total votes		332,991	100.0
Democratic hold			

2020 election
Party	Candidate	Votes	%
Democratic	Madeleine Dean (incumbent)	264,637	59.5
Republican	Kathy Barnette	179,926	40.5
Total votes		444,563	100.0
Democratic hold			

2022 election
Party	Candidate	Votes	%
Democratic	Madeleine Dean (incumbent)	224,799	61.3
Republican	Christian Nascimento	141,986	38.7
Total votes		366,785	100.0
Democratic hold			

2024
Party	Candidate	Votes	%
Democratic	Madeleine Dean (incumbent)	269,066	59.1
Republican	David Winkler	186,457	40.9
Total votes		455,523	100.0
Democratic hold			

== See also ==
- List of United States congressional districts
- Pennsylvania's congressional districts
