= Pennsylvania's 6th congressional district =

U.S. House district for Pennsylvania

Coordinates: 40°03′37″N 75°38′27″W

- Interactive map of district boundaries since January 3, 2023 (Chester County outlined in red)
- Representative: Chrissy Houlahan; D–Devon
- Population (2025): 789,502
- Median household income: $108,741
- Ethnicity: 69.2% White; 16.4% Hispanic; 5.4% Black; 5.1% Asian; 3.3% Two or more races; 0.5% other
- Cook PVI: D+6

Pennsylvania's 6th congressional district is a district in the state of Pennsylvania. It includes almost all of Chester County and the southeastern portion of Berks County including the city of Reading and its southeastern suburbs. The district is represented by Democrat Chrissy Houlahan, who has served in Congress since 2019. As currently drawn, the district is among the wealthiest in Pennsylvania. The Supreme Court of Pennsylvania redrew the district in February 2018 after ruling the previous map unconstitutional.

Jim Gerlach served as the district's Representative from 2003 to 2014. In 2004 and 2006, Gerlach won re-election against fellow attorney and now Montgomery County Court of Common Pleas Judge Lois Murphy. In 2008, he successfully ran for re-election against businessman and veteran Bob Roggio. In the 2010 and 2012 elections, Gerlach defeated physician and Iraq War veteran Manan Trivedi, the Democratic nominee.

In January 2014, Gerlach announced that he would not stand for reelection to the 114th Congress. In the race to succeed Gerlach, Chester County Commissioner Ryan Costello won the Republican nomination and physician and Iraq war veteran Manan Trivedi secured the Democratic party's nomination.

In February 2018, following the Supreme Court of Pennsylvania's ordered redrawing of congressional districts, Costello announced he would not stand for reelection and retire at the end of the 115th Congress, leaving businessman Greg McCauley as the sole Republican candidate while the Democrats nominated Air Force veteran Chrissy Houlahan. Houlahan defeated McCauley in the general election.

== Recent election results from statewide races ==
Year	Office	Results
2008	President	Obama 55–43%
2008	Attorney General	Corbett 55–45%
2008	Auditor General	Wagner 54–46%
2010	Senate	Toomey 53–47%
2010	Governor	Corbett 56–44%
2012	President	Obama 52–48%
2012	Senate	Casey Jr. 53–47%
2014	Governor	Wolf 52–48%
2016	President	Clinton 52–44%
2016	Senate	Toomey 48.5–48.0%
2016	Attorney General	Shapiro 51–49%
2016	Auditor General	Brown 48–46%
2016	Treasurer	Torsella 49–45%
2018	Senate	Casey Jr. 59–39%
2018	Governor	Wolf 61–37%
2020	President	Biden 57–42%
2020	Attorney General	Shapiro 54–43%
2020	Auditor General	Ahmad 50–46%
2020	Treasurer	Torsella 52–45%
2022	Senate	Fetterman 56–41%
2022	Governor	Shapiro 61–37%
2024	President	Harris 55–44%
2024	Senate	Casey Jr. 54–43%
2024	Attorney General	DePasquale 51–47%
2024	Auditor General	Kenyatta 51–46%
2024	Treasurer	McClelland 51–47%

== Historic geography ==
=== 2003 to 2012 ===
Prior to the court-ordered redistricting, the 6th district's incarnation dated back to 2002. Its strange shape brought charges of gerrymandering by Democrats who argued it "looms like a dragon descending on Philadelphia from the west, splitting up towns and communities throughout Montgomery and Berks Counties." The combination of very affluent suburban areas of Philadelphia and sparsely populated rural areas was possibly designed to capture Republican voters, but changes in voting patterns in southeastern Pennsylvania has made the district much more competitive. The district had a Cook Partisan Voting Index score of R+1 after the 2012 redistricting. It was rated D+4 before then. The district included parts of Montgomery County, Chester County, Berks County and Lehigh County. The largest cities in the district were Reading and Norristown.

=== 2013 to 2018 ===
The redistricting of 2011/2012 changed it to include parts of Chester, Montgomery, Berks and Lebanon counties. The following municipalities constituted the sixth district:

Berks County

Townships	Boroughs
Alsace; Bern; Colebrookdale; Cumru District 1,4,6,7; Exeter; Heidelberg; Herford District 2; Lower Alsace District 2; Lower Heidelberg; Maidencreek; Marion; Muhlenberg 2,3,5,6,7,8,9; North Heidelberg; Ontelaunee; Penn; Richmond; Rockland; Ruscombmanor; South Heidelberg; Spring District 5,7,8; Washington	Bally; Bechtelsville; Bernville; Birdsboro; Boyertown; Fleetwood; Kenhorst; Laureldale District 1(part); Leesport; Robesonia; Shillington; Sinking Spring; St. Lawrence; Wernersville; Womelsdorf; Wyomissing District 1,2,4,5

Chester County

Townships	Boroughs
Caln; Charlestown; East Bradford District 1; East Brandywine; East Caln; East Goshen; East Nantmeal; East Pikeland; East Whiteland; Easttown; Londonderry; North Coventry; Schuylkill; South Coventry; Thornbury; Tredyffrin; Upper Uwchlan; Uwchlan; West Bradford District 1,2,3; West Goshen; West Pikeland; West Vincent; West Whiteland; Westtown; Willistown	Downingtown; Malvern; Phoenixville; Spring City; West Chester

Lebanon County

Townships	Boroughs
Heidelberg; Jackson; Millcreek; North Lebanon District E; South Lebanon; West Cornwall	Cornwall; Myerstown; Richland; City of Lebanon; Wards 1,2,4,5,7,8,9,10

Montgomery County

Townships	Boroughs
Douglass; Limerick; Lower Pottsgrove; Lower Providence; New Hanover; Perkiomen District 1,2; Upper Hanover District 3; Upper Pottsgrove; Upper Providence; West Norriton District 1,2,3; West Pottsgrove	Collegeville; East Greenville; Pennsburg; Pottstown; Red Hill; Royersford; Schwenksville; Trappe

=== 2019 ===
The court-ordered map made the 6th a more compact district in Berks and Chester counties.

== Current counties and municipalities ==
Berks County (19)
Birdsboro, Brecknock Township, Caernarvon Township, Cumru Township, Exeter Township (part; also 4th; includes Baumstown, Jacksonwald, Lorane, Reiffton, and part of Pennside and Stony Creek Mills), Kenhorst, Lower Alsace Township, Mohnton, Mount Penn, New Morgan, Reading, Robeson Township, St. Lawrence, Sinking Spring, Shillington, Spring Townwship, Union Township, West Reading, Wyomissing

Chester County (73)

All 73 municipalities

== List of members representing the district ==
=== 1791–1793: one seat ===
District created in 1791 from the at-large district.

Representative	Party	Years	Cong ress	Electoral history
District first established March 4, 1791
Andrew Gregg (Carlisle)	Anti-Administration	March 4, 1791 – March 3, 1793	2nd	Elected in 1791. Redistricted to the at-large district.

District redistricted in 1793 to the at-large district.

=== 1795–1813: one seat ===
District created in 1795.

Member	Party	Years	Cong ress	Electoral history
Samuel Maclay (Shippensburg)	Democratic-Republican	March 4, 1795 – March 3, 1797	4th	Elected in 1794. Lost re-election.
John A. Hanna (Harrisburg)	Democratic-Republican	March 4, 1797 – March 3, 1803	5th 6th 7th	Elected in 1796. Re-elected in 1798. Re-elected in 1800. Redistricted to the 4th district.
John Stewart (York)	Democratic-Republican	March 4, 1803 – March 3, 1805	8th	Redistricted from the 8th district and re-elected in 1802. Lost re-election.
James Kelly (Philadelphia)	Federalist	March 4, 1805 – March 3, 1809	9th 10th	Elected in 1804. Re-elected in 1806. Lost re-election.
William Crawford (Gettysburg)	Democratic-Republican	March 4, 1809 – March 3, 1813	11th 12th	Elected in 1808. Re-elected in 1810. Redistricted to the 5th district.

=== 1813–1823: two seats ===
Cong ress	Years	Seat A			Seat B		
Cong ress	Years	Representative	Party	Electoral history	Representative	Party	Electoral history
13th	March 4, 1813 – March 3, 1815	Samuel D. Ingham (New Hope)	Democratic-Republican	Elected in 1812. Re-elected in 1814. Re-elected in 1816. Resigned.	Robert Brown (Weaversville)	Democratic-Republican	Redistricted from the 2nd district and re-elected in 1812. Retired.
14th	March 4, 1815 – March 3, 1817	Samuel D. Ingham (New Hope)	Democratic-Republican	Elected in 1812. Re-elected in 1814. Re-elected in 1816. Resigned.	John Ross (Easton)	Democratic-Republican	Elected in 1814. Re-elected in 1816. Resigned to become president judge of the seventh judicial district of Pennsylvania.
15th	March 4, 1817 – February 24, 1818	Samuel D. Ingham (New Hope)	Democratic-Republican	Elected in 1812. Re-elected in 1814. Re-elected in 1816. Resigned.	John Ross (Easton)	Democratic-Republican	Elected in 1814. Re-elected in 1816. Resigned to become president judge of the seventh judicial district of Pennsylvania.
15th	February 24, 1818 – March 3, 1818	Samuel D. Ingham (New Hope)	Democratic-Republican	Elected in 1812. Re-elected in 1814. Re-elected in 1816. Resigned.	Vacant		
15th	March 3, 1818 – July 6, 1818	Samuel D. Ingham (New Hope)	Democratic-Republican	Elected in 1812. Re-elected in 1814. Re-elected in 1816. Resigned.	Thomas Jones Rogers (Easton)	Democratic-Republican	Elected to finish Ross's term. Also elected 1818 to the next term. Re-elected in 1820. Redistricted to the 8th district.
15th	July 6, 1818 – October 13, 1818	Vacant			Thomas Jones Rogers (Easton)	Democratic-Republican	Elected to finish Ross's term. Also elected 1818 to the next term. Re-elected in 1820. Redistricted to the 8th district.
15th	October 13, 1818 – March 3, 1819	Samuel Moore (Doylestown)	Democratic-Republican	Elected to finish Ingham's term. Also elected 1818 to the next term. Re-elected in 1820. Resigned.	Thomas Jones Rogers (Easton)	Democratic-Republican	Elected to finish Ross's term. Also elected 1818 to the next term. Re-elected in 1820. Redistricted to the 8th district.
16th	March 4, 1819 – March 3, 1821	Samuel Moore (Doylestown)	Democratic-Republican	Elected to finish Ingham's term. Also elected 1818 to the next term. Re-elected in 1820. Resigned.	Thomas Jones Rogers (Easton)	Democratic-Republican	Elected to finish Ross's term. Also elected 1818 to the next term. Re-elected in 1820. Redistricted to the 8th district.
17th	March 4, 1821 – May 20, 1822	Samuel Moore (Doylestown)	Democratic-Republican	Elected to finish Ingham's term. Also elected 1818 to the next term. Re-elected in 1820. Resigned.	Thomas Jones Rogers (Easton)	Democratic-Republican	Elected to finish Ross's term. Also elected 1818 to the next term. Re-elected in 1820. Redistricted to the 8th district.
17th	May 20, 1822 – October 7, 1822	Vacant			Thomas Jones Rogers (Easton)	Democratic-Republican	Elected to finish Ross's term. Also elected 1818 to the next term. Re-elected in 1820. Redistricted to the 8th district.
17th	October 7, 1822 – March 3, 1823	Samuel D. Ingham (New Hope)	Democratic-Republican	Elected to finish Moore's term. Redistricted to the 8th district.	Thomas Jones Rogers (Easton)	Democratic-Republican	Elected to finish Ross's term. Also elected 1818 to the next term. Re-elected in 1820. Redistricted to the 8th district.

=== 1823–present: one seat ===
Member	Party	Years	Cong ress	Electoral history	District location
Robert Harris (Harrisburg)	Jackson; Democratic-Republican	March 4, 1823 – March 3, 1825	18th 19th	Elected in 1822. Re-elected in 1824. Retired.	1823–1833 [data missing]
Robert Harris (Harrisburg)	Jacksonian	March 4, 1825 – March 3, 1827	18th 19th	Elected in 1822. Re-elected in 1824. Retired.	1823–1833 [data missing]
Innis Green (Dauphin)	Jacksonian	March 4, 1827 – March 3, 1831	20th 21st	Elected in 1826. Re-elected in 1828. Retired.	1823–1833 [data missing]
John C. Bucher (Harrisburg)	Jacksonian	March 4, 1831 – March 3, 1833	22nd	Elected in 1830. Redistricted to the 10th district.	1823–1833 [data missing]
Robert Ramsey (Hartsville)	Jacksonian	March 4, 1833 – March 3, 1835	23rd	Elected in 1832. Retired.	1833–1843 [data missing]
Mathias Morris (Doylestown)	Anti-Jacksonian	March 4, 1835 – March 3, 1837	24th 25th	Elected in 1834. Re-elected in 1836. Lost re-election.	1833–1843 [data missing]
Mathias Morris (Doylestown)	Whig	March 4, 1837 – March 3, 1839	24th 25th	Elected in 1834. Re-elected in 1836. Lost re-election.	1833–1843 [data missing]
John Davis (Davisville)	Democratic	March 4, 1839 – March 3, 1841	26th	Elected in 1838. Lost re-election.	1833–1843 [data missing]
Robert Ramsey (Hartsville)	Whig	March 4, 1841 – March 3, 1843	27th	Elected in 1840. Retired.	1833–1843 [data missing]
Michael H. Jenks (Newtown)	Whig	March 4, 1843 – March 3, 1845	28th	Elected in 1843. Lost re-election.	1843–1853 [data missing]
Jacob Erdman (Coopersburg)	Democratic	March 4, 1845 – March 3, 1847	29th	Elected in 1844. Lost re-election.	1843–1853 [data missing]
John Westbrook Hornbeck (Allentown)	Whig	March 4, 1847 – January 16, 1848	30th	Elected in 1846. Died.	1843–1853 [data missing]
Vacant		January 17, 1848 – March 5, 1848	30th		1843–1853 [data missing]
Samuel A. Bridges (Allentown)	Democratic	March 6, 1848 – March 3, 1849	30th	Elected to finish Hornbeck's term. Retired.	1843–1853 [data missing]
Thomas Ross (Doylestown)	Democratic	March 4, 1849 – March 3, 1853	31st 32nd	Elected in 1848. Re-elected in 1850. [data missing]	1843–1853 [data missing]
William Everhart (West Chester)	Whig	March 4, 1853 – March 3, 1855	33rd	Elected in 1852. [data missing]	1853–1863 [data missing]
John Hickman (West Chester)	Democratic	March 4, 1855 – March 3, 1859	34th 35th 36th 37th	Elected in 1854. Re-elected in 1856. Re-elected in 1858. Re-elected in 1860. [data missing]	1853–1863 [data missing]
John Hickman (West Chester)	Anti-Lecompton Democratic	March 4, 1859 – March 3, 1861	34th 35th 36th 37th	Elected in 1854. Re-elected in 1856. Re-elected in 1858. Re-elected in 1860. [data missing]	1853–1863 [data missing]
John Hickman (West Chester)	Republican	March 4, 1861 – March 3, 1863	34th 35th 36th 37th	Elected in 1854. Re-elected in 1856. Re-elected in 1858. Re-elected in 1860. [data missing]	1853–1863 [data missing]
John D. Stiles (Allentown)	Democratic	March 4, 1863 – March 3, 1865	38th	Elected in 1862. [data missing]	1863–1873 [data missing]
Benjamin M. Boyer (Norristown)	Democratic	March 4, 1865 – March 3, 1869	39th 40th	Elected in 1864. Re-elected in 1866. Retired.	1863–1873 [data missing]
John D. Stiles (Allentown)	Democratic	March 4, 1869 – March 3, 1871	41st	Redistricted from the 7th district and re-elected in 1868. Retired.	1863–1873 [data missing]
Ephraim L. Acker (Norristown)	Democratic	March 4, 1871 – March 3, 1873	42nd	Elected in 1870. Lost re-election.	1863–1873 [data missing]
James S. Biery (Allentown)	Republican	March 4, 1873 – March 3, 1875	43rd	Elected in 1872. Retired.	1873–1883 [data missing]
Washington Townsend (West Chester)	Republican	March 4, 1875 – March 3, 1877	44th	Redistricted from the 7th district and re-elected in 1874. Retired.	1873–1883 [data missing]
William Ward (Chester)	Republican	March 4, 1877 – March 3, 1883	45th 46th 47th	Elected in 1876. Re-elected in 1878. Re-elected in 1880. Retired.	1873–1883 [data missing]
James B. Everhart (West Chester)	Republican	March 4, 1883 – March 3, 1887	48th 49th	Elected in 1882. Re-elected in 1884. Lost renomination.	1883–1889 [data missing]
malign=left | Smedley Darlington (West Chester)	Republican	March 4, 1887 – March 3, 1891	50th 51st	Elected in 1886. Re-elected in 1888. Retired.	1883–1889 [data missing]
malign=left | Smedley Darlington (West Chester)	Republican	March 4, 1887 – March 3, 1891	50th 51st	Elected in 1886. Re-elected in 1888. Retired.	1889–1893 [data missing]
John B. Robinson (Media)	Republican	March 4, 1891 – March 3, 1897	52nd 53rd 54th	Elected in 1890. Re-elected in 1892. Re-elected in 1894. Lost re-election.	1889–1893 [data missing]
John B. Robinson (Media)	Republican	March 4, 1891 – March 3, 1897	52nd 53rd 54th	Elected in 1890. Re-elected in 1892. Re-elected in 1894. Lost re-election.	1893–1903
Thomas S. Butler (West Chester)	Independent Republican	March 4, 1897 – March 3, 1899	55th 56th 57th	Elected in 1896. Re-elected in 1898. Re-elected in 1900. [data missing]	1893–1903
Thomas S. Butler (West Chester)	Republican	March 4, 1899 – March 3, 1903	55th 56th 57th	Elected in 1896. Re-elected in 1898. Re-elected in 1900. [data missing]	
George D. McCreary (Philadelphia)	Republican	March 4, 1903 – March 3, 1913	58th 59th 60th 61st 62nd	Elected in 1902. Re-elected in 1904. Re-elected in 1906. Re-elected in 1908. Re-elected in 1910. Retired.	1903–1913
J. Washington Logue (Philadelphia)	Democratic	March 4, 1913 – March 3, 1915	63rd	Elected in 1912. Lost re-election.	1913–1923
George P. Darrow (Philadelphia)	Republican	March 4, 1915 – March 3, 1923	64th 65th 66th 67th	Elected in 1914. Re-elected in 1916. Re-elected in 1918. Re-elected in 1920. Redistricted to the 7th district.	1913–1923
George A. Welsh (Philadelphia)	Republican	March 4, 1923 – May 31, 1932	68th 69th 70th 71st 72nd	Elected in 1922. Re-elected in 1924. Re-elected in 1926. Re-elected in 1928. Re-elected in 1930. Resigned to become a district court judge.	1923–1933
Vacant		May 31, 1932 – November 8, 1932	72nd		1923–1933
Robert L. Davis (Philadelphia)	Republican	November 8, 1932 – March 3, 1933	72nd	Elected to finish Welsh's term. [data missing]	1923–1933
Edward L. Stokes (Philadelphia)	Republican	March 4, 1933 – January 3, 1935	73rd	Redistricted from the 2nd district and re-elected in 1932. Retired to run for Governor.	1933–1943
Michael J. Stack (Philadelphia)	Democratic	January 3, 1935 – January 3, 1939	74th 75th	Elected in 1934. Re-elected in 1936. Lost renomination and lost re-election under a different party.	1933–1943
Francis J. Myers (Philadelphia)	Democratic	January 3, 1939 – January 3, 1945	76th 77th 78th	Elected in 1938. Re-elected in 1940. Re-elected in 1942. [data missing]	1933–1943
Francis J. Myers (Philadelphia)	Democratic	January 3, 1939 – January 3, 1945	76th 77th 78th	Elected in 1938. Re-elected in 1940. Re-elected in 1942. [data missing]	1943–1945
Herbert J. McGlinchey (Philadelphia)	Democratic	January 3, 1945 – January 3, 1947	79th	Elected in 1944. Lost re-election.	1945–1953
Hugh Scott (Philadelphia)	Republican	January 3, 1947 – January 3, 1959	80th 81st 82nd 83rd 84th 85th	Elected in 1946. Re-elected in 1948. Re-elected in 1950. Re-elected in 1952. Re-elected in 1954. Re-elected in 1956. Retired to run for U.S. Senator.	1945–1953
Hugh Scott (Philadelphia)	Republican	January 3, 1947 – January 3, 1959	80th 81st 82nd 83rd 84th 85th	Elected in 1946. Re-elected in 1948. Re-elected in 1950. Re-elected in 1952. Re-elected in 1954. Re-elected in 1956. Retired to run for U.S. Senator.	1953–1963
Herman Toll (Philadelphia)	Democratic	January 3, 1959 – January 3, 1963	86th 87th	Elected in 1958. Re-elected in 1960. Redistricted to the 4th district.	1953–1963
George M. Rhodes (Reading)	Democratic	January 3, 1963 – January 3, 1969	88th 89th 90th	Redistricted from the 14th district and re-elected in 1962. Re-elected in 1964. Re-elected in 1966. Retired.	1963–1967
Gus Yatron (Reading)	Democratic	January 3, 1969 – January 3, 1993	91st 92nd 93rd 94th 95th 96th 97th 98th 99th 100th 101st 102nd	Elected in 1968. Re-elected in 1970. Re-elected in 1972. Re-elected in 1974. Re-elected in 1976. Re-elected in 1978. Re-elected in 1980. Re-elected in 1982. Re-elected in 1984. Re-elected in 1986. Re-elected in 1988. Re-elected in 1990. Retired.	1963–1967
Gus Yatron (Reading)	Democratic	January 3, 1969 – January 3, 1993	91st 92nd 93rd 94th 95th 96th 97th 98th 99th 100th 101st 102nd	Elected in 1968. Re-elected in 1970. Re-elected in 1972. Re-elected in 1974. Re-elected in 1976. Re-elected in 1978. Re-elected in 1980. Re-elected in 1982. Re-elected in 1984. Re-elected in 1986. Re-elected in 1988. Re-elected in 1990. Retired.	1973–1983
Gus Yatron (Reading)	Democratic	January 3, 1969 – January 3, 1993	91st 92nd 93rd 94th 95th 96th 97th 98th 99th 100th 101st 102nd	Elected in 1968. Re-elected in 1970. Re-elected in 1972. Re-elected in 1974. Re-elected in 1976. Re-elected in 1978. Re-elected in 1980. Re-elected in 1982. Re-elected in 1984. Re-elected in 1986. Re-elected in 1988. Re-elected in 1990. Retired.	1983–1993
Tim Holden (St. Clair)	Democratic	January 3, 1993 – January 3, 2003	103rd 104th 105th 106th 107th	Elected in 1992. Re-elected in 1994. Re-elected in 1996. Re-elected in 1998. Re-elected in 2000. Redistricted to the 17th district.	1993–2003
Jim Gerlach (Chester Springs)	Republican	January 3, 2003 – January 3, 2015	108th 109th 110th 111th 112th 113th	Elected in 2002. Re-elected in 2004. Re-elected in 2006. Re-elected in 2008. Re-elected in 2010. Re-elected in 2012. Retired.	2003–2013
Jim Gerlach (Chester Springs)	Republican	January 3, 2003 – January 3, 2015	108th 109th 110th 111th 112th 113th	Elected in 2002. Re-elected in 2004. Re-elected in 2006. Re-elected in 2008. Re-elected in 2010. Re-elected in 2012. Retired.	2013–2019
Ryan Costello (West Chester)	Republican	January 3, 2015 – January 3, 2019	114th 115th	Elected in 2014. Re-elected in 2016. Retired.	2013–2019
Chrissy Houlahan (Devon)	Democratic	January 3, 2019 – present	116th 117th 118th 119th	Elected in 2018. Re-elected in 2020. Re-elected in 2022. Re-elected in 2024. Re-elected in 2026.	2019–2023
Chrissy Houlahan (Devon)	Democratic	January 3, 2019 – present	116th 117th 118th 119th	Elected in 2018. Re-elected in 2020. Re-elected in 2022. Re-elected in 2024. Re-elected in 2026.	2023–present

== Recent election results ==
=== 2012 ===
Pennsylvania's 6th congressional district, 2012
Party	Candidate	Votes	%
Republican	Jim Gerlach (Incumbent)	191,725	57.1
Democratic	Manan Trivedi	143,803	42.9
Total votes		335,528	100.0
Republican hold			

=== 2014 ===
Pennsylvania's 6th congressional district, 2014
Party	Candidate	Votes	%
Republican	Ryan Costello	119,643	56.3
Democratic	Manan Trivedi	92,901	43.7
Total votes		212,544	100.0
Republican hold			

=== 2016 ===
Pennsylvania's 6th congressional district, 2016
Party	Candidate	Votes	%
Republican	Ryan Costello (incumbent)	207,469	57.2
Democratic	Mike Parrish	155,000	42.8
Total votes		362,469	100.0
Republican hold			

=== 2018 ===
Pennsylvania's 6th congressional district, 2018
Party	Candidate	Votes	%
Democratic	Chrissy Houlahan	177,704	58.9
Republican	Greg McCauley	124,124	41.1
Total votes		301,828	100.0
Democratic gain from Republican			

=== 2020 ===
Pennsylvania's 6th congressional district, 2020
Party	Candidate	Votes	%
Democratic	Chrissy Houlahan (incumbent)	226,440	56.1
Republican	John Emmons	177,526	43.9
Total votes		403,966	100.0
Democratic hold			

=== 2022 ===
Pennsylvania's 6th congressional district, 2022
Party	Candidate	Votes	%
Democratic	Chrissy Houlahan (incumbent)	190,386	58.3
Republican	Guy Ciarrocchi	136,097	41.7
Total votes		326,483	100.00
Democratic hold			

=== 2024 ===
Pennsylvania's 6th congressional district, 2024
Party	Candidate	Votes	%
Democratic	Chrissy Houlahan (incumbent)	235,625	56.2
Republican	Neil Young Jr.	183,638	43.8
Total votes		419,263	100.0
Democratic hold			

== See also ==
- List of United States congressional districts
- Pennsylvania's congressional districts
