= John Davis (Pennsylvania politician) =

American politician

Member of the U.S. House of Representatives from Pennsylvania's 6th district
- In office March 4, 1839 – March 3, 1841
- Preceded by: Mathias Morris
- Succeeded by: Robert Ramsey

Personal details
- Born: August 7, 1788 Solebury Township, Pennsylvania, US
- Died: April 1, 1878 (aged 89) Davisville, Pennsylvania, USA
- Resting place: Davisville Baptist Church Cemetery
- Party: Democratic
- Occupation: Politician

Military service
- Allegiance: United States of America
- Rank: Major General of Militia
- Battles/wars: War of 1812

John Davis (August 7, 1788 – April 1, 1878) was an American politician who served one term as a member of the U.S. House of Representatives from Pennsylvania from 1839 to 1841. He was also a veteran of the War of 1812.

== Early life ==
John Davis was born in Solebury Township, Pennsylvania. He moved to Maryland and settled on a farm at Rock Creek Meeting House in 1795.

He returned to Pennsylvania in 1812 and settled in what is now Davisville, Pennsylvania to engage in agricultural and mercantile pursuits.

== Career ==
=== War of 1812 ===
He served as a served as captain in the War of 1812. He rose to the rank of major general of militia.

=== Political ===
Davis was elected as a Democrat to the 26th Congress. He was an unsuccessful candidate for re-election in 1840 to the 27th Congress.

== Later life ==
Davis was appointed surveyor of the port of Philadelphia by President James K. Polk and served from 1845 to 1849.

He resumed his former business activities until his death.

== Death and burial ==
died in Davisville in 1878, interred in Davisville Baptist Church Cemetery in Bucks County, Pennsylvania.

U.S. House of Representatives
Preceded by Mathias Morris	Member of the U.S. House of Representatives from Pennsylvania's 6th congressional district 1835–1839	Succeeded by Robert Ramsey
