= Isaac Van Horne =

American politician

Isaac Van Horne (January 13, 1754, Solebury Township, Pennsylvania – February 2, 1834, Zanesville, Ohio) was a member of the U.S. House of Representatives from Pennsylvania.

== Early life ==
He was the eldest son of Bernard Van Horne and his first wife Sarah Van Pelt. He was descended from several Dutch families that came to America when New York was a Colony of the Netherlands. His father's family, sometimes spelled "van Hoorn", had earlier been identified with the European Noble Family of that name.

His paternal immigrant ancestor Christian Barentsen van Hoorn had a house lot at Wall Street and Broadway which is now part of Trinity Churchyard, and was Fire Marshal of Manhattan in the 1650s before moving to the area of Wilmington, Delaware. His grandmother, Alice Sleght Van Horn, may have been descended from Catherine Trico Rapalgie, one of whose daughters was reputed to be the first white child born in New Netherland. He was also the 3x-great grand nephew of Peter Stuyvesant (c.1612—1672).

== Career ==
He apprenticed as a carpenter and cabinetmaker and served as justice of the peace for Solebury Township in Bucks County of Pennsylvania for several years as well as coroner of Bucks County four years.

=== Military career ===
In 1775, he was elected ensign of a company of militia, and appointed ensign in the Continental Army by the committee of safety in January 1776, assigned to Capt. John Beatty's Company in Col. Magaw's Regiment.

He was taken prisoner at the fall of Fort Washington and held as a prisoner of war from November 1776 to May 1778 when he was exchanged. He served as first lieutenant, captain lieutenant, and captain until the close of the American Revolutionary War. Van Horn was also a founding member of the Society of the Cincinnati.

From 1808 until 1810, he was Lt. Col. Commanding 1st Reg. 2nd Brig. of the Ohio Militia. During the War of 1812, he served as Adjutant General of the Ohio Militia from 1810 until 1819.

=== Political career ===
From 1796 to 1797, he was a member of the Pennsylvania House of Representatives. Immediately following his term in the Pennsylvania House, he was elected as a Republican or Jeffersonian, to the Seventh and Eighth United States Congresses.

In 1805, he moved to Zanesville, Ohio, after President Jefferson appointed him receiver of the land office at Zanesville. He held that office until December 1826 when he resigned in favor of his son Bernard. After he moved to Zanesville his first residence was a white Clapboard house on Pine St., built for him by his nephew, which was locally known as "the White House."

He was involved in a number of early Zanesville businesses, was a large landholder and served as President of The Second Federal Bank of Zanesville. He also served as head of a political faction in the 2d Capital of Ohio.

== Personal life ==
He married Dorothy Marple, the widow of Isaac Marple with whom she had already had two sons: John J. Marple and David J. Marple. Dorothy had 11 more children with Isaac:

- Dorothy Jane Van Horne, who married Peter van Woglom and later Isaac van Horne (a cousin)
- Sarah Van Horne
- Mary "Polly" Van Horne, who married Jeffrey Price, a widower with a daughter
- CPT Isaac Van Horne Jr., 2d Battle of Fort Mackinac during the War of 1812
- Samuel Van Horne
- Eliza Nann Van Horne, who married Dr. John E. Hamm (1776–1864), Marshall of Ohio during War of 1812, who with Isaac Van Horne, founded the White Glass Co. of Zanesville, Ohio in 1815, of which Isaac Van Horne was President.
- Patience Van Horne, who married Harry Safford (a silversmith in Putnam, OH)
- Cynthia Van Horne
- Bernard Van Horne, who was his successor as receiver of public monies at Zanesville in 1826
- Benjamin Franklin Van Horne
- Bvt. Maj. Joseph Jefferson Van Horne, who fought in the U.S.-Mexican War.

Van Horne died February 2, 1834, in Zanesville, Ohio. One of the bequests in his will was a donation to the American Colonization Society.

U.S. House of Representatives
Preceded by Peter G. Muhlenberg; Robert Brown	Member of the U.S. House of Representatives from Pennsylvania's 4th congressional district 1801–1803 alongside: Robert Brown	Succeeded by John Andre Hanna; David Bard
Preceded by Michael Leib	Member of the U.S. House of Representatives from Pennsylvania's 2nd congressional district 1803–1805 alongside: Robert Brown and Frederick Conrad	Succeeded by Robert Brown; Frederick Conrad; John Pugh
Military offices
Preceded by Joseph Kerr	Adjutant General of Ohio; 1810–1811	Succeeded by Thomas Worthington
Preceded by Thomas Worthington	Adjutant General of Ohio; 1812–1818	Succeeded by William Doherty
