= Blair McClenachan =

American politician (c. 1735–1812)

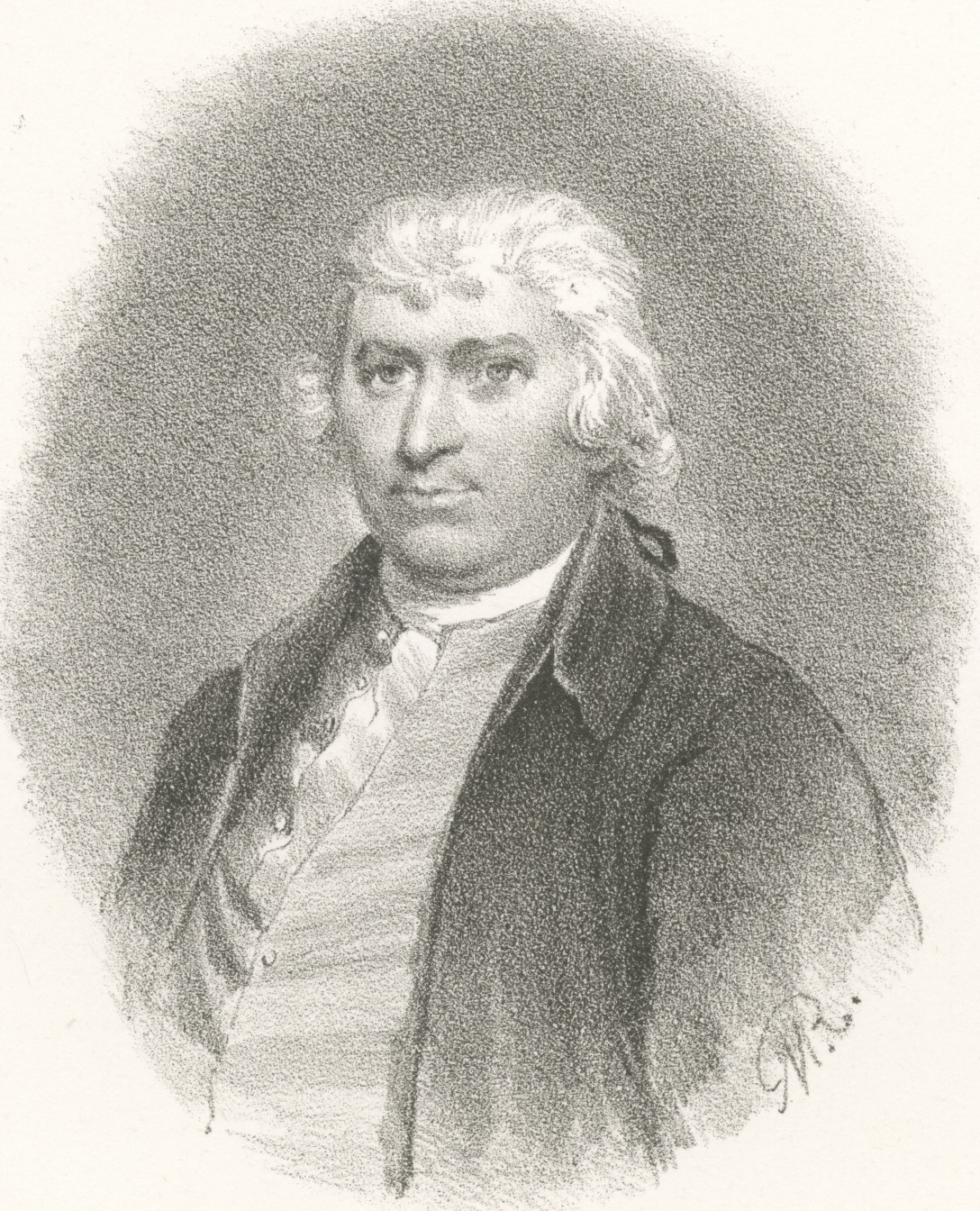
- Posthumous portrait, c. 1885

Member of the U.S. House of Representatives from Pennsylvania
- In office March 4, 1797 – March 3, 1799
- Preceded by: Frederick Muhlenberg
- Succeeded by: Michael Leib
- Constituency: 2nd district

Member of the Pennsylvania House of Representatives
- In office 1790–1795

Personal details
- Born: 1734 or 1735 Kingdom of Ireland
- Died: May 9, 1812 (aged 77) Philadelphia, Pennsylvania, U.S.
- Party: Democratic-Republican
- Profession: Merchant

Blair McClenachan (c. 1735 – May 9, 1812) was an Irish-born American merchant and politician from Pennsylvania. He served one term in the United States House of Representatives from 1797 to 1799. Previously, he served in the Pennsylvania House of Representatives.

== Biography ==
McClenachan was born in the Kingdom of Ireland in about 1735. He immigrated to America at an early age and settled in Philadelphia. He was described by Thomas Jefferson as a trader, banker, and shipowner. During the American Revolutionary War he was one of the founders of and served with the First Troop Philadelphia City Cavalry. When the Continental Congress sought to raise money for the army in 1780, McClenachan and Robert Morris were the two highest subscribers to the effort.

He was a member of the Democratic-Republican Party. In 1788, he was a candidate for Pennsylvania's at-large congressional district. From 1790 to 1795, he was a member of the Pennsylvania House of Representatives. In 1796, he defeated Robert Waln to win election to the 5th United States Congress from Pennsylvania's 2nd congressional district. He served only one term.

After his service in Congress, his businesses failed and a fraudulent transfer of his assets to his children resulted in McClenachan losing much of his fortune and led to his imprisonment for debt. In 1802, he wrote to President Thomas Jefferson, seeking the position of Purveyor of Stores. Jefferson later appointed Tench Coxe to fill the position.

== Personal life ==
McClenachan had six children. In 1781, his daughter, Deborah, married Colonel Walter Stewart, later Inspector General of the Continental Army and then Major General of the Pennsylvania Militia.

He died in a "fit of apoplexy" on Saturday, May 9, 1812, in Philadelphia, at the age of 77. He was interred in a vault in St. Paul's Cemetery.

U.S. House of Representatives
Preceded by Frederick Muhlenberg	Member of the U.S. House of Representatives from Pennsylvania's 2nd congressional district 1797–1799	Succeeded by Michael Leib
