= John Swanwick =

American politician

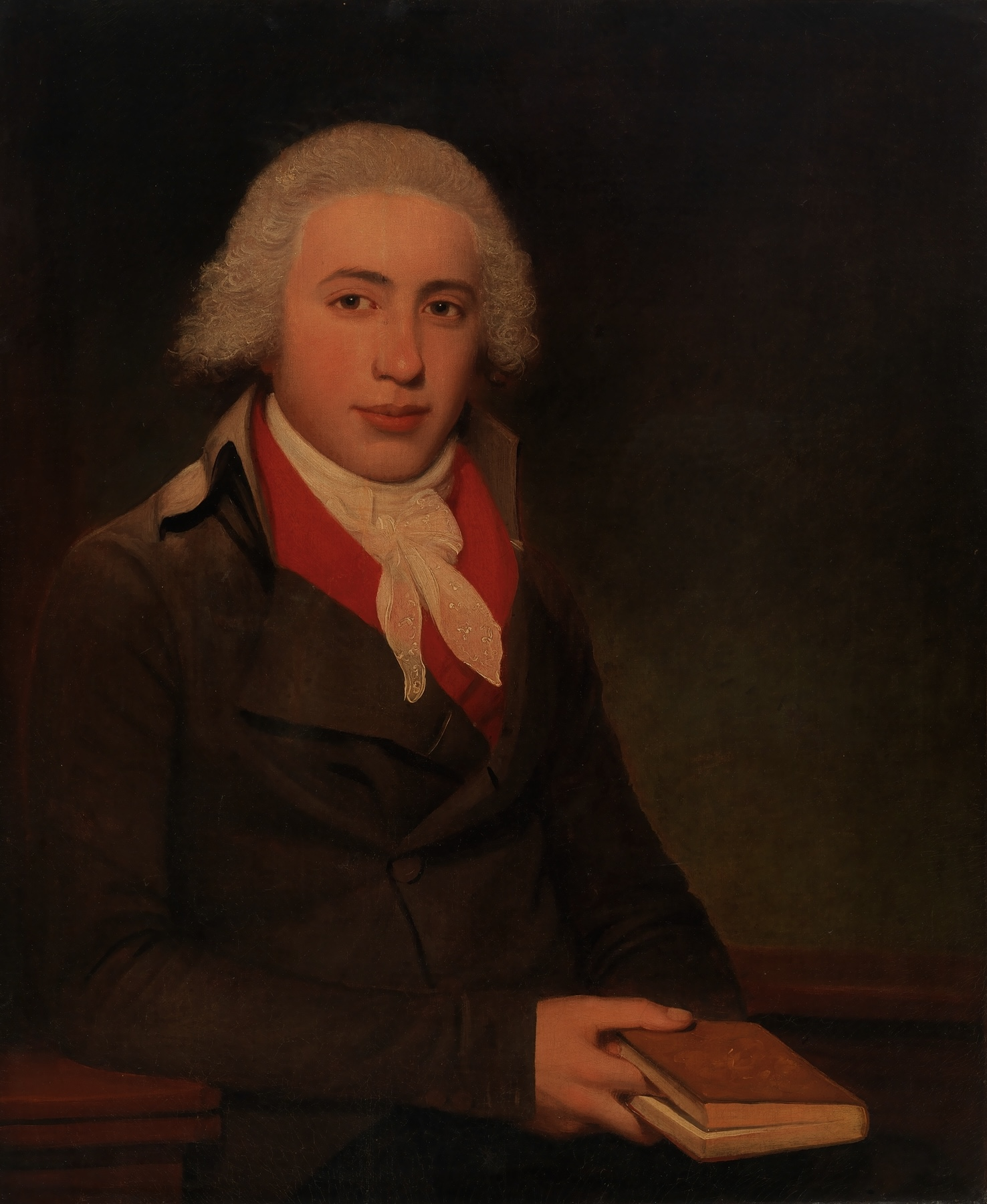
- Posthumous portrait by Matthew Pratt, c. 1800

Member of the U.S. House of Representatives from Pennsylvania
- In office March 4, 1795 – August 1, 1798
- Preceded by: District created from at-large seat
- Succeeded by: Robert Waln
- Constituency: 2nd district

Member of the Pennsylvania House of Representatives

Personal details
- Born: 1760 Liverpool, England
- Died: August 1, 1798 (aged 37–38) Philadelphia, Pennsylvania, U.S.
- Party: Democratic-Republican
- Profession: Merchant

John Swanwick (1760 – August 1, 1798) was an American merchant, poet and politician. He served in the Pennsylvania General Assembly and from 1795 to 1798, and served as the United States representative from Pennsylvania in the 4th and 5th congresses.

== Early life and career ==
Born in Liverpool, England, Swanwick and his family left England for the American colonies about 1770, settling in Caln Township in Chester County. His father was appointed as the commander of a revenue cutter, responsible for enforcing customs on the Delaware River.

In 1774, he became an apprentice to financier Robert Morris. 1781, he was appointed as the Receiver of Continental Taxes for Pennsylvania. His work for Morris later earned him a junior partnership in the firm.

While Morris trusted Swanwick at the company, he was not entirely trusted during the American Revolution or in the newly independent United States. John's father, Richard, was a staunch loyalist, which resulted in the senior Swanwick being forced to flee to New York after the British evacuation from Philadelphia, returning in 1783. In 1778, Swanwick was accused of forwarding secrets to the British via his exiled father. An investigation cleared him and Swanwick joined the second militia of the Sixth Battalion. However, even after the Revolution, he was accused of having British sympathies and wavering loyalty to the United States.

When the Bank of North America was established by Alexander Hamilton, Swanwick joins his partners, Morris and Thomas Willing in investing in the bank's shares. While Willing served as the bank's president, Swanwick ran much of the merchant operations of Willing, Morris and Swanwick.

== Political career ==
Initially, he was not active politically, but supported the Federalist Party and the election of George Washington as President of the United States. But his allegiance began to shift toward the Democratic-Republican Party as he opposed trade policy under Hamilton and Washington that favored British interests. Hamilton's establishment of the First Bank of the United States also helped push Swanwick away from the Federalists as this new national bank threatened his own investment in the Bank of North America.

In 1792, Swanwick was elected to the Pennsylvania General Assembly on a ticket that opposed Federalist policies. This was a heavily contested seat as Federalists had hoped to ensure election of one of the own to fill William Maclay's seat in the United States Senate. In the state assembly, Swanwick chaired the Ways and Means committee, which increased his power. He supported the establishment of a state hospital, public support for schools and the end of debtors' prison. After a dispute with the Bank of North America, Swanwick pushed to re-establish the Bank of Pennsylvania. He later supported establishment of the Insurance Company of North America, which continues to exist as a unit of Chubb Limited.

In the 1794 election, Swanwick ran for the United States House of Representatives against the Federalist Thomas Fitzsimons. As a merchant, Swanwick was opposed to excise taxes, which were supported by the Federalists, however, in the Whiskey Rebellion, he broke with radical factions to support raising a militia to put down the rebellion. He considered the rebellion to be undemocratic and established himself on the side of the rule of law while still opposing the excise tax. His stance, in addition to his personal financial resources, and the unpopularity of Fitzsimmons helped him win the election by 58 votes.

Once in Congress he strongly opposed the Jay Treaty and worked to persuade Washington not to sign it. He organized demonstrations in Philadelphia and supported a move in the House to refuse to fund the money necessary to execute the treaty. The attempted failed in the house 50–49 with Frederick Muhlenberg casting the deciding vote. Swanwick then broke with the Republicans and supported construction of frigates as authorized by the Naval Act of 1794 believing that the United States should have its own Navy and should build ships domestically rather than buying them from overseas. In 1796, he defeated Edward Tilghman by 70 votes to win re-election.

In 1796, Swanwick's personal finances began a slide toward insolvency. The city of Philadelphia suffered recessions in both 1796 and 1797, which resulted in the collapse of a number of trading houses. Swanwick sought financial assistance, but received little. His former partner Thomas Willing, refused to provide debt relief and only offered loans at high rates of interest. In September 1797, he assigned much of his property to trustees in order to settle his debt and in January 1798, his library was auctioned to settle his debts.

== Personal life ==
In addition to his work as a merchant and politician, Swanwick wrote poetry and published his works or presented them at society affairs. His Poems on Several Occasions was compiled in his final year at his home.

With an epidemic of Yellow fever in Philadelphia in 1798, Swanwick spent much of his time at home. However, he ultimately contracted the disease and died on August 1, 1798, in Philadelphia, where he was interred at St. Peter's Church.

== See also ==
- List of members of the United States Congress who died in office (1790–1899)

U.S. House of Representatives
Preceded by At large on a General ticket: Thomas Fitzsimons, John W. Kittera, Thomas Hartley, Thomas Scott, James Armstrong, Peter G. Muhlenberg, Andrew Gregg, Frederick A. C. Muhlenberg, Daniel Hiester, William Irvine, William Findley, John Smilie, and William Montgomery	Member of the U.S. House of Representatives from Pennsylvania's 1st congressional district 1795–1798	Succeeded by Robert Waln
