= John Chapman (Pennsylvania politician) =

American politician

Member of the U.S. House of Representatives from Pennsylvania's 4th district
- In office March 4, 1797 – March 3, 1799
- Preceded by: Samuel Sitgreaves; John Richards
- Succeeded by: Peter Muhlenberg; Robert Brown

Member of the Pennsylvania House of Representatives
- In office 1787–1796

Personal details
- Born: October 18, 1740 Wrightstown Township, Province of Pennsylvania, British America
- Died: January 27, 1800 (aged 59) Upper Makefield Township, Pennsylvania, US
- Resting place: Friends’ Burying Ground in Wrightstown Township
- Party: Federalist

John Chapman (October 18, 1740 – January 27, 1800) was an early American politician who served as member of the United States House of Representatives from Pennsylvania, serving one term from 1797 to 1799.

== Biography ==
Chapman was born in Wrightstown Township in the Province of Pennsylvania.

He was commissioned justice of the peace February 25, 1779, and was one of the justices commissioned judge of the court of common pleas of Bucks County the same year. He moved to Upper Makefield Township, Pennsylvania, prior to 1776. He was a member of the Pennsylvania General Assembly from 1787 to 1796.

He was a member of the revived American Philosophical Society, elected in 1768.

=== Congress ===
Chapman was elected as a Federalist to the Fifth Congress.

=== Death and burial ===
He died in Upper Makefield Township in 1800. Interment in the Friends’ Burying Ground in Wrightstown Township.

== Sources ==
- United States Congress. "John Chapman (id: C000313)". Biographical Directory of the United States Congress.

U.S. House of Representatives
Preceded by Samuel Sitgreaves; John Richards	Member of the U.S. House of Representatives from Pennsylvania's 4th congressional district 1797–1799	Succeeded by Peter Muhlenberg; Robert Brown
