= John Stewart (Pennsylvania politician) =

American politician

John Stewart (died 1809) was a United States representative from Pennsylvania. He is known to have completed preparatory studies. From 1789 to 1796, he was elected as a Democratic-Republican to the Sixth Congress to fill the vacancy caused by the death of Thomas Hartley. In 1796, he wrote in the Lancaster Intelligencer to endorse the presidential candidacy of former Pennsylvania Governor, Thomas Jefferson. In 1800, he served as a member of the Pennsylvania State Legislature, signing onto legislation against "foreign importations, and of giving every encouragement, in their power, to our own manufactures."

He was re-elected as a Republican to the Seventh and Eighth Congresses, holding office from January 15, 1801 to March 3, 1805. In 1802, Republicans of York endorsed Mr. Stewart for election to the House of Representatives. He lost the 1804 election to James Kelly 233 to 546. On October 19, 1804, the Lancaster Intelligencer ran an article stating, "The ticket supported by the Federal Republicans in York County, has carried by about 200 votes. The whole Federal ticket has carried in Adams county by a majority of about 300 votes. The district composed of York and Adams counties have elected Mr. Kelly to congress by a majority of about 500 votes over the democrat John Stewart. The democrats of York and Adams are quite chop-fallen." Per the announcement in the Lancaster Intelligencer, "John Stewart, who pretended to represent us in congress for some years past, after a struggle as desperate, as it was impotent, to procure his re-election, is rejected by the people ... Mr. Stewart at his last election, had a majority of 837 votes in York county."

Following his election loss, he gave an address, which was partially transcribed anonymously, including an allusion to an ironic speech condemning the work ethic of "men of talents, lawyers, and rich men," vowing to work in private life to prevent them from being elected. This was taken literally by then-Governor McKean, who responded in a critical letter in the York Recorder. The editors of the Intelligencer accused the governor of misrepresenting Mr. Stewart's words; members of the public accused the newspaper of "leaving out the expressions to which the governor alluded." During these numerous exchanges between the governor, the Intelligencer, and members of the public, Mr. Stewart was on "a Tour to the Western Country." Upon his return in July 1805, he was made aware of the accusations of the governor and subsequent communications in his absence. In an effort to clarify his words, Mr. Stewart published a letter to Gov. McKean in the Intelligencer in the August 13, 1805 edition, harshly criticizing the governor for falling for the misinterpretation and misrepresentation. A week later, Mr. Stewart again wrote Gov. McKean, accusing the governor of scapegoating him to distract from the publishing of private letters exposing the governor's "ill-natured Language and opprobrious Epithets" and to "[secure his] Election, at the Expence of Truth, and of [Mr. Stewart's] Character and Reputation." This was followed by another letter from Mr. Stewart to the governor in the Intelligencer. Mr. Stewart continued his interactions with government officials for years following his last election loss, garnering a mention in the May 5, 1807 edition of the Intelligencer.

The Intelligencer announced Mr. Stewart's death, occurring in Ohio, on September 12, 1809. His possessions were sold through public sale on June 4, 1810. His home and land, including stable, were sold via public sale on March 21, 1812.

U.S. House of Representatives
Preceded by Thomas Hartley	Member of the U.S. House of Representatives from Pennsylvania's 8th congressional district 1801–1803	Succeeded by William Findley
Preceded by John Andre Hanna	Member of the U.S. House of Representatives from Pennsylvania's 6th congressional district 1803–1805	Succeeded by James Kelly
