= Samuel Sitgreaves =

American politician

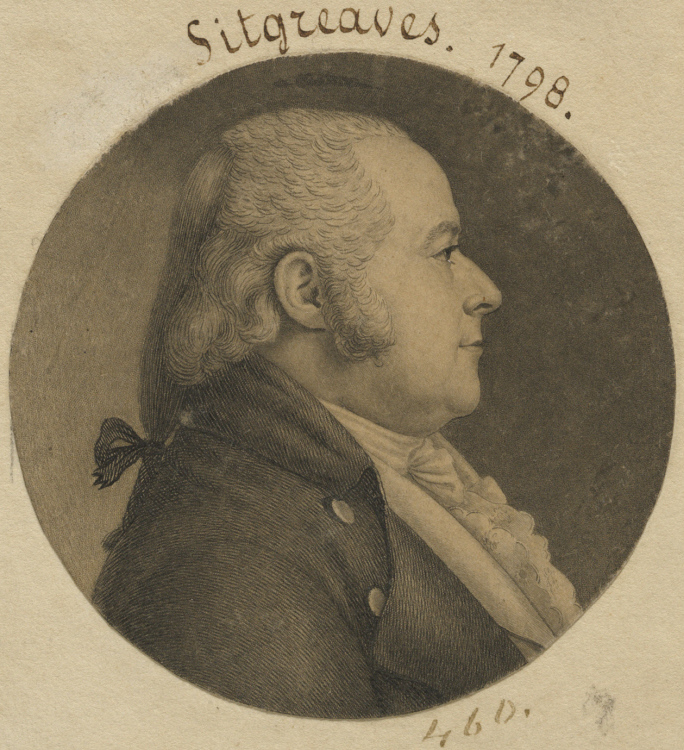
- A 1798 engraving of Sitgreaves now on display at the National Portrait Gallery

Member of the U.S. House of Representatives from Pennsylvania's 4th district
- In office March 4, 1795 – August 29, 1798
- Preceded by: New District
- Succeeded by: John Chapman and Robert Brown

Personal details
- Born: March 16, 1764 Philadelphia, Province of Pennsylvania, British America
- Died: April 4, 1827 (aged 63) Easton, Pennsylvania, U.S.
- Resting place: Easton Cemetery
- Party: Federalist
- Spouse(s): Franconia Allibone (m. 1783); Maria Angelina Kemper (m. 1796)
- Profession: Lawyer

Samuel Sitgreaves (March 16, 1764 – April 4, 1827) was a United States representative from Pennsylvania during the late 18th century.

== Early life and education ==
Sitgreaves was born in Philadelphia in the Province of Pennsylvania. He pursued classical studies, studied law, was admitted to the bar in Philadelphia on September 3, 1783 and began practice in Easton, Pennsylvania in 1786. His sister Julianna married Lewis Allaire Scott, and was the mother of Mayor of Philadelphia John Morin Scott (1789–1858).

== Career ==
Sitgreaves was a delegate to the Pennsylvania Constitutional Convention in 1790, and was elected as a Federalist to the Fourth and Fifth Congresses, serving from March 4, 1795, until his resignation in 1798. Sitgreaves was one of the impeachment managers appointed by the House of Representatives in 1798 to conduct the impeachment proceedings against Senator William Blount. On August 11, 1798, Sitgreaves was appointed United States commissioner to Great Britain under the Jay Treaty, regarding British debt claims arising from the American Revolution.

After his involvement in the Blount affair of 1797, Sitgreaves was considered the Congressional expert on treason. As such, Sitgreaves was asked to lead the prosecution against John Fries and the others responsible for carrying out Fries's Rebellion, an armed tax revolt among Pennsylvania Dutch farmers between 1799 and 1800. Sitgreaves was successful in his prosecution and the jury in the case found the men guilty of treason, but a second trial and an eventual pardon from President John Adams saved the rebels from execution.

Sitgreaves returned to Easton, Pennsylvania, where he served as a burgess from 1804 to 1807, helped to found the Easton Library (now Easton Area Public Library), served as treasurer of Northampton County from 1816 to 1819, and resumed the practice of law. He founded Trinity Episcopal Church in Easton on February 9, 1819 and donated land for the church building which was consecrated by Bishop William White in October 1820. He was president of the Easton Bank from 1815 to 1827, and trustee to Lafayette College from 1826 to 1827.

== Death ==
He died in Easton, Pennsylvania and was interred initially in the churchyard at Trinity Church and later reinterred in Easton Cemetery after its founding in 1849.

U.S. House of Representatives
Preceded by At large on a General ticket: Thomas Fitzsimons; John W. Kittera; Thomas Hartley; Thomas Scott; James Armstrong; Peter G. Muhlenberg; Andrew Gregg; Frederick A.C. Muhlenberg; Daniel Hiester; William Irvine; William Findley; John Smilie and William Montgomery	Member of the U.S. House of Representatives from Pennsylvania's 4th congressional district 1795–1797 alongside: John Richards 1797–1798 alongside: John Chapman	Succeeded by John Chapman and Robert Brown
