= Robert Waln =

American politician

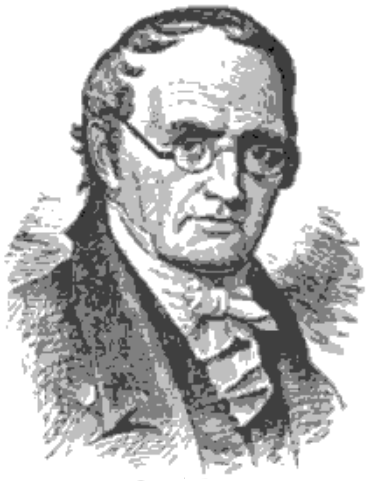

Member of the U.S. House of Representatives from Pennsylvania's 1st district
- In office December 3, 1798 – March 4, 1801
- Preceded by: John Swanwick
- Succeeded by: William Jones

Personal details
- Born: February 22, 1765 Philadelphia, Province of Pennsylvania, British America
- Died: January 24, 1836 (aged 70) Philadelphia, Pennsylvania, U.S.
- Party: Federalist
- Occupation: Businessman, politician

Robert Waln (February 22, 1765 – January 24, 1836) was a United States representative from Pennsylvania. Born in Philadelphia in the Province of Pennsylvania, he received a limited schooling, engaged in mercantile pursuits and in East India and China trade, was a member of the Pennsylvania Legislature for several years, and was a member of the city council of Philadelphia, serving as president of the select council.

Waln was elected as a Federalist to the Fifth Congress to fill the vacancy caused by the death of John Swanwick. He was reelected to the Sixth Congress and served from December 3, 1798, to March 3, 1801. He became interested in the operation of ironworks and during the War of 1812 erected a cotton factory in Trenton, New Jersey. He served as president of the Philadelphia Insurance Co. and as a trustee of the University of Pennsylvania. He died in Philadelphia; interment was in Arch Street Friends Meeting House Burial Ground.

U.S. House of Representatives
Preceded by John Swanwick	Member of the U.S. House of Representatives from Pennsylvania's 1st congressional district 1798–1801	Succeeded by William Jones
