= John A. Hanna =

American politician

John Hanna

Member of the U.S. House of Representatives from Pennsylvania
- In office March 4, 1797 – July 23, 1805
- Preceded by: Samuel Maclay
- Succeeded by: Robert Whitehill
- Constituency: 6th district (1797–1803); 4th district (1803–1805)

Member of the Pennsylvania House of Representatives
- In office 1791

Personal details
- Born: John Andre Hanna; 1762 Flemington, Province of New Jersey, British America
- Died: July 23, 1805 (aged 42–43) Harrisburg, Pennsylvania, U.S.
- Resting place: Mount Kalmia Cemetery
- Party: Democratic-Republican

John Andre Hanna (1762 – July 23, 1805) was an American lawyer, slaveholder and politician who served four terms as a United States representative from Pennsylvania from 1797 to 1805.

Archibald McAllister, John Hanna's grandson, was also a U.S. representative from Pennsylvania.

== Early life and career ==
Born in Flemington in the Province of New Jersey, he received a classical education and graduated from Princeton College in 1782. He was a slaveholder.

He studied law, was admitted to the bar of Lancaster County, Pennsylvania in 1783 and commenced practice in Lancaster. He moved to Harrisburg and was admitted to the Dauphin County bar in 1785. He was a delegate to the State convention to ratify the U.S. Constitution in 1787, and was secretary of the anti-Federal conference in 1788.

== Political career ==
Hanna was a member of the Pennsylvania House of Representatives in 1791, and was elected lieutenant colonel of the Third Battalion of Dauphin County on December 29, 1792. He was appointed brigadier general of Dauphin County Brigade on April 19, 1793 and was in command during the Whisky Rebellion of that year. He was appointed major general of the Sixth Division of Dauphin and Berks Counties on April 23, 1800.

=== Congress ===
Hanna ran for Congress in 1794, losing to Samuel Maclay, but won a rematch in 1796. He was elected to the Fifth and to the four succeeding Congresses and served from March 4, 1797 to his death.

== Death ==
He died in Harrisburg in 1805.

His interment was in Mount Kalmia Cemetery.

== See also ==
- List of members of the United States Congress who died in office (1790–1899)

U.S. House of Representatives
Preceded by Samuel Maclay	Member of the U.S. House of Representatives from Pennsylvania's 6th congressional district 1797–1803	Succeeded by John Stewart
Preceded by Robert Brown and Isaac Van Horne	Member of the U.S. House of Representatives from Pennsylvania's 4th congressional district 1803–1805 alongside: David Bard	Succeeded by David Bard and Robert Whitehill
