= Plural district =

Multi-member electoral district

Plural districts are electoral districts that elect more than one member or representative. Unless staggered terms are used or the separate seats in a district are filled through separate contests, the election contests held in the district elects multiple members. Multi-member districts allow balanced, mixed representation and are used in many proportional representation electoral systems such as list PR and single transferable voting (STV). Other electoral systems that use multi-member districts include plurality block voting and the general ticket system.

Plurality block voting was used in many countries that now use the first past the post voting system. The United Kingdom, the United States, and Canada all used multi-member districts in the past at the national level, and they are used still at the devolved state level in the U.K. (in Scotland, Wales and Northern Ireland) and in many U.S. states.

Every province and territory in Canada (except Nunavut) at one time or another used multi-member districts to elect middle-level legislators. Election systems used included block voting, single transferable voting, limited voting and filling each seat in a separate contest using FPTP or IRV.

== United States ==
In the United States, multi-member electoral districts are typically called plural districts. Currently, these districts exist only in state and local governments, being prohibited at the national level by the Uniform Congressional District Act (UCDA).

Multi-member districts were used at different times to elect the United States House of Representatives, with alternating prohibitions and allowances enacted in history. The first federal (national) ban on multi-member districts for the House was by the 1842 Apportionment Bill. Multi-member districts that were used to elect members to the House reflected geographically defined districts. Multiple members were elected using a contest where each voter had as many votes as seats being filled (block voting) or using distinct ballots, in a separate contest for each seat (conducting simultaneous but separate single-winner contests in the same district using first-past-the-post voting). Occasionally the general ticket election system was used.

=== State governmental systems ===
Several states allow one district to elect more than one representative to the state legislature. Some states that use this districting appear below.

The states below always use multi-member districts.

- Arizona (two in each district)
- New Jersey (two in each district)
- South Dakota (two in each district)
- Washington (two in each district)

Other states use districts of diverse district magnitude. The New Hampshire House of Representatives uses differently sized districts with up to 10 members and block voting.

Illinois's historic use of cumulative voting entailed use of plural districts.

=== United States Congress ===
This is a table of every instance of the use of plural districts in the United States Congress until the first ban, which was enacted in 1842. Instances after are not included.

District magnitude varied from 2 to 4 in many cases.

Congress	State:members elected in state's plural district(s) (name of plural district(s))
3rd	MA:13 (#1, 2, 3, 4) District magnitude ranged from 2 to 4. General ticket election system is used.
4th	PA:2 (#4)
5th	PA:2 (#4)
6th	PA:2 (#4)
7th	PA:2 (#4)
8th	MD:2 (#5), PA:8 (#1, 2, 3, 4)
9th	MD:2 (#5), NY:2 (#2 combined with 3), PA:8 (#1, 2, 3, 4)
10th	MD:2 (#5), NY:2 (#2 combined with 3), PA:8 (#1, 2, 3, 4)
11th	MD:2 (#5), NY:4 (#2, 6), PA:8 (#1, 2, 3, 4)
12th	MD:2 (#5), NY:4 (#2, 6), PA:8 (#1, 2, 3, 4)
13th	MD:2 (#5), NY:12 (#1, 2, 12, 15, 20, 21), PA:14 (#1, 2, 3, 5, 6, 10), NJ:6 (#1, 2, 3)
14th	MD:2 (#5), NY:12 (#1, 2, 12, 15, 20, 21), PA:14 (#1, 2, 3, 5, 6, 10)
15th	MD:2 (#5), NY:12 (#1, 2, 12, 15, 20, 21), PA:14 (#1, 2, 3, 5, 6, 10)
16th	MD:2 (#5), NY:12 (#1, 2, 12, 15, 20, 21), PA:14 (#1, 2, 3, 5, 6, 10)
17th	MD:2 (#5), NY:10 (#1, 2, 12, 15, 20), PA:14 (#1, 2, 3, 5, 6, 10)
18th	MD:2 (#5), NY:7 (#3, 20, 26), PA:14 (#4, 7, 8, 9, 11, 16)
19th	MD:2 (#5), NY:7 (#3, 20, 26), PA:14 (#4, 7, 8, 9, 11, 16)
20th	MD:2 (#5), NY:7 (#3, 20, 26), PA:14 (#4, 7, 8, 9, 11, 16)
21st	MD:2 (#5), NY:7 (#3, 20, 26), PA:14 (#4, 7, 8, 9, 11, 16)
22nd	MD:2 (#5), NY:7 (#3, 20, 26), PA:14 (#4, 7, 8, 9, 11, 16)
23rd	NY:12 (#3, 8, 17, 22, 23) (district magnitude ranged from 2 to 4); PA:5 (#2, 4)
24th	MD:2 (#4), NY:12 (#3, 8, 17, 22, 23), PA:5 (#2, 4)
25th	MD:2 (#4), NY:12 (#3, 8, 17, 22, 23), PA:5 (#2, 4)
26th	MD:2 (#4), NY:12 (#3, 8, 17, 22, 23), PA:5 (#2, 4)
27th	MD:2 (#4), NY:12 (#3, 8, 17, 22, 23), PA:5 (#2, 4)

== See also ==
Theory and principles

- Electoral district § District magnitude, the number of members per district

Compatible with

- Block voting, voter casts multiple votes in contest where multiple members are returned, on plurality basis
- First-past-the-post, a vote/ballot for one member to be returned, on a plurality basis
  - Multiple ballots, one per designated seat, using system above
- Proportional representation, any voting system that seeks to result in representation in proportion to the number of respective votes cast overall in an election, or in a multi-member district
- General ticket – the return of a single winning party or team of candidates in an electoral district. Voter casts one vote. multiple members elected.
- Representation at-large – a representative/territory being undivided for every purpose as to a representative body. The most-populous at large districts/regions elect multiple members (some states elect just one member).
- Multi-member districts
- State constitutions in the United States
- State legislatures
- State legislature (United States)
- List of United States state legislatures

== Sources ==
- Martis, Kenneth C. (1982). The Historical Atlas of United States Congressional Districts. New York: Macmillan Publishing Company.
