= Robert Brown (Pennsylvania politician) =

American politician

Robert Brown (December 25, 1744 – February 26, 1823) was a United States representative from Pennsylvania. Brown was born in Weaversville in East Allen Township, Pennsylvania, he attended the common schools and was apprenticed to the blacksmith trade.

== Career ==
=== American Revolutionary War ===
At the beginning of the American Revolutionary War, he was commissioned first lieutenant in the Pennsylvania "Flying Camp". On September 10, 1776, he was captured at the surrender of Fort Washington on November 16, 1776, and worked at the blacksmith trade while a prisoner. He was later put aboard the prison ship Judith and was subsequently imprisoned in New York City's Old City Hall. He was paroled on board ship December 10, 1777.

=== Pennsylvania Senate and Congress ===
Brown was a member of the Pennsylvania State Senate from 1783 to 1787, and was elected as a Democratic-Republican to the Fifth Congress to fill the vacancy caused by the resignation of Samuel Sitgreaves. He was reelected to the Sixth and to seven succeeding Congresses, serving from December 4, 1798 to March 3, 1815. He was not a candidate for renomination in 1814, and retired from public life and lived on his farm.

== Death ==
In 1823, Brown died near the Weaversville section of present-day East Allen Township, Pennsylvania. He is buried in Horner's Cemetery located beside Northampton God's Missionary Church in East Allen Township in Northampton County, Pennsylvania.

U.S. House of Representatives
| Preceded by John Chapman and Samuel Sitgreaves | Member of the U.S. House of Representatives from Pennsylvania's 4th congressional district 1798–1803 1798–1799 alongside: John Chapman; 1799–1801 alongside: Peter G. Muhlenberg; 1801–1803 alongside: Isaac Van Horne | Succeeded by John Andre Hanna and David Bard |
| Preceded by Michael Leib | Member of the U.S. House of Representatives from Pennsylvania's 2nd congressional district 1803–1813 1803–1805 alongside: Isaac Van Horne and Frederick Conrad; 1805–1807 alongside: John Pugh and Frederick Conrad; 1807–1809 alongside: John Pugh and William Milnor; 1809–1811 alongside: William Milnor and John Ross; 1811–1813 alongside: Jonathan Roberts and William Rodman | Succeeded by Jonathan Roberts and Roger Davis |
| Preceded by William Crawford | Member of the U.S. House of Representatives from Pennsylvania's 6th congressional district 1813–1815 alongside: Samuel D. Ingham | Succeeded by Samuel D. Ingham and John Ross |
