= 1806–07 United States House of Representatives elections =

House elections for the 10th U.S. Congress

- April 29, 1806 – August 4, 1807

All 142 seats in the United States House of Representatives 72 seats needed for a majority
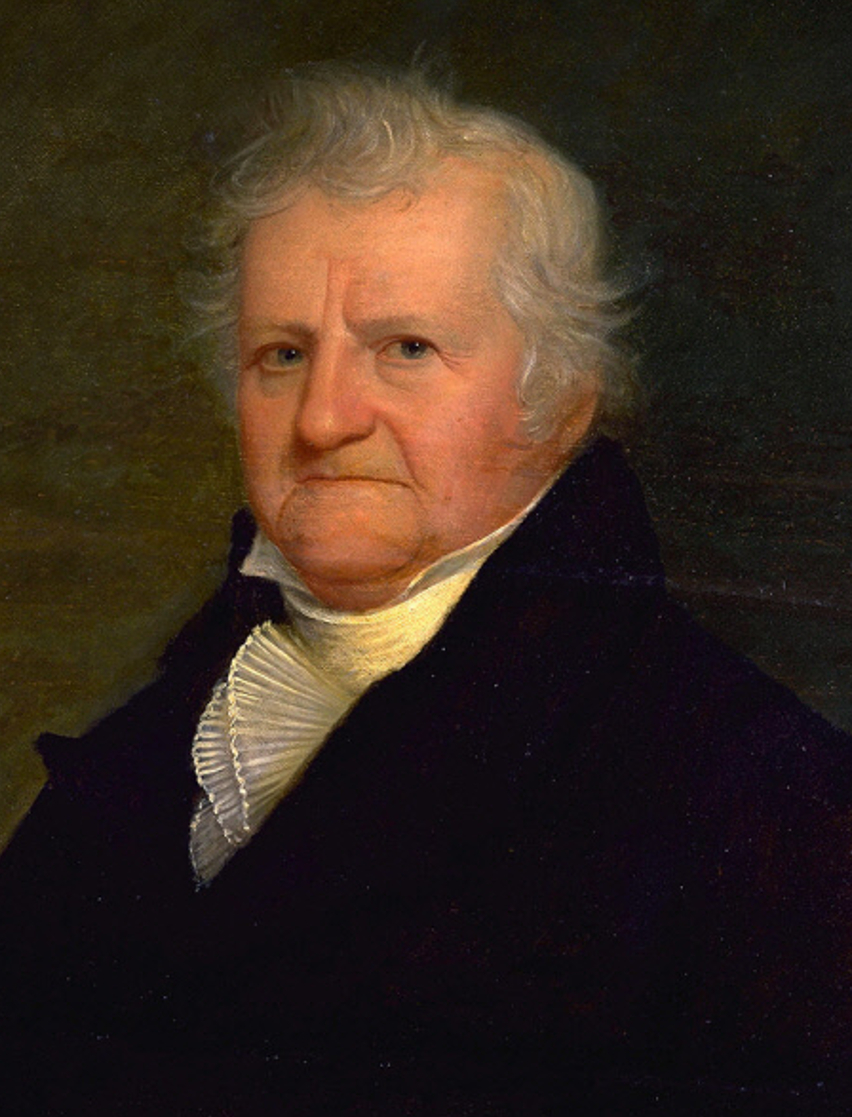

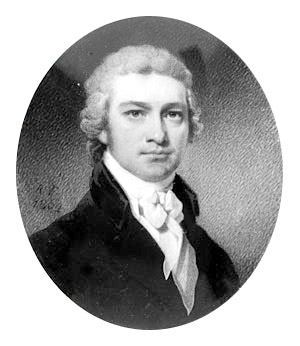
	Majority party	Minority party
Leader	Joseph Bradley Varnum	Charles Goldsborough
Party	Democratic-Republican	Federalist
Leader's seat	Massachusetts 4th	Maryland 8th
Last election	114 seats	28 seats
Seats won	116	26
Seat change	▲2	▼2
- Results: Federalist hold Federalist gain Democratic-Republican hold Democratic-Republican gain Dissident Republican hold Dissident Republican Gain; Undistricted
Speaker before election
Nathaniel Macon
Democratic-Republican
Elected Speaker
Joseph Bradley Varnum
Democratic-Republican

The 1806–07 United States House of Representatives elections were held on various dates in various states between April 29, 1806 (in New York) and August 4, 1807 (in Tennessee). Each state set its own date for its elections to the House of Representatives before the first session of the 10th United States Congress convened on October 26, 1807. They occurred during Thomas Jefferson's second term. Elections were held for all 142 seats, representing 17 states.

The Democratic-Republicans continued to build on their huge supermajority. They were actually able to take over two more seats than they had in the previous Congress, which they controlled by a margin of better than three to one. Commitment to agrarian policy allowed the Democratic-Republicans to dominate rural districts, which represented the bulk of the nation. On the other hand, supporters of the Federalists, even in their traditional base of support in the urban centers of coastal New England, continued to lament the ineffectiveness of their party and its lack of electoral appeal.

With a net change of 2 seats between the two parties, this was the smallest net change in US history in the House of Representatives until 2024.

== Election summaries ==
↓
116	26
Democratic-Republican	Federalist

State	Type	Date	Total seats	Democratic- Republican		Federalist	
State	Type	Date	Total seats	Seats	Change	Seats	Change
New York	Districts	April 29 – May 1, 1806	17	15	Steady	2	Steady
Kentucky	Districts	August 4, 1806	6	6	Steady	0	Steady
North Carolina	Districts	August 15, 1806	12	11	▼1	1	▲1
New Hampshire	At-large	August 25, 1806	5	5	▲5	0	▼5
Rhode Island	At-large	August 26, 1806 (Note: Rhode Island required a majority for election, which was not met for one seat requiring a second ballot.)	2	2	Steady	0	Steady
Vermont	Districts	September 2, 1806	4	2	Steady	2	Steady
Connecticut	At-large	September 15, 1806	7	0	Steady	7	Steady
Georgia	At-large	October 6, 1806	4	4	Steady	0	Steady
Maryland	Districts	October 6, 1806	9	6	▼1	3	▲1
Delaware	At-large	October 7, 1806	1	0	Steady	1	Steady
South Carolina	Districts	October 13–14, 1806	8	8	Steady	0	Steady
Ohio	At-large	October 14, 1806	1	1	Steady	0	Steady
Pennsylvania	Districts	October 14, 1806	18	15	▼2	3	▲2
New Jersey	At-large	October 14–15, 1806	6	6	Steady	0	Steady
Massachusetts	Districts	November 3, 1806	17	11	▲1	6	▼1
Late elections (After the March 4, 1807 beginning of the next Congress)
Virginia	Districts	April 1807	22	21	Steady	1	Steady
Tennessee	Districts	August 3–4, 1807	3	3	Steady	0	Steady
Total			142	116 81.7%	▲2	26 18.3%	▼2

House seats
Dem-Republican	81.69%
Federalist	18.31%

== Special elections ==
There were special elections in 1806 and 1807 during the 9th United States Congress and 10th United States Congress.

Elections are sorted here by date then district.

=== 9th Congress ===
District	Incumbent			This race	
District	Member / Delegate	Party	First elected	Results	Candidates
North Carolina 10 "Rowan district"	Nathaniel Alexander	Democratic- Republican	1803	Incumbent resigned November 1805 after being elected Governor of North Carolina. New member elected. Democratic-Republican hold. Successor seated February 24, 1806. Winner was later elected to the next term; see below.	▌ ✓ Evan S. Alexander (Democratic-Republican); ▌Robert Locke (Democratic-Republican) (Note: Source does not give numbers of votes or has incomplete data)
Connecticut at-large	John Cotton Smith	Federalist	1800 (special)	Incumbent resigned sometime in August 1806. New member elected September 15, 1806 and seated December 1, 1806. Federalist hold. Winner declined to run for the next term; see below.	▌ ✓ Theodore Dwight (Federalist); [data missing]
Georgia at-large	Joseph Bryan	Democratic- Republican	1803 (special)	Incumbent resigned sometime in 1806. New member elected September 15, 1806 and seated September 1, 1806. Democratic-Republican hold. Winner was later elected to the next term; see below.	▌ ✓ Dennis Smelt (Democratic-Republican) 51.9%; ▌George M. Troup (Unknown) 42.6%; ▌Buckner Harris (Unknown) 5.5%; Others <0.1%
Georgia at-large	Thomas Spalding	Democratic- Republican	1805 (contested)	Incumbent resigned sometime in 1806. New member elected before December 6, 1806, and seated January 26, 1807. Democratic-Republican hold. Winner had already been elected to the next term; see below.	▌ ✓ William W. Bibb (Democratic-Republican) 74.2%; ▌David Creswell (Unknown) 25.8%
Maryland 7	Joseph H. Nicholson	Democratic- Republican	1798 (special)	Incumbent resigned March 1, 1806. New member elected October 4, 1806 and seated December 3, 1806. Democratic-Republican hold. Winner also elected to the next term; see below.	▌ ✓ Edward Lloyd (Democratic-Republican) 83.8%; ▌James Brown (Unknown) 16.2%
Virginia 13	Christopher H. Clark	Democratic- Republican	1804 (special)	Incumbent resigned July 1, 1806. New member elected in early November 1806 and seated December 1, 1806. Democratic-Republican hold. Winner later elected to the next term; see below.	▌ ✓ William A. Burwell (Democratic-Republican); ▌Henry Callaway (Unknown)
Pennsylvania 1	Michael Leib	Democratic- Republican	1798	Incumbent resigned February 14, 1806. New member elected November 27, 1806 and seated December 8, 1806. Democratic-Republican hold.	▌ ✓ John Porter (Democratic-Republican); [data missing]
Orleans Territory at-large	None (new district)			New delegate elected December 1, 1806.	▌ ✓ Daniel Clarke (Independent); [data missing]

=== 10th Congress ===
District	Incumbent			This race	
District	Member	Party	First elected	Results	Candidates
South Carolina 6	Levi Casey	Democratic- Republican	1803	Incumbent/member-elect died February 3, 1807. Seat remained unfilled in the 9th Congress. New member elected June 1–2, 1807 and seated October 26, 1807. Democratic-Republican hold.	▌ ✓ Joseph Calhoun (Democratic-Republican); [data missing]
Massachusetts 12 "Berkshire district"	Barnabas Bidwell	Democratic- Republican	1804	Incumbent resigned July 13, 1807 to become Massachusetts Attorney General. New member elected in 1807 and seated November 2, 1807. Democratic-Republican hold.	▌ ✓ Ezekiel Bacon (Democratic-Republican) 84.4%; ▌Daniel Dewey (Federalist) 10.8%; Scattering 4.8%
Delaware at-large	James M. Broom	Federalist	1804	Incumbent/Representative-elect resigned in 1807. New member elected October 6, 1807 and seated December 2, 1807. Federalist hold.	▌ ✓ Nicholas Van Dyke (Federalist) 51.7%; ▌John Dickinson (Democratic-Republican) 48.3%; Scattering <0.1%

== Connecticut ==
Connecticut elected its members on September 15, 1806.

District	Incumbent			This race	
District	Member	Party	First elected	Results	Candidates
Connecticut at-large 7 seats on a general ticket	Benjamin Tallmadge	Federalist	1801 (special)	Incumbent re-elected.	▌ ✓ Benjamin Tallmadge (Federalist); ▌ ✓ Jonathan O. Moseley (Federalist); ▌ ✓ Epaphroditus Champion (Federalist); ▌ ✓ Timothy Pitkin (Federalist); ▌ ✓ Lewis B. Sturges (Federalist); ▌ ✓ John Davenport (Federalist); ▌ ✓ Samuel W. Dana (Federalist); ▌Sylvanus Backus (Federalist); ▌Asa Bacon (Federalist); ▌John Caldwell (Federalist); ▌Sylvester Gilbert (Federalist); ▌Uriel Holmes (Federalist); ▌Ebenezer Huntington (Federalist); ▌Lyman Law (Federalist); ▌Samuel B. Sherwood (Federalist); ▌John Cotton Smith (Federalist); ▌Nathaniel Terry (Federalist); ▌Noah Webster (Federalist)
Connecticut at-large 7 seats on a general ticket	Jonathan O. Moseley	Federalist	1804	Incumbent re-elected.	
Connecticut at-large 7 seats on a general ticket	John Cotton Smith	Federalist	1800 (special)	Incumbent resigned in August 1806. Federalist hold. Successor was not elected to finish the current term; see above.	
Connecticut at-large 7 seats on a general ticket	Timothy Pitkin	Federalist	1805 (special)	Incumbent re-elected.	
Connecticut at-large 7 seats on a general ticket	Lewis B. Sturges	Federalist	1805 (special)	Incumbent re-elected.	
Connecticut at-large 7 seats on a general ticket	John Davenport	Federalist	1798	Incumbent re-elected.	
Connecticut at-large 7 seats on a general ticket	Samuel W. Dana	Federalist	1798	Incumbent re-elected.	

== Delaware ==
Delaware elected its member October 7, 1806.

District	Incumbent			This race	
District	Member	Party	First elected	Results	Candidates
Delaware at-large	James M. Broom	Federalist	1805 (special)	Incumbent re-elected. Incumbent resigned before the next Congress and declined the seat, leading to a special election; see above.	▌ ✓ James M. Broom (Federalist) 60.5%; ▌Thomas Fitzgerald (Democratic-Republican) 21.3%; ▌Joseph Haslet (Democratic-Republican) 9.8%; ▌Thomas Montgomery (Democratic-Republican) 8.3%

== Georgia ==
Georgia elected its members October 6, 1806.

District	Incumbent			This race	
District	Member	Party	First elected	Results	Candidates
Georgia at-large 4 seats on a general ticket	Dennis Smelt	Democratic- Republican	1806 (special)	Incumbent re-elected.	▌ ✓ Dennis Smelt (Democratic-Republican) 18.4%; ▌ ✓ George Troup (Democratic-Republican) 16.7%; ▌ ✓ William W. Bibb (Democratic-Republican) 15.3%; ▌ ✓ Howell Cobb (Democratic-Republican) 12.8%; ▌Elijah Clarke (Democratic-Republican) 12.5%; ▌William Barnett (Democratic-Republican) 7.2%; ▌Thomas Carr (Unknown) 6.2%; ▌James Simms (Unknown) 6.2%; ▌Thomas Spalding (Democratic-Republican) 3.1%; ▌Obediah Jones (Unknown) 1.0%; ▌Buckner Harris (Unknown) 0.6%
Georgia at-large 4 seats on a general ticket	David Meriwether	Democratic- Republican	1804	Incumbent retired. Democratic-Republican hold.	▌ ✓ Dennis Smelt (Democratic-Republican) 18.4%; ▌ ✓ George Troup (Democratic-Republican) 16.7%; ▌ ✓ William W. Bibb (Democratic-Republican) 15.3%; ▌ ✓ Howell Cobb (Democratic-Republican) 12.8%; ▌Elijah Clarke (Democratic-Republican) 12.5%; ▌William Barnett (Democratic-Republican) 7.2%; ▌Thomas Carr (Unknown) 6.2%; ▌James Simms (Unknown) 6.2%; ▌Thomas Spalding (Democratic-Republican) 3.1%; ▌Obediah Jones (Unknown) 1.0%; ▌Buckner Harris (Unknown) 0.6%
Georgia at-large 4 seats on a general ticket	Thomas Spalding	Democratic- Republican	1805 (contest)	Incumbent lost re-election. Democratic-Republican hold. Incumbent resigned in 1806, leading to a special election; see above.	▌ ✓ Dennis Smelt (Democratic-Republican) 18.4%; ▌ ✓ George Troup (Democratic-Republican) 16.7%; ▌ ✓ William W. Bibb (Democratic-Republican) 15.3%; ▌ ✓ Howell Cobb (Democratic-Republican) 12.8%; ▌Elijah Clarke (Democratic-Republican) 12.5%; ▌William Barnett (Democratic-Republican) 7.2%; ▌Thomas Carr (Unknown) 6.2%; ▌James Simms (Unknown) 6.2%; ▌Thomas Spalding (Democratic-Republican) 3.1%; ▌Obediah Jones (Unknown) 1.0%; ▌Buckner Harris (Unknown) 0.6%
Georgia at-large 4 seats on a general ticket	Peter Early	Democratic- Republican	1804	Incumbent retired. Democratic-Republican hold.	▌ ✓ Dennis Smelt (Democratic-Republican) 18.4%; ▌ ✓ George Troup (Democratic-Republican) 16.7%; ▌ ✓ William W. Bibb (Democratic-Republican) 15.3%; ▌ ✓ Howell Cobb (Democratic-Republican) 12.8%; ▌Elijah Clarke (Democratic-Republican) 12.5%; ▌William Barnett (Democratic-Republican) 7.2%; ▌Thomas Carr (Unknown) 6.2%; ▌James Simms (Unknown) 6.2%; ▌Thomas Spalding (Democratic-Republican) 3.1%; ▌Obediah Jones (Unknown) 1.0%; ▌Buckner Harris (Unknown) 0.6%

== Indiana Territory ==
See Non-voting delegates, below.

== Kentucky ==
Kentucky elected its members August 4, 1806.

District	Incumbent			This race	
District	Member	Party	First elected	Results	Candidates
Kentucky 1	Matthew Lyon	Democratic-Republican	1797 (Vermont); 1803	Incumbent re-elected.	▌ ✓ Matthew Lyon (Democratic-Republican) 57.9%; ▌David Walker (Democratic-Republican) 42.1%
Kentucky 2	John Boyle	Democratic-Republican	1803	Incumbent re-elected.	▌ ✓ John Boyle (Democratic-Republican)
Kentucky 3	Matthew Walton	Democratic-Republican	1803	Incumbent retired. Democratic-Republican hold.	▌ ✓ John Rowan (Democratic-Republican) 55.8%; ▌Stephen Ormsby (Democratic-Republican) 44.2%
Kentucky 4	Thomas Sandford	Democratic-Republican	1803	Incumbent lost re-election. Democratic-Republican hold.	▌ ✓ Richard M. Johnson (Democratic-Republican) 42.5%; ▌Thomas Sandford (Democratic-Republican) 30.2%; ▌James Moore (Unknown) 27.3%
Kentucky 5	John Fowler	Democratic-Republican	1797	Incumbent retired. Democratic-Republican hold.	▌ ✓ Benjamin Howard (Democratic-Republican); Uncontested
Kentucky 6	George M. Bedinger	Democratic-Republican	1803	Incumbent retired. Democratic-Republican hold.	▌ ✓ Joseph Desha (Democratic-Republican)

== Maryland ==
Maryland elected its members October 6, 1806.

District	Incumbent			This race	
District	Member	Party	First elected	Results	Candidates (Note: Only candidates with at least 1% of the vote are listed.)
Maryland 1	John Campbell	Federalist	1801	Incumbent re-elected.	▌ ✓ John Campbell (Federalist) 99.9%
Maryland 2	Leonard Covington	Democratic-Republican	1804	Incumbent lost re-election. Democratic-Republican hold.	▌ ✓ Archibald Van Horne (Democratic-Republican) 58.4%; ▌Leonard Covington (Democratic-Republican) 41.5%
Maryland 3	Patrick Magruder	Democratic-Republican	1801	Incumbent lost re-election. Federalist gain.	▌ ✓ Philip B. Key (Federalist) 53.3%; ▌Patrick Magruder (Democratic-Republican) 46.7%
Maryland 4	Roger Nelson	Democratic-Republican	1804 (special)	Incumbent re-elected.	▌ ✓ Roger Nelson (Democratic-Republican) 96.4%; ▌Nathaniel Rochester (D-R Quid) 3.0%
Maryland 5 Plural district with 2 seats	Nicholas R. Moore	Democratic-Republican	1803	Incumbent re-elected.	▌ ✓ Nicholas R. Moore (Democratic-Republican) 44.5%; ▌ ✓ William McCreery (Democratic-Republican) 25.7%; ▌Joshua Barney (Quid) 14.9%; ▌John Scott (Federalist) 14.9%
Maryland 5 Plural district with 2 seats	William McCreery	Democratic-Republican	1803	Incumbent re-elected.	▌ ✓ Nicholas R. Moore (Democratic-Republican) 44.5%; ▌ ✓ William McCreery (Democratic-Republican) 25.7%; ▌Joshua Barney (Quid) 14.9%; ▌John Scott (Federalist) 14.9%
Maryland 6	John Archer	Democratic-Republican	1801	Incumbent lost re-election. Democratic-Republican hold.	▌ ✓ John Montgomery (Democratic-Republican) 50.2%; ▌John Archer (D-R Quid) 48.7%; ▌Samuel Sutton (Unknown) 1.0%
Maryland 7	Joseph H. Nicholson	Democratic-Republican	1798 (special)	Incumbent resigned March 1, 1806. Democratic-Republican hold. Winner had already been elected to finish the current term; see above.	▌ ✓ Edward Lloyd (Democratic-Republican) 81.1%; ▌James Brown (D-R Quid) 18.8%
Maryland 8	Charles Goldsborough	Federalist	1804	Incumbent re-elected.	▌ ✓ Charles Goldsborough (Federalist) 68.8%; ▌Philip Quinton (D-R Quid) 31.1%

== Massachusetts ==
Massachusetts elected its members November 3, 1806.

District	Incumbent			This race	
District	Member	Party	First elected	Results	Candidates
Massachusetts 1 "Suffolk district"	Josiah Quincy	Federalist	1804	Incumbent re-elected.	▌ ✓ Josiah Quincy (Federalist) 57.7%; ▌James Prince (Democratic-Republican) 42.2%
Massachusetts 2 "Essex South district"	Jacob Crowninshield	Democratic- Republican	1803	Incumbent re-elected.	▌ ✓ Jacob Crowninshield (Democratic-Republican) 54.8%; ▌Samuel Putnam (Federalist) 45.0%
Massachusetts 3 "Essex North district"	Jeremiah Nelson	Federalist	1804	Incumbent retired. Federalist hold.	▌ ✓ Edward St. Loe Livermore (Federalist) 67.6%; ▌Thomas Kitteridge (Democratic-Republican) 32.4%
Massachusetts 4 "Middlesex district"	Joseph Bradley Varnum	Democratic- Republican	1794	Incumbent re-elected.	▌ ✓ Joseph Bradley Varnum (Democratic-Republican) 74.0%; ▌Ebenezer Bridgely (Federalist) 25.1%
Massachusetts 5 "Hampshire South district"	William Ely	Federalist	1804	Incumbent re-elected.	▌ ✓ William Ely (Federalist) 57.1%; ▌Samuel Fowler (Democratic-Republican) 38.5%; ▌William Eaton (Federalist) 4.4%
Massachusetts 6 "Hampshire North district"	Samuel Taggart	Federalist	1803	Incumbent re-elected.	▌ ✓ Samuel Taggart (Federalist) 64.4%; ▌Solomon Snead (Democratic-Republican) 35.6%
Massachusetts 7 "Plymouth district"	Joseph Barker	Democratic- Republican	1804	Incumbent re-elected.	▌ ✓ Joseph Barker (Democratic-Republican) 60.8%; ▌Nahum Mitchell (Federalist) 38.4%
Massachusetts 8 "Barnstable district"	Isaiah L. Green	Democratic- Republican	1804	Incumbent re-elected.	▌ ✓ Isaiah L. Green (Democratic-Republican) 63.4%; ▌Wendall Davis (Federalist) 34.6%; Others 2.0%
Massachusetts 9 "Bristol district"	Phanuel Bishop	Democratic- Republican	1798	Incumbent retired. Democratic-Republican hold.	▌ ✓ Josiah Dean (Democratic-Republican) 55.1%; ▌Nicholas Tillinghast (Federalist) 43.1%; ▌Nathaniel Morton (Unknown) 1.6%
Massachusetts 10 "Worcester South district"	Seth Hastings	Federalist	1800 (special)	Incumbent retired. Federalist hold.	▌ ✓ Jabez Upham (Federalist) 53.9%; ▌Edward Bangs (Democratic-Republican) 45.4%
Massachusetts 11 "Worcester North district"	William Stedman	Federalist	1803	Incumbent re-elected.	▌ ✓ William Stedman (Federalist) 63.6%; ▌John Whiting (Democratic-Republican) 36.0%
Massachusetts 12 "Berkshire district"	Barnabas Bidwell	Democratic- Republican	1804	Incumbent re-elected.	▌ ✓ Barnabas Bidwell (Democratic-Republican) 59.9%; ▌Daniel Dewey (Federalist) 40.1%
Massachusetts 13 "Norfolk district"	Ebenezer Seaver	Democratic- Republican	1803	Incumbent re-elected.	▌ ✓ Ebenezer Seaver (Democratic-Republican) 65.3%; ▌Edward H. Robbins (Federalist) 34.7%
Massachusetts 14 "York district" District of Maine	Richard Cutts	Democratic- Republican	1801	Incumbent re-elected.	▌ ✓ Richard Cutts (Democratic-Republican) 55.9%; ▌Joseph Leland (Federalist) 25.8%; ▌Joseph Bartlett (Democratic-Republican) 18.4%
Massachusetts 15 "Cumberland district" District of Maine	Peleg Wadsworth	Federalist	1792	Incumbent retired. Democratic-Republican gain.	▌ ✓ Daniel Ilsley (Democratic-Republican) 52.5%; ▌Ezekiel Whitman (Federalist) 47.5%
Massachusetts 16 "Lincoln district" District of Maine	Orchard Cook	Democratic- Republican	1804	Incumbent re-elected.	▌ ✓ Orchard Cook (Democratic-Republican) 55.9%; ▌Mark L. Hill (Federalist) 44.1%
Massachusetts 17 "Kennebec district" District of Maine	John Chandler	Democratic- Republican	1804	Incumbent re-elected.	▌ ✓ John Chandler (Democratic-Republican) 76.5%; ▌John Crosby (Unknown) 20.6%; ▌Benjamin Whitwell (Federalist) 2.9%

== Mississippi Territory ==
See Non-voting delegates, below.

== New Hampshire ==
New Hampshire elected its members August 25, 1806.

District	Incumbent			This race	
District	Member	Party	First elected	Results	Candidates
New Hampshire at-large 5 seats on a general ticket	Silas Betton	Federalist	1802	Incumbent lost re-election. Democratic-Republican gain.	▌ ✓ Jedediah K. Smith (Democratic-Republican) 12.2%; ▌ ✓ Clement Storer (Democratic-Republican) 12.1%; ▌ ✓ Peter Carleton (Democratic-Republican) 12.1%; ▌ ✓ Francis Gardner (Democratic-Republican) 12.0%; ▌ ✓ Daniel M. Durell (Democratic-Republican) 10.9%; ▌Samuel Tenney (Federalist) 7.8%; ▌Caleb Ellis (Federalist) 7.7%; ▌David Hough (Federalist) 7.6%; ▌Thomas W. Thompson (Federalist) 6.0%; ▌Silas Betton (Federalist) 6.0%; ▌John Wheeler (Federalist) 2.0%; ▌Timothy Farrar (Federalist) 1.7%; Others 2.0%
New Hampshire at-large 5 seats on a general ticket	Thomas W. Thompson	Federalist	1804	Incumbent lost re-election. Democratic-Republican gain.	
New Hampshire at-large 5 seats on a general ticket	Samuel Tenney	Federalist	1800	Incumbent lost re-election. Democratic-Republican gain.	
New Hampshire at-large 5 seats on a general ticket	David Hough	Federalist	1802	Incumbent lost re-election. Democratic-Republican gain.	
New Hampshire at-large 5 seats on a general ticket	Caleb Ellis	Federalist	1804	Incumbent lost re-election. Democratic-Republican gain.	

== New Jersey ==
New Jersey elected its members October 14–15, 1806. The Federalists ran a mixed ticket consisting of 2 Federalists (Aaron Ogden and John Beatty) and 4 Democratic-Republicans (William Helms, Ebenezer Elmer, George Maxwell, and Adam Boyd), one of whom (William Helms) was also on the Democratic-Republican ticket. The Federalists capitalized on resentment over the replacement on the official Democratic-Republican ticket of Ebenezer Elmer, from South Jersey, with Thomas Newbold from Monmouth County and the retention of James Sloan. This ticket was formed too late to gain sufficient support, but the Federalists did do much better in state elections that year than they had in previous elections.

District	Incumbent			This race	
District	Member	Party	First elected	Results	Candidates
New Jersey at-large 6 seats on a general ticket	William Helms	Democratic-Republican	1800	Incumbent re-elected.	▌ ✓ William Helms (Democratic-Republican) (Note: Also member of the official Federalist ticket) 14.9%; ▌ ✓ Thomas Newbold (Democratic-Republican) 12.4%; ▌ ✓ Henry Southard (Democratic-Republican) 12.4%; ▌ ✓ Ezra Darby (Democratic-Republican) 11.9%; ▌ ✓ John Lambert (Democratic-Republican) 11.8%; ▌ ✓ James Sloan (Democratic-Republican) 11.2%; ▌Aaron Ogden (Federalist) 5.9%; ▌Ebenezer Elmer (Federalist) 5.8%; ▌John Beatty (Federalist) 5.3%; ▌George C. Maxwell (Democratic-Republican) 3.8%; ▌Adam Boyd (Democratic-Republican) 3.4%
New Jersey at-large 6 seats on a general ticket	Ebenezer Elmer	Democratic-Republican	1800	Incumbent lost re-election. Democratic-Republican hold.	▌ ✓ William Helms (Democratic-Republican) 14.9%; ▌ ✓ Thomas Newbold (Democratic-Republican) 12.4%; ▌ ✓ Henry Southard (Democratic-Republican) 12.4%; ▌ ✓ Ezra Darby (Democratic-Republican) 11.9%; ▌ ✓ John Lambert (Democratic-Republican) 11.8%; ▌ ✓ James Sloan (Democratic-Republican) 11.2%; ▌Aaron Ogden (Federalist) 5.9%; ▌Ebenezer Elmer (Federalist) 5.8%; ▌John Beatty (Federalist) 5.3%; ▌George C. Maxwell (Democratic-Republican) 3.8%; ▌Adam Boyd (Democratic-Republican) 3.4%
New Jersey at-large 6 seats on a general ticket	Henry Southard	Democratic-Republican	1800	Incumbent re-elected.	▌ ✓ William Helms (Democratic-Republican) 14.9%; ▌ ✓ Thomas Newbold (Democratic-Republican) 12.4%; ▌ ✓ Henry Southard (Democratic-Republican) 12.4%; ▌ ✓ Ezra Darby (Democratic-Republican) 11.9%; ▌ ✓ John Lambert (Democratic-Republican) 11.8%; ▌ ✓ James Sloan (Democratic-Republican) 11.2%; ▌Aaron Ogden (Federalist) 5.9%; ▌Ebenezer Elmer (Federalist) 5.8%; ▌John Beatty (Federalist) 5.3%; ▌George C. Maxwell (Democratic-Republican) 3.8%; ▌Adam Boyd (Democratic-Republican) 3.4%
New Jersey at-large 6 seats on a general ticket	Ezra Darby	Democratic-Republican	1804	Incumbent re-elected.	▌ ✓ William Helms (Democratic-Republican) 14.9%; ▌ ✓ Thomas Newbold (Democratic-Republican) 12.4%; ▌ ✓ Henry Southard (Democratic-Republican) 12.4%; ▌ ✓ Ezra Darby (Democratic-Republican) 11.9%; ▌ ✓ John Lambert (Democratic-Republican) 11.8%; ▌ ✓ James Sloan (Democratic-Republican) 11.2%; ▌Aaron Ogden (Federalist) 5.9%; ▌Ebenezer Elmer (Federalist) 5.8%; ▌John Beatty (Federalist) 5.3%; ▌George C. Maxwell (Democratic-Republican) 3.8%; ▌Adam Boyd (Democratic-Republican) 3.4%
New Jersey at-large 6 seats on a general ticket	John Lambert	Democratic-Republican	1804	Incumbent re-elected.	▌ ✓ William Helms (Democratic-Republican) 14.9%; ▌ ✓ Thomas Newbold (Democratic-Republican) 12.4%; ▌ ✓ Henry Southard (Democratic-Republican) 12.4%; ▌ ✓ Ezra Darby (Democratic-Republican) 11.9%; ▌ ✓ John Lambert (Democratic-Republican) 11.8%; ▌ ✓ James Sloan (Democratic-Republican) 11.2%; ▌Aaron Ogden (Federalist) 5.9%; ▌Ebenezer Elmer (Federalist) 5.8%; ▌John Beatty (Federalist) 5.3%; ▌George C. Maxwell (Democratic-Republican) 3.8%; ▌Adam Boyd (Democratic-Republican) 3.4%
New Jersey at-large 6 seats on a general ticket	James Sloan	Democratic-Republican	1803	Incumbent re-elected.	▌ ✓ William Helms (Democratic-Republican) 14.9%; ▌ ✓ Thomas Newbold (Democratic-Republican) 12.4%; ▌ ✓ Henry Southard (Democratic-Republican) 12.4%; ▌ ✓ Ezra Darby (Democratic-Republican) 11.9%; ▌ ✓ John Lambert (Democratic-Republican) 11.8%; ▌ ✓ James Sloan (Democratic-Republican) 11.2%; ▌Aaron Ogden (Federalist) 5.9%; ▌Ebenezer Elmer (Federalist) 5.8%; ▌John Beatty (Federalist) 5.3%; ▌George C. Maxwell (Democratic-Republican) 3.8%; ▌Adam Boyd (Democratic-Republican) 3.4%

== New York ==
New York elected representatives to the 10th Congress on April 29 – May 1, 1806. This was the second and last election in which Districts 2 and 3 were elected on a joint ticket. New York redistricted in the next election.

District	Incumbent			This race	
District	Member	Party	First elected	Results	Candidates
New York 1	Eliphalet Wickes	Democratic-Republican	1804	Incumbent retired. Democratic-Republican hold.	▌ ✓ Samuel Riker (Democratic-Republican) 99.1%
New York 2/ New York 3 Joint ticket	Gurdon S. Mumford	Democratic-Republican	1804 (special)	Incumbent re-elected.	▌ ✓ Gurdon S. Mumford (Democratic-Republican) 27.8%; ▌ ✓ George Clinton Jr. (Democratic-Republican) 26.5%; ▌John B. Coles (Federalist) 22.3%; ▌Nicholas Fish (Federalist) 22.3%; ▌John R. Livingston (Democratic-Republican) 1.0%
New York 2/ New York 3 Joint ticket	George Clinton Jr.	Democratic-Republican	1805 (special)	Incumbent re-elected.	▌ ✓ Gurdon S. Mumford (Democratic-Republican) 27.8%; ▌ ✓ George Clinton Jr. (Democratic-Republican) 26.5%; ▌John B. Coles (Federalist) 22.3%; ▌Nicholas Fish (Federalist) 22.3%; ▌John R. Livingston (Democratic-Republican) 1.0%
New York 4	Philip Van Cortlandt	Democratic-Republican	1793	Incumbent re-elected.	▌ ✓ Philip Van Cortlandt (Democratic-Republican) 46.5%; ▌Peter A. Jay (Federalist) 41.0 %; ▌Peter Taulman (Democratic-Republican) 6.5%; ▌Samuel S. Smith (D-R Quid) 6.1%
New York 5	John Blake Jr.	Democratic-Republican	1804	Incumbent re-elected.	▌ ✓ John Blake Jr. (Democratic-Republican) 62.9%; ▌Reuben Hopkins (Federalist) 37.1%
New York 6	Daniel C. Verplanck	Democratic-Republican	1803 (special)	Incumbent re-elected.	▌ ✓ Daniel C. Verplanck (Democratic-Republican) 98.5%
New York 7	Martin G. Schuneman	Democratic-Republican	1804	Incumbent retired. Federalist gain.	▌ ✓ Barent Gardenier (Federalist) 47.8%; ▌William A. Thompson (Quid) 34.7%; ▌Johannes Bruyn (Democratic-Republican) 17.5%
New York 8	Henry W. Livingston	Federalist	1802	Incumbent retired. Democratic-Republican gain.	▌ ✓ James I. Van Alen (Democratic-Republican) 50.1%; ▌Robert Le Roy Livingston (Federalist) 49.9%
New York 9	Killian Van Rensselaer	Federalist	1800	Incumbent re-elected.	▌ ✓ Killian Van Rensselaer (Federalist) 46.6%; ▌Benjamin DeWitt (Democratic-Republican) 32.7%; ▌Henry Glen (D-R Quid) 20.6%
New York 10	Josiah Masters	Democratic-Republican	1804	Incumbent re-elected.	▌ ✓ Josiah Masters (Democratic-Republican) 51.1%; ▌Hosea Moffet (Federalist) 48.6%
New York 11	Peter Sailly	Democratic-Republican	1804	Incumbent lost re-election. Democratic-Republican hold.	▌ ✓ John Thompson (Democratic-Republican) 57.8%; ▌Asahel Porter (Federalist) 39.6%; ▌Peter Sailly (Democratic-Republican) 2.6%
New York 12	David Thomas	Democratic-Republican	1800	Incumbent re-elected.	▌ ✓ David Thomas (Democratic-Republican) 92.4%; Others 8.6%
New York 13	Thomas Sammons	Democratic-Republican	1802	Incumbent retired. Democratic-Republican hold.	▌ ✓ Peter Swart (Democratic-Republican) 69.4%; ▌Isaac H. Tiffany (Federalist) 30.6%
New York 14	John Russell	Democratic-Republican	1804	Incumbent re-elected.	▌ ✓ John Russell (Democratic-Republican) 67.3%; ▌Solomon Martin (Federalist) 33.7%
New York 15	Nathan Williams	Democratic-Republican	1804	Incumbent retired. D-R Quid gain.	▌ ✓ William Kirkpatrick (D-R Quid) 55.3%; ▌John Nicholson (Democratic-Republican) 44.7%
New York 16	Uri Tracy	Democratic-Republican	1804	Incumbent lost re-election. Democratic-Republican hold.	▌ ✓ Reuben Humphrey (Democratic-Republican) 86.1%; ▌Thaddeus M. Wood (Federalist) 8.1%; ▌John Cantine (Democratic-Republican) 3.1%; ▌Uri Tracy (Democratic-Republican) 2.6%
New York 17	Silas Halsey	Democratic-Republican	1804	Incumbent lost re-election. Democratic-Republican hold.	▌ ✓ John Harris (Democratic-Republican) 35.1%; ▌Daniel W. Lewis (Federalist) 33.6%; ▌Silas Halsey (D-R Quid) 30.0%; ▌James Faulkner (Democratic-Republican) 1.8%

== North Carolina ==
North Carolina elected its members August 15, 1806.

District	Incumbent			This race	
District	Member	Party	First elected	Results	Candidates
North Carolina 1	Thomas Wynns	Democratic-Republican	1802 (special)	Incumbent retired. Democratic-Republican hold.	▌ ✓ Lemuel Sawyer (Democratic-Republican) 64.0%; ▌William H. Murfree (Democratic-Republican) 36.0%
North Carolina 2	Willis Alston	Democratic-Republican	1798	Incumbent re-elected.	▌ ✓ Willis Alston (Democratic-Republican) 100%
North Carolina 3	Thomas Blount	Democratic-Republican	1793; 1804	Incumbent re-elected.	▌ ✓ Thomas Blount (Democratic-Republican) 50.1% (Note: Victory by a 6-vote margin, 2,056-2,050); ▌William Kennedy (Democratic-Republican) 49.9%
North Carolina 4	William Blackledge	Democratic-Republican	1803	Incumbent re-elected.	▌ ✓ William Blackledge (Democratic-Republican) 100%
North Carolina 5	Thomas Kenan	Democratic-Republican	1805 (special)	Incumbent re-elected.	▌ ✓ Thomas Kenan (Democratic-Republican); ▌Benjamin Smith (Democratic-Republican); ▌Samuel Jacelyn (Unknown); ▌Alexander D. Moore (Unknown)
North Carolina 6	Nathaniel Macon	Democratic-Republican	1791	Incumbent re-elected.	▌ ✓ Nathaniel Macon (Democratic-Republican) 99.8%
North Carolina 7	Duncan McFarlan	Democratic-Republican	1804	Incumbent lost re-election. Federalist gain. Election was later contested.	▌ ✓ John Culpepper (Federalist) 48.1%; ▌Duncan McFarlan (Democratic-Republican) 47.2%; ▌John Hay (Federalist) 3.7%; ▌James Sanders (Democratic-Republican) 1.0%
North Carolina 8	Richard Stanford	Democratic-Republican	1796	Incumbent re-elected.	▌ ✓ Richard Stanford (Democratic-Republican) 94.3%; ▌Calvin Jones (Unknown) 2.6%
North Carolina 9	Marmaduke Williams	Democratic-Republican	1803	Incumbent re-elected.	▌ ✓ Marmaduke Williams (Democratic-Republican) 57.9%; ▌Theophilus Lacy (Democratic-Republican) 42.1%
North Carolina 10	Evan S. Alexander	Democratic-Republican	1806 (special)	Incumbent re-elected.	▌ ✓ Evan S. Alexander; ▌Matthew Brandon (Unknown)
North Carolina 11	James Holland	Democratic-Republican	1800	Incumbent re-elected.	▌ ✓ James Holland (Democratic-Republican) 96.1%; ▌Joseph Graham (Unknown) 3.7%
North Carolina 12	Joseph Winston	Democratic-Republican	1803	Incumbent retired. Democratic-Republican hold.	▌ ✓ Meshack Franklin (Democratic-Republican) 63.1%; ▌William Lenoir (Democratic-Republican) 32.5%; ▌Peter Eaton (Democratic-Republican) 4.4%

== Ohio ==
Ohio elected its member October 14, 1806. Both candidates were Democratic-Republicans, but from election articles published in The Scioto Gazette it was suggested that James Pritchard was the candidate of the Ohio Quids and that in a few counties, notably Columbiana and Jefferson, he was also supported by the Federalists.

District	Incumbent			This race	
District	Member	Party	First elected	Results	Candidates
Ohio at-large	Jeremiah Morrow	Democratic- Republican	1803	Incumbent re-elected.	▌ ✓ Jeremiah Morrow (Democratic-Republican) 73.9%; ▌James Pritchard (D-R Quid) 26.0%

== Orleans Territory ==
See Non-voting delegates, below.

== Pennsylvania ==
Pennsylvania elected its members October 14, 1806.

District	Incumbent			This race	
District	Member	Party	First elected	Results	Candidates
Pennsylvania 1 Plural district with 3 seats	Michael Leib	Democratic-Republican	1798	Incumbent resigned February 14, 1806. Democratic-Republican hold. Winner also elected to finish the current term; see above.	▌ ✓ John Porter (Democratic-Republican) 21.1%; ▌ ✓ Jacob Richards (Democratic-Republican) 20.7%; ▌ ✓ Joseph Clay (Democratic-Republican) 20.4%; ▌William Graham (Federalist) 18.3%; ▌Joseph Hemphill (Federalist) 12.7%; ▌John Sergeant (Federalist) 6.8%
Pennsylvania 1 Plural district with 3 seats	Jacob Richards	Democratic-Republican	1802	Incumbent re-elected.	▌ ✓ John Porter (Democratic-Republican) 21.1%; ▌ ✓ Jacob Richards (Democratic-Republican) 20.7%; ▌ ✓ Joseph Clay (Democratic-Republican) 20.4%; ▌William Graham (Federalist) 18.3%; ▌Joseph Hemphill (Federalist) 12.7%; ▌John Sergeant (Federalist) 6.8%
Pennsylvania 1 Plural district with 3 seats	Joseph Clay	Democratic-Republican	1802	Incumbent re-elected.	▌ ✓ John Porter (Democratic-Republican) 21.1%; ▌ ✓ Jacob Richards (Democratic-Republican) 20.7%; ▌ ✓ Joseph Clay (Democratic-Republican) 20.4%; ▌William Graham (Federalist) 18.3%; ▌Joseph Hemphill (Federalist) 12.7%; ▌John Sergeant (Federalist) 6.8%
Pennsylvania 2 Plural district with 3 seats	Robert Brown	Democratic-Republican	1798 (special)	Incumbent re-elected.	▌ ✓ Robert Brown (Democratic-Republican) 18.0%; ▌ ✓ William Milnor (Federalist Quid) 16.8%; ▌ ✓ John Pugh (Democratic-Republican) 16.6%; ▌John Hahn (Democratic-Republican) 16.5%; ▌Frederick Conrad (D-R Quid) 16.2%; ▌William Latimore (D-R Quid) 16.0%
Pennsylvania 2 Plural district with 3 seats	Frederick Conrad	Democratic-Republican	1802	Incumbent lost re-election. Federalist Quid gain.	▌ ✓ Robert Brown (Democratic-Republican) 18.0%; ▌ ✓ William Milnor (Federalist Quid) 16.8%; ▌ ✓ John Pugh (Democratic-Republican) 16.6%; ▌John Hahn (Democratic-Republican) 16.5%; ▌Frederick Conrad (D-R Quid) 16.2%; ▌William Latimore (D-R Quid) 16.0%
Pennsylvania 2 Plural district with 3 seats	John Pugh	Democratic-Republican	1804	Incumbent re-elected.	▌ ✓ Robert Brown (Democratic-Republican) 18.0%; ▌ ✓ William Milnor (Federalist Quid) 16.8%; ▌ ✓ John Pugh (Democratic-Republican) 16.6%; ▌John Hahn (Democratic-Republican) 16.5%; ▌Frederick Conrad (D-R Quid) 16.2%; ▌William Latimore (D-R Quid) 16.0%
Pennsylvania 3 Plural district with 3 seats	Isaac Anderson	Democratic-Republican	1802	Incumbent retired. Federalist Quid gain.	▌ ✓ John Hiester (D-R Quid) 18.3%; ▌ ✓ Matthias Richards (D-R Quid) 18.1%; ▌ ✓ Robert Jenkins (Federalist Quid) 17.7%; ▌John Whitehill (Democratic-Republican) 15.5%; ▌Roger Davis (Democratic-Republican) 15.2%; ▌William Witman (Democratic-Republican) 15.1%
Pennsylvania 3 Plural district with 3 seats	Christian Lower	Democratic-Republican	1804	Incumbent retired. D-R Quid gain.	▌ ✓ John Hiester (D-R Quid) 18.3%; ▌ ✓ Matthias Richards (D-R Quid) 18.1%; ▌ ✓ Robert Jenkins (Federalist Quid) 17.7%; ▌John Whitehill (Democratic-Republican) 15.5%; ▌Roger Davis (Democratic-Republican) 15.2%; ▌William Witman (Democratic-Republican) 15.1%
Pennsylvania 3 Plural district with 3 seats	John Whitehill	Democratic-Republican	1802	Incumbent lost re-election. D-R Quid gain.	▌ ✓ John Hiester (D-R Quid) 18.3%; ▌ ✓ Matthias Richards (D-R Quid) 18.1%; ▌ ✓ Robert Jenkins (Federalist Quid) 17.7%; ▌John Whitehill (Democratic-Republican) 15.5%; ▌Roger Davis (Democratic-Republican) 15.2%; ▌William Witman (Democratic-Republican) 15.1%
Pennsylvania 4 Plural district with 2 seats	Robert Whitehill	Democratic-Republican	1805 (special)	Incumbent re-elected.	▌ ✓ Robert Whitehill (Democratic-Republican) 47.7%; ▌ ✓ David Bard (D-R Quid) 42.7%; ▌Evers Doty (Democratic-Republican) 7.8%; ▌Oliver Pollock (Unknown) 1.8%
Pennsylvania 4 Plural district with 2 seats	David Bard	Democratic-Republican	1802	Incumbent re-elected as a D-R Quid. D-R Quid gain.	▌ ✓ Robert Whitehill (Democratic-Republican) 47.7%; ▌ ✓ David Bard (D-R Quid) 42.7%; ▌Evers Doty (Democratic-Republican) 7.8%; ▌Oliver Pollock (Unknown) 1.8%
Pennsylvania 5	Andrew Gregg	Democratic-Republican	1791	Incumbent lost re-election as a D-R Quid. Democratic-Republican hold.	▌ ✓ Daniel Montgomery Jr. (Democratic-Republican) 57.7%; ▌Andrew Gregg 42.3% (D-R Quid)
Pennsylvania 6	James Kelly	Federalist	1804	Incumbent re-elected as a Federalist Quid.	▌ ✓ James Kelly (Federalist Quid) 100%
Pennsylvania 7	John Rea	Democratic-Republican	1802	Incumbent re-elected.	▌ ✓ John Rea (Democratic-Republican) 52.7%; ▌Andrew Dunlap (Federalist) 29.7%; ▌Henry Woods (D-R Quid) 17.6%
Pennsylvania 8	William Findley	Democratic-Republican	1802	Incumbent re-elected.	▌ ✓ William Findley (Democratic-Republican) 100%
Pennsylvania 9	John Smilie	Democratic-Republican	1792; 1798	Incumbent re-elected.	▌ ✓ John Smilie (Democratic-Republican) 100%
Pennsylvania 10	John Hamilton	Democratic-Republican	1804	Incumbent lost re-election as a Federalist Quid. Democratic-Republican hold.	▌ ✓ William Hoge (Democratic-Republican) 62.0%; ▌John Hamilton (Federalist Quid) 38.0%
Pennsylvania 11	Samuel Smith	Democratic-Republican	1805 (special)	Incumbent re-elected.	▌ ✓ Samuel Smith (Democratic-Republican) 55.9%; ▌John Wilkins (Federalist Quid) 44.1%

== Rhode Island ==
Rhode Island elected its members August 26, 1806. Rhode Island law required a majority of votes to win. In this election, only one candidate won a majority on the first ballot, and so a run-off election was required to choose the second seat.

District	Incumbent			This race	
District	Member	Party	First elected	Results	Candidates
Rhode Island at-large 2 seats on a general ticket	Nehemiah Knight	Democratic- Republican	1802	Incumbent re-elected.	First ballot: ▌ ✓ Nehemiah Knight (Democratic-Republican) 26.9%; ▌Isaac Wilbour (Democratic-Republican) 24.4%; ▌William Hunter (Federalist) 22.2%; ▌Thomas Arnold (Federalist) 21.8%; ▌Thomas B. Hazard (D-R Quid) 4.7%; Second ballot: ▌ ✓ Isaac Wilbour (Democratic-Republican) 58.2%; ▌William Hunter (Federalist) 41.3%
Rhode Island at-large 2 seats on a general ticket	Joseph Stanton Jr.	Democratic- Republican	1800	Incumbent retired. Democratic-Republican hold.	First ballot: ▌ ✓ Nehemiah Knight (Democratic-Republican) 26.9%; ▌Isaac Wilbour (Democratic-Republican) 24.4%; ▌William Hunter (Federalist) 22.2%; ▌Thomas Arnold (Federalist) 21.8%; ▌Thomas B. Hazard (D-R Quid) 4.7%; Second ballot: ▌ ✓ Isaac Wilbour (Democratic-Republican) 58.2%; ▌William Hunter (Federalist) 41.3%

== South Carolina ==
South Carolina elected its members October 13–14, 1806.

District	Incumbent			This race	
District	Member	Party	First elected	Results	Candidates
South Carolina 1 "Charleston district"	Robert Marion	Democratic- Republican	1804	Incumbent re-elected.	▌ ✓ Robert Marion (Democratic-Republican) 55.6%; ▌William L. Smith (Federalist) 43.6%
South Carolina 2 "Beaufort and Edgefield district"	William Butler Sr.	Democratic- Republican	1800	Incumbent re-elected.	▌ ✓ William Butler Sr. (Democratic-Republican) 73.6%; ▌Richard B. Screven (Federalist) 26.2%
South Carolina 3 "Georgetown district"	David R. Williams	Democratic- Republican	1804	Incumbent re-elected.	▌ ✓ David R. Williams (Democratic-Republican) 97.9%
South Carolina 4 "Orangeburgh district"	O'Brien Smith	Democratic- Republican	1804	Incumbent retired. Democratic-Republican hold.	▌ ✓ John Taylor (Democratic-Republican) 55.3%; ▌Henry Dana Ward (Federalist) 30.0%; ▌Miles B. Pinkney (Democratic-Republican) 14.3%
South Carolina 5 "Sumter district"	Richard Winn	Democratic- Republican	1802 (special)	Incumbent re-elected.	▌ ✓ Richard Winn (Democratic-Republican) 73.0%; ▌Anthony Butler (Federalist) 27.0%
South Carolina 6 "Abbeville district"	Levi Casey	Democratic- Republican	1803	Incumbent re-elected but died February 3, 1807, leading to a special election; see above.	▌ ✓ Levi Casey (Democratic-Republican) 50.1%; ▌John A. Elmer (Federalist) 25.2%; ▌Joseph Calhoun (Democratic-Republican) 24.7%
South Carolina 7 "Chester district"	Thomas Moore	Democratic- Republican	1800	Incumbent re-elected.	▌ ✓ Thomas Moore (Democratic-Republican); Uncontested
South Carolina 8 "Pendleton district"	Elias Earle	Democratic- Republican	1805 (special)	Incumbent lost re-election. Democratic-Republican hold.	▌ ✓ Lemuel J. Alston (Democratic-Republican) 39.7%; ▌William Hunter (Democratic-Republican) 30.3%; ▌Elias Earle (Democratic-Republican) 30.0%

== Tennessee ==
Tennessee elected its members August 3–4, 1807, after the Congress began but before the first session met.

District	Incumbent			This race	
District	Member	Party	First elected	Results	Candidates
Tennessee 1 "Washington district"	John Rhea	Democratic- Republican	1803	Incumbent re-elected.	▌ ✓ John Rhea (Democratic-Republican); Uncontested
Tennessee 2 "Hamilton district"	George W. Campbell	Democratic- Republican	1803	Incumbent re-elected.	▌ ✓ George W. Campbell (Democratic-Republican) 69.3%; ▌Pleasant M. Miller (Democratic-Republican) 30.7%
Tennessee 3 "Mero district"	William Dickson	Democratic- Republican	1801	Incumbent retired. Democratic-Republican hold.	▌ ✓ Jesse Wharton (Democratic-Republican) 62.5%; ▌James Lyon (Democratic-Republican) 31.2%; ▌Spencer Clack (Unknown) 3.5%; ▌Moses Fisk (Unknown) 2.8%

== Vermont ==
Vermont elected its members September 2, 1806.

District	Incumbent			This race	
District	Member	Party	First elected	Results	Candidates
Vermont 1 "Southwestern district"	Gideon Olin	Democratic- Republican	1802	Incumbent retired. Democratic-Republican hold.	▌ ✓ James Witherell (Democratic-Republican) 54.1%; ▌Jonas Galusha (Federalist) 29.4%; Others 16.5%
Vermont 2 "Southeastern district"	James Elliot	Federalist	1802	Incumbent re-elected.	▌ ✓ James Elliot (Federalist) 57.9%; ▌William Hunter (Democratic-Republican) 32.2%; Others 9.9%
Vermont 3 "Northeastern district"	James Fisk	Democratic- Republican	1805	Incumbent re-elected.	▌ ✓ James Fisk (Democratic-Republican) 61.0%; ▌William Chamberlain (Federalist) 37.1%; Others 1.9%
Vermont 4 "Northwestern district"	Martin Chittenden	Federalist	1802	Incumbent re-elected.	▌ ✓ Martin Chittenden (Federalist) 52.6%; ▌Ezra Butler (Democratic-Republican) 43.3%; Others 4.2%

== Virginia ==
Virginia elected its members in April 1807, after the Congress began but before the first session met.

District	Incumbent			This race	
District	Member	Party	First elected	Results	Candidates
Virginia 1	John G. Jackson	Democratic-Republican	1803	Incumbent re-elected.	▌ ✓ John G. Jackson (Democratic-Republican) 58.9%; ▌Noah Linsley (Federalist) 41.1%
Virginia 2	John Morrow	Democratic-Republican	1805	Incumbent re-elected.	▌ ✓ John Morrow (Democratic-Republican) 100%
Virginia 3	John Smith	Democratic-Republican	1801	Incumbent re-elected.	▌ ✓ John Smith (Democratic-Republican); ▌James Singleton (Unknown)
Virginia 4	David Holmes	Democratic-Republican	1797	Incumbent re-elected.	▌ ✓ David Holmes (Democratic-Republican) 100%
Virginia 5	Alexander Wilson	Democratic-Republican	1804 (special)	Incumbent re-elected.	▌ ✓ Alexander Wilson (Democratic-Republican) 57.0%; ▌Oliver Towles (Democratic-Republican) 23.4%; ▌Robert Bailey (D-R Quid) 19.3%
Virginia 6	Abram Trigg	Democratic-Republican	1797	Incumbent re-elected.	▌ ✓ Abram Trigg (Democratic-Republican); ▌Daniel Sheffey (D-R Quid)
Virginia 7	Joseph Lewis Jr.	Federalist	1803	Incumbent re-elected.	▌ ✓ Joseph Lewis Jr. (Federalist) 55.2%; ▌John Littlejohn (Democratic-Republican) 44.8%
Virginia 8	Walter Jones	Democratic-Republican	1803	Incumbent re-elected.	▌ ✓ Walter Jones (Democratic-Republican) 86.7%; ▌Richard Barnes (Federalist) 13.3%
Virginia 9	Philip R. Thompson	Democratic-Republican	1793	Incumbent lost re-election. Democratic-Republican hold.	▌ ✓ John Love (Democratic-Republican) 60.5%; ▌Philip R. Thompson (Democratic-Republican) 39.5%
Virginia 10	John Dawson	Democratic-Republican	1797	Incumbent re-elected.	▌ ✓ John Dawson (Democratic-Republican) 60.0%; ▌John Mercer (Democratic-Republican) 40.0%
Virginia 11	James M. Garnett	Democratic-Republican	1805	Incumbent re-elected.	▌ ✓ James M. Garnett (Democratic-Republican) 63.2%; ▌Larkin Smith (Democratic-Republican) 36.8%
Virginia 12	Burwell Bassett	Democratic-Republican	1805	Incumbent re-elected.	▌ ✓ Burwell Bassett (Democratic-Republican) 100%
Virginia 13	William A. Burwell	Democratic-Republican	1806 (special)	Incumbent re-elected.	▌ ✓ William A. Burwell (Democratic-Republican) 100%
Virginia 14	Matthew Clay	Democratic-Republican	1797	Incumbent re-elected.	▌ ✓ Matthew Clay (Democratic-Republican) 99.5%
Virginia 15	John Randolph	D-R Quid	1799	Incumbent re-elected.	▌ ✓ John Randolph (D-R Quid) 100%
Virginia 16	John W. Eppes	Democratic-Republican	1803	Incumbent re-elected.	▌ ✓ John W. Eppes (Democratic-Republican) 100%
Virginia 17	John Claiborne	Democratic-Republican	1805	Incumbent re-elected.	▌ ✓ John Claiborne (Democratic-Republican) 100%
Virginia 18	Peterson Goodwyn	Democratic-Republican	1803	Incumbent re-elected.	▌ ✓ Peterson Goodwyn (Democratic-Republican) 100%
Virginia 19	Edwin Gray	D-R Quid	1799	Incumbent re-elected.	▌ ✓ Edwin Gray (D-R Quid) 100%
Virginia 20	Thomas Newton Jr.	Democratic-Republican	1799	Incumbent re-elected.	▌ ✓ Thomas Newton Jr. (Democratic-Republican) 100%
Virginia 21	Thomas M. Randolph	Democratic-Republican	1803	Incumbent retired. Democratic-Republican hold.	▌ ✓ Wilson C. Nicholas (Democratic-Republican) 100%
Virginia 22	John Clopton	Democratic-Republican	1801	Incumbent re-elected.	▌ ✓ John Clopton (Democratic-Republican) 52.4%; ▌Peyton Randolph (D-R Quid) 47.8%

== Non-voting delegates ==
As in the previous congress, there were three territories with non-voting delegates in the 10th Congress. In Indiana Territory, the legislature elected the delegate. The source used did not have information about Mississippi or Orleans Territory. Mississippi used popular election in 1808, while Orleans Territory elected its delegate by the legislature in 1808, suggesting Orleans probably used legislative election this year, too.

District	Incumbent			This race	
District	Delegate	Party	First elected	Results	Candidates
Indiana Territory at-large	Benjamin Parke	Federalist	1805	Incumbent re-elected September 3, 1807.	▌ ✓ Benjamin Parke (Federalist) 8; ▌John Rice Jones (Unknown) 1; ▌Waller Taylor (Unknown) 1; ▌Shadrach Bond (Unknown) 1
Mississippi Territory at-large	William Lattimore	Democratic- Republican	1803	Unknown if incumbent retired or lost re-election. Democratic-Republican hold.	▌ ✓ George Poindexter (Democratic-Republican); [data missing]
Orleans Territory at-large (9th Congress)	New district			New seat. New delegate elected August 1, 1806 (Note: "Date of election speculative." (acc. to source)) to finish the current term.	▌ ✓ Daniel Clark (Independent)
Orleans Territory at-large (10th Congress)	Daniel Clark	Independent	1806	Incumbent re-elected September 10, 1806.	▌ ✓ Daniel Clark (Independent)

== See also ==
- 1806 United States elections
  - List of United States House of Representatives elections (1789–1822)
  - 1806–07 United States Senate elections
- 9th United States Congress
- 10th United States Congress

== Bibliography ==
- "A New Nation Votes: American Election Returns 1787-1825". Tufts Digital Library, Tufts University. Archived from the original on January 29, 2015.
- Dubin, Michael J. (March 1, 1998). United States Congressional Elections, 1788-1997: The Official Results of the Elections of the 1st Through 105th Congresses. McFarland and Company. ISBN 978-0786402830.
- Martis, Kenneth C. (January 1, 1989). The Historical Atlas of Political Parties in the United States Congress, 1789-1989. Macmillan Publishing Company. ISBN 978-0029201701.
- "Party Divisions of the House of Representatives* 1789–Present". Office of the Historian, United States House of Representatives.
- Mapping Early American Elections project team (2019). "Mapping Early American Elections". Roy Rosenzweig Center for History and New Media, George Mason University.
