= 1804 United States House of Representatives elections in Pennsylvania =

United States House of Representatives elections in Pennsylvania, 1804
- October 9, 1804

All 13 Pennsylvania seats to the United States House of Representatives
	Majority party	Minority party
Party	Democratic-Republican	Federalist
Last election	18	0
Seats won	17	1
Seat change	▼1	▲1

Elections to the United States House of Representatives were held in Pennsylvania on October 9, 1804, for the 9th Congress.

== Background ==
In the previous election, a delegation of all Democratic-Republicans had been elected to Congress. At this time, a moderate wing of the Democratic-Republican party, known as the Constitutional Republicans or tertium quids ("quids" for short) had broken off from the majority and ran candidates in several districts. The Quids were generally allied with the Federalists.

== Congressional districts ==
Pennsylvania was divided into 11 districts, of which four were plural districts with 11 Representatives between them. Several new counties were created between the 1802 elections and the 1804 elections. The districts were:

- The 1st district (3 seats) consisted of Delaware and Philadelphia counties (including the City of Philadelphia)
- The 2nd district (3 seats) consisted of Bucks, Luzerne, Montgomery, Northampton, and Wayne Counties
- The 3rd district (3 seats) consisted of Berks, Chester, and Lancaster Counties
- The 4th district (2 seats) consisted of Cumberland, Dauphin, Huntingdon, and Mifflin Counties
- The 5th district consisted of Centre, Clearfield, Lycoming, McKean, Northumberland, Potter, and Tioga Counties
- The 6th district consisted of Adams and York Counties
- The 7th district consisted of Bedford and Franklin Counties
- The 8th district consisted of Armstrong, Cambria, Indiana, Jefferson, Somerset, and Westmoreland Counties
- The 9th district consisted of Fayette and Greene Counties
- The 10th district consisted of Washington County
- The 11th district consisted of Allegheny, Beaver, Butler, Crawford, Erie, Mercer, Venango, and Warren Counties

The borders between the 4th, 5th, and 8th districts were altered slightly in the erection of new counties from parts of several counties

Note: Many of these counties covered much larger areas than they do today, having since been divided into smaller counties

== Election results ==
Fifteen incumbents ran for re-election, of whom 14 won. The incumbents Isaac Van Horne (DR) of the 2nd district, Joseph Hiester (DR) of the 3rd district and William Hoge (DR) of the 10th district did not run for re-election. One seat changed from Democratic-Republican to Federalist.

Returns are incomplete for the 8th, 9th, and 10th districts

1804 United States House election results
District	Democratic-Republican			Quid			Federalist		
1st 3 seats	Joseph Clay (I)	7,427	33.6%						
1st 3 seats	Jacob Richards (I)	7,021	31.7%						
1st 3 seats	Michael Leib (I)	3,992	18.0%						
1st 3 seats	William Penrose	3,685	16.7%						
2nd 3 seats	John Pugh	6,701	32.2%	John Ross	2,710	13.0%			
2nd 3 seats	Frederick Conrad (I)	6,596	21.8%	Samuel Preston	268	1.3%			
2nd 3 seats	Robert Brown (I)	4,532	21.8%						
3rd 3 seats	Christian Lower	9,079	33.1%				Thomas Boude	2,929	10.7%
3rd 3 seats	John Whitehill (I)	6,309	23.0%				Isaac Wayne	2,814	10.3%
3rd 3 seats	Isaac Anderson (I)	6,287	22.9%						
4th 2 seats	David Bard (I)	3,245	34.6%						
4th 2 seats	John A. Hanna (I)	2,931	31.2%						
4th 2 seats	Oliver Pollock	1,700	18.1%						
4th 2 seats	Robert Mitchell	1,514	16.1%						
5th	Andrew Gregg (I)	3,318	100%						
6th	John Stewart (I)	1,211	41.5%				James Kelly	1,705	58.5%
7th	John Rea (I)	1,494	100%						
8th	William Findley (I)	1,332	64.7%				John Brandon	727	35.3%
9th	John Smilie (I)		100%						
10th	John Hamilton	1,068					John Israel	No returns	
11th	John Lucas (I)	2,526	64.8%				James O'Hara	1,373	35.2%

== Special elections ==
=== Special election to the 8th Congress ===
William Hoge (DR) of the 10th district resigned October 15, 1804. A special election was held November 2, 1804 to fill his seat for the remainder of the 8th Congress

1804 Special election results
District	Democratic-Republican			Federalist
10th	John Hoge	477	52.1%	
10th	Aaron Lyle	439	47.9%	

John Hoge was William's brother.

=== Special elections to the 9th Congress ===
Two special elections were held on October 8, 1805. In the 4th district, John A. Hanna (DR) died on July 23, 1805, while in the 11th district, John Lucas (DR) resigned prior to the first meeting of the 9th Congress.

1805 Special election results
District	Democratic-Republican			Constitutional Republicans (Quid)			Federalist		
4th	Robert Whitehill	6,457	70.7%						
4th	James Duncan	2,674	29.3%						
11th	Samuel Smith	3,275	52.7%	Nathaniel Irish	681	11.0%	James O'Hara	2,263	36.4%

Michael Leib (DR) of the 1st district resigned February 14, 1806. A special election was held November 27, 1806

1806 Special election results
District	Democratic-Republican			Federalist		
1st	John Porter	2,396	73.1%	Richard Falwell	829	25.3%
1st				Jonas Preston	53	1.6%
