= 1804 Pennsylvania's 10th congressional district special election =

A special election was held in Pennsylvania's 10th congressional district on November 2, 1804, to fill a vacancy left by the resignation of William Hoge (DR) on October 15, 1804.

== Election results ==
Candidate	Party	Votes	Percent
John Hoge	Democratic-Republican	477	52.1%
Aaron Lyle	Democratic-Republican	439	47.9%

John Hoge, the winner of this special election, was the brother of the outgoing incumbent William Hoge, and took his seat November 27, 1804

== See also ==
- List of special elections to the United States House of Representatives
