= 1802 United States House of Representatives elections in Pennsylvania =

United States House of Representatives elections in Pennsylvania, 1802
- October 12, 1802

All 18 Pennsylvania seats to the United States House of Representatives
	Majority party	Minority party
Party	Democratic-Republican	Federalist
Last election	10	3
Seats won	18	0
Seat change	▲8	▼3

Elections to the United States House of Representatives were held in Pennsylvania on October 12, 1802, for the 8th Congress.

== Background ==
In the previous election, 13 Representatives (10 Democratic-Republicans and 3 Federalists) had been elected to the 7th Congress. Two (both Democratic-Republicans) had resigned and were replaced in special elections by others of the same party.

== Congressional districts ==
Pennsylvania gained 5 seats in reapportionment following the 1800 census. In redistricting, the number of districts was reduced from 12 to 11, of which four were plural districts with 11 Representatives between them. Most of the new districts had borders that were very different from the previous districts. The new districts were as follows:

- The 1st district (3 seats) consisted of Delaware and Philadelphia counties (including the City of Philadelphia)
- The 2nd district (3 seats) consisted of Bucks, Luzerne, Montgomery, Northampton, and Wayne Counties
- The 3rd district (3 seats) consisted of Berks, Chester, and Lancaster Counties
- The 4th district (2 seats) consisted of Cumberland, Dauphin, Huntingdon, and Mifflin Counties
- The 5th district consisted of Centre, Lycoming, and Northumberland Counties
- The 6th district consisted of Adams and York Counties
- The 7th district consisted of Bedford and Franklin Counties
- The 8th district consisted of Armstrong, Somerset, and Westmoreland Counties
- The 9th district consisted of Fayette and Greene Counties
- The 10th district consisted of Washington County
- The 11th district consisted of Allegheny, Beaver, Butler, Crawford, Erie, Mercer, Venango, and Warren Counties

Numerous counties had been created between 1800 and 1802 split off from other counties, and several were still administratively attached to other counties.

Note: Many of these counties covered much larger areas than they do today, having since been divided into smaller counties

== Election results ==
Twelve incumbents (9 Democratic-Republicans and 3 Federalists) ran for re-election, many in new districts. William Jones (DR) of the 1st district did not run for re-election. Of those who ran for re-election, all 9 Democratic-Republicans were re-elected, and all 3 Federalists lost to Democratic-Republicans. The six open seats were all won by Democratic-Republicans, returning an all-Democratic-Republican delegation to the 8th Congress.

1802 United States House election results
District	Democratic-Republican			Federalist		
1st 3 seats	Joseph Clay	4,363	20.2%	George Latimer	2,895	13.4%
1st 3 seats	Jacob Richards	4,316	20.0%	Peter Brown	2,875	13.3%
1st 3 seats	Michael Leib (I)	3,980	18.4%	Jonas Preston	2,847	13.2%
1st 3 seats				Elisha Gordon	304	1.4%
2nd 3 seats	Robert Brown (I)	11,456	33.0%	Samuel Sitgreaves	3,939	11.3%
2nd 3 seats	Isaac Van Horne (I)	10,697	30.8%	Nathaniel Borleau	1,682	4.8%
2nd 3 seats	Frederick Conrad	6,205	17.9%	Lord Butler	781	2.2%
3rd 3 seats	John Whitehill	9,396	22.1%	Jacob Bower	4,932	11.6%
3rd 3 seats	Isaac Anderson	9,365	22.0%	Joseph Hemphill (I)	4,853	11.4%
3rd 3 seats	Joseph Hiester (I)	9,236	21.7%	Thomas Boude (I)	4,829	11.3%
4th 2 seats	John A. Hanna (I)	6,110	50.5%			
4th 2 seats	David Bard	5,970	49.3%			
4th 2 seats	David Mitchell	28	0.2%			
5th	Andrew Gregg (I)	4,258	100%			
6th	John Stewart (I)	2,285	56.7%	John Edie	1,748	43.3%
7th	John Rea	2,173	66.6%	Henry Woods (I)	941	28.9%
7th	John McLene	147	4.5%			
8th	William Findley	1,531	53.9%			
8th	Jacob Painter	1,312	46.1%			
9th	John Smilie (I)	2,718	100%			
10th	William Hoge (I)	2,300	100%			
11th	John Lucas	2,168	48.9%	John Wilkins	1,624	36.7%
11th				Alexander Foster	638	14.4%

== Special election ==
William Hoge (DR) of the 10th district resigned October 15, 1804. A special election was held November 2, 1804 to fill the resulting vacancy

1804 Special election results
District	Democratic-Republican			Federalist
10th	John Hoge	477	52.1%	
10th	Aaron Lyle	439	47.9%	

John Hoge was William's brother.
