= 1807 South Carolina's 6th congressional district special election =

A special election was held in South Carolina's 6th congressional district June 1–2, 1807 to fill a vacancy left by the death of Levi Casey (DR) on February 3, 1807.

Casey had been elected for a third term to the 10th United States Congress in the 1806 elections. His death left a vacancy for the remainder of the 9th Congress, which remained unfilled, as well as for the 10th Congress.

== Election results ==
Candidate	Party	Votes	Percent
Joseph Calhoun	Democratic-Republican	1,088	51.0%
William Burnsides		439	20.6%
Ferdinand Nance		355	16.6%
John A. Elmore	Federalist	253	11.9%

Calhoun took his seat October 26, 1807, at the start of the 1st session of the 10th Congress.

== See also ==
- List of special elections to the United States House of Representatives
