= Ebenezer Covered Bridge =

- U.S. National Register of Historic Places
- Washington County History & Landmarks Foundation Landmark
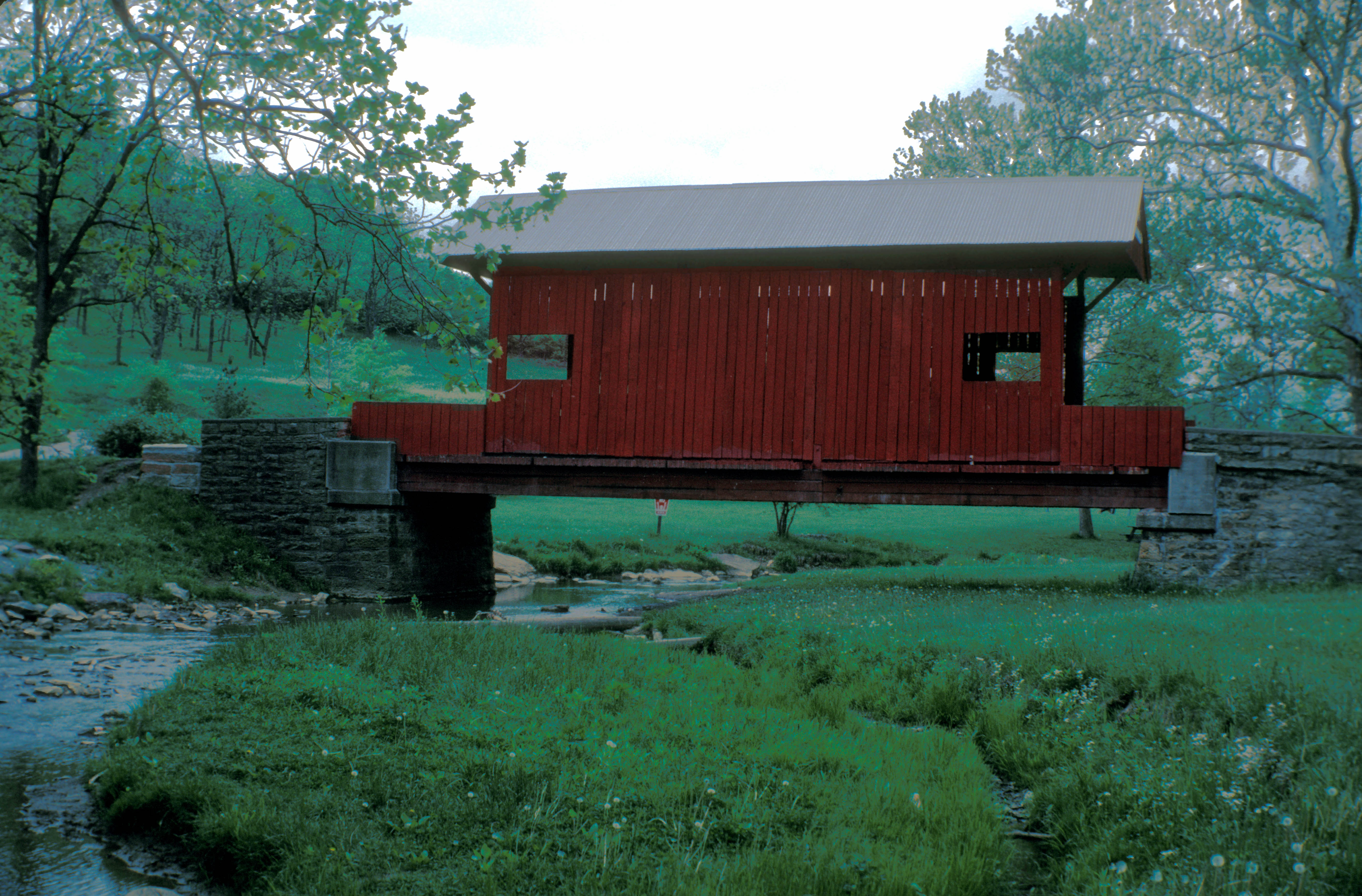

- Location within Pennsylvania Location within the United States
- Nearest city: Ginger Hill, Pennsylvania
- Coordinates: 40°11′28″N 80°2′28″W
- Area: 0.1 acres (0.040 ha)
- Architectural style: Queenpost truss
- MPS: Covered Bridges of Washington and Greene Counties TR
- NRHP reference No.: 79003829
- Added to NRHP: June 22, 1979

The Ebenezer Covered Bridge is a historic covered bridge in Eighty Four, Pennsylvania. The year the bridge was built is unknown. It was moved to its current location in 1977. The bridge is located in Mingo Creek County Park.

It is designated as a historic bridge by the Washington County History & Landmarks Foundation.
