= Isaac Smith (Pennsylvania politician) =

American politician

Isaac Smith (January 4, 1761 – April 4, 1834) was a United States representative from Pennsylvania.

== Biography ==
Irwin was born in Chester County, Pennsylvania. He engaged in agricultural pursuits near Level Corners, Pennsylvania. He was a member of the Pennsylvania House of Representatives from 1806 to 1808.

Smith was elected as a Republican to the Thirteenth Congress. He resumed agricultural pursuits and also engaged in the occupation of millwright. He died on his farm at Level Corners, near Jersey Shore, Pennsylvania, in 1834. Interment in the Pine Creek Presbyterian Churchyard, reinterment in Jersey Shore Cemetery, Jersey Shore, Lycoming County, Pennsylvania.

== Sources ==
- United States Congress. "Isaac Smith (id: S000556)". Biographical Directory of the United States Congress.
- The Political Graveyard

U.S. House of Representatives
Preceded by Aaron Lyle	Member of the U.S. House of Representatives from Pennsylvania's 10th congressional district 1813–1815 alongside: Jared Irwin	Succeeded by Jared Irwin; William Wilson
