= David Scott (Pennsylvania politician) =

American politician

Member of the United States House of Representatives
- In office 1816-1817

Personal details
- Party: Democratic-Republican

David Scott was an American politician who was elected in 1816 as a Democratic-Republican member of the United States House of Representatives to represent Pennsylvania's 10th congressional district.

Scott resigned from the Fifteenth Congress before it assembled on December 1, 1817, having been appointed president and judge of the court of common pleas.

== Sources ==
- The Political Graveyard

U.S. House of Representatives
Preceded by Jared Irwin; William Wilson	Member of the U.S. House of Representatives from Pennsylvania's 10th congressional district 1817 alongside:William Wilson	Succeeded by John Murray; William Wilson
