= William Wilson (Pennsylvania politician) =

American politician

Member of the U.S. House of Representatives from Pennsylvania's 10th district
- In office March 4, 1815 – March 3, 1819 Serving with Jared Irwin (1815–1817); David Scott (1817); John Murray (1817–1819)
- Preceded by: Isaac Smith; Jared Irwin
- Succeeded by: George Denison; John Murray

Personal details
- Party: Republican
- Occupation: Politician

William Wilson (c1777-1859) was an American politician who served in the United States House of Representatives from 1815 to 1819, representing the 10th congressional district of Pennsylvania as a Republican in the 14th United States Congress and the 15th United States Congress.

Wilson's time in office began on March 4, 1815, and concluded on March 3, 1819. He missed 16 of the 219 roll call votes taken between December 1815 and March 1819.

A land surveyor by profession, Wilson married Henrietta Graham Van Horn, the widow of U.S. representative Espy Van Horn, in about 1839. Wilson died in Sunbury, Pennsylvania, on April 2, 1859.

U.S. House of Representatives
| Preceded by Isaac Smith; Jared Irwin | Member of the U.S. House of Representatives from Pennsylvania's 10th congressional district 1815–1819; Served alongside: Jared Irwin (1815–1817); David Scott (1817); John Murray (1817–1819) | Succeeded by George Denison; John Murray |
