= Hogestown, Pennsylvania =

Unincorporated community in Pennsylvania, US

- Unincorporated community
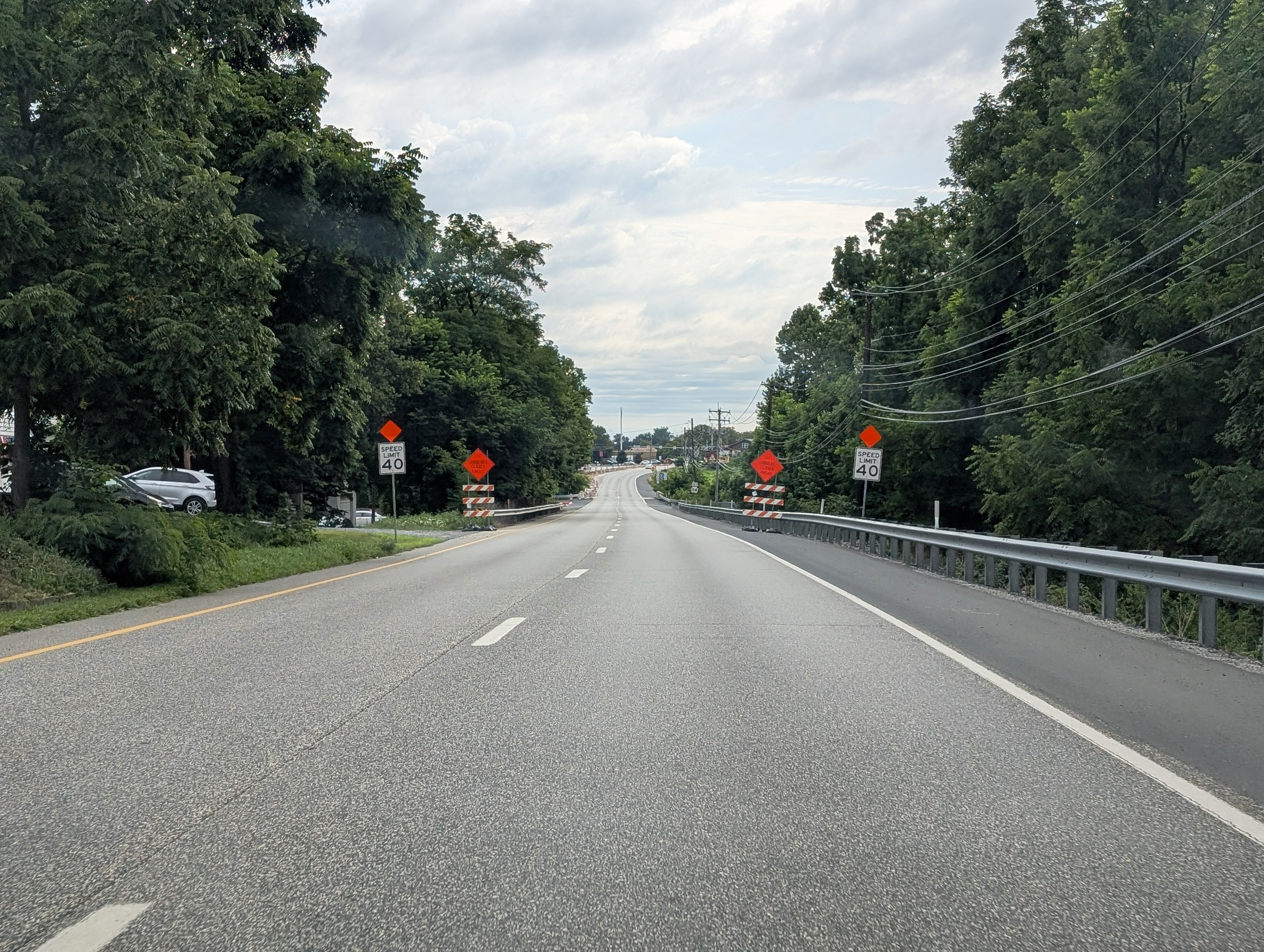
- US 11 northbound through Hogestown

- Location within Pennsylvania Location within the United States
- Coordinates: 40°14′45″N 77°01′58″W
- Country: United States
- State: Pennsylvania
- County: Cumberland
- Elevation: 387 ft (118 m)
- Time zone: UTC-5 (Eastern (EST))
  - Summer (DST): UTC-4 (EDT)
- Area codes: 717 & 223
- GNIS feature ID: 1177180

Hogestown is an unincorporated community in Cumberland County, Pennsylvania, United States.

== History ==
John Hoge and his brother William Hoge were born near Hogestown; they served in the United States House of Representatives.
