= Jared Irwin (Pennsylvania politician) =

American politician

Member of the U.S. House of Representatives from Pennsylvania's 10th district
- In office March 4, 1813 – March 3, 1817
- Preceded by: Aaron Lyle
- Succeeded by: David Scott; William Wilson

Member of the Pennsylvania House of Representatives
- In office 1811

Personal details
- Born: January 19, 1768 Province of Georgia, British America
- Died: September 20, 1818 (aged 50) Fernandina, Spanish Florida
- Party: Democratic-Republican

Jared Irwin (January 19, 1768 – September 20, 1818) was a United States representative from Pennsylvania.

== Biography ==
Irwin was born in the Province of Georgia of British America. He was appointed commissioner for valuation of lands and dwellings and enumeration of slaves for the second division of Georgia on July 17, 1798. He engaged in mercantile pursuits at Milton, Pennsylvania, and served as postmaster of Milton from June 1, 1802, to June 29, 1803. He was sheriff of Northumberland County, Pennsylvania, from 1808 to 1812. He was a member of the Pennsylvania House of Representatives in 1811, and served as colonel of the Fifth Rifle Regiment in the War of 1812.

Irwin was elected as a Republican to the Thirteenth and Fourteenth Congresses. In 1817, Irwin assisted in the establishment and became a military leader of a short-lived revolutionary government, called the Republic of the Floridas, on Amelia Island. He died in Fernandina, Florida in 1818, which was then a part of the Spanish-controlled territory of Florida (Spain ceded Florida to the U.S. in 1821 as a result of the Adams–Onís Treaty).

U.S. House of Representatives
Preceded by Aaron Lyle	Member of the U.S. House of Representatives from Pennsylvania's 10th congressional district 1813–1817 1813–1815 alongside: Isaac Smith; 1815–1817 alongside: William Wilson	Succeeded by David Scott; William Wilson
