= Pennsylvania's 10th congressional district =

U.S. House district for Pennsylvania

Coordinates: 41°22′22″N 76°31′24″W

- Interactive map of district boundaries since January 3, 2023
- Representative: Scott Perry; R–Dillsburg
- Population (2025): 796,254
- Median household income: $89,274
- Ethnicity: 71.2% White; 10.1% Black; 9.5% Hispanic; 4.5% Asian; 4.0% Two or more races; 0.6% other
- Cook PVI: R+3

Pennsylvania's 10th congressional district is currently located in the south-central region of the state. It encompasses all of Dauphin County as well as parts of Cumberland County and York County. The district includes the cities of Harrisburg and York.

== Recent election results from statewide races ==
Year	Office	Results
2008	President	McCain 50% – 48%
2008	Attorney General	Corbett 66% – 34%
2008	Auditor General	Wagner 51% – 49%
2010	Senate	Toomey 62% – 38%
2010	Governor	Corbett 66% – 34%
2012	President	Romney 54% – 46%
2012	Senate	Smith 52% – 48%
2014	Governor	Corbett 53% – 47%
2016	President	Trump 53% – 43%
2016	Senate	Toomey 55% – 42%
2016	Attorney General	Rafferty Jr. 56% – 44%
2016	Auditor General	DePasquale 47.8% – 47.7%
2016	Treasurer	Voit III 51% – 43%
2018	Senate	Casey Jr. 49.3% – 48.7%
2018	Governor	Wolf 54% – 44%
2020	President	Trump 51% – 47%
2020	Attorney General	Heidelbaugh 50% – 47%
2020	Auditor General	DeFoor 54% – 42%
2020	Treasurer	Garrity 52% – 44%
2022	Senate	Oz 49% – 48%
2022	Governor	Shapiro 55% – 43%
2024	President	Trump 52% – 47%
2024	Senate	McCormick 50% – 46%
2024	Attorney General	Sunday 53% – 44%
2024	Auditor General	DeFoor 55% – 42%
2024	Treasurer	Garrity 55% – 42%

== Demographics ==
According to the APM Research Lab's Voter Profile Tools (featuring the U.S. Census Bureau's 2019 American Community Survey), the district contained about 559,000 potential voters (citizens, age 18+). Of these, 80% are White, 10% Black, and 6% Latino. Immigrants make up 5% of the district's potential voters. Median income among households (with one or more potential voter) in the district is about $67,300, while 9% of households live below the poverty line. As for the educational attainment of potential voters in the district, 9% of those 25 and older have not earned a high school diploma, while 30% hold a bachelor's or higher degree.

== History ==
Prior to 2019, the district was located in the northeastern part of the state. The Supreme Court of Pennsylvania redrew the district in 2018 after ruling the previous map unconstitutional because of gerrymandering. The court added State College to the old district's boundaries while removing some Democratic-leaning areas and redesignated it the twelfth district; an area encompassing Harrisburg and York was numbered as the 10th. The new 10th district is represented by Republican Scott Perry, who previously represented the old fourth district.

The district was one of the 12 original districts created prior to the 4th Congress. In 2006, when it was still located in northeastern Pennsylvania, the 10th district experienced one of the greatest party shifts among all House seats that switched party control: in 2004, Republican Don Sherwood won with an 86% margin of victory over his nearest opponent and two years later, Democrat Chris Carney unseated Sherwood by a 53%–47% margin. In 2008, Carney won reelection by 12 points but the district swung back in 2010, electing Republican Tom Marino. The district was mostly Republican in its political composition, an aspect of the district that was reflected especially well in presidential elections. In 2004, President George W. Bush won 60 percent of the vote in the district and in 2008, Senator John McCain beat Senator Barack Obama here by a margin of 54 percent to 45 percent. Nonetheless, Carney easily won reelection as a Democrat the same year McCain won the district. However, in the 2010 midterm elections, Marino unseated Carney by a 55%–45% margin. In 2016, local businessman and former mayor of Lewisburg, Mike Molesevich challenged Marino for the seat, but he fell to the Republican in November by more than two to one. In 2018, Marino won election to a redrawn 12th district; while he remained the congressman for the 10th district into January 2019, he moved within the new district's boundaries beforehand.

=== District boundaries 2003–2013 ===
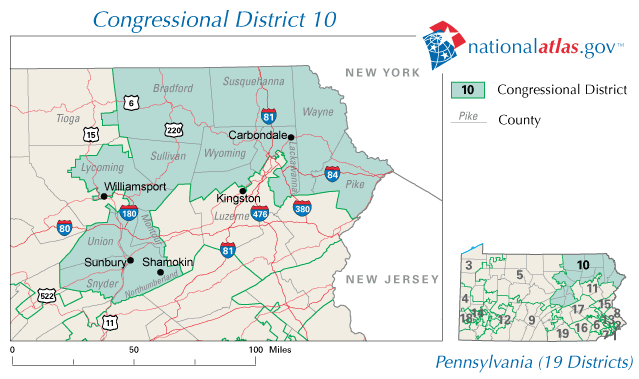
2003–2013

The Pennsylvania 10th was the third-largest congressional district in the state. The district encompassed the following counties and areas:

- Bradford County
- Lackawanna County
  - excluding Old Forge, Moosic, Scranton, and Dunmore but including Clarks Summit
- Luzerne County
  - Back Mountain area, including Dallas, Shavertown, Trucksville, Kingston, Wyoming, and Swoyersville
- Lycoming County
  - Sullivan/Columbia/Montour County boundaries west to the West Branch of the Susquehanna River (except Montoursville), north to Cogan House
- Montour County
- Northumberland County
- Pike County
- Snyder County
- Sullivan County
- Susquehanna County
- Tioga County
  - Ward Township
- Union County
- Wayne County
- Wyoming County

=== District boundaries 2013–2019 ===
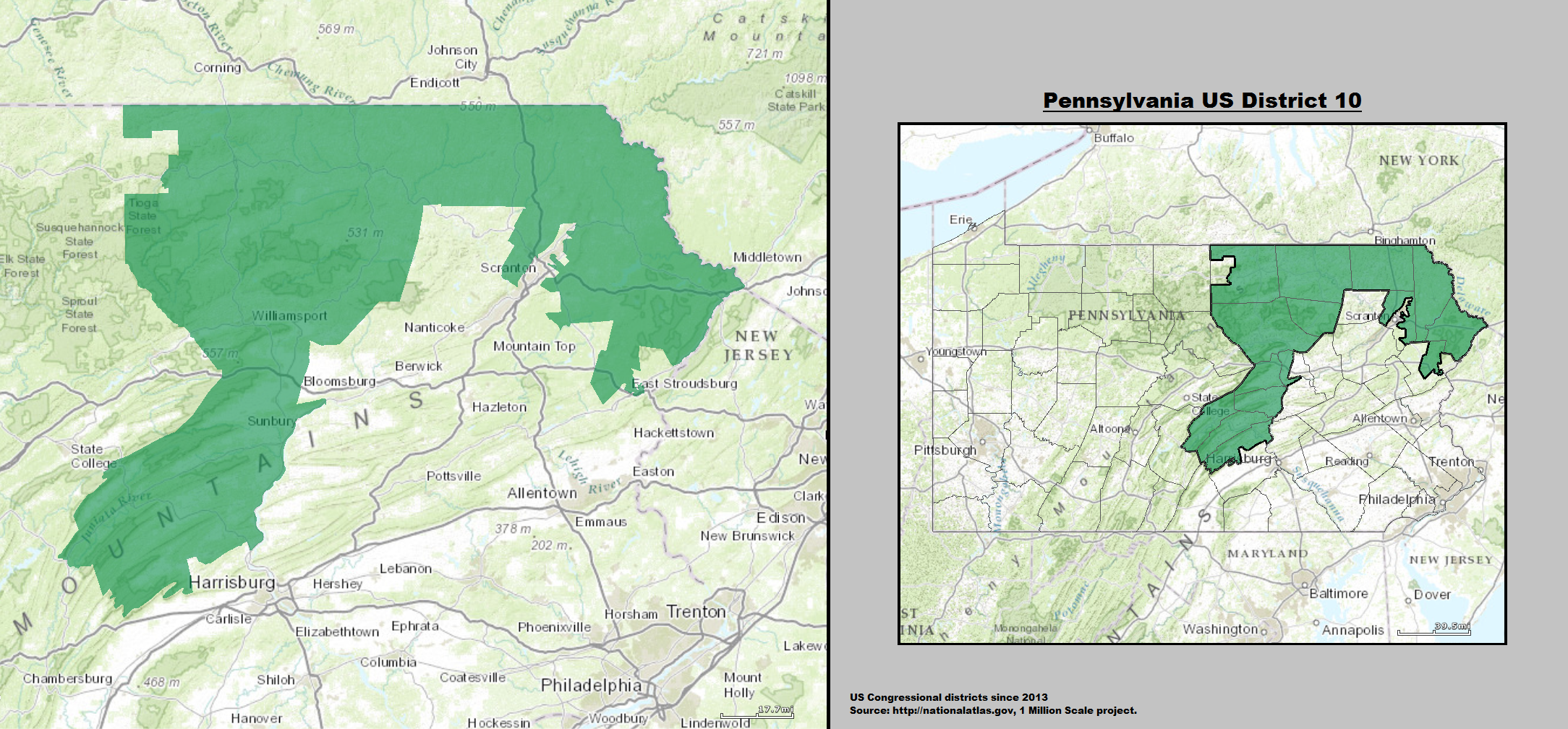
2013–2019

On June 8, 2012, The Pennsylvania Legislative Reapportionment Commission adopted a revised final redistricting plan. On May 8, 2013, The state Supreme Court unanimously approved the Legislative Reapportionment Commission's 2012 Revised Final Plan. The resulting district encompassed the following areas:

- Bradford County
- Juniata County
- Parts of Lackawanna County
  - Including: Abington Township, Benton Township, Ransom, Newton, South Abington, Clarks Summit, Clarks Green, Glenburn, West Abington, Dalton, La Plume, North Abington, Scott, Greenfield, Fell, Vandling, Jefferson, Olyphant, Madison, Covington, Clifton, Moscow, Elmhurst, Roaring Brook, parts of Carbondale, and parts of Archbald.
- Lycoming County
- Mifflin County
- Parts of Monroe County
  - Including: Barrett, East Stroudsburg, Jackson, Mount Pocono, Paradise, Pocono, Price, Stroudsburg, and parts of Stroud.
- Parts of Northumberland County
  - Including: Delaware, East Chillisquaque, West Chillisquaque, Watsontown, Lewis, Turbotville, Turbot, Milton, Point, Northumberland
- Parts of Perry County
  - Including: Toboyne, Jackson, Blain, Northeast Madison, Southwest Madison, Landisburg, Tyrone, Saville, Centre, New Bloomfield, Tuscarora, Juniata, Greenwood, Millerstown, Oliver, Newport, Miller, Howe, Liverpool Township, Liverpool, Buffalo, Watts, and New Buffalo.
- Pike County
- Snyder County
- Sullivan County
- Susquehanna County
- Majority of Tioga County
  - With the exception of Clymer Township, Chatham Township, Gaines Township, and the majority of Shippen Township
- Union County
- Wayne County

== Current counties and municipalities ==
Cumberland County (25)
Camp Hill, Carlisle, Cooke Township, Dickinson Township, East Pennsboro Township, Hampden Township, Lemoyne, Lower Allen Township, Lower Frankford Township, Mechanicsburg, Middlesex Township, Monroe Township, Mount Holly Springs, New Cumberland, Newville, North Middleton Township, North Newton Township (part; also 13th), Penn Township, Shiremanstown, Silver Spring Township, South Middleton Township, South Newton Township, Upper Allen Township, West Pennsboro Township, Wormleysburg

Dauphin County (40)

All 40 municipalities

York County (26)
Carroll Township, Conewago Township, Dillsburg, Dover Borough, Dover Township, East Manchester Township, Fairview Township, Franklin Township, Franklintown, Goldsboro, Jackson Township (part; also 11th), Lewisberry, Manchester, Manchester Township, Monaghan Township, Mount Wolf, Newberry Township, North York, Spring Garden Township, Springettsbury Township, Warrington Township, Washington Township, West Manchester Township, West York, York, York Haven

== List of members representing the district ==
District created in 1795.

=== 1795–1813: one seat ===
Representative	Party	Years	Congress	Electoral history
			District established March 4, 1795	
David Bard (Frankstown)	Democratic-Republican	March 4, 1795 – March 3, 1799	4th 5th	Elected in 1794. Re-elected in 1796. Lost re-election.
Henry Woods (Bedford)	Federalist	March 4, 1799 – March 3, 1803	6th 7th	Elected in 1798. Re-elected in 1800. Redistricted to the 7th district and lost re-election.
William Hoge (Washington)	Democratic-Republican	March 4, 1803 – October 15, 1804	8th	Redistricted from the 12th district and re-elected in 1802. Resigned.
	Vacant	October 15, 1804 – November 27, 1804	8th	
John Hoge (Washington)	Democratic-Republican	November 27, 1804 – March 3, 1805	8th	Elected November 2, 1804 to finish his brother's term and seated November 27, 1804. Retired.
John Hamilton (Washington)	Democratic-Republican	March 4, 1805 – March 3, 1807	9th	Elected in 1804. Lost re-election.
William Hoge (Washington)	Democratic-Republican	March 4, 1807 – March 3, 1809	10th	Elected in 1806. Retired.
Aaron Lyle (West Middletown)	Democratic-Republican	March 4, 1809 – March 3, 1813	11th 12th	Elected in 1808. Re-elected in 1810. Redistricted to the 12th district.

=== 1813–1823: two seats ===
Cong ress	Years	Seat A			Seat B		
Cong ress	Years	Representative	Party	Electoral history	Representative	Party	Electoral history
13th	March 4, 1813 – March 3, 1815	Isaac Smith (Waynesburg)	Democratic-Republican	Elected in 1812. Lost re-election.	Jared Irwin (Sunbury)	Democratic-Republican	Elected in 1812. Retired.
14th	March 4, 1815 – March 3, 1817	William Wilson (Williamsport)	Democratic-Republican	Elected in 1814. Re-elected in 1816. Retired.	Jared Irwin (Sunbury)	Democratic-Republican	Elected in 1812. Retired.
15th	March 4, 1817 – ?, 1817	William Wilson (Williamsport)	Democratic-Republican	Elected in 1814. Re-elected in 1816. Retired.	David Scott	Democratic-Republican	Elected in 1816. Resigned.
15th	?, 1817 – October 14, 1817	William Wilson (Williamsport)	Democratic-Republican	Elected in 1814. Re-elected in 1816. Retired.	Vacant		
15th	October 14, 1817 – March 3, 1819	William Wilson (Williamsport)	Democratic-Republican	Elected in 1814. Re-elected in 1816. Retired.	John Murray (Milton)	Democratic-Republican	Elected to finish Scott's term. Re-elected in 1818. Retired.
16th	March 4, 1819 – March 3, 1821	George Denison (Wilkes-Barre)	Democratic-Republican	Elected in 1818. Re-elected in 1820. Retired.	John Murray (Milton)	Democratic-Republican	Elected to finish Scott's term. Re-elected in 1818. Retired.
17th	March 4, 1821 – ?, 1821	George Denison (Wilkes-Barre)	Democratic-Republican	Elected in 1818. Re-elected in 1820. Retired.	William Cox Ellis (Muncy)	Democratic-Republican	Elected in 1820. Resigned and lost re-election.
17th	?, 1821 – October 9, 1821	George Denison (Wilkes-Barre)	Democratic-Republican	Elected in 1818. Re-elected in 1820. Retired.	Vacant		
17th	October 9, 1821 – March 3, 1823	George Denison (Wilkes-Barre)	Democratic-Republican	Elected in 1818. Re-elected in 1820. Retired.	Thomas Murray Jr. (Milton)	Democratic-Republican	Elected to finish Ellis's term. Retired.

=== 1823–present: one seat ===
Member	Party	Years	Cong ress	Electoral history	Location
James S. Mitchell (Rossville)	Democratic-Republican	March 4, 1823 – March 3, 1825	18th 19th	Redistricted from the 4th district and re-elected in 1822. Re-elected in 1824. Retired.	1823–1833
James S. Mitchell (Rossville)	Jacksonian	March 4, 1825 – March 3, 1827	18th 19th	Redistricted from the 4th district and re-elected in 1822. Re-elected in 1824. Retired.	1823–1833
Adam King (York)	Jacksonian	March 4, 1827 – March 3, 1833	20th 21st 22nd	Elected in 1826. Re-elected in 1828. Re-elected in 1830. Lost re-election.	1823–1833
William Clark (Dauphin)	Anti-Masonic	March 4, 1833 – March 3, 1837	23rd 24th	Elected in 1832. Re-elected in 1834. Retired.	1833–1843
Luther Reily (Harrisburg)	Democratic	March 4, 1837 – March 3, 1839	25th	Elected in 1836. Retired.	1833–1843
William Simonton (Hummelstown)	Whig	March 4, 1839 – March 3, 1843	26th 27th	Elected in 1838. Re-elected in 1840. [data missing]	1833–1843
Richard Brodhead (Easton)	Democratic	March 4, 1843 – March 3, 1849	28th 29th 30th	Elected in 1843. Re-elected in 1844. Re-elected in 1846. Retired.	1843–1853
Milo M. Dimmick (Stroudsburg)	Democratic	March 4, 1849 – March 3, 1853	31st 32nd	Elected in 1848. Re-elected in 1850. Retired.	1843–1853
Ner Middleswarth (Beavertown)	Whig	March 4, 1853 – March 3, 1855	33rd	Elected in 1852. Retired.	1853–1863
John C. Kunkel (Harrisburg)	Opposition	March 4, 1855 – March 3, 1857	34th 35th	Elected in 1854. Re-elected in 1856. Retired.	1853–1863
John C. Kunkel (Harrisburg)	Republican	March 4, 1857 – March 3, 1859	34th 35th	Elected in 1854. Re-elected in 1856. Retired.	1853–1863
John W. Killinger (Lebanon)	Republican	March 4, 1859 – March 3, 1863	36th 37th	Elected in 1858. Re-elected in 1860. Retired.	1853–1863
Myer Strouse (Pottsville)	Democratic	March 4, 1863 – March 3, 1867	38th 39th	Elected in 1862. Re-elected in 1864. Retired.	1863–1873
Henry L. Cake (Tamaqua)	Republican	March 4, 1867 – March 3, 1871	40th 41st	Elected in 1866. Re-elected in 1868. Lost renomination.	1863–1873
John W. Killinger (Lebanon)	Republican	March 4, 1871 – March 3, 1875	42nd 43rd	Elected in 1870. Re-elected in 1872. Retired.	1863–1873
John W. Killinger (Lebanon)	Republican	March 4, 1871 – March 3, 1875	42nd 43rd	Elected in 1870. Re-elected in 1872. Retired.	1873–1883
William Mutchler (Easton)	Democratic	March 4, 1875 – March 3, 1877	44th	Elected in 1874. Retired.	1873–1883
Samuel A. Bridges (Allentown)	Democratic	March 4, 1877 – March 3, 1879	45th	Elected in 1876. Retired.	1873–1883
Reuben K. Bachman (Durham)	Democratic	March 4, 1879 – March 3, 1881	46th	Elected in 1878. Retired.	1873–1883
William Mutchler (Easton)	Democratic	March 4, 1881 – March 3, 1885	47th 48th	Elected in 1880. Re-elected in 1882. Retired.	1873–1883
William Mutchler (Easton)	Democratic	March 4, 1881 – March 3, 1885	47th 48th	Elected in 1880. Re-elected in 1882. Retired.	1883–1889
William H. Sowden (Allentown)	Democratic	March 4, 1885 – March 3, 1889	49th 50th	Elected in 1884. Re-elected in 1886. Retired.	1883–1889
Marriott Brosius (Lancaster)	Republican	March 4, 1889 – March 16, 1901	51st 52nd 53rd 54th 55th 56th 57th	Elected in 1888. Re-elected in 1890. Re-elected in 1892. Re-elected in 1894. Re-elected in 1896. Re-elected in 1898. Re-elected in 1900. Died.	1889–1893
Marriott Brosius (Lancaster)	Republican	March 4, 1889 – March 16, 1901	51st 52nd 53rd 54th 55th 56th 57th	Elected in 1888. Re-elected in 1890. Re-elected in 1892. Re-elected in 1894. Re-elected in 1896. Re-elected in 1898. Re-elected in 1900. Died.	1893–1903
Vacant		March 16, 1901 – November 5, 1901	57th		1893–1903
Henry B. Cassel (Marietta)	Republican	November 5, 1901 – March 3, 1903	57th	Elected to finish Brosius's term. Redistricted to the 9th district.	1893–1903
George Howell (Scranton)	Democratic	March 4, 1903 – February 10, 1904	58th	Lost contested election.	1903–1913
William Connell (Scranton)	Republican	February 10, 1904 – March 3, 1905	58th	Won contested election. [data missing]	1903–1913
Thomas H. Dale (Scranton)	Republican	March 4, 1905 – March 3, 1907	59th	Elected in 1904. Lost re-election.	1903–1913
Thomas D. Nicholls (Scranton)	Independent; Democratic	March 4, 1907 – March 3, 1911	60th 61st	Elected in 1906. Re-elected in 1908. Retired.	1903–1913
John R. Farr (Scranton)	Republican	March 4, 1911 – March 3, 1919	62nd 63rd 64th 65th	Elected in 1910. Re-elected in 1912. Re-elected in 1914. Re-elected in 1916. Lost re-election.	1903–1913
John R. Farr (Scranton)	Republican	March 4, 1911 – March 3, 1919	62nd 63rd 64th 65th	Elected in 1910. Re-elected in 1912. Re-elected in 1914. Re-elected in 1916. Lost re-election.	1913–1933
Patrick McLane (Scranton)	Democratic	March 4, 1919 – February 25, 1921	66th	Lost contested election.	1913–1933
John R. Farr (Scranton)	Republican	February 25, 1921 – March 3, 1921	66th	Won contested election. Lost renomination.	1913–1933
Charles R. Connell (Scranton)	Republican	March 4, 1921 – September 26, 1922	67th	Elected in 1920. Died.	1913–1933
		September 26, 1922 – March 3, 1923	67th	Vacant	1913–1933
William W. Griest (Lancaster)	Republican	March 4, 1923 – December 5, 1929	68th 69th 70th 71st	Redistricted from the 9th district and re-elected in 1922. Re-elected in 1924. Re-elected in 1926. Re-elected in 1928. Died.	1913–1933
		December 5, 1929 – January 28, 1930	71st	Vacant	1913–1933
J. Roland Kinzer (Lancaster)	Republican	January 28, 1930 – January 3, 1945	71st 72nd 73rd 74th 75th 76th 77th 78th	Elected to finish Griest's term. Re-elected in 1930. Re-elected in 1932. Re-elected in 1934. Re-elected in 1936. Re-elected in 1938. Re-elected in 1940. Re-elected in 1942. Redistricted to the 9th district.	1913–1933
J. Roland Kinzer (Lancaster)	Republican	January 28, 1930 – January 3, 1945	71st 72nd 73rd 74th 75th 76th 77th 78th	Elected to finish Griest's term. Re-elected in 1930. Re-elected in 1932. Re-elected in 1934. Re-elected in 1936. Re-elected in 1938. Re-elected in 1940. Re-elected in 1942. Redistricted to the 9th district.	1933–1943
John W. Murphy (Dunmore)	Democratic	January 3, 1945 – July 17, 1946	79th	Redistricted from the 11th district and re-elected in 1944. Resigned to become U.S. District Judge.	1943–1953
James P. Scoblick (Archbald)	Republican	November 5, 1946 – January 3, 1949	79th 80th	Elected to complete Murphy's term. Elected in 1946. Lost renomination.	1943–1953
Harry P. O'Neill (Dunmore)	Democratic	January 3, 1949 – January 3, 1953	81st 82nd	Elected in 1948. Re-elected in 1950. Lost renomination.	1943–1953
Joseph L. Carrigg (Susquehanna)	Republican	January 3, 1953 – January 3, 1959	83rd 84th 85th	Redistricted from the 14th district and re-elected in 1952. Re-elected in 1954. Re-elected in 1956. Lost renomination.	1953–1963
Stanley A. Prokop (Lake Ariel)	Democratic	January 3, 1959 – January 3, 1961	86th	Elected in 1958. Lost renomination.	1953–1963
William Scranton (Dalton)	Republican	January 3, 1961 – January 3, 1963	87th	Elected in 1960. Elected Governor of Pennsylvania.	1953–1963
Joseph M. McDade (Clarks Summit)	Republican	January 3, 1963 – January 3, 1999	88th 89th 90th 91st 92nd 93rd 94th 95th 96th 97th 98th 99th 100th 101st 102nd 103rd 104th 105th	Elected in 1962. Re-elected in 1964. Re-elected in 1966. Re-elected in 1968. Re-elected in 1970. Re-elected in 1972. Re-elected in 1974. Re-elected in 1976. Re-elected in 1978. Re-elected in 1980. Re-elected in 1982. Re-elected in 1984. Re-elected in 1986. Re-elected in 1988. Re-elected in 1990. Re-elected in 1992. Re-elected in 1994. Re-elected in 1996. Retired.	1963–1973
Joseph M. McDade (Clarks Summit)	Republican	January 3, 1963 – January 3, 1999	88th 89th 90th 91st 92nd 93rd 94th 95th 96th 97th 98th 99th 100th 101st 102nd 103rd 104th 105th	Elected in 1962. Re-elected in 1964. Re-elected in 1966. Re-elected in 1968. Re-elected in 1970. Re-elected in 1972. Re-elected in 1974. Re-elected in 1976. Re-elected in 1978. Re-elected in 1980. Re-elected in 1982. Re-elected in 1984. Re-elected in 1986. Re-elected in 1988. Re-elected in 1990. Re-elected in 1992. Re-elected in 1994. Re-elected in 1996. Retired.	1973–1983
Joseph M. McDade (Clarks Summit)	Republican	January 3, 1963 – January 3, 1999	88th 89th 90th 91st 92nd 93rd 94th 95th 96th 97th 98th 99th 100th 101st 102nd 103rd 104th 105th	Elected in 1962. Re-elected in 1964. Re-elected in 1966. Re-elected in 1968. Re-elected in 1970. Re-elected in 1972. Re-elected in 1974. Re-elected in 1976. Re-elected in 1978. Re-elected in 1980. Re-elected in 1982. Re-elected in 1984. Re-elected in 1986. Re-elected in 1988. Re-elected in 1990. Re-elected in 1992. Re-elected in 1994. Re-elected in 1996. Retired.	1983–1993
Joseph M. McDade (Clarks Summit)	Republican	January 3, 1963 – January 3, 1999	88th 89th 90th 91st 92nd 93rd 94th 95th 96th 97th 98th 99th 100th 101st 102nd 103rd 104th 105th	Elected in 1962. Re-elected in 1964. Re-elected in 1966. Re-elected in 1968. Re-elected in 1970. Re-elected in 1972. Re-elected in 1974. Re-elected in 1976. Re-elected in 1978. Re-elected in 1980. Re-elected in 1982. Re-elected in 1984. Re-elected in 1986. Re-elected in 1988. Re-elected in 1990. Re-elected in 1992. Re-elected in 1994. Re-elected in 1996. Retired.	1993–2003
Don Sherwood (Tunkhannock)	Republican	January 3, 1999 – January 3, 2007	106th 107th 108th 109th	Elected in 1998. Re-elected in 2000. Re-elected in 2002. Re-elected in 2004. Lost re-election.	1993–2003
Don Sherwood (Tunkhannock)	Republican	January 3, 1999 – January 3, 2007	106th 107th 108th 109th	Elected in 1998. Re-elected in 2000. Re-elected in 2002. Re-elected in 2004. Lost re-election.	2003–2013
Chris Carney (Dimock Township)	Democratic	January 3, 2007 – January 3, 2011	110th 111th	Elected in 2006. Re-elected in 2008. Lost re-election.	2003–2013
Tom Marino (Cogan Station)	Republican	January 3, 2011 – January 3, 2019	112th 113th 114th 115th	Elected in 2010. Re-elected in 2012. Re-elected in 2014. Re-elected in 2016. Redistricted to the 12th district.	2003–2013
Tom Marino (Cogan Station)	Republican	January 3, 2011 – January 3, 2019	112th 113th 114th 115th	Elected in 2010. Re-elected in 2012. Re-elected in 2014. Re-elected in 2016. Redistricted to the 12th district.	2013–2019
Scott Perry (Dillsburg)	Republican	January 3, 2019 – present	116th 117th 118th 119th	Redistricted from the 4th district and re-elected in 2018. Re-elected in 2020. Re-elected in 2022. Re-elected in 2024. Lost re-election.	2019–2023
Scott Perry (Dillsburg)	Republican	January 3, 2019 – present	116th 117th 118th 119th	Redistricted from the 4th district and re-elected in 2018. Re-elected in 2020. Re-elected in 2022. Re-elected in 2024. Lost re-election.	2023–present
Janelle Stelson	Democratic	Assuming office on January 3, 2027		Elected in 2026.	2023–present

== Recent elections ==
=== 2006 election ===
2006 United States House of Representatives elections: Pennsylvania District 10
Party	Candidate	Votes	%	±%
Democratic	Christopher Carney	110,115	52.90	
Republican	Don Sherwood	97,862	47.01	

=== 2008 election ===
2008 United States House of Representatives elections: Pennsylvania District 10
Party	Candidate	Votes	%	±%
Democratic	Christopher Carney (incumbent)	160,837	56.33	
Republican	Chris Hackett	124,681	43.67	

=== 2010 election ===
2010 United States House of Representatives elections: Pennsylvania District 10
Party	Candidate	Votes	%	±%
Republican	Tom Marino	109,603	55	
Democratic	Christopher Carney (incumbent)	89,170	45	

=== 2012 election ===
2012 10th Congressional District of Pennsylvania elections
Party	Candidate	Votes	%	±%
Republican	Tom Marino (Incumbent)	179,563	65.6	
Democratic	Phil Scollo	94,227	34.4	

=== 2014 election ===
2014 10th Congressional District of Pennsylvania elections
Party	Candidate	Votes	%	±%
Republican	Tom Marino (Incumbent)	112,851	62.6	
Democratic	Scott Brion	44,737	24.8	
Independent	Nick Troiano	22,734	12.6	

=== 2016 election ===
Rep. Tom Marino declared his intent to run for his 4th term and was uncontested in the Republican primary. Originally, no Democratic candidates filed to run for office, upon this revelation, Mike Molesevich, an environmental contractor and former Lewisburg mayor, announced he would seek a write-in campaign to get on the general election ballot. Write-in candidates need over 1,000 votes in the primary election to appear on the ballot in the 2016 general election. Mike Molesevich succeeded in his effort, receiving 2425 votes, earning a spot on the general election ballot. Jerry Kairnes of Lycoming County announced that he would seek to be on the November ballot as an independent, but dropped out after Molesevich earned a spot on the ballot

2016 10th Congressional District of Pennsylvania elections
Party	Candidate	Votes	%	±%
Republican	Tom Marino (Incumbent)	211,282	70.2	
Democratic	Michael Molesevich	89,823	29.8	

=== 2018 election ===
2018 10th congressional district of Pennsylvania election
Party	Candidate	Votes	%
Republican	Scott Perry (redistricted incumbent)	149,365	51.3
Democratic	George Scott	141,668	48.7
Total votes		291,033	100.0
Republican hold			

=== 2020 election ===
2020 10th congressional district of Pennsylvania election
Party	Candidate	Votes	%	±%
Republican	Scott Perry (Incumbent)	208,896	53.3	+2.0
Democratic	Eugene DePasquale	182,938	46.7	−2.0
Total votes		391,834	100.0	
Republican hold		Swing	+2.0	

=== 2022 election ===
2022 10th congressional district of Pennsylvania election
Party	Candidate	Votes	%
Republican	Scott Perry (incumbent)	169,331	53.8
Democratic	Shamaine Daniels	145,215	46.2
Total votes		314,546	100.0
Republican hold			

=== 2024 election ===
Pennsylvania's 10th congressional district, 2024
Party	Candidate	Votes	%
Republican	Scott Perry (incumbent)	205,567	50.6
Democratic	Janelle Stelson	200,434	49.4
Total votes		406,001	100.0
Republican hold			

== See also ==
- List of United States congressional districts
- Pennsylvania's congressional districts
