= 1800 Connecticut's at-large congressional district special election =

A special election was held in Connecticut's at-large congressional district on September 15, 1800 to fill a vacancy left by the resignation of Jonathan Brace (F) in May, 1800.

== Election results ==
Candidate	Party	Votes	Percent
John C. Smith	Federalist	2,916	45.4%
Elias Perkins	Federalist	1,315	20.5%
Timothy Pitkin	Federalist	669	10.4%
Simeon Baldwin	Federalist	642	10.0%
Benjamin Tallmadge	Federalist	365	5.7%
Calvin Goddard	Federalist	365	5.7%
John Treadwell	Federalist	116	1.8%
Stephen Hosmer	Unknown	34	0.5%

Smith took his seat on November 17, 1800, at the start of the 2nd session of the 6th Congress.

== See also ==
- List of special elections to the United States House of Representatives
