= John Hamilton (Pennsylvania politician) =

American politician

Member of the U.S. House of Representatives from Pennsylvania's 10th district
- In office March 4, 1805 – March 3, 1807
- Preceded by: John Hoge
- Succeeded by: William Hoge

Member of the Pennsylvania Senate
- In office 1796-1805

Personal details
- Born: November 25, 1754 York County, Province of Pennsylvania, British America
- Died: August 22, 1837 (aged 82) Ginger Hill, Pennsylvania, U.S.
- Party: Democratic-Republican

John Hamilton (November 25, 1754 – August 22, 1837) was a member of the United States House of Representatives from Pennsylvania.

== Biography ==
John Hamilton was born in York County (in the part that is now Adams County) in the Province of Pennsylvania. He moved to Washington County, Pennsylvania, in 1783. He was commissioned lieutenant colonel of militia in 1786 and brigadier general in 1800. He was major general of the Fourteenth Division of Militia of Washington and Greene Counties in 1807. He was appointed high sheriff of Washington County by Governor Thomas Mifflin in 1793 and served until November 1, 1796. He was a member of the Pennsylvania State Senate from 1796 to 1805 and an associate judge of Washington County from 1802 to 1805. He was a member of the first board of trustees of Jefferson college (now Washington & Jefferson College) in Washington, Pennsylvania, serving from 1802 to 1831.

Hamilton was elected as a Republican to the Ninth Congress. He was again appointed associate judge of Washington County on May 31, 1820, and served until his death at his home near Ginger Hill, Pennsylvania. Interment in Mingo Cemetery, near Monongahela, Pennsylvania.

U.S. House of Representatives
Preceded by John Hoge	Member of the U.S. House of Representatives from Pennsylvania's 10th congressional district 1805–1807	Succeeded by William Hoge
