= Ginger Hill, Pennsylvania =

Coordinates: 40°11′41″N 79°59′53″W

Ginger Hill
- Unincorporated community
- Interactive map of Ginger Hill
- Country: United States
- State: Pennsylvania
- County: Washington
- Time zone: UTC-5 (Eastern (EST))
  - Summer (DST): UTC-4 (EDT)

Ginger Hill, Pennsylvania is an unincorporated community in Washington County, Pennsylvania, United States. It is home to the Ebenezer Covered Bridge. The community's Grange was founded in 1912, and the local Grange Hall was built in few years later. In the 1920s it was known for the Ginger Hill Kennels, a business owned by John L. Davies and catering to the "aristocrats of dogdom."
