= John Thompson (1749–1823) =

American politician

Member of the U.S. House of Representatives from New York
- In office March 4, 1809 – March 3, 1811
- Preceded by: Peter Sailly
- Succeeded by: Benjamin Pond
- Constituency: 8th district
- In office March 4, 1807 – March 3, 1809
- Preceded by: Peter Sailly
- Succeeded by: Thomas R. Gold
- Constituency: 11th district
- In office March 4, 1799 – March 3, 1801
- Preceded by: John Evert Van Alen
- Succeeded by: David Thomas
- Constituency: 7th district

Member of the New York State Assembly from Albany County
- In office January 1, 1788 – December 31, 1789 Serving with John Duncan, John Lansing Jr., Cornelius Van Dyck, Henry K. Van Rensselaer, Jeremiah Van Rensselaer, John Younglove
- Preceded by: Leonard Gansevoort, James Gordon, Thomas Sickles, John De Peyster Ten Eyck, Dirck Van Ingen, Hezekiah Van Orden, John Younglove
- Succeeded by: Leonard Bronck, James Gordon, Richard Sill, Henry K. Van Rensselaer, Stephen Van Rensselaer, Cornelius Van Veghten, John Younglove

Personal details
- Born: March 20, 1749 Litchfield, Connecticut Colony, British America
- Died: September 30, 1823 (aged 74) Stillwater, New York, U.S.
- Resting place: Yellow Meeting House Cemetery, Stillwater, New York, U.S.
- Spouse: Frances "Fanney" McFarlane
- Children: 6
- Occupation: Farmer

John Thompson (March 20, 1749 – September 30, 1823) was a United States representative from New York.

== Biography ==
Thompson was born in Litchfield in the Connecticut Colony on March 20, 1749. He attended the common schools, and at the age of fourteen moved with his parents to Stillwater, where he became a farmer. Thompson served in the American Revolution as a captain, and commanded a company of the 13th Regiment of Albany County Militia, including participation in the Battles of Saratoga. He was appointed a justice of the peace in 1788 and was a member of the New York State Assembly in 1788 and 1789.

Thompson was elected as a Democratic-Republican to the 6th Congress, serving from March 4, 1799 to March 3, 1801. He was a delegate to the New York State Constitutional Convention in 1801. In 1791 Governor George Clinton appointed him first judge of Saratoga County, and he served until 1809.

Thompson was again elected to Congress in 1806, and he served in the 10th and 11th Congresses, March 4, 1807 to March 3, 1811.

He died in Stillwater on September 30, 1823, and was interred at Yellow Meeting House Cemetery in Stillwater.

U.S. House of Representatives
Preceded by John Evert Van Alen	Member of the U.S. House of Representatives from New York's 7th congressional district 1799–1801	Succeeded by David Thomas
Preceded by Peter Sailly	Member of the U.S. House of Representatives from New York's 11th congressional district 1807–1809	Succeeded by Thomas R. Gold
Preceded by James I. Van Alen	Member of the U.S. House of Representatives from New York's 8th congressional district 1809–1811	Succeeded by Benjamin Pond
