= 1798 Maryland's 7th congressional district special election =

A special election was held in Maryland's 7th congressional district on November 29, 1798, to fill a vacancy left by the death of Representative-election Joshua Seney (Democratic-Republican) before the start of the 6th United States Congress.

== Election results ==
Candidate	Party	Votes	Percent
Joseph H. Nicholson	Democratic-Republican	1,351	51.4%
John Goldsborough	Federalist	1,278	48.6%

Nicholson took his seat with the rest of the 6th Congress at the start of the 1st session.

== See also ==
- List of special elections to the United States House of Representatives
