= Peter Sailly =

American politician

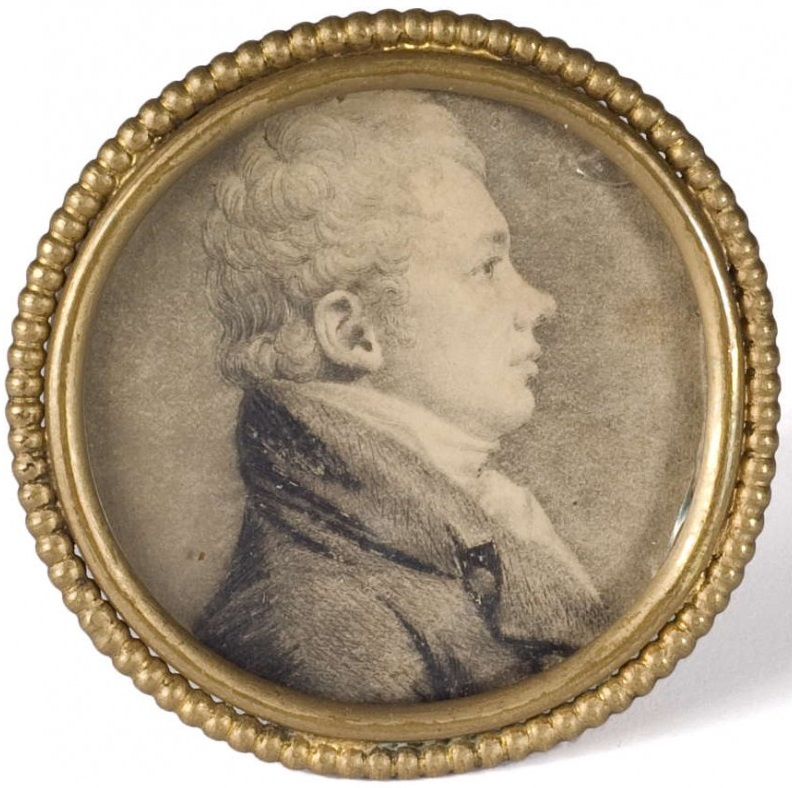
Peter Sailly, Congressman from New York

Peter Sailly (April 20, 1754 – March 16, 1826) was a politician and public official from Plattsburgh, New York. He served one term as a member of the United States House of Representatives.

== Biography ==
Sailly was born and educated in Lorraine, France, where he was involved in the iron manufacturing business. He immigrated to Philadelphia, Pennsylvania in 1783, purchased land from Zephaniah Platt, and settled in what is now Plattsburgh, New York. He was active in the lumber business, owned several stores, and was a successful fur trader and potash manufacturer. As a result of their shared interest in the fur business, Sailly formed a longstanding friendship with John Jacob Astor.

From 1788 to 1796 Sailly was an associate justice of the Court of Common Pleas. He was Plattsburgh's commissioner of highways and school commissioner in 1797 and 1798, and town supervisor in 1799 and 1800.

Sailly was a member of the New York State Assembly in 1803, and judge of the Clinton County court from 1804 to 1806.

In 1804 Sailly was elected to the Ninth Congress as a Democratic-Republican, and he served from March 4, 1805 to March 3, 1807.

Sailly was not a candidate for renomination in 1806. He was appointed U.S. Collector of Customs in Plattsburgh, and served from 1807 until his death.

During the War of 1812 Sailly was appointed keeper of the public stores, a position that gave him responsibility for all government warehouses in upstate New York. in addition, he provided U.S. commanders, including James Wilkinson, intelligence about the Champlain Valley and British troop activities in New York and southern Canada.

== Death and burial ==
He died in Plattsburgh on March 16, 1826. Sailly was buried at Plattsburgh's Riverside Cemetery.

== Family ==
Sailly was married twice. His first wife, Maria Louise Eleonore Caillat, died in 1786. In 1789 he married Marianne Adelaide Grielle, who died in 1830.

== Legacy ==
Sailly was the subject of a biographical work, 1919's Peter Sailly, Plattsburgh and Champlain Valley Pioneer (1754–1826): Extracts from his Diary and Letters, by George S. Bixby.

Sailly Avenue in Plattsburgh is named for him.

U.S. House of Representatives
Preceded by Beriah Palmer	Member of the U.S. House of Representatives from New York's 11th congressional district 1805–1807	Succeeded by John Thompson
