= Levi Casey (politician) =

American politician (c.1752–1807)

Member of the U.S. House of Representatives from South Carolina's 6th district
- In office March 4, 1803 – February 3, 1807
- Preceded by: Thomas Moore
- Succeeded by: Joseph Calhoun

Member of the South Carolina Senate
- In office 1800–1802
- In office 1781–1782

Member of the South Carolina House of Representatives
- In office 1798–1799
- In office 1792–1795
- In office 1786–1788

Personal details
- Born: c. 1752 Province of South Carolina, British America
- Died: February 3, 1807 (aged 54–55) Washington, D.C., U.S.
- Resting place: Congressional Cemetery, Washington, D.C.
- Party: Democratic-Republican

Military service
- Allegiance: United States
- Branch/service: South Carolina State Militia
- Rank: Brigadier General
- Battles/wars: American Revolutionary War

General Levi Casey (c. 1752 – February 3, 1807) was an American veteran of the Revolutionary War who served two terms as a United States representative from South Carolina from 1803 to 1807.

== Early life and Revolutionary War ==
He was born in the Province of South Carolina and served in the South Carolina militia during the American Revolutionary War. Son of Abner Casey and Harriet Green, he served in the American Revolutionary War fighting with the Scots-Irish "over-the-mountina men" at King's Mountain. He served with his brothers, Jesse, John, Benjamin, James, Moses, Randolph, and Christopher. One of his Cousins, Benjamin Casey (son of Peter) was killed in action at Camp Middlebrook, New Jersey. Levi married Elizabeth Duckett in 1775. He reached the rank of brigadier general in the South Carolina militia. After the war, he served as justice of Newberry County Court in 1785.

== State legislature ==
Casey was a member of the South Carolina Senate in 1781 and 1782 and 1800–1802 and a member of the South Carolina House of Representatives from 1786 to 1788, 1792 to 1795 and 1798 to 1799.

== Congress ==
He was elected as a Democratic-Republican to the Eighth and Ninth Congresses and served from March 4, 1803, until his death, before the close of the Ninth Congress. Prior to dying, he had been reelected to the Tenth Congress.

== Death and burial ==
He died in Washington, D.C., February 3, 1807 and was buried in the Congressional Cemetery.

== See also ==
- List of members of the United States Congress who died in office (1790–1899)

U.S. House of Representatives
Preceded by Thomas Moore	Member of the U.S. House of Representatives from South Carolina's 6th congressional district 1803–1807	Succeeded by Joseph Calhoun
