= Joseph Calhoun =

American politician

Member of the U.S. House of Representatives from South Carolina's 6th district
- In office June 2, 1807 – March 3, 1811
- Preceded by: Levi Casey
- Succeeded by: John C. Calhoun

Member of the South Carolina House of Representatives
- In office 1804–1805

Personal details
- Born: October 22, 1750 Staunton, Virginia Colony, British America
- Died: April 14, 1817 (aged 66) Calhoun Mills, South Carolina, U.S.
- Resting place: Mount Carmel, South Carolina
- Party: Democratic-Republican
- Profession: farmer

Military service
- Branch/service: South Carolina State Militia
- Rank: Colonel

Joseph Calhoun (October 22, 1750 – April 14, 1817) was a Democratic-Republican member of the South Carolina House of Representatives (1804–1805) and represented South Carolina in the United States House of Representatives (1807–1811). Born in Staunton in the Colony of Virginia, he moved with his father to the Province of South Carolina in 1756 and settled in Granville District, on Little River, near the present town of Abbeville.

Received a limited education and engaged in agricultural pursuits. He served as a member of the South Carolina House of Representatives in 1804 and 1805 and was a colonel of the state militia. In 1807 he was elected as a Republican to the 10th United States Congress to fill the vacancy for the 6th congressional district caused by the death of Levi Casey and was sworn in on June 2, 1807. He was re-elected to the 11th Congress and served until March 3, 1811. He declined to be a candidate for re-election in 1810 and was succeeded by his first cousin John C. Calhoun. He was also a cousin of both John C. Calhoun's wife, Floride and father-in-law, John E. Colhoun.

Calhoun returned to his agricultural pursuits and engaged in milling. He died in Calhoun Mills, Abbeville District (now Mount Carmel, South Carolina), and was buried there in the family cemetery.

U.S. House of Representatives
| Preceded by Levi Casey | Member of the U.S. House of Representatives from South Carolina's 6th congressional district 1807–1811 | Succeeded by John C. Calhoun |
