= Henry Woods (Pennsylvania politician) =

American politician

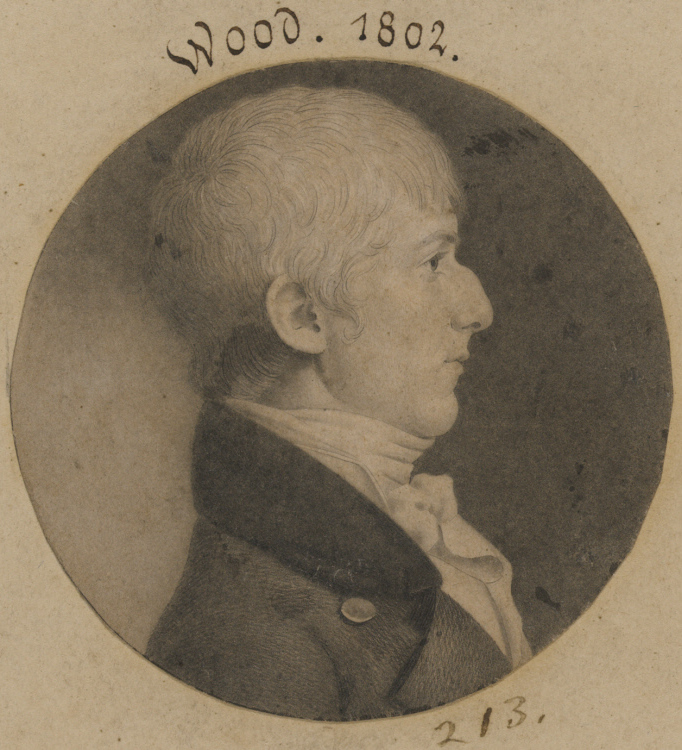

Member of the U.S. House of Representatives from Pennsylvania's 10th district
- In office March 4, 1799 – March 3, 1803
- Preceded by: David Bard
- Succeeded by: William Hoge

Personal details
- Born: 1764 Bedford, Province of Pennsylvania, British America
- Died: 1826 (aged 61–62) Bedford, Pennsylvania, U.S.
- Citizenship: United States
- Party: Federalist
- Profession: Attorney; land speculator

Henry Woods (1764–1826) was an American politician and land speculator who served as a United States representative from Pennsylvania.

== Early life ==
Born in Bedford in the Province of Pennsylvania, Woods had limited schooling, and attended the subscription schools of Bedford County. He studied law, was admitted to the bar in 1792, and began his practice in Bedford.

== Career ==
Elected as a Federalist to the Sixth and Seventh Congresses, Woods served as a United States Representative for the tenth district of Pennsylvania from March 4, 1799 to March 3, 1803.

He then returned to his business interests of land speculation and law as a lawyer.

== Death ==
Woods died in 1826 (age about 62 years). The location of his interment is unknown. His brother, John Woods, was also a U.S. Representative from Pennsylvania.

U.S. House of Representatives
Preceded by David Bard	Member of the U.S. House of Representatives from Pennsylvania's 10th congressional district 1799–1803	Succeeded by William Hoge
