= Aaron Lyle =

American politician

Aaron Lyle (November 17, 1759 – September 24, 1825) was a member of the U.S. House of Representatives from Pennsylvania.

Aaron Lyle was born in Mount Bethel, Pennsylvania. He served in the American Revolutionary War, and was a member of the Pennsylvania House of Representatives from 1797 to 1801. He served in the Pennsylvania State Senate from 1802 to 1804. He served as a commissioner of Washington County, Pennsylvania, from 1806 to 1809.

Lyle was elected as a Republican to the Eleventh and to the three succeeding Congresses. He resumed agricultural pursuits and served as an original trustee of Jefferson (later Washington and Jefferson) College in Canonsburg, Pennsylvania, from 1802 to 1822. He died at Cross Creek, Pennsylvania. Interment in the Old Cemetery.

== Sources ==
- United States Congress. "Aaron Lyle (id: L000524)". Biographical Directory of the United States Congress.
- Aaron Lyle at The Political Graveyard

U.S. House of Representatives
Preceded by William Hoge	Member of the U.S. House of Representatives from Pennsylvania's 10th congressional district 1809–1813	Succeeded by Jared Irwin; Isaac Smith
Preceded by District Created	Member of the U.S. House of Representatives from Pennsylvania's 12th congressional district 1813–1817	Succeeded by Thomas Patterson
