= John Hoge =

American politician (1760–1824)

Member of the U.S. House of Representatives from Pennsylvania's 10th district
- In office November 2, 1804 – March 3, 1805
- Preceded by: William Hoge
- Succeeded by: John Hamilton

Member of the Pennsylvania Senate
- In office 1790-1795

Personal details
- Born: September 10, 1760 Hogestown, Province of Pennsylvania, British America
- Died: August 4, 1824 (aged 63) Meadowlands, Pennsylvania, U.S.
- Party: Democratic-Republican

John Hoge (September 10, 1760 – August 4, 1824) was a member of the United States House of Representatives from Pennsylvania.

== Biography ==
Hoge was born near Hogestown in the Province of Pennsylvania. He served in the Revolutionary War as ensign in the Ninth Pennsylvania Regiment. In 1782 he moved to what is now Washington, Pennsylvania, which he and his brother, William Hoge, founded. He was a delegate to the State constitutional convention in 1790, and a member of the Pennsylvania State Senate from 1790 to 1795.

A Republican, Hoge was elected to the Eighth Congress to fill the vacancy caused by the resignation of his brother, William Hoge. In 1791, he was elected to the American Philosophical Society. He died at Meadow Lands, Pennsylvania in 1824 and is buried in Washington Cemetery at Washington, Pennsylvania.

U.S. House of Representatives
Preceded by William Hoge	Member of the U.S. House of Representatives from Pennsylvania's 10th congressional district 1804–1805	Succeeded by John Hamilton
