= William Hoge (Pennsylvania politician) =

American politician

Member of the U.S. House of Representatives from Pennsylvania
- In office March 4, 1807 – March 3, 1809
- Preceded by: John Hamilton
- Succeeded by: Aaron Lyle
- Constituency: 10th district
- In office March 4, 1801 – October 15, 1804
- Preceded by: Albert Gallatin
- Succeeded by: John Hoge
- Constituency: 12th district (1801–1803); 10th district (1803–1804)

Member of the Pennsylvania House of Representatives
- In office 1796-1797

Personal details
- Born: 1762 Hogestown, Province of Pennsylvania, British America
- Died: September 25, 1814 (aged 51–52) Washington, Pennsylvania, US
- Party: Democratic-Republican

William Hoge (1762 – September 25, 1814) was a member of the United States House of Representatives from Pennsylvania.

== Biography ==
Hoge was born near Hogestown in the Province of Pennsylvania. He received a limited schooling and moved to western Pennsylvania in 1782, where he and his brother John Hoge founded the town of Washington, Pennsylvania. He was a member of the Pennsylvania House of Representatives in 1796 and 1797.

Hoge was elected in a special election as a Democratic-Republican to the Seventh and Eighth United States Congresses and served until his resignation on October 15, 1804. He was one of six Democratic-Republican representatives to oppose passage of the Twelfth Amendment to the United States Constitution. Hoge was again elected to the Tenth Congress. He retired to his farm near Washington, Pennsylvania, where he died in 1814. He was interred in the "Old Graveyard."

== Sources ==
- United States Congress. "William Hoge (id: H000699)". Biographical Directory of the United States Congress.

U.S. House of Representatives
Preceded by Albert Gallatin	Member of the U.S. House of Representatives from Pennsylvania's 12th congressional district 1801–1803	Succeeded by District eliminated
Preceded by Henry Woods	Member of the U.S. House of Representatives from Pennsylvania's 10th congressional district 1803–1804	Succeeded by John Hoge
Preceded by John Hamilton	Member of the U.S. House of Representatives from Pennsylvania's 10th congressional district 1807–1809	Succeeded by Aaron Lyle
