= Diane Koken =

American politician

- Born: M. Diane Koken; Lancaster, Pennsylvania
- Occupations: Legal and regulatory consultant and court-appointed special advocate for children (CASA)
- Known for: Insurance Commissioner of the Pennsylvania Department of Insurance (1997-1998)

M. Diane Koken is an American legal and regulatory consultant who serves as a court-appointed special advocate for children (CASA) in Pennsylvania.

She is also a former Insurance Commissioner of the Pennsylvania Department of Insurance, and currently serves on the boards of multiple organizations across the Commonwealth of Pennsylvania.

== Biography ==
Born in Lancaster, Pennsylvania, Koken graduated from Penn Manor High School, was subsequently awarded a bachelor's degree from Millersville University of Pennsylvania, magna cum laude in 1972, and a Juris Doctor degree from the Charles Widger School of Law at Villanova University in 1975.

She then began her insurance industry career with the Provident Mutual Life Insurance Company of Philadelphia, ultimately working her way up to become vice president, general counsel and corporate secretary.

Koken served as the Insurance Commissioner of the Commonwealth of Pennsylvania from 1997 to 2007. She was appointed acting commissioner by Pennsylvania Governor Tom Ridge in July 2007 and was then confirmed by the Pennsylvania State Senate as commissioner later that same year. During her decade-long tenure, in which she subsequently served under Pennsylvania governors Mark Schweiker and Ed Rendell, and became the second longest-serving insurance commissioner in the state's history (as of 2007), the agency undertook seven thousand field investigations and market-conduct examinations, which resulted in three hundred and seventeen million dollars in civil penalty restitutions and more than sixty-nine million dollars in restitutions paid to consumers who filed insurance-related complaints. In addition, the agency established a consumer liaison unit, significantly increased the number of children enrolled in the Children's Health Insurance Program (CHIP), created a basic health insurance program for low-income adults, and implemented the Mcare malpractice insurance abatement program.

In 2007, Koken was elected to the board of directors of the Nationwide Mutual Insurance Company.

In 2019, she was elected to the boards of directors of the Nationwide Mutual Funds and the Nationwide Variable Insurance Trusts.

Previously appointed as the first chair of the Interstate Insurance Product Regulation Commission, she also served as vice chair of the International Commission on Holocaust Era Insurance Claims and as president of the National Association of Insurance Commissioners. During her tenure with the Holocaust Era Insurance Claims commission, more than fifteen hundred Holocaust victims and their families were assisted with filing insurance claims for property that had been plundered by Nazis during World War II.

A member of the Women's Council of the United Way, she also currently serves on the boards of directors of Capital Blue Cross, The Hershey Company, the Hershey Trust Company, The M.S. Hershey Foundation, and the Milton Hershey School. Appointed to the Milton Hershey School's board in 2016, she has served as the board's chair since 2021.
