= 1813 Pennsylvania's 5th congressional district special election =

On April 8, 1813, Representative Robert Whitehill (DR) of Pennsylvania's 5th district died in office. A special election was held on May 11, 1813 to fill the vacancy left by his death.

== Election results ==
| Candidate | Party | Votes | Percent |
|---|---|---|---|
| John Rea | Democratic-Republican | 2,534 | 55.7% |
| Edward Crawford | Federalist | 2,011 | 44.3% |

Rea took his seat on May 28, 1813.

== See also ==
- List of special elections to the United States House of Representatives
