= List of former United States representatives (Y) =

This is a complete list of former United States representatives whose last names begin with the letter Y.

== Number of years and terms the member has served ==
The number of years the representative/delegate has served in Congress indicates the number of terms the representative/delegate has. Note the representative/delegate can also serve non-consecutive terms if the representative/delegate loses election and wins re-election to the House.

- 2 years - 1 or 2 terms
- 4 years - 2 or 3 terms
- 6 years - 3 or 4 terms
- 8 years - 4 or 5 terms
- 10 years - 5 or 6 terms
- 12 years - 6 or 7 terms
- 14 years - 7 or 8 terms
- 16 years - 8 or 9 terms
- 18 years - 9 or 10 terms
- 20 years - 10 or 11 terms
- 22 years - 11 or 12 terms
- 24 years - 12 or 13 terms
- 26 years - 13 or 14 terms
- 28 years - 14 or 15 terms
- 30 years - 15 or 16 terms
- 32 years - 16 or 17 terms
- 34 years - 17 or 18 terms
- 36 years - 18 or 19 terms
- 38 years - 19 or 20 terms
- 40 years - 20 or 21 terms
- 42 years - 21 or 22 terms
- 44 years - 22 or 23 terms
- 46 years - 23 or 24 terms
- 48 years - 24 or 25 terms
- 50 years - 25 or 26 terms
- 52 years - 26 or 27 terms
- 54 years - 27 or 28 terms
- 56 years - 28 or 29 terms
- 58 years - 29 or 30 terms

Name	Term	State/ Territory	Party	Lifespan
Bartlett Yancey	1813–1817	North Carolina	Democratic-Republican	1785–1828
Joel Yancey	1827–1831	Kentucky	Democratic	1773–1838
William L. Yancey	1844–1846	Alabama	Democratic	1814–1863
Teodoro R. Yangco	1917–1920	Philippines	None	1861–1939
George L. Yaple	1883–1885	Michigan	Democratic	1851–1939
Robert M. Yardley	1887–1891	Pennsylvania	Republican	1850–1902
John Yarmuth	2007–2023	Kentucky	Democratic	1947–present
John B. Yates	1815–1817	New York	Democratic-Republican	1784–1836
Richard Yates Sr.	1851–1855	Illinois	Whig	1815–1873
Richard Yates Jr.	1919–1933	Illinois	Republican	1860–1936
Sidney Yates	1949–1963; 1965–1999	Illinois	Democratic	1909–2000
Gus Yatron	1969–1993	Pennsylvania	Democratic	1927–2003
George H. Yeaman	1862–1865	Kentucky	Unionist	1829–1908
Jesse Johnson Yeates	1875–1879; 1881	North Carolina	Democratic	1829–1892
Archibald Yell	1836–1839; 1845–1846	Arkansas	Democratic	1797–1847
C. H. Yoakum	1895–1897	Texas	Democratic	1849–1909
Seth H. Yocum	1879–1881	Pennsylvania	Greenbacker	1834–1895
Kevin Yoder	2011–2019	Kansas	Republican	1976–present
Samuel S. Yoder	1887–1891	Ohio	Democratic	1841–1921
Ted Yoho	2013–2021	Florida	Republican	1955–present
Tom Yon	1927–1933	Florida	Democratic	1882–1971
Tyre York	1883–1885	North Carolina	Independent Democrat	1836–1916
Thomas Jones Yorke	1837–1839; 1841–1843	New Jersey	Whig	1801–1882
Sam Yorty	1951–1955	California	Democratic	1909–1998
Jacob Yost	1887–1889; 1897–1899	Virginia	Republican	1853–1933
Jacob Senewell Yost	1843–1847	Pennsylvania	Democratic	1801–1872
Henry M. Youmans	1891–1893	Michigan	Democratic	1832–1920
Andrew Young	1973–1977	Georgia	Democratic	1932–present
Augustus Young	1841–1843	Vermont	Whig	1784–1857
Bill Young	1971–2013	Florida	Republican	1930–2013
Bryan Young	1845–1847	Kentucky	Whig	1800–1882
Clarence Clifton Young	1953–1957	Nevada	Republican	1922–2016
David Young	2015–2019	Iowa	Republican	1968–present
Don Young	1973–2022	Alaska	Republican	1933–2022
Ebenezer Young	1829–1835	Connecticut	National Republican	1783–1851
Edward Lunn Young	1973–1975	South Carolina	Republican	1920–2017
George M. Young	1913–1924	North Dakota	Republican	1870–1932
H. Casey Young	1875–1881; 1883–1885	Tennessee	Democratic	1828–1899
H. Olin Young	1903–1913	Michigan	Republican	1850–1917
Isaac D. Young	1911–1913	Kansas	Republican	1849–1927
J. Smith Young	1878–1879	Louisiana	Democratic	1834–1916
James Young	1911–1921	Texas	Democratic	1866–1942
James R. Young	1897–1903	Pennsylvania	Republican	1847–1924
John Young	1836–1837; 1841–1843	New York	Whig	1802–1852
John Andrew Young	1957–1979	Texas	Democratic	1916–2002
John Duncan Young	1873–1875	Kentucky	Democratic	1823–1910
Pierce M. B. Young	1868–1869; 1870–1875	Georgia	Democratic	1836–1896
Richard Young	1909–1911	New York	Republican	1846–1935
Robert A. Young	1977–1987	Missouri	Democratic	1923–2007
Samuel H. Young	1973–1975	Illinois	Republican	1922–2017
Stephen M. Young	1933–1937; 1941–1943; 1949–1951	Ohio	Democratic	1889–1984
Thomas L. Young	1879–1883	Ohio	Republican	1832–1888
Timothy R. Young	1849–1851	Illinois	Democratic	1811–1898
Todd Young	2011–2017	Indiana	Republican	1972–present
William Albin Young	1897–1898; 1899–1900	Virginia	Democratic	1860–1928
William S. Young	1825–1827	Kentucky	National Republican	1790–1827
Harold F. Youngblood	1947–1949	Michigan	Republican	1907–1983
Oscar Youngdahl	1939–1943	Minnesota	Republican	1893–1946
J. Arthur Younger	1953–1967	California	Republican	1893–1967
David Levy Yulee	1841–1845	Florida	Democratic	1810–1886
