= Joel Ario =

American politician

Joel Ario was Commissioner of the Pennsylvania Department of Insurance.

In 2009, he became director of the Office of Insurance Exchanges at the U.S. Department of Health and Human Services.

Ario holds a B.A. from St. Olaf College, a Master of Divinity degree (M.Div.) from Harvard Divinity School and a Juris Doctor degree from Harvard Law School. He currently works with Leavitt Partners.
