= William Crawford (Pennsylvania politician) =

American politician

Member of the U.S. House of Representatives from Pennsylvania
- In office March 4, 1809 – March 3, 1817
- Preceded by: James Kelly
- Succeeded by: William Maclay, Andrew Boden
- Constituency: 6th district (1809–1813); 5th district (1813–1817)

Personal details
- Born: 1760 Paisley, Scotland, Kingdom of Great Britain
- Died: October 23, 1823 (aged 62–63) Gettysburg, Pennsylvania, U.S.
- Party: Democratic-Republican

William Crawford (1760 – October 23, 1823) was a member of the United States House of Representatives from Pennsylvania and a slaveholder.

Crawford was born in Paisley, Scotland, in 1760. He received a liberal schooling, studied medicine at the University of Edinburgh, and in 1781 received his degree. He emigrated to the United States and settled near Gettysburg, Pennsylvania. He purchased a farm on Marsh Creek in 1785, where he spent the rest of his life practicing medicine. He was an associate judge for Adams County, Pennsylvania, from 1801 to 1808.

Crawford was elected as a Democratic-Republican to the Eleventh and to the three succeeding Congresses. He again resumed the practice of medicine near Gettysburg where he died in 1823. Interment in Evergreen Cemetery in Gettysburg.

== Sources ==
- United States Congress. "William Crawford (id: C000894)". Biographical Directory of the United States Congress.
- The Political Graveyard

U.S. House of Representatives
Preceded by James Kelly	Member of the U.S. House of Representatives from Pennsylvania's 6th congressional district 1809–1813	Succeeded by Samuel D. Ingham; Robert Brown
Preceded by George Smith	Member of the U.S. House of Representatives from Pennsylvania's 5th congressional district 1813–1817; 1813 alongside: Robert Whitehill 1813–1815 alongside: John Rea; 1815–1817 alongside: William Maclay	Succeeded by William Maclay; Andrew Boden

...
