= Francis R. Smith =

American politician

Frank R. Smith
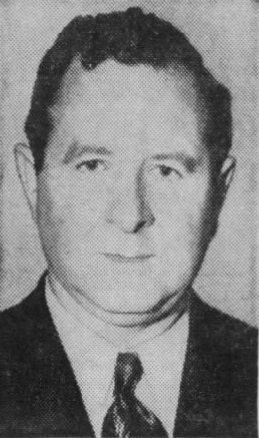
- Intelligencer Journal (Lancaster, Pennsylvania), January 17, 1955

Chairman of the Philadelphia Democratic City Committee
- In office December 28, 1963 – December 1, 1967
- Preceded by: William J. Green Jr.
- Succeeded by: William J. Green III

Pennsylvania Insurance Commissioner
- In office January 18, 1955 – January 15, 1963
- Governor: George Leader; David Lawrence
- Preceded by: James F. Malone Jr.
- Succeeded by: Audrey Kelly

Member of the U.S. House of Representatives from Pennsylvania's 5th district
- In office January 3, 1941 – January 3, 1943
- Preceded by: Fred Gartner
- Succeeded by: Fred Pracht

Personal details
- Born: September 25, 1911 Philadelphia, Pennsylvania
- Died: December 9, 1982 (aged 71) Somerton, Philadelphia, Pennsylvania
- Party: Democratic
- Education: St. Joseph’s College

Francis Raphael Smith (September 25, 1911 – December 9, 1982) was a Democratic member of the U.S. House of Representatives from Pennsylvania.

== Formative years ==
Born in Philadelphia, all four of Smith's grandparents were Irish immigrants.

Smith graduated from St. Joseph's College in Philadelphia in 1933, and from the law department of Temple University in Philadelphia in 1938.

== Career ==
Smith was employed as a bank examiner with the Pennsylvania State Banking Department in 1938 and 1939. He unsuccessfully sought election to one of Philadelphia County's allotted at-large seats in the Pennsylvania State House of Representatives in 1938.

Smith was elected as a Democrat to the 77th Congress, but was an unsuccessful candidate for reelection in 1942.

After his term in Congress, he became a United States Marshal for the eastern district of Pennsylvania, serving from January 29, 1943, until his resignation on April 30, 1945.

He was then appointed collector of internal revenue at Philadelphia on May 1, 1945, and served in that capacity until 1952.

He ran for Register of Wills in Philadelphia in 1953, but was unsuccessful. In 1955, Governor George Leader appointed Smith State Insurance Commissioner.

In December 1963, he was elected to succeed the recently deceased Congressman Bill Green as Chairman of the Philadelphia Democratic Party. He was also an elected member of the Board of Revision of Taxes of Philadelphia and member of Board of View of Philadelphia.

== Death and interment ==
Smith died in Somerton, Philadelphia on December 9, 1982, and was interred at Holy Sepulchre Cemetery in Cheltenham Township, Pennsylvania.

== Sources ==
U.S. House of Representatives
Preceded by Fred C. Gartner	Member of the U.S. House of Representatives from Pennsylvania's 5th congressional district 1941-1943	Succeeded by C. Frederick Pracht
Political offices
Preceded by James F. Malone Jr.	Pennsylvania Insurance Commissioner; 1955–1963	Succeeded by Audrey Kelly
Party political offices
Preceded by Genevieve Blatt	Democratic nominee for Pennsylvania Auditor General; 1956	Succeeded by Thomas Z. Minehart
Preceded by William J. Green Jr.	Chairman of the Philadelphia Democratic City Committee; 1963–1967	Succeeded by William J. Green III
