= Jacob Yost =

Jacob Yost may refer to:

- Jacob Yost (Virginia politician) (1853–1933), American politician from Virginia
- Jacob Senewell Yost (1801–1872), American politician from Pennsylvania
