= John McNair =

John McNair is the name of:

- John B. McNair, Premier of New Brunswick
- John M. McNair, Senator from New Brunswick
- John Frederick Adolphus McNair, British civil servant based in India
- John McNair (congressman), from Pennsylvania
- John McNair (UK politician), General Secretary of the Independent Labour Party

== See also ==
- John McNairy, American judge
