= John Freedley =

American politician (1793–1851)

Member of the U.S. House of Representatives from Pennsylvania's 5th district
- In office March 4, 1847 – March 3, 1851
- Preceded by: Jacob Senewell Yost
- Succeeded by: John McNair

Personal details
- Born: May 22, 1793 Norristown, Pennsylvania, U.S.
- Died: December 8, 1851 (aged 58) Norristown, Pennsylvania, U.S.
- Resting place: Montgomery Cemetery, West Norriton Township, Pennsylvania, U.S.
- Party: Whig
- Parent(s): Henry Freedley; Catharine Isett
- Education: Norristown Academy
- Profession: Politician, lawyer, businessman

John Freedley (May 22, 1793 – December 8, 1851) was an American politician, lawyer, and businessman who served in the United States House of Representatives from 1847 to 1851, representing the 5th congressional district of Pennsylvania as a member of the Whig Party.

== Early life and education ==
John Freedley was born in Norristown, Pennsylvania on May 22, 1793 to Henry Freedley and Catharine Isett. He attended public schools and Norristown Academy. Freedley studied law.

Freedley served as an assistant to his father, who operated a brickyard.

== Career ==
Freedley was admitted to the bar in 1820; he commenced practice in Norristown. He also operated a marble quarry, which he sold in 1844.

Freedley served in the United States House of Representatives from 1847 to 1851, representing the 5th congressional district of Pennsylvania as a member of the Whig Party. He served in the 30th United States Congress and the 31st United States Congress. During his time in office, Freedley served on the Committee on Revolutionary Pensions.

Freedley's time in office began on March 4, 1847 and concluded on March 3, 1851. He was preceded by Jacob S. Yost and succeeded by John McNair.

Following his tenure in Congress, Freedley opened a soapstone quarry along the Schuylkill River in Whitemarsh Township, which he operated until his death.

== Death ==
Freedley died at the age of 58 in Norristown on December 8, 1851. He was interred at Montgomery Cemetery, located in West Norriton Township.

U.S. House of Representatives
Preceded by Jacob Senewell Yost	Member of the U.S. House of Representatives from Pennsylvania's 5th congressional district 1847–1851	Succeeded by John McNair
