= Peter E. Costello =

American politician (1854-1935)

Peter Edward Costello
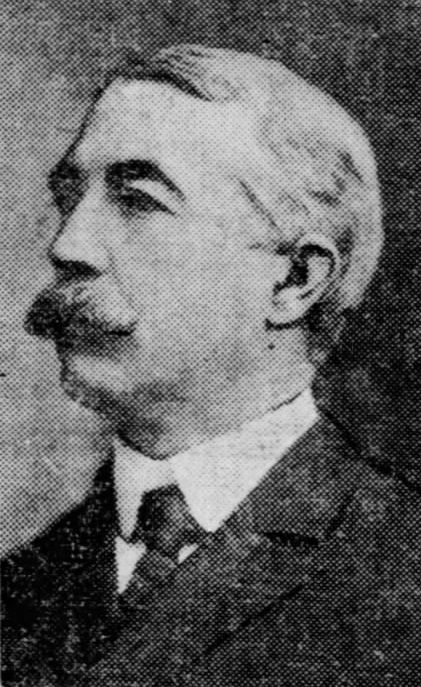

Member of the U.S. House of Representatives from Pennsylvania's 5th district
- In office March 4, 1915 – March 3, 1921
- Preceded by: Michael Donohoe
- Succeeded by: James J. Connolly

Personal details
- Born: June 27, 1854 Boston, Massachusetts, U.S.
- Died: October 23, 1935 (aged 81) Philadelphia, Pennsylvania, U.S.
- Resting place: West Laurel Hill Cemetery, Bala Cynwyd, Pennsylvania, U.S.
- Party: Republican

Peter Edward Costello (June 27, 1854 – October 23, 1935) was an American politician who served as a Republican member of the United States House of Representatives for Pennsylvania's 5th congressional district from 1915 to 1921.

== Early life ==
Costello was born on June 27, 1854, in Boston, Massachusetts, to Edward and Cecelia Costello and attended public school. In 1877, he moved to Philadelphia and worked in construction, manufacturing, and real estate development. He worked eleven years for Disston & Sons, developed large sections of Tacony, established the Suburban Electric Lighting Company, and the Tacony, Holmesburg & Frankford Street Railway Company. He worked as vice-president and treasurer of the Millard Construction Company which built the Market Street subway line in Philadelphia.

== Career ==
He served as a member of the common council of Philadelphia from 1895 to 1903, and director of the department of public works of Philadelphia from 1903 to 1905. He supervised the construction of the Torresdale Water Works.

Costello and David J. Smyth were asked to resign from their city government positions by mayor John Weaver. Both Costello and Smyth refused to resign and were dismissed by Weaver for their roles in sponsoring legislation to provide the United Gas Improvement Company a beneficial 75-year lease to the detriment of taxpayers at the recommendation of political boss Israel W. Durham. The stated reason for the dismissal of Costello was "serving the interests of the organization and deceiving his superior". Costello and Smyth challenged the dismissal and were allowed to retire.

He was again a member of the common council from 1908 to 1915. He introduced legislation that funded the creation of Roosevelt Boulevard and the Frankford elevated rail line.

He was elected as a Republican to the Sixty-fourth, Sixty-fifth, and Sixty-sixth Congresses. He was not a candidate for renomination in 1920. He continued to work in real estate development and investment brokerage.

He died at his home in the Tacony neighborhood of Philadelphia on October 23, 1935. He was interred at West Laurel Hill Cemetery in Bala Cynwyd, Pennsylvania.

== References and sources ==
U.S. House of Representatives
Preceded by Michael Donohoe	Member of the U.S. House of Representatives from Pennsylvania's 5th congressional district 1915–1921	Succeeded by James J. Connolly
