= C. Frederick Pracht =

American politician

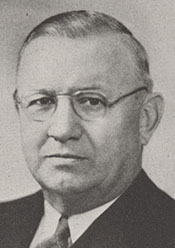
Pracht circa 1943. Photo collection of the U.S. House of Representatives.

Charles Frederick Pracht (October 20, 1880 – December 22, 1950) was a Republican member of the U.S. House of Representatives from Pennsylvania.

== Biography ==
C. Frederick Pracht was born in Pitman, Pennsylvania on October 20, 1880. (Note: Pracht's birthplace is given as various locations in different documents. These include Pitman, Pennsylvania, Pitman, New Jersey, France, and Germany.) He was active in the toy, novelty and notions business from 1897 to 1914. He was children's agent and investigator in the Philadelphia County commissioner's office from 1915 to 1929, and served in the department of accounts under the clerk of quarters sessions in 1930 and 1931. He was personal property assessor in the board of revision department from 1932 to 1942. Pracht was member of Philadelphia's Republican executive ward committee beginning in 1904, and served as chairman for twenty-five years.

Pracht was elected as a Republican to the 78th Congress (1943 to 1945), but was an unsuccessful candidate for reelection in 1944. During his term, Pracht was a member of the Accounts, and Civil Service committees.

== Death and interment ==
Pracht died in Philadelphia on December 22, 1950. He was interred at Lawnview Memorial Park in Rockledge, Pennsylvania.

== Notes ==
U.S. House of Representatives
Preceded by Francis R. Smith	Member of the U.S. House of Representatives from Pennsylvania's 5th congressional district 1943-1945	Succeeded by William J. Green Jr.
