= William W. Foulkrod =

American politician

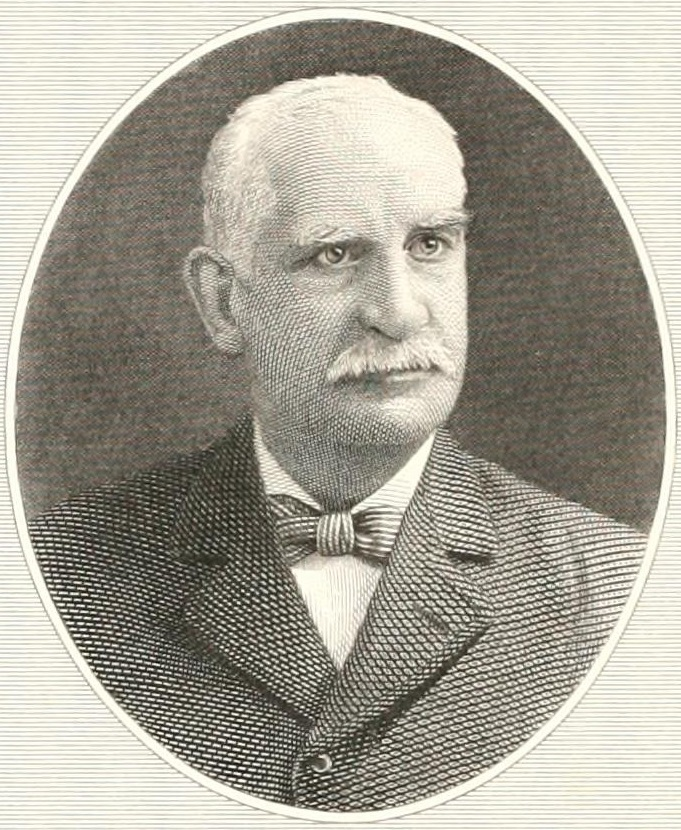
- From 1911's William W. Foulkrod, Late a Representative from Pennsylvania.

Member of the U.S. House of Representatives from Pennsylvania's 5th district
- In office March 4, 1907 – November 13, 1910
- Preceded by: Edward de Veaux Morrell
- Succeeded by: Michael Donohoe

Personal details
- Born: November 22, 1846 Frankford, Pennsylvania, US
- Died: November 13, 1910 (aged 63) Philadelphia, Pennsylvania, US
- Party: Republican

William Walker Foulkrod (November 22, 1846 – November 13, 1910) was a Republican member of the United States House of Representatives from Pennsylvania.

== Biography ==
William Walker Foulkrod was born in Frankford, then a borough outside Philadelphia. He was engaged in the wholesale dry-goods business and the manufacture of hosiery. He was the first president of the Philadelphia Trades League, and interested in plans for the improvement of the Delaware River and Channel.

He graduated from Amherst College in 1869 with a bachelor's degree, and earned a master's degree from Cornell University in 1873.

He was married to Mary Clara Young (Sep. 22, 1846 in Philadelphia, Pennsylvania - Aug. 2, 1921 in Bar Harbor, Maine) from 1871 to his death in 1910.

Foulkrod was elected as a Republican to the Sixtieth and Sixty-first Congresses and served until his death in Frankford. He had been an unsuccessful candidate for reelection just a few days before. He was interred in Cedar Hill Cemetery in Philadelphia.

== See also ==
- List of members of the United States Congress who died in office (1900–1949)

== Sources ==
- United States Congress. "William W. Foulkrod (id: F000318)". Biographical Directory of the United States Congress.
- William W. Foulkrod at The Political Graveyard
- William W. Foulkrod, Late a Representative from Pennsylvania. Washington, DC: US Government Printing Office. 1911.

U.S. House of Representatives
Preceded by Edward de Veaux Morrell	Member of the U.S. House of Representatives from Pennsylvania's 5th congressional district 1907–1910	Succeeded by Michael Donohoe
