= George Smith (Pennsylvania politician) =

American politician

George Smith was an early 19th-century member of the United States House of Representatives from Pennsylvania's 5th congressional district.

He was elected as a Democratic-Republican to the Eleventh and Twelfth Congresses, serving from March 4, 1809, to March 3, 1813. Very little information about Smith has survived; the dates and places of his birth and death are unknown.

U.S. House of Representatives
Preceded by Daniel Montgomery Jr.	Member of the U.S. House of Representatives from Pennsylvania's 5th congressional district 1809–1813	Succeeded by Robert Whitehill; William Crawford
