= Michael Donohoe =

American politician

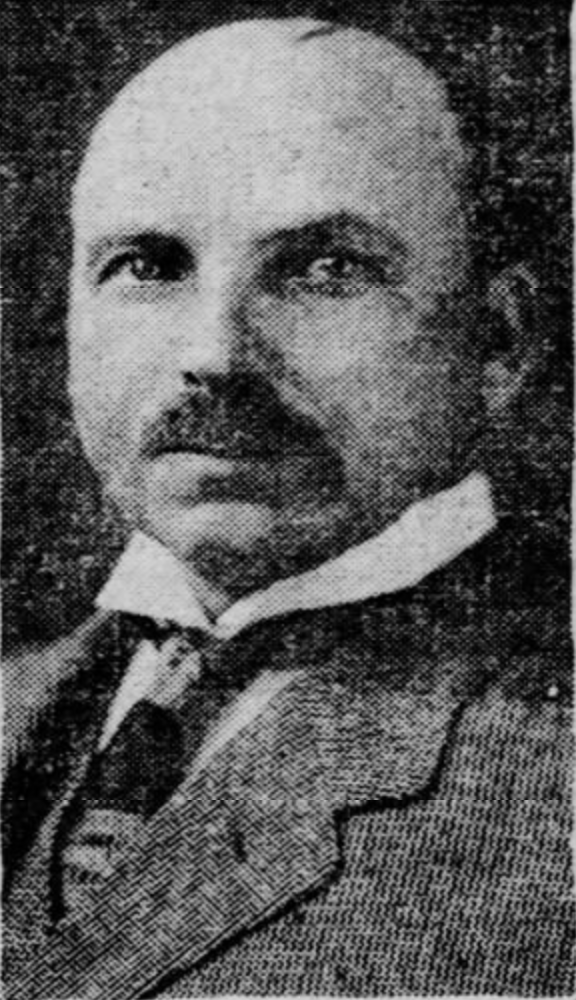

Member of the U.S. House of Representatives from Pennsylvania's 5th district
- In office March 4, 1911 – March 3, 1915
- Preceded by: William Walker Foulkrod
- Succeeded by: Peter E. Costello

Personal details
- Born: February 22, 1864 Killeshandra, County Cavan, Ireland
- Died: January 17, 1958 (aged 93) Philadelphia, Pennsylvania, U.S.
- Party: Democratic

Michael Donohoe (February 22, 1864 – January 17, 1958) of Philadelphia was a U.S. representative from Pennsylvania from 1911 to 1915. He was an Irish Catholic Democrat.

== Biography ==
Michael Donohoe was born in Killeshandra, County Cavan, Ireland. He attended a private classical school, and taught as principal of a national school from January 1885 until October 1886. He immigrated to the United States and settled in Philadelphia, Pennsylvania, on November 8, 1886. He worked as a real-estate broker, and engaged in banking and in the manufacture of glassware.

Donohoe was elected as a Democrat to the Sixty-second and Sixty-third Congresses. He was an unsuccessful candidate for reelection in 1914. He was a candidate for mayor of Philadelphia, Pennsylvania in 1931. He also served as director of Northwestern General Hospital from 1893 to 1943, and as a trustee of Temple University. He was the real-estate assessor for the city of Philadelphia from April 15, 1919, to March 31, 1946, when he retired. He died in Philadelphia in 1958 and was interred in Holy Sepulchre Cemetery in Cheltenham Township, Pennsylvania.

U.S. House of Representatives
Preceded by William Walker Foulkrod	Member of the U.S. House of Representatives from Pennsylvania's 5th congressional district 1911–1915	Succeeded by Peter E. Costello
