= William J. Green Jr. =

American politician (1910–1963)

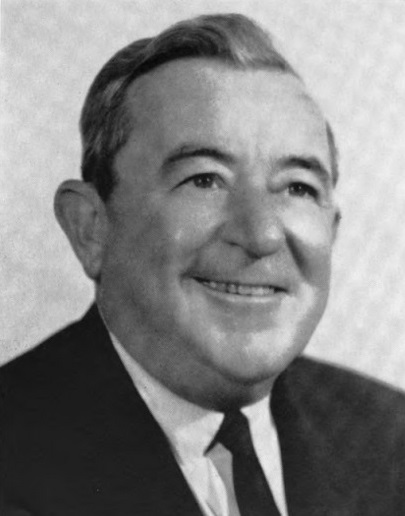

Member of the U.S. House of Representatives from Pennsylvania's 5th district
- In office January 3, 1949 – December 21, 1963
- Preceded by: George W. Sarbacher Jr.
- Succeeded by: William J. Green III
- In office January 3, 1945 – January 3, 1947
- Preceded by: C. Frederick Pracht
- Succeeded by: George W. Sarbacher Jr.

Personal details
- Born: March 5, 1910 Philadelphia, Pennsylvania, U.S.
- Died: December 21, 1963 (aged 53) Philadelphia, Pennsylvania, U.S.
- Resting place: Holy Sepulchre Cemetery, Cheltenham Township, Pennsylvania, U.S.
- Party: Democratic
- Spouse: Mary Kelly
- Children: 6, including William III
- Relatives: Bill Green IV (grandson)
- Education: St. Joseph's College

Military service
- Allegiance: United States
- Branch/service: United States Army
- Years of service: 1944
- Rank: Private

William Joseph Green Jr. (March 5, 1910 – December 21, 1963) was a Democratic member of the U.S. House of Representatives from Pennsylvania.

== Biography ==
William J. Green was born in Philadelphia, Pennsylvania, the son of Irish immigrants. He graduated from St. Joseph's Preparatory School, and attended St. Joseph's College in Philadelphia. He was engaged in business as an insurance broker in Philadelphia in 1937. He served in the United States Army as a private in the Quartermaster Corps, and after being elected to Congress in 1944 was discharged from the army.

After a defeat in the Republican landslide year of 1946, he was reelected to Congress in 1948 and every two years thereafter until his death at age 53. He was elected ward leader of the 33rd ward in the early 1940s, and Democratic City Chairman in 1953, a role he used to help solidify Philadelphia as a Democratic stronghold.

Green died of peritonitis and gall bladder complications in Philadelphia on December 21, 1963 and was interred at Holy Sepulchre Cemetery in Cheltenham Township, Pennsylvania. He was succeeded in Congress by his son, William J. Green III, who was 25 years old at the time of his first election, and later became Mayor of Philadelphia.

The William J. Green Jr. Federal Building, at 6th and Arch streets in Philadelphia, is named for him.

== See also ==
- List of members of the United States Congress who died in office (1950–1999)

U.S. House of Representatives
Preceded by Fred Pracht	Member of the U.S. House of Representatives from Pennsylvania's 5th congressional district 1945–1947	Succeeded by George Sarbacher
Preceded by George Sarbacher	Member of the U.S. House of Representatives from Pennsylvania's 5th congressional district 1949–1963	Succeeded by Bill Green, III
Party political offices
Preceded by James Finnegan	Chairman of the Philadelphia Democratic City Committee; 1953–1963	Succeeded by Frank Smith
