= James J. Connolly =

American politician

James Joseph Connolly
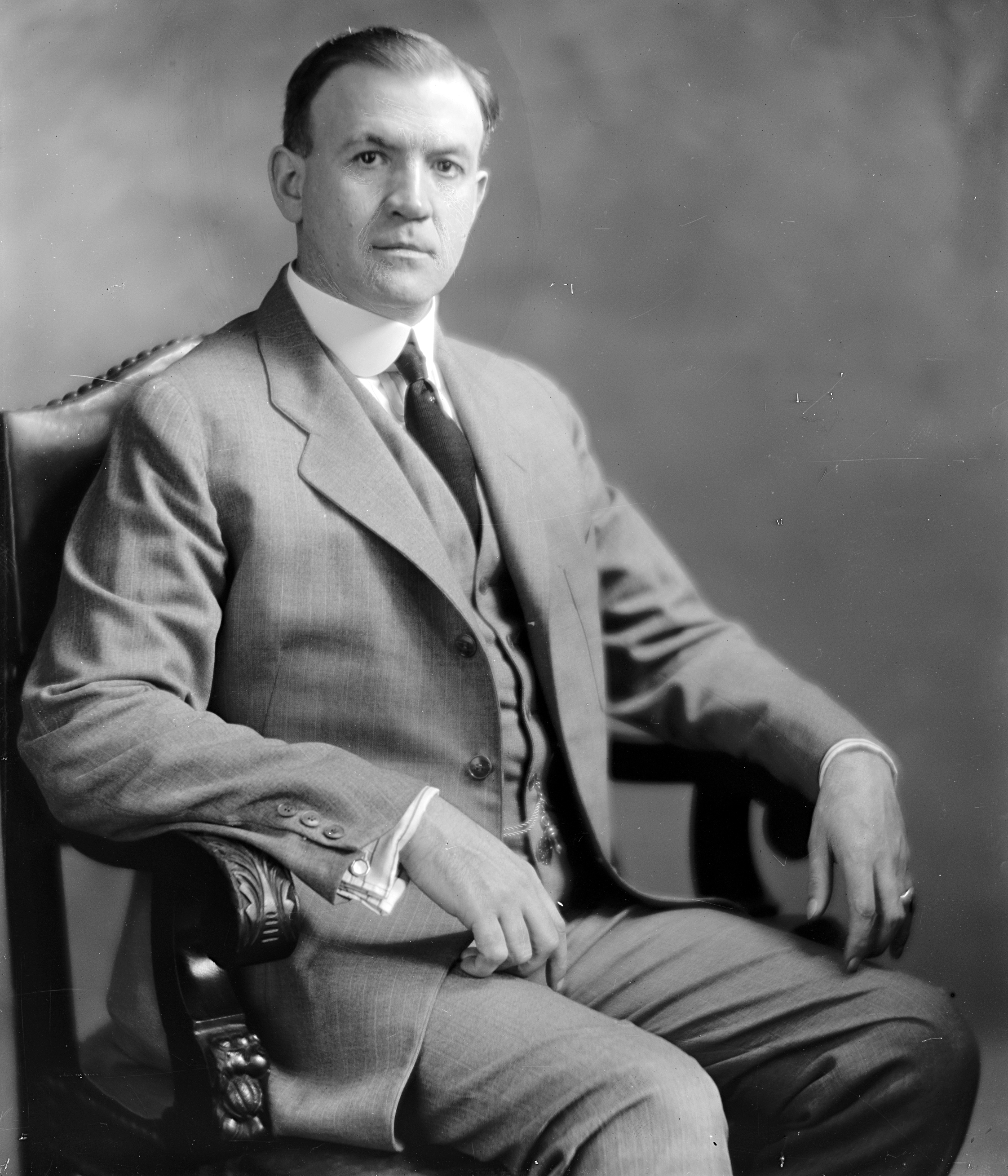

Member of the U.S. House of Representatives from Pennsylvania's 5th district
- In office March 4, 1921 – January 3, 1935
- Preceded by: Peter E. Costello
- Succeeded by: Frank J.G. Dorsey

Personal details
- Born: September 24, 1881 Philadelphia, Pennsylvania, U.S.
- Died: December 10, 1952 (aged 71)
- Resting place: Holy Sepulchre Cemetery, Cheltenham Township, Pennsylvania, U.S.
- Party: Republican

James Joseph Connolly (September 24, 1881 – December 10, 1952) was a Republican member of the United States House of Representatives for Pennsylvania.

James Connolly was born in Philadelphia, Pennsylvania. He was a member of the Republican State committee, and served as financial secretary of the Republican city committee of Philadelphia.

He was elected in 1920 as a Republican to the 67th and to the six succeeding Congresses. He was an unsuccessful candidate for reelection in 1934 and 1936. After his term in Congress, he was engaged in the real-estate business, and Vice President of Philadelphia Transportation Co. and Transit Investment Corporation.

He died on December 10, 1952, and was interred at Holy Sepulchre Cemetery in Cheltenham Township, Pennsylvania.

U.S. House of Representatives
Preceded by Peter E. Costello	Member of the U.S. House of Representatives from Pennsylvania's 5th congressional district 1921–1935	Succeeded by Frank J.G. Dorsey
