= David Fullerton =

American politician (1772–1843)

Member of the U.S. House of Representatives from Pennsylvania's 5th district
- In office March 4, 1819 – May 15, 1820
- Preceded by: See below
- Succeeded by: See below

Member of the Pennsylvania Senate from the 15th district
- In office 1827–1838
- Preceded by: James Dunlop
- Succeeded by: Samuel M. Barclay

Member of the Pennsylvania Senate from the 14th district
- In office 1839–1840
- Preceded by: Jacob Cassat
- Succeeded by: Thomas C. Miller

Personal details
- Born: October 4, 1772 Cumberland Valley, Province of Pennsylvania, British America
- Died: February 1, 1843 (aged 70) Greencastle, Pennsylvania, U.S.
- Party: Democratic-Republican

David Fullerton (October 4, 1772 – February 1, 1843) was an American politician from Pennsylvania who served as a Democratic-Republican member of the U.S. House of Representatives for Pennsylvania's 5th congressional district from 1819 to 1820.

== Biography ==
David Fullerton was born in the Cumberland Valley of the Province of Pennsylvania, near Greencastle to Humphrey and Martha (Mitchell) Fullerton. He is the uncle of David Fullerton Robison, the U.S. Congressman from Pennsylvania. He served in the War of 1812 with the rank of Major. He settled in Greencastle and engaged in mercantile pursuits and banking. He owned slaves as well.

Fullerton was elected as a Democratic-Republican to the Sixteenth Congress and served until his resignation on May 15, 1820. He was not a candidate for renomination. He resumed mercantile pursuits and banking.

He served as an Anti-Masonic member of the Pennsylvania State Senate for the 15th district from 1827 to 1838 and the 14th district from 1839 to 1840. He died in Greencastle in 1843.

== Sources ==
- United States Congress. "David Fullerton (id: F000416)". Biographical Directory of the United States Congress.
- The Political Graveyard

U.S. House of Representatives
Preceded by William Maclay; Andrew Boden	Member of the U.S. House of Representatives from Pennsylvania's 5th congressional district 1819–1820 alongside: Andrew Boden	Succeeded by Thomas Grubb McCullough; Andrew Boden
Pennsylvania State Senate
Preceded by James Dunlop	Member of the Pennsylvania Senate, 15th district 1827-1838	Succeeded by Samuel M. Barclay
Preceded by Jacob Cassat	Member of the Pennsylvania Senate, 14th district 1839-1840	Succeeded by Thomas C. Miller
