= Edward de Veaux Morrell =

American politician

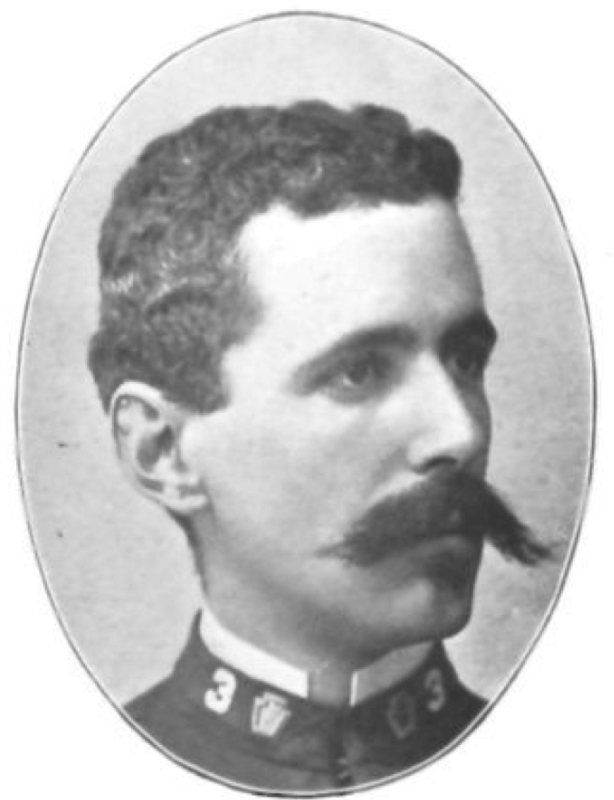

Member of the U.S. House of Representatives from Pennsylvania's 5th district
- In office November 6, 1900 – March 3, 1907
- Preceded by: Alfred C. Harmer
- Succeeded by: William W. Foulkrod

Personal details
- Born: August 7, 1863 Newport, Rhode Island, U.S.
- Died: September 1, 1917 (aged 54) Colorado Springs, Colorado, U.S.
- Party: Republican
- Spouse: Louise Bouvier Drexel (m. 1889)
- Education: University of Pennsylvania; University of Pennsylvania Law School

Edward de Veaux Morrell (August 7, 1863 – September 1, 1917) was a Republican member of the U.S. House of Representatives from Pennsylvania.

== Early life ==
Morrell was born in Newport, Rhode Island on August 7, 1863. He was the son of Edward Morrell and Ida Alicia (née Powel) Morrell.

He attended private schools and graduated from the University of Pennsylvania, where he was a member of St. Anthony Hall, in 1885. He studied law at the University of Pennsylvania Law School, was admitted to the bar in 1887 and commenced practice in Philadelphia. He was a member of the select council of Philadelphia from 1891 to 1894. He was active in the Pennsylvania National Guard, serving as a colonel of the Third Regiment and brigadier general commanding the First Brigade.

== Career ==
Morrell was elected as a Republican to the Fifty-sixth Congress to fill the vacancy caused by the death of Alfred C. Harmer. He was reelected to the Fifty-seventh, Fifty-eighth, and Fifty-ninth Congresses. He served as chairman of the House United States House Committee on the Militia during the Fifty-eighth and Fifty-ninth Congresses. In 1904, he delivered a speech defending the Fourteenth and Fifteenth Amendment from Democrats' polemics against it. He was not a candidate for renomination in 1906.

He established the first telephone line north of the Frankford section of Philadelphia, and built an electric-light plant there. He was a member of the board of education of Philadelphia from 1912 to 1916.

== Personal life ==
In 1889, he was married to Louise Bouvier Drexel (1863 –1945), daughter of Francis Anthony Drexel and niece of Anthony J. Drexel, the most influential financier in the U.S. in the nineteenth century. Louise's mother, Emma Bouvier, was the aunt of John Vernou Bouvier, Jr., U.S. First Lady Jacqueline Kennedy Onassis's paternal grandfather. Louise's half-sister was canonized as Saint Katharine Drexel on October 1, 2000 by Pope John Paul II.

He was a resident of the Torresdale section of Philadelphia. He later went to Colorado Springs, Colorado, for his health, and died there in 1917. He was interred in the family crypt at Eden Hall in Torresdale. The North East Philadelphia neighborhood of Morrell Park next to Torresdale where he resided is named after him and is the former site of the Morrell's summer estate.

U.S. House of Representatives
Preceded by Alfred C. Harmer	Member of the U.S. House of Representatives from Pennsylvania's 5th congressional district 1900–1907	Succeeded by William W. Foulkrod
