= Pennsylvania's 5th congressional district =

U.S. House district for Pennsylvania

Coordinates: 41°23′14″N 78°34′14″W

- Interactive map of district boundaries since January 3, 2023 (Delaware County outlined in red)
- Representative: Mary Gay Scanlon; D–Swarthmore
- Population (2025): 772,787
- Median household income: $92,258
- Ethnicity: 58.1% White; 24.4% Black; 7.1% Asian; 6.3% Hispanic; 3.5% Two or more races; 0.6% other
- Cook PVI: D+15

Pennsylvania's fifth congressional district encompasses all of Delaware County, an exclave of Chester County, a small portion of southern Montgomery County and a section of southern Philadelphia. Democrat Mary Gay Scanlon represents the district.

Prior to 2018, the fifth district was located in north-central Pennsylvania and was the largest in area, and therefore least densely populated, of all of Pennsylvania's congressional districts. It was Republican-leaning and represented by Glenn Thompson (R). However, in February 2018, the Supreme Court of Pennsylvania redrew this district after ruling the previous congressional district map unconstitutional due to partisan gerrymandering, assigning its number to a more left-leaning district in southeastern Pennsylvania for the 2018 elections and representation thereafter–essentially, a successor to the old seventh district. Most of Thompson's territory became a new, heavily Republican 15th district. He was re-elected there.

The 5th district is mostly suburban, but contains some urban and rural areas as well. The entirety of Delaware County and the majority of both the Main Line Suburbs and South Philadelphia are part of this district. The district is fairly diverse compared to others in Pennsylvania, and is roughly 25% African American.

== Recent election results from statewide races ==
Year	Office	Results
2008	President	Obama 63–36%
2008	Attorney General	Morganelli 54–46%
2008	Auditor General	Wagner 62–38%
2010	Senate	Sestak 60–40%
2010	Governor	Onorato 57–43%
2012	President	Obama 64–36%
2012	Senate	Casey Jr. 65–35%
2014	Governor	Wolf 64–36%
2016	President	Clinton 63–34%
2016	Senate	McGinty 59–39%
2016	Attorney General	Shapiro 62–38%
2016	Auditor General	DePasquale 59–38%
2016	Treasurer	Torsella 61–36%
2018	Senate	Casey Jr. 68–31%
2018	Governor	Wolf 70–29%
2020	President	Biden 66–33%
2020	Attorney General	Shapiro 64–34%
2020	Auditor General	Ahmad 60–36%
2020	Treasurer	Torsella 62–36%
2022	Senate	Fetterman 65–32%
2022	Governor	Shapiro 70–28%
2024	President	Harris 64–35%
2024	Senate	Casey Jr. 63–35%
2024	Attorney General	DePasquale 59–38%
2024	Auditor General	Kenyatta 60–37%
2024	Treasurer	McClelland 60–38%

== Composition ==
Chester County (0)

Unincorporated area in Chester County

Delaware County (50)

All 49 municipalities

Montgomery County (5)

Bridgeport, Lower Merion Township (part; also 4th; includes Penn Wynne and part of Ardmore, Bryn Mawr, Haverford College, Merion Station, Rosemont, and Villanova), Narberth, Norristown, Upper Merion Township (part; also 4th; includes Swedeland and part of King of Prussia)

Philadelphia County (1)

Philadelphia (part; also 2nd and 3rd)

Philadelphia neighborhoods in the 5th district include:

- Clearview
- Eastwick
- Elmwood Park
- Girard Estate
- Melrose
- Mount Moriah
- Packer Park
- South Philadelphia East
- Southwest Philadelphia

== List of members representing the district ==
District created in 1791 from the at-large district.

=== 1791–1793: one seat ===
Representative	Party	Years	Cong ress	Electoral history
District first established March 4, 1791
John W. Kittera (Lancaster)	Pro-Administration	March 4, 1791 – March 3, 1793	2nd	Elected in 1791. Redistricted to the at-large district.

District redistricted in 1793 to the at-large district.

=== 1795–1813: one seat ===
District restored in 1795.

Representative	Party	Years	Cong ress	Electoral history
Daniel Hiester (West Chester)	Democratic-Republican	March 4, 1795 – July 1, 1796	4th	Redistricted from the at-large district and re-elected in 1794. Resigned.
Vacant		July 1, 1796 – December 8, 1796	4th	
George Ege (Womelsdorf)	Federalist	December 8, 1796 – March 3, 1797	4th	Elected October 10, 1797, to finish Hiester's term. Also elected the next day to the next term. Resigned.
George Ege (Womelsdorf)	Federalist	March 4, 1797 – October ??, 1797	5th	Elected October 10, 1797, to finish Hiester's term. Also elected the next day to the next term. Resigned.
Vacant		October ??, 1797 – December 1, 1797	5th	
Joseph Hiester (Reading)	Democratic-Republican	December 1, 1797 – March 3, 1799	5th	Elected to finish Ege's term. Re-elected in 1798. Re-elected in 1800. Redistricted to the 3rd district.
Joseph Hiester (Reading)	Democratic-Republican	March 4, 1799 – March 3, 1803	6th 7th	Elected to finish Ege's term. Re-elected in 1798. Re-elected in 1800. Redistricted to the 3rd district.
Andrew Gregg (Bellefonte)	Democratic-Republican	March 4, 1803 – March 3, 1807	8th 9th	Redistricted from the 9th district and re-elected in 1802. Re-elected in 1804. Lost re-election.
Daniel Montgomery Jr. (Danville)	Democratic-Republican	March 4, 1807 – March 3, 1809	10th	Elected in 1806. Retired.
George Smith	Democratic-Republican	March 4, 1809 – March 3, 1813	11th 12th	Re-elected in 1808. Re-elected in 1810. Redistricted to the 10th district and lost re-election.

=== 1813–1823: two seats ===
Years	Cong ress	Seat A			Seat B		
Years	Cong ress	Representative	Party	Electoral history	Representative	Party	Electoral history
March 4, 1813 – April 8, 1813	13th	William Crawford (Gettysburg)	Democratic-Republican	Redistricted from the 6th district and re-elected in 1812. Re-elected in 1814. Lost re-election.	Robert Whitehill (Camp Hill)	Democratic-Republican	Redistricted from the 4th district and re-elected in 1812. Died.
April 8, 1813 – May 11, 1813	13th	William Crawford (Gettysburg)	Democratic-Republican	Redistricted from the 6th district and re-elected in 1812. Re-elected in 1814. Lost re-election.	Vacant		
May 11, 1813 – March 3, 1815	13th	William Crawford (Gettysburg)	Democratic-Republican	Redistricted from the 6th district and re-elected in 1812. Re-elected in 1814. Lost re-election.	John Rea (Chambersburg)	Democratic-Republican	Elected to finish Whitehill's term. Retired.
March 4, 1815 – March 3, 1817	14th	William Crawford (Gettysburg)	Democratic-Republican	Redistricted from the 6th district and re-elected in 1812. Re-elected in 1814. Lost re-election.	William Maclay (Fannettsburg)	Democratic-Republican	Elected in 1814. Re-elected in 1816. Retired.
March 4, 1817 – March 3, 1819	15th	Andrew Boden (Carlisle)	Democratic-Republican	Elected in 1816. Re-elected in 1818. Retired.	William Maclay (Fannettsburg)	Democratic-Republican	Elected in 1814. Re-elected in 1816. Retired.
March 4, 1819 – May 15, 1820	16th	Andrew Boden (Carlisle)	Democratic-Republican	Elected in 1816. Re-elected in 1818. Retired.	David Fullerton (Greencastle)	Democratic-Republican	Elected in 1818. Resigned.
May 15, 1820 – November 13, 1820	16th	Andrew Boden (Carlisle)	Democratic-Republican	Elected in 1816. Re-elected in 1818. Retired.	Vacant		
November 13, 1820 – March 3, 1821	16th	Andrew Boden (Carlisle)	Democratic-Republican	Elected in 1816. Re-elected in 1818. Retired.	Thomas Grubb McCullough (Chambersburg)	Federalist	Elected October 10, 1820, to finish Fullerton's term and seated November 13, 1820. Did not run in the same day's election to the next term.
March 4, 1821 – December 12, 1821	17th	Vacant		Representative-elect James Duncan resigned before assembly of Congress.	James McSherry (Petersburg)	Federalist	Elected in 1820. Redistricted to the 11th district and lost re-election.
December 12, 1821 – March 3, 1823	17th	John Findlay (Chambersburg)	Democratic-Republican	Elected October 9, 1821, to finish Duncan's term and seated December 12, 1821. Redistricted to the 11th district.	James McSherry (Petersburg)	Federalist	Elected in 1820. Redistricted to the 11th district and lost re-election.

=== 1823–present: one seat ===
Member	Party	Years	Cong ress	Electoral history	District location
Philip Swenk Markley (Norristown)	Jackson Democratic-Republican	March 4, 1823 – March 3, 1825	18th 19th	Elected in 1822. Re-elected in 1824. Lost re-election.	1823–1833 [data missing]
Philip Swenk Markley (Norristown)	Anti-Jacksonian	March 4, 1825 – March 3, 1827	18th 19th	Elected in 1822. Re-elected in 1824. Lost re-election.	1823–1833 [data missing]
John Benton Sterigere (Norristown)	Jacksonian	March 4, 1827 – March 3, 1831	20th 21st	Elected in 1826. Re-elected in 1828. Retired.	1823–1833 [data missing]
Joel Keith Mann (Jenkintown)	Jacksonian	March 4, 1831 – March 3, 1835	22nd 23rd	Elected in 1830. Re-elected in 1832. Retired.	1823–1833 [data missing]
Joel Keith Mann (Jenkintown)	Jacksonian	March 4, 1831 – March 3, 1835	22nd 23rd	Elected in 1830. Re-elected in 1832. Retired.	1833–1843 [data missing]
Jacob Fry Jr. (Trappe)	Jacksonian	March 4, 1835 – March 3, 1837	24th 25th	Elected in 1834. Re-elected in 1836. Retired.	1833–1843 [data missing]
Jacob Fry Jr. (Trappe)	Democratic	March 4, 1837 – March 3, 1839	24th 25th	Elected in 1834. Re-elected in 1836. Retired.	1833–1843 [data missing]
Joseph Fornance (Norristown)	Democratic	March 4, 1839 – March 3, 1843	26th 27th	Elected in 1838. Re-elected in 1840. [data missing]	1833–1843 [data missing]
Jacob Senewell Yost (Pottstown)	Democratic	March 4, 1843 – March 3, 1847	28th 29th	Elected in 1843. Re-elected in 1844. [data missing]	1843–1853 [data missing]
John Freedley (Norristown)	Whig	March 4, 1847 – March 3, 1851	30th 31st	Elected in 1846. Re-elected in 1848. [data missing]	1843–1853 [data missing]
John McNair (Norristown)	Democratic	March 4, 1851 – March 3, 1855	32nd 33rd	Elected in 1850. Re-elected in 1852. [data missing]	1843–1853 [data missing]
John McNair (Norristown)	Democratic	March 4, 1851 – March 3, 1855	32nd 33rd	Elected in 1850. Re-elected in 1852. [data missing]	1853–1863 [data missing]
John Cadwalader (Philadelphia)	Democratic	March 4, 1855 – March 3, 1857	34th	Elected in 1854. [data missing]	1853–1863 [data missing]
Owen Jones (Philadelphia)	Democratic	March 4, 1857 – March 3, 1859	35th	Elected in 1856. Lost re-election.	1853–1863 [data missing]
John Wood (Conshohocken)	Republican	March 4, 1859 – March 3, 1861	36th	Elected in 1858. Retired.	1853–1863 [data missing]
William M. Davis (Milestown)	Republican	March 4, 1861 – March 3, 1863	37th	Elected in 1860. [data missing]	1853–1863 [data missing]
Martin Russell Thayer (Philadelphia)	Republican	March 4, 1863 – March 3, 1867	38th 39th	Elected in 1862. Re-elected in 1864. Declined to be a candidate for renomination.	1863–1869 [data missing]
Caleb Newbold Taylor (Bristol)	Republican	March 4, 1867 – March 3, 1869	40th	Elected in 1866. [data missing]	1863–1869 [data missing]
John Roberts Reading (Philadelphia)	Democratic	March 4, 1869 – April 13, 1870	41st	Lost contested election.	1869–1873 [data missing]
Caleb Newbold Taylor (Bristol)	Republican	April 13, 1870 – March 3, 1871	41st	Won contested election. [data missing]	1869–1873 [data missing]
Alfred C. Harmer (Philadelphia)	Republican	March 4, 1871 – March 3, 1875	42nd 43rd	Elected in 1870. Re-elected in 1872. Lost re-election.	1869–1873 [data missing]
Alfred C. Harmer (Philadelphia)	Republican	March 4, 1871 – March 3, 1875	42nd 43rd	Elected in 1870. Re-elected in 1872. Lost re-election.	1873–1875 [data missing]
John Robbins (Philadelphia)	Democratic	March 4, 1875 – March 3, 1877	44th	Elected in 1874. Declined to be a candidate for re-election.	1875–1883 [data missing]
Alfred C. Harmer (Philadelphia)	Republican	March 4, 1877 – March 6, 1900	45th 46th 47th 48th 49th 50th 51st 52nd 53rd 54th 55th 56th	Elected in 1876. Re-elected in 1878. Re-elected in 1880. Re-elected in 1882. Re-elected in 1884. Re-elected in 1886. Re-elected in 1888. Re-elected in 1890. Re-elected in 1892. Re-elected in 1894. Re-elected in 1896. Re-elected in 1898. Died.	1875–1883 [data missing]
Alfred C. Harmer (Philadelphia)	Republican	March 4, 1877 – March 6, 1900	45th 46th 47th 48th 49th 50th 51st 52nd 53rd 54th 55th 56th	Elected in 1876. Re-elected in 1878. Re-elected in 1880. Re-elected in 1882. Re-elected in 1884. Re-elected in 1886. Re-elected in 1888. Re-elected in 1890. Re-elected in 1892. Re-elected in 1894. Re-elected in 1896. Re-elected in 1898. Died.	1883–1889 [data missing]
Alfred C. Harmer (Philadelphia)	Republican	March 4, 1877 – March 6, 1900	45th 46th 47th 48th 49th 50th 51st 52nd 53rd 54th 55th 56th	Elected in 1876. Re-elected in 1878. Re-elected in 1880. Re-elected in 1882. Re-elected in 1884. Re-elected in 1886. Re-elected in 1888. Re-elected in 1890. Re-elected in 1892. Re-elected in 1894. Re-elected in 1896. Re-elected in 1898. Died.	1889–1893 [data missing]
Alfred C. Harmer (Philadelphia)	Republican	March 4, 1877 – March 6, 1900	45th 46th 47th 48th 49th 50th 51st 52nd 53rd 54th 55th 56th	Elected in 1876. Re-elected in 1878. Re-elected in 1880. Re-elected in 1882. Re-elected in 1884. Re-elected in 1886. Re-elected in 1888. Re-elected in 1890. Re-elected in 1892. Re-elected in 1894. Re-elected in 1896. Re-elected in 1898. Died.	1893–1903 [data missing]
Vacant		March 6, 1900 – November 6, 1900	56th		1893–1903 [data missing]
Edward de Veaux Morrell (Philadelphia)	Republican	November 6, 1900 – March 3, 1907	56th 57th 58th 59th	Elected in 1900. Re-elected in 1902. Re-elected in 1904. Retired.	1893–1903 [data missing]
Edward de Veaux Morrell (Philadelphia)	Republican	November 6, 1900 – March 3, 1907	56th 57th 58th 59th	Elected in 1900. Re-elected in 1902. Re-elected in 1904. Retired.	1903–1913 [data missing]
William Walker Foulkrod (Philadelphia)	Republican	March 4, 1907 – November 13, 1910	60th 61st	Elected in 1906. Re-elected in 1908. Died.	1903–1913 [data missing]
Vacant		November 13, 1910 – March 3, 1911	61st		1903–1913 [data missing]
Michael Donohoe (Philadelphia)	Democratic	March 4, 1911 – March 3, 1915	62nd 63rd	Elected in 1910. Re-elected in 1912. Lost re-election.	1903–1913 [data missing]
Michael Donohoe (Philadelphia)	Democratic	March 4, 1911 – March 3, 1915	62nd 63rd	Elected in 1910. Re-elected in 1912. Lost re-election.	1913–1923
Peter E. Costello (Philadelphia)	Republican	March 4, 1915 – March 3, 1921	64th 65th 66th	Elected in 1914. Re-elected in 1916. Re-elected in 1918. Lost re-election.	1913–1923
James J. Connolly (Philadelphia)	Republican	March 4, 1921 – January 3, 1935	67th 68th 69th 70th 71st 72nd 73rd	Elected in 1920. Re-elected in 1922. Re-elected in 1924. Re-elected in 1926. Re-elected in 1928. Re-elected in 1930. Re-elected in 1932. Lost re-election.	1913–1923
James J. Connolly (Philadelphia)	Republican	March 4, 1921 – January 3, 1935	67th 68th 69th 70th 71st 72nd 73rd	Elected in 1920. Re-elected in 1922. Re-elected in 1924. Re-elected in 1926. Re-elected in 1928. Re-elected in 1930. Re-elected in 1932. Lost re-election.	1923–1933
James J. Connolly (Philadelphia)	Republican	March 4, 1921 – January 3, 1935	67th 68th 69th 70th 71st 72nd 73rd	Elected in 1920. Re-elected in 1922. Re-elected in 1924. Re-elected in 1926. Re-elected in 1928. Re-elected in 1930. Re-elected in 1932. Lost re-election.	1933–1943
Frank J. G. Dorsey (Philadelphia)	Democratic	January 3, 1935 – January 3, 1939	74th 75th	Elected in 1934. Re-elected in 1936. Lost re-election.	1933–1943
Fred C. Gartner (Philadelphia)	Republican	January 3, 1939 – January 3, 1941	76th	Elected in 1938. Lost re-election.	1933–1943
Francis R. Smith (Philadelphia)	Democratic	January 3, 1941 – January 3, 1943	77th	Elected in 1940. Lost re-election.	1933–1943
C. Frederick Pracht (Philadelphia)	Republican	January 3, 1943 – January 3, 1945	78th	Elected in 1942. Lost re-election.	1943–1945
William J. Green Jr. (Philadelphia)	Democratic	January 3, 1945 – January 3, 1947	79th	Elected in 1944. Lost re-election.	1945–1953
George W. Sarbacher Jr. (Philadelphia)	Republican	January 3, 1947 – January 3, 1949	80th	Elected in 1946. Lost re-election.	1945–1953
William J. Green Jr. (Philadelphia)	Democratic	January 3, 1949 – December 21, 1963	81st 82nd 83rd 84th 85th 86th 87th 88th	Elected in 1948. Re-elected in 1950. Re-elected in 1952. Re-elected in 1954. Re-elected in 1956. Re-elected in 1958. Re-elected in 1960. Re-elected in 1962. Died.	1945–1953
William J. Green Jr. (Philadelphia)	Democratic	January 3, 1949 – December 21, 1963	81st 82nd 83rd 84th 85th 86th 87th 88th	Elected in 1948. Re-elected in 1950. Re-elected in 1952. Re-elected in 1954. Re-elected in 1956. Re-elected in 1958. Re-elected in 1960. Re-elected in 1962. Died.	1953–1963
William J. Green Jr. (Philadelphia)	Democratic	January 3, 1949 – December 21, 1963	81st 82nd 83rd 84th 85th 86th 87th 88th	Elected in 1948. Re-elected in 1950. Re-elected in 1952. Re-elected in 1954. Re-elected in 1956. Re-elected in 1958. Re-elected in 1960. Re-elected in 1962. Died.	1963–1973
Vacant		December 21, 1963 – April 28, 1964	88th		1963–1973
William J. Green III (Philadelphia)	Democratic	April 28, 1964 – January 3, 1973	88th 89th 90th 91st 92nd	Elected to finish his father's term. Re-elected in 1964. Re-elected in 1966. Re-elected in 1968. Re-elected in 1970. Redistricted to the 3rd district.	1963–1973
John H. Ware III (Oxford)	Republican	January 3, 1973 – January 3, 1975	93rd	Redistricted from the 9th district and re-elected in 1972. Retired.	1973–1983
Dick Schulze (Berwyn)	Republican	January 3, 1975 – January 3, 1993	94th 95th 96th 97th 98th 99th 100th 101st 102nd	Elected in 1974. Re-elected in 1976. Re-elected in 1978. Re-elected in 1980. Re-elected in 1982. Re-elected in 1984. Re-elected in 1986. Re-elected in 1988. Re-elected in 1990. Retired.	1973–1983
Dick Schulze (Berwyn)	Republican	January 3, 1975 – January 3, 1993	94th 95th 96th 97th 98th 99th 100th 101st 102nd	Elected in 1974. Re-elected in 1976. Re-elected in 1978. Re-elected in 1980. Re-elected in 1982. Re-elected in 1984. Re-elected in 1986. Re-elected in 1988. Re-elected in 1990. Retired.	1983–1989
Dick Schulze (Berwyn)	Republican	January 3, 1975 – January 3, 1993	94th 95th 96th 97th 98th 99th 100th 101st 102nd	Elected in 1974. Re-elected in 1976. Re-elected in 1978. Re-elected in 1980. Re-elected in 1982. Re-elected in 1984. Re-elected in 1986. Re-elected in 1988. Re-elected in 1990. Retired.	1989–1993
William Clinger (Warren)	Republican	January 3, 1993 – January 3, 1997	103rd 104th	Redistricted from the 23rd district and re-elected in 1992. Re-elected in 1994. Retired.	1993–2003
John E. Peterson (Pleasantville)	Republican	January 3, 1997 – January 3, 2009	105th 106th 107th 108th 109th 110th	Elected in 1996. Re-elected in 1998. Re-elected in 2000. Re-elected in 2002. Re-elected in 2004. Re-elected in 2006. Retired.	1993–2003
John E. Peterson (Pleasantville)	Republican	January 3, 1997 – January 3, 2009	105th 106th 107th 108th 109th 110th	Elected in 1996. Re-elected in 1998. Re-elected in 2000. Re-elected in 2002. Re-elected in 2004. Re-elected in 2006. Retired.	2003–2013
Glenn Thompson (Howard)	Republican	January 3, 2009 – January 3, 2019	111th 112th 113th 114th 115th	Elected in 2008. Re-elected in 2010. Re-elected in 2012. Re-elected in 2014. Re-elected in 2016. Redistricted to the 15th district.	2003–2013
Glenn Thompson (Howard)	Republican	January 3, 2009 – January 3, 2019	111th 112th 113th 114th 115th	Elected in 2008. Re-elected in 2010. Re-elected in 2012. Re-elected in 2014. Re-elected in 2016. Redistricted to the 15th district.	2013–2019
Mary Gay Scanlon (Swarthmore)	Democratic	January 3, 2019 – present	116th 117th 118th 119th	Redistricted from the 7th district and elected to full term in 2018. Re-elected in 2020. Re-elected in 2022. Re-elected in 2024. Re-elected in 2026.	2019–2023
Mary Gay Scanlon (Swarthmore)	Democratic	January 3, 2019 – present	116th 117th 118th 119th	Redistricted from the 7th district and elected to full term in 2018. Re-elected in 2020. Re-elected in 2022. Re-elected in 2024. Re-elected in 2026.	2023–present

== Recent election results ==
2000 election
Party	Candidate	Votes	%
Republican	John E. Peterson (incumbent)	147,570	82.7%
Libertarian	Thomas A. Martin	17,020	9.5%
Green	William M. Belitskus	13,875	7.8%
Total votes		178,465	100%
Republican hold			

2002 election
Party	Candidate	Votes	%
Republican	John E. Peterson (incumbent)	124,942	87.4%
Libertarian	Thomas A. Martin	18,078	12.6%
Total votes		143,020	100%
Republican hold			

2004 election
Party	Candidate	Votes	%
Republican	John E. Peterson (incumbent)	192,852	88.0%
Libertarian	Thomas A. Martin	26,239	12.0%
Total votes		219,091	100%
Republican hold			

2006 election
Party	Candidate	Votes	%
Republican	John E. Peterson (incumbent)	115,126	60.1%
Democratic	Donald L. Hilliard	76,456	39.9%
Total votes		191,582	100%
Republican hold			

2008 election
Party	Candidate	Votes	%
Republican	Glenn Thompson	155,513	56.7%
Democratic	Mark B. McCracken	112,509	41.0%
Libertarian	James Fryman	6,155	2.2%
Total votes		274,177	99.9%
Republican hold			

2010 election
Party	Candidate	Votes	%
Republican	Glenn Thompson (incumbent)	125,740	68.6%
Democratic	Michael Pipe	51,848	28.3%
Libertarian	Vernon L. Etzel	5,654	3.1%
Total votes		182,972	100%
Republican hold			

2012 election
Party	Candidate	Votes	%
Republican	Glenn Thompson (incumbent)	177,704	62.9%
Democratic	Charles Dumas	104,710	37.1%
Total votes		282,414	100%
Republican hold			

2014 election
Party	Candidate	Votes	%
Republican	Glenn Thompson (Incumbent)	115,018	63.60%
Democratic	Kerith Strano Taylor	65,839	36.40%
Total votes		180,857	100%
Republican hold			

2016 election
Party	Candidate	Votes	%
Republican	Glenn Thompson (Incumbent)	206,761	67.16%
Democratic	Kerith Strano Taylor	101,082	32.84%
Total votes		307,843	100%
Republican hold			

2018 election
Party	Candidate	Votes	%
Democratic	Mary Gay Scanlon	198,639	65.2%
Republican	Pearl Kim	106,075	34.8%
Total votes		304,714	100%
Democratic gain from Republican			

2020 election
Party	Candidate	Votes	%
Democratic	Mary Gay Scanlon (incumbent)	255,743	64.7
Republican	Dasha Pruett	139,552	35.3
Total votes		395,295	100.0
Democratic hold			

2022 election
Party	Candidate	Votes	%
Democratic	Mary Gay Scanlon (incumbent)	205,128	65.1
Republican	David Galluch	110,058	34.9
Total votes		315,186	100.0
Democratic hold			

2024 election
Party	Candidate	Votes	%
Democratic	Mary Gay Scanlon (incumbent)	267,754	65.3
Republican	Alfeia DeVaughn-Goodwin	142,355	34.7
Total votes		410,109	100.0
Democratic hold			

== See also ==
- List of United States congressional districts
- Pennsylvania's congressional districts
