= Frank J. G. Dorsey =

American politician

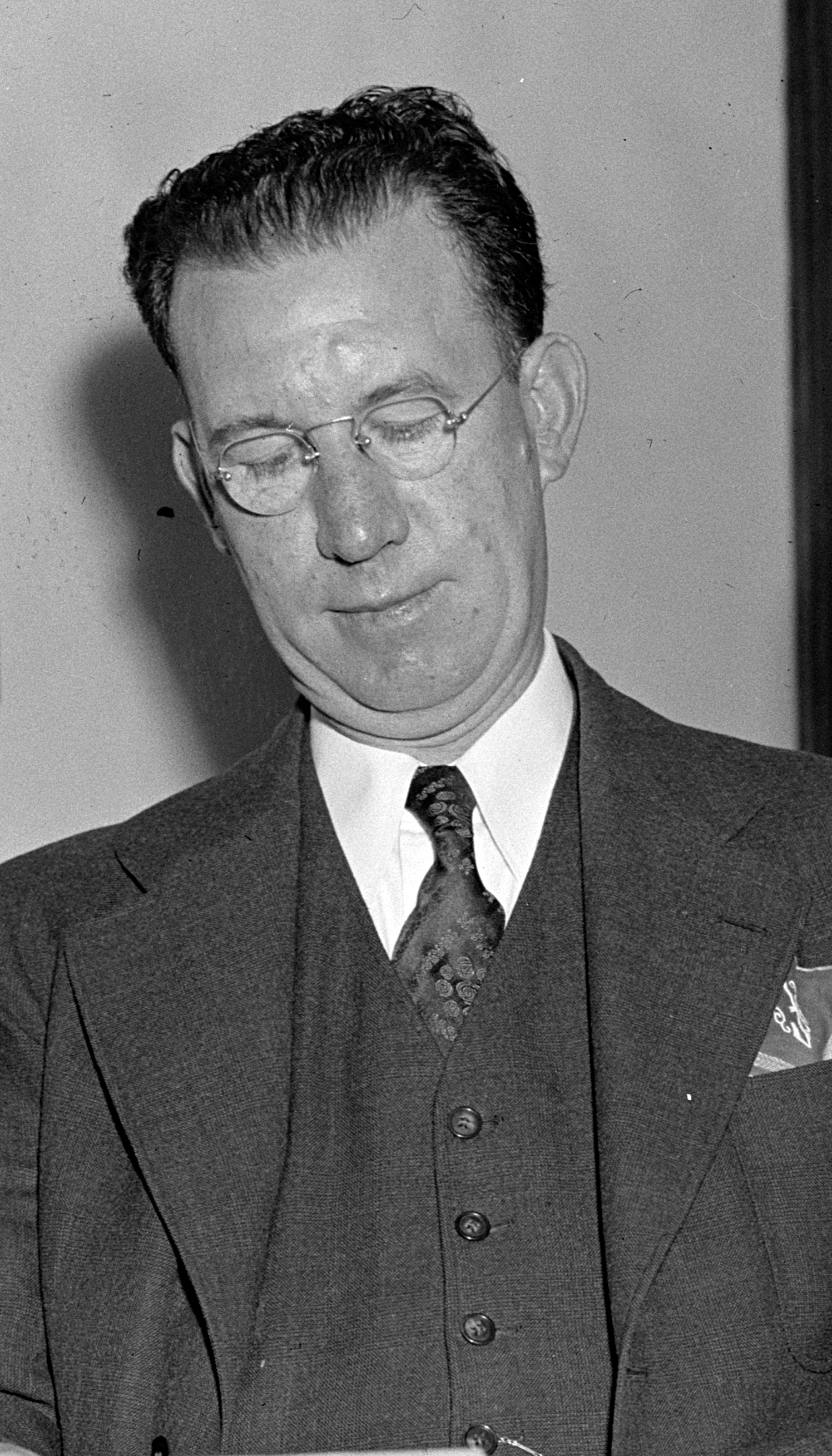

Member of the U.S. House of Representatives from Pennsylvania's 5th district
- In office January 3, 1935 – January 3, 1939
- Preceded by: James J. Connolly
- Succeeded by: Fred C. Gartner

Personal details
- Born: April 26, 1891 Philadelphia, Pennsylvania
- Died: July 13, 1949 (aged 58) Philadelphia, Pennsylvania
- Party: Democratic
- Education: University of Pennsylvania

Frank Joseph Gerard Dorsey (April 26, 1891 – July 13, 1949) was a member of the United States House of Representatives from Pennsylvania.

== Biography ==
He was born in Philadelphia, Pennsylvania, April 26, 1891; attended grade and high schools; was graduated from the University of Pennsylvania at Philadelphia in 1917; served on the faculty of the University of Pennsylvania in 1916 and 1917; enlisted as a private in the Ordnance Department, United States Army, in July 1917 and was honorably discharged as a lieutenant on April 18, 1919; engaged in the manufacture of steel tools in 1919; also engaged in banking; elected as a Democrat to the Seventy-fourth and Seventy-fifth Congresses (January 3, 1935 – January 3, 1939); unsuccessful candidate for reelection in 1938 to the Seventy-sixth Congress; member of the United States Sesquicentennial Constitution Commission in 1938; director, Region III, Wage and Hours and Public Contracts Division, United States Department of Labor, from 1939 until his death in Philadelphia, Pennsylvania, July 13, 1949; interment in St. Dominic's Cemetery.

U.S. House of Representatives
Preceded by James J. Connolly	Member of the U.S. House of Representatives from Pennsylvania's 5th congressional district 1935–1939	Succeeded by Fred C. Gartner
