= William Maclay (Pennsylvania politician, born 1765) =

American politician

William Maclay (March 22, 1765 – January 4, 1825) was an early-American lawyer who served two terms as a member of the United States House of Representatives from Pennsylvania from 1815 to 1819.

== Biography ==
Maclay was born in Lurgan Township, Pennsylvania. He attended the country schools, studied law, was admitted to the bar in 1800 and commenced the practice of his profession at Chambersburg, Pennsylvania. He was county commissioner of Franklin County, Pennsylvania, in 1805 and 1806.

=== Political career ===
He was a member of the Pennsylvania House of Representatives in 1807 and 1808, and served as associate judge for the Cumberland district in 1809.

Maclay was elected as a Republican to the Fourteenth and Fifteenth Congresses, serving from 1815 to 1819.

=== Death and burial ===
He died in Lurgan in 1825 and was interred in Middle Springs Cemetery.

== Sources ==
- United States Congress. "William Maclay (id: M000030)". Biographical Directory of the United States Congress.
- The Political Graveyard

U.S. House of Representatives
Preceded by William Crawford; John Rea	Member of the U.S. House of Representatives from Pennsylvania's 5th congressional district 1815–1819; 1817–1819 alongside: Andrew Boden	Succeeded by Andrew Boden; David Fullerton
