= George W. Sarbacher Jr. =

American politician

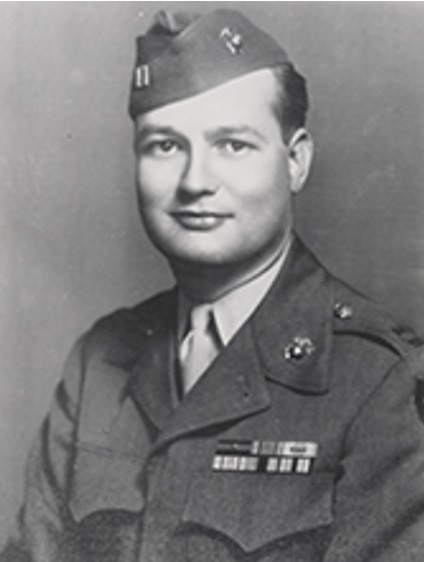
Sarbacher as a U.S. Marine Corps captain, circa 1947

George William Sarbacher Jr. (September 30, 1919 – March 4, 1973) was a Republican member of the U.S. House of Representatives from Pennsylvania.

== Formative years ==
Born in Philadelphia, Pennsylvania on September 30, 1919, Sarbacher graduated from Temple University in 1942. He then enlisted in the United States Marine Corps and served from January 1942 to January 1947. Commissioned a lieutenant and later a captain, he served overseas in the Southwest Pacific for two and a half years.

== Public service career ==
While serving on active duty in the Marines, Sarbacher ran for a seat in the United States Congress. He was elected in 1946 as a Republican to the 80th Congress, but was an unsuccessful candidate for reelection in 1948 and 1950. Sarbacher was the choice of the party organization in 1946; his father was a veteran Republican leader in the 43rd ward. The son was only 26 but had spent the previous five years with the Marines, which did not hurt his electability. He was nominated over a former member of the House by a 3:1 margin. Sarbacher's Democratic opponent was finishing his first term. Republicans took six Democratic House seats in Philadelphia in 1946, and Sarbacher was swept in. In 1948 four of the six Republican Philadelphians were swept out, including Sarbacher, though his loss was by only one point. This was incentive to try again, but in 1950 Sarbacher lost by eleven points.

After his term in Congress, he became director of highway safety for the Commonwealth of Pennsylvania.

He was president and chairman of board of directors of the National Scientific Laboratories, Inc. in Washington, D.C., and NSL Electronics, Ltd. in Hamilton, Ontario, Canada.

At the time of his death, he was serving as chairman of the Postal Service management advisory team.

U.S. House of Representatives
| Preceded by William J. Green Jr. | Member of the U.S. House of Representatives from Pennsylvania's 5th congressional district 1947–1949 | Succeeded by William J. Green Jr. |
