= Fred C. Gartner =

American politician (1896–1972)

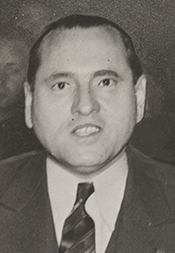

Member of the U.S. House of Representatives from Pennsylvania's 5th district
- In office January 3, 1939 – January 3, 1941
- Preceded by: Frank Joseph Gerard Dorsey
- Succeeded by: Francis R. Smith

Member of the Pennsylvania House of Representatives
- In office 1933-1934

Personal details
- Born: March 14, 1896 Philadelphia, Pennsylvania
- Died: September 1, 1972 (aged 76) Somers Point, New Jersey
- Party: Republican
- Education: Temple University School of Law

Fred Christian Gartner (March 14, 1896 – September 1, 1972) was a Republican member of the U.S. House of Representatives from Pennsylvania.

== Biography ==
Born in Philadelphia, Pennsylvania on March 14, 1896, Fred C. Gartner was a son of German immigrants. He attended the public schools and Brown Preparatory School in Philadelphia. He served as a yeoman in the United States Naval Reserve in 1918 and 1919. He graduated from the law department of Temple University in Philadelphia in 1920. He was a member of the Pennsylvania State Civil Service Commission at Philadelphia from 1928 to 1932. He served in the Pennsylvania State House of Representatives in 1933 and 1934.

Gartner was a Nazi sympathizer who met with the German American Bund in Washington in February 1939.

Gartner was elected as a Republican to the 76th Congress. He was an unsuccessful candidate for reelection in 1940. He served chairman of the board for the Hol-Gar Manufacturing Corporation of Pennsylvania.

U.S. House of Representatives
Preceded by Frank J. G. Dorsey	Member of the U.S. House of Representatives from Pennsylvania's 5th congressional district 1939–1941	Succeeded by Francis R. Smith
