= John McNair (American politician) =

American politician

John Alexander McNair (June 8, 1800 – August 12, 1861) was an American teacher and congressman representing Pennsylvania's fifth district for two terms from 1851 to 1855.

== Biography ==
Born in Bucks County, Pennsylvania, he taught school and worked as principal of Loller Academy in Hatboro, Pennsylvania in 1825.

=== Early career ===
He established a boys school in the village of Abington, Pennsylvania. He served as clerk of the courts of Montgomery County, Pennsylvania from 1845 to 1848 and moved to Norristown, Pennsylvania.

=== Congress ===
McNair was elected as a Democrat to the Thirty-second and Thirty-third Congresses. He served as chairman of the United States House Committee on Manufactures during the Thirty-third Congress.

=== Retirement and death ===
McNair settled on a plantation in Prince William County, Virginia, near Gainesville.

He died at Evansport, Virginia, near Aquia Creek, in 1861.

== Sources ==
- United States Congress. "John McNair (id: M000581)". Biographical Directory of the United States Congress.

U.S. House of Representatives
Preceded by John Freedley	Member of the U.S. House of Representatives from Pennsylvania's 5th congressional district March 4, 1851 – March 3, 1855	Succeeded by John Cadwalader
