= Andrew Boden (politician) =

American politician

Member of the U.S. House of Representatives from Pennsylvania's 5th district
- In office March 4, 1817 – March 3, 1821 Serving with William Maclay (1817–1819), David Fullerton (1819–1820), Thomas G. McCullough (1820–1821)
- Preceded by: William Maclay
- Succeeded by: James Duncan; James McSherry

Personal details
- Born: Carlisle, Pennsylvania, U.S.
- Died: December 20, 1835 Carlisle, Pennsylvania, U.S.
- Party: Democratic-Republican
- Occupation: Politician, lawyer

Andrew Boden was an American politician and lawyer who served in the United States House of Representatives from 1817 to 1821, representing the 5th congressional district of Pennsylvania as a member of the Democratic-Republican Party.

== Early life and education ==
Boden was born in Carlisle, Pennsylvania, where he attended public schools. He also studied law.

== Career ==
Boden was admitted to the bar; in addition to practicing law, he also engaged in the real estate business.

Boden served in the United States House of Representatives from 1817 to 1821, representing the 5th congressional district of Pennsylvania as a member of the Democratic-Republican Party.

Boden served in both the 15th United States Congress and the 16th United States Congress. His time in office began on March 4, 1817, and concluded on March 3, 1821.

Following his tenure in Congress, Boden resumed practicing law.

== Death ==
Boden died in Carlisle, Pennsylvania, on December 20, 1835.

U.S. House of Representatives
Preceded by William Maclay	Member of the U.S. House of Representatives from Pennsylvania's 5th congressional district 1817–1821; Served alongside: William Maclay (1817–1819), David Fullerton (1819–1820), Thomas G. McCullough (1820–1821)	Succeeded by James Duncan; James McSherry
