= Robert Whitehill (politician) =

American politician

Robert Whitehill (July 21, 1738 – April 8, 1813) was an American politician who was elected to five terms as a member of the U.S. House of Representatives from Pennsylvania, serving from 1805 until his death in 1813.

== Biography ==
Robert Whitehill (brother of John Whitehill, uncle of James Whitehill, and great-great-grandfather of John Crain Kunkel) was born in Pequea, Pennsylvania. He settled in Cumberland County, Pennsylvania.

=== State legislature ===
He was a member of the Pennsylvania State Constitutional Convention in July 1776 that approved the Declaration of Independence. He was a member of the council of safety in 1777, and a delegate to the State constitutional convention in 1790. He served as a member of the Pennsylvania House of Representatives from 1797 to 1800.

He served in the Pennsylvania State Senate from 1801 to 1804 and was speaker of the Senate in 1804 during the impeachment trials of the judges of the Supreme Court of Pennsylvania.

=== Congress ===
Whitehill was elected to the Ninth Congress to fill the vacancy caused by the death of John A. Hanna. He was reelected to the Tenth and to the three succeeding Congresses and served until his death.

=== Death and burial ===
He died in 1813 at Lauther Manor, Cumberland County, Pennsylvania. He was interred in Silver Spring Presbyterian Church Cemetery in Hampden Township, near Camp Hill, Pennsylvania.

== Writings ==
Notable writings include the Pennsylvania Constitution of 1776, which he helped draft, and the Minority Dissent to the ratification of the US Constitution by Pennsylvania. This dissent included a number of proposed amendments to the US Constitution and is thought to have been used by James Madison when he drafted the United States Bill of Rights.

== See also ==
- List of members of the United States Congress who died in office (1790–1899)

== Sources ==
- United States Congress. "Robert Whitehill (id: W000404)". Biographical Directory of the United States Congress.
- The Political Graveyard
- Crist, Robert Grant. Robert Whitehill and the Struggle for Civil Rights: A Paper Presented Before the Hamilton Library and Historical Association of Cumberland County, Carlisle, Pennsylvania., on March 20, 1958. Lemoyne, Pennsylvania.: Lemoyne Trust Co., 1958.
- Crist, Robert G. ed., Pennsylvania and the Bill of Rights (University Park:Pennsylvania Historical Association, 1990).
- Pittman, R. Carter, "Jasper Yeates’s Notes on the Pennsylvania Ratifying Convention, 1787," William and Mary Quarterly, 3rd Ser. (22, 2 April 1965): 301–318.
- Explore PA History

Political offices
| Preceded by James McLene | Member, Supreme Executive Council of Pennsylvania, representing Cumberland County; December 28, 1779 – November 20, 1781 | Succeeded by John Buyers |
U.S. House of Representatives
| Preceded by John Andre Hanna and David Bard | Member of the U.S. House of Representatives from Pennsylvania's 4th congressional district 1805–1813 alongside David Bard | Succeeded by Hugh Glasgow |
| Preceded by George Smith | Member of the U.S. House of Representatives from Pennsylvania's 5th congressional district 1813 alongside William Crawford | Succeeded by William Crawford and John Rea |
