= John Rea (politician) =

American politician (1755–1829)

Member of the U.S. House of Representatives from Pennsylvania's 5th district
- In office May 11, 1813 – March 4, 1815
- Preceded by: Robert Whitehill
- Succeeded by: William Maclay

Member of the U.S. House of Representatives from Pennsylvania's 7th district
- In office March 4, 1803 – March 4, 1811
- Preceded by: Thomas Boude
- Succeeded by: William Piper

Member of the Pennsylvania State Senate
- In office 1823-1824

Member of the Pennsylvania House of Representatives
- In office 1785-1786; 1789-1790; 1792-1793; 1801-1802

Personal details
- Born: January 27, 1755 Chambersburg, Pennsylvania
- Died: January 29, 1829 (aged 73) Chambersburg, Pennsylvania
- Resting place: Rocky Spring Churchyard near Chambersburg

John Rea (January 27, 1755 – February 26, 1829) was an early 19th-century American politician. He served in the U.S. Congress, both chambers of the Pennsylvania General Assembly, and in both the Revolutionary War and the War of 1812.

== Biography ==
Rea was born at "Rea’s Mansion," near Chambersburg, Pennsylvania.

=== Revolutionary War ===
Rea served as lieutenant and captain with the Cumberland County Militia during the Revolutionary War.

=== Early political career ===
On October 20, 1784, Rea was commissioned the first coroner of Franklin County, Pennsylvania.

Soon after, he was elected to Pennsylvania House of Representatives in 1785, 1786, 1789, 1790, 1792, 1793, 1801, and 1802. Also, Rea was the county auditor in 1793 and 1794.

=== Congress ===
He was elected as a Republican for the state of Pennsylvania to the Eight Congress and also served in the three succeeding Congresses (March 4, 1803 – March 3, 1810).

=== War of 1812 ===
He then served in the War of 1812 as major general of the Eleventh Division of Militia.

=== Return to Congress ===
Following the death of Robert Whitehill, Rea was elected to the Thirteenth Congress, and served from May 11, 1813 until March 3, 1815.

=== State Senate ===
He then became a member of the Pennsylvania State Senate, serving in 1823 and 1824, when he resigned.

== Death and burial ==
Rea died in Chambersburg, Pennsylvania, on February 26, 1829. He is currently buried at Rocky Spring Churchyard, near Chambersburg, Pennsylvania.

U.S. House of Representatives
Preceded by Thomas Boude	Member of the U.S. House of Representatives from Pennsylvania's 7th congressional district 1803–1811	Succeeded by William Piper
Preceded by Robert Whitehill	Member of the U.S. House of Representatives from Pennsylvania's 5th congressional district 1813–1815 alongside: William Crawford	Succeeded by William Maclay
