= Interstate Insurance Product Regulation Commission =

American standards organization

The Interstate Insurance Product Regulation Commission is an organization that promotes standards for life insurance products in the United States. It approves or disapproves individual and group products such as annuity, life insurance, disability income, and long-term care policies. States must agree to the compact by legislation, and its rules are subject to judicial review.

== History ==
The commission was created in 2002 by members of the National Association of Insurance Commissioners. Its mission statement is to "serve[] insurance regulators, consumers and providers by improving the efficiency and effectiveness in the ever-changing insurance marketplace." It serves as a clearinghouse for insurance companies' policy form filings.

Following its creation, 45 states joined the compact, the last being Delaware in 2021. South Carolina withdrew in 2022 following a dispute with the commission over its authority to approve long-term care rate increases.

The commission's authority was called into question in 2020 following the decision of ''Amica Life Insurance Company v Wertz'', in which the Colorado Supreme Court ruled that a standard 2-year suicide exclusion for life insurance contracts conflicted with state law and was an unauthorized delegation of authority to the commission.
