= Jacob Senewell Yost =

American politician (1801–1872)

Member of the U.S. House of Representatives from Pennsylvania's 5th district
- In office March 4, 1843 – March 3, 1847
- Preceded by: Joseph Fornance
- Succeeded by: John Freedley

Member of the Pennsylvania House of Representatives
- In office 1836–1839

Personal details
- Born: July 29, 1801 Lower Pottsgrove Township, Montgomery County, Pennsylvania, U.S.
- Died: March 7, 1872 (aged 70) Pottstown, Pennsylvania, U.S.
- Party: Democratic
- Children: 4

Jacob Senewell Yost (July 29, 1801 – March 7, 1872) was an American politician who represented Pennsylvania in the United States House of Representatives.

== Early life and education ==
Yost was born in Lower Pottsgrove Township, Montgomery County, Pennsylvania. He attended the common schools and Fourth Street Academy in Philadelphia.

== Career ==
He engaged in agricultural pursuits and served as publisher and editor of the La Fayette Aurora in La Fayette, Pennsylvania.

He was a member of the Pennsylvania House of Representatives from 1836 to 1839. Yost was elected as a Democrat to the Twenty-Eighth and Twenty-Ninth Congresses, serving from 1843 to 1847. He resumed a political position as the U.S. marshal for the Eastern District of Pennsylvania by appointment of President James Buchanan, serving from 1857 until his resignation in 1860.

== Personal life ==
Yost continued agricultural pursuits until his death in Pottstown, Pennsylvania, at the age of 70. He was interred in Edgewood Cemetery in Pottstown, Pennsylvania.
