= Pennsylvania Insurance Department =

Agency overview
- Formed: April 4, 1873; 153 years ago
- Jurisdiction: Commonwealth of Pennsylvania
- Headquarters: Harrisburg, Pennsylvania
- Employees: 200
- Agency executive: Michael Humphreys, Acting Commissioner
- Website: www.insurance.pa.gov

The Pennsylvania Insurance Department is a cabinet-level agency in Pennsylvania, United States. It was founded in 1873 and has several main functions, including:

- To audit insurance companies' finances
- Issue licenses to insurance industry individuals and companies
- Regulate insurance policies and rates

== See also ==
- List of Pennsylvania state agencies
